= Kornél Bardóczky =

Hungarian tennis player

- Country (sports): Hungary
- Residence: Kecskemét, Hungary
- Born: 5 July 1978 (age 46); Kecskemét, Hungary
- Height: 1.88 m (6 ft 2 in)
- Turned pro: 1994
- Retired: 2012
- Plays: Right-handed
- Prize money: US$104,149

Singles
- Career record: 10–11
- Highest ranking: No. 254 (5 July 2004)

Doubles
- Career record: 10–7
- Highest ranking: No. 130 (3 May 2004)

Kornél Bardóczky (born 5 July 1978) is a retired professional male tennis player from Hungary.

Bardóczky reached his highest individual ranking on the ATP Tour on 5 July 2004, when he became World number 254. He primarily plays on the Futures circuit and the Challenger tour.

Bardóczky is a member of the Hungarian Davis Cup team, having posted a 17–13 record in singles and a 12–7 record in doubles in twenty-eight ties played between 1997 and 2012. He has also won the Hungarian National Tennis Championships three times – 2001, 2002, and 2006.

== Satellite, Future and Challenger finals ==
=== Singles: 27 (18–9) ===
Legend (singles) ATP Challenger Tour (0–0) ITF Futures Tour (13–7) ITF Satellites (5–2)	Titles by surface Hard (1–0) Clay (17–7) Grass (0–0) Carpet (0–2)

Result	W–L	Date	Tournament	Tier	Surface	Opponent	Score
Win	1–0	Aug 1997	Budapest, Hungary	Satellite	Clay	(Argentina) Mariano Delfino	6–3, 6–7, 7–5
Win	2–0	Aug 1997	Belgrade, Yugoslavia	Satellite	Clay	(Hungary) Gergely Kisgyörgy	6–4, 7–6
Loss	2–1	Feb 1998	Austria F1, Bergheim	Futures	Carpet (i)	(Slovenia) Borut Urh	3–6, 1–6
Loss	2–2	Jun 1998	Hungary F1, Budapest	Futures	Clay	(Austria) Rainer Falenti	4–6, 6–4, 4–6
Win	3–2	Jun 1998	Hungary F2, Budapest	Futures	Clay	(Austria) Ingo Neumüller	7–5, 4–6, 6–4
Loss	3–3	Aug 1999	Budapest, Hungary	Satellite	Clay	(Argentina) Cristian Kordasz	2–6, 1–6
Win	4–3	Jul 2000	Hungary F3, Budapest	Futures	Clay	(Slovakia) Juraj Hasko	6–3, 0–6, 6–2
Win	5–3	Aug 2001	Niš, Yugoslavia	Satellite	Clay	(Czech Republic) Jan Minář	6–4, 3–6, 6–1
Win	6–3	Apr 2002	Kuwait F1, Mishref	Futures	Hard	(Netherlands) Jasper Smit	6–0, 6–3
Win	7–3	Sep 2002	Bari, Italy	Satellite	Clay	(Italy) Andreas Seppi	6–2, 6–4
Loss	7–4	Sep 2003	Hungary F3, Kaposvár	Futures	Clay	(Spain) Gabriel Trujillo Soler	3–6, 1–6
Loss	7–5	Sep 2003	Hungary F3, Sopron	Futures	Clay	(Austria) Marko Neunteibl	6–7^{(5–7)}, 3–6
Loss	7–6	Oct 2003	Croatia F9, Veli Lošinj	Futures	Clay	(United Kingdom) Alan Mackin	3–6, 5–7
Loss	7–7	Mar 2004	Ičići, Croatia	Satellite	Clay	(Austria) Marco Mirnegg	0–6, 1–6
Win	8–7	Mar 2004	Ičići, Croatia	Satellite	Clay	(Croatia) Saša Tuksar	4–6, 7–5, 7–5
Win	9–7	May 2004	Hungary F2, Hódmezővásárhely	Futures	Clay	(Netherlands) Melle van Gemerden	7–5, 6–3
Win	10–7	Jun 2004	Germany F8, Leun	Futures	Clay	(Germany) Tobias Kamke	6–2, 6–3
Win	11–7	Jul 2005	Romania F9, Hunedoara	Futures	Clay	(Romania) Victor-Mugurel Anagnastopol	6–3, 5–7, 6–4
Win	12–7	Aug 2005	Hungary F4, Kaposvár	Futures	Clay	(Czech Republic) Jaroslav Pospíšil	7–5, 6–3
Win	13–7	Sep 2005	Hungary F5, Szolnok	Futures	Clay	(Czech Republic) Lukáš Rosol	6–2, 6–1
Win	14–7	Sep 2005	Hungary F6, Budapest	Futures	Clay	(Hungary) Sebő Kiss	4–6, 6–2, 7–5
Win	15–7	Jul 2006	Romania F13, Hunedoara	Futures	Clay	(Croatia) Vjekoslav Skenderović	6–4, 6–4
Loss	15–8	Mar 2007	Croatia F4, Vrsar	Futures	Clay	(Republic of Ireland) Conor Niland	4–6, 4–6
Win	16–8	Jun 2007	Germany F6, Marburg	Futures	Clay	(Germany) Peter Gojowczyk	7–6^{(7–1)}, 2–6, 7–5
Win	17–8	Aug 2007	Germany F12, Essen	Futures	Clay	(Germany) Alexander Flock	6–4, 6–3
Win	18–8	Aug 2008	Germany F13, Wetzlar	Futures	Clay	(Germany) Marius Zay	6–1, 6–3
Loss	18–9	Oct 2010	Greece F2, Paros	Futures	Carpet	(Hungary) Ádám Kellner	2–3 ret.

=== Doubles 52 (32–20) ===
Legend (doubles) ATP Challenger Tour (6–4) ITF Futures Tour (18–11) ITF Satellites (8–5)	Titles by surface Hard (1–1) Clay (30–19) Grass (0–0) Carpet (1–0)

Result	W–L	Date	Tournament	Tier	Surface	Partner	Opponents	Score
Win	1–0	Sep 1997	Budva, Yugoslavia	Satellite	Clay	(Hungary) Miklós Jancsó	(Austria) Matey Pampulov (Bulgaria) Milen Velev	6–2, 7–6
Loss	1–1	Sep 1997	Budapest, Hungary	Challenger	Clay	(Hungary) Miklós Jancsó	(Serbia and Montenegro) Nebojša Đorđević (Serbia and Montenegro) Dušan Vemić	1–6, 6–3, 4–6
Loss	1–2	May 1998	Germany F5, Schwäbisch Hall	Futures	Clay	(Hungary) Tamás György	(Germany) Markus Menzler (Germany) Markus Wislsperger	4–6, 6–3, 6–7
Win	2–2	Jun 1998	Hungary F1, Budapest	Futures	Clay	(Hungary) Miklós Jancsó	(France) Antony La Porte (France) Cyril Saulnier	6–4, 5–7, 6–4
Loss	2–3	Jun 1998	Hungary F2, Budapest	Futures	Clay	(Hungary) Miklós Jancsó	(Hungary) László Fonó (Hungary) Krisztián Keresztes	1–6, 6–7
Loss	2–4	Jul 1998	Budapest, Hungary	Satellite	Clay	(Hungary) Zoltán Nagy	(Czech Republic) František Čermák (Czech Republic) Petr Dezort	6–2, 7–6
Win	3–4	Dec 1998	Sharm El Sheikh, Egypt	Satellite	Clay	(Hungary) Zoltán Nagy	(Netherlands) Melvyn op der Heijde (Netherlands) Melle van Gemerden	6–1, 4–6, 6–3
Loss	3–5	Apr 1999	Tučepi, Croatia	Satellite	Clay	(Hungary) Péter Madarassy	(Croatia) Ivo Karlović (Croatia) Goran Orešić	2–6, 2–6
Loss	3–6	Aug 1999	Budapest, Hungary	Satellite	Clay	(Hungary) Zoltán Böröczky	(Hungary) Tamás György (Hungary) Viktor Kóczán	6–2, 5–7, 6–7
Loss	3–7	Sep 1999	Ukraine F5, Horlivka	Futures	Clay	(Russia) Yuri Schukin	(Republic of Ireland) Scott Barron (Germany) Andreas Tattermusch	3–6, 6–7
Win	4–7	May 2000	Split, Croatia	Satellite	Clay	(Hungary) László Fonó	(Hungary) Zoltán Böröczky (Hungary) Tamás György	6–4, 6–2
Loss	4–8	Mar 2001	Poreč, Croatia	Satellite	Clay	(Romania) Ionuț Moldovan	(Slovakia) Branislav Sekáč (Czech Republic) Pavel Šnobel	4–6, 6–3, 3–6
Win	5–8	Jun 2001	Hungary F1, Sopron	Futures	Clay	(Hungary) Zoltán Nagy	(Slovakia) Michal Mertiňák (Slovakia) Branislav Sekáč	7–6^{(7–3)}, 6–3
Win	6–8	Jul 2001	Hungary F2, Pécs	Futures	Clay	(Hungary) Zoltán Nagy	(Argentina) Jose Maria Arnedo (Germany) Frank Moser	6–2, 7–5
Win	7–8	Jul 2001	Hungary F3, Budapest	Futures	Clay	(Hungary) Zoltán Nagy	(Chile) Sergio Elias Musalem (Germany) Frank Moser	6–2, 7–5
Win	8–8	Aug 2001	Novi Sad, Yugoslavia	Satellite	Clay	(Hungary) Zoltán Nagy	(Serbia and Montenegro) Darko Mađarovski (Serbia and Montenegro) Aleksander Slović	5–7, 6–1, 6–4
Win	9–8	Sep 2001	Belgrade, Yugoslavia	Satellite	Clay	(Hungary) Zoltán Nagy	(Italy) Nicolo Cotto (Italy) Marco Pedrini	6–4, 6–0
Loss	9–9	Sep 2002	Aschaffenburg, Germany	Challenger	Clay	(Hungary) Zoltán Nagy	(Argentina) Diego del Río (Argentina) Andrés Schneiter	3–6, 6–3, 3–6
Loss	9–10	Oct 2002	Galatina, Italy	Satellite	Clay	(Germany) Ivo Klec	(Italy) Andreas Seppi (Italy) Simone Vagnozzi	6–4, 4–6, 6–7^{(5–7)}
Loss	9–11	Feb 2003	Portugal F2, Espinho	Futures	Clay	(Hungary) Gergely Kisgyörgy	(Slovakia) Michal Mertiňák (Austria) Marco Mirnegg	5–7, 6–4, 3–6
Loss	9–12	Feb 2003	Portugal F3, Espinho	Futures	Clay	(Hungary) Gergely Kisgyörgy	(Slovakia) Michal Mertiňák (Austria) Marco Mirnegg	4–6, 4–6
Win	10–12	May 2003	Hungary F1, Miskolc	Futures	Clay	(Hungary) Gergely Kisgyörgy	(Italy) Leonardo Azzaro (Poland) Łukasz Kubot	7–6^{(8–6)}, 6–3
Win	11–12	May 2003	Hungary F2, Hódmezővásárhely	Futures	Clay	(Hungary) Gergely Kisgyörgy	(Hungary) Sebő Kiss (Hungary) Zsolt Tatár	6–1, 7–6^{(7–4)}
Win	12–12	May 2003	Budapest, Hungary	Challenger	Clay	(Hungary) Gergely Kisgyörgy	(United States) Thomas Blake (United States) Jason Marshall	7–6^{(7–4)}, 6–0
Win	13–12	Jun 2003	Serbia and Montenegro F3, Belgrade	Futures	Clay	(Czech Republic) Jaroslav Pospíšil	(United States) Mirko Pehar (Serbia and Montenegro) Aleksander Slović	6–0, 6–4
Win	14–12	Jul 2003	Oberstaufen, Germany	Challenger	Clay	(Hungary) Gergely Kisgyörgy	(Argentina) Ignacio González King (Brazil) Ricardo Schlachter	4–6, 7–6^{(7–4)}, 6–2
Win	15–12	Aug 2003	Saransk, Russia	Challenger	Clay	(Czech Republic) Martin Štěpánek	(Poland) Łukasz Kubot (Ukraine) Orest Tereshchuk	7–6^{(7–3)}, 6–3
Loss	15–13	Sep 2003	Budapest, Hungary	Challenger	Clay	(Hungary) Gergely Kisgyörgy	(Argentina) Ignacio González King (Argentina) Juan Pablo Guzmán	5–7, 6–4, 3–6
Loss	15–14	Oct 2003	Croatia F9, Veli Lošinj	Futures	Clay	(Slovenia) Marko Tkalec	(Austria) Philipp Müllner (Austria) Herbert Wiltschnig	5–7, 0–1 ret.
Win	16–14	Mar 2004	Ičići, Croatia	Satellite	Clay	(Austria) Marco Mirnegg	(Serbia and Montenegro) Nikola Ćirić (Serbia and Montenegro) David Savić	6–3, 7–5
Win	17–14	Mar 2004	Ičići, Croatia	Satellite	Clay	(Austria) Marco Mirnegg	(Croatia) Albert Lončarić (Croatia) Robert Lončarić	3–6, 6–3, 6–4
Win	18–14	Mar 2004	Ičići, Croatia	Satellite	Clay	(Austria) Marco Mirnegg	(Czech Republic) Ladislav Chramosta (Czech Republic) David Miketa	1–0 ret.
Win	19–14	May 2004	Rome, Italy	Challenger	Clay	(Hungary) Gergely Kisgyörgy	(Italy) Daniele Giorgini (Italy) Manuel Jorquera	7–6^{(7–4)}, 4–6, 6–4
Win	20–14	May 2004	Hungary F2, Hódmezővásárhely	Futures	Clay	(Romania) Gabriel Moraru	(Hungary) Zsolt Tatár (Netherlands) Melle van Gemerden	7–5, 6–7^{(3–7)}, 6–3
Win	21–14	May 2004	Budapest, Hungary	Challenger	Clay	(Hungary) Gergely Kisgyörgy	(Italy) Daniele Bracciali (Italy) Manuel Jorquera	6–4, 6–2
Loss	21–15	Jun 2004	Germany F8, Leun	Futures	Clay	(Czech Republic) Jan Mertl	(Austria) Martin Slanar (Czech Republic) Pavel Šnobel	6–4, 4–6, 1–6
Win	22–15	Aug 2004	Cordenons, Italy	Challenger	Clay	(Italy) Leonardo Azzaro	(Italy) Andrea Merati (Belgium) Christophe Rochus	6–2, 6–0
Loss	22–16	Sep 2004	Aschaffenburg, Germany	Challenger	Clay	(Hungary) Gergely Kisgyörgy	(Czech Republic) Ota Fukárek (Czech Republic) Jan Vacek	6–3, 4–6, 3–6
Win	23–16	Sep 2005	Hungary F5, Szolnok	Futures	Clay	(Hungary) Gergely Kisgyörgy	(Italy) Alessandro da Col (Czech Republic) Lukáš Rosol	6–2, 6–1
Loss	23–17	Sep 2005	Hungary F6, Budapest	Futures	Clay	(Hungary) Gergely Kisgyörgy	(Serbia and Montenegro) Aleksander Slović (Serbia and Montenegro) Viktor Troicki	6–4, 6–7^{(0–7)}, 3–6
Win	24–17	Nov 2006	Brazil F17, São Paulo	Futures	Clay	(Hungary) György Balázs	(Brazil) André Miele (Brazil) João Souza	6–2, 6–4
Win	25–17	Nov 2006	Brazil F18, São Paulo	Futures	Clay	(Hungary) Attila Balázs	(Italy) Marco Gualdi (Italy) Mattia Livraghi	4–6, 6–3, 7–6^{(10–8)}
Win	26–17	Jun 2007	Germany F6, Marburg	Futures	Clay	(Hungary) Dénes Lukács	(Canada) Érik Chvojka (Germany) Philipp Piyamongkol	7–5, 5–7, 6–4
Win	27–17	Sep 2007	Germany F16, Friedberg	Futures	Clay	(Hungary) Sebő Kiss	(Netherlands) Daniel Lagendaal (Netherlands) Michel Meijer	6–4, 7–6^{(7–4)}
Win	28–17	Dec 2007	Dominican Republic F3, Santo Domingo	Futures	Hard	(Hungary) Ádám Kellner	(France) Philippe De Bonnevie (Brazil) Rodrigo-Antonio Grilli	6–0, 6–3
Win	29–17	May 2008	Czech Republic F4, Karlovy Vary	Futures	Clay	(Czech Republic) Martin Vacek	(Slovakia) Andrej Martin (Slovakia) Miloslav Mečíř	w/o
Loss	29–18	Mar 2009	Croatia F3, Poreč	Futures	Clay	(Hungary) György Balázs	(Croatia) Marin Bradarić (Croatia) Ante Nakic-Alfirevic	5–7, 5–7
Loss	29–19	May 2009	Bosnia and Herzegovina F1, Doboj	Futures	Clay	(Hungary) Krisztián Krocskó	(Germany) Dennis Bloemke (Australia) Jarryd Maher	4–6, 4–6
Loss	29–20	Oct 2009	Thailand F4, Bangkok	Futures	Hard	(Hungary) Ádám Kellner	(Czech Republic) Roman Jebavý (New Zealand) Rubin Statham	4–6, 4–6
Win	30–20	Oct 2010	Greece F2, Paros	Futures	Carpet	(Hungary) Ádám Kellner	(Greece) Konstantinos Economidis (Greece) Alexandros Jakupovic	6–2, 6–4
Win	31–20	Jul 2011	Austria F3, Fieberbrunn	Futures	Clay	(Croatia) Mislav Hižak	(Italy) Riccardo Bellotti (Austria) Gerald Melzer	7–6^{(7–2)}, 6–4
Win	32–20	Mar 2012	Croatia F4, Poreč	Futures	Clay	(Hungary) Attila Balázs	(Germany) Steven Moneke (Germany) Marc Sieber	2–6, 6–1, [10–8]

== Davis Cup ==
=== Participations: (29–20) ===
Group membership World Group (0–0) WG play-off (0–0) Group I (1–1) Group II (24–19) Group III (4–0) Group IV (0–0)	Matches by surface Hard (7–8) Clay (19–11) Grass (0–0) Carpet (3–1)	Matches by type Singles (17–13) Doubles (12–7)

- ▲ ▼ indicates the outcome of the Davis Cup match followed by the score, date, place of event, the zonal classification and its phase, and the court surface.

Rubber outcome	No.	Rubber	Match type (partner if any)	Opponent nation	Opponent player(s)	Score
▼2–3; 19–21 September 1997; Római Tennis Academy, Budapest, Hungary; Europe/Africa Zone Group I relegation play-off; clay surface
Defeat	1	I	Singles	Ukraine	Andrei Medvedev	2–6, 2–6, 2–6
Victory	2	V	Singles (dead rubber)	Ukraine	Andrei Rybalko	6–0, 6–4
▲4–1; 1–3 May 1998; Római Tennis Academy, Budapest, Hungary; Europe/Africa Zone Group II first round; clay surface
Victory	3	III	Doubles (with Attila Sávolt)	(Republic of Ireland) Ireland	Owen Casey / Tom Hamilton	6–3, 6–4, 1–6, 6–1
▲3–2; 17–19 July 1998; Római Tennis Academy, Budapest, Hungary; Europe/Africa Zone Group II second round; clay surface
Victory	4	II	Singles	Slovenia	Iztok Božič	6–0, 6–3, 1–6, 6–4
Defeat	5	V	Singles (dead rubber)	Slovenia	Andrej Kračman	6–4, 5–7, 3–6
▲5–0; 30 April – 2 May 1999; Római Tennis Academy, Budapest, Hungary; Europe/Africa Zone Group II first round; clay surface
Victory	6	V	Singles (dead rubber)	Greece	Pantelis Moschoutis	6–4, 7–6^{(7–2)}
▼2–3; 20–22 July 2001; Skagen Tennis Center, Skagen, Denmark; Europe/Africa Zone Group II second round; hard surface
Defeat	7	II	Singles	Denmark	Kristian Pless	3–6, 1–6, 7–6^{(7–2)}, 3–6
Defeat	8	V	Singles (dead rubber)	Denmark	Jonathan Printzlau	7–6^{(7–2)}, 6–7^{(3–7)}, 6–7^{(7–9)}, 1–6
▼1–4; 3–5 May 2002; National Tennis Centre, Esch-sur-Alzette, Luxembourg; Europe/Africa Zone Group II first round; hard (i) surface
Defeat	9	I	Singles	Luxembourg	Mike Scheidweiler	7–6^{(7–2)}, 2–6, 2–6, 5–7
▲3–0; 3 February 2003; Sidi Fredj Tennis Center, Sidi Fredj, Algeria; Europe/Africa Zone Group III Pool A round robin; clay surface
Victory	10	II	Singles	Estonia	Mait Künnap	6–3, 6–1
▲3–0; 4 February 2003; Sidi Fredj Tennis Center, Sidi Fredj, Algeria; Europe/Africa Zone Group III Pool A round robin; clay surface
Victory	11	II	Singles	Madagascar	Donne-Dubert Radison	6–0, 7–5
▲3–0; 5 February 2003; Sidi Fredj Tennis Center, Sidi Fredj, Algeria; Europe/Africa Zone Group III Pool A round robin; clay surface
Victory	12	II	Singles	Namibia	Jean-Pierre Huish	6–1, 6–1
▲3–0; 6 February 2003; Sidi Fredj Tennis Center, Sidi Fredj, Algeria; Europe/Africa Zone Group III promotional play-off; clay surface
Victory	13	II	Singles	Lithuania	Rolandas Muraška	6–2, 6–3
▲4–1; 9–11 April 2004; Fitzwilliam Lawn Tennis Club, Dublin, Ireland; Europe/Africa Zone Group II first round; carpet (i) surface
Victory	14	II	Singles	(Republic of Ireland) Ireland	Kevin Sorensen	3–6, 5–7, 6–4, 7–6^{(7–5)}, 6–3
Victory	15	III	Doubles (with Gergely Kisgyörgy)	(Republic of Ireland) Ireland	Eoin Collins / David J. Mullins	4–6, 6–1, 7–5, 1–6, 6–4
▲3–2; 16–18 July 2004; Gellért Leisure Centre, Szeged, Hungary; Europe/Africa Zone Group II second round; clay surface
Victory	16	I	Singles	Norway	Helge Koll-Frafjord	6–2, 6–1, 6–1
Victory	17	III	Doubles (with Gergely Kisgyörgy)	Norway	Jan Frode Andersen / Frederick Sundsten	6–3, 6–4, 6–3
Defeat	18	IV	Singles	Norway	Jan Frode Andersen	3–6, 4–6, 7–6^{(10–8)}, 6–4, 3–6
▼0–3; 24–26 September 2004; Gellért Leisure Centre, Szeged, Hungary; Europe/Africa Zone Group II promotional play-off; clay surface
Defeat	19	I	Singles	Serbia and Montenegro	Boris Pašanski	7–6^{(7–5)}, 4–6, 4–6, 2–6
Defeat	20	III	Doubles (with Gergely Kisgyörgy)	Serbia and Montenegro	Dušan Vemić / Nenad Zimonjić	3–6, 2–6, 2–6
▼2–3; 15–17 July 2005; Viccourt Tennis Club, Donetsk, Ukraine; Europe/Africa Zone Group II second round; hard surface
Defeat	21	II	Singles	Ukraine	Orest Tereshchuk	4–6, 2–6, 6–3, 6–2, 3–6
Defeat	22	III	Doubles (with Gergely Kisgyörgy)	Ukraine	Mikhail Filima / Orest Tereshchuk	7–6^{(7–3)}, 6–7^{(2–7)}, 4–6, 4–6
Victory	23	IV	Singles (dead rubber)	Ukraine	Mikhail Filima	3–6, 7–6^{(8–6)}, 7–6^{(7–5)}
▲5–0; 7–9 April 2006; Hódmezővásárhelyi Tennis Club, Hódmezővásárhely, Hungary; Europe/Africa Zone Group II first round; hard (i) surface
Victory	24	II	Singles	Egypt	Sherif Sabry	7–6^{(7–4)}, 6–1, 6–3
Victory	25	III	Doubles (with Gergely Kisgyörgy)	Egypt	Karim Maamoun / Mohamed Mamoun	6–4, 7–6^{(7–5)}, 6–4
Victory	26	IV	Singles (dead rubber)	Egypt	Mohamed Mamoun	7–5, 6–3
▲3–2; 21–23 July 2006; Lokomotiv Plovdiv Tennis Club, Plovdiv, Bulgaria; Europe/Africa Zone Group II second round; clay surface
Victory	27	I	Singles	Bulgaria	Ilia Kushev	7–5, 6–3, 6–0
Victory	28	III	Doubles (with Gergely Kisgyörgy)	Bulgaria	Yordan Kanev / Ivaylo Traykov	4–6, 6–4, 6–4, 6–7^{(3–7)}, 11–9
▼2–3; 22–24 September 2006; Római Tennis Academy, Budapest, Hungary; Europe/Africa Zone Group II promotional play-off; clay surface
Victory	29	II	Singles	(Georgia (country)) Georgia	Lado Chikhladze	6–4, 6–7^{(4–7)}, 6–1, 6–2
Defeat	30	III	Doubles (with Gergely Kisgyörgy)	(Georgia (country)) Georgia	Lado Chikhladze / Irakli Labadze	6–4, 0–6, 3–6, 2–6
Defeat	31	IV	Singles	(Georgia (country)) Georgia	Irakli Labadze	6–7^{(4–7)}, 1–6, 7–6^{(7–2)}, 6–1, 4–6
▲4–1; 6–8 April 2007; Oslo Tennis Arena, Oslo, Norway; Europe/Africa Zone Group II first round; hard (i) surface
Victory	32	I	Singles	Norway	Frederik Sletting-Johnsen	4–6, 7–6^{(7–5)}, 6–2, 7–5
Victory	33	III	Doubles (with Gergely Kisgyörgy)	Norway	Stian Boretti / Frederik Sletting-Johnsen	4–6, 7–6^{(7–5)}, 7–6^{(7–4)}, 6–2
▼1–4; 20–22 July 2007; Római Tennis Academy, Budapest, Hungary; Europe/Africa Zone Group II second round; clay surface
Defeat	34	II	Singles	Monaco	Jean-René Lisnard	1–6, 6–3, 6–7^{(1–7)}, 4–6
Victory	35	III	Doubles (with Sebő Kiss)	Monaco	Guillaume Couillard / Jean-René Lisnard	6–1, 5–7, 4–6, 6–4, 6–2
Defeat	36	IV	Singles	Monaco	Benjamin Balleret	7–6^{(7–5)}, 7–5, 4–6, 0–6, 0–6
▼2–3; 11–13 April 2008; Olympique Mohamed Boudiaf Tennis Club, Algiers, Algeria; Europe/Africa Zone Group II first round; clay surface
Victory	37	I	Singles	Algeria	Slimane Saoudi	6–1, 6–4, 6–3
Victory	38	III	Doubles (with Róbert Varga)	Algeria	Lamine Ouahab / Slimane Saoudi	6–4, 6–3, 7–5
Defeat	39	IV	Singles	Algeria	Lamine Ouahab	1–6, 6–4, 6–3, 3–6, 2–6
▲5–0; 18–20 July 2008; Thessaloniki Tennis Club, Thessaloniki, Greece; Europe/Africa Zone Group II relegation play-off; clay surface
Victory	40	II	Singles	Greece	Charalampos Kapogiannis	6–2, 6–2, 6–4
Victory	41	III	Doubles (with Róbert Varga)	Greece	Charalampos Kapogiannis / Konstantinos Mikos	6–1, 6–1, 6–1
▼2–3; 6–8 March 2009; University Sports Hall, Győr, Hungary; Europe/Africa Zone Group II first round; carpet (i) surface
Victory	42	III	Doubles (with Róbert Varga)	Bulgaria	Grigor Dimitrov / Todor Enev	1–6, 6–2, 3–6, 6–2, 6–2
▼1–4; 5–7 March 2010; Coral Tennis Club, Tallinn, Estonia; Europe/Africa Zone Group II first round; hard (i) surface
Defeat	43	II	Singles	Estonia	Jürgen Zopp	6–7^{(7–9)}, 1–6, 0–6
Defeat	44	III	Doubles (with Márton Fucsovics)	Estonia	Mait Künnap / Jürgen Zopp	3–6, 6–2, 5–7, 7–5, 8–10
▲4–1; 9–11 July 2010; Gödöllő Kiskastély, Gödöllő, Hungary; Europe/Africa Zone Group II relegation play-off; clay surface
Victory	45	III	Doubles (with György Balázs)	(North Macedonia) Macedonia	Lazar Magdinčev / Predrag Rusevski	3–6, 6–2, 2–6, 6–0, 6–3
▲5–0; 4–6 March 2011; National Tennis Centre, Nicosia, Cyprus; Europe/Africa Zone Group II first round; hard surface
Victory	46	III	Doubles (with Attila Balázs)	Cyprus	Rareș Cuzdriorean / Christopher Koutrouzas	6–1, 6–4, 6–3
▲3–2; 8–10 July 2011; Gödöllő Kiskastély, Gödöllő, Hungary; Europe/Africa Zone Group II second round; clay surface
Defeat	47	III	Doubles (with Márton Fucsovics)	Belarus	Uladzimir Ignatik / Max Mirnyi	5–7, 7–6^{(7–4)}, 7–6^{(7–2)}, 1–6, 4–6
▼0–5; 16–18 September 2011; Braehead Arena, Glasgow, Great Britain; Europe/Africa Zone Group II promotional play-off; hard (i) surface
Defeat	48	III	Doubles (with Attila Balázs)	(United Kingdom) Great Britain	Colin Fleming / Ross Hutchins	3–6, 4–6, 4–6
▼2–3; 6–8 April 2012; Bujtosi Szabadidő Csarnok, Nyíregyháza, Hungary; Europe/Africa Zone Group II second round; carpet (i) surface
Defeat	49	III	Doubles (with Attila Balázs)	Latvia	Ernests Gulbis / Andis Juška	7–6^{(7–5)}, 3–6, 4–6, 2–6

== Record against other players ==
Bardóczky's match record against players who have been ranked in the top 100, with those who are active in boldface.
ATP Tour, Challenger and Future tournaments' main draw and qualifying matches are considered.

Opponent	Highest ranking	Matches	Won	Lost	Win %	Last match
(Serbia) **Novak Djokovic**	1	1	0	1	0%	Lost (4–6, 2–6) at 2004 Budapest 1R
(Ukraine) Andrei Medvedev	4	1	0	1	0%	Lost (2–6, 2–6, 2–6) at 1997 Davis Cup RPO
(Austria) Jürgen Melzer	8	1	0	1	0%	Lost (3–6, 2–6) at 1998 Austria F3 1R
(Italy) **Fabio Fognini**	9	1	0	1	0%	Lost (2-6, 1–6) at 2005 Budapest Q2
(Sweden) Joachim Johansson	9	1	0	1	0%	Lost (2-6, 6–7^{(4–7)}) at 2002 Freudenstadt Q1
(Latvia) **Ernests Gulbis**	10	1	0	1	0%	Lost (6-3, 1-6, 1-6) at 2005 Umag Q1
(Croatia) **Ivo Karlović**	14	1	0	1	0%	Lost (6–7^{(3–7)}, 2–6) at 2003 Hungary F2 2R
(Germany) **Philipp Kohlschreiber**	16	1	0	1	0%	Lost (1-6, 3–6) at 2003 Weiden 2R
(Italy) **Andreas Seppi**	18	2	2	0	100%	Won (6-2, 6–4) at 2002 Italy Satellite F
(Spain) **Marcel Granollers**	19	1	0	1	0%	Lost (4–6, 2–6) at 2007 Timișoara 2R
(France) **Adrian Mannarino**	22	1	1	0	100%	Won (6-3, 6-1) at 2006 France F5 2R
(Czech Republic) Bohdan Ulihrach	22	1	0	1	0%	Lost (6-4, 0–6, 6–7^{(6–8)}) at 2003 Aschaffenburg 2R
(Romania) Victor Hănescu	26	2	1	1	50%	Won (6-3, 6–1) at 2000 Croatia Satellite QF
(Czech Republic) **Lukáš Rosol**	26	3	3	0	100%	Won (6-3, 6–2) at 2006 Prostějov Q2
(Belgium) Kristof Vliegen	30	1	0	1	0%	Lost (3-6, 3–6) at 2003 Bratislava Q1
(Germany) Andreas Beck	33	1	1	0	100%	Won (6-4, 6–3) at 2003 Oberstaufen Q1
(Italy) **Paolo Lorenzi**	33	1	0	1	0%	Lost (3-6, 3–6) at 2002 Italy Satellite SF
(Russia) Igor Kunitsyn	35	1	0	1	0%	Lost (6-7, 4–6) at 1999 Croatia Masters QF
(Germany) Philipp Petzschner	35	1	0	1	0%	Lost (0-4 ret.) at 2005 Germany F3 2R
(France) **Édouard Roger-Vasselin**	35	1	0	1	0%	Lost (6–7^{(2–7)}, 6-3, 5–7) at 2003 Manerbio 2R
(France) Florent Serra	36	1	1	0	100%	Won (6-1, 6–4) at 2004 Timișoara 2R
(Argentina) Carlos Berlocq	37	1	1	0	100%	Won (6-1, 7–5) at 2000 Chile F8 1R
(France) Marc Gicquel	37	1	0	1	0%	Lost (6-1, 5–7, 2–6) at 2004 Budaörs QF
(Germany) **Peter Gojowczyk**	39	1	1	0	100%	Won (7–6^{(7–1)}, 2-6, 7–5) at 2007 Germany F6 F
(Russia) **Andrey Kuznetsov**	39	1	0	1	0%	Lost (5–2 ret.) at 2009 Italy F14 1R
(Georgia (country)) Irakli Labadze	42	1	0	1	0%	Lost (6–7^{(4–7)}, 1-6, 7–6^{(7–2)}, 6-1, 4-6) at 2006 Davis Cup PPO
(Slovenia) Grega Žemlja	43	3	2	1	67%	Won (6-2, 2-6, 6-4) at 2010 Umag Q2
(Argentina) Martín Vassallo Argüello	47	2	0	2	0%	Lost (3-6, 2–6) at 2003 Oberstaufen QF
(Spain) Óscar Hernández	48	1	0	1	0%	Lost (3-6, 3–6) at 2000 Hungary F2 QF
(France) Cyril Saulnier	48	1	1	0	100%	Won (6-2, 6–4) at 1998 Hungary F1 SF
(France) Stéphane Robert	50	1	1	0	100%	Won (6-3, 5-7, 6–4) at 2005 Budaörs 2R
(Germany) Daniel Brands	51	1	1	0	100%	Won (7–6^{(8–6)}, 7–5) at 2005 Germany F3 1R
(Austria) Werner Eschauer	52	2	1	1	50%	Won (6–7^{(3–7)}, 7-5, 6–1) at 2002 Oberstaufen Q3
(France) Grégory Carraz	54	2	1	1	50%	Won (5-0 ret.) at 2006 France F5 1R
(Serbia) Boris Pašanski	55	5	0	5	0%	Lost (6–7^{(3–7)}, 2-6) at 2005 Budaörs 1R
(Romania) Marius Copil	56	1	1	0	100%	Won (5–7, 6–0, 6-4) at 2007 Germany F7 1R
(Brazil) Marcos Daniel	56	1	0	1	0%	Lost (4–6, 2-6) at 2006 Prostějov 1R
(Czech Republic) Robin Vik	57	3	1	2	33%	Won (6–4, 6-1) at 2003 Weiden Q1
(Germany) Denis Gremelmayr	59	1	1	0	100%	Won (7–5, 6-3) at 2002 Oberstaufen Q2
(Portugal) Rui Machado	59	1	1	0	100%	Won (6–3, 6–0) at 2007 Germany F12 1R
(France) Nicolas Devilder	60	1	0	1	0%	Lost (5–7, 1-6) at 2006 Košice 2R
(Jamaica) / (Germany) **Dustin Brown**	64	1	0	1	0%	Lost (7–5, 4-6, 6–7^{(2–7)}) at 2007 Germany F16 SF
(Germany) **Tobias Kamke**	64	1	1	0	100%	Won (6–2, 6-3) at 2004 Germany F8 F
(Germany) Lars Burgsmüller	65	1	0	1	0%	Lost (3-6, 2-6) at 2004 Réunion Island 1R
(Denmark) Kristian Pless	65	2	1	1	50%	Lost (3-6, 1-6, 7–6^{(7–2)}, 3-6) at 2001 Davis Cup 2R
(Spain) Pere Riba	65	1	0	1	0%	Lost (4-6, 4-6) at 2008 Zagreb 1R
(Spain) Santiago Ventura	65	1	0	1	0%	Lost (2-6, 4-6) at 2000 Greece F7 1R
(Spain) Iván Navarro	67	1	0	1	0%	Lost (4-6, 6-0, 1-6) at 2001 Slovenia F2 1R
(Italy) Alessio di Mauro	68	3	0	3	0%	Lost (4-6, 2–6) at 2010 Brașov 1R
(Spain) Jacobo Díaz	68	1	1	0	100%	Won (6-1, 6–1) at 2003 Budapest QF
(Slovenia) **Blaž Kavčič**	68	4	3	1	75%	Won (6-3, 7–6^{(10–8)}) at 2008 Prague Q3
(Austria) **Gerald Melzer**	68	1	0	1	0%	Lost (6–7^{(5–7)}, 4-6) at 2010 Umag Q3
(Italy) **Thomas Fabbiano**	70	1	1	0	100%	Won (2–6, 6–1, 6–4) at 2008 Croatia F4 2R
(Czech Republic) Jan Hájek	71	1	0	1	0%	Lost (1–6, 3–6) at 2002 Czech Republic F2 2R
(Estonia) Jürgen Zopp	71	1	0	1	0%	Lost (6–7^{(7–9)}, 1–6, 0–6) at 2010 Davis Cup 1R
(Romania) Răzvan Sabău	74	1	0	1	0%	Lost (6–7^{(6–8)}, 4–6) at 2000 Budapest 1R
(Czech Republic) Jiří Vaněk	74	2	1	1	50%	Lost (1-6, 3–6) at 2008 Ostrava 2R
(France) Jérôme Haehnel	78	1	0	1	0%	Lost (6-0, 1–6, 1–6) at 2004 Manerbio 1R
(Slovenia) **Blaž Rola**	78	1	0	1	0%	Lost (2-6, 6–3, 6–7^{(2–7)}) at 2010 Slovenia F3 1R
(Slovakia) **Norbert Gombos**	80	1	0	1	0%	Lost (2-6, 3–6) at 2010 Austria F6 1R
(Austria) Oliver Marach	82	1	0	1	0%	Lost (5-7, 2–6) at 2004 Timișoara QF
(Argentina) Martín Alund	84	1	1	0	100%	Won (7-5, 6–4) at 2005 Romania F9 QF
(Belgium) Ruben Bemelmans	84	2	2	0	100%	Won (6–2, 6–1) at 2007 Germany F13 QF
(Monaco) Jean-René Lisnard	84	1	0	1	0%	Lost (1–6, 6–3, 6–7^{(1–7)}, 4–6) at 2007 Davis Cup 2R
(Croatia) Roko Karanušić	88	3	1	2	33%	Lost (6-1, 0–6, 0–6) at 2009 Ljubljana 2R
(Croatia) Željko Krajan	88	1	0	1	0%	Lost (4-6, 3–6) at 1995 Hungary Masters Q1
(Germany) Marcello Craca	90	1	0	1	0%	Lost (1-6, 3–6) at 2003 Germany F4 1R
(Spain) Germán Puentes	90	1	0	1	0%	Lost (4-6, 0–6) at 2003 Croatia F8 SF
(Germany) Daniel Elsner	92	1	1	0	100%	Won (2-6, 6–2, 6–3) at 2006 Košice 1R
(Italy) Federico Luzzi	92	1	0	1	0%	Lost (7–6^{(7–5)}, 1-6, 0–6) at 2004 Freudenstadt 2R
(Austria) Alexander Peya	92	1	0	1	0%	Lost (3-6, 0–6) at 1998 Croatia Masters 1R
(Switzerland) **Henri Laaksonen**	93	1	0	1	0%	Lost (2-6, 2-6) at 2011 Austria F3 1R
(Slovakia) **Andrej Martin**	93	2	0	2	0%	Lost (4-6, 6-1, 1-6) at 2008 Ljubljana Q3
(United States) Austin Krajicek	94	1	0	1	0%	Lost (2–6, 6–4, 4–6) at 2007 Dominican Republic F3 2R
(Netherlands) Thomas Schoorel	94	1	1	0	100%	Won (6–4, 4–6, 6–2) at 2009 Netherlands F2 1R
(Bulgaria) Orlin Stanoytchev	96	1	0	1	0%	Lost (6–3, 3–6, 5–7) at 2002 Croatia F1 1R
(Italy) Stefano Galvani	99	1	1	0	100%	Won (6-7, 6–4, 7-6) at 1998 Egypt Masters 1R
(Argentina) Juan Pablo Guzmán	100	1	1	0	100%	Won (6-4, 7-5) at 2003 Oberstaufen 2R
(Netherlands) Melle van Gemerden	100	3	2	1	67%	Lost (6–4, 5–7, 1–6) at 2004 Vacoas Q3
(Italy) **Luca Vanni**	100	1	1	0	100%	Won (4–6, 6–4, 7–5) at 2009 Ljubljana Q2
Total		108	41	67	38%	* Statistics correct as of 26 April 2021
