= 1999 Davis Cup Europe/Africa Zone Group II =

International tennis competition

The Europe/Africa Zone was one of the three zones of the regional Davis Cup competition in 1999.

In the Europe/Africa Zone there were four different tiers, called groups, in which teams competed against each other to advance to the upper tier. Winners in Group II advanced to the Europe/Africa Zone Group I. Teams who lost their respective ties competed in the relegation play-offs, with winning teams remaining in Group II, whereas teams who lost their play-offs were relegated to the Europe/Africa Zone Group III in 2000.

== Participating nations ==
- Bulgaria
- Denmark
- Greece
- Hungary
- Ireland
- Ivory Coast
- Latvia
- Macedonia
- Morocco
- Norway
- Poland
- Senegal
- Slovenia
- Togo
- Turkey
- Yugoslavia

=== Draw ===
Relegation Play-offs
Ljubljana, Slovenia (clay)
Senegal	0
Slovenia	5
Lomé, Togo (hard)
Greece	4
Togo	1
Jūrmala, Latvia (clay)
Latvia	4
Macedonia	1
Istanbul, Turkey (hard)
Yugoslavia	2
Turkey	3

First Round
Aalborg, Denmark (indoor carpet)
Denmark	5
Senegal	0
Dublin, Ireland (indoor carpet)
Slovenia	2
Ireland	3
Budapest, Hungary (clay)
Hungary	5
Greece	0
Plovdiv, Bulgaria (clay)
Togo	0
Bulgaria	5
Jūrmala, Latvia (indoor carpet)
Latvia	2
Poland	3
Abidjan, Ivory Coast (hard)
Macedonia	0
Ivory Coast	5
Casablanca, Morocco (clay)
Yugoslavia	1
Morocco	4
Oslo, Norway (indoor carpet)
Turkey	0
Norway	5

Second Round
Skagen, Denmark (hard)
Denmark	3
Ireland	2
Budapest, Hungary (clay)
Hungary	4
Bulgaria	1
Abidjan, Ivory Coast (hard)
Poland	3
Ivory Coast	1
Oslo, Norway (clay)
Morocco	4
Norway	1

Third Round
Budapest, Hungary (clay)
Denmark	1
Hungary	3
Casablanca, Morocco (clay)
Poland	0
Morocco	5

- Senegal, Togo, Macedonia, and Yugoslavia relegated to Group III in 2000.
- Hungary and Morocco promoted to Group I in 2000.

== First round ==
=== Denmark vs. Senegal ===
Denmark
5
Aalborg Stadium, Aalborg, Denmark
30 April–2 May 1999
Carpet (indoors)

Senegal
0

			1	2	3	4	5
1	(Denmark) (Senegal)	Kenneth Carlsen; Diadji Ka	6; 0	6; 1	6; 0
2	(Denmark) (Senegal)	Kristian Pless; Daouda Ndiaye	6; 2	6; 2	6; 2
3	(Denmark) (Senegal)	Kenneth Carlsen / Frederik Fetterlein; Yahiya Doumbia / Daouda Ndiaye	7^{7} 6^{4}	6; 1	6; 1
4	(Denmark) (Senegal)	Kenneth Carlsen; Daouda Ndiaye	6; 4	6; 0
5	(Denmark) (Senegal)	Kristian Pless; Diadji Ka	6; 0	6; 1

=== Ireland vs. Slovenia ===
Ireland
3
Riverview Club, Dublin, Ireland
30 April–2 May 1999
Carpet (indoors)

Slovenia
2

			1	2	3	4	5
1	(Republic of Ireland) (Slovenia)	Owen Casey; Borut Urh	7^{7} 6^{1}	1; 6	6; 1	6^{2} 7^{7}	7; 5
2	(Republic of Ireland) (Slovenia)	Robert Collins; Iztok Božič	4; 6	6; 3	6; 4	6; 3
3	(Republic of Ireland) (Slovenia)	Owen Casey / Robert Collins; Andrej Kračman / Borut Urh	3; 6	3; 6	3; 6
4	(Republic of Ireland) (Slovenia)	Owen Casey; Iztok Božič	2; 6	6; 3	3; 6	7; 5	6; 3
5	(Republic of Ireland) (Slovenia)	Robert Collins; Marko Tkalec	7^{10} 6^{8}	1; 6	4; 6

=== Hungary vs. Greece ===
Hungary
5
Római Tennis Academy, Budapest, Hungary
30 April–2 May 1999
Clay

Greece
0

			1	2	3	4	5
1	(Hungary) (Greece)	Gergely Kisgyörgy; Anastasios Vasiliadis	6; 0	6; 1	7^{7} 6^{4}
2	(Hungary) (Greece)	Attila Sávolt; Nikos Rovas	2; 6	6^{4} 7^{7}	6; 1	6; 2	7; 5
3	(Hungary) (Greece)	Gábor Köves / Attila Sávolt; Konstantinos Economidis / Anastasios Vasiliadis	6; 4	6^{6} 7^{8}	6; 1	6; 3
4	(Hungary) (Greece)	Attila Sávolt; Konstantinos Economidis	6; 3	6; 4
5	(Hungary) (Greece)	Kornél Bardóczky; Pantelis Moschoutis	6; 4	7^{7} 6^{2}

=== Bulgaria vs. Togo ===
Bulgaria
5
Lokomotiv Tennis Club, Plovdiv, Bulgaria
30 April–2 May 1999
Clay

Togo
0

			1	2	3	4	5
1	(Bulgaria) (Togo)	Milen Velev; Goudjo Gbedey	6; 2	6; 2	6; 2
2	(Bulgaria) (Togo)	Ivaylo Traykov; Jean-Kome Loglo	6; 4	5; 7	6; 3	4; 6	6; 1
3	(Bulgaria) (Togo)	Ivaylo Traykov / Milen Velev; Jean-Kome Loglo / Kossi Loglo	6; 2	6; 4	6; 4
4	(Bulgaria) (Togo)	Ivo Bratanov; Jean-Kome Loglo	6; 2	6; 1
5	(Bulgaria) (Togo)	Todor Enev; Kossi Loglo	6; 0	6; 1

=== Latvia vs. Poland ===
Latvia
2
National Tennis Centre Lielupe, Jūrmala, Latvia
30 April–2 May 1999
Carpet (indoors)

Poland
3

			1	2	3	4	5
1	(Latvia) (Poland)	Alvis Tabors; Bartłomiej Dąbrowski	4; 6	2; 6	2; 6
2	(Latvia) (Poland)	Andris Fiļimonovs; Michał Gawłowski	7^{7} 6^{3}	6^{6} 7^{8}	7; 5	3; 6	6; 3
3	(Latvia) (Poland)	Andris Fiļimonovs / Ivo Lagzdiņš; Bartłomiej Dąbrowski / Michał Gawłowski	3; 6	4; 6	4; 6
4	(Latvia) (Poland)	Andris Fiļimonovs; Piotr Szczepanik	6; 3	6; 0	4; 6	7; 5
5	(Latvia) (Poland)	Ivo Lagzdiņš; Michał Gawłowski	2; 6	6^{3} 7^{7}	6; 3	3; 6

=== Ivory Coast vs. Macedonia ===
Ivory Coast
5
Centre International de Tennis Arthur Ashe, Abidjan, Ivory Coast
30 April–2 May 1999
Hard

Macedonia
0

			1	2	3	4	5
1	(Ivory Coast) (North Macedonia)	Valentin Sanon; Ognen Nikolovski	6; 2	6; 3	6; 1
2	(Ivory Coast) (North Macedonia)	Claude N'Goran; Zoran Ševčenko	7^{7} 6^{2}	6; 0	2; 0			retired
3	(Ivory Coast) (North Macedonia)	Claude N'Goran / Valentin Sanon; Goran Bosalevski / Zoran Ševčenko	6; 2	6; 2	6; 3
4	(Ivory Coast) (North Macedonia)	Claude N'Goran; Goran Sterijovski	6; 3	6; 1
5	(Ivory Coast) (North Macedonia)	Arthur Konan; Goran Bosalevski	2; 6	6; 4	6; 2

=== Morocco vs. Yugoslavia ===
Morocco
4
Complexe Al Amal, Casablanca, Morocco
30 April–2 May 1999
Clay

Yugoslavia
1

			1	2	3	4	5
1	(Morocco) (Federal Republic of Yugoslavia)	Karim Alami; Nikola Gnjatović	6; 3	6; 1	6; 2
2	(Morocco) (Federal Republic of Yugoslavia)	Hicham Arazi; Nebojša Đorđević	6^{8} 7^{10}	1; 6	6; 0	6; 1	6; 1
3	(Morocco) (Federal Republic of Yugoslavia)	Karim Alami / Hicham Arazi; Nebojša Đorđević / Nikola Gnjatović	7; 5	7^{7} 6^{3}	6; 3
4	(Morocco) (Federal Republic of Yugoslavia)	Mounir El Aarej; Nikola Gnjatović	6; 2	6; 2
5	(Morocco) (Federal Republic of Yugoslavia)	Karim Alami; Željko Tošić						w/o

=== Norway vs. Turkey ===
Norway
5
Norwegian Tennis Club, Oslo, Norway
30 April–2 May 1999
Carpet (indoors)

Turkey
0

			1	2	3	4	5
1	(Norway) (Turkey)	Helge Koll-Frafjord; Erhan Oral	6; 1	6; 1	6; 2
2	(Norway) (Turkey)	Jan Frode Andersen; Efe Üstündağ	6; 2	6; 4	6; 1
3	(Norway) (Turkey)	Lars Hjarrand / Helge Røsjø; Mustafa Azkara / Erhan Oral	7; 5	6^{3} 7^{7}	6; 4	5; 7	6; 1
4	(Norway) (Turkey)	Jan Frode Andersen; Erhan Oral	6; 2	6; 4
5	(Norway) (Turkey)	Helge Røsjø; Efe Üstündağ	3; 6	7; 5	6; 2

== Second round ==
=== Denmark vs. Ireland ===
Denmark
3
Skagen Tennis Club, Skagen, Denmark
16–18 July 1999
Hard

Ireland
2

			1	2	3	4	5
1	(Denmark) (Republic of Ireland)	Kenneth Carlsen; Owen Casey	6; 2	4; 6	6; 1	6; 1
2	(Denmark) (Republic of Ireland)	Kristian Pless; John Doran	6; 3	6; 4	6; 4
3	(Denmark) (Republic of Ireland)	Kenneth Carlsen / Frederik Fetterlein; Scott Barron / Owen Casey	4; 6	6; 4	3; 6	4; 6
4	(Denmark) (Republic of Ireland)	Kenneth Carlsen; Scott Barron	6; 2	7; 5	7; 5
5	(Denmark) (Republic of Ireland)	Kristian Pless; Owen Casey	6; 1	3; 6	4; 6

=== Hungary vs. Bulgaria ===
Hungary
4
Római Tennis Academy, Budapest, Hungary
16–18 July 1999
Clay

Bulgaria
1

			1	2	3	4	5
1	(Hungary) (Bulgaria)	Gergely Kisgyörgy; Orlin Stanoytchev	4; 6	4; 6	6; 3	7; 5	6; 3
2	(Hungary) (Bulgaria)	Attila Sávolt; Milen Velev	6; 1	6^{2} 7^{7}	2; 6	0; 6
3	(Hungary) (Bulgaria)	Zoltán Böröczky / Attila Sávolt; Ivaylo Traykov / Milen Velev	6; 3	2; 6	6; 3	3; 6	7; 5
4	(Hungary) (Bulgaria)	Attila Sávolt; Orlin Stanoytchev	6; 4	6; 1	6; 4
5	(Hungary) (Bulgaria)	Gergely Kisgyörgy; Ivaylo Traykov	6; 2	6^{4} 7^{7}	7; 5

=== Ivory Coast vs. Poland ===
Ivory Coast
1
Hôtel Ivoire, Abidjan, Ivory Coast
16–18 July 1999
Hard

Poland
3

			1	2	3	4	5
1	(Ivory Coast) (Poland)	Ilou Lonfo; Michał Chmela	2; 6	6; 4	7; 5	6; 4
2	(Ivory Coast) (Poland)	Valentin Sanon; Michał Gawłowski	3; 6	0; 6	6; 3	6; 3	2; 6
3	(Ivory Coast) (Poland)	Ilou Lonfo / Valentin Sanon; Michał Chmela / Michał Gawłowski	7^{7} 6^{4}	6^{5} 7^{7}	3; 6	6^{5} 7^{7}
4	(Ivory Coast) (Poland)	Valentin Sanon; Michał Chmela	4; 6	4; 6	7^{7} 6^{4}	6; 1	4; 6
5	(Ivory Coast) (Poland)	Ilou Lonfo; Michał Gawłowski						not played

=== Norway vs. Morocco ===
Norway
1
Oslo Tennis Club, Oslo, Norway
16–18 July 1999
Clay

Morocco
4

			1	2	3	4	5
1	(Norway) (Morocco)	Christian Ruud; Hicham Arazi	2; 6	3; 6	6; 4	1; 6
2	(Norway) (Morocco)	Jan Frode Andersen; Younes El Aynaoui	3; 6	2; 6	4; 6
3	(Norway) (Morocco)	Bent-Ove Pedersen / Christian Ruud; Karim Alami / Hicham Arazi	6; 4	6; 1	5; 7	7^{13} 6^{11}
4	(Norway) (Morocco)	Christian Ruud; Younes El Aynaoui	6; 4	6; 4	6^{2} 7^{7}	2; 6	1; 6
5	(Norway) (Morocco)	Jan Frode Andersen; Karim Alami	2; 6	4; 6

== Relegation play-offs ==
=== Slovenia vs. Senegal ===
Slovenia
5
Breskvar Tennis Academy, Ljubljana, Slovenia
16–18 July 1999
Clay

Senegal
0

			1	2	3	4	5
1	(Slovenia) (Senegal)	Marko Tkalec; Daouda Ndiaye	6; 4	6; 1	6; 4
2	(Slovenia) (Senegal)	Andrej Kračman; Thierno Ly	6; 1	6; 1	5; 7	6; 3
3	(Slovenia) (Senegal)	Andrej Kračman / Borut Urh; Thierno Ly / Daouda Ndiaye	6; 1	6; 1	6; 2
4	(Slovenia) (Senegal)	Marko Tkalec; Thierno Ly	6; 2	6; 0
5	(Slovenia) (Senegal)	Andrej Kračman; Wael Zeidan	6; 2	6; 3

=== Togo vs. Greece ===
Togo
1
AAT Tennis Club, Lomé, Togo
16–18 July 1999
Hard

Greece
4

			1	2	3	4	5
1	(Togo) (Greece)	Jean-Kome Loglo; Solon Peppas	7; 5	3; 6	6^{5} 7^{7}	3; 6
2	(Togo) (Greece)	Kossi Loglo; Anastasios Vasiliadis	6; 4	1; 6	5; 7	2; 6
3	(Togo) (Greece)	Jean-Kome Loglo / Kossi Loglo; Konstantinos Economidis / Anastasios Vasiliadis	4; 6	2; 6	2; 6
4	(Togo) (Greece)	Jean-Kome Loglo; Konstantinos Economidis	2; 6	1; 6
5	(Togo) (Greece)	Kossi Loglo; Solon Peppas	7; 5	6; 1

=== Latvia vs. Macedonia ===
Latvia
4
National Tennis Centre Lielupe, Jūrmala, Latvia
16–18 July 1999
Clay

Macedonia
1

			1	2	3	4	5
1	(Latvia) (North Macedonia)	Ģirts Dzelde; Kristian Mitrovski	6; 0	6; 2	6; 2
2	(Latvia) (North Macedonia)	Andris Fiļimonovs; Goran Sterijovski	6; 1	7^{7} 6^{2}	6; 3
3	(Latvia) (North Macedonia)	Ģirts Dzelde / Andris Fiļimonovs; Goran Bosalevski / Goran Sterijovski	6; 2	6; 2	6; 4
4	(Latvia) (North Macedonia)	Oskars Vaskis; Goran Sterijovski	3; 6	6; 2	6; 2
5	(Latvia) (North Macedonia)	Ivo Lagzdiņš; Kristian Mitrovski	2; 6	5; 7

=== Turkey vs. Yugoslavia ===
Turkey
3
T.E.D. Club, Istanbul, Turkey
16–18 July 1999
Hard

Yugoslavia
2

			1	2	3	4	5
1	(Turkey) (Federal Republic of Yugoslavia)	Efe Üstündağ; Dušan Vemić	3; 6	7^{7} 6^{3}	4; 6	3; 6
2	(Turkey) (Federal Republic of Yugoslavia)	Erhan Oral; Nebojša Đorđević	3; 6	7^{7} 6^{2}	6; 4	6; 2
3	(Turkey) (Federal Republic of Yugoslavia)	Mustafa Azkara / Erhan Oral; Nebojša Đorđević / Dušan Vemić	3; 6	7; 5	6; 3	6; 4
4	(Turkey) (Federal Republic of Yugoslavia)	Erhan Oral; Dušan Vemić	1; 6	1; 6	1; 6
5	(Turkey) (Federal Republic of Yugoslavia)	Efe Üstündağ; Nebojša Đorđević	6; 4	6; 4	7^{7} 6^{4}

== Third round ==
=== Hungary vs. Denmark ===
Hungary
3
Római Tennis Academy, Budapest, Hungary
24–26 September 1999
Clay

Denmark
1

			1	2	3	4	5
1	(Hungary) (Denmark)	Gergely Kisgyörgy; Kenneth Carlsen	2; 6	3; 6	6; 4	6; 1	6; 2
2	(Hungary) (Denmark)	Attila Sávolt; Frederik Fetterlein	6; 1	6; 4	4; 6	6; 4
3	(Hungary) (Denmark)	Gábor Köves / Attila Sávolt; Kenneth Carlsen / Frederik Fetterlein	7; 5	7^{7} 6^{3}	3; 6	7^{7} 6^{1}
4	(Hungary) (Denmark)	Zoltán Böröczky; Thomas Larsen	3; 6	6; 4	2; 6
5	(Hungary) (Denmark)	Gergely Kisgyörgy; Frederik Fetterlein						not played

=== Morocco vs. Poland ===
Morocco
5
Olympic Club, Casablanca, Morocco
24–26 September 1999
Clay

Poland
0

			1	2	3	4	5
1	(Morocco) (Poland)	Hicham Arazi; Michał Gawłowski	6; 2	6; 1	6^{5} 7^{7}	6; 3
2	(Morocco) (Poland)	Karim Alami; Michał Chmela	6; 3	6; 3	6; 3
3	(Morocco) (Poland)	Karim Alami / Hicham Arazi; Michał Chmela / Michał Gawłowski	6; 3	7^{7} 6^{4}	6; 1
4	(Morocco) (Poland)	Hicham Arazi; Piotr Szczepanik	6; 2	6; 2
5	(Morocco) (Poland)	Mounir El Aarej; Mariusz Zieliński	7; 5	7; 5
