= 1998 Davis Cup Europe/Africa Zone Group II =

International tennis competition

The Europe/Africa Zone was one of the three zones of the regional Davis Cup competition in 1998.

In the Europe/Africa Zone there were four different tiers, called groups, in which teams competed against each other to advance to the upper tier. Winners in Group II advanced to the Europe/Africa Zone Group I. Teams who lost their respective ties competed in the relegation play-offs, with winning teams remaining in Group II, whereas teams who lost their play-offs were relegated to the Europe/Africa Zone Group III in 1999.

== Participating nations ==
- Belarus
- Bulgaria
- Egypt
- Georgia
- Hungary
- Ireland
- Ivory Coast
- Latvia
- Luxembourg
- Morocco
- Monaco
- Poland
- Portugal
- Senegal
- Slovenia
- Yugoslavia

=== Draw ===
Relegation Play-offs
Sofia, Bulgaria (clay)
Bulgaria	5
Luxembourg	0
Bydgoszcz, Poland (clay)
Poland	4
Egypt	1
Jūrmala, Latvia (clay)
Latvia	5
Georgia	0
Dublin, Ireland (carpet)
Monaco	0
Ireland	5

First Round
Meknes, Morocco (indoor clay)
Morocco	3
Bulgaria	2
Minsk, Belarus (indoor carpet)
Belarus	5
Luxembourg	0
Dakar, Senegal (hard)
Poland	2
Senegal	3
Abidjan, Ivory Coast (hard)
Ivory Coast	3
Egypt	2
Jūrmala, Latvia (indoor carpet)
Yugoslavia	3
Latvia	2
Braga, Portugal (clay)
Georgia	0
Portugal	5
Roquebrune-Cap-Martin, France (clay)
Slovenia	5
Monaco	0
Budapest, Hungary (clay)
Ireland	1
Hungary	4

Second Round
Agadir, Morocco (clay)
Morocco	2
Belarus	3
Dakar, Senegal (hard)
Senegal	2
Ivory Coast	3
Belgrade, Yugoslavia (clay)
Yugoslavia	2
Portugal	3
Budapest, Hungary (clay)
Slovenia	2
Hungary	3

Third Round
Abidjan, Ivory Coast (hard)
Belarus	4
Ivory Coast	1
Albufeira, Portugal (hard)
Portugal	4
Hungary	1

- Luxembourg, Egypt, Georgia, and Monaco relegated to Group III in 1999.
- Belarus and Portugal promoted to Group I in 1999.

== First round ==
=== Morocco vs. Bulgaria ===
Morocco
3
Tennis Club de Meknès, Meknes, Morocco
1–3 May 1998
Clay (indoors)

Bulgaria
2

			1	2	3	4	5
1	(Morocco) (Bulgaria)	Karim Alami; Milen Velev	7^{7} 6^{3}	4; 6	7^{7} 6^{2}	6; 2
2	(Morocco) (Bulgaria)	Mehdi Tahiri; Orlin Stanoytchev	2; 6	6; 2	3; 6	6; 3	2; 6
3	(Morocco) (Bulgaria)	Karim Alami / Mounir El Aarej; Orlin Stanoytchev / Milen Velev	6; 4	7; 5	6; 2
4	(Morocco) (Bulgaria)	Karim Alami; Orlin Stanoytchev	3; 6	6; 3	6^{5} 7^{7}	6; 3	6; 1
5	(Morocco) (Bulgaria)	Mehdi Tahiri; Milen Velev	2; 6	3; 6

=== Belarus vs. Luxembourg ===
Belarus
5
National Olympic Centre, Minsk, Belarus
1–3 May 1998
Carpet (indoors)

Luxembourg
0

			1	2	3	4	5
1	(Belarus) (Luxembourg)	Max Mirnyi; Adrian Graimprey	7; 5	6; 4	6; 4
2	(Belarus) (Luxembourg)	Alexander Shvets; Sacha Thoma	6; 1	6; 2	6; 4
3	(Belarus) (Luxembourg)	Max Mirnyi / Alexander Shvets; Adrian Graimprey / Sacha Thoma	6; 3	6; 2	6; 3
4	(Belarus) (Luxembourg)	Evgeni Mikheev; Roland Theisen	6; 3	6; 2
5	(Belarus) (Luxembourg)	Max Mirnyi; Sacha Thoma	7; 5	6; 3

=== Senegal vs. Poland ===
Senegal
3
Sporting Club de Dakar, Dakar, Senegal
1–3 May 1998
Hard

Poland
2

			1	2	3	4	5
1	(Senegal) (Poland)	Thierno Ly; Jurek Stasiak	3; 6	4; 6	2; 6
2	(Senegal) (Poland)	Yahiya Doumbia; Bartłomiej Dąbrowski	6; 1	3; 6	4; 6	7^{10} 6^{8}	6; 3
3	(Senegal) (Poland)	Yahiya Doumbia / Thierno Ly; Bartłomiej Dąbrowski / Jurek Stasiak	6; 4	6^{0} 7^{7}	6^{4} 7^{7}	6; 4	6; 4
4	(Senegal) (Poland)	Yahiya Doumbia; Jurek Stasiak	6; 2	6; 4	3; 6	2; 6	6; 2
5	(Senegal) (Poland)	Daouda Ndiaye; Bartłomiej Dąbrowski	2; 6	2; 6

=== Ivory Coast vs. Egypt ===
Ivory Coast
3
Centre International de Tennis Arthur Ashe, Abidjan, Ivory Coast
1–3 May 1998
Hard

Egypt
2

			1	2	3	4	5
1	(Ivory Coast) (Egypt)	Claude N'Goran; Amr Ghoneim	6; 2	6; 1	7; 5
2	(Ivory Coast) (Egypt)	Valentin Sanon; Gehad El Deeb	3; 6	6; 3	2; 6	0; 5		retired
3	(Ivory Coast) (Egypt)	Claude N'Goran / Nouhoun Sangaré; Amr Ghoneim / Karim Maamoun	6^{2} 7^{7}	6^{4} 7^{7}	3; 6
4	(Ivory Coast) (Egypt)	Claude N'Goran; Gehad El Deeb	6; 1	6; 4	6; 1
5	(Ivory Coast) (Egypt)	Nouhoun Sangaré; Amr Ghoneim	6^{4} 7^{7}	6; 3	6; 4	4; 6	8; 6

=== Latvia vs. Yugoslavia ===
Latvia
2
National Tennis Center Lielupe, Jūrmala, Latvia
1–3 May 1998
Carpet (indoors)

Yugoslavia
3

			1	2	3	4	5
1	(Latvia) (Federal Republic of Yugoslavia)	Andris Fiļimonovs; Dušan Vemić	6^{7} 7^{9}	7^{7} 6^{5}	6; 4	6; 4
2	(Latvia) (Federal Republic of Yugoslavia)	Ģirts Dzelde; Nenad Zimonjić	0; 6	6; 4	4; 6	5; 7
3	(Latvia) (Federal Republic of Yugoslavia)	Ģirts Dzelde / Nils Ivanovs; Dušan Vemić / Nenad Zimonjić	4; 6	3; 6	1; 6
4	(Latvia) (Federal Republic of Yugoslavia)	Ģirts Dzelde; Dušan Vemić	6; 4	6; 3	6^{8} 7^{10}	1; 6	6; 2
5	(Latvia) (Federal Republic of Yugoslavia)	Andris Fiļimonovs; Nenad Zimonjić	3; 6	4; 6	2; 6

=== Portugal vs. Georgia ===
Portugal
5
Braga Tennis Club, Braga, Portugal
1–3 May 1998
Clay

Georgia
0

			1	2	3	4	5
1	(Portugal) (Georgia (country))	Nuno Marques; Irakli Kunchulia	6; 0	6; 3	6; 2
2	(Portugal) (Georgia (country))	João Cunha e Silva; Vladimir Margalitadze	6; 2	6; 3	6; 3
3	(Portugal) (Georgia (country))	Emanuel Couto / Bernardo Mota; Vladimir Margalitadze / Givi Samkharadze	7^{7} 6^{3}	6; 1	6; 3
4	(Portugal) (Georgia (country))	Nuno Marques; Vladimir Margalitadze	7; 5	6; 3
5	(Portugal) (Georgia (country))	João Cunha e Silva; Givi Samkharadze	6; 0	6; 3

=== Monaco vs. Slovenia ===
Monaco
0
Monte Carlo Country Club, Roquebrune-Cap-Martin, France
1–3 May 1998
Clay

Slovenia
5

			1	2	3	4	5
1	(Monaco) (Slovenia)	Christophe Bosio; Iztok Božič	3; 6	2; 6	2; 6
2	(Monaco) (Slovenia)	Sébastien Graeff; Borut Urh	1; 6	2; 6	3; 6
3	(Monaco) (Slovenia)	Christophe Bosio / Sébastien Graeff; Andrej Kraševec / Borut Urh	4; 6	6; 4	1; 6	3; 6
4	(Monaco) (Slovenia)	Sébastien Graeff; Marko Tkalec	4; 6	2; 6
5	(Monaco) (Slovenia)	Christophe Bosio; Andrej Kraševec	6; 3	4; 6	2; 6

=== Hungary vs. Ireland ===
Hungary
4
Római Tennis Academy, Budapest, Hungary
1–3 May 1998
Clay

Ireland
1

			1	2	3	4	5
1	(Hungary) (Republic of Ireland)	Norbert Mazány; Scott Barron	6; 4	0; 6	2; 6	6; 3	9; 7
2	(Hungary) (Republic of Ireland)	Attila Sávolt; John Doran	6; 1	6; 3	6; 3
3	(Hungary) (Republic of Ireland)	Kornél Bardóczky / Attila Sávolt; Owen Casey / Tom Hamilton	6; 3	6; 4	1; 6	6; 1
4	(Hungary) (Republic of Ireland)	Attila Sávolt; Scott Barron	6; 4	6; 2
5	(Hungary) (Republic of Ireland)	Norbert Mazány; John Doran	3; 6	6; 3	3; 6

== Second round ==
=== Morocco vs. Belarus ===
Morocco
2
Sporting Club, Agadir, Morocco
17–19 July 1998
Clay

Belarus
3

			1	2	3	4	5
1	(Morocco) (Belarus)	Hicham Arazi; Alexander Shvets	6; 3	4; 6	7; 5	6; 4
2	(Morocco) (Belarus)	Mounir El Aarej; Vladimir Voltchkov	6; 2	3; 6	2; 6	4; 6
3	(Morocco) (Belarus)	Hicham Arazi / Mounir El Aarej; Max Mirnyi / Vladimir Voltchkov	7^{7} 6^{3}	7^{7} 6^{5}	6^{3} 7^{7}	3; 6	4; 6
4	(Morocco) (Belarus)	Hicham Arazi; Vladimir Voltchkov	2; 6	6^{4} 7^{7}	6; 3	6; 4	6; 4
5	(Morocco) (Belarus)	Mounir El Aarej; Alexander Shvets	7; 5	2; 6	6; 3	4; 6	5; 7

=== Senegal vs. Ivory Coast ===
Senegal
2
Olympic Club, Dakar, Senegal
17–19 July 1998
Hard

Ivory Coast
3

			1	2	3	4	5
1	(Senegal) (Ivory Coast)	Jean-Noël Said; Valentin Sanon	1; 6	1; 6	0; 6
2	(Senegal) (Ivory Coast)	Yahiya Doumbia; Claude N'Goran	6; 4	6; 4	6^{2} 7^{7}	4; 6	6; 4
3	(Senegal) (Ivory Coast)	Yahiya Doumbia / Thierno Ly; Ilou Lonfo / Claude N'Goran	4; 6	7^{11} 6^{9}	3; 6	6^{4} 7^{7}
4	(Senegal) (Ivory Coast)	Yahiya Doumbia; Valentin Sanon	6; 2	6; 4	6; 3
5	(Senegal) (Ivory Coast)	Thierno Ly; Claude N'Goran	1; 6	4; 6	1; 6

=== Yugoslavia vs. Portugal ===
Yugoslavia
2
Dril Tennis Club, Belgrade, Yugoslavia
17–19 July 1998
Clay

Portugal
3

			1	2	3	4	5
1	(Federal Republic of Yugoslavia) (Portugal)	Dušan Vemić; João Cunha e Silva	7^{7} 6^{3}	6; 3	1; 6	6; 3
2	(Federal Republic of Yugoslavia) (Portugal)	Nenad Zimonjić; Nuno Marques	6; 3	0; 6	6; 2	3; 6	18; 20
3	(Federal Republic of Yugoslavia) (Portugal)	Nebojša Đorđević / Dušan Vemić; Emanuel Couto / João Cunha e Silva	7^{7} 6^{5}	6; 4	6^{2} 7^{7}	2; 6	3; 6
4	(Federal Republic of Yugoslavia) (Portugal)	Dušan Vemić; Nuno Marques	3; 6	7^{9} 6^{7}	6; 3	6; 3
5	(Federal Republic of Yugoslavia) (Portugal)	Nenad Zimonjić; João Cunha e Silva	6; 0	7^{7} 6^{2}	3; 6	5; 7	1; 6

=== Hungary vs. Slovenia ===
Hungary
3
Római Tennis Academy, Budapest, Hungary
17–19 July 1998
Clay

Slovenia
2

			1	2	3	4	5
1	(Hungary) (Slovenia)	Attila Sávolt; Borut Urh	6; 2	6; 4	6; 3
2	(Hungary) (Slovenia)	Kornél Bardóczky; Iztok Božič	6; 0	6; 3	1; 6	6; 4
3	(Hungary) (Slovenia)	Gábor Köves / Attila Sávolt; Iztok Božič / Andrej Kračman	6; 4	7; 5	6; 2
4	(Hungary) (Slovenia)	Attila Sávolt; Marko Tkalec	5; 7	4; 6
5	(Hungary) (Slovenia)	Kornél Bardóczky; Andrej Kračman	6; 4	5; 7	3; 6

== Relegation play-offs ==
=== Bulgaria vs. Luxembourg ===
Bulgaria
5
Academic Tennis Club, Sofia, Bulgaria
17–19 July 1998
Clay

Luxembourg
0

			1	2	3	4	5
1	(Bulgaria) (Luxembourg)	Milen Velev; Pascal Schaul	6; 3	6; 1	7; 5
2	(Bulgaria) (Luxembourg)	Orlin Stanoytchev; Mike Scheidweiler	6; 2	6; 2	6; 1
3	(Bulgaria) (Luxembourg)	Orlin Stanoytchev / Milen Velev; Adrian Graimprey / Pascal Schaul	6; 3	6; 2	6; 4
4	(Bulgaria) (Luxembourg)	Ivaylo Traykov; Pascal Schaul	6; 3	6; 1
5	(Bulgaria) (Luxembourg)	Ivo Bratanov; Mike Scheidweiler	5; 7	6; 2	6; 2

=== Poland vs. Egypt ===
Poland
4
Polonia Bydgoszcz, Bydgoszcz, Poland
17–19 July 1998
Clay

Egypt
1

			1	2	3	4	5
1	(Poland) (Egypt)	Bartłomiej Dąbrowski; Tamer El-Sawy	6; 2	6; 3	6; 3
2	(Poland) (Egypt)	Michał Chmela; Amr Ghoneim	6; 1	6; 1	6; 4
3	(Poland) (Egypt)	Michał Chmela / Bartłomiej Dąbrowski; Tamer El-Sawy / Hisham Hemeda	6; 0	7^{7} 6^{2}	6; 3
4	(Poland) (Egypt)	Jurek Stasiak; Karim Maamoun	5; 7	6; 2	6; 3
5	(Poland) (Egypt)	Piotr Szczepanik; Amr Ghoneim	4; 6	4; 6

=== Latvia vs. Georgia ===
Latvia
5
National Tennis Center Lielupe, Jūrmala, Latvia
17–19 July 1998
Clay

Georgia
0

			1	2	3	4	5
1	(Latvia) (Georgia (country))	Ģirts Dzelde; Givi Samkharadze	6; 3	4; 6	6; 3	6; 0
2	(Latvia) (Georgia (country))	Andris Fiļimonovs; Irakli Kunchulia	6; 2	6; 3	3; 6	6; 3
3	(Latvia) (Georgia (country))	Ģirts Dzelde / Andris Fiļimonovs; David Katcharava / Givi Samkharadze	6; 1	6; 3	6; 3
4	(Latvia) (Georgia (country))	Andris Fiļimonovs; Givi Samkharadze	6; 3	6; 2
5	(Latvia) (Georgia (country))	Ģirts Dzelde; Irakli Kunchulia	6; 3	6; 1

=== Ireland vs. Monaco ===
Ireland
5
Riverview Club, Dublin, Ireland
17–19 July 1998
Carpet

Monaco
0

			1	2	3	4	5
1	(Republic of Ireland) (Monaco)	John Doran; Christophe Bosio	6; 3	6; 3	6; 1
2	(Republic of Ireland) (Monaco)	Owen Casey; Sébastien Graeff	6; 2	6; 3	6; 1
3	(Republic of Ireland) (Monaco)	Owen Casey / Tom Hamilton; Christophe Boggetti / Sébastien Graeff	7^{7} 6^{2}	6; 4	6; 1
4	(Republic of Ireland) (Monaco)	George McGill; Christophe Bosio	6; 3	3; 6	7; 5
5	(Republic of Ireland) (Monaco)	John Doran; Sébastien Graeff	7^{7} 6^{1}	6^{6} 7^{8}	7^{7} 6^{5}

== Third round ==
=== Ivory Coast vs. Belarus ===
Ivory Coast
1
Centre International de Tennis Arthur Ashe, Abidjan, Ivory Coast
25–27 September 1998
Hard

Belarus
4

			1	2	3	4	5
1	(Ivory Coast) (Belarus)	Valentin Sanon; Max Mirnyi	1; 6	6^{4} 7^{7}	6^{6} 7^{8}
2	(Ivory Coast) (Belarus)	Claude N'Goran; Vladimir Voltchkov	5; 7	6^{6} 7^{8}	6^{6} 7^{8}
3	(Ivory Coast) (Belarus)	Ilou Lonfo / Claude N'Goran; Max Mirnyi / Vladimir Voltchkov	3; 6	7^{7} 6^{3}	3; 6	6; 4	5; 7
4	(Ivory Coast) (Belarus)	Valentin Sanon; Alexander Shvets	5; 7	4; 6
5	(Ivory Coast) (Belarus)	Claude N'Goran; Evgeni Mikheev	6; 4	6; 1

=== Portugal vs. Hungary ===
Portugal
4
Miguel Academy, Albufeira, Portugal
25–27 September 1998
Hard

Hungary
1

			1	2	3	4	5
1	(Portugal) (Hungary)	Nuno Marques; Gergely Kisgyörgy	5; 7	7^{7} 6^{4}	6; 0	6; 3
2	(Portugal) (Hungary)	João Cunha e Silva; Attila Sávolt	6; 1	6; 4	6; 3
3	(Portugal) (Hungary)	Emanuel Couto / Nuno Marques; Gábor Köves / Attila Sávolt	0; 6	7^{7} 6^{4}	6; 3	2; 6	9; 7
4	(Portugal) (Hungary)	Nuno Marques; Balázs Veress	6; 3	6; 3
5	(Portugal) (Hungary)	André Lopes; Gergely Kisgyörgy	3; 6	6; 3	2; 6
