= 2007 Davis Cup Europe/Africa Zone Group II =

International tennis competition

The Europe/Africa Zone was one of the three zones of the regional Davis Cup competition in 2007.

In the Europe/Africa Zone there were four different tiers, called groups, in which teams competed against each other to advance to the upper tier. Winners in Group II advanced to the Europe/Africa Zone Group I. Teams who lost their respective ties competed in the relegation play-offs, with winning teams remaining in Group II, whereas teams who lost their play-offs were relegated to the Europe/Africa Zone Group III in 2008.

== Participating nations ==
- Algeria
- Bulgaria
- Cyprus
- Denmark
- Estonia
- Finland
- Greece
- Hungary
- Latvia
- Monaco
- Morocco
- Nigeria
- Norway
- Poland
- Slovenia
- Ukraine

=== Draw ===
Relegation Play-offs
Hornbæk, Denmark (hard)
Denmark	3
Estonia	0
Lagos, Nigeria (hard)
S	Ukraine	5
Nigeria	0
Nicosia, Cyprus (clay)
S	Bulgaria	1
Cyprus	4
Svingvoll, Norway (hard)
S	Algeria	4
Norway	1

First Round
Agdal, Morocco (clay)
S	Morocco	4
Denmark	1
Tallinn, Estonia (indoor carpet)
S	Slovenia	3
Estonia	2
Ioannina, Greece (clay)
S	Ukraine	2
Greece	3
Abuja, Nigeria (hard)
S	Poland	5
Nigeria	0
Jūrmala, Latvia (indoor carpet)
Latvia	4
S	Bulgaria	1
Nicosia, Cyprus (clay)
Cyprus	2
S	Finland	3
Algiers, Algeria (clay)
Monaco	5
S	Algeria	0
Oslo, Norway (indoor hard)
Norway	1
S	Hungary	4

Second Round
Portorož, Slovenia (hard)
S	Morocco	3
S	Slovenia	2
Thessaloniki, Greece (clay)
Greece	0
S	Poland	5
Tampere, Finland (clay)
Latvia	3
S	Finland	2
Budapest, Hungary (clay)
Monaco	4
S	Hungary	1

Third Round
Puszczykowo, Poland (indoor carpet)
S	Morocco	1
S	Poland	4
Jūrmala, Latvia (indoor carpet)
Latvia	5
Monaco	0

- Bulgaria, Norway, Latvia, and Poland relegated to Group III in 2008.
- Estonia and Nigeria promoted to Group I in 2008.

== First round ==
=== Morocco vs. Denmark ===
Morocco
4
Union Sportive des Cheminots du Maroc, Agdal, Morocco
6–8 April 2007
Clay

Denmark
1

			1	2	3	4	5
1	(Morocco) (Denmark)	Rabie Chaki; Frederik Nielsen	6; 4	6; 2	6; 3
2	(Morocco) (Denmark)	Younes El Aynaoui; Rasmus Nørby	6; 0	6; 3	6; 4
3	(Morocco) (Denmark)	Rabie Chaki / Mounir El Aarej; Frederik Nielsen / Rasmus Nørby	6; 4	2; 6	6^{6} 7^{8}	3; 6
4	(Morocco) (Denmark)	Younes El Aynaoui; Frederik Nielsen	6; 3	7; 5	6; 4
5	(Morocco) (Denmark)	Rabie Chaki; Martin Pedersen	6; 3	4; 6	6; 4

=== Estonia vs. Slovenia ===
Estonia
2
Tondiraba Tennisekeskus, Tallinn, Estonia
6–8 April 2007
Carpet (indoors)

Slovenia
3

			1	2	3	4	5
1	(Estonia) (Slovenia)	Jürgen Zopp; Grega Žemlja	6; 4	4; 6	6^{3} 7^{7}	3; 6
2	(Estonia) (Slovenia)	Mait Künnap; Marko Tkalec	7^{7} 6^{5}	2; 6	7^{12} 6^{10}	7^{7} 6^{5}
3	(Estonia) (Slovenia)	Mait Künnap / Jürgen Zopp; Luka Gregorc / Grega Žemlja	6; 2	3; 6	3; 6	7^{7} 6^{5}	6; 4
4	(Estonia) (Slovenia)	Mait Künnap; Grega Žemlja	3; 6	2; 6	6; 3	7^{7} 6^{2}	3; 6
5	(Estonia) (Slovenia)	Jürgen Zopp; Luka Gregorc	4; 6	5; 7	2; 6

=== Greece vs. Ukraine ===
Greece
3
Gianniotiko Saloni, Parko Pirsinella, Ioannina, Greece
6–8 April 2007
Clay

Ukraine
2

			1	2	3	4	5
1	(Greece) (Ukraine)	Alexandros Jakoubovits; Sergiy Stakhovsky	3; 6	1; 6	2; 6
2	(Greece) (Ukraine)	Konstantinos Economidis; Sergei Bubka	6; 3	6; 2	6; 4
3	(Greece) (Ukraine)	Konstantinos Economidis / Alexandros Jakoubovits; Sergiy Stakhovsky / Orest Tereshchuk	1; 6	4; 6	6^{4} 7^{7}
4	(Greece) (Ukraine)	Konstantinos Economidis; Sergiy Stakhovsky	3; 6	6; 2	3; 6	6; 4	6; 3
5	(Greece) (Ukraine)	Alexandros Jakoubovits; Alexandr Dolgopolov	7^{7} 6^{3}	6; 3	7; 5

=== Nigeria vs. Poland ===
Nigeria
0
Abuja National Stadium, Abuja, Nigeria
6–8 April 2007
Hard

Poland
5

			1	2	3	4	5
1	(Nigeria) (Poland)	Jonathan Igbinovia; Łukasz Kubot	3; 6	2; 6	6^{4} 7^{7}
2	(Nigeria) (Poland)	Abdul-Mumin Babalola; Dawid Olejniczak	1; 6	4; 6	3; 6
3	(Nigeria) (Poland)	Abdul-Mumin Babalola / Jonathan Igbinovia; Mariusz Fyrstenberg / Marcin Matkowski	6^{4} 7^{7}	5; 7	6; 4	1; 6
4	(Nigeria) (Poland)	Abdul-Mumin Babalola; Mariusz Fyrstenberg	4; 6	4; 6
5	(Nigeria) (Poland)	Jonathan Igbinovia; Dawid Olejniczak	3; 6	6; 2	3; 6

=== Latvia vs. Bulgaria ===
Latvia
4
Tennis Centre Lielupe, Jūrmala, Latvia
6–8 April 2007
Carpet (indoors)

Bulgaria
1

			1	2	3	4	5
1	(Latvia) (Bulgaria)	Andis Juška; Todor Enev	6^{5} 7^{7}	6; 3	6; 3	7^{7} 6^{3}
2	(Latvia) (Bulgaria)	Ernests Gulbis; Ivaylo Traykov	6; 3	6; 2	6; 3
3	(Latvia) (Bulgaria)	Ernests Gulbis / Deniss Pavlovs; Ilia Kushev / Ivaylo Traykov	7; 5	6; 4	6; 2
4	(Latvia) (Bulgaria)	Deniss Pavlovs; Yordan Kanev	6; 3	6; 1
5	(Latvia) (Bulgaria)	Rihards Emuliņš; Ivaylo Traykov	2; 6	5; 7

=== Cyprus vs. Finland ===
Cyprus
2
National Tennis Centre, Nicosia, Cyprus
6–8 April 2007
Clay

Finland
3

			1	2	3	4	5
1	(Cyprus) (Finland)	Marcos Baghdatis; Juho Paukku	6; 3	6; 3	7^{7} 6^{3}
2	(Cyprus) (Finland)	Photos Kallias; Jarkko Nieminen	1; 6	3; 6	1; 6
3	(Cyprus) (Finland)	Marcos Baghdatis / Photos Kallias; Tuomas Ketola / Jarkko Nieminen	6; 4	6^{6} 7^{8}	2; 6	3; 6
4	(Cyprus) (Finland)	Marcos Baghdatis; Jarkko Nieminen	6; 2	6; 4	6; 3
5	(Cyprus) (Finland)	Photos Kallias; Timo Nieminen	6; 2	2; 6	0; 6	1; 6

=== Algeria vs. Monaco ===
Algeria
0
Office du Complexe Olympique Mohamed Boudiaf, Algiers, Algeria
6–8 April 2007
Clay

Monaco
5

			1	2	3	4	5
1	(Algeria) (Monaco)	Abdelhak Hameurlaïne; Benjamin Balleret	3; 6	2; 6	2; 6
2	(Algeria) (Monaco)	Slimane Saoudi; Jean-René Lisnard	5; 7	4; 6	4; 6
3	(Algeria) (Monaco)	Abdelhak Hameurlaïne / Slimane Saoudi; Guillaume Couillard / Jean-René Lisnard	3; 6	5; 7	7^{8} 6^{6}	2; 6
4	(Algeria) (Monaco)	Mohamed-Redha Ouahab; Benjamin Balleret	1; 6	1; 6
5	(Algeria) (Monaco)	Mehdi Bouabbane; Guillaume Couillard	0; 6	2; 6

=== Norway vs. Hungary ===
Norway
1
Riksanlegget For Tennis, Oslo, Norway
6–8 April 2007
Hard (indoors)

Hungary
4

			1	2	3	4	5
1	(Norway) (Hungary)	Frederik Sletting-Johnsen; Kornél Bardóczky	6; 4	6^{5} 7^{7}	2; 6	5; 7
2	(Norway) (Hungary)	Stian Boretti; Sebő Kiss	6^{5} 7^{7}	2; 6	6; 1	6; 3	1; 6
3	(Norway) (Hungary)	Stian Boretti / Frederik Sletting-Johnsen; Kornél Bardóczky / Gergely Kisgyörgy	6; 4	6^{5} 7^{7}	6^{4} 7^{7}	2; 6
4	(Norway) (Hungary)	Philip Riise-Hansen; Ádám Kellner	2; 6	4; 6
5	(Norway) (Hungary)	Frederik Sletting-Johnsen; Sebő Kiss	6; 4	4; 6	6; 2

== Second round ==
=== Slovenia vs. Morocco ===
Slovenia
2
ŠRC Marina Portorož, Portorož, Slovenia
20–22 July 2007
Hard

Morocco
3

			1	2	3	4	5
1	(Slovenia) (Morocco)	Marko Tkalec; Rabie Chaki	6; 3	7^{7} 6^{1}	7^{7} 6^{5}
2	(Slovenia) (Morocco)	Luka Gregorc; Younes El Aynaoui	6^{1} 7^{7}	4; 6	3; 6
3	(Slovenia) (Morocco)	Luka Gregorc / Grega Žemlja; Reda El Amrani / Younes El Aynaoui	6^{2} 7^{7}	6; 4	6; 4	6; 4
4	(Slovenia) (Morocco)	Grega Žemlja; Younes El Aynaoui	6^{2} 7^{7}	2; 6	4; 6
5	(Slovenia) (Morocco)	Luka Gregorc; Rabie Chaki	4; 6	4; 6	4; 6

=== Greece vs. Poland ===
Greece
0
Thessaloniki Tennis Club, Thessaloniki, Greece
20–22 July 2007
Clay

Poland
5

			1	2	3	4	5
1	(Greece) (Poland)	Konstantinos Economidis; Michał Przysiężny	3; 6	6; 3	4; 6	3; 6
2	(Greece) (Poland)	Paris Gemouchidis; Łukasz Kubot	2; 6	0; 6	2; 6
3	(Greece) (Poland)	Eleftherios- Spyridon Alexiou / Paris Gemouchidis; Mariusz Fyrstenberg / Marcin Matkowski	4; 6	0; 6	1; 6
4	(Greece) (Poland)	Eleftherios- Spyridon Alexiou; Marcin Matkowski	1; 6	2; 6
5	(Greece) (Poland)	Paris Gemouchidis; Mariusz Fyrstenberg	2; 6	4; 6

=== Finland vs. Latvia ===
Finland
2
Pyynikki Tennis Stadion, Tampere, Finland
20–22 July 2007
Clay

Latvia
3

			1	2	3	4	5
1	(Finland) (Latvia)	Juho Paukku; Ernests Gulbis	5; 7	1; 6	2; 6
2	(Finland) (Latvia)	Jarkko Nieminen; Andis Juška	6; 1	7^{7} 6^{3}	6; 2
3	(Finland) (Latvia)	Tuomas Ketola / Jarkko Nieminen; Ernests Gulbis / Deniss Pavlovs	2; 6	4; 6	3; 6
4	(Finland) (Latvia)	Timo Nieminen; Ernests Gulbis	1; 6	4; 6	6; 4	2; 6
5	(Finland) (Latvia)	Juho Paukku; Kārlis Lejnieks	6; 1	6; 4

=== Hungary vs. Monaco ===
Hungary
1
Római Teniszakadémia, Budapest, Hungary
20–22 July 2007
Clay

Monaco
4

			1	2	3	4	5
1	(Hungary) (Monaco)	Sebő Kiss; Benjamin Balleret	1; 6	3; 6	3; 6
2	(Hungary) (Monaco)	Kornél Bardóczky; Jean-René Lisnard	1; 6	6; 3	6^{1} 7^{7}	4; 6
3	(Hungary) (Monaco)	Kornél Bardóczky / Sebő Kiss; Guillaume Couillard / Jean-René Lisnard	6; 1	5; 7	4; 6	6; 4	6; 2
4	(Hungary) (Monaco)	Kornél Bardóczky; Benjamin Balleret	7^{7} 6^{5}	7; 5	4; 6	0; 6	0; 6
5	(Hungary) (Monaco)	Ádám Kellner; Jean-René Lisnard	4; 6	2; 6

== Relegation play-offs ==
=== Denmark vs. Estonia ===
Denmark
3
Havreholm Castle, Hornbæk, Denmark
20–22 July 2007
Hard

Estonia
0

			1	2	3	4	5
1	(Denmark) (Estonia)	Frederik Nielsen; Mait Künnap	6; 2	6; 2	7^{7} 6^{5}
2	(Denmark) (Estonia)	Kenneth Carlsen; Jaak Põldma	7^{12} 6^{10}	6; 3	6; 0
3	(Denmark) (Estonia)	Kenneth Carlsen / Frederik Nielsen; Mait Künnap / Alti Vahkal	6; 4	6; 2	6; 4
4	(Denmark) (Estonia)	Kenneth Carlsen; Mait Künnap						not played
5	(Denmark) (Estonia)	Martin Pedersen; Jürgen Zopp						not played

=== Nigeria vs. Ukraine ===
Nigeria
0
Lagos Lawn Tennis Club, Lagos, Nigeria
20–22 July 2007
Hard

Ukraine
5

			1	2	3	4	5
1	(Nigeria) (Ukraine)	Abdul-Mumin Babalola; Sergei Bubka	1; 6	4; 6	2; 6
2	(Nigeria) (Ukraine)	Jonathan Igbinovia; Sergiy Stakhovsky	2; 6	0; 6	3; 6
3	(Nigeria) (Ukraine)	Candy Idoko / Lawal Shehu; Sergiy Stakhovsky / Orest Tereshchuk	3; 6	2; 6	4; 6
4	(Nigeria) (Ukraine)	Candy Idoko; Artem Smirnov	3; 6	2; 6
5	(Nigeria) (Ukraine)	Lawal Shehu; Sergei Bubka	6^{11} 7^{13}	6; 2	2; 6

=== Cyprus vs. Bulgaria ===
Cyprus
4
National Tennis Centre, Nicosia, Cyprus
20–22 July 2007
Clay

Bulgaria
1

			1	2	3	4	5
1	(Cyprus) (Bulgaria)	Photos Kallias; Ivaylo Traykov	7^{7} 6^{2}	6; 1	6; 2
2	(Cyprus) (Bulgaria)	Marcos Baghdatis; Yordan Kanev	6; 2	6; 2	6; 2
3	(Cyprus) (Bulgaria)	Marcos Baghdatis / Photos Kallias; Todor Enev / Ilia Kushev	6; 2	6; 3	6; 3
4	(Cyprus) (Bulgaria)	Marcos Baghdatis; Todor Enev	6; 1	6; 3
5	(Cyprus) (Bulgaria)	Petros Baghdatis; Yordan Kanev	4; 6	3; 6

=== Norway vs. Algeria ===
Norway
1
Thon Gausdal, 2657 Svingvoll, Norway
20–22 July 2007
Hard

Algeria
4

			1	2	3	4	5
1	(Norway) (Algeria)	Stian Boretti; Slimane Saoudi	7; 5	6; 4	6; 4
2	(Norway) (Algeria)	Erling Tveit; Lamine Ouahab	4; 6	3; 6	0; 6
3	(Norway) (Algeria)	Stian Boretti / Frederik Sletting-Johnsen; Lamine Ouahab / Slimane Saoudi	2; 6	6; 2	5; 7	2; 6
4	(Norway) (Algeria)	Stian Boretti; Lamine Ouahab	4; 6	5; 7	3; 6
5	(Norway) (Algeria)	Frederik Sletting-Johnsen; Slimane Saoudi	7; 5	1; 6	6^{3} 7^{7}

== Third round ==
=== Poland vs. Morocco ===
Poland
4
Centrum Tenisowe ANGIE Sp.z o.o, Puszczykowo, Poland
21–23 September 2007
Carpet (indoors)

Morocco
1

			1	2	3	4	5
1	(Poland) (Morocco)	Michał Przysiężny; Mounir El Aarej	6; 2	6; 4	6; 1
2	(Poland) (Morocco)	Dawid Olejniczak; Rabie Chaki	6; 4	6^{3} 7^{7}	6^{3} 7^{7}	7^{7} 6^{4}	9; 11
3	(Poland) (Morocco)	Mariusz Fyrstenberg / Marcin Matkowski; Reda El Amrani / Mehdi Ziadi	6; 3	6; 4	6; 2
4	(Poland) (Morocco)	Michał Przysiężny; Rabie Chaki	6; 2	6; 4	6; 4
5	(Poland) (Morocco)	Marcin Matkowski; Reda El Amrani	6; 1	6; 4

=== Latvia vs. Monaco ===
Latvia
5
Tennis Centre Lielupe, Jūrmala, Latvia
21–23 September 2007
Carpet (indoors)

Monaco
0

			1	2	3	4	5
1	(Latvia) (Monaco)	Ernests Gulbis; Jean-René Lisnard	6; 1					retired
2	(Latvia) (Monaco)	Andis Juška; Benjamin Balleret	6; 4	6; 4	7; 5
3	(Latvia) (Monaco)	Ernests Gulbis / Deniss Pavlovs; Benjamin Balleret / Guillaume Couillard	3; 6	7; 5	6; 3	7; 5
4	(Latvia) (Monaco)	Kārlis Lejnieks; Benjamin Balleret	7^{7} 6^{4}	6; 2
5	(Latvia) (Monaco)	Andis Juška; Guillaume Couillard	4; 6	6; 3	6; 2
