= 2008 Davis Cup Europe/Africa Zone Group II =

International tennis competition

The European and African Zone is one of the three zones of regional Davis Cup competition in 2008.

In the European and African Zone there are four different groups in which teams compete against each other to advance to the next group.

== Participating teams ==
- Algeria
- Cyprus
- Denmark
- Egypt
- Finland
- Greece
- Hungary
- Ireland
- Luxembourg
- Monaco
- Morocco
- Portugal
- Slovenia
- South Africa
- Tunisia
- Ukraine

== Draw ==
Play-offs
Hanko, Finland (clay)
1	Luxembourg	2
7	Finland	3
Thessaloniki, Greece (clay)
3	Hungary	5
Greece	0
Cairo, Egypt (clay)
Egypt	3
4	Morocco	2
Tunis, Tunisia (clay)
8	Slovenia	4
Tunisia	1

First round
Esch-sur-Alzette, Luxembourg (indoor hard)
1	Luxembourg	0
Denmark	5
Helsinki, Finland (indoor hard)
7	Finland	1
South Africa	4
Algiers, Algeria (clay)
3	Hungary	2
Algeria	3
Roquebrune-Cap-Martin, France (clay)
5	Monaco	3
Greece	2
Cherkasy, Ukraine (indoor hard)
Egypt	0
6	Ukraine	5
Dublin, Ireland (indoor carpet)
Ireland	3
4	Morocco	2
Nicosia, Cyprus (hard)
Cyprus	3
8	Slovenia	2
Estoril, Portugal (clay)
Tunisia	1
2	Portugal	4

Second round
Johannesburg, South Africa (hard)
Denmark	0
South Africa	5
Roquebrune-Cap-Martin, France (clay)
Algeria	0
5	Monaco	5
Dublin, Ireland (grass)
6	Ukraine	3
Ireland	2
Porto, Portugal (clay)
Cyprus	0
2	Portugal	5

Third round
Roquebrune-Cap-Martin, France (clay)
South Africa	3
5	Monaco	2
Dnipropetrovsk, Ukraine (indoor hard)
6	Ukraine	5
2	Portugal	0

- Luxembourg, Greece, Morocco, and Tunisia relegated to Group III in 2009.
- South Africa and Ukraine promoted to Group I in 2009.

== First round matches ==
=== Luxembourg vs. Denmark ===
Luxembourg
0
National Tennis Centre, Esch-sur-Alzette, Luxembourg
11–13 April 2008
hard (indoors)

Denmark
5

			1	2	3	4	5
1	(Luxembourg) (Denmark)	Roman Margoulis; Frederik Nielsen	3; 6	1; 6	2; 6
2	(Luxembourg) (Denmark)	Philippe Grandjean; Martin Pedersen	5; 7	6; 3	1; 6	1; 6
3	(Luxembourg) (Denmark)	Philippe Grandjean / Tom Maquel; Frederik Nielsen / Rasmus Nørby	1; 6	3; 6	0; 6
4	(Luxembourg) (Denmark)	Philippe Grandjean; Rasmus Nørby	3; 6	1; 6
5	(Luxembourg) (Denmark)	Roman Margoulis; Martin Pedersen	2; 6	2; 6

=== Finland vs. South Africa ===
Finland
1
Tali Tennis Center, Helsinki, Finland
11–13 April 2008
hard (indoors)

South Africa
4

			1	2	3	4	5
1	(Finland) (South Africa)	Juho Paukku; Kevin Anderson	0; 6	4; 6	6^{5} 7^{7}
2	(Finland) (South Africa)	Jarkko Nieminen; Rik de Voest	6; 4	6; 3	7; 5
3	(Finland) (South Africa)	Henri Kontinen / Jarkko Nieminen; Jeff Coetzee / Wesley Moodie	6; 4	1; 6	4; 6	2; 6
4	(Finland) (South Africa)	Jarkko Nieminen; Kevin Anderson	6; 4	3; 6	1; 6	3; 6
5	(Finland) (South Africa)	Henri Kontinen; Rik de Voest	6; 4	4; 6	3; 6

=== Algeria vs. Hungary ===
Algeria
3
Office du Complexe Olympique Mohamed Boudiaf Tennis Club, Algiers, Algeria
11–13 April 2008
clay (outdoors)

Hungary
2

			1	2	3	4	5
1	(Algeria) (Hungary)	Slimane Saoudi; Kornél Bardóczky	1; 6	4; 6	3; 6
2	(Algeria) (Hungary)	Lamine Ouahab; Sebő Kiss	1; 6	4; 6	6; 4	6; 1	7; 5
3	(Algeria) (Hungary)	Lamine Ouahab / Slimane Saoudi; Kornél Bardóczky / Róbert Varga	4; 6	3; 6	5; 7
4	(Algeria) (Hungary)	Lamine Ouahab; Kornél Bardóczky	6; 1	4; 6	3; 6	6; 3	6; 2
5	(Algeria) (Hungary)	Slimane Saoudi; Sebő Kiss	7^{7} 6^{4}	4; 6	6; 0	6; 3

=== Monaco vs. Greece ===
Monaco
3
Monte Carlo Country Club, Roquebrune Cap Martin, France
11–13 April 2008
clay (outdoors)

Greece
2

			1	2	3	4	5
1	(Monaco) (Greece)	Jean-René Lisnard; Alexandros Jakupovic	6; 3	6; 1	6; 1
2	(Monaco) (Greece)	Benjamin Balleret; Konstantinos Economidis	6; 3	3; 6	6^{1} 7^{7}	5; 7
3	(Monaco) (Greece)	Guillaume Couillard / Jean-René Lisnard; Konstantinos Economidis / Alexandros Jakupovic	3; 6	5; 7	3; 6
4	(Monaco) (Greece)	Jean-René Lisnard; Konstantinos Economidis	2; 6	4; 6	7^{7} 6^{4}	6; 0	6; 0
5	(Monaco) (Greece)	Benjamin Balleret; Alexandros Jakupovic	6; 3	6; 1	7; 5

=== Ukraine vs. Egypt ===
Ukraine
5
Selena Tennis Club, Cherkasy, Ukraine
11–13 April 2008
hard (indoors)

Egypt
0

			1	2	3	4	5
1	(Ukraine) (Egypt)	Sergiy Stakhovsky; Karim Maamoun	6; 1	6; 3	6; 1
2	(Ukraine) (Egypt)	Sergey Bubka; Sherif Sabry	6; 1	7^{7} 6^{4}	2; 6	6; 0
3	(Ukraine) (Egypt)	Sergey Bubka / Sergiy Stakhovsky; Karim Maamoun / Sherif Sabry	6^{4} 7^{7}	6; 1	6; 4	6; 2
4	(Ukraine) (Egypt)	Artem Smirnov; Sherif Sabry	6; 3	6; 3
5	(Ukraine) (Egypt)	Ivan Sergeyev; Mahmoud Ezz	6; 3	6; 4

=== Ireland vs. Morocco ===
Ireland
3
Fitzwilliam Lawn Tennis Club, Dublin, Ireland
11–13 April 2008
carpet (indoors)

Morocco
2

			1	2	3	4	5
1	(Republic of Ireland) (Morocco)	Louk Sorensen; Mounir El Aarej	6; 3	2; 6	6; 4	6; 2
2	(Republic of Ireland) (Morocco)	Conor Niland; Younes El Aynaoui	4; 6	4; 6	2; 6
3	(Republic of Ireland) (Morocco)	James Cluskey / Colin O'Brien; Rabie Chaki / Reda El Amrani	6; 1	5; 7	6; 2	6^{4} 7^{7}	4; 6
4	(Republic of Ireland) (Morocco)	Louk Sorensen; Younes El Aynaoui	3; 6	6; 4	7^{7} 6^{5}	6; 4
5	(Republic of Ireland) (Morocco)	Conor Niland; Mounir El Aarej	7^{7} 6^{4}	1; 6	6^{6} 7^{8}	6; 3	6; 0

=== Cyprus vs. Slovenia ===
Cyprus
3
National Tennis Center, Nicosia, Cyprus
11–13 April 2008
hard (outdoors)

Slovenia
2

			1	2	3	4	5
1	(Cyprus) (Slovenia)	Photos Kallias; Marko Tkalec	3; 6	3; 6	1; 6
2	(Cyprus) (Slovenia)	Marcos Baghdatis; Blaž Kavčič	6; 4	6; 3	6; 4
3	(Cyprus) (Slovenia)	Marcos Baghdatis / Photos Kallias; Luka Gregorc / Grega Žemlja	7^{7} 6^{4}	4; 6	6; 2	4; 6	6; 1
4	(Cyprus) (Slovenia)	Marcos Baghdatis; Marko Tkalec	6; 4	6; 4	6; 4
5	(Cyprus) (Slovenia)	Photos Kallias; Blaž Kavčič	1; 6	1; 6

=== Portugal vs. Tunisia ===
Portugal
4
Clube de Tenis do Estoril, Estoril, Portugal
11–13 April 2008
clay (outdoors)

Tunisia
1

			1	2	3	4	5
1	(Portugal) (Tunisia)	Rui Machado; Walid Jallali	6; 1	6; 1	7; 5
2	(Portugal) (Tunisia)	Frederico Gil; Malek Jaziri	6; 3	6; 4	6; 3
3	(Portugal) (Tunisia)	Gastão Elias / Leonardo Tavares; Walid Jallali / Malek Jaziri	6; 3	6; 3	6; 3
4	(Portugal) (Tunisia)	Gastão Elias; Walid Jallali	5; 7	2; 6
5	(Portugal) (Tunisia)	Leonardo Tavares; Slah Mbarek	6; 2	6; 4

== Play-offs ==
=== Finland vs. Luxembourg ===
Finland
3
Hanko Tennis Stadion, Hanko, Finland
18–20 July 2008
Clay

Luxembourg
2

			1	2	3	4	5
1	(Finland) (Luxembourg)	Timo Nieminen; Gilles Müller	1; 6	4; 6	2; 6
2	(Finland) (Luxembourg)	Jarkko Nieminen; Philippe Grandjean	6; 0	6; 1	6; 0
3	(Finland) (Luxembourg)	Henri Kontinen / Jarkko Nieminen; Laurent Bram / Gilles Müller	6; 2	7^{9} 6^{7}	7^{7} 6^{4}
4	(Finland) (Luxembourg)	Harri Heliövaara; Gilles Müller	4; 6	5; 7	1; 6
5	(Finland) (Luxembourg)	Henri Kontinen; Laurent Bram	6; 1	6; 3	6; 3

=== Greece vs. Hungary ===
Greece
0
Thessaloniki Tennis Club, Thessaloniki, Greece
18–20 July 2008
Clay

Hungary
5

			1	2	3	4	5
1	(Greece) (Hungary)	Konstantinos Mikos; Sebő Kiss	1; 6	3; 6	0; 6
2	(Greece) (Hungary)	Charalampos Kapogiannis; Kornél Bardóczky	2; 6	2; 6	4; 6
3	(Greece) (Hungary)	Charalampos Kapogiannis / Konstantinos Mikos; Kornél Bardóczky / Róbert Varga	1; 6	1; 6	1; 6
4	(Greece) (Hungary)	Konstantinos Mikos; Dénes Lukács	1; 6	2; 6
5	(Greece) (Hungary)	Charalampos Kapogiannis; Sebő Kiss	1; 6	2; 6

=== Egypt vs. Morocco ===
Egypt
3
Heliopolis Sporting Club, Cairo, Egypt
18–20 July 2008
Clay

Morocco
2

			1	2	3	4	5
1	(Egypt) (Morocco)	Sherif Sabry; Talal Ouahabi	2; 6	6^{2} 7^{7}	3; 2			retired
2	(Egypt) (Morocco)	Karim Maamoun; Reda El Amrani	2; 6	2; 6	7^{11} 6^{9}	6; 4	6; 4
3	(Egypt) (Morocco)	Karim Maamoun / Sherif Sabry; Reda El Amrani / Mehdi Ziadi	6^{7} 7^{9}	7; 5	4; 6	5; 7
4	(Egypt) (Morocco)	Mohamed Mamoun; Reda El Amrani	4; 6	2; 6	4; 6
5	(Egypt) (Morocco)	Karim Maamoun; Mehdi Ziadi	6; 4	7^{7} 6^{1}	6; 3

=== Tunisia vs. Slovenia ===
Tunisia
1
Tennis Club de Tunis, Tunis, Tunisia
18–20 July 2008
Clay

Slovenia
4

			1	2	3	4	5
1	(Tunisia) (Slovenia)	Malek Jaziri; Grega Žemlja	6; 3	1; 6	6; 4	3; 6	4; 6
2	(Tunisia) (Slovenia)	Walid Jallali; Marko Tkalec	3; 6	1; 6	2; 6
3	(Tunisia) (Slovenia)	Haythem Abid / Malek Jaziri; Marko Tkalec / Grega Žemlja	3; 6	7; 5	7^{7} 6^{5}	7; 5
4	(Tunisia) (Slovenia)	Haythem Abid; Blaž Kavčič	3; 6	6; 3	6; 3	5; 7	2; 6
5	(Tunisia) (Slovenia)	Anis Ghorbel; Janez Semrajc	3; 6	3; 6

== Second round matches ==
=== South Africa vs. Denmark ===
South Africa
5
Emperors Palace, Johannesburg, South Africa
18–20 July 2008
Hard

Denmark
0

			1	2	3	4	5
1	(South Africa) (Denmark)	Kevin Anderson; Martin Pedersen	7^{7} 6^{5}	7; 5	6; 2
2	(South Africa) (Denmark)	Rik de Voest; Frederik Nielsen	6; 3	6; 2	6; 2
3	(South Africa) (Denmark)	Jeff Coetzee / Rik de Voest; Frederik Nielsen / Rasmus Nørby	7^{7} 6^{3}	7; 5	4; 6	7; 5
4	(South Africa) (Denmark)	Kevin Anderson; Thomas Kromann	6; 1	6; 3
5	(South Africa) (Denmark)	Izak van der Merwe; Martin Pedersen	7^{12} 6^{10}	6; 4

=== Monaco vs. Algeria ===
Monaco
5
Monte Carlo Country Club, Roquebrune-Cap-Martin, France
18–20 July 2008
Clay

Algeria
0

			1	2	3	4	5
1	(Monaco) (Algeria)	Jean-René Lisnard; Ouassel Hared	7^{15} 6^{13}	6; 3	6; 1
2	(Monaco) (Algeria)	Benjamin Balleret; Slimane Saoudi	3; 6	6; 3	6; 2	6; 4
3	(Monaco) (Algeria)	Guillaume Couillard / Jean-René Lisnard; Abdelhak Hameurlaine / Slimane Saoudi	6; 3	6; 2	6; 4
4	(Monaco) (Algeria)	Clément Morel; Slimane Saoudi	6; 4	6; 1
5	(Monaco) (Algeria)	Benjamin Balleret; Abdelhak Hameurlaine	6; 2	6; 4

=== Ireland vs. Ukraine ===
Ireland
2
Fitzwilliam Lawn Tennis Club, Dublin, Ireland
18–20 July 2008
Grass

Ukraine
3

			1	2	3	4	5
1	(Republic of Ireland) (Ukraine)	Conor Niland; Artem Smirnov	6; 1	6; 2	6; 2
2	(Republic of Ireland) (Ukraine)	Colin O'Brien; Sergiy Stakhovsky	3; 6	3; 6	1; 6
3	(Republic of Ireland) (Ukraine)	James Cluskey / Eoin Heavey; Sergey Bubka / Sergiy Stakhovsky	3; 6	6^{6} 7^{8}	4; 6
4	(Republic of Ireland) (Ukraine)	Conor Niland; Sergiy Stakhovsky	6; 4	6; 4	4; 6	6^{7} 7^{9}	5; 7
5	(Republic of Ireland) (Ukraine)	Colin O'Brien; Artem Smirnov	6; 2	6; 2

=== Portugal vs. Cyprus ===
Portugal
5
Lawn Tennis Club da Foz, Porto, Portugal
18–20 July 2008
Clay

Cyprus
0

			1	2	3	4	5
1	(Portugal) (Cyprus)	Frederico Gil; George Kallis	6; 1	6; 1	6; 0
2	(Portugal) (Cyprus)	Rui Machado; Photos Kallias	6; 4	6; 4	7; 5
3	(Portugal) (Cyprus)	Frederico Gil / Leonardo Tavares; Photos Kallias / Demetrios Leontis	6; 2	6; 1	5; 7	6; 3
4	(Portugal) (Cyprus)	Frederico Gil; Photos Kallias	6; 3	6; 2
5	(Portugal) (Cyprus)	João Sousa; Eleftherios Christou	6; 3	6; 3

== Third round matches ==
=== Monaco vs. South Africa ===
Monaco
2
Monte Carlo Country Club, Roquebrune-Cap-Martin, France
19–21 September 2008
Clay

South Africa
3

			1	2	3	4	5
1	(Monaco) (South Africa)	Benjamin Balleret; Kevin Anderson	7^{9} 6^{7}	2; 6	6; 2	3; 6	0; 6
2	(Monaco) (South Africa)	Jean-René Lisnard; Rik de Voest	6; 4	4; 6	5; 7	6^{4} 7^{7}
3	(Monaco) (South Africa)	Guillaume Couillard / Jean-René Lisnard; Jeff Coetzee / Izak van der Merwe	6; 2	3; 6	6; 4	6; 4
4	(Monaco) (South Africa)	Jean-René Lisnard; Kevin Anderson	6; 3	6; 4	7^{7} 6^{2}
5	(Monaco) (South Africa)	Benjamin Balleret; Rik de Voest	5; 7	2; 6	1; 6

=== Ukraine vs. Portugal ===
Ukraine
5
Megaron Tennis Club, Dnipropetrovsk, Ukraine
19–21 September 2008
Hard (indoor)

Portugal
0

			1	2	3	4	5
1	(Ukraine) (Portugal)	Sergiy Stakhovsky; Gastão Elias	6; 4	7^{7} 6^{5}	6; 4
2	(Ukraine) (Portugal)	Sergey Bubka; Rui Machado	6; 3	3; 6	7^{7} 6^{4}	6; 4
3	(Ukraine) (Portugal)	Sergey Bubka / Sergiy Stakhovsky; Gastão Elias / Leonardo Tavares	6; 3	6; 2	6; 4
4	(Ukraine) (Portugal)	Illya Marchenko; João Sousa	6; 3	6; 3
5	(Ukraine) (Portugal)	Ivan Sergeyev; Leonardo Tavares	7^{8} 6^{6}	4; 6	6; 3
