= 1997 Davis Cup Europe/Africa Zone Group I =

International tennis competition

The Europe/Africa Zone was one of the three zones of the regional Davis Cup competition in 1997.

In the Europe/Africa Zone there were four different tiers, called groups, in which teams competed against each other to advance to the upper tier. Winners in Group I advanced to the World Group qualifying round, along with losing teams from the World Group first round. Teams who lost in the first round competed in the relegation play-offs, with winning teams remaining in Group I, whereas teams who lost their play-offs were relegated to the Europe/Africa Zone Group II in 1998.

== Participating nations ==
- Austria
- Belgium
- Croatia
- Denmark
- Great Britain
- Hungary
- Israel
- Morocco
- Slovakia
- Ukraine
- Zimbabwe

=== Draw ===
Second Round Play-offs
Budapest, Hungary (clay)
Hungary	2
Ukraine	3
Israel	w/o
Morocco

First Round Play-offs
bye
Hungary
Kyiv, Ukraine (clay)
Great Britain	3
Ukraine	2
Israel
bye
Morocco
bye

First Round
Belgium
bye
Aalborg, Denmark (indoor carpet)
Denmark	5
Hungary	0
Great Britain
bye
Harare, Zimbabwe (indoor hard)
Ukraine	0
Zimbabwe	5
Israel
bye
bye
Slovakia
Osijek, Croatia (indoor carpet)
Morocco	1
Croatia	4
bye
Austria

Second Round
Brussels, Belgium (clay)
Belgium	3
Denmark	2
London, England (indoor carpet)
Great Britain	1
Zimbabwe	4
Bratislava, Slovakia (clay)
Israel	1
Slovakia	3
Graz, Austria (indoor clay)
Croatia	2
Austria	3

- Hungary and Morocco relegated to Group II in 1998.
- Belgium, Zimbabwe, Slovakia, and Austria advance to World Group qualifying round.

== First round ==
=== Denmark vs. Hungary ===
Denmark
5
Aalborg Stadium, Aalborg, Denmark
7–9 February 1997
Carpet (indoors)

Hungary
0

			1	2	3	4	5
1	(Denmark) (Hungary)	Frederik Fetterlein; József Krocskó	6; 4	6; 2	7; 5
2	(Denmark) (Hungary)	Kenneth Carlsen; Attila Sávolt	6; 4	6; 4	7^{7} 6^{3}
3	(Denmark) (Hungary)	Kenneth Carlsen / Frederik Fetterlein; László Markovits / Attila Sávolt	7^{7} 6^{4}	7^{7} 6^{2}	6; 4
4	(Denmark) (Hungary)	Kenneth Carlsen; József Krocskó	6; 3	6^{5} 7^{7}	6; 3
5	(Denmark) (Hungary)	Frederik Fetterlein; Attila Sávolt	5; 7	6; 3	6; 4

=== Zimbabwe vs. Ukraine ===
Zimbabwe
5
City Sports Centre, Harare, Zimbabwe
7–9 February 1997
Hard (indoors)

Ukraine
0

			1	2	3	4	5
1	(Zimbabwe) (Ukraine)	Wayne Black; Andriy Medvedev	6; 4	6; 3	4; 6	6; 4
2	(Zimbabwe) (Ukraine)	Byron Black; Andrei Rybalko	5; 7	6; 2	7^{7} 6^{2}	6; 3
3	(Zimbabwe) (Ukraine)	Byron Black / Wayne Black; Andriy Medvedev / Dimitri Poliakov	6^{8} 7^{10}	7; 5	4; 6	6; 1	6; 4
4	(Zimbabwe) (Ukraine)	Byron Black; Denis Yakimenko	6; 4	6; 4
5	(Zimbabwe) (Ukraine)	Wayne Black; Andrei Rybalko	7^{7} 6^{3}	6; 3

=== Croatia vs. Morocco ===
Croatia
4
Zrinjevac Sport Hall, Osijek, Croatia
7–9 February 1997
Carpet (indoors)

Morocco
1

			1	2	3	4	5
1	(Croatia) (Morocco)	Saša Hiršzon; Karim Alami	6; 4	6; 1	6; 3
2	(Croatia) (Morocco)	Goran Ivanišević; Hicham Arazi	6; 2	6; 2	6^{4} 7^{7}	6; 2
3	(Croatia) (Morocco)	Saša Hiršzon / Goran Ivanišević; Karim Alami / Hicham Arazi	6; 2	6; 3	6; 3
4	(Croatia) (Morocco)	Goran Ivanišević; Karim Alami	6; 2	7; 5
5	(Croatia) (Morocco)	Saša Hiršzon; Hicham Arazi	1; 6	4; 6

== Second round ==
=== Belgium vs. Denmark ===
Belgium
3
Royal Léopold Club, Brussels, Belgium
4–6 April 1997
Clay

Denmark
2

			1	2	3	4	5
1	(Belgium) (Denmark)	Filip Dewulf; Kenneth Carlsen	6; 4	6; 0	6; 1
2	(Belgium) (Denmark)	Johan Van Herck; Frederik Fetterlein	6^{5} 7^{7}	6; 2	2; 6	1; 6
3	(Belgium) (Denmark)	Filip Dewulf / Libor Pimek; Kenneth Carlsen / Frederik Fetterlein	3; 6	5; 7	6; 1	4; 6
4	(Belgium) (Denmark)	Johan Van Herck; Kenneth Carlsen	6; 4	6; 1	7; 5
5	(Belgium) (Denmark)	Filip Dewulf; Frederik Fetterlein	6; 0	6; 4	3; 6	2; 6	6; 1

=== Great Britain vs. Zimbabwe ===
Great Britain
1
Crystal Palace National Sports Centre, London, England
4–6 April 1997
Carpet (indoors)

Zimbabwe
4

			1	2	3	4	5
1	(United Kingdom) (Zimbabwe)	Jamie Delgado; Wayne Black	6; 2	3; 6	1; 6	3; 6
2	(United Kingdom) (Zimbabwe)	Andrew Richardson; Byron Black	3; 6	6; 4	1; 6	6; 4	6; 4
3	(United Kingdom) (Zimbabwe)	Neil Broad / Mark Petchey; Byron Black / Wayne Black	6; 3	1; 6	4; 6	7^{8} 6^{6}	3; 6
4	(United Kingdom) (Zimbabwe)	Jamie Delgado; Byron Black	0; 6	0; 6	2; 6
5	(United Kingdom) (Zimbabwe)	Andrew Richardson; Wayne Black	3; 6	7^{7} 6^{5}	6^{2} 7^{7}

=== Slovakia vs. Israel ===
Slovakia
3
Slovan Kerametal Tennis Club, Bratislava, Slovakia
4–6 April 1997
Clay

Israel
1

			1	2	3	4	5
1	(Slovakia) (Israel)	Dominik Hrbatý; Eyal Ran	6; 3	4; 6	6; 3	6; 4
2	(Slovakia) (Israel)	Karol Kučera; Noam Behr	6; 1	6; 3	6; 0
3	(Slovakia) (Israel)	Dominik Hrbatý / Karol Kučera; Noam Behr / Eyal Erlich	4; 6	6; 3	3; 6	6^{4} 7^{7}
4	(Slovakia) (Israel)	Karol Kučera; Eyal Ran	6; 2	6; 3	6; 2
5	(Slovakia) (Israel)	Dominik Hrbatý; Noam Behr						not played

=== Austria vs. Croatia ===
Austria
3
Liebenauer Stadium, Graz, Austria
4–6 April 1997
Clay (indoors)

Croatia
2

			1	2	3	4	5
1	(Austria) (Croatia)	Gilbert Schaller; Goran Ivanišević	6; 3	6; 4	6^{3} 7^{7}	2; 6	3; 1	retired
2	(Austria) (Croatia)	Thomas Muster; Saša Hiršzon	6; 0	6; 4	3; 6	6; 1
3	(Austria) (Croatia)	Thomas Muster / Udo Plamberger; Saša Hiršzon / Goran Ivanišević	5; 7	2; 6	2; 6
4	(Austria) (Croatia)	Thomas Muster; Goran Ivanišević	7^{7} 6^{5}	5; 7	7^{7} 6^{5}	2; 6	5; 7
5	(Austria) (Croatia)	Gilbert Schaller; Saša Hiršzon	6; 3	6; 3	7; 5

== First round relegation play-offs ==
=== Ukraine vs. Great Britain ===
Ukraine
2
Nauka Sports Club, Kyiv, Ukraine
11–13 July 1997
Clay

Great Britain
3

			1	2	3	4	5
1	(Ukraine) (United Kingdom)	Andrei Rybalko; Tim Henman	6; 3	4; 6	3; 6	6; 4	4; 6
2	(Ukraine) (United Kingdom)	Andriy Medvedev; Greg Rusedski	6; 1	6; 1	2; 6	6; 2
3	(Ukraine) (United Kingdom)	Andriy Medvedev / Dimitri Poliakov; Tim Henman / Greg Rusedski	1; 6	4; 6	6^{5} 7^{7}
4	(Ukraine) (United Kingdom)	Andriy Medvedev; Tim Henman	6^{5} 7^{7}	6; 3	6; 4	6; 4
5	(Ukraine) (United Kingdom)	Andrei Rybalko; Greg Rusedski	5; 7	3; 6	3; 6

== Second round relegation play-offs ==
=== Hungary vs. Ukraine ===
Hungary
2
Római Tennis Academy, Budapest, Hungary
19–21 September 1997
Clay

Ukraine
3

			1	2	3	4	5
1	(Hungary) (Ukraine)	Kornél Bardóczky; Andriy Medvedev	2; 6	2; 6	2; 6
2	(Hungary) (Ukraine)	Attila Sávolt; Andrei Rybalko	6; 4	6; 2	2; 6	6; 2
3	(Hungary) (Ukraine)	Gergely Kisgyörgy / Attila Sávolt; Andriy Medvedev / Dimitri Poliakov	2; 6	3; 6	1; 6
4	(Hungary) (Ukraine)	Attila Sávolt; Andriy Medvedev	1; 6	7^{7} 6^{1}	3; 6	7; 5	2; 6
5	(Hungary) (Ukraine)	Kornél Bardóczky; Andrei Rybalko	6; 0	6; 4
