= Ičići =

- Location within Croatia
- Coordinates: 45°18′N 14°17′E
- Country: Croatia
- County: Primorje-Gorski Kotar
- Town: Opatija

Area
  - Total: 1.3 km^{2} (0.50 sq mi)

Population (2021)
  - Total: 836
  - Density: 640/km^{2} (1,700/sq mi)
- Time zone: UTC+1 (CET)
  - Summer (DST): UTC+2 (CEST)

Ičići (Italian: Icici) is a settlement located in Croatia in the north-east part of Istria County. It is located at the foot of the mountain Učka, on the north part of the Adriatic Sea. It has been part of the Opatija municipality since 2006.

== Tourism ==
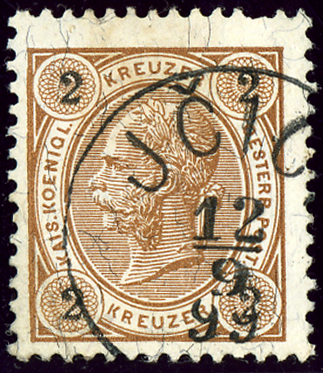
An Austrian administration post-office was opened at JČICI in 1892

The village, which has around 800 regular residents, is known as a tourist resort. It is situated on the Opatija Riviera, and is in close proximity to Opatija.

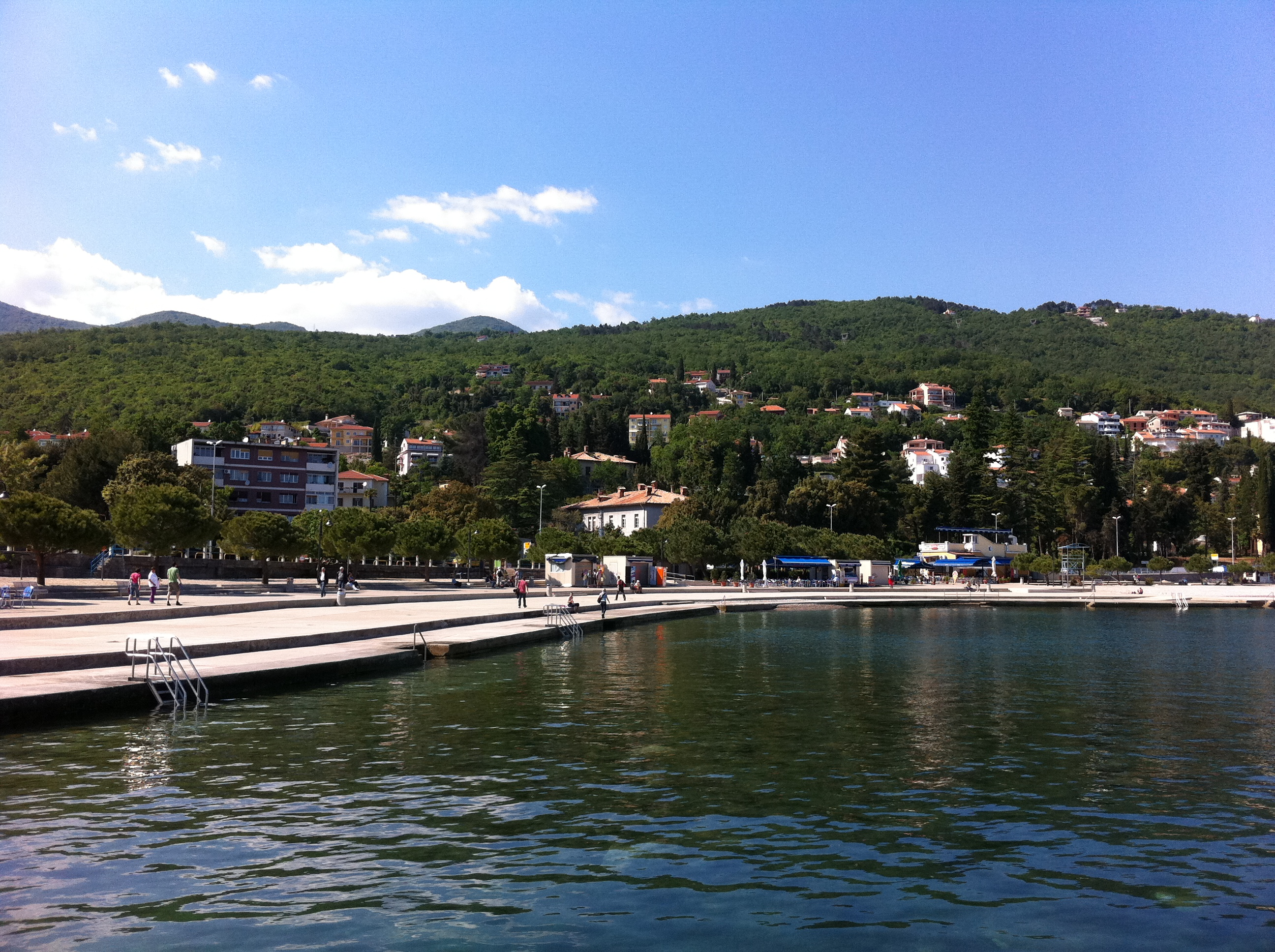
Icici during spring

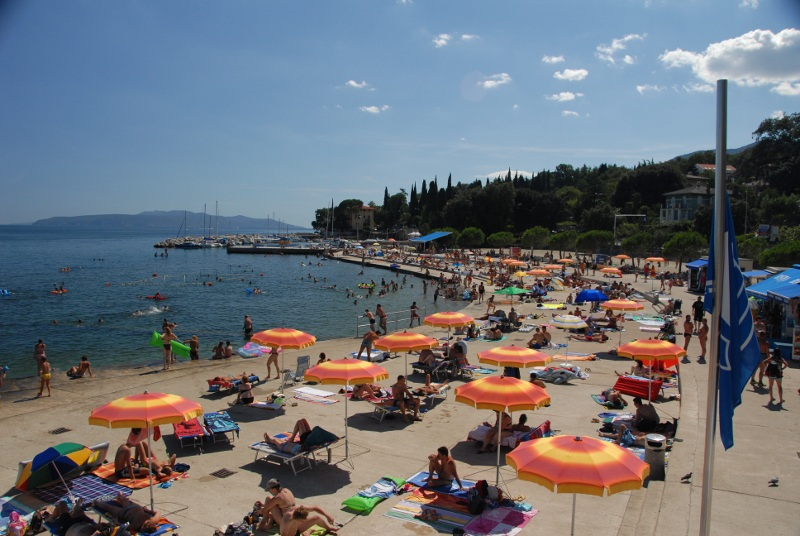
Beach of Icici

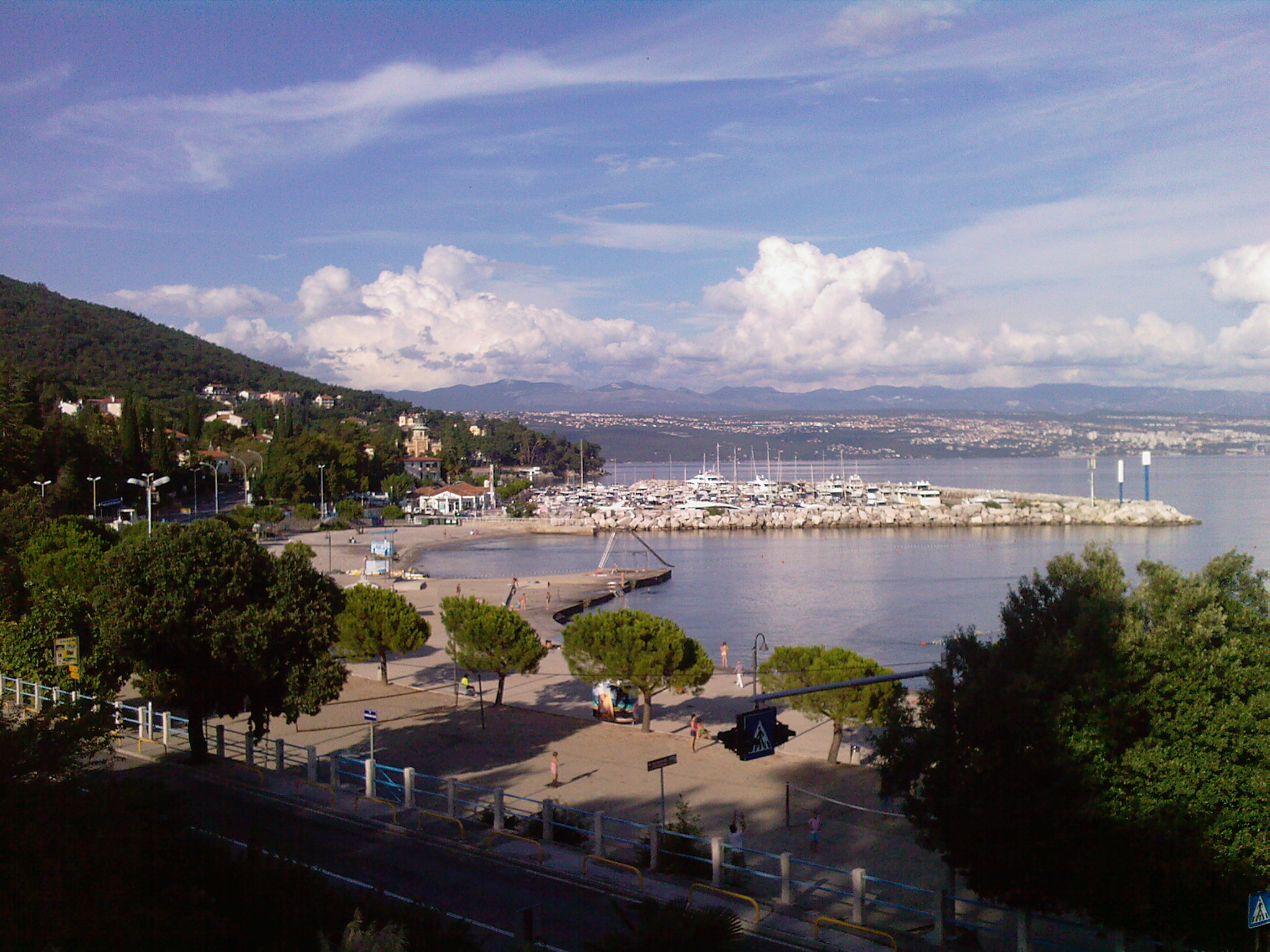
Icici after the rain
