= Agdal (Rabat) =

Urban community in Rabat, Morocco

Coordinates: 33°59′37.08″N 6°50′56.66″W

Rabat Agdal Railway Station

Agdal is an urban community in Rabat, the capital of Morocco. It is a former suburb whose chief inhabitants, prior to the post-war expansion of the city, were the students of the nearby university (as noted by Malika Oufkir in her book Stolen Lives). Presently, it is among the richest neighbourhoods in Morocco. It is inhabited by many expatriates, chiefly French, as well as a population of wealthy Moroccans. It houses one of the two railway stations of Rabat, named Rabat-Agdal.

== See also ==
- Agdal Gardens
