= Marco Mirnegg =

Austrian tennis player

- Full name: Marco Mirnegg
- Country (sports): Austria
- Born: 24 June 1982 (age 42); Linz, Austria
- Plays: Right-handed
- Prize money: $83,350

Singles
- Career record: 0–2
- Career titles: 0
- Highest ranking: No. 204 (26 September 2005)

Doubles
- Career record: 0–1
- Career titles: 0
- Highest ranking: No. 498 (4 October 2004)

Marco Mirnegg (born 24 June 1982) is a former professional tennis player from Austria.

== Biography ==
Born in Linz, he is the son of former Austrian football international Dieter Mirnegg.

Mirnegg, who was coached by Jürgen Waber, turned professional in 2002. He won three Challenger titles and in satellite tournaments had wins over Nicolás Almagro and Roberto Bautista Agut. His only main draw appearance on the ATP Tour came at St. Pölten in 2005, where he featured in both the singles and doubles competitions. He played a Davis Cup match for Austria in 2005, against Australia in Sydney. In the reverse singles, with the tie lost, Mirnegg was called up to face Todd Woodbridge and lost a close match to the Australian doubles specialist 5–7 in the final set.

== Challenger titles ==
=== Singles: (3) ===
No.	Year	Tournament	Surface	Opponent	Score
1.	2005	Seville, Spain	Clay	(Brazil) Marcos Daniel	6–3, 3–0 (RET)
2.	2006	Banja Luka, Bosnia & Herzegovina	Clay	(France) Nicolas Devilder	6–2, 6–4
3.	2007	Ljubljana, Slovenia	Clay	(France) Mathieu Montcourt	7–6^{(5)}, 7–5

== See also ==
- List of Austria Davis Cup team representatives
