= Tamás György =

Hungarian tennis player

- Country (sports): Hungary
- Born: 7 September 1971 (age 54)
- Prize money: $11,038

Singles
- Highest ranking: No. 664 (15 Sep 1997)

Grand Slam singles results
- Australian Open: Q1 (1997)

Doubles
- Highest ranking: No. 441 (14 Aug 1995)

Tamás György (born 7 September 1971) is a Hungarian former professional tennis player.

György competed as high up as ATP Challenger level and won a doubles tournament in Budapest in 1994, partnering Emanuel Couto. He had a career best singles ranking of 664 in the world and featured in the qualifying draw for the 1997 Australian Open. His elder brother, Károly, was a professional tennis player active in the 1990s.

== ATP Challenger titles ==
=== Doubles: (1) ===
No.	Date	Tournament	Surface	Partner	Opponents	Score
1.	Sep 1994	Budapest II Challenger; Budapest, Hungary	Clay	(Portugal) Emanuel Couto	(United States) Jeff Belloli (North Macedonia) Aleksandar Kitinov	6–2, 7–5
