= Michał Chmela =

Polish tennis player

- Country (sports): Poland
- Born: 21 May 1977 (age 48)
- Plays: Right-handed
- Prize money: $20,425

Singles
- Career titles: 1 (ATP Challenger)
- Highest ranking: No. 341 (9 November 1998)

Doubles
- Highest ranking: No. 591 (26 April 1999)

Michał Chmela (born 21 May 1977) is a Polish former professional tennis player.

A right-handed player, Chmela competed on the professional tour during the late 1990s. He had a win over Marat Safin at an ATP Challenger tournament in Poznań in 1997 and the following year won his only Challenger title, at Sopot. His career best singles ranking was 341 in the world.

Between 1996 and 1999 he appeared in eight ties for the Poland Davis Cup team.

Chmela played college tennis in the United States for Louisiana State University. He was a two-time All-American in both singles and doubles.

== Challenger titles ==
=== Singles: (1) ===
Year	Tournament	Surface	Opponent	Score
1998	Sopot, Poland	Clay	(Denmark) Thomas Larsen	6–2, 7–6

== See also ==
- List of Poland Davis Cup team representatives
