= Zoltán Böröczky =

Hungarian tennis player (born 1979)

- Country (sports): Hungary
- Born: 16 May 1979 (age 47) Budapest, Hungary
- Prize money: $11,208

Singles
- Career record: 0–1 (Davis Cup)
- Highest ranking: No. 721 (1 Nov 1999)

Doubles
- Career record: 1–0 (Davis Cup)
- Highest ranking: No. 455 (19 Mar 2001)

Zoltán Böröczky (born 16 May 1979) is a Hungarian former professional tennis player.

Born in Budapest, Böröczky was a member of the Hungary Davis Cup team for their 1999 campaign, featuring in ties against Bulgaria and Denmark. He registered a doubles win (with Attila Sávolt) over Bulgaria's doubles pairing and was beaten in his only singles rubber, by Denmark's Thomas Larsen.

== ITF Futures finals ==
=== Doubles: 3 (1–2) ===
Result	W–L	Date	Tournament	Surface	Partner	Opponents	Score
Loss	0–1	Jun 1999	Hungary F2, Budapest	Clay	(Hungary) Balázs Váci	(France) Maxime Boyé (France) Olivier Malcor	2–6, 1–6
Win	1–1	Jun 2000	Macedonia F1, Skopje	Clay	(Federal Republic of Yugoslavia) Relja Dulić Fišer	(Croatia) Ivan Cinkuš (Russia) Sergei Pozdnev	6–7^{(4)}, 6–4, 7–5
Loss	1–2	Jul 2003	Romania F3, Iași	Clay	(Sweden) Michael Ryderstedt	(Romania) Ionuț Moldovan (Romania) Gabriel Moraru	2–6, 2–6

== See also ==
- List of Hungary Davis Cup team representatives
