= Iztok Božič =

Slovenian tennis player (born 1971)

- Full name: Iztok Božič
- Country (sports): Yugoslavia; Slovenia
- Born: 27 September 1971 (age 55) Maribor, SR Slovenia, Yugoslavia
- Plays: Right-handed
- Prize money: $81,097

Singles
- Career record: 4–7
- Career titles: 0
- Highest ranking: No. 197 (3 August 1998)

Doubles
- Career record: 0–1
- Career titles: 0
- Highest ranking: No. 345 (28 February 2000)
Medal record
Men's tennis
Representing Slovenia
Mediterranean Games
Silver medal – second place	1997 Bari	Men's doubles

Iztok Božič (born 27 September 1971) is a former professional tennis player from Slovenia. He is also a former captain of the Slovenia Fed Cup team.

== Biography ==
=== Early years ===
Božič, who was born in Maribor, began playing tennis at the age of seven.

As a junior, he reached the round of 16 at the 1989 Australian Open, and also partnered with Patrick Rafter in the boys' doubles.

=== ATP career ===
In the early 1990s, he began competing professionally and is notable for being the first Slovenian player to be ranked in the world's top 200.

He was the runner-up at the Kosice Challenger in 1994 and appeared twice in the main draw of ATP Tour tournaments, both times as a qualifier. At the 1995 ATP St. Pölten, he took third seed Gilbert Schaller to three sets in the first round and also lost in the opening round of the Croatia Open in 2001, in three sets to Óscar Serrano.

In 1998, he made it to the final round of qualifying at three of the four Grand Slam tournaments: the Australian Open, French Open and US Open.

=== Representative ===
At the 1992 Summer Olympics, Božič was a member of Slovenia's first-ever Olympic squad as an independent nation and participated in the men's doubles competition. He and his partner, Blaž Trupej, were defeated in the opening round by the Indian pairing of Leander Paes and Ramesh Krishnan.

Božič played a total of 15 Davis Cup ties for Slovenia during his career, with his debut in 1994 against Greece in Slovenia's first-ever home fixture. By the time he retired, he had amassed a 14/14 record, with all victories coming in singles.

He won a silver medal for Slovenia at the 1997 Mediterranean Games, in the men's doubles with Borut Urh.
