= Gergely Kisgyörgy =

Hungarian tennis player

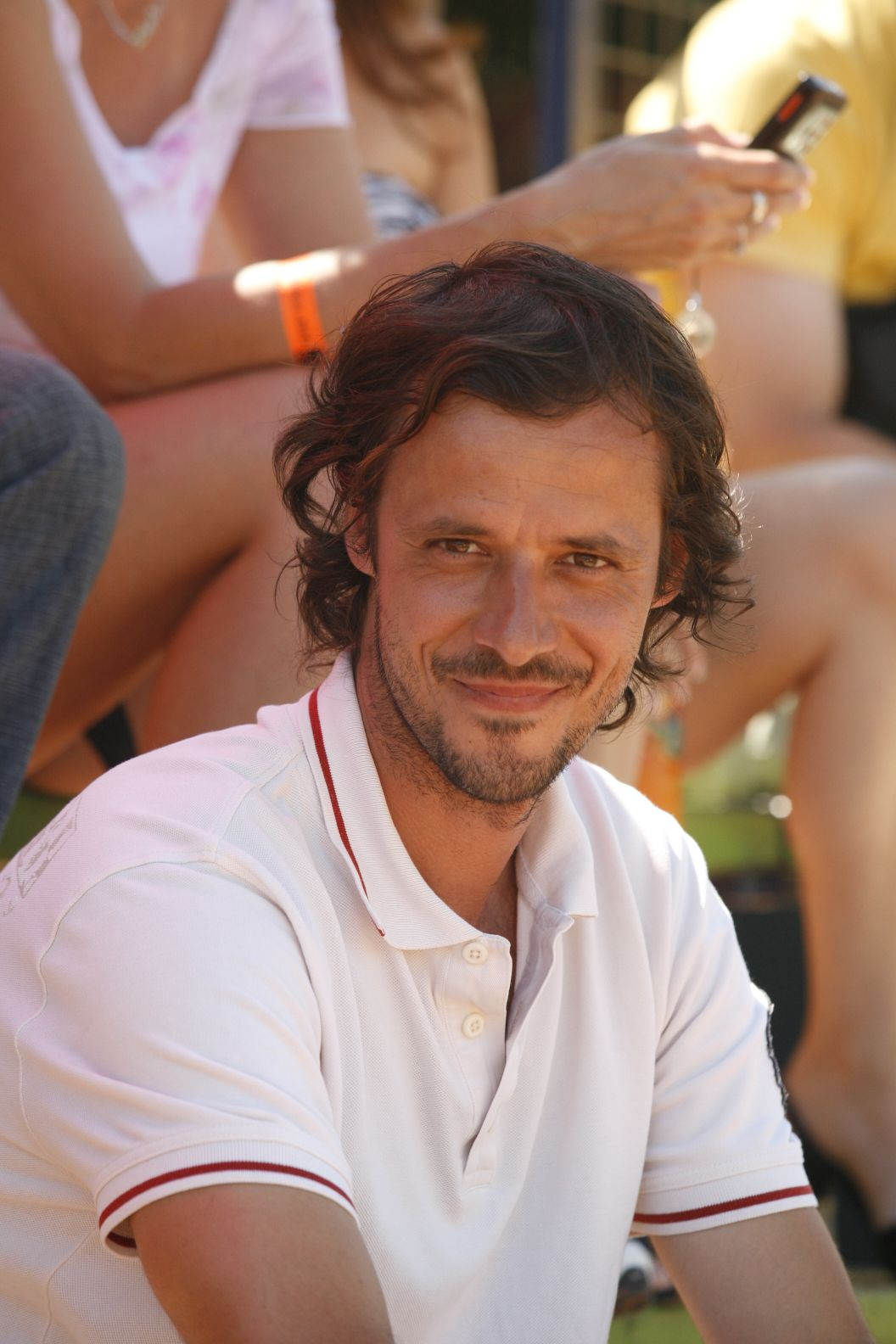
- Kisgyörgy in 2010
- Country (sports): Hungary
- Born: 8 March 1976 (age 49)
- Plays: Right-handed
- Prize money: $85,303

Singles
- Career record: 11–8
- Career titles: 0
- Highest ranking: No. 301 (19 Jun 2000)

Doubles
- Career record: 7–7
- Career titles: 0
- Highest ranking: No. 109 (16 Feb 2004)

Grand Slam doubles results
- Wimbledon: 2R (2004)

Gergely Kisgyörgy (born 8 March 1976) is a former professional tennis player from Hungary.

Kisgyörgy was twice the runner-up at the Hungarian Tennis Championships, in 1999 and 2001, but was more successful as a doubles player during his career. He won seven doubles titles on the Challenger circuit and participated in one Grand Slam, the 2004 Wimbledon Championships. With Łukasz Kubot as his partner, the pair defeated South Americans Juan Ignacio Chela and Luis Horna in a close first round encounter, won 9–7 in the third set. They were then eliminated in the second round by Bob and Mike Bryan.

He began playing Davis Cup matches for Hungary in 1997 and went on to appear in a total of 24 ties. In singles he won 16 of his 24 singles rubbers and was the victor in seven out of 13 doubles matches.

== Challenger titles ==
=== Doubles: (7) ===
No.	Year	Tournament	Surface	Partner	Opponents	Score
1.	1999	Skopje, Macedonia	Clay	(Australia) Steven Randjelovic	(Argentina) Federico Browne (Croatia) Lovro Zovko	6–1, 5–7, 7–6^{(8–6)}
2.	2003	Budapest, Hungary	Clay	(Hungary) Kornél Bardóczky	(United States) Thomas Blake (United States) Jason Marshall	7–6^{(7–4)}, 6–0
3.	2003	Ljubljana, Slovenia	Clay	(Italy) Leonardo Azzaro	(Croatia) Ivan Cerović (Serbia) Aleksander Slović	7–6^{(7–3)}, 6–3
4.	2003	Oberstaufen, Germany	Clay	(Hungary) Kornél Bardóczky	(Argentina) Ignacio González King (Brazil) Ricardo Schlachter	4–6, 7–6^{(7–4)}, 6–2
5.	2003	Budaörs, Hungary	Clay	(Italy) Leonardo Azzaro	(Czech Republic) Tomáš Berdych (Czech Republic) Michal Navrátil	6–4, 4–6, 7–6^{(7–3)}
6.	2004	Rome, Italy	Clay	(Hungary) Kornél Bardóczky	(Italy) Daniele Giorgini (Italy) Manuel Jorquera	7–6^{(7–4)}, 4–6, 6–4
7.	2004	Budapest, Hungary	Clay	(Hungary) Kornél Bardóczky	(Italy) Daniele Bracciali (Italy) Manuel Jorquera	6–4, 6–2
