= Marko Tkalec =

Slovenian tennis player

- Country (sports): Slovenia
- Residence: Maribor, Slovenia
- Born: 17 March 1977 (age 48); Maribor, Slovenia back then (Yugoslavia)
- Height: 1.78 m (5 ft 10 in)
- Turned pro: 1997
- Retired: 2009
- Plays: Right-handed
- Coach: Horst Skoff; Bostjan Kuhar
- Prize money: $119,059

Singles
- Career record: 14–9
- Career titles: 0; 0 Challengers, 20 Futures
- Highest ranking: No. 243 (1 April 2002)

Grand Slam singles results
- Australian Open: Q2 (2003)
- Wimbledon: Q2 (2001)

Doubles
- Career record: 2–6
- Career titles: 0
- Highest ranking: No. 357 (28 February 2000)

Marko Tkalec (born 17 March 1977) is a retired professional tennis player from Slovenia. He achieved a career-high singles ranking of World No. 243 in 2002. Tkalec has participated in 22 Davis Cup ties for Slovenia, posting a 25–9 record in singles and a 3–4 record in doubles.

== Futures titles (20) ==
No.	Date	Tournament	Surface	Opponent in the final	Score
1.	1998	Croatia	Clay	(Croatia) Saša Hiršzon	4–1 Ret.
2.	1999	Vilnius, Lithuania	Grass	(Slovenia) Andrej Kračman	7–6^{(2)}, 6–2
3.	2000	Maribor, Slovenia	Clay	(Germany) Frank Pokorny	6–4, 6–0
4.	2000	Kranj, Slovenia	Clay	(Germany) Tobias Clemens	6–4, 6–2
5.	2001	Chalkida, Greece	Hard	(Canada) Philip Gubenco	2–6, 6–1, 6–0
6.	2001	Nafplio, Greece	Hard	(Canada) Jocelyn Robichaud	6–1, 6–4
7.	2001	Syros, Greece	Hard	(Greece) Konstantinos Economidis	6–3, 6–7^{(2)}, 7–6^{(5)}
8.	2001	Nicosia, Cyprus	Clay	(Slovakia) Tomas Janci	7–6^{(3)}, 6–3
9.	2002	Maribor, Slovenia	Clay	(Federal Republic of Yugoslavia) Relja Dulić Fišer	6–3, 5–7, 6–4
10.	2003	Croatia	Carpet	(Greece) Alexander Jakupovic	6–4, 7–6^{(7)}
11.	2006	Maribor, Slovenia	Clay	(Czech Republic) Roman Vögeli	6–3, 7–6^{(6)}
12.	2006	Koper, Slovenia	Clay	(Italy) Manuel Jorquera	4–6, 6–1, 6–2
13.	2006	Austria	Clay	(Austria) Martin Fischer	3–6, 6–3, 6–2
14.	2006	Croatia	Clay	(Croatia) Ivan Cerović	6–4, 6–4
15.	2007	Austria	Carpet	(Czech Republic) Jakub Hasek	6–3, 6–4
16.	2007	Croatia	Clay	(Republic of Ireland) Conor Niland	6–4, 7–5
17.	2007	Maribor, Slovenia	Clay	(Austria) Christian Magg	6–1, 2–6, 6–2
18.	2007	Bosnia-Herzegovina	Clay	(Austria) Rainer Eitzinger	6–4, 6–7^{(2)}, 6–3
19.	2008	Maribor, Slovenia	Clay	(Croatia) Vjekoslav Skenderovic	6–1, 6–2
20.	2009	Maribor, Slovenia	Clay	(Slovenia) Aljaž Bedene	5–7, 6–3, 6–4
