= 2001 ITF Men's Circuit =

Details

Achievements (singles)

The 2001 ITF Men's Circuit was the 2001 edition of the third-tier tour for men's professional tennis. It was organised by the International Tennis Federation and is a tier below the ATP Challenger Tour. The ITF Men's Circuit included satellite events and 277 'Futures' tournaments played year round across six continents, with prize money ranging from $10,000 to $15,000.

== Futures events ==
$15,000 tournaments
$10,000 tournaments

=== January ===
Tournament	Date	City	Surface	Singles champions	Doubles champions
France F1 Futures $10,000	January 8	Grasse; France	Clay (i)	(Spain) Rubén Ramírez Hidalgo	(Spain) Marc Canovas (Andorra) Joan Jimenez-Guerra
India F1 Futures $10,000	January 8	Jorhat; India	Clay	(Germany) Denis Gremelmayr	(India) Syed Fazaluddin (Uzbekistan) Dmitri Tomashevich
USA F1 Futures $15,000	January 8	Aventura; USA	Hard	(France) Thomas Dupré	(United States) Mardy Fish (United States) Jeff Morrison
France F2 Futures $15,000	January 15	Angers; France	Clay (i)	(France) Grégory Carraz	(Belgium) Wim Neefs (Belgium) Kristof Vliegen
India F2 Futures $10,000	January 15	Calcutta; India	Clay	(Czech Republic) Jaroslav Levinský	(India) Syed Fazaluddin (Uzbekistan) Dmitri Tomashevich
USA F2 Futures $15,000	January 15	Delray Beach; USA	Hard	(Japan) Yaoki Ishii	(Israel) Noam Behr (Israel) Andy Ram
France F3 Futures $10,000	January 22	Feucherolles; France	Clay (i)	(Spain) Feliciano López	(Spain) Marc López (Spain) Santiago Ventura
India F3 Futures $10,000	January 22	Bangalore; India	Hard	(Austria) Martin Spöttl	(India) Srinath Prahlad (Austria) Martin Spöttl
USA F3 Futures $15,000	January 22	Hallandale Beach; USA	Hard	(Russia) Dmitry Tursunov	(Canada) Frédéric Niemeyer (Canada) Jocelyn Robichaud
France F4 Futures $15,000	January 29	Deauville; France	Clay (i)	(France) Paul-Henri Mathieu	(Belgium) Wim Neefs (Belgium) Kristof Vliegen

=== February ===
Tournament	Date	City	Surface	Singles champions	Doubles champions
France F5 Futures $10,000	February 5	Bressuire; France	Hard (i)	(Belgium) Jeroen Masson	(Croatia) Ivan Cinkus (Croatia) Željko Krajan
Great Britain F1 Futures $15,000	February 5	Nottingham; Great Britain	Carpet (i)	(Belgium) Arnaud Fontaine	(United Kingdom) James Davidson (United Kingdom) Oliver Freelove
Mexico F1 Futures $10,000	February 5	Chetumal; Mexico	Hard	(Brazil) Marcos Daniel	(Czech Republic) Josef Neštický (Czech Republic) Jiri Vrbka
Great Britain F2 Futures $15,000	February 12	Glasgow; Great Britain	Hard (i)	(Belgium) Arnaud Fontaine	(Italy) Daniele Bracciali (Italy) Stefano Pescosolido
Croatia F1 Futures $15,000	February 12	Zagreb; Croatia	Hard (i)	(Croatia) Lovro Zovko	(Slovenia) Andrej Kračman (Slovenia) Borut Urh
Mexico F2 Futures $10,000	February 12	Cancún; Mexico	Hard	(Venezuela) José de Armas	(Canada) Andrew Nisker (United States) Tripp Phillips
USA F4 Futures $15,000	February 12	Corpus Christi; USA	Hard	(South Africa) Damien Roberts	(South Africa) Justin Bower (South Africa) Damien Roberts
Croatia F2 Futures $15,000	February 19	Zagreb; Croatia	Hard (i)	(Croatia) Lovro Zovko	(Croatia) Roko Karanušić (Croatia) Lovro Zovko
USA F5 Futures $15,000	February 19	Houston; USA	Hard	(South Africa) Jeff Coetzee	(Brazil) Daniel Melo (Brazil) Flávio Saretta
Cuba F1 Futures $10,000	February 19	Havana; Cuba	Hard	(Argentina) Gustavo Marcaccio	(Israel) Assaf Drori (Israel) Amir Hadad
USA F6 Futures $15,000	February 26	Tyler; USA	Hard	(United States) Jeff Morrison	(South Africa) Jeff Coetzee (South Africa) Damien Roberts
New Zealand F1 Futures $10,000	February 26	Ashburton; New Zealand	Hard	(Sweden) Björn Rehnquist	(Australia) Ashley Ford (Australia) Jordan Kerr

=== March ===
Tournament	Date	City	Surface	Singles champions	Doubles champions
New Zealand F2 Futures $10,000	March 5	Christchurch; New Zealand	Hard	(Greece) Vasilis Mazarakis	(Sweden) Henrik Andersson (Sweden) Björn Rehnquist
Argentina F1 Futures $10,000	March 12	Mendoza; Argentina	Clay	(Uruguay) Pablo Bianchi	(Argentina) Diego Veronelli (Argentina) Martín Vassallo Argüello
Japan F1 Futures $10,000	March 12	Takamori; Japan	Carpet	(Austria) Alexander Peya	(Austria) Alexander Peya (Germany) Lars Uebel
New Zealand F3 Futures $10,000	March 12	Tauranga; New Zealand	Hard	(Sweden) Henrik Andersson	(Canada) Jocelyn Robichaud (New Zealand) Wesley Whitehouse
France F6 Futures $15,000	March 19	Poitiers; France	Hard (i)	(Belgium) Dick Norman	(Croatia) Ivo Karlović (Croatia) Lovro Zovko
Argentina F2 Futures $10,000	March 19	Buenos Aires; Argentina	Clay	(Argentina) Diego Veronelli	
Japan F2 Futures $10,000	March 19	Shirako; Japan	Carpet	(Japan) Takahiro Terachi	(Austria) Alexander Peya (Germany) Lars Uebel
France F7 Futures $10,000	March 26	Melun; France	Carpet (i)	(Belgium) Dick Norman	(Argentina) Cristian Kordasz (United States) Mirko Pehar
Japan F3 Futures $10,000	March 26	Isawa; Japan	Clay	(Germany) Lars Uebel	(Austria) Alexander Peya (Germany) Lars Uebel
USA F7 Futures $15,000	March 26	Mobile; USA	Hard	(United States) Michael Russell	(United States) Robert Kendrick (United States) Michael Russell
Australia F1 Futures $15,000	March 26	Buddina; Australia	Hard	(Sweden) Joachim Johansson	(Australia) Todd Larkham (Australia) Todd Perry
Argentina F3 Futures $10,000	March 27	Santa Fe; Argentina	Clay	(Argentina) Leonardo Olguín	(Brazil) Ricardo Schlachter (Brazil) Bruno Soares

=== April ===
Tournament	Date	City	Surface	Singles champions	Doubles champions
France F8 Futures $15,000	April 2	Saint-Brieuc; France	Clay (i)	(Argentina) Cristian Kordasz	(Argentina) Cristian Kordasz (Netherlands) Rogier Wassen
USA F8 Futures $15,000	April 2	Little Rock; USA	Hard	(Sweden) Fredrik Jonsson	(South Africa) Jeff Coetzee (South Africa) Shaun Rudman
Australia F2 Futures $15,000	April 2	Brisbane; Australia	Hard	(Australia) Todd Larkham	(Australia) Todd Larkham (Australia) Todd Perry
USA F9 Futures $15,000	April 9	Stone Mountain; USA	Hard	(Russia) Andrei Cherkasov	(United States) Gavin Sontag (Canada) Jerry Turek
Kuwait F1 Futures $10,000	April 9	Mishref; Kuwait	Hard	(Luxembourg) Gilles Müller	(Czech Republic) Igor Brukner (Slovakia) Martin Hromec
USA F10 Futures $15,000	April 16	Elkin; USA	Hard	(United States) Robert Kendrick	(Australia) Matthew Breen (South Africa) Gareth Williams
Kuwait F2 Futures $10,000	April 16	Mishref; Kuwait	Hard (i)	(Netherlands) Rogier Wassen	(Germany) Florian Jeschonek (Germany) Arne Kreitz
Brazil F1 Futures $15,000	April 16	Rio de Janeiro; Brazil	Clay	(Brazil) Thiago Alves	(Italy) Enzo Artoni (Argentina) Juan Pablo Guzmán
Brazil F2 Futures $15,000	April 23	Teresópolis; Brazil	Clay	(Brazil) Ricardo Mello	(Brazil) Márcio Carlsson (Brazil) Ricardo Schlachter
Kuwait F3 Futures $10,000	April 23	Mishref; Kuwait	Hard (i)	(Austria) Alexander Peya	(Australia) Phillip Harris (Australia) Todd Perry
Algeria F1 Futures $15,000	April 23	Algiers; Algeria	Clay	(Italy) Leonardo Azzaro	(Italy) Leonardo Azzaro (Italy) Fabio Maggi
Uzbekistan F1 Futures $15,000	April 23	Namangan; Uzbekistan	Hard	(Indonesia) Suwandi	(Russia) Vadim Kutsenko (Uzbekistan) Oleg Ogorodov
Argentina F4 Futures $10,000	April 23	Mendoza; Argentina	Clay	(Argentina) Guillermo Carry	(Argentina) Juan Pablo Guzmán (Argentina) Cristian Villagrán
Great Britain F3 Futures $15,000	April 24	Bournemouth; Great Britain	Clay	(Australia) Todd Larkham	(Australia) Ben Ellwood (Australia) Todd Larkham
Germany F1 Futures $10,000	April 24	Riemerling; Germany	Clay	(France) Jean-Baptiste Perlant	(Germany) Franz Stauder (Germany) Alexander Waske
Uzbekistan F2 Futures $15,000	April 30	Andijan; Uzbekistan	Hard	(Indonesia) Suwandi	(Finland) Tuomas Ketola (Australia) Jordan Kerr
China F1 Futures $15,000	April 30	Kunming City; China, P.R.	Hard	(Japan) Michihisa Onoda	(Australia) Ashley Ford (Australia) Domenic Marafiote
Germany F2 Futures $15,000	April 30	Esslingen; Germany	Clay	(Norway) Jan Frode Andersen	(Germany) Franz Stauder (Germany) Alexander Waske
Algeria F2 Futures $15,000	April 30	Algiers; Algeria	Clay	(Italy) Stefano Galvani	(Italy) Leonardo Azzaro (Spain) Marc Canovas
Italy F1 Futures $10,000	April 30	Tortoreto Lido; Italy	Clay	(France) Paul-Henri Mathieu	(Argentina) Diego Álvarez (Italy) Nahuel Fracassi
Argentina F5 Futures $10,000	April 30	Córdoba; Argentina	Clay	(Argentina) Mariano Delfino	(Argentina) Mariano Delfino (Argentina) Patricio Rudi
Mexico F3 Futures $10,000	April 30	Aguascalientes; Mexico	Hard	(Mexico) Miguel Gallardo Valles	(Canada) Frédéric Niemeyer (United States) Doug Root
Slovak Rep. F1 Futures $10,000	April 30	Levice; Slovakia	Clay	(Romania) Victor Hănescu	(Czech Republic) Petr Dezort (Czech Republic) Radomír Vašek

=== May ===
Tournament	Date	City	Surface	Singles champions	Doubles champions
Great Britain F4 Futures $15,000	May 1	Hatfield; Great Britain	Clay	(Finland) Tapio Nurminen	(Australia) Luke Bourgeois (Australia) Ben Ellwood
USA F11 Futures $15,000	May 7	Vero Beach; USA	Clay	(Brazil) Ricardo Mello	(Sweden) Daniel Andersson (United States) Ryan Sachire
Germany F3 Futures $15,000	May 7	Neckarau; Germany	Clay	(Australia) Paul Baccanello	(Spain) David Caballero (Romania) Ionuț Moldovan
Austria F2 Futures $15,000	May 7	Telfs; Austria	Clay	(Netherlands) Rogier Wassen	(Austria) Alexander Peya (Austria) Thomas Strengberger
China F2 Futures $15,000	May 7	Kunming City; China, P.R.	Hard	(Switzerland) Yves Allegro	(United States) Doug Bohaboy (Australia) Luke Smith
Italy F2 Futures $10,000	May 7	Valdengo; Italy	Clay	(France) Paul-Henri Mathieu	(Italy) Matteo Colla (Italy) Alessandro Da Col
Argentina F6 Futures $10,000	May 7	Buenos Aires; Argentina	Clay	(Argentina) Diego Veronelli	(Argentina) Patricio Rudi (Argentina) Martín Vassallo Argüello
Mexico F4 Futures $10,000	May 7	Guadalajara; Mexico	Clay	(Canada) Frédéric Niemeyer	(Brazil) Ricardo Schlachter (Brazil) Bruno Soares
Slovak Rep. F2 Futures $10,000	May 8	Prievidza; Slovakia	Clay	(Romania) Victor Hănescu	(Slovakia) Viktor Bruthans (Romania) Victor Hănescu
Great Britain F5 Futures $15,000	May 8	Newcastle; Great Britain	Clay	(France) Sébastien de Chaunac	(Sweden) Fredrik Lovén (Sweden) Nicklas Timfjord
Japan F4 Futures $15,000	May 14	Fukuoka; Japan	Hard	(Chinese Taipei) Jimmy Wang	(United States) Doug Bohaboy (Australia) Luke Smith
USA F12 Futures $15,000	May 14	Hallandale Beach; USA	Clay	(Peru) Iván Miranda	(Venezuela) José de Armas (Venezuela) Nicolás Pereira
Italy F3 Futures $10,000	May 14	Latina; Italy	Clay	(Italy) Gianluca Luddi	(France) Julien Mathieu (Luxembourg) Mike Scheidweiler
Austria F3 Futures $15,000	May 14	Kramsach; Austria	Clay	(Croatia) Ivo Karlović	(Finland) Kim Tiilikainen (Germany) Jan Weinzierl
Greece F1 Futures $10,000	May 14	Chalcis; Greece	Hard	(Slovenia) Marko Tkalec	(Canada) Philip Gubenco (Canada) Jocelyn Robichaud
Yugoslavia F1 Futures $10,000	May 14	Palić; Yugoslavia	Clay	(Federal Republic of Yugoslavia) Alex Vlaški	(Canada) Dominic Boulet (Germany) Sebastian Fitz
Mexico F5 Futures $10,000	May 14	Cancún; Mexico	Hard	(Cuba) Lázaro Navarro	(Brazil) Ricardo Schlachter (Brazil) Bruno Soares
Slovak Rep. F3 Futures $10,000	May 15	Trnava; Slovakia	Clay	(Slovakia) Boris Borgula	(Poland) Bartłomiej Dąbrowski (Poland) Mariusz Fyrstenberg
Japan F5 Futures $15,000	May 21	Fukuoka; Japan	Hard	(Japan) Takahiro Terachi	(Japan) Yaoki Ishii (Japan) Takahiro Terachi
Italy F4 Futures $10,000	May 21	Viterbo; Italy	Clay	(Italy) Francesco Aldi	(Brazil) Eduardo Frick (Italy) Tomas Tenconi
USA F13 Futures $15,000	May 21	Tampa; USA	Clay	(Sweden) Daniel Andersson	(Mexico) Enrique Abaroa (Australia) Lee Pearson
Greece F2 Futures $10,000	May 21	Kalamata; Greece	Hard	(Slovenia) Marko Tkalec	(Australia) Luke Bourgeois (Australia) Josh Tuckfield
Morocco F1 Futures $10,000	May 21	Rabat; Morocco	Clay	(Morocco) Mehdi Tahiri	(Spain) Javier García-Sintes (Spain) Ezequiel Velez
Yugoslavia F2 Futures $10,000	May 21	Belgrade; Yugoslavia	Clay	(Federal Republic of Yugoslavia) Janko Tipsarević	(Australia) Phillip Harris (Australia) Dejan Petrović
Czech Rep. F1 Futures $10,000	May 21	Most; Czech Republic	Clay	(Croatia) Roko Karanušić	(Czech Republic) Martin Bartonek (Czech Republic) Petr Dezort
Czech Rep. F2 Futures $10,000	May 28	Jablonec nad Nisou; Czech Republic	Clay	(Spain) Didac Pérez	(Slovakia) Karol Beck (Slovakia) Branislav Sekáč
Yugoslavia F3 Futures $10,000	May 28	Belgrade; Yugoslavia	Clay	(Spain) Rubén Ramírez Hidalgo	(Australia) Phillip Harris (Australia) Dejan Petrović
South Africa F1 Futures $10,000	May 28	Durban; South Africa	Hard	(South Africa) Rik de Voest	(South Africa) Wesley Moodie (South Africa) Shaun Rudman
Morocco F2 Futures $10,000	May 28	Marrakesh; Morocco	Clay	(Morocco) Mehdi Tahiri	(Morocco) Jalal Chafai (Kuwait) Mohammad Ghareeb
USA F14 Futures $15,000	May 28	Seminole; USA	Clay	(Australia) James Sekulov	(United States) Jeff Laski (United States) Brian Wilson
Italy F5 Futures $10,000	May 28	Pavia; Italy	Clay	(Italy) Giorgio Galimberti	(Italy) Fabio Colangelo (Italy) Potito Starace
Greece F3 Futures $10,000	May 28	Syros; Greece	Hard	(Slovenia) Marko Tkalec	(Australia) Luke Bourgeois (Australia) Josh Tuckfield
Korea Rep. F1 Futures $15,000	May 28	Seoul; Korea, Rep.	Clay	(South Korea) Lee Seung-hoon	(South Korea) Chung Hee-sung (South Korea) Song Hyeong-keun
Germany F4A Futures $15,000	May 28	Oberweier; Germany	Clay	(Spain) Marc López	(Argentina) Leonardo Olguín (Argentina) Martín Vassallo Argüello

=== June ===
Tournament	Date	City	Surface	Singles champions	Doubles champions
Korea Rep. F2 Futures $15,000	June 4	Seoul; Korea, Rep.	Clay	(South Korea) Chung Hee-seok	(New Zealand) Lee Radovanovich (Thailand) Danai Udomchoke
Slovenia F1 Futures $10,000	June 4	Maribor; Slovenia	Clay	(Slovenia) Iztok Božič	(Croatia) Ivan Cinkus (Slovenia) Marko Tkalec
Italy F6 Futures $10,000	June 4	Verona; Italy	Clay	(Italy) Andrea Stoppini	(Argentina) Diego Álvarez (Italy) Nahuel Fracassi
Morocco F3 Futures $10,000	June 4	Agadir; Morocco	Clay	(Spain) Marc Fornell Mestres	(Australia) Kane Dewhurst (Australia) David McNamara
Germany F4 Futures $15,000	June 4	Villingen; Germany	Clay	(Sweden) Johan Settergren	(Sweden) Johan Settergren (Netherlands) Melle van Gemerden
South Africa F2 Futures $10,000	June 4	Durban; South Africa	Hard	(South Africa) Rik de Voest	(United States) Robert Kowalczyk (United States) Ben Miles
Czech Rep. F3 Futures $10,000	June 4	Karlovy Vary; Czech Republic	Clay	(Poland) Bartłomiej Dąbrowski	(France) Guillaume Marx (Finland) Kim Tiilikainen
Germany F5 Futures $15,000	June 11	Trier; Germany	Clay	(Argentina) Cristian Kordasz	(Argentina) Cristian Kordasz (Netherlands) Rogier Wassen
Slovenia F2 Futures $10,000	June 11	Maribor; Slovenia	Clay	(Finland) Kim Tiilikainen	(Poland) Bartłomiej Dąbrowski (Poland) Mariusz Fyrstenberg
Macedonia F1 Futures $10,000	June 11	Skopje; Macedonia	Clay	(Bulgaria) Ilia Kushev	(Croatia) Ivan Cinkus (Hungary) Gergely Kisgyörgy
USA F15 Futures $15,000	June 11	Sunnyvale; USA	Hard	(United States) Robby Ginepri	(United States) Jeff Laski (United States) Nick Rainey
Canada F1 Futures $10,000	June 11	Mississauga; Canada	Hard	(India) Harsh Mankad	(Canada) Andrew Nisker (United States) Tripp Phillips
Italy F7 Futures $15,000	June 11	Turin; Italy	Clay	(Russia) Igor Kunitsyn	(Australia) Alun Jones (Australia) Todd Larkham
South Africa F3 Futures $10,000	June 11	Benoni; South Africa	Hard		
Namibia F1 Futures $10,000	June 11	Windhoek; Namibia	Hard	(South Africa) W.P. Meyer	(South Africa) Andrew Anderson (South Africa) Dirk Stegmann
Brazil F3 Futures $15,000	June 11	São Paulo; Brazil	Clay	(Brazil) Daniel Melo	(Brazil) Adriano Ferreira (Argentina) Diego Veronelli
Brazil F4 Futures $15,000	June 18	Florianópolis; Brazil	Clay	(Brazil) Marcos Daniel	(Brazil) Márcio Carlsson (Brazil) Ricardo Schlachter
Slovenia F3 Futures $10,000	June 18	Kranj; Slovenia	Clay	(Austria) Herbert Wiltschnig	(Czech Republic) Igor Brukner (Czech Republic) Josef Neštický
Germany F6 Futures $10,000	June 18	Kassel; Germany	Clay	(Luxembourg) Mike Scheidweiler	(Uzbekistan) Dmitri Tomashevich (Ukraine) Orest Tereshchuk
Macedonia F2 Futures $10,000	June 18	Skopje; Macedonia	Clay	(Bulgaria) Todor Enev	(Russia) Mikhail Elgin (Russia) Evgueni Smirnov
USA F16 Futures $15,000	June 18	Redding; USA	Hard	(Australia) Peter Luczak	(United States) Trace Fielding (United States) Jimmy Haney
Canada F2 Futures $10,000	June 18	Montreal; Canada	Hard	(France) Benjamin Cassaigne	(Canada) Nicolas Brochu (Canada) Bobby Kokavec
France F9 Futures $15,000	June 18	Noisy Le Grand; France	Clay	(Spain) Rubén Ramírez Hidalgo	(France) Xavier Pujo (Morocco) Mehdi Tahiri
France F10 Futures $15,000	June 25	Toulon; France	Clay	(France) Jean-Baptiste Perlant	(Australia) Luke Bourgeois (Australia) Alun Jones
Turkey F1 Futures $10,000	June 25	Istanbul; Turkey	Hard	(Israel) Nir Welgreen	(Israel) Lior Dahan (Israel) Nir Welgreen
Macedonia F3 Futures $10,000	June 25	Skopje; Macedonia	Hard	(Bulgaria) Milen Velev	(Bulgaria) Todor Enev (Bulgaria) Milen Velev
USA F17 Futures $15,000	June 25	Chico; USA	Hard	(Australia) Jaymon Crabb	(United States) Diego Ayala (United States) Geoff Abrams
Canada F3 Futures $10,000	June 25	Lachine; Canada	Hard	(France) Benjamin Cassaigne	(United States) Cary Franklin (India) Harsh Mankad
Brazil F5 Futures $15,000	June 25	Curitiba; Brazil	Clay	(Argentina) Diego Veronelli	(Argentina) Sebastián Decoud (Argentina) Sebastian Uriarte
Hungary F1 Futures $10,000	June 25	Sopron; Hungary	Clay	(Slovakia) Michal Mertiňák	(Hungary) Kornél Bardóczky (Hungary) Zoltán Nagy
USA F17A Futures $10,000	June 25	Quogue; USA	Clay	(United States) Brian Vahaly	(United States) Bo Hodge (United States) Michael Sell

=== July ===
Tournament	Date	City	Surface	Singles champions	Doubles champions
Slovak Rep. F4 Futures $10,000	July 2	Poprad; Slovakia	Clay	(Slovakia) Juraj Hasko	(Slovakia) Boris Borgula (Slovakia) Tomas Janci
USA F17B Futures $10,000	July 2	Pittsburgh; USA	Clay	(Australia) Jaymon Crabb	(United States) Andrew Colombo (United States) Bo Hodge
Hungary F2 Futures $10,000	July 2	Pécs; Hungary	Clay	(Slovenia) Iztok Božič	(Hungary) Kornél Bardóczky (Hungary) Zoltán Nagy
Turkey F2 Futures $10,000	July 2	Istanbul; Turkey	Hard	(Israel) Noam Behr	(Uzbekistan) Dmitri Tomashevich (Israel) Nir Welgreen
Romania F1 Futures $10,000	July 2	Bucharest; Romania	Clay	(Greece) Konstantinos Economidis	(Luxembourg) Mike Scheidweiler (France) Mickael Sicco
Turkey F3 Futures $10,000	July 9	Istanbul; Turkey	Hard	(Uzbekistan) Dmitri Tomashevich	(Australia) Ashley Ford (Australia) David McNamara
Spain F1 Futures $15,000	July 9	Alicante; Spain	Clay	(Spain) Iván Navarro	(Spain) Francesc Lleal (Spain) Angel Jose Martin
France F11 Futures $15,000	July 9	Bourg-en-Bresse; France	Clay	(Algeria) Slimane Saoudi	(France) Julien Benneteau (France) Nicolas Mahut
Romania F2 Futures $10,000	July 9	Bucharest; Romania	Clay	(Romania) Victor Hănescu	(Romania) Victor Hănescu (Romania) Victor Ioniță
Hungary F3 Futures $10,000	July 9	Budapest; Hungary	Clay	(Austria) Wolfgang Schranz	(Hungary) Kornél Bardóczky (Hungary) Zoltán Nagy
USA F17C Futures $10,000	July 9	Peoria; USA	Clay	(Argentina) Ignacio González King	(North Macedonia) Lazar Magdinčev (New Zealand) Mark Nielsen
Slovak Rep. F5 Futures $10,000	July 9	Bratislava; Slovakia	Clay	(Czech Republic) Igor Brukner	(Slovenia) Borut Urh (Slovakia) Igor Zelenay
Spain F2 Futures $15,000	July 16	Elche; Spain	Clay	(Spain) Francisco Fogués	(Spain) Quino Muñoz (Spain) Fernando Verdasco
France F12 Futures $10,000	July 16	Aix-en-Provence; France	Clay	(Algeria) Slimane Saoudi	(France) Cyril Martin (Australia) Anthony Ross
Italy F8 Futures $10,000	July 16	Trani; Italy	Clay	(Argentina) Nicolás Todero	(Chile) Jaime Fillol Jr. (Chile) Miguel Miranda
Germany F7 Futures $15,000	July 16	Zell; Germany	Clay	(Spain) Carlos Cuadrado	(Australia) Stephen Huss (Australia) Lee Pearson
Georgia F1 Futures $15,000	July 16	Tbilisi; Georgia	Clay	(Russia) Mikhail Elgin	(Russia) Artem Derepasko (Uzbekistan) Abdul Hamid Makhkamov
USA F18 Futures $15,000	July 16	Joplin; USA	Hard	(Australia) Peter Luczak	(United States) Ryan Sachire (United States) Jeff Williams
Slovak Rep. F6 Futures $10,000	July 16	Ružomberok; Slovakia	Clay	(Czech Republic) Jan Hájek	(Slovakia) Juraj Hasko (Slovakia) Ladislav Simon
Romania F3 Futures $10,000	July 16	Brașov; Romania	Clay	(Romania) Gabriel Moraru	(Argentina) Roberto Álvarez (France) Jordane Doble
Spain F3 Futures $10,000	July 23	Gandia; Spain	Clay	(Spain) Francisco Fogués	(Spain) Jordi Fernandez (Spain) Angel Jose Martin
Italy F9 Futures $10,000	July 23	Rimini; Italy	Clay	(Italy) Davide Scala	(Italy) Francesco Aldi (Italy) Stefano Mocci
Germany F8 Futures $10,000	July 23	Leun; Germany	Clay	(Germany) Benjamin Kohllöffel	(Netherlands) Johan Dijkstra (Netherlands) Raoul Snijders
USA F19 Futures $15,000	July 23	St. Joseph; USA	Hard	(France) Thomas Dupré	(Australia) Peter Luczak (United States) Chris Magyary
Georgia F2 Futures $15,000	July 23	Tbilisi; Georgia	Clay	(Russia) Artem Derepasko	(Russia) Artem Derepasko (Russia) Mikhail Elgin
France F13 Futures $10,000	July 23	Aix-Les-Bains; France	Clay	(France) Florent Serra	(Italy) Alessandro Da Col (Italy) Giuseppe Menga
Chinese Taipei F1 Futures $15,000	July 30	Kaohsiung; Chinese Taipei	Hard	(South Korea) Kim Dong-hyun	(Australia) Ashley Ford (Indonesia) Peter Handoyo
Italy F10 Futures $10,000	July 30	Iesi; Italy	Clay	(Italy) Alessio di Mauro	(Italy) Gianluca Bazzica (Italy) Fabio Colangelo
France F14 Futures $10,000	July 30	Valescure; France	Hard	(France) Thierry Ascione	(Australia) Andrew Derer (Australia) Anthony Ross
Spain F4 Futures $10,000	July 30	Dénia; Spain	Clay	(Spain) Iván Navarro	(Colombia) Alejandro Falla (Colombia) Pablo González
Estonia F1 Futures $10,000	July 30	Pärnu; Estonia	Clay	(Lithuania) Rolandas Muraška	(Sweden) Johan Brunström (Sweden) Jon Wallmark
Germany F9 Futures $10,000	July 30	Berlin; Germany	Clay		
USA F20 Futures $15,000	July 30	Decatur; USA	Hard	(France) Thomas Dupré	(United States) Trace Fielding (United States) Michael Yani
Argentina F7 Futures $10,000	July 30	Buenos Aires; Argentina	Clay	(Argentina) Diego Moyano	(Argentina) Daniel Caracciolo (Argentina) Martín Vassallo Argüello

=== August ===
Tournament	Date	City	Surface	Singles champions	Doubles champions
Latvia F1 Futures $10,000	August 6	Jūrmala; Latvia	Clay	(Bulgaria) Radoslav Lukaev	(Czech Republic) Igor Brukner (Croatia) Ivan Cerović
Spain F5 Futures $10,000	August 6	Xàtiva; Spain	Clay	(Spain) Mario Munoz-Bejarano	(Spain) Carlos Rexach-Itoiz (Spain) Gabriel Trujillo Soler
USA F21 Futures $15,000	August 6	Godfrey; USA	Hard	(Australia) Peter Luczak	(Australia) Peter Luczak (United States) Chris Magyary
Argentina F8 Futures $10,000	August 6	Buenos Aires; Argentina	Clay	(Argentina) Daniel Caracciolo	(Argentina) Daniel Caracciolo (Argentina) Martín Vassallo Argüello
Luxembourg F1 Futures $10,000	August 6	Luxembourg; Luxembourg	Clay	(France) Nicolas Mahut	(Luxembourg) Gilles Müller (Luxembourg) Mike Scheidweiler
Chinese Taipei F2 Futures $15,000	August 6	Kaohsiung; Chinese Taipei	Hard	(Japan) Tasuku Iwami	(South Korea) Chung Hee-sung (South Korea) Song Hyeong-keun
Egypt F1 Futures $10,000	August 6	Cairo; Egypt	Clay	(Czech Republic) Martin Bartonek	(Czech Republic) Michal Navrátil (Czech Republic) Jaroslav Pospíšil
Great Britain F6 Futures $15,000	August 7	Bath; Great Britain	Hard	(Australia) David McNamara	(United Kingdom) Simon Dickson (United Kingdom) James Nelson
Spain F6 Futures $15,000	August 13	Vigo; Spain	Clay	(Morocco) Mounir El Aarej	(Spain) Pedro Canovas (Spain) Angel Jose Martin
Argentina F9 Futures $10,000	August 13	Buenos Aires; Argentina	Clay	(Argentina) Juan Pablo Brzezicki	(Argentina) Daniel Caracciolo (Argentina) Eduardo Medica
Lithuania F1 Futures $10,000	August 13	Vilnius; Lithuania	Clay	(Bulgaria) Radoslav Lukaev	(Finland) Lauri Kiiski (Finland) Tero Vilen
Egypt F2 Futures $10,000	August 13	Giza; Egypt	Clay	(Czech Republic) Michal Navrátil	(Czech Republic) Michal Navrátil (Czech Republic) Jaroslav Pospíšil
Russia F1 Futures $15,000	August 13	Balashikha; Russia	Clay	(Slovakia) Karol Beck	(Slovakia) Karol Beck (Slovakia) Igor Zelenay
Luxembourg F2 Futures $10,000	August 13	Luxembourg; Luxembourg	Clay	(France) Jordane Doble	(Germany) Sebastian Fitz (Australia) Jay Gooding
Nigeria F1 Futures $15,000	August 13	Lagos; Nigeria	Hard	(France) Mohamed-Sekou Drame	(Mauritius) Jean Marcel Bourgaul Du Coudray (South Africa) W.P. Meyer
Great Britain F7 Futures $15,000	August 14	Cumberland; Great Britain	Hard	(France) Julien Couly	(United Kingdom) Simon Dickson (United Kingdom) James Nelson
Spain F7 Futures $15,000	August 20	Irun; Spain	Clay	(Spain) Quino Muñoz	(Spain) Quino Muñoz (Spain) Fernando Verdasco
Netherlands F1 Futures $15,000	August 20	Enschede; Netherlands	Clay	(Croatia) Mario Radić	(Belgium) Kristof Vliegen (Belgium) Stefan Wauters
Nigeria F2 Futures $15,000	August 20	Lagos; Nigeria	Hard	(France) Mohamed-Sekou Drame	(Mauritius) Jean Marcel Bourgaul Du Coudray (South Africa) W.P. Meyer
Russia F2 Futures $15,000	August 20	Saransk; Russia	Clay	(Ukraine) Orest Tereshchuk	(Belarus) Alexander Shvets (Ukraine) Orest Tereshchuk
Egypt F3 Futures $10,000	August 20	Al Mansoura; Egypt	Clay	(Czech Republic) Martin Bartonek	(Czech Republic) Martin Bartonek (Czech Republic) Michal Navrátil
Poland F1 Futures $10,000	August 20	Poznań; Poland	Clay	(Poland) Mariusz Fyrstenberg	(Poland) Filip Aniola (Poland) Krzysztof Kwinta
Peru F1 Futures $10,000	August 27	Lima; Peru	Clay	(Ecuador) Giovanni Lapentti	(Uruguay) Marcelo Barboza (Argentina) Dario Perez
Netherlands F2 Futures $15,000	August 27	Alphen aan den Rijn; Netherlands	Clay	(Germany) Jan Weinzierl	(Netherlands) Melvyn op der Heijde (Germany) Jan Weinzierl
Spain F8 Futures $15,000	August 27	Santander; Spain	Clay	(Spain) Miguel Ángel López Jaén	(Spain) Angel Jose Martin (Spain) Santiago Ventura
Poland F2 Futures $10,000	August 27	Wrocław; Poland	Clay	(Poland) Mariusz Fyrstenberg	(Poland) Mariusz Fyrstenberg (Poland) Marcin Matkowski
Mexico F6 Futures $10,000	August 27	Guadalajara; Mexico	Clay	(Argentina) Matías Boeker	(Argentina) Matías Boeker (United States) Bo Hodge
Korea Rep. F3 Futures $15,000	August 27	Cheongju; Korea, Rep.	Clay	(Argentina) Roberto Álvarez	(South Korea) Chung Hee-sung (South Korea) Song Hyeong-keun

=== September ===
Tournament	Date	City	Surface	Singles champions	Doubles champions
Korea Rep. F4 Futures $15,000	September 3	Cheongju; Korea, Rep.	Clay	(France) Jordane Doble	(Argentina) Roberto Álvarez (France) Jordane Doble
Netherlands F3 Futures $15,000	September 3	Hilversum; Netherlands	Clay	(Finland) Kim Tiilikainen	(Australia) David McNamara (New Zealand) Mark Nielsen
Argentina F10 Futures $15,000	September 3	Córdoba; Argentina	Clay	(Argentina) Juan Pablo Brzezicki	(Argentina) Juan Pablo Brzezicki (Argentina) Carlos Berlocq
Mexico F7 Futures $10,000	September 3	Puerto Vallarta; Mexico	Hard	(United States) Chad Carlson	(Argentina) Matías Boeker (United States) Bo Hodge
Poland F3 Futures $10,000	September 3	Wrocław; Poland	Clay	(Sweden) Robert Lindstedt	(Sweden) Robert Lindstedt (Sweden) Filip Prpic
Spain F9 Futures $15,000	September 3	Oviedo; Spain	Clay	(Spain) Santiago Ventura	(Spain) Carlos Rexach-Itoiz (Spain) Gabriel Trujillo Soler
Peru F2 Futures $10,000	September 3	Lima; Peru	Clay	(Chile) Julio Peralta	(Uruguay) Marcelo Barboza (Argentina) Dario Perez
Mexico F8 Futures $10,000	September 10	Mazatlán; Mexico	Hard	(Cuba) Lázaro Navarro	(United States) Marcus Fluitt (Cuba) Lázaro Navarro
Argentina F11 Futures $15,000	September 10	Buenos Aires; Argentina	Clay	(Argentina) Juan Pablo Brzezicki	(Argentina) Daniel Caracciolo (Argentina) Miguel Pastura
France F15 Futures $15,000	September 10	Bagnères-de-Bigorre; France	Hard	(France) Nicolas Mahut	(France) Benjamin Cassaigne (South Africa) Damien Roberts
Spain F10 Futures $10,000	September 10	Madrid; Spain	Hard	(Spain) Santiago Ventura	(Spain) Carlos Rexach-Itoiz (Benin) Arnaud Segodo
Peru F3 Futures $10,000	September 10	Lima; Peru	Clay	(Argentina) Rodolfo Daruich	(Chile) Felipe Parada (Brazil) Rodrigo Schtscherbyna
Japan F6 Futures $10,000	September 10	Kashiwa; Japan	Hard	(United States) Doug Bohaboy	(Japan) Satoshi Iwabuchi (Japan) Mitsuru Takada
Ukraine F1 Futures $15,000	September 10	Horlivka; Ukraine	Clay	(Ukraine) Sergei Yaroshenko	(Croatia) Ivan Cinkus (Hungary) Gergely Kisgyörgy
Sweden F1 Futures $15,000	September 17	Gothenburg; Sweden	Hard (i)	(Sweden) Robin Söderling	(Sweden) Johan Kareld (Sweden) Björn Rehnquist
Italy F11 Futures $15,000	September 17	Oristano; Italy	Hard	(Italy) Stefano Pescosolido	(South Africa) Wesley Moodie (South Africa) Damien Roberts
Great Britain F8 Futures $10,000	September 17	Glasgow; Great Britain	Hard (i)	(Austria) Luben Pampoulov	(United Kingdom) Mark Hilton (New Zealand) Daniel Willman
Japan F7 Futures $10,000	September 17	Chiba; Japan	Hard	(Czech Republic) Radim Žitko	(Japan) Hiroki Kondo (Japan) Takao Suzuki
Bolivia F1 Futures $10,000	September 17	La Paz; Bolivia	Clay	(Chile) Juan-Felipe Yáñez	(Argentina) Sebastián Decoud (Argentina) Sebastian Uriarte
Ukraine F2 Futures $15,000	September 17	Horlivka; Ukraine	Clay	(Croatia) Ivan Cinkus	(Russia) Kirill Ivanov-Smolensky (Netherlands) Melvyn op der Heijde
Spain F11 Futures $15,000	September 17	Barcelona; Spain	Clay	(Spain) Óscar Hernández	(Spain) Óscar Hernández (Spain) Carlos Rexach-Itoiz
France F16 Futures $15,000	September 17	Mulhouse; France	Hard	(Belgium) Arnaud Fontaine	(Switzerland) Yves Allegro (Germany) Franz Stauder
Japan F8 Futures $10,000	September 24	Kawaguchi; Japan	Hard	(United States) Doug Bohaboy	(Australia) Ashley Ford (Australia) Domenic Marafiote
Bolivia F2 Futures $10,000	September 24	Cochabamba; Bolivia	Clay	(Chile) Julio Peralta	(Argentina) Andres Dellatorre (Italy) Nahuel Fracassi
Spain F12 Futures $15,000	September 24	Barcelona; Spain	Clay	(Spain) Óscar Burrieza	(Spain) Antonio Baldellou-Esteva (Spain) Óscar Hernández
Sweden F2 Futures $15,000	September 24	Gothenburg; Sweden	Hard (i)	(Sweden) Kalle Flygt	(Sweden) Robert Lindstedt (Sweden) Fredrik Lovén
Italy F12 Futures $15,000	September 24	Selargius; Italy	Hard	(United States) Thomas Blake	(United States) Thomas Blake (France) Benjamin Cassaigne
France F17 Futures $15,000	September 24	Plaisir; France	Hard	(Canada) Frédéric Niemeyer	(Belgium) Gilles Elseneer (Belgium) Wim Neefs
Great Britain F9 Futures $10,000	September 26	Sunderland; Great Britain	Hard (i)	(Austria) Luben Pampoulov	(United Kingdom) Simon Dickson (United Kingdom) James Nelson

=== October ===
Tournament	Date	City	Surface	Singles champions	Doubles champions
France F18 Futures $15,000	October 1	Nevers; France	Hard (i)	(Canada) Frédéric Niemeyer	(France) Benjamin Cassaigne (South Africa) Rik de Voest
Spain F13 Futures $10,000	October 1	Martos; Spain	Hard	(Spain) Tati Rascón	(Switzerland) Stan Wawrinka (France) Gregory Zavialoff
Great Britain F10 Futures $15,000	October 1	Edinburgh; Great Britain	Hard (i)	(New Zealand) Daniel Willman	(Sweden) Henrik Andersson (United States) Doug Root
Bolivia F3 Futures $10,000	October 1	Santa Cruz; Bolivia	Clay	(Argentina) Andres Dellatorre	(Argentina) Federico Cardinali (Chile) Sergio Elias
Brazil F6 Futures $15,000	October 1	Porto Alegre; Brazil	Clay	(Brazil) Pedro Braga	(Peru) Iván Miranda (Argentina) Patricio Rudi
Hong Kong F1 Futures $15,000	October 2	Hong Kong; Hong Kong, China	Hard	(Chinese Taipei) Lu Yen-hsun	(Germany) Frank Moser (Germany) Bernard Parun
Hong Kong F2 Futures $15,000	October 8	Hong Kong; Hong Kong, China	Hard	(Israel) Eyal Erlich	(Hong Kong) John Hui (Australia) Anthony Ross
Brazil F7 Futures $15,000	October 8	Florianópolis; Brazil	Clay	(Argentina) Cristian Kordasz	(Brazil) Pedro Braga (Brazil) Otavio Rovati
Dominican Republic F1 Futures $10,000	October 8	Santo Domingo; Dominican Republic	Clay	(Germany) Denis Gremelmayr	(United States) Ryan Moore (United States) Nick Rainey
Paraguay F1 Futures $15,000	October 8	Asunción; Paraguay	Clay	(Argentina) Sebastián Decoud	(Argentina) Diego Hartfield (Argentina) Matias O'Neille
Great Britain F11 Futures $15,000	October 8	Leeds; Great Britain	Hard (i)	(Croatia) Lovro Zovko	(Czech Republic) Jaroslav Levinský (Croatia) Lovro Zovko
Uzbekistan F3 Futures $15,000	October 8	Qarshi; Uzbekistan	Hard	(Belarus) Alexander Shvets	(Russia) Kirill Ivanov-Smolensky (Uzbekistan) Dmitri Tomashevich
France F19 Futures $10,000	October 8	Sarreguemines; France	Carpet (i)	(France) Régis Lavergne	(France) Jérôme Hanquez (France) Régis Lavergne
Spain F14 Futures $10,000	October 9	El Ejido; Spain	Hard	(Spain) Tati Rascón	(Japan) Kentaro Masuda (Japan) Norikazu Sugiyama
Greece F4 Futures $10,000	October 15	Corfu; Greece	Carpet	(Greece) Anastasios Vasiliadis	(Australia) Luke Bourgeois (Slovakia) Igor Zelenay
Jamaica F1A Futures $10,000	October 15	Montego Bay; Jamaica	Hard	(United States) Brian Vahaly	(United States) Ryan Moore (United States) Nick Rainey
India F4 Futures $10,000	October 15	Bombay; India	Hard	(India) Srinath Prahlad	(India) Srinath Prahlad (India) Ajay Ramaswami
Uzbekistan F4 Futures $15,000	October 15	Guliston; Uzbekistan	Hard	(Uzbekistan) Dmitri Tomashevich	(Kazakhstan) Alexey Kedryuk (Uzbekistan) Dmitri Tomashevich
France F20 Futures $10,000	October 15	Saint-Dizier; France	Hard (i)	(Czech Republic) Michal Kokta	(France) Vincent Lavergne (France) Nicolas Tourte
Colombia F1 Futures $15,000	October 15	Santa Fe de Bogotá; Colombia	Clay	(Colombia) Michael Quintero	(Argentina) Juan Pablo Guzmán (Argentina) Cristian Villagrán
Paraguay F2 Futures $15,000	October 15	Asunción; Paraguay	Clay	(Argentina) Luciano Vitullo	(Argentina) Sebastián Decoud (Argentina) Sebastian Uriarte
USA F22 Futures $15,000	October 15	Lubbock, Texas; USA	Hard	(United States) Jeff Williams	(Republic of Ireland) John Doran (South Africa) Coenie Van Wyk
USA F23 Futures $15,000	October 22	Jackson; USA	Hard	(United States) Eric Nunez	(New Zealand) James Shortall (Sweden) Jon Wallmark
Colombia F2 Futures $15,000	October 22	Santa Fe de Bogotá; Colombia	Clay	(Colombia) Carlos Salamanca	(Argentina) Gustavo Marcaccio (Argentina) Patricio Rudi
France F21 Futures $15,000	October 22	La Roche-sur-Yon; France	Hard (i)	(France) Régis Lavergne	(France) Jérôme Hanquez (France) Régis Lavergne
India F5 Futures $10,000	October 22	Indore; India	Clay	(India) Srinath Prahlad	(India) Srinath Prahlad (India) Ajay Ramaswami
Venezuela F1 Futures $15,000	October 22	Caracas; Venezuela	Clay	(Italy) Gianluca Luddi	(Venezuela) José de Armas (Ecuador) Giovanni Lapentti
Jamaica F1 Futures $15,000	October 22	Negril; Jamaica	Hard	(United States) Brian Vahaly	(Uruguay) Daniel Montes de Oca (Peru) Juan Carlos Parker
Mexico F9 Futures $15,000	October 22	Cd Obregón; Mexico	Clay	(United States) Andres Pedroso	(Canada) Dominic Boulet (Italy) Manuel Jorquera
Greece F5 Futures $10,000	October 22	Lamia; Greece	Carpet	(Slovakia) Juraj Hasko	(Croatia) Ivan Cerović (Croatia) Ivor Lovrak
USA F24 Futures $15,000	October 29	Hattiesburg; USA	Hard	(United States) Thomas Blake	(United States) Tripp Phillips (United States) Ryan Sachire
France F22 Futures $10,000	October 29	Rodez; France	Hard (i)	(France) Grégory Carraz	(France) Jean-Christophe Faurel (Mauritius) Kamil Patel
Cyprus F1 Futures $10,000	October 29	Nicosia; Cyprus	Clay	(Slovenia) Marko Tkalec	(Slovenia) Marko Tkalec (Slovenia) Matija Zgaga
Mexico F10 Futures $15,000	October 29	Cd Juárez; Mexico	Clay	(Argentina) Nicolás Todero	(Republic of Ireland) John Doran (Australia) Andrew Painter
Jamaica F2 Futures $15,000	October 29	Negril; Jamaica	Clay	(Austria) Zbynek Mlynarik	(Greece) Nikos Rovas (Greece) Anastasios Vasiliadis
Venezuela F2 Futures $15,000	October 29	Caracas; Venezuela	Clay	(Ecuador) Giovanni Lapentti	(Venezuela) José de Armas (Ecuador) Giovanni Lapentti
Czech Rep. F4 Futures $10,000	October 29	Plzeň; Czech Republic	Carpet (i)	(Czech Republic) Martin Štěpánek	(Czech Republic) Martin Bartonek (Czech Republic) Michal Navrátil
Switzerland F1 Futures $10,000	October 29	Biel; Switzerland	Hard (i)	(Switzerland) Stéphane Bohli	(Germany) Carsten Arriens (Germany) Maximilian Abel
India F6 Futures $10,000	October 29	Pune; India	Hard	(Israel) Lior Dahan	(India) Srinath Prahlad (India) Ajay Ramaswami

=== November ===
Tournament	Date	City	Surface	Singles champions	Doubles champions
Switzerland F2 Futures $10,000	November 5	Wil; Switzerland	Carpet (i)	(Germany) Marcello Craca	(Switzerland) Stéphane Bohli (Germany) Philipp Petzschner
Czech Rep. F5 Futures $10,000	November 5	Prague; Czech Republic	Hard (i)	(Czech Republic) Martin Štěpánek	(Czech Republic) Lukáš Dlouhý (Czech Republic) David Miketa
Mexico F11 Futures $15,000	November 5	León; Mexico	Hard	(Mexico) Alejandro Hernández	(Mexico) Bruno Echagaray (Mexico) Santiago González
Thailand F1 Futures $10,000	November 5	Pattaya; Thailand	Hard	(Australia) Luke Bourgeois	(Indonesia) Peter Handoyo (South Africa) Raven Klaasen
Brazil F8 Futures $15,000	November 5	Campinas; Brazil	Clay	(Germany) Jan Weinzierl	(Argentina) Sebastián Decoud (Argentina) Sebastian Uriarte
Barbados F1 Futures $10,000	November 5	Bridgetown; Barbados	Hard	(Netherlands) Fred Hemmes	(Netherlands) Fred Hemmes (New Zealand) Daniel Willman
Australia F3 Futures $15,000	November 5	Beaumaris; Australia	Hard	(Australia) Scott Draper	(Australia) Kane Dewhurst (Australia) Alun Jones
Mexico F12 Futures $15,000	November 12	Zacatecas; Mexico	Hard	(South Africa) Louis Vosloo	(Cuba) Sandor Martínez (Cuba) Lázaro Navarro
Czech Rep. F6 Futures $10,000	November 12	Frýdlant nad Ostravicí; Czech Republic	Hard (i)	(Czech Republic) František Čermák	(Czech Republic) Petr Kovačka (Czech Republic) Kamil Vondráček
Australia F4 Futures $15,000	November 12	Frankston; Australia	Hard	(Australia) Peter Luczak	(Australia) David Hodge (Australia) Peter Luczak
Netherlands Antillies F1 Futures $10,000	November 12	Curaçao; Netherlands Antilles	Hard	(Venezuela) Kepler Orellana	(France) Nicolas Perrein (Luxembourg) Mike Scheidweiler
Brazil F9 Futures $15,000	November 12	Fortaleza; Brazil	Hard	(Brazil) Alessandro Guevara	(Brazil) Alessandro Guevara (Brazil) Rodrigo Ribeiro
Thailand F2 Futures $10,000	November 12	Nonthaburi; Thailand	Hard	(Pakistan) Aisam-ul-Haq Qureshi	(Chinese Taipei) Lu Yen-hsun (Germany) Frank Moser
USA F26 Futures $15,000	November 12	Costa Mesa; USA	Hard	(United States) Chad Carlson	(New Zealand) Mark Nielsen (Australia) Anthony Ross
Switzerland F3 Futures $10,000	November 14	Uster; Switzerland	Carpet (i)	(Switzerland) Jean-Claude Scherrer	(Czech Republic) Jan Říha (Czech Republic) Pavel Říha
Vietnam F1 Futures $15,000	November 19	Hanoi; Vietnam	Hard	(Pakistan) Aisam-ul-Haq Qureshi	(Israel) Lior Dahan (South Africa) Rik de Voest
USA F27 Futures $15,000	November 19	Malibu; USA	Hard	(United States) Paul Goldstein	(United States) Zack Fleishman (New Zealand) Wesley Whitehouse
Brazil F10 Futures $15,000	November 19	Aracaju; Brazil	Hard	(Brazil) Pedro Braga	(Brazil) Pedro Braga (Brazil) Ronaldo Carvalho
Australia F5 Futures $15,000	November 19	Berri; Australia	Grass	(Australia) Joseph Sirianni	(Australia) Ben Ellwood (Australia) Dejan Petrović
Spain F15 Futures $15,000	November 20	Gran Canaria; Spain	Clay	(Finland) Kim Tiilikainen	(Japan) Jun Kato (Germany) Jan Weinzierl
Philippines F1 Futures $15,000	November 26	Manila; Philippines	Hard	(Sweden) Daniel Andersson	(Japan) Hiroki Kondo (Chinese Taipei) Jimmy Wang
Australia F6 Futures $15,000	November 26	Barmera; Australia	Grass	(Australia) Jaymon Crabb	(Australia) Jaymon Crabb (Australia) Joseph Sirianni
USA F28 Futures $15,000	November 26	Laguna Niguel; USA	Hard	(United States) Brian Vahaly	(United States) Diego Ayala (United States) Travis Rettenmaier
Spain F16 Futures $15,000	November 27	Las Palmas; Spain	Clay	(Spain) Iván Navarro	(Japan) Jun Kato (Germany) Jan Weinzierl

=== December ===
Tournament	Date	City	Surface	Singles champions	Doubles champions
Philippines F2 Futures $15,000	December 4	Manila; Philippines	Hard	(Sweden) Daniel Andersson	(Japan) Hiroki Kondo (Chinese Taipei) Jimmy Wang
