= 2003 ITF Men's Circuit =

Men's tennis tournament series

Details

Achievements (singles)

The 2003 ITF Men's Circuit was the 2003 edition of the third-tier tour for men's professional tennis. It was organised by the International Tennis Federation and is a tier below the ATP Challenger Tour. The ITF Men's Circuit included satellite events and 336 'Futures' tournaments played year round across six continents, with prize money ranging from $10,000 to $15,000.

== Futures events ==
$15,000 tournaments
$10,000 tournaments

=== January ===
Tournament	Date	City	Surface	Singles champions	Doubles champions
El Salvador F1 Futures $10,000	January 6	San Salvador; El Salvador	Clay	(Argentina) Juan Pablo Brzezicki	(France) Benjamin Cassaigne (Ivory Coast) Valentin Sanon
France F1 Futures $10,000	January 6	Grasse; France	Clay (i)	(France) Xavier Pujo	(France) Nicolas Mahut (France) Édouard Roger-Vasselin
India F1 Futures $10,000	January 6	Lucknow; India	Grass	(Bulgaria) Todor Enev	(Indonesia) Peter Handoyo (Indonesia) Suwandi
Germany F1A Futures $10,000	January 6	Oberschleißheim; Germany	Hard (i)	(Germany) Tobias Summerer	(Poland) Mariusz Fyrstenberg (Poland) Łukasz Kubot
India F2 Futures $10,000	January 13	New Delhi; India	Carpet	(Russia) Dmitry Vlasov	(India) Mustafa Ghouse (India) Vishal Uppal
USA F1 Futures $10,000	January 13	Tampa; USA	Hard	(Canada) Frank Dancevic	(Canada) Frank Dancevic (Canada) Simon Larose
France F2 Futures $10,000	January 13	Angers; France	Clay (i)	(Spain) Óscar Serrano	(France) Nicolas Mahut (France) Édouard Roger-Vasselin
El Salvador F2 Futures $10,000	January 13	La Libertad; El Salvador	Hard	(Colombia) Alejandro Falla	(Argentina) Juan Pablo Brzezicki (Brazil) Bruno Soares
Germany F1B Futures $10,000	January 13	Biberach; Germany	Hard (i)	(Croatia) Roko Karanušić	(Germany) Daniel Elsner (Germany) Philipp Petzschner
India F3 Futures $10,000	January 20	Jorhat; India	Clay	(Ukraine) Orest Tereshchuk	(India) Mustafa Ghouse (India) Ajay Ramaswami
USA F2 Futures $10,000	January 20	Kissimmee; USA	Hard	(United States) Matías Boeker	(Argentina) Ignacio Hirigoyen (United States) Tripp Phillips
France F3 Futures $15,000	January 20	Deauville; France	Clay (i)	(France) Nicolas Mahut	(Spain) Óscar Hernández (Spain) Óscar Serrano
Great Britain F1 Futures $15,000	January 20	Glasgow; Great Britain	Carpet (i)	(South Africa) Wesley Moodie	(Netherlands) Edwin Kempes (Netherlands) Peter Wessels
Jamaica F1 Futures $15,000	January 20	Montego Bay; Jamaica	Hard	(Argentina) Nicolás Todero	(Argentina) Carlos Berlocq (Argentina) Cristian Villagrán
Guatemala F1 Futures $10,000	January 20	Guatemala; Guatemala	Hard	(Brazil) Bruno Soares	(Dominican Republic) Víctor Estrella Burgos (Dominican Republic) Jhonson García
Germany F1C Futures $10,000	January 20	Oberschleißheim; Germany	Carpet (i)	(Italy) Andreas Seppi	(Slovakia) Michal Mertiňák (Slovakia) Igor Zelenay
Great Britain F2 Futures $15,000	January 27	Nottingham; Great Britain	Carpet (i)	(South Africa) Wesley Moodie	(United Kingdom) Mark Hilton (Israel) Andy Ram
USA F3 Futures $10,000	January 27	Aventura; USA	Hard	(Netherlands) Fred Hemmes	(United States) Tripp Phillips (United States) Ryan Sachire
France F4 Futures $10,000	January 27	Feucherolles; France	Hard (i)	(France) Marc Gicquel	(France) Marc Gicquel (France) Nicolas Mahut
Jamaica F2 Futures $15,000	January 27	Montego Bay; Jamaica	Hard	(Netherlands) Jean-Julien Rojer	(Argentina) Carlos Berlocq (Argentina) Andres Dellatorre

=== February ===
Tournament	Date	City	Surface	Singles champions	Doubles champions
France F5 Futures $10,000	February 3	Bressuire; France	Hard (i)	(France) Jérôme Haehnel	(Brazil) Josh Goffi (United States) Travis Parrott
Spain F1 Futures $10,000	February 3	Murcia; Spain	Hard	(Spain) Salvador Navarro	(Spain) Salvador Navarro (Spain) Santiago Ventura
Portugal F1 Futures $10,000	February 3	Espinho; Portugal	Clay	(Luxembourg) Mike Scheidweiler	(Germany) Christopher Kas (Luxembourg) Mike Scheidweiler
Croatia F1 Futures $15,000	February 10	Zagreb; Croatia	Hard (i)	(Czech Republic) Tomáš Cakl	(Switzerland) Marco Chiudinelli (Italy) Igor Gaudi
Great Britain F3 Futures $15,000	February 10	Southampton; Great Britain	Hard (i)	(United Kingdom) Richard Bloomfield	(United Kingdom) Jonathan Marray (United Kingdom) David Sherwood
Spain F2 Futures $10,000	February 10	Algezares; Spain	Clay	(Spain) Salvador Navarro	(Spain) Salvador Navarro (Spain) Gabriel Trujillo Soler
Portugal F2 Futures $10,000	February 10	Espinho; Portugal	Clay	(France) Jean-Baptiste Perlant	(Slovakia) Michal Mertiňák (Austria) Marco Mirnegg
Brazil F1 Futures $15,000	February 10	São Paulo; Brazil	Clay	(Brazil) Francisco Costa	(Brazil) Thiago Alves (Brazil) Bruno Soares
USA F4 Futures $15,000	February 17	Bronwsville; USA	Hard	(Australia) Andrew Ilie	(United States) Tripp Phillips (United States) Ryan Sachire
Great Britain F4 Futures $15,000	February 17	Redbridge; Great Britain	Hard (i)	(United States) Michael Joyce	(Brazil) Josh Goffi (United States) Travis Parrott
Spain F3 Futures $10,000	February 17	Lorca; Spain	Clay	(Spain) Francisco Fogués	(Spain) Salvador Navarro (Spain) Gabriel Trujillo Soler
Portugal F3 Futures $10,000	February 17	Espinho; Portugal	Clay	(Slovakia) Michal Mertiňák	(Slovakia) Michal Mertiňák (Austria) Marco Mirnegg
Nigeria F1 Futures $15,000	February 17	Benin City; Nigeria	Hard	(Benin) Arnaud Segodo	(Tunisia) Walid Jallali (Tunisia) Malek Jaziri
Brazil F2 Futures $15,000	February 17	Goiânia; Brazil	Hard	(Brazil) Francisco Costa	(Brazil) Pedro Braga (Venezuela) Kepler Orellana
Croatia F2 Futures $15,000	February 17	Zagreb; Croatia		(Croatia) Roko Karanušić	(Croatia) Ivan Cinkus (Slovenia) Andrej Kračman
USA F5 Futures $15,000	February 24	Harlingen; USA	Hard	(United States) Huntley Montgomery	(South Africa) Raven Klaasen (United States) Huntley Montgomery
New Zealand F1 Futures $10,000	February 24	Blenheim; New Zealand	Hard	(Czech Republic) Ivo Minář	(Switzerland) Stéphane Bohli (Japan) Jun Kato
Spain F4 Futures $10,000	February 24	Cartagena; Spain	Clay	(Spain) Iván Navarro	(United Kingdom) Miles Maclagan (France) Stéphane Robert
Nigeria F2 Futures $15,000	February 24	Benin; Nigeria	Hard	(Benin) Arnaud Segodo	(France) Xavier Audouy (Ivory Coast) Claude N'Goran
Portugal F4 Futures $10,000	February 24	Lisbon; Portugal	Clay	(Argentina) Juan Pablo Brzezicki	(Argentina) Juan Pablo Brzezicki (Argentina) Diego Junqueira

=== March ===
Tournament	Date	City	Surface	Singles champions	Doubles champions
New Zealand F2 Futures $10,000	March 3	Christchurch; New Zealand	Hard	(Japan) Jun Kato	(Switzerland) Stéphane Bohli (Japan) Jun Kato
New Zealand F3 Futures $10,000	March 10	North Shore; New Zealand	Hard	(South Africa) Dirk Stegmann	(South Africa) Johan Du Randt (New Zealand) Wesley Whitehouse
France F6 Futures $15,000	March 10	Lille; France	Hard (i)	(Italy) Stefano Pescosolido	(Germany) Philipp Kohlschreiber (Germany) Markus Wislsperger
Portugal F5 Futures $10,000	March 10	Faro; Portugal	Hard	(Greece) Konstantinos Economidis	(Spain) Guillermo García López (Spain) Santiago Ventura
France F7 Futures $15,000	March 17	Poitiers; France	Hard (i)	(France) Nicolas Mahut	(Switzerland) Yves Allegro (Italy) Daniele Bracciali
India F4 Futures $15,000	March 17	Mumbai; India	Hard	(Austria) Zbynek Mlynarik	(India) Harsh Mankad (India) Vishal Uppal
Portugal F6 Futures $10,000	March 17	Carcavelos; Portugal	Clay	(Spain) Nicolás Almagro	(Spain) Guillermo García López (Spain) Israel Matos Gil
France F8 Futures $15,000	March 24	Melun; France	Carpet (i)	(Netherlands) Peter Wessels	(Switzerland) Michael Lammer (Switzerland) Roman Valent
USA F6 Futures $15,000	March 24	Mobile; USA	Hard	(Republic of Ireland) Peter Clarke	(United States) Michael Joyce (United States) Kevin Kim
Australia F1 Futures $15,000	March 24	Burnie; Australia	Hard	(Israel) Dudi Sela	(Australia) Raphael Durek (Australia) Alun Jones
India F5 Futures $15,000	March 24	Kolkata; India	Hard	(Austria) Zbynek Mlynarik	(India) Harsh Mankad (India) Vishal Uppal
Portugal F7 Futures $10,000	March 24	Estoril; Portugal	Clay	(Spain) Nicolás Almagro	(Portugal) Emanuel Couto (Portugal) Bernardo Mota
Mexico F1 Futures $15,000	March 31	Naucalpan; Mexico	Hard	(Mexico) Daniel Garza	(Argentina) Juan Pablo Brzezicki (Argentina) Carlos Berlocq
Australia F2 Futures $15,000	March 31	Devonport; Australia	Hard	(Germany) Daniel Elsner	(Australia) Luke Bourgeois (Australia) Chris Guccione
Uzbekistan F1 Futures $15,000	March 31	Qarshi; Uzbekistan	Hard	(France) Rodolphe Cadart	(Czech Republic) Petr Dezort (Czech Republic) Jaroslav Levinský
USA F7 Futures $15,000	March 31	Pensacola; USA	Hard	(Argentina) Nicolás Todero	(United States) Huntley Montgomery (United States) Tripp Phillips
France F9 Futures $15,000	March 31	Saint-Brieuc; France	Clay (i)	(France) Olivier Patience	(France) Fabrice Betencourt (France) Édouard Roger-Vasselin
Italy F1 Futures $10,000	March 31	Rome; Italy	Clay	(Italy) Tomas Tenconi	(Hungary) Gergely Kisgyörgy (Italy) Giancarlo Petrazzuolo
Spain F5 Futures $10,000	March 31	Castellón; Spain	Clay	(Spain) Guillermo García López	(Spain) Diego Hipperdinger (Spain) Ferran Ventura-Martell
Qatar F1 Futures $15,000	March 31	Doha; Qatar	Hard	(Germany) Michael Berrer	(France) Benjamin Cassaigne (Netherlands) Rogier Wassen

=== April ===
Tournament	Date	City	Surface	Singles champions	Doubles champions
Mexico F2 Futures $15,000	April 7	Aguascalientes; Mexico	Clay	(Brazil) Marcos Daniel	(Germany) Frank Moser (Germany) Bernard Parun
Japan F1 Futures $10,000	April 7	Kofu; Japan	Carpet	(Japan) Takahiro Terachi	(New Zealand) Rob Cheyne (New Zealand) Mark Nielsen
USA F8 Futures $15,000	April 7	Little Rock; USA	Hard	(Argentina) Ignacio Hirigoyen	(Australia) Jay Gooding (Australia) Jordan Kerr
Uzbekistan F2 Futures $15,000	April 7	Guliston; Uzbekistan	Hard	(Switzerland) Stéphane Bohli	(Czech Republic) Petr Dezort (Czech Republic) Jaroslav Levinský
Greece F1 Futures $15,000	April 7	Syros; Greece	Hard	(Cyprus) Marcos Baghdatis	(Israel) Jonathan Erlich (Israel) Andy Ram
Italy F2 Futures $10,000	April 7	Frascati; Italy	Clay	(France) Xavier Pujo	(Hungary) Gergely Kisgyörgy (Italy) Giancarlo Petrazzuolo
Chile F1 Futures $10,000	April 7	Santiago; Chile	Clay	(Austria) Marko Neunteibl	(Argentina) Patricio Arquez (Argentina) Sebastián Decoud
Spain F6 Futures $10,000	April 7	Rocafort; Spain	Clay	(Spain) Germán Puentes	(France) Sebastien Lami (France) Dimitri Lorin
Qatar F2 Futures $15,000	April 7	Doha; Qatar	Hard	(France) Gary Lugassy	(United Kingdom) Jonathan Marray (United Kingdom) David Sherwood
Greece F2 Futures $15,000	April 14	Kalamata; Greece	Hard	(Sweden) Björn Rehnquist	(Romania) Florin Mergea (Romania) Horia Tecău
China F1 Futures $15,000	April 14	Taizhou; China, P.R.	Hard	(Chinese Taipei) Lu Yen-hsun	(China) Zhu Benqiang (China) Zeng Shaoxuan
USA F9 Futures $15,000	April 14	Elkin; USA	Hard	(Brazil) Josh Goffi	(Brazil) Josh Goffi (United States) Travis Parrott
Japan F2 Futures $10,000	April 14	Tokyo; Japan	Hard	(Japan) Tasuku Iwami	(New Zealand) Rob Cheyne (New Zealand) Mark Nielsen
Italy F3 Futures $10,000	April 14	Viterbo; Italy	Clay	(Italy) Stefano Pescosolido	(Russia) Igor Andreev (Hungary) Gergely Kisgyörgy
Chile F2 Futures $10,000	April 14	Viña del Mar; Chile	Clay	(Chile) Julio Peralta	(Chile) Juan Ignacio Cerda (Chile) Phillip Harboe
Spain F7 Futures $10,000	April 14	Vinaròs; Spain	Clay	(Spain) Nicolás Almagro	(Romania) Adrian Cruciat (Spain) Miguel Ángel López Jaén
Kuwait F1 Futures $10,000	April 21	Mishref; Kuwait	Hard	(Slovakia) Ivo Klec	(Sweden) Patrik Fredriksson (Sweden) Kalle Flygt
Japan F3 Futures $10,000	April 21	Kumamoto City; Japan	Hard	(South Korea) Yoon Yong-il	(Japan) Hiroki Kondo (Japan) Norikazu Sugiyama
Germany F1 Futures $10,000	April 21	Riemerling; Germany	Clay	(Sweden) Robert Lindstedt	(Sweden) Robert Lindstedt (Sweden) Fredrik Lovén
Algeria F1 Futures $10,000	April 21	Sidi Fredj; Algeria	Clay	(Slovakia) Boris Borgula	(Spain) David Cors (Spain) Gabriel Trujillo Soler
China F2 Futures $15,000	April 21	Taizhou; China, P.R.	Hard	(China) Zhu Benqiang	(China) Zhu Benqiang (China) Zeng Shaoxuan
Chile F3 Futures $10,000	April 21	Santiago; Chile	Clay	(Spain) David Marrero	(Argentina) Francisco Cabello (Chile) Adrián García
Spain F8 Futures $10,000	April 21	Jávea; Spain	Clay	(Spain) Francisco Fogués	(Spain) Javier García-Sintes (Spain) Germán Puentes
Italy F4 Futures $10,000	April 21	Bergamo; Italy	Clay	(Republic of Ireland) Peter Clarke	(Italy) Alessandro Da Col (Italy) Andrea Stoppini
Mexico F3 Futures $10,000	April 28	Guadalajara; Mexico	Clay	(Netherlands) Jean-Julien Rojer	(Brazil) Eduardo Bohrer (Brazil) Ronaldo Carvalho
Kuwait F2 Futures $10,000	April 28	Mishref; Kuwait	Hard	(Slovakia) Ivo Klec	(Romania) Florin Mergea (Romania) Horia Tecău
Jamaica F3 Futures $10,000	April 28	Montego Bay; Jamaica	Hard	(United States) Wayne Odesnik	(South Africa) Andrew Anderson (South Africa) W.P. Meyer
Germany F2 Futures $15,000	April 28	Esslingen; Germany	Clay	(Germany) Marcello Craca	(Sweden) Robert Lindstedt (Sweden) Fredrik Lovén
Algeria F2 Futures $10,000	April 28	Sonatrach; Algeria	Clay	(Morocco) Jalal Chafai	(Czech Republic) Dušan Karol (Czech Republic) Jaroslav Pospíšil
Uzbekistan F3 Futures $15,000	April 28	Andijan; Uzbekistan	Hard	(Switzerland) Marco Chiudinelli	(South Africa) Justin Bower (Switzerland) Marco Chiudinelli
Korea Rep. F1 Futures $15,000	April 28	Cheongju; Korea, Rep.	Clay	(Czech Republic) Jan Masik	(South Korea) Chung Hee-sung (South Korea) Chung Hee-seok
Hungary F1 Futures $15,000	April 28	Miskolc; Hungary	Clay	(Russia) Igor Andreev	(Hungary) Kornél Bardóczky (Hungary) Gergely Kisgyörgy
Great Britain F5 Futures $15,000	April 28	Bournemouth; Great Britain	Clay	(Czech Republic) Tomáš Berdych	(Czech Republic) Tomáš Berdych (Czech Republic) Michal Navrátil
Italy F5 Futures $10,000	April 28	Teramo; Italy	Clay	(Argentina) Guillermo Carry	(Poland) Bartłomiej Dąbrowski (Poland) Mariusz Fyrstenberg

=== May ===
Tournament	Date	City	Surface	Singles champions	Doubles champions
Great Britain F6 Futures $15,000	May 5	Edinburgh; Great Britain	Clay	(Australia) Todd Reid	(South Africa) Rik de Voest (Sweden) Marcus Sarstrand
Hungary F2 Futures $15,000	May 5	Hódmezővásárhely; Hungary	Clay	(Slovakia) Michal Mertiňák	(Hungary) Kornél Bardóczky (Hungary) Gergely Kisgyörgy
Algeria F3 Futures $10,000	May 5	Sidi Fredj; Algeria	Clay	(Algeria) Lamine Ouahab	(Czech Republic) Dušan Karol (Czech Republic) Jaroslav Pospíšil
Italy F6 Futures $10,000	May 5	Valdengo; Italy	Clay	(Brazil) Alexandre Simoni	(Finland) Janne Ojala (Brazil) Alexandre Simoni
Kuwait F3 Futures $10,000	May 5	Mishref; Kuwait	Hard	(Slovakia) Ivo Klec	(Romania) Florin Mergea (Romania) Horia Tecău
USA F10 Futures $10,000	May 5	Vero Beach; USA	Clay	(Canada) Simon Larose	(United States) K. J. Hippensteel (United States) Ryan Haviland
Germany F3 Futures $10,000	May 5	Arnsberg; Germany	Clay	(Netherlands) Edwin Kempes	(Germany) Benedikt Stronk (Germany) Marius Zay
Korea Rep. F2 Futures $15,000	May 5	Cheongju; Korea, Rep.	Clay	(South Korea) Kim Young-jun	(South Korea) Kim Young-jun (South Korea) Yoon Yong-il
Mexico F4 Futures $10,000	May 5	Aguascalientes; Mexico	Hard	(Brazil) Ronaldo Carvalho	(Colombia) Alejandro Falla (Brazil) Bruno Soares
Uzbekistan F4 Futures $15,000	May 5	Namangan; Uzbekistan	Hard	(Cyprus) Marcos Baghdatis	(South Africa) Justin Bower (Pakistan) Aisam-ul-Haq Qureshi
Jamaica F4 Futures $10,000	May 5	Montego Bay; Jamaica	Hard	(Argentina) Juan Mónaco	(United Kingdom) James Auckland (United States) Nenad Toroman
Jamaica F5 Futures $10,000	May 12	Montego Bay; Jamaica	Hard	(Canada) Frédéric Niemeyer	(South Africa) Andrew Anderson (South Africa) W.P. Meyer
Germany F4 Futures $15,000	May 12	Neckarau; Germany	Clay	(Germany) Marcello Craca	(Germany) Markus Bayer (Germany) Florian Jeschonek
Mexico F5 Futures $10,000	May 12	Ciudad Obregón; Mexico	Hard	(Colombia) Pablo González	(Mexico) Guillermo Carter (Mexico) Santiago González
USA F11 Futures $10,000	May 12	Orange Park; USA	Clay	(Brazil) Pedro Braga	(United States) Brian Baker (United States) Phillip Simmonds
Italy F7 Futures $10,000	May 12	Pavia; Italy	Clay	(Italy) Tomas Tenconi	(Italy) Flavio Cipolla (Italy) Daniele Giorgini
Korea Rep. F3 Futures $15,000	May 12	Seogwipo; Korea, Rep.	Hard	(Japan) Takahiro Terachi	(South Korea) Kim Young-jun (South Korea) Yoon Yong-il
Italy F8 Futures $10,000	May 19	Verona; Italy	Clay	(Italy) Tomas Tenconi	(Italy) Gianluca Bazzica (Russia) Philipp Mukhometov
Korea Rep. F4 Futures $15,000	May 19	Seogwipo; Korea, Rep.	Hard	(Sweden) Filip Prpic	(South Korea) Im Sung-ho (South Korea) Kwon Oh-hee
Jamaica F6 Futures $10,000	May 19	Montego Bay; Jamaica	Hard	(Russia) Pavel Ivanov	(Canada) Simon Larose (United States) Kiantki Thomas
Morocco F1 Futures $10,000	May 19	Agadir; Morocco	Clay	(Ivory Coast) Valentin Sanon	(Tunisia) Walid Jallali (Tunisia) Malek Jaziri
USA F12 Futures $10,000	May 19	Tampa; USA	Clay	(Serbia and Montenegro) Dušan Vemić	(United States) K. J. Hippensteel (United States) Ryan Haviland
Colombia F1A Futures $15,000	May 19	Cali; Colombia	Clay	(Brazil) Thiago Alves	(United States) Mirko Pehar (Colombia) Michael Quintero
Colombia F1B Futures $15,000	May 26	Pereira; Colombia	Clay	(Colombia) Alejandro Falla	(Brazil) Marcelo Melo (Brazil) Bruno Soares
Morocco F2 Futures $10,000	May 26	Marrakesh; Morocco	Clay	(Andorra) Laurent Recouderc	(France) Fabrice Betencourt (France) Jean-Michel Pequery
Czech Rep. F1 Futures $10,000	May 26	Most; Czech Republic	Clay	(Czech Republic) Jan Masik	(Czech Republic) Lukáš Dlouhý (Czech Republic) David Miketa
Germany F5 Futures $15,000	May 26	Friesenheim; Germany	Clay	(France) Julien Jeanpierre	(Sweden) Daniel Andersson (Belgium) Stefan Wauters

=== June ===
Tournament	Date	City	Surface	Singles champions	Doubles champions
Germany F6 Futures $10,000	June 2	Ludwigshafen; Germany	Clay	(Germany) Lars Uebel	(Argentina) Francisco Cabello (Argentina) Dario Perez
Czech Rep. F2 Futures $10,000	June 2	Karlovy Vary; Czech Republic	Clay	(Czech Republic) Radim Žitko	(Czech Republic) Daniel Lustig (Czech Republic) Karel Triska
Morocco F3 Futures $10,000	June 2	Rabat; Morocco	Clay	(Spain) Diego Hipperdinger	(Tunisia) Walid Jallali (Morocco) Talal Ouahabi
USA F13 Futures $10,000	June 2	Yuba City; USA	Hard	(United States) K. J. Hippensteel	(United States) Rylan Rizza (United States) Travis Rettenmaier
Slovenia F1 Futures $10,000	June 2	Kranj; Slovenia	Clay	(France) Stéphane Robert	(Croatia) Ivan Cerović (Serbia and Montenegro) Aleksander Slovic
Mexico F6 Futures $10,000	June 2	Obregón; Mexico		(Brazil) Júlio Silva	(Mexico) Bruno Echagaray (Mexico) Santiago González
Spain F9 Futures $15,000	June 2	La Palma; Spain	Hard	(France) Marc Bauer	(Russia) Teymuraz Gabashvili (Russia) Alexander Pavlioutchenkov
Spain F10 Futures $10,000	June 9	Tenerife; Spain	Hard	(Russia) Teymuraz Gabashvili	(Australia) Sadik Kadir (Italy) Stefano Mocci
Netherlands F1 Futures $10,000	June 9	Amsterdam; Netherlands	Clay		
Portugal F8 Futures $10,000	June 9	Lisbon; Portugal	Clay	(Spain) Nicolás Almagro	(India) Harsh Mankad (Portugal) Leonardo Tavares
Czech Rep. F3 Futures $10,000	June 9	Jablonec nad Nisou; Czech Republic	Clay	(Czech Republic) Tomáš Cakl	(Czech Republic) Lukáš Dlouhý (Czech Republic) David Miketa
Finland F1 Futures $10,000	June 9	Savitaipale; Finland	Clay	(Finland) Timo Nieminen	(Italy) Fabio Colangelo (Italy) Alessandro Motti
Slovenia F2 Futures $10,000	June 9	Maribor; Slovenia	Clay	(Argentina) Ignacio González King	(Slovenia) Rok Jarc (Slovenia) Marko Por
USA F14 Futures $10,000	June 9	Sunnyvale; USA	Hard	(United States) Matías Boeker	(United States) Lester Cook (United States) Ryan Newport
Canada F1 Futures $10,000	June 9	Mississauga; Canada	Hard	(Australia) Rameez Junaid	(United States) Trace Fielding (Canada) Andrew Nisker
Serbia & Montenegro F1 Futures $10,000	June 9	Pančevo; Serbia & Montenegro	Clay	(Bulgaria) Ivaylo Traykov	(Argentina) Federico Cardinali (Italy) Manuel Jorquera
Mexico F7 Futures $10,000	June 9	Loreto; Mexico		(Mexico) Santiago González	(Brazil) Thiago Alves (Brazil) Bruno Soares
Mexico F8 Futures $10,000	June 16	Los Cabos; Mexico		(Brazil) Franco Ferreiro	(Mexico) Guillermo Carter (Mexico) Bruno Echagaray
Serbia & Montenegro F2 Futures $10,000	June 16	Belgrade; Serbia & Montenegro	Clay	(Austria) Philipp Müllner	(Argentina) Federico Cardinali (Italy) Manuel Jorquera
Romania F1A Futures $10,000	June 16	Bucharest; Romania	Clay	(Austria) Johannes Ager	(Romania) Ionuț Moldovan (Romania) Dinu Pescariu
Germany F7 Futures $15,000	June 16	Kassel; Germany	Clay	(Czech Republic) Petr Kralert	(Indonesia) Peter Handoyo (Indonesia) Suwandi
Canada F2 Futures $10,000	June 16	Montreal; Canada	Hard	(Canada) Frank Dancevic	(United States) Huntley Montgomery (United States) Ryan Sachire
Finland F2 Futures $10,000	June 16	Vierumäki; Finland	Clay	(Finland) Timo Nieminen	(Sweden) Rickard Holmstrom (Sweden) Ola Jonsson
Slovenia F3 Futures $10,000	June 16	Koper; Slovenia	Clay	(Slovakia) Ladislav Švarc	(Slovenia) Tomaz Berendijas (Slovenia) Boštjan Ošabnik
USA F15 Futures $10,000	June 16	Chico; USA	Hard	(United States) Matías Boeker	(United States) Rajeev Ram (United States) Brian Wilson
France F10 Futures $15,000	June 16	Blois; France	Clay	(Morocco) Mounir El Aarej	(Argentina) Gustavo Cavallaro (Argentina) Máximo González
Portugal F9 Futures $10,000	June 16	Lisbon; Portugal	Clay	(Spain) Nicolás Almagro	(India) Harsh Mankad (Portugal) Leonardo Tavares
Spain F11 Futures $15,000	June 16	Lanzarote; Spain	Hard	(Spain) Santiago Ventura	(Slovakia) Ivo Klec (Australia) Domenic Marafiote
Spain F12 Futures $10,000	June 23	Gran Canaria; Spain	Clay	(Spain) Roberto Menéndez	(Slovakia) Ivo Klec (Australia) Domenic Marafiote
Netherlands F2 Futures $15,000	June 23	Alkmaar; Netherlands	Clay	(Cyprus) Marcos Baghdatis	(Japan) Jun Kato (Belgium) Stefan Wauters
Romania F1 Futures $10,000	June 23	Bacău; Romania	Clay	(Romania) Victor Ioniță	(Romania) George Cosac (Romania) Victor Ioniță
Portugal F10 Futures $10,000	June 23	Lisbon; Portugal	Clay	(France) Gilles Simon	(Portugal) Tiago Godinho (Portugal) António van Grichen
Germany F8 Futures $10,000	June 23	Leun; Germany	Clay	(Germany) Sebastian Jaeger	(Germany) Markus Dickhardt (Germany) Philipp Marx
France F11 Futures $15,000	June 23	Toulon; France	Clay	(France) Julien Jeanpierre	(Argentina) Brian Dabul (Argentina) Gustavo Marcaccio
USA F16 Futures $10,000	June 23	Auburn; USA	Hard	(United States) KC Corkery	(United States) John Paul Fruttero (United States) Bobby Reynolds
USA F17 Futures $10,000	June 23	Williamsville; USA	Clay	(Russia) Dmitri Sitak	(France) Gary Lugassy (Colombia) Michael Quintero
Canada F3 Futures $10,000	June 23	Lachine; Canada	Hard	(United States) Ryan Sachire	(United States) Keith From (United States) Trace Fielding
Mexico F9 Futures $15,000	June 23	Chetumal, Quintana Roo; Mexico	Hard	(Brazil) Júlio Silva	(Japan) Toshihide Matsui (Japan) Michihisa Onoda
Estonia F1A Futures $10,000	June 23	Tallinn; Estonia	Clay	(Finland) Janne Ojala	(Norway) Stian Boretti (Latvia) Andis Juška
Serbia & Montenegro F3 Futures $10,000	June 23	Belgrade; Serbia & Montenegro	Clay	(Serbia and Montenegro) Novak Djokovic	(Hungary) Kornél Bardóczky (Czech Republic) Jaroslav Pospíšil
Mexico F10 Futures $10,000	June 30	Acapulco; Mexico	Clay	(Brazil) Lucas Engel	(Mexico) Rodrigo Echagaray (Mexico) Bruno Echagaray
USA F18 Futures $10,000	June 30	Pittsburgh; USA	Clay	(Colombia) Michael Quintero	(South Africa) Justin Bower (South Africa) Shaun Rudman
Georgia F1 Futures $15,000	June 30	Tbilisi; Georgia	Clay	(Russia) Teymuraz Gabashvili	(Czech Republic) Jaroslav Pospíšil (Czech Republic) Radim Žitko
Romania F2 Futures $10,000	June 30	Constanța; Romania	Clay	(France) Guillaume Legat	(Romania) George Cosac (Romania) Victor Ioniță
Netherlands F3 Futures $15,000	June 30	Heerhugowaard; Netherlands	Clay	(Belgium) Stefan Wauters	(Netherlands) Bart Beks (Netherlands) Remco Pondman

=== July ===
Tournament	Date	City	Surface	Singles champions	Doubles champions
Spain F13 Futures $15,000	July 7	Alicante; Spain	Clay	(Spain) Nicolás Almagro	(Spain) Guillermo García López (Spain) Santiago Ventura
Ecuador F1 Futures $10,000	July 7	Guayaquil; Ecuador	Hard	(Argentina) Sebastián Decoud	(Argentina) Sebastián Decoud (Colombia) Pablo González
France F12 Futures $15,000	July 7	Bourg-en-Bresse; France	Clay	(France) Jean-Christophe Faurel	(France) Jérôme Hanquez (France) Régis Lavergne
Austria F1 Futures $10,000	July 7	Telfs; Austria	Clay	(Austria) Daniel Köllerer	(Czech Republic) David Novak (Czech Republic) Martin Vacek
USA F19 Futures $10,000	July 7	Peoria; USA	Clay	(Bosnia and Herzegovina) Amer Delić	(Brazil) Eduardo Bohrer (Brazil) Márcio Carlsson
Georgia F2 Futures $15,000	July 7	Tbilisi; Georgia	Clay	(Russia) Teymuraz Gabashvili	(Czech Republic) Dušan Karol (Czech Republic) Roman Vögeli
Romania F3 Futures $10,000	July 7	Lasi; Romania	Clay	(Romania) Ionuț Moldovan	(Romania) Ionuț Moldovan (Romania) Gabriel Moraru
Romania F4 Futures $10,000	July 14	Craiova; Romania	Clay	(Romania) Ionuț Moldovan	(Romania) Adrian Barbu (Romania) Cătălin-Ionuț Gârd
Serbia & Montenegro F4 Futures $10,000	July 14	Belgrade; Serbia & Montenegro	Clay	(France) Stéphane Robert	(Bulgaria) Todor Enev (Bulgaria) Radoslav Lukaev
Ecuador F2 Futures $10,000	July 14	Guayaquil; Ecuador	Clay	(Ecuador) Carlos Avellán	(Mexico) Juan Manuel Elizondo (Bolivia) Javier Taborga
Austria F2 Futures $10,000	July 14	Kramsach; Austria	Clay	(Austria) Marko Neunteibl	(Austria) Daniel Köllerer (Austria) Marko Neunteibl
France F13 Futures $10,000	July 14	Saint-Gervais-les-Bains; France	Clay	(France) Bertrand Contzler	(Italy) Luca Bonati (France) Nicolas Tourte
Spain F14 Futures $15,000	July 14	Elche; Spain	Clay	(Spain) Miguel Ángel López Jaén	(China) Zhu Benqiang (China) Zeng Shaoxuan
Spain F15 Futures $10,000	July 21	Gandia; Spain	Clay	(Spain) Mario Munoz-Bejarano	(Spain) Daniel Muñoz de la Nava (Spain) Jordi Marse-Vidri
France F14 Futures $15,000	July 21	Valescure; France	Hard	(France) Benjamin Cassaigne	(France) Jean-Baptiste Robin (France) Nicolas Tourte
USA F21 Futures $10,000	July 21	Joplin; USA	Hard	(United States) Todd Widom	(United States) Jeremy Wurtzman (United States) Sam Warburg
Ecuador F3 Futures $10,000	July 21	Villamil; Ecuador	Hard	(Argentina) Sebastián Decoud	(Argentina) Sebastián Decoud (Bolivia) Javier Taborga
Serbia & Montenegro F5 Futures $10,000	July 21	Belgrade; Serbia & Montenegro	Clay	(France) Stéphane Robert	(Egypt) Mohamed Mamoun (France) Stéphane Robert
Romania F5 Futures $10,000	July 21	Bucharest; Romania		(Romania) Răzvan Sabău	(Thailand) Sanchai Ratiwatana (Thailand) Sonchat Ratiwatana
Romania F6 Futures $10,000	July 28	Oradea; Romania	Clay	(Romania) Gabriel Moraru	(Italy) Alberto Brizzi (Sweden) Tobias Steinel-Hansson
Serbia & Montenegro F6 Futures $10,000	July 28	Belgrade; Serbia & Montenegro	Clay	(France) Nicolas Renavand	(Czech Republic) Dušan Karol (Austria) Martin Slanar
Austria F3 Futures $10,000	July 28	Seefeld; Austria	Clay	(Czech Republic) Michal Navrátil	(Austria) Ingo Neumüller (Austria) Tomas Weindorfer
USA F22 Futures $10,000	July 28	Decatur; USA	Hard	(United States) K. J. Hippensteel	(United States) K. J. Hippensteel (United Kingdom) Matthew Hanlin
Spain F16 Futures $10,000	July 28	Dénia; Spain	Clay	(Spain) José Antonio Sánchez de Luna	(Spain) Daniel Muñoz de la Nava (Spain) Jordi Marse-Vidri

=== August ===
Tournament	Date	City	Surface	Singles champions	Doubles champions
Great Britain F7 Futures $15,000	August 4	Wrexham; Great Britain	Hard	(United Kingdom) Chris Lewis	(United Kingdom) Mark Hilton (United Kingdom) Jonathan Marray
Spain F17 Futures $10,000	August 4	Xàtiva; Spain	Clay	(Spain) Iván Navarro	(China) Zhu Benqiang (China) Zeng Shaoxuan
Egypt F1 Futures $10,000	August 4	Cairo; Egypt	Clay	(Bulgaria) Yordan Kanev	(Egypt) Karim Maamoun (Egypt) Mohamed Mamoun
USA F23 Futures $10,000	August 4	Godfrey; USA	Hard	(Australia) Domenic Marafiote	(United States) Troy Hahn (United States) Hamid Mirzadeh
Latvia F1 Futures $10,000	August 4	Jūrmala; Latvia	Clay	(Sweden) Daniel Klemetz	(Poland) Radosław Nijaki (Poland) Filip Urban
Iran F1 Futures $15,000	August 4	Tehran; Iran	Clay	(Germany) Sebastian Fitz	(Lebanon) Patrick Chucri (Sweden) Alexander Hartman
Romania F7 Futures $10,000	August 4	Timișoara; Romania	Clay	(Spain) Alejandro Vargas-Aboy	(Thailand) Sanchai Ratiwatana (Thailand) Sonchat Ratiwatana
Brazil F3A Futures $10,000	August 4	Guarulhos; Brazil	Clay	(Brazil) Eduardo Bohrer	(Brazil) Daniel Melo (Brazil) Marcelo Melo
Romania F8 Futures $10,000	August 11	Bucharest; Romania	Clay	(Romania) Ionuț Moldovan	(Romania) Ionuț Moldovan (Romania) Gabriel Moraru
Iran F2 Futures $15,000	August 11	Tehran; Iran	Clay	(Sweden) Michael Ryderstedt	(Lebanon) Patrick Chucri (Sweden) Alexander Hartman
Croatia F3 Futures $10,000	August 11	Našice; Croatia	Clay	(Italy) Paolo Lorenzi	(Germany) Andreas Beck (France) Josselin Ouanna
Nigeria F3 Futures $15,000	August 11	Lagos; Nigeria	Hard	(New Zealand) Wesley Whitehouse	(India) Mustafa Ghouse (Ivory Coast) Claude N'Goran
USA F24 Futures $10,000	August 11	Kenosha; USA	Hard	(South Africa) Raven Klaasen	(Australia) Adam Kennedy (Australia) Domenic Marafiote
Lithuania F1 Futures $10,000	August 11	Vilnius; Lithuania	Clay	(Finland) Janne Ojala	(Sweden) Rickard Holmstrom (Sweden) Daniel Klemetz
Russia F1 Futures $15,000	August 11	Sergiyev Posad; Russia	Clay	(Andorra) Laurent Recouderc	(Russia) Dmitri Sitak (New Zealand) Artem Sitak
Tunisia F1 Futures $10,000	August 11	Carthage; Tunisia	Clay	(Tunisia) Walid Jallali	(Monaco) Thomas Oger (France) Nicolas Tourte
Brazil F3 Futures $10,000	August 11	Porto Alegre; Brazil	Clay	(Brazil) Júlio Silva	(Brazil) Eduardo Bohrer (Chile) Paul Capdeville
Egypt F2 Futures $10,000	August 11	Cairo; Egypt	Clay	(Slovakia) Tomas Janci	(Czech Republic) Michal Navrátil (Czech Republic) Jaroslav Pospíšil
Spain F18 Futures $15,000	August 11	Vigo; Spain	Clay	(Spain) Diego Hipperdinger	(China) Zhu Benqiang (China) Zeng Shaoxuan
Great Britain F8 Futures $15,000	August 11	London; Great Britain	Hard	(Italy) Marco Pedrini	(United Kingdom) Dan Kiernan (United Kingdom) David Sherwood
Romania F9 Futures $10,000	August 18	Brașov; Romania		(Romania) Răzvan Sabău	(Hungary) László Fonó (Hungary) Sebő Kiss
Spain F19 Futures $15,000	August 18	Irun; Spain	Clay	(Spain) Marc Fornell Mestres	(China) Zhu Benqiang (China) Zeng Shaoxuan
Russia F2 Futures $15,000	August 18	Balashikha; Russia	Clay	(Andorra) Laurent Recouderc	(Russia) Mikhail Elgin (Russia) Dmitry Vlasov
Tunisia F2 Futures $10,000	August 18	Mégrine; Tunisia	Hard	(Monaco) Thomas Oger	(Monaco) Thomas Oger (France) Nicolas Tourte
Brazil F4 Futures $15,000	August 18	Goiânia; Brazil	Hard	(Brazil) Franco Ferreiro	(Brazil) Eduardo Bohrer (Chile) Paul Capdeville
Egypt F3 Futures $10,000	August 18	Cairo; Egypt	Clay	(Czech Republic) Jaroslav Pospíšil	(Slovakia) Tomas Janci (Slovakia) Michal Varsanyi
Poland F1 Futures $10,000	August 18	Poznań; Poland	Clay	(Finland) Kim Tiilikainen	(Netherlands) Bart Beks (Czech Republic) Petr Dezort
Argentina F1 Futures $10,000	August 18	Buenos Aires; Argentina	Clay	(Argentina) Juan Mónaco	(Argentina) Carlos Berlocq (Argentina) Brian Dabul
Croatia F4 Futures $10,000	August 18	Čakovec; Croatia	Clay	(Spain) Ferran Ventura-Martell	(Croatia) Ivan Stelko (Croatia) Vilim Visak
Netherlands F4 Futures $15,000	August 18	Enschede; Netherlands	Clay	(Belgium) Stefan Wauters	(Sweden) Robert Lindstedt (Romania) Gabriel Trifu
Lithuania F2 Futures $10,000	August 18	Šiauliai; Lithuania	Clay	(Norway) Stian Boretti	(Finland) Tommi Lenho (Lithuania) Daniel Lencina-Ribes
Nigeria F4 Futures $15,000	August 18	Lagos; Nigeria	Hard	(Zimbabwe) Genius Chidzikwe	(South Africa) W.P. Meyer (New Zealand) Wesley Whitehouse
Croatia F5 Futures $10,000	August 25	Zagreb; Croatia	Clay	(Austria) Konstantin Gruber	(Spain) Esteban Carril (Croatia) Luka Kutanjac
Tunisia F3 Futures $10,000	August 25	El Menzah; Tunisia	Hard	(India) Sunil-Kumar Sipaeya	(India) Ajay Ramaswami (India) Sunil-Kumar Sipaeya
Indonesia F1 Futures $15,000	August 25	Jakarta; Indonesia	Hard	(India) Rohan Bopanna	(Australia) Sadik Kadir (Austria) Martin Slanar
Romania F10 Futures $10,000	August 25	Brașov; Romania	Clay	(Romania) Gabriel Moraru	(Romania) Ionuț Moldovan (Romania) Gabriel Moraru
Brazil F5 Futures $10,000	August 25	Fortaleza; Brazil	Hard	(Brazil) Marcos Daniel	(Brazil) Alexandre Bonatto (Brazil) Felipe Lemos
Russia F3 Futures $15,000	August 25	Zhukovsky; Russia	Clay	(Russia) Teymuraz Gabashvili	(Belarus) Vitali Chvets (Russia) Alexey Sergeev
Argentina F2 Futures $10,000	August 25	Buenos Aires; Argentina	Clay	(Argentina) Carlos Berlocq	(Italy) Enzo Artoni (Argentina) Gustavo Marcaccio
Netherlands F5 Futures $15,000	August 25	Alphen aan den Rijn; Netherlands	Clay	(Germany) Denis Gremelmayr	(Sweden) Robert Lindstedt (Germany) Lars Uebel
Poland F2 Futures $10,000	August 25	Sopot; Poland	Clay	(Spain) Javier García-Sintes	(United Kingdom) Richard Brooks (Spain) Javier García-Sintes
Mexico F12 Futures $10,000	August 25	Tuxtla Gutiérrez, Chiapas; Mexico	Hard	(United States) Lesley Joseph	(United States) Marcus Fluitt (United States) Lesley Joseph
Spain F20 Futures $15,000	August 25	Santander; Spain	Clay	(Spain) Santiago Ventura	(Spain) Miguel Ángel López Jaén (Spain) Germán Puentes

=== September ===
Tournament	Date	City	Surface	Singles champions	Doubles champions
Spain F21 Futures $15,000	September 1	Oviedo; Spain	Clay	(Spain) Gabriel Trujillo Soler	(Spain) Roberto Menéndez (Spain) Gabriel Trujillo Soler
Mexico F13 Futures $10,000	September 1	Celaya; Mexico	Hard	(United States) Huntley Montgomery	(United States) Keith From (United States) Trace Fielding
Japan F6 Futures $15,000	September 1	Kashiwa; Japan	Hard	(Chinese Taipei) Lu Yen-hsun	(United States) Doug Bohaboy (New Zealand) Mark Nielsen
Jamaica F7 Futures $10,000	September 1	Montego Bay; Jamaica	Hard	(United States) Wayne Odesnik	(United States) Andrew Carlson (United States) Trevor Spracklin
Argentina F3 Futures $10,000	September 1	Buenos Aires; Argentina	Clay	(Argentina) Carlos Berlocq	(Argentina) Gustavo Marcaccio (Argentina) Patricio Rudi
Indonesia F2 Futures $15,000	September 1	Jakarta; Indonesia	Hard	(Chinese Taipei) Jimmy Wang	(Thailand) Sanchai Ratiwatana (Thailand) Sonchat Ratiwatana
Poland F3 Futures $10,000	September 1	Wrocław; Poland		(Czech Republic) Tomas Jecminek	(Czech Republic) Petr Dezort (Czech Republic) Tomas Jecminek
Slovak Rep. F1 Futures $10,000	September 8	Žilina; Slovakia	Clay	(Austria) Marko Neunteibl	(Austria) Konstantin Gruber (Austria) Marko Neunteibl
Jamaica F8 Futures $10,000	September 8	Montego Bay; Jamaica	Hard	(Venezuela) Kepler Orellana	(Sweden) Jacob Adaktusson (Chile) Juan Ignacio Cerda
Mexico F14 Futures $10,000	September 8	Querétaro; Mexico	Hard	(Argentina) Gustavo Marcaccio	(Mexico) Bruno Echagaray (United States) Huntley Montgomery
Japan F7 Futures $15,000	September 8	Saitama; Japan	Hard	(Japan) Takahiro Terachi	(Japan) Kentaro Masuda (Japan) Takahiro Terachi
France F15 Futures $15,000	September 8	Bagnères-de-Bigorre; France	Hard	(Slovakia) Igor Zelenay	(United Kingdom) Jamie Delgado (United Kingdom) Chris Lewis
Spain F22 Futures $10,000	September 8	Madrid; Spain	Hard	(Spain) Tati Rascón	(Spain) Esteban Carril (Spain) Santiago Ventura
Bolivia F1 Futures $15,000	September 8	Santa Cruz; Bolivia	Clay	(Argentina) Juan Mónaco	(Germany) Sebastian Jaeger (Brazil) Ricardo Schlachter
USA F25 Futures $10,000	September 8	Claremont; USA	Hard	(United States) Glenn Weiner	(United States) KC Corkery (United States) James Pade
USA F26 Futures $10,000	September 15	Costa Mesa; USA	Hard	(Venezuela) Jimy Szymanski	(United States) Mirko Pehar (United States) Nenad Toroman
Great Britain F9 Futures $10,000	September 15	Sunderland; Great Britain	Hard (i)	(United Kingdom) Jonathan Marray	(United Kingdom) Mark Hilton (United Kingdom) Jonathan Marray
Sweden F1 Futures $15,000	September 15	Gothenburg; Sweden	Hard (i)	(Sweden) Joachim Johansson	(Sweden) Mathias Hellström (Sweden) Fredrik Lovén
France F16 Futures $15,000	September 15	Mulhouse; France	Hard (i)	(France) Jean-Michel Pequery	(France) Gary Lugassy (France) Jean-Michel Pequery
Bolivia F2 Futures $15,000	September 15	La Paz; Bolivia	Clay	(Colombia) Pablo González	(Colombia) Pablo González (Bolivia) Javier Taborga
Italy F9 Futures $15,000	September 15	Oristano; Italy	Hard	(Italy) Uros Vico	(Italy) Daniele Giorgini (Italy) Stefano Mocci
Hungary F3 Futures $15,000	September 15	Kaposvár; Hungary	Clay	(Spain) Gabriel Trujillo Soler	(Spain) Germán Puentes (Spain) Gabriel Trujillo Soler
Kenya F1 Futures $10,000	September 15	Mombasa; Kenya	Hard	(New Zealand) Wesley Whitehouse	(South Africa) W.P. Meyer (New Zealand) Wesley Whitehouse
Jamaica F9 Futures $10,000	September 15	Montego Bay; Jamaica	Hard	(France) Gilles Simon	(Germany) Dustin Brown (Jamaica) Ryan Russell
Spain F23 Futures $15,000	September 15	Móstoles; Spain	Hard	(Spain) Marcos Jimenez-Letrado	(Spain) Miguel Ángel López Jaén (Spain) Santiago Ventura
Hungary F4 Futures $15,000	September 22	Sopron; Hungary	Clay	(Austria) Marko Neunteibl	(Czech Republic) David Novak (Czech Republic) Martin Vacek
Spain F24 Futures $15,000	September 22	Madrid; Spain	Hard	(Bulgaria) Todor Enev	(Spain) Esteban Carril (Spain) Santiago Ventura
Croatia F6 Futures $10,000	September 22	Vis; Croatia	Hard	(Slovenia) Marko Tkalec	(Slovenia) Boštjan Ošabnik (Slovenia) Marko Tkalec
Rwanda F1 Futures $10,000	September 22	Kigali; Rwanda	Clay	(Czech Republic) Jaroslav Pospíšil	(Czech Republic) Dušan Karol (Czech Republic) Jaroslav Pospíšil
Italy F10 Futures $15,000	September 22	Selargius; Italy	Hard	(Italy) Uros Vico	(Italy) Alessandro Motti (Italy) Uros Vico
Sweden F2 Futures $15,000	September 22	Gothenburg; Sweden	Hard (i)	(Finland) Timo Nieminen	(Sweden) Mathias Hellström (Sweden) Fredrik Lovén
France F17 Futures $15,000	September 22	Plaisir; France	Hard (i)	(France) Jean-Michel Pequery	(United States) Eric Butorac (Serbia and Montenegro) Petar Popović
Great Britain F10 Futures $10,000	September 22	Glasgow; Great Britain	Hard (i)	(United Kingdom) Andy Murray	(United Kingdom) Dan Kiernan (United Kingdom) David Sherwood
USA F27 Futures $10,000	September 22	Ojai; USA	Hard	(Venezuela) Jimy Szymanski	(France) Julien Cassaigne (Brazil) Bruno Soares
Chile F4 Futures $10,000	September 29	Santiago; Chile	Clay	(Argentina) Edgardo Massa	(Argentina) Diego Hartfield (Argentina) Patricio Rudi
France F18 Futures $15,000	September 29	Nevers; France	Hard (i)	(France) Jean-Michel Pequery	(United States) Eric Butorac (Serbia and Montenegro) Petar Popović
Mexico F15 Futures $10,000	September 29	Coatzacoalcos; Mexico	Hard	(Argentina) Gustavo Marcaccio	
Great Britain F11 Futures $15,000	September 29	Edinburgh; Great Britain	Hard (i)	(United Kingdom) David Sherwood	(United Kingdom) Dan Kiernan (United Kingdom) David Sherwood
USA F27A Futures $10,000	September 29	Laguna Niguel; USA	Hard	(Venezuela) Jimy Szymanski	(United States) Scott Lipsky (United States) David Martin
Rwanda F2 Futures $10,000	September 29	Kigali; Rwanda	Clay	(New Zealand) Wesley Whitehouse	(Czech Republic) Dušan Karol (Czech Republic) Jaroslav Pospíšil
Croatia F7 Futures $10,000	September 29	Hvar; Croatia	Clay	(Romania) Gabriel Moraru	(Germany) Sebastian Jaeger (Sweden) Robert Lindstedt
Sweden F3 Futures $10,000	September 29	Stockholm; Sweden	Indoor		
Spain F25 Futures $15,000	September 29	Martos; Spain	Hard	(Spain) Marcel Granollers	(Romania) Adrian Cruciat (Bulgaria) Todor Enev

=== October ===
Tournament	Date	City	Surface	Singles champions	Doubles champions
Spain F26 Futures $10,000	October 6	El Ejido; Spain	Hard	(Bulgaria) Todor Enev	(Spain) Rafael Moreno-Negrin (Germany) Lars Uebel
Croatia F8 Futures $10,000	October 6	Novalja; Croatia	Clay	(Spain) Germán Puentes	(Spain) Javier García-Sintes (Spain) Germán Puentes
Colombia F1 Futures $15,000	October 6	Medellín; Colombia	Clay	(Argentina) Carlos Berlocq	(Argentina) Sebastián Decoud (Bolivia) Javier Taborga
France F19 Futures $10,000	October 6	Sarreguemines; France	Hard (i)	(France) Gary Lugassy	(France) Gary Lugassy (France) Julien Mathieu
Greece F3 Futures $10,000	October 6	Athens; Greece	Clay	(Greece) Konstantinos Economidis	(Germany) Christian Grunes (Netherlands) Melle van Gemerden
Chile F5 Futures $10,000	October 6	Santiago; Chile	Clay	(Argentina) Diego Hartfield	(Argentina) Brian Dabul (Argentina) Damián Patriarca
Mexico F16 Futures $10,000	October 6	Torreón, Coahuila; Mexico	Hard	(Mexico) Miguel Gallardo Valles	(Brazil) Alexandre Bonatto (Brazil) Marcelo Melo
USA F28 Futures $15,000	October 13	Lubbock; USA	Hard	(Serbia and Montenegro) Dušan Vemić	(United States) Andres Pedroso (Argentina) Nicolás Todero
Mexico F17 Futures $10,000	October 13	Monterrey; Mexico	Hard	(Brazil) Marcelo Melo	(Brazil) Franco Ferreiro (Mexico) Eduardo Magadan-Castro
Greece F4 Futures $10,000	October 13	Thessaloniki; Greece	Clay	(Greece) Konstantinos Economidis	(Greece) Lefteris Alexiou (Greece) Alexandros Jakupovic
France F20 Futures $10,000	October 13	Saint-Dizier; France	Hard (i)	(France) Thomas Dupré	(Italy) Flavio Cipolla (Italy) Simone Vagnozzi
Chile F6 Futures $10,000	October 13	Santiago; Chile	Clay	(Chile) Phillip Harboe	(Chile) Juan Ignacio Cerda (Chile) Phillip Harboe
Jamaica F10 Futures $10,000	October 13	Montego Bay; Jamaica	Hard	(Paraguay) Francisco Rodríguez	(United Kingdom) Dan Kiernan (United Kingdom) David Sherwood
Colombia F2 Futures $15,000	October 13	Bogotá; Colombia	Clay	(Colombia) Alejandro Falla	(Colombia) Alejandro Falla (Colombia) Carlos Salamanca
Croatia F9 Futures $10,000	October 13	Veli Lošinj; Croatia	Clay	(United Kingdom) Alan Mackin	(Austria) Philipp Müllner (Austria) Herbert Wiltschnig
Nigeria F5 Futures $15,000	October 20	Lagos; Nigeria	Hard	(New Zealand) Wesley Whitehouse	(South Africa) W.P. Meyer (New Zealand) Wesley Whitehouse
Colombia F3 Futures $15,000	October 20	Bogotá; Colombia	Clay		
Argentina F4 Futures $10,000	October 20	Mendoza; Argentina	Clay	(Argentina) Brian Dabul	(Argentina) Brian Dabul (Argentina) Diego Moyano
Sri Lanka F1 Futures $10,000	October 20	Colombo; Sri Lanka	Clay	(South Korea) Kim Young-jun	(Thailand) Sanchai Ratiwatana (Thailand) Sonchat Ratiwatana
Jamaica F11 Futures $10,000	October 20	Montego Bay; Jamaica	Hard	(Venezuela) Kepler Orellana	(United Kingdom) Dan Kiernan (United Kingdom) David Sherwood
Cyprus F1 Futures $10,000	October 20	Nicosia; Cyprus	Clay	(Cyprus) Marcos Baghdatis	(Greece) Lefteris Alexiou (Greece) Alexandros Jakupovic
France F21 Futures $15,000	October 20	La Roche-sur-Yon; France	Hard (i)	(France) Jean-François Bachelot	(France) Marc Gicquel (France) Jean-Baptiste Perlant
Mexico F18 Futures $10,000	October 20	Ciudad Obregón; Mexico	Hard	(Argentina) Gustavo Marcaccio	(Mexico) Bruno Echagaray (Argentina) Gustavo Marcaccio
USA F29 Futures $15,000	October 20	Arlington; USA	Hard	(Argentina) Juan Pablo Guzmán	(United States) Brian Baker (United States) Bobby Reynolds
USA F30 Futures $15,000	October 27	Hammond; USA	Hard	(Chinese Taipei) Lu Yen-hsun	(Chinese Taipei) Lu Yen-hsun (Brazil) Bruno Soares
France F22 Futures $10,000	October 27	Rodez; France	Hard (i)	(France) Gary Lugassy	(Luxembourg) Gilles Kremer (Luxembourg) Mike Scheidweiler
Czech Rep. F4 Futures $10,000	October 27	Ostrava; Czech Republic	Hard	(Czech Republic) Martin Štěpánek	(Czech Republic) Martin Štěpánek (Czech Republic) Jiri Vrbka
Jamaica F12 Futures $10,000	October 27	Montego Bay; Jamaica	Hard	(Sweden) Jacob Adaktusson	(United Kingdom) Dan Kiernan (United Kingdom) David Sherwood
Argentina F5 Futures $10,000	October 27	Buenos Aires; Argentina	Clay	(Argentina) Sebastián Prieto	(Argentina) Carlos Berlocq (Argentina) Cristian Villagrán
Mexico F19 Futures $10,000	October 27	Mazatlán; Mexico	Hard	(Brazil) Franco Ferreiro	(United States) Scott Lipsky (United States) David Martin
Sri Lanka F2 Futures $10,000	October 27	Colombo; Sri Lanka	Clay	(Czech Republic) Jaroslav Pospíšil	(Czech Republic) Dušan Karol (Czech Republic) Jaroslav Pospíšil
Nigeria F6 Futures $15,000	October 27	Lagos; Nigeria	Hard	(South Africa) Raven Klaasen	(Zimbabwe) Genius Chidzikwe (South Africa) Raven Klaasen

=== November ===
Tournament	Date	City	Surface	Singles champions	Doubles champions
Mexico F20 Futures $10,000	November 3	León; Mexico	Hard	(Brazil) Franco Ferreiro	(Mexico) Bruno Echagaray (Mexico) Jorge Haro
Argentina F6 Futures $10,000	November 3	Buenos Aires; Argentina	Clay	(Argentina) Diego Moyano	(Argentina) Andrés Schneiter (Argentina) Gustavo Marcaccio
Jamaica F13 Futures $10,000	November 3	Kingston; Jamaica	Hard	(United Kingdom) Alan Mackin	(United Kingdom) Andrew Banks (United Kingdom) Jonathan Marray
Czech Rep. F5 Futures $10,000	November 3	Frýdlant nad Ostravicí; Czech Republic	Hard	(Czech Republic) Pavel Šnobel	(Netherlands) Bart De Gier (Belgium) Steve Darcis
Australia F3 Futures $15,000	November 3	Melbourne; Australia	Clay	(Australia) Todd Reid	(Australia) Raphael Durek (Australia) Alun Jones
Thailand F1 Futures $10,000	November 3	Pattaya; Thailand	Hard	(South Korea) Kim Young-jun	(Austria) Martin Slanar (Austria) Herbert Wiltschnig
Czech Rep. F6 Futures $10,000	November 10			(Belgium) Steve Darcis	(Poland) Tomasz Bednarek (Czech Republic) Petr Dezort
Australia F4 Futures $15,000	November 10	Frankston; Australia	Clay	(Australia) Todd Reid	(Australia) Shannon Nettle (Australia) Brad Weston
Thailand F2 Futures $10,000	November 10	Nakhon Ratchasima; Thailand	Hard	(Pakistan) Aisam-ul-Haq Qureshi	(India) Ajay Ramaswami (India) Sunil-Kumar Sipaeya
Uruguay F1 Futures $10,000	November 10	Montevideo; Uruguay	Clay	(Argentina) Edgardo Massa	(Argentina) Gustavo Marcaccio (Argentina) Patricio Rudi
USA F31 Futures $15,000	November 10	Honolulu; USA	Hard	(United States) Todd Widom	(United States) Keith From (United States) Trace Fielding
Spain F27 Futures $15,000	November 17	Las Palmas; Spain	Clay	(Germany) Florian Mayer	(Spain) Emilio Benfele Álvarez (Spain) Germán Puentes
USA F32 Futures $15,000	November 17	Waikoloa; USA	Hard	(Netherlands) Paul Logtens	(United States) Keith From (United States) Trace Fielding
Netherlands Antillies F1 Futures $10,000	November 17	Curaçao; Netherlands Antilles	Hard	(Sweden) Jacob Adaktusson	(Netherlands) Michel Koning (Netherlands) Steven Korteling
Vietnam F1 Futures $10,000	November 17	Hanoi; Vietnam	Hard	(Denmark) Frederik Nielsen	(Austria) Martin Slanar (Austria) Herbert Wiltschnig
Uruguay F2 Futures $10,000	November 17	Montevideo; Uruguay	Clay	(Argentina) Juan Mónaco	(Argentina) Gustavo Gómez (Argentina) Sebastian Uriarte
Australia F5 Futures $15,000	November 17	Berri; Australia	Grass	(Australia) Mark Hlawaty	(Australia) Luke Bourgeois (Australia) Chris Guccione
India F6 Futures $10,000	November 17	Dehradun; India	Hard	(Pakistan) Aisam-ul-Haq Qureshi	(India) Ajay Ramaswami (India) Sunil-Kumar Sipaeya
Australia F6 Futures $15,000	November 24	Barmera; Australia	Grass	(Australia) Domenic Marafiote	(Australia) Marc Kimmich (Australia) Robert Smeets
Aruba F1 Futures $10,000	November 24	Oranjestad; Aruba	Hard	(Netherlands) Paul Logtens	(Italy) Alessandro Motti (France) Stéphane Robert
India F7 Futures $10,000	November 24	New Delhi; India	Hard	(Pakistan) Aisam-ul-Haq Qureshi	(India) Harsh Mankad (Pakistan) Aisam-ul-Haq Qureshi
Chinese Taipei F1 Futures $15,000	November 24	Kaohsiung; Chinese Taipei	Hard	(Chinese Taipei) Jimmy Wang	(Thailand) Sanchai Ratiwatana (Thailand) Sonchat Ratiwatana
Spain F28 Futures $15,000	November 24	Maspalomas; Spain	Clay	(Greece) Konstantinos Economidis	(Spain) Iván Navarro (Spain) Santiago Ventura

=== December ===
Tournament	Date	City	Surface	Singles champions	Doubles champions
Spain F29 Futures $10,000	December 1	Pontevedra; Spain	Clay	(Spain) Santiago Ventura	(Spain) Eduardo Nicolás (Spain) Germán Puentes
India F8 Futures $10,000	December 1	Mumbai; India	Hard	(India) Harsh Mankad	(India) Mustafa Ghouse (Pakistan) Aisam-ul-Haq Qureshi
Spain F30 Futures $10,000	December 8	Ourense; Spain	Hard (i)	(France) Gary Lugassy	(United Kingdom) Jamie Baker (Romania) Adrian Cruciat
Iran F3 Futures $15,000	December 8	Kish Island; Iran	Clay	(Poland) Michał Przysiężny	(Romania) Adrian Barbu (Romania) Gabriel Moraru
Iran F4 Futures $15,000	December 15	Kish Island; Iran	Clay	(Algeria) Lamine Ouahab	(Italy) Leonardo Azzaro (Argentina) Diego Álvarez
