= Luke Bourgeois =

Australian tennis player

- Country (sports): Australia
- Born: 3 March 1977 (age 48); Sydney, Australia
- Height: 188 cm (6 ft 2 in)
- Plays: Right-handed
- Coach: Tony Roche
- Prize money: $120,817

Singles
- Career record: 0–2
- Career titles: 0; 0 Challenger, 3 Futures
- Highest ranking: No. 262 (12 June 2006)

Grand Slam singles results
- Australian Open: Q1 (2003, 2004, 2005, 2006)
- Wimbledon: Q1 (2006)
- US Open: Q1 (2006)

Doubles
- Career record: 1–4
- Career titles: 0; 4 Challenger, 18 Futures
- Highest ranking: No. 169 (12 January 2004)

Grand Slam doubles results
- Australian Open: 2R (2003)

Grand Slam mixed doubles results
- Australian Open: 1R (2005)
- Last updated on: 25 July 2023.

Luke Bourgeois (born 3 March 1977) is a former professional tennis player from Australia.

== Career ==
Bourgeois, who is the youngest of 10 siblings, won the boys' doubles title at the 1995 Australian Open, with Lee Jong-min. They defeated Germans Nicolas Kiefer and Ulrich Jasper Seetzen in the final.

His two singles appearances on the ATP Tour came at the Medibank International, in 2005 (beaten by Andrei Pavel) and 2007 (beaten by Carlos Moyá). In his loss to Moyá, he held a match point, before losing in a third set tiebreak.

Bourgeois competed in the main draw of the Australian Open three times, all in the men's doubles. In 2003, he made the second round, with Scott Draper.

== Junior Grand Slam finals ==
=== Doubles: 1 (1 title) ===
Result	Year	Tournament	Surface	Partner	Opponents	Score
Win	1995	Australian Open	Hard	(South Korea) Lee Jong-min	(Germany) Ulrich Jasper Seetzen (Germany) Nicolas Kiefer	6–2, 6–1

== ATP Challenger and ITF Futures finals ==
=== Singles: 12 (3–9) ===
Legend ATP Challenger (0–0) ITF Futures (3–9)	Finals by surface Hard (1–6) Clay (0–0) Grass (2–3) Carpet (0–0)

Result	W–L	Date	Tournament	Tier	Surface	Opponent	Score
Loss	0–1	Sep 2001	Spain F10, Madrid	Futures	Hard	(Spain) Santiago Ventura	5–7, 6–7^{(4–7)}
Win	1–1	Nov 2001	Thailand F1, Pattaya	Futures	Hard	(South Korea) Kim Dong-hyun	4–6, 7–5, 6–3
Loss	1–2	Dec 2001	Australia F1, Barmera	Futures	Grass	(Australia) Jaymon Crabb	2–6, 1–6
Loss	1–3	Sep 2002	Tunisia F1, El Menzah	Futures	Hard	(Slovakia) Branislav Sekac	4–6, 4–6
Loss	1–4	Sep 2002	Great Britain F7, Glasgow	Futures	Hard	(United Kingdom) Richard Bloomfield	6–7^{(4–7)}, 6–7^{(3–7)}
Win	2–4	Nov 2004	Australia F4, Barmera	Futures	Grass	(Australia) Marc Kimmich	7–6^{(7–4)}, 2–6, 6–2
Loss	2–5	Jun 2005	Spain F11, Tenerife	Futures	Hard	(Spain) Rafael Moreno-Negrin	2–6, 2–6
Loss	2–6	Sep 2005	Australia F5, Rockhampton	Futures	Hard	(Australia) Robert Smeets	6–7^{(3–7)}, 6–2, 4–6
Loss	2–7	Oct 2005	Australia F6, Brisbane	Futures	Hard	(Serbia) Aleksandar Vlaski	2–6, 0–3 ret.
Win	3–7	Nov 2005	Australia F10, Berri	Futures	Grass	(Australia) Joseph Sirianni	6–1, 3–6, 6–3
Loss	3–8	Nov 2005	Australia F11, Barmera	Futures	Grass	(Romania) Horia Tecau	6–3, 2–6, 5–7
Loss	3–9	Jul 2006	Great Britain F9, Felixstowe	Futures	Grass	(United Kingdom) Josh Goodall	4–6, 7–5, 4–6

=== Doubles: 35 (22–13) ===
Legend ATP Challenger (4–3) ITF Futures (18–10)	Finals by surface Hard (15–9) Clay (3–3) Grass (3–1) Carpet (1–0)

Result	W–L	Date	Tournament	Tier	Surface	Partner	Opponents	Score
Loss	0–1	Nov 1998	Australia F2, Frankston	Futures	Clay	(Australia) Andrew Painter	(Belgium) Kris Goossens (Germany) Toby Mitchell	6–4, 1–6, 2–6
Win	1–1	Apr 1999	New Zealand F1, Tauranga	Futures	Hard	(Serbia) Dejan Petrović	(Australia) Jordan Kerr (Australia) Michael Logarzo	6–3, 7–5
Win	2–1	Apr 1999	New Zealand F2, Timaru	Futures	Hard	(Serbia) Dejan Petrović	(United States) Wynn Criswell (South Africa) Shaun Rudman	6–4, 1–6, 6–3
Loss	2–2	Jul 1999	Bristol, United Kingdom	Challenger	Grass	(Serbia) Dejan Petrović	(Germany) Jan-Ralph Brandt (South Africa) Jeff Coetzee	4–6, 3–6
Win	3–2	Jul 2000	France 15, Aix-les-Bains	Futures	Clay	(Australia) Domenic Marafiote	(Spain) Sergi Duran-Bernad (Spain) David Marrero	5–4^{(7–5)}, 4–2, 4–2
Loss	3–3	Aug 2000	France 16, Aix-les-Bains	Futures	Hard	(Australia) Domenic Marafiote	(France) Benjamin Cassaigne (France) Julien Cuaz	5–3, 3–5, 4–1, 2–4, 1–4
Loss	3–4	Mar 2001	New Zealand F2, Christchurch	Futures	Hard	(Australia) Andrew Painter	(Sweden) Henrik Andersson (Sweden) Bjorn Rehnquist	6–3, 3–6, 2–4
Loss	3–5	Apr 2001	Great Britain F3, Bournemouth	Futures	Clay	(Australia) Michael Tebbutt	(Australia) Ben Ellwood (Australia) Todd Larkham	6–7^{(4–7)}, 6–7^{(4–7)}
Win	4–5	May 2001	Great Britain F4, Hatfield	Futures	Clay	(Australia) Ben Ellwood	(United Kingdom) Simon Dickson (United Kingdom) Mark Hilton	6–3, 6–3
Win	5–5	May 2001	Greece F2, Kalamata	Futures	Hard	(Australia) Josh Tuckfield	(Germany) Jan Boruszewski (South Africa) Louis Vosloo	6–7^{(8–10)}, 6–3, 7–5
Win	6–5	Jun 2001	Greece F4, Syros	Futures	Hard	(Australia) Josh Tuckfield	(Israel) Lior Dahan (Israel) Tomer Suissa	6–4, 6–3
Win	7–5	Jul 2001	France F10, Toulon	Futures	Clay	(Australia) Alun Jones	(France) Xavier Audouy (Monaco) Christophe Bosio	6–3, 7–6^{(7–2)}
Loss	7–6	Aug 2001	Wrexham, United Kingdom	Challenger	Hard	(Pakistan) Aisam Qureshi	(Belgium) Gilles Elseneer (Germany) Alexander Popp	7–5, 5–7, 2–6
Loss	7–7	Sep 2001	Great Britain F8, Glasgow	Futures	Hard	(Australia) Alun Jones	(United Kingdom) Mark Hilton (New Zealand) Daniel Willman	2–6, 6–3, 6–7^{(5–7)}
Win	8–7	Oct 2001	Greece F4, Corfu	Futures	Carpet	(Slovakia) Igor Zelenay	(Czech Republic) Michal Navratil (Czech Republic) Jiri Vrbka	6–4, 7–6^{(9–7)}
Loss	8–8	May 2002	Great Britain F4, Hatfield	Futures	Clay	(Australia) Alun Jones	(France) Nicolas Perrein (Luxembourg) Mike Scheidweiler	6–7^{(2–7)}, 6–4, 3–6
Loss	8–9	Jun 2002	USA F13, Fresno	Futures	Hard	(Australia) Alun Jones	(United States) Nick Rainey (United States) Brian Wilson	3–6, 6–1, 4–6
Win	9–9	Jun 2002	USA F14, Sunnyvale	Futures	Hard	(Australia) Alun Jones	(North Macedonia) Lazar Magdinchev (United States) Jeff Williams	7–6^{(7–5)}, 4–6, 7–5
Loss	9–10	Jun 2002	USA F15, Berkeley	Futures	Hard	(Australia) Alun Jones	(United States) Nick Rainey (United States) Brian Wilson	3–6, 6–3, 3–6
Win	10–10	Sep 2002	Tunisia F1, El Menzah	Futures	Hard	(Sweden) Henrik Andersson	(France) Benjamin Cassaigne (Germany) Frank Moser	7–6^{(7–5)}, 6–7^{(5–7)}, 7–6^{(7–5)}
Win	11–10	Sep 2002	Great Britain F7, Glasgow	Futures	Hard	(Australia) Alun Jones	(United Kingdom) Jonathan Marray (United Kingdom) David Sherwood	6–1, 6–2
Win	12–10	Apr 2003	Australia F2, Devonport	Futures	Hard	(Australia) Chris Guccione	(South Africa) Dirk Stegmann (United States) Aaron Talarico	6–2, 6–4
Loss	12–11	Nov 2003	Australia F4, Melbourne	Futures	Clay	(Australia) Chris Guccione	(Australia) Shannon Nettle (Australia) Brad Weston	6–4, 4–6, [9–11]
Win	13–11	Nov 2003	Australia F5, Berri	Futures	Grass	(Australia) Chris Guccione	(Australia) Shannon Nettle (Australia) Brad Weston	6–4, 7–6^{(7–4)}
Loss	13–12	Jan 2004	Noumea, New Caledonia	Challenger	Hard	(Australia) Vince Mellino	(Australia) Ashley Fisher (Australia) Stephen Huss	6–3, 4–6, 4–6
Win	14–12	Nov 2004	Caloundra, Australia	Challenger	Hard	(Chinese Taipei) Lu Yen-Hsun	(Australia) Mark Hlawaty (Australia) Shannon Nettle	7–6^{(7–2)}, 7–5
Win	15–12	Nov 2004	Australia F4, Barmera	Futures	Grass	(Australia) Adam Feeney	(Australia) Robert Smeets (Australia) Mark Way	6–7^{(9–11)}, 6–3, [11–9]
Win	16–12	Feb 2005	Burnie, Australia	Challenger	Hard	(Australia) Chris Guccione	(Sweden) Alexander Hartman (United States) Scott Lipsky	6–4, 6–3
Win	17–12	Sep 2005	Australia F5, Rockhampton	Futures	Hard	(Australia) Steven Goh	(Australia) Sadik Kadir (Australia) Joel Kerley	6–3, 6–3
Win	18–12	Feb 2006	Burnie, Australia	Challenger	Hard	(Chinese Taipei) Lu Yen-Hsun	(Australia) Raphael Durek (Australia) Alun Jones	6–3, 6–2
Win	19–12	Jul 2006	Great Britain F9, Felixstowe	Futures	Grass	(United Kingdom) Lee Childs	(United Kingdom) Josh Goodall (United Kingdom) Ross Hutchins	4–6, 6–3, 7–6^{(7–3)}
Loss	19–13	Oct 2006	Australia F9, Happy Valley	Futures	Hard	(Australia) Alun Jones	(Australia) Adam Feeney (Australia) Dane Fernandez	2–6, 6–3, [6–10]
Win	20–13	Feb 2007	Australia F2, Sydney	Futures	Hard	(Australia) Adam Feeney	(United States) James Cerretani (New Zealand) Daniel King-Turner	7–6^{(7–3)}, 6–2
Win	21–13	Apr 2007	Great Britain F8, Bath	Futures	Hard	(United Kingdom) Lee Childs	(United Kingdom) Jamie Delgado (Croatia) Lovro Zovko	3–6, 5–3 ret.
Win	22–13	May 2007	Lanzarote, Spain	Challenger	Hard	(South Africa) Rik De Voest	(Israel) Noam Okun (Israel) Dudi Sela	6–3, 6–1
