= Alessandro Guevara =

Brazilian tennis player

- Country (sports): Brazil
- Born: 29 June 1974 (age 50)
- Prize money: $14,704

Singles
- Highest ranking: No. 592 (25 Feb 2002)

Doubles
- Highest ranking: No. 211 (30 Sep 2002)

Alessandro Guevara (born 29 June 1974) is a Brazilian former professional tennis player.

Guevara, who comes from Rio de Janeiro, had career high rankings of 592 for singles and 211 for doubles, featuring mostly on the satellite and ITF Futures circuits. He made it to ATP Challenger level as a doubles player and won a tournament in Gramado in 2002.

== Challenger/Futures titles ==
=== Singles ===
Legend
ITF Futures (1)

No.	Date	Tournament	Tier	Surface	Opponent	Score
1.	Nov 2001	Brazil F9, Fortaleza	Futures	Hard	(Brazil) Júlio Silva	6–4, 1–6, 6–3

=== Doubles ===
Legend
ATP Challenger (1)
ITF Futures (2)

No.	Date	Tournament	Tier	Surface	Partner	Opponents	Score
1.	Nov 2001	Brazil F9, Fortaleza	Futures	Hard	(Brazil) Rodrigo Ribeiro	(Argentina) Andres Dellatorre (Chile) Juan-Felipe Yanez	6–4, 6–4
1.	Aug 2002	Gramado Challenger, Gramado, Brazil	Challenger	Hard	(Australia) Dejan Petrović	(Russia) Denis Golovanov (United States) Michael Joyce	3–6, 7–5, 6–2
2.	Aug 2002	Brazil F1, São Paulo	Futures	Clay	(Brazil) Pedro Braga	(Brazil) Marcelo Melo (Brazil) Bruno Soares	6–3, 7–5
