= Domenic Marafiote =

Australian tennis player

- Country (sports): Australia
- Born: 7 April 1981 (age 43)
- Plays: Left-handed
- Prize money: $52,763

Singles
- Highest ranking: No. 328 (26 July 2004)

Grand Slam singles results
- Australian Open: Q1 (2000, 2003, 2004, 2005)

Doubles
- Career record: 0-1
- Highest ranking: No. 339 (9 July 2001)

Grand Slam doubles results
- Australian Open: 1R (2005)

Domenic Marafiote (born 7 April 1981) is an Australian former professional tennis player.

A left-handed player from Adelaide, Marafiote had a best singles ranking of 328 in the world and won three titles at ITF Futures level. He featured in the qualifying draw for the Australian Open on four occasions and as a doubles player made a main draw appearance in 2005 partnering Robert Smeets, for a first round loss to Albert Costa/Rafael Nadal.

== ITF Futures titles ==
=== Singles: (3) ===
No.	Date	Tournament	Surface	Opponent	Score
1.	Aug 2003	USA F23, Godfrey	Hard	(Japan) Michihisa Onoda	6–3, 6–7^{(5–7)}, 6–3
2.	Nov 2003	Australia F6, Barmera	Grass	(Australia) Shannon Nettle	6–1, 6–2
3.	Mar 2004	New Zealand F1, Blenheim	Hard	(Austria) Herbert Wiltschnig	4–6, 6–0, 7–6^{(7–2)}

=== Doubles: (8) ===
No.	Date	Tournament	Surface	Partner	Opponents	Score
1.	Oct 1999	Australia F1, Beaumaris	Clay	(Australia) Tim Crichton	(Australia) Ben Ellwood (Australia) Dejan Petrović	7–6, 6–3
2.	Jul 2000	France F15, Aix-les-Bains	Clay	(Australia) Luke Bourgeois	(Spain) Sergi Durán (Spain) David Marrero	5–4^{(5)}, 4–2, 4–2
3.	Apr 2001	China F1, Kunming City	Hard	(Australia) Ashley Ford	(Japan) Akira Matsushita (Japan) Michihisa Onoda	6–2, 6–4
4.	Sep 2001	Japan F8, Kawaguchi	Hard	(Australia) Ashley Ford	(Japan) Tetsuya Chaen (Japan) Tasuku Iwami	6–1, 6–3
5.	Jun 2003	Spain F11, Lanzarote	Hard	(Slovakia) Ivo Klec	(Spain) Rafael Moreno-Negrin (Spain) Ferran Ventura-Martell	6–3, 6–4
6.	Jun 2003	Spain F12, Gran Canaria	Clay	(Slovakia) Ivo Klec	(China) Zeng Shaoxuan (China) Zhu Benqiang	6–4, 5–7, 7–6^{(7–1)}
7.	Aug 2003	USA F24, Kenosha	Hard	(Australia) Adam Kennedy	(India) Harsh Mankad (India) Vishal Uppal	4–6, 6–3, 7–6^{(7–5)}
8.	May 2005	Thailand F3, Phuket	Hard	(United States) Michael Yani	(United States) Phillip King (United States) Trevor Spracklin	6–7^{(4–7)}, 6–4, 6–4
