= Gianluca Luddi =

Italian tennis player

- Country (sports): Italy
- Born: 4 February 1978 (age 47); Rome, Italy
- Plays: Right-handed
- Prize money: $47,526

Singles
- Highest ranking: No. 183 (1 May 2000)

Grand Slam singles results
- French Open: Q1 (2000)

Doubles
- Highest ranking: No. 426 (24 Apr 2000)

Gianluca Luddi (born 4 February 1978) is an Italian former professional tennis player.

Born in Rome, Luddi had a best singles world ranking of 183 and won an ATP Challenger title at Bressanone in 1999, beating Thierry Guardiola in the final. He had wins over top-100 players Jacobo Díaz and Guillermo Cañas en route to the semi-finals of the 1999 Buenos Aires Challenger. In 2000 he featured in the qualifying draw for the French Open.

Luddi now coaches tennis in Turin and is married to tennis player Stefania Chieppa.

== Challenger/Futures titles ==
Legend
ATP Challenger (1)
ITF Futures (4)

=== Singles: (5) ===
No.	Date	Tournament	Tier	Surface	Opponents	Score
1.	Aug 1998	Italy F11, Forlì	Futures	Clay	(Italy) Pietro Angelini	6–0, 6–2
1.	Aug 1999	Bressanone Challenger, Bressanone	Challenger	Clay	(France) Thierry Guardiola	6–4, 6–4
2.	May 2001	Italy F3, Latina	Futures	Clay	(Spain) Pedro Canovas-Garcia	7–6^{(7)}, 7–6^{(5)}
3.	Oct 2001	Venezuela F1, Caracas	Futures	Clay	(Hungary) Gergely Kisgyörgy	6–4, 6–1
4.	May 2002	Italy F3, Verona	Futures	Clay	(Argentina) Marcelo Charpentier	7–6^{(4)}, 6–7^{(5)}, 6–2
