= Doug Bohaboy =

American tennis player

- Country (sports): United States
- Residence: Palo Alto, California, United States
- Born: 25 September 1976 (age 49) Mountain View, California, United States
- Plays: Right-handed
- Prize money: $63,432

Singles
- Career record: 0–1
- Career titles: 3 ITF
- Highest ranking: No. 250 (23 June 2003)

Doubles
- Career record: 0–0
- Career titles: 1 Challenger, 6 ITF
- Highest ranking: No. 222 (23 September 2002)
- Last updated on: 26 August 2019.

Doug Bohaboy (born 25 September 1976) is a retired American tennis player.

Bohaboy has a career high ATP singles ranking of 250 achieved on 23 June 2003. He also has a career high doubles ranking of 222 achieved on 23 September 2002.

Bohaboy has won 1 ATP Challenger doubles title at the 2002 Tampere Open.

== Tour titles ==
Legend
Grand Slam (0)
ATP Masters Series (0)
ATP Tour (0)
Challengers (1)

=== Doubles ===
Result	Date	Category	Tournament	Surface	Partner	Opponents	Score
Winner	July 2002	Challenger	Tampere, Finland	Clay	(United States) Nick Rainey	(Finland) Tuomas Ketola (Finland) Jarkko Nieminen	6–4, 6–2
