= Nick Rainey =

American tennis player (born 1980)

- Full name: Nicholas Tucker Rainey
- Country (sports): United States
- Born: December 7, 1980 (age 44); Santa Monica, California
- Plays: Right-handed
- Prize money: $19,913

Singles
- Highest ranking: No. 832 (July 8, 2002)

Doubles
- Career record: 0–1
- Highest ranking: No. 173 (August 26, 2002)

Nicholas Rainey (born December 7, 1980) is a former professional tennis player from the United States.

== Biography ==
Born in Santa Monica, Rainey grew up on Mercer Island, Washington. Rainey, who was coached by James Kasser, was a right-handed player, with a double-handed backhand. One of his doubles partners as a junior was Andy Roddick. A member of the University of Southern California tennis team, Rainey and doubles partner Ryan Moore were runners-up in the 2000 NCAA Division I Championships. He also made the singles quarter-finals at the 2002 NCAA Division I Championships, with wins over Todd Widom, Benjamin Becker and John Chesworth.

From 2002 he competed professionally, mostly on the doubles circuit. He reached a highest doubles ranking of 173 in the world and won a total of 12 ITF Futures titles. Both on his ATP Challenger titles were also in doubles, the Tampere Open with Doug Bohaboy in 2002 and the Burbank Challenger partnering Brian Wilson in 2004. It was with Wilson that he made his only main draw appearance on the ATP Tour, at the 2005 China Open. They were beaten in the first round of the Beijing tournament by eventual semi-finalists Lars Burgsmüller and Lee Hyung-taik in a close three-set match that was decided by a tie-break.

Rainey has also been a professional poker player. In 2011 it was reported that he had allegedly sold shares for his entry into a World Series of Poker main event which he never registered for and then failed to return the money to his backers.

== Challenger titles ==
=== Doubles: (2) ===
No.	Year	Tournament	Surface	Partner	Opponents	Score
1.	2002	Tampere, Finland	Clay	(United States) Doug Bohaboy	(Finland) Tuomas Ketola (Finland) Jarkko Nieminen	6–4, 6–2
2.	2004	Burbank, U.S.	Hard	(United States) Brian Wilson	(India) Prakash Amritraj (Philippines) Eric Taino	6–2, 6–3
