= Francisco Fogués =

Spanish tennis player (born 1977)

- Full name: Francisco Fogués Domenech
- Country (sports): Spain
- Residence: Valencia, Spain
- Born: 6 August 1977 (age 47); Valencia, Spain
- Height: 1.91 m (6 ft 3 in)
- Turned pro: 1998
- Plays: Left-handed
- Prize money: $83,263

Singles
- Career record: 1–2
- Career titles: 0; 0 Challenger, 6 Futures
- Highest ranking: No. 179 (1 December 2003)

Grand Slam singles results
- Australian Open: Q2 (2004)
- French Open: Q2 (2004)
- Wimbledon: Q1 (1997, 2003, 2004)

Doubles
- Career record: 0–0
- Career titles: 0; 0 Challenger, 0 Futures
- Highest ranking: No. 351 (7 April 1997)
- Last updated on: 18 November 2021.

Francisco "Paco" Fogués Domenech (born 6 August 1977) is a former professional tennis player from Spain.

== Biography ==
A left-handed player from Valencia, Fogués turned professional at the age of 21. His coaches included Salvador Roselló and former ATP Tour player José Altur.

He was runner-up at Challenger tournaments at Trandi and Brindisi in 2003.

Both of his main draw appearances on the ATP Tour came in 2005. At the 2005 Torneo Godó in Barcelona he made it through qualifying, then had a first round win over Christophe Rochus, before his run by ended by Nikolay Davydenko. He also featured as a qualifier at Sankt Pölten and was beaten in the first round by Félix Mantilla.

Fogués, who had previously coached Pablo Andújar, was the coach of David Ferrer from 2014 until Ferrer's retirement in 2019.

== ATP Challenger and ITF Futures finals ==
=== Singles: 13 (6–7) ===
Legend ATP Challenger (0–2) ITF Futures (6–5)	Finals by surface Hard (2–1) Clay (4–6) Grass (0–0) Carpet (0–0)

Result	W–L	Date	Tournament	Tier	Surface	Opponent	Score
Loss	0–1	Oct 2000	Spain F11, Barcelona	Futures	Clay	(Argentina) Diego Hipperdinger	3–6, 2–6
Win	1–1	Oct 2000	Spain F12, Martos	Futures	Hard	(United States) Jason Cook	4–6, 7–6^{(8–6)}, 6–2
Win	2–1	Jul 2001	Spain F2, Elche	Futures	Clay	(Spain) Mariano Albert-Ferrando	7–5, 6–2
Win	3–1	Jul 2001	Spain F3, Gandia	Futures	Clay	(Spain) Mario Munoz-Bejarano	6–2, 6–4
Loss	3–2	Sep 2001	Spain F12, Barcelona	Futures	Clay	(Spain) Oscar Burrieza-Lopez	3–6, 1–6
Loss	3–3	Jun 2002	Finland F1, Savitaipale	Futures	Clay	(Germany) Simon Greul	6–7^{(4–7)}, 2–6
Win	4–3	Feb 2003	Spain F3, Lorca	Futures	Clay	(Spain) Miguel-Angel Lopez Jaen	6–2, 7–5
Loss	4–4	Mar 2003	France F6, Lille	Futures	Hard	(Italy) Stefano Pescosolido	3–6, 6–3, 4–6
Loss	4–5	Apr 2003	Spain F6, Rocafort	Futures	Clay	(Spain) German Puentes-Alcaniz	6–1, 4–6, 3–6
Win	5–5	Apr 2003	Spain F8, Xàbia	Futures	Clay	(Spain) Miguel-Angel Lopez Jaen	6–3, 6–1
Loss	5–6	Aug 2003	Trani, Italy	Challenger	Clay	(Argentina) Martin Vassallo Arguello	3–6, 5–7
Loss	5–7	Aug 2003	Brindisi, Italy	Challenger	Clay	(Spain) Galo Blanco	5–7, 6–1, 5–7
Win	6–7	Sep 2004	Spain F24, Madrid	Futures	Hard	(Austria) Marco Mirnegg	2–6, 7–5, 6–1

=== Doubles: 1 (0–1) ===
Legend ATP Challenger (0–0) ITF Futures (0–1)	Finals by surface Hard (0–0) Clay (0–1) Grass (0–0) Carpet (0–0)

Result	W–L	Date	Tournament	Tier	Surface	Partner	Opponents	Score
Loss	0–1	Mar 2006	Italy F4, Siracuse	Futures	Clay	(Spain) Pablo Andujar	(Belgium) Jeroen Masson (Spain) Gabriel Trujillo-Soler	6–1, 1–6, 6–7^{(5–7)}
