= Thomas Dupré =

French tennis player

- Country (sports): France
- Born: 9 June 1974 (age 50)
- Prize money: $71,576

Singles
- Career record: 0–1 (at ATP Tour level, Grand Slam level, and in Davis Cup)
- Career titles: 0
- Highest ranking: No. 229 (22 July 2002)

Doubles
- Career record: 0–0 (at ATP Tour level, Grand Slam level, and in Davis Cup)
- Career titles: 0
- Highest ranking: No. 423 (17 March 2003)
- Last updated on: 8 March 2021.

Thomas Dupré (born 9 June 1974) is a former French tennis player.

Dupré has a career high ATP singles ranking of 229 achieved on 22 July 2002. He also has a career high ATP doubles ranking of 423 achieved on 17 March 2003.

Dupré made his ATP main draw debut at the 2002 Tata Open after qualifying for the singles main draw.

He plays for the TC ARRAS (FRANCE-62) for the season 2024/2025 (PRO B).
