= Lars Uebel =

German tennis player and coach

- Country (sports): Germany
- Born: 14 October 1980 (age 44); Berlin, Germany
- Plays: Right-handed (two-handed backhand)
- Prize money: $122,231

Singles
- Career record: 0–1 (at ATP Tour level, Grand Slam level, and in Davis Cup)
- Career titles: 5 ITF
- Highest ranking: No. 242 (20 March 2006)

Doubles
- Career record: 0–2 (at ATP Tour level, Grand Slam level, and in Davis Cup)
- Career titles: 2 Challenger, 16 ITF
- Highest ranking: No. 168 (9 January 2006)
- Last updated on: 20 February 2017.

Lars Uebel (born 14 October 1980) is a retired German tennis player and coach.

Uebel has a career high ATP singles ranking of 242 achieved on 20 March 2006. He also has a career high ATP doubles ranking of 168 achieved on 9 January 2006.

Uebel made his ATP main draw debut at the 2005 Ordina Open in the singles draw facing Guillermo Coria.
