= Pedro Braga =

Brazilian tennis player

- Full name: Pedro Braga
- Country (sports): Brazil
- Born: 27 February 1975 (age 50)
- Prize money: $59,313

Singles
- Career record: 0–1
- Career titles: 0
- Highest ranking: No. 251 (18 November 2002)

Doubles
- Career record: 0–1
- Career titles: 0
- Highest ranking: No. 330 (15 September 2003)

Pedro Braga (born 27 February 1975) is a former professional tennis player from Brazil.

== Biography ==
=== Early life ===
Braga, the son of a doctor, comes from Belo Horizonte. He started playing tennis at the age of eight and competed as a junior at Wimbledon and the US Open in 1992.

While at the US Open he was recruited to join Louisiana State University (LSU) on a tennis scholarship.

=== College tennis ===
In his sophomore year at LSU in 1995 he earned All-American selection and was named the Louisiana Player of the Year.

At the beginning of the 1996 collegiate season he began struggling with a back injury which by April was bad enough that he was forced to pull out of the competition. An MRI scan revealed that he had suffered a spinal disc herniation and, then aged 21, he was informed he would never play tennis again. After undergoing back surgery he spent almost two-years out of the game before making his comeback in 1998.

=== Professional tour ===
Soon after returning from his back injury he began his professional career on the international satellite and challenger circuits. He went on to win a total of 11 ITF Futures titles. The closest he came to making a Grand Slam tournament was the Australian Open in 2003 where he made it to the second round of qualifying.

Braga twice featured in the main draw of the Brasil Open, a tournament on the ATP Tour. In 2003 he partnered Júlio Silva in the doubles and in 2004 he was given a wildcard into the singles competition, where he lost in the first round to Peru's Luis Horna.

In 2004 he was found to have tested positive to stanozolol, a synthetic anabolic androgenic steroid. A tribunal handed down a two-year suspension from tennis, which was the maximum possible penalty. The sample came from when he competed in the qualifying rounds of 2003 Brasil Open.
