= Benjamin Cassaigne =

French tennis player

- Country (sports): France
- Born: 2 April 1976 (age 49) Paris, France
- Height: 1.85 m (6 ft 1 in)
- Plays: Left-handed
- Prize money: $56,402

Singles
- Career record: 0–0 (at ATP Tour level, Grand Slam level, and in Davis Cup)
- Career titles: 4 ITF
- Highest ranking: No. 302 (10 June 2002)

Doubles
- Career record: 0–0 (at ATP Tour level, Grand Slam level, and in Davis Cup)
- Career titles: 1 Challenger, 10 ITF
- Highest ranking: No. 182 (3 March 2003)
- Last updated on: 25 June 2018.

Benjamin Cassaigne (born 2 April 1976) is a former French tennis player.

Cassaigne achieved a career-high ATP singles ranking of 302 achieved on 10 June 2002. He also reached a career-high ATP doubles ranking of 182 on 3 March 2003.

Cassaigne has one ATP Challenger Tour title at the 2003 Challenger La Manche.
