= Dejan Petrović =

Australian-born Serbian tennis player and coach

- Country (sports): Australia (until 2003); Serbia and Montenegro (2003–2006); Serbia (from 2006)
- Residence: Kragujevac, Serbia
- Born: 3 April 1978 (age 48) Adelaide, Australia
- Plays: Right-handed
- Prize money: US$165,873

Singles
- Career record: 2–6
- Career titles: 0
- Highest ranking: No. 157 (7 August 2000)

Grand Slam singles results
- Australian Open: 1R (2000, 2001)
- Wimbledon: 1R (2000)

Doubles
- Career record: 5–8
- Career titles: 0
- Highest ranking: No. 116 (15 July 2002)

Grand Slam doubles results
- Australian Open: 2R (1999, 2002)
- Wimbledon: 2R (2002)
- US Open: 1R (2001)

Coaching career (2003–)
- Novak Djokovic (2004–2005) Serbia and Montenegro Davis Cup team (2005–2006) Serbia Davis Cup team (2006–2007) Jelena Janković (2006) Nikola Milojević (2011–2012) Ana Ivanovic (2014–2015) Ivana Jorović (2015–2016) Laslo Djere (2016–2018) Jimmy Wang ( – )

Dejan Petrović (Serbian Cyrillic: Дејан Петровић; born 3 April 1978) is an Australian-born Serbian tennis coach and former professional tennis player. He played Davis Cup for Serbia and Montenegro.

== Career ==
Petrović made his Grand Slam debut in the 1998 Australian Open, partnering Grant Silcock in the doubles. They were eliminated in the opening round but made it into the second round a year later, at the 1999 Australian Open. In 2002 he reached the second round at the Australian Open and Wimbledon, partnering Todd Perry and then David Škoch.

As a singles player, Petrović made two Australian Open appearances and played once at Wimbledon, but didn't win a match in either event. He lost four set matches to Leander Paes and Sargis Sargsian in the Australian Opens and lost in straight sets to Martin Damm at Wimbledon.

He was a wildcard entrant in the 2000 AAPT Championships, held in his hometown, Adelaide. After defeating Frenchman Stéphane Huet, Petrović was beaten comfortably by another local, Lleyton Hewitt, who courted controversy when he called the crowd "stupid" for not cheering for him.

Petrović relocated in 2003 to Serbia, where his sister and parents lived. He immediately represented his new country in the Davis Cup, playing doubles with Nenad Zimonjić. The pair would play three matches together in total, winning two of them.

He is now running a tennis academy in the Serbian city of Kragujevac. The most successful player that he has coached is Novak Djokovic, who first starting working with Petrović at the age of 16. Under the mentoring of Petrović, Djokovic went from being ranked outside the top 300 to breaking into the top 100 in less than a year.

Petrović coached Ana Ivanovic until 2015.

== Challenger titles ==
=== Doubles: (8) ===
No.	Year	Tournament	Surface	Partner	Opponents	Score
1.	2000	Manchester Challenger, Manchester, Great Britain	Grass	(Israel) Andy Ram	(Switzerland) Yves Allegro (Switzerland) Ivo Heuberger	6–2, 7–6^{(7–1)}
2.	2000	Córdoba Challenger, Córdoba, Spain	Hard	(Israel) Andy Ram	(Spain) Óscar Burrieza (Brazil) Daniel Melo	6–1, 6–4
3.	2000	Sofia Challenger, Sofia, Bulgaria	Clay	(Bulgaria) Orlin Stanoytchev	(Bulgaria) Radoslav Lukaev (Austria) Luben Pampoulov	6–2, 6–7^{(5–7)}, 7–6^{(7–5)}
4.	2001	MasterCard Tennis Cup, Campos do Jordão, Brazil	Hard	(Israel) Andy Ram	(Brazil) Adriano Ferreira (Brazil) Daniel Melo	6–3, 6–4
5.	2001	Belo Horizonte Challenger, Belo Horizonte, Brazil	Hard	(Israel) Andy Ram	(United Kingdom) Barry Cowan (Philippines) Eric Taino	6–3, 6–4
6.	2001	Gramado Challenger, Gramado, Brazil	Hard	(Israel) Andy Ram	(Brazil) Adriano Ferreira (Brazil) Daniel Melo	6–4, 6–4
7.	2002	Bristol Challenger, Bristol, Great Britain	Grass	(Pakistan) Aisam-ul-Haq Qureshi	(Italy) Daniele Bracciali (Italy) Gianluca Pozzi	6–3, 6–2
8.	2002	Gramado Challenger, Gramado, Brazil	Hard	(Brazil) Alessandro Guevara	(Russia) Denis Golovanov (United States) Michael Joyce	3–6, 7–5, 6–2
