= 2005 Davis Cup Europe/Africa Zone Group II =

International tennis competition

The Europe/Africa Zone was one of the three zones of the regional Davis Cup competition in 2005.

In the Europe/Africa Zone there were four different tiers, called groups, in which teams competed against each other to advance to the upper tier. Winners in Group II advanced to the Europe/Africa Zone Group I. Teams who lost their respective ties competed in the relegation play-offs, with winning teams remaining in Group II, whereas teams who lost their play-offs were relegated to the Europe/Africa Zone Group III in 2006.

== Participating nations ==
- Algeria
- Bulgaria
- Ivory Coast
- Estonia
- Finland
- Georgia
- Ghana
- Greece
- Hungary
- Latvia
- Monaco
- Norway
- Poland
- Portugal
- Slovenia
- Ukraine

=== Draw ===
Relegation Play-offs
Accra, Ghana (hard)
Ghana	2
Georgia	3
Oslo, Norway (clay)
Monaco	1
Norway	4
Gdynia, Poland (clay)
Estonia	0
S	Poland	5
Athens, Greece (clay)
Ivory Coast	0
S	Greece	5

First Round
Accra, Ghana (hard)
Ghana	0
S	Finland	5
Sofia, Bulgaria (indoor carpet)
S	Bulgaria	4
Georgia	1
Hódmezővásárhely, Hungary (ind. hard)
S	Hungary	4
Monaco	1
Kyiv, Ukraine (indoor carpet)
S	Ukraine	4
Norway	1
Tallinn, Estonia (indoor carpet)
Estonia	1
S	Portugal	4
Algiers, Algeria (clay)
Algeria	3
S	Poland	2
Kranj, Slovenia (indoor hard)
Ivory Coast	0
S	Slovenia	5
Jūrmala, Latvia (indoor carpet)
Latvia	4
S	Greece	1

Second Round
Helsinki, Finland (clay)
S	Finland	2
S	Bulgaria	3
Donetsk, Ukraine (hard)
S	Hungary	2
S	Ukraine	3
Lisbon, Portugal (clay)
S	Portugal	3
Algeria	2
Kranj, Slovenia (clay)
S	Slovenia	5
Latvia	0

Third Round
Donetsk, Ukraine (hard)
S	Bulgaria	1
S	Ukraine	4
Estoril, Portugal (clay)
S	Portugal	4
S	Slovenia	1

- Georgia, Monaco, Estonia, and Côte d'Ivoire relegated to Group III in 2006.
- Ukraine and Portugal promoted to Group I in 2006.

== First round ==
=== Ghana vs. Finland ===
Ghana
0
Accra Sports Stadium Tennis Court, Accra, Ghana
4–6 March 2005
Hard

Finland
5

			1	2	3	4	5
1	(Ghana) (Finland)	Mohammed Salifu; Jarkko Nieminen	1; 6	2; 6	1; 6
2	(Ghana) (Finland)	Henry Adjei-Darko; Tuomas Ketola	6^{4} 7^{7}	7; 5	1; 6	0; 4		retired
3	(Ghana) (Finland)	Henry Adjei-Darko / Gunther Darkey; Lauri Kiiski / Jarkko Nieminen	6; 3	6^{3} 7^{7}	4; 6	6^{5} 7^{7}
4	(Ghana) (Finland)	Henry Adjei-Darko; Jarkko Nieminen	2; 6	4; 6
5	(Ghana) (Finland)	Mohammed Salifu; Tuomas Ketola	1; 6	3; 6

=== Bulgaria vs. Georgia ===
Bulgaria
4
Sofia, Bulgaria
4–6 March 2005
Carpet (indoors)

Georgia
1

			1	2	3	4	5
1	(Bulgaria) (Georgia (country))	Ivaylo Traykov; Lado Chikhladze	6^{5} 7^{7}	6; 3	6^{3} 7^{7}	3; 6
2	(Bulgaria) (Georgia (country))	Todor Enev; Irakli Ushangishvili	6; 2	6; 3	6; 2
3	(Bulgaria) (Georgia (country))	Yordan Kanev / Ilia Kushev; Lado Chikhladze / Irakli Ushangishvili	6; 4	3; 6	6; 4	6; 4
4	(Bulgaria) (Georgia (country))	Todor Enev; Lado Chikhladze	6; 1	6; 2	5; 7	6; 4
5	(Bulgaria) (Georgia (country))	Ivaylo Traykov; David Kvernadze	6; 2	6^{7} 7^{9}	7^{7} 6^{0}

=== Hungary vs. Monaco ===
Hungary
4
Hód TC, Hódmezővásárhely, Hungary
4–6 March 2005
Hard (indoors)

Monaco
1

			1	2	3	4	5
1	(Hungary) (Monaco)	Gergely Kisgyörgy; Benjamin Balleret	6; 4	2; 6	6; 4	4; 6	6; 1
2	(Hungary) (Monaco)	Sebő Kiss; Emmanuel Heussner	7^{10} 6^{8}	5; 7	6; 2	7^{7} 6^{2}
3	(Hungary) (Monaco)	Gergely Kisgyörgy / Sebő Kiss; Benjamin Balleret / Guillaume Couillard	6; 1	6; 4	6; 0
4	(Hungary) (Monaco)	Ádám Kellner; Guillaume Couillard	6; 4	4; 6	3; 6
5	(Hungary) (Monaco)	Dénes Lukács; Thomas Drouet	6; 4	6; 2

=== Ukraine vs. Norway ===
Ukraine
4
International Tennis Club "NAUKA", Kyiv, Ukraine
4–6 March 2005
Carpet (indoors)

Norway
1

			1	2	3	4	5
1	(Ukraine) (Norway)	Sergei Bubka; Jan Frode Andersen	6^{5} 7^{7}	3; 6	5; 7
2	(Ukraine) (Norway)	Orest Tereshchuk; Stian Boretti	7; 5	6^{5} 7^{7}	6; 4	6^{4} 7^{7}	6; 2
3	(Ukraine) (Norway)	Mikhail Filima / Orest Tereshchuk; Jan Frode Andersen / Stian Boretti	6; 1	6; 3	6^{4} 7^{7}	4; 6	10; 8
4	(Ukraine) (Norway)	Mikhail Filima; Jan Frode Andersen	2; 6	6^{2} 7^{7}	6; 2	7^{8} 6^{6}	8; 6
5	(Ukraine) (Norway)	Sergei Bubka; Marius Tangen	7; 5	6; 1

=== Estonia vs. Portugal ===
Estonia
1
Kadrioru Tennisekeskus (Kadrioru Tennis Center), Tallinn, Estonia
4–6 March 2005
Carpet (indoors)

Portugal
4

			1	2	3	4	5
1	(Estonia) (Portugal)	Mait Künnap; Fred Gil	6^{7} 7^{9}	4; 6	2; 6
2	(Estonia) (Portugal)	Alti Vahkal; Leonardo Tavares	6; 3	6; 2	2; 6	6^{5} 7^{7}	4; 6
3	(Estonia) (Portugal)	Mait Künnap / Alti Vahkal; Fred Gil / Leonardo Tavares	3; 6	4; 6	4; 6
4	(Estonia) (Portugal)	Andrei Luzgin; Rui Machado	5; 7	6; 4	6; 3
5	(Estonia) (Portugal)	Oskar Saarne; Diogo Rocha	3; 6	2; 6

=== Algeria vs. Poland ===
Algeria
3
Fosses Olympique du Complexe Mohamed Boudiaf, Algiers, Algeria
4–6 March 2005
Clay

Poland
2

			1	2	3	4	5
1	(Algeria) (Poland)	Lamine Ouahab; Łukasz Kubot	2; 6	6^{4} 7^{7}	1; 6
2	(Algeria) (Poland)	Slimane Saoudi; Mariusz Fyrstenberg	3; 6	6; 3	7^{7} 6^{2}	6; 4
3	(Algeria) (Poland)	Lamine Ouahab / Slimane Saoudi; Mariusz Fyrstenberg / Marcin Matkowski	7^{7} 6^{2}	6; 4	3; 6	6; 3
4	(Algeria) (Poland)	Slimane Saoudi; Łukasz Kubot	7; 5	6; 1	2; 6	3; 6	0; 6
5	(Algeria) (Poland)	Lamine Ouahab; Filip Urban	6; 2	6; 3	6; 4

=== Slovenia vs. Ivory Coast ===
Slovenia
5
Teniski Klub Triglav, Kranj, Slovenia
4–6 March 2005
Hard (indoors)

Ivory Coast
0

			1	2	3	4	5
1	(Slovenia) (Ivory Coast)	Grega Žemlja; Valentin Sanon	6; 4	6; 4	7; 5
2	(Slovenia) (Ivory Coast)	Boštjan Ošabnik; Claude N'Goran	6; 1	6; 0	2; 6	6^{5} 7^{7}	6; 2
3	(Slovenia) (Ivory Coast)	Rok Jarc / Grega Žemlja; Claude N'Goran / Valentin Sanon	6; 2	6; 2				retired
4	(Slovenia) (Ivory Coast)	Luka Gregorc; Valentin Sanon	6; 4	6; 3
5	(Slovenia) (Ivory Coast)	Rok Jarc; Terence Nugent	6; 2	6; 0

=== Latvia vs. Greece ===
Latvia
4
Tennis Centre "Lielupe", Jūrmala, Latvia
4–6 March 2005
Carpet (indoors)

Greece
1

			1	2	3	4	5
1	(Latvia) (Greece)	Andis Juška; Konstantinos Economidis	7^{7} 6^{3}	7^{7} 6^{2}	2; 6	6; 2
2	(Latvia) (Greece)	Ernests Gulbis; Vasilis Mazarakis	3; 6	4; 6	3; 6
3	(Latvia) (Greece)	Andis Juška / Deniss Pavlovs; Konstantinos Economidis / Vasilis Mazarakis	5; 7	4; 6	6; 3	6; 4	6; 4
4	(Latvia) (Greece)	Andis Juška; Vasilis Mazarakis	6; 2	6; 3	7; 5
5	(Latvia) (Greece)	Deniss Pavlovs; Alexandros Jakoubovits	6; 1	6; 2

== Second round ==
=== Finland vs. Bulgaria ===
Finland
2
Taivallahti Tennis Centre, Helsinki, Finland
15–17 July 2005
Clay

Bulgaria
3

			1	2	3	4	5
1	(Finland) (Bulgaria)	Tuomas Ketola; Todor Enev	6; 3	4; 6	1; 6	6; 3	6; 8
2	(Finland) (Bulgaria)	Jarkko Nieminen; Radoslav Lukaev	7^{7} 6^{4}	6; 3	6; 2
3	(Finland) (Bulgaria)	Lauri Kiiski / Jarkko Nieminen; Ilia Kushev / Radoslav Lukaev	5; 7	3; 6	7^{7} 6^{5}	3; 6
4	(Finland) (Bulgaria)	Jarkko Nieminen; Ilia Kushev	6; 3	7; 5	6; 2
5	(Finland) (Bulgaria)	Tuomas Ketola; Radoslav Lukaev	6^{5} 7^{7}	4; 6	1; 6

=== Ukraine vs. Hungary ===
Ukraine
3
Tennis Club 'Viccourt', Donetsk, Ukraine
15–17 July 2005
Hard

Hungary
2

			1	2	3	4	5
1	(Ukraine) (Hungary)	Sergei Yaroshenko; Gergely Kisgyörgy	6; 3	6; 4	6^{4} 7^{7}	6; 3
2	(Ukraine) (Hungary)	Orest Tereshchuk; Kornél Bardóczky	6; 4	6; 2	3; 6	2; 6	6; 3
3	(Ukraine) (Hungary)	Mikhail Filima / Orest Tereshchuk; Kornél Bardóczky / Gergely Kisgyörgy	6^{3} 7^{7}	7^{7} 6^{2}	6; 4	6; 4
4	(Ukraine) (Hungary)	Mikhail Filima; Kornél Bardóczky	6; 3	6^{6} 7^{8}	6^{5} 7^{7}
5	(Ukraine) (Hungary)	Oleksandr Nedovyesov; Sebő Kiss	6^{4} 7^{7}	7^{7} 6^{5}	4; 6

=== Portugal vs. Algeria ===
Portugal
3
Estádio Nacional, Lisbon, Portugal
15–17 July 2005
Clay

Algeria
2

			1	2	3	4	5
1	(Portugal) (Algeria)	Rui Machado; Slimane Saoudi	6; 4	0; 6	6; 3	6^{3} 7^{7}	4; 6
2	(Portugal) (Algeria)	Fred Gil; Lamine Ouahab	6^{2} 7^{7}	4; 6	3; 6
3	(Portugal) (Algeria)	Fred Gil / Leonardo Tavares; Abdelhak Hameurlaïne / Slimane Saoudi	6^{3} 7^{7}	6; 3	6; 1	7^{7} 6^{3}
4	(Portugal) (Algeria)	Rui Machado; Lamine Ouahab	6; 4	6; 2	6; 2
5	(Portugal) (Algeria)	Fred Gil; Slimane Saoudi	4; 6	6^{5} 7^{7}	6; 0	6; 2	6; 2

=== Slovenia vs. Latvia ===
Slovenia
5
Teniski Klub Triglav, Kranj, Slovenia
15–17 July 2005
Clay

Latvia
0

			1	2	3	4	5
1	(Slovenia) (Latvia)	Marko Tkalec; Andis Juška	6; 1	6; 3	6; 4
2	(Slovenia) (Latvia)	Grega Žemlja; Ernests Gulbis	5; 7	6; 3	6; 1	6; 4
3	(Slovenia) (Latvia)	Rok Jarc / Boštjan Ošabnik; Ernests Gulbis / Andis Juška	6; 2	7^{7} 6^{4}	4; 6	6; 2
4	(Slovenia) (Latvia)	Boštjan Ošabnik; Deniss Pavlovs	6; 1	3; 6	6; 0
5	(Slovenia) (Latvia)	Rok Jarc; Jānis Skroderis	6; 4	6; 2

== Relegation play-offs ==
=== Ghana vs. Georgia ===
Ghana
2
Ohene Djan Sports Stadium, Accra, Ghana
15–17 July 2005
Hard

Georgia
3

			1	2	3	4	5
1	(Ghana) (Georgia (country))	Gunther Darkey; Irakli Labadze	2; 6	2; 6	1; 6
2	(Ghana) (Georgia (country))	Henry Adjei-Darko; Lado Chikhladze	7^{9} 6^{7}	6; 2	6; 2
3	(Ghana) (Georgia (country))	Henry Adjei-Darko / Gunther Darkey; Lado Chikhladze / Irakli Labadze	6; 4	3; 6	3; 6	4; 6
4	(Ghana) (Georgia (country))	Henry Adjei-Darko; Irakli Labadze	4; 6	3; 6	1; 6
5	(Ghana) (Georgia (country))	Mohammed Salifu; Irakli Ushangishvili	4; 6	7; 5	6; 3

=== Norway vs. Monaco ===
Norway
4
Oslo Tennisklubb, Oslo, Norway
15–17 July 2005
Clay

Monaco
1

			1	2	3	4	5
1	(Norway) (Monaco)	Stian Boretti; Benjamin Balleret	3; 6	2; 6	6; 3	5; 7
2	(Norway) (Monaco)	Jan Frode Andersen; Guillaume Couillard	6; 2	6; 4	6^{4} 7^{7}	7^{7} 6^{5}
3	(Norway) (Monaco)	Jan Frode Andersen / Stian Boretti; Thomas Drouet / Emmanuel Heussner	3; 6	6; 2	6; 1	6; 2
4	(Norway) (Monaco)	Jan Frode Andersen; Benjamin Balleret	6; 2	6; 2	6; 4
5	(Norway) (Monaco)	Stian Boretti; Guillaume Couillard	6; 4	6; 1

=== Poland vs. Estonia ===
Poland
5
Klub Tenisowy ARKA, Gdynia, Poland
15–17 July 2005
Clay

Estonia
0

			1	2	3	4	5
1	(Poland) (Estonia)	Łukasz Kubot; Jaak Põldma	6; 0	6; 1	7^{9} 6^{7}
2	(Poland) (Estonia)	Adam Chadaj; Mait Künnap	6; 3	6; 3	6; 4
3	(Poland) (Estonia)	Mariusz Fyrstenberg / Łukasz Kubot; Mihkel Koppel / Mait Künnap	6; 3	6; 4	6; 3
4	(Poland) (Estonia)	Michał Przysiężny; Mait Künnap	2; 6	6; 3	6; 2
5	(Poland) (Estonia)	Adam Chadaj; Mikk Irdoja	6; 2	6; 1

=== Greece vs. Ivory Coast ===
Greece
5
Helioupolis Tennis Club, Athens, Greece
15–17 July 2005
Clay

Ivory Coast
0

			1	2	3	4	5
1	(Greece) (Ivory Coast)	Konstantinos Economidis; Valentin Sanon	6; 4	6; 3	6; 2
2	(Greece) (Ivory Coast)	Vasilis Mazarakis; Claude N'Goran	6; 2	7^{7} 6^{1}	6^{3} 7^{7}	6; 0
3	(Greece) (Ivory Coast)	Konstantinos Economidis / Vasilis Mazarakis; Claude N'Goran / Valentin Sanon	3; 6	6^{8} 7^{10}	6; 0	6; 3	6; 4
4	(Greece) (Ivory Coast)	Nikos Rovas; Charles Irie	6; 1	6; 1
5	(Greece) (Ivory Coast)	Alexandros Jakoubovits; Terence Nugent	6; 4	3; 6	6; 1

== Third round ==
=== Ukraine vs. Bulgaria ===
Ukraine
4
Tennis Club 'Viccourt', Donetsk, Ukraine
23–25 September 2005
Hard

Bulgaria
1

			1	2	3	4	5
1	(Ukraine) (Bulgaria)	Orest Tereshchuk; Todor Enev	6; 2	6; 4	6; 3
2	(Ukraine) (Bulgaria)	Sergei Yaroshenko; Radoslav Lukaev	4; 6	4; 6	6^{4} 7^{7}
3	(Ukraine) (Bulgaria)	Mikhail Filima / Orest Tereshchuk; Ilia Kushev / Radoslav Lukaev	6; 4	6; 2	7^{7} 6^{3}
4	(Ukraine) (Bulgaria)	Mikhail Filima; Todor Enev	6; 4	6; 4	6; 3
5	(Ukraine) (Bulgaria)	Sergei Bubka; Yordan Kanev	6^{7} 7^{9}	6; 4	6; 3

=== Portugal vs. Slovenia ===
Portugal
4
Clube de Ténis do Estoril, Estoril, Portugal
23–25 September 2005
Clay

Slovenia
1

			1	2	3	4	5
1	(Portugal) (Slovenia)	Fred Gil; Boštjan Ošabnik	7^{7} 6^{3}	6; 1	6; 1
2	(Portugal) (Slovenia)	Rui Machado; Marko Tkalec	3; 6	6; 4	7^{7} 6^{5}	1; 6	3; 6
3	(Portugal) (Slovenia)	Fred Gil / Leonardo Tavares; Rok Jarc / Grega Žemlja	6; 4	6; 2	6; 4
4	(Portugal) (Slovenia)	Rui Machado; Grega Žemlja	6; 3	6; 3	2; 6	6; 4
5	(Portugal) (Slovenia)	Leonardo Tavares; Marko Tkalec	6; 4	7; 5
