= 2006 Davis Cup Europe/Africa Zone Group II =

International tennis competition

The European and African Zone was one of the three zones of regional Davis Cup competition in 2006.

In the Europe/Africa Zone there were four different tiers, called groups, in which teams competed against each other to advance to the upper tier. Winners in Group II advanced to the Europe/Africa Zone Group I. Teams who lost their respective ties competed in the relegation play-offs, with winning teams remaining in Group II, whereas teams who lost their play-offs were relegated to the Europe/Africa Zone Group III in 2007.

== Participating nations ==
- Algeria
- Bulgaria
- Cyprus
- Egypt
- Finland
- Georgia
- Greece
- Hungary
- Ireland
- Latvia
- North Macedonia
- Norway
- Poland
- Slovenia
- South Africa
- Zimbabwe

=== Draw ===
Relegation Play-offs
Thessaloniki, Greece (clay)
Zimbabwe	1
S	Greece	4
Dublin, Ireland (grass)
Ireland	1
S	Slovenia	4
Cairo, Egypt (clay)
S	Egypt	2
Cyprus	3
Jūrmala, Latvia (clay)
Latvia	3
S	South Africa	2

First Round
Harare, Zimbabwe (hard)
S	Zimbabwe	1
Norway	4
Athens, Greece (clay)
S	Greece	1
North Macedonia	4
Helsinki, Finland (indoor hard)
S	Finland	3
Ireland	2
Algiers, Algeria (clay)
S	Slovenia	2
Algeria	3
Hódmezővásárhely, Hungary (indoor hard)
Egypt	0
S	Hungary	5
Plovdiv, Bulgaria (clay)
Cyprus	2
S	Bulgaria	3
Poznań, Poland (indoor carpet)
Latvia	0
S	Poland	5
Tbilisi, Georgia (indoor carpet)
Georgia	3
S	South Africa	2

Second Round
Oslo, Norway (clay)
S	Norway	2
North Macedonia	3
Hanko, Finland (clay)
S	Finland	4
Algeria	1
Plovdiv, Bulgaria (clay)
Hungary	3
S	Bulgaria	2
Gdynia, Poland (clay)
S	Poland	2
Georgia	3

Third Round
Skopje, North Macedonia (clay)
North Macedonia	3
S	Finland	2
Budapest, Hungary (clay)
S	Hungary	2
Georgia	3

- Zimbabwe, Ireland, Egypt, and South Africa relegated to Group III in 2007.
- North Macedonia and Georgia promoted to Group I in 2007.

== First round ==
=== Zimbabwe vs. Norway ===
Zimbabwe
1
Harare Sports Club, Harare, Zimbabwe
7–9 April 2006
Hard

Norway
4

			1	2	3	4	5
1	(Zimbabwe) (Norway)	Genius Chidzikwe; Jan Frode Andersen	4; 6	2; 6	7; 5	6^{3} 7^{7}
2	(Zimbabwe) (Norway)	Gwinyai Tongoona; Stian Boretti	0; 6	3; 6	3; 6
3	(Zimbabwe) (Norway)	Genius Chidzikwe / Gwinyai Tongoona; Jan Frode Andersen / Stian Boretti	6; 3	6; 2	3; 6	6; 4
4	(Zimbabwe) (Norway)	Genius Chidzikwe; Stian Boretti	6; 4	5; 7	5; 7	6; 3	3; 6
5	(Zimbabwe) (Norway)	Stefan D'Almeida; Carl Sundberg	3; 6	1; 6

=== Greece vs. North Macedonia ===
Greece
1
Athens Lawn Tennis Club, Athens, Greece
7–9 April 2006
Clay

North Macedonia
4

			1	2	3	4	5
1	(Greece) (North Macedonia)	Konstantinos Economidis; Predrag Rusevski	7^{7} 6^{5}	5; 7	6; 4	6^{5} 7^{7}	6; 4
2	(Greece) (North Macedonia)	Alexandros Jakupovic; Lazar Magdinčev	6^{4} 7^{7}	0; 6	2; 6
3	(Greece) (North Macedonia)	Alexandros Jakupovic / Nikos Rovas; Lazar Magdinčev / Predrag Rusevski	6; 3	3; 6	4; 6	2; 6
4	(Greece) (North Macedonia)	Nikos Rovas; Lazar Magdinčev	2; 6	6^{3} 7^{7}	1; 6
5	(Greece) (North Macedonia)	Paris Gemouchidis; Predrag Rusevski	1; 6	6^{3} 7^{7}

=== Finland vs. Ireland ===
Finland
3
Tali Tennis Center, Helsinki, Finland
7–9 April 2006
Hard (indoors)

Ireland
2

			1	2	3	4	5
1	(Finland) (Republic of Ireland)	Jarkko Nieminen; Kevin Sorensen	6; 4	6; 4	6; 2
2	(Finland) (Republic of Ireland)	Juho Paukku; Louk Sorensen	4; 6	2; 6	3; 6
3	(Finland) (Republic of Ireland)	Tuomas Ketola / Jarkko Nieminen; Tristan Farron-Mahon / Kevin Sorensen	6; 0	6; 3	6; 2
4	(Finland) (Republic of Ireland)	Jarkko Nieminen; Louk Sorensen	6; 4	6; 1	6; 0
5	(Finland) (Republic of Ireland)	Juho Paukku; Kevin Sorensen	4; 6	2; 6

=== Algeria vs. Slovenia ===
Algeria
3
Office du complexe Olympique Mohamed Boudiaf, Algiers, Algeria
7–9 April 2006
Clay

Slovenia
2

			1	2	3	4	5
1	(Algeria) (Slovenia)	Slimane Saoudi; Rok Jarc	6; 4	6; 4	3; 6	6; 1
2	(Algeria) (Slovenia)	Lamine Ouahab; Grega Žemlja	6; 3	2; 6	4; 6	6; 3	6; 4
3	(Algeria) (Slovenia)	Lamine Ouahab / Slimane Saoudi; Rok Jarc / Grega Žemlja	6; 2	6; 2	6; 4
4	(Algeria) (Slovenia)	Slimane Saoudi; Grega Žemlja	5; 7	2; 6
5	(Algeria) (Slovenia)	Rachid Baba-Aïssa; Blaž Kavčič	0; 6	1; 6

=== Hungary vs. Egypt ===
Hungary
5
Hód TC, Hódmezővásárhely, Hungary
7–9 April 2006
Hard (indoors)

Egypt
0

			1	2	3	4	5
1	(Hungary) (Egypt)	Sebő Kiss; Karim Maamoun	6; 3	6; 4	6; 1
2	(Hungary) (Egypt)	Kornél Bardóczky; Sherif Sabry	7^{7} 6^{4}	6; 1	6; 3
3	(Hungary) (Egypt)	Kornél Bardóczky / Gergely Kisgyörgy; Karim Maamoun / Mohamed Mamoun	6; 4	7^{7} 6^{5}	6; 4
4	(Hungary) (Egypt)	Kornél Bardóczky; Mohamed Mamoun	7; 5	6; 3
5	(Hungary) (Egypt)	Sebő Kiss; Sherif Sabry	6; 4	6; 3

=== Bulgaria vs. Cyprus ===
Bulgaria
3
TC Lokomotiv Plovdiv, Plovdiv, Bulgaria
7–9 April 2006
Clay

Cyprus
2

			1	2	3	4	5
1	(Bulgaria) (Cyprus)	Yordan Kanev; Marcos Baghdatis	1; 6	2; 6	2; 6
2	(Bulgaria) (Cyprus)	Ilia Kushev; Photos Kallias	6; 3	6; 2	7; 5
3	(Bulgaria) (Cyprus)	Ilia Kushev / Ivaylo Traykov; Marcos Baghdatis / Photos Kallias	4; 6	6; 3	2; 6	7^{7} 6^{1}	6; 0
4	(Bulgaria) (Cyprus)	Ilia Kushev; Marcos Baghdatis	3; 6	2; 6	2; 6
5	(Bulgaria) (Cyprus)	Todor Enev; Photos Kallias	7^{7} 6^{2}	6; 1	1; 6	6; 4

=== Poland vs. Latvia ===
Poland
5
Centrum Tenisowe ANGIE Sp.z.o.o., Puszczykowo, Poznań County, Poland
7–9 April 2006
Carpet (indoors)

Latvia
0

			1	2	3	4	5
1	(Poland) (Latvia)	Michał Przysiężny; Ernests Gulbis	3; 6	7^{8} 6^{6}	7^{7} 6^{4}	7^{9} 6^{7}
2	(Poland) (Latvia)	Łukasz Kubot; Andis Juška	6; 4	7^{7} 6^{3}	6^{6} 7^{8}	3; 6	8; 6
3	(Poland) (Latvia)	Mariusz Fyrstenberg / Marcin Matkowski; Ernests Gulbis / Andis Juška	6; 3	7^{7} 6^{4}	6; 1
4	(Poland) (Latvia)	Mariusz Fyrstenberg; Deniss Pavlovs	6; 3	6; 2
5	(Poland) (Latvia)	Michał Przysiężny; Kārlis Lejnieks	6; 2	7^{7} 6^{1}

=== Georgia vs. South Africa ===
Georgia
3
Tbilisi Sports Palace, Tbilisi, Georgia
7–9 April 2006
Carpet (indoors)

South Africa
2

			1	2	3	4	5
1	(Georgia (country)) (South Africa)	Irakli Labadze; Izak van der Merwe	6; 4	5; 7	3; 6	6; 1	6; 3
2	(Georgia (country)) (South Africa)	Lado Chikhladze; Wesley Moodie	6^{7} 7^{9}	7^{7} 6^{2}	6; 4	6^{5} 7^{7}	3; 6
3	(Georgia (country)) (South Africa)	Lado Chikhladze / Irakli Labadze; Jeff Coetzee / Wesley Moodie	6; 4	6; 4	7^{7} 6^{4}
4	(Georgia (country)) (South Africa)	Irakli Labadze; Wesley Moodie	5; 7	6; 4	6; 4	3; 6	11; 13
5	(Georgia (country)) (South Africa)	Lado Chikhladze; Izak van der Merwe	6; 2	6; 4	6; 3

== Second round ==
=== Norway vs. North Macedonia ===
Norway
2
Oslo Tennisklubb, Oslo, Norway
21–23 July 2006
Clay

North Macedonia
3

			1	2	3	4	5
1	(Norway) (North Macedonia)	Stian Boretti; Predrag Rusevski	2; 6	0; 6	0; 1			retired
2	(Norway) (North Macedonia)	Jan Frode Andersen; Lazar Magdinčev	4; 6	6; 3	7; 5	3; 6	6; 2
3	(Norway) (North Macedonia)	Jan Frode Andersen / Erling Tveit; Lazar Magdinčev / Predrag Rusevski	4; 6	6^{5} 7^{7}	3; 6
4	(Norway) (North Macedonia)	Erling Tveit; Lazar Magdinčev	4; 6	7; 5	2; 6	7^{7} 6^{4}	2; 6
5	(Norway) (North Macedonia)	Carl Sundberg; Dimitar Grabuloski	7^{7} 6^{4}	6; 4

=== Finland vs. Algeria ===
Finland
4
Hanko Tennis Stadion, Hanko, Finland
21–23 July 2006
Clay

Algeria
1

			1	2	3	4	5
1	(Finland) (Algeria)	Timo Nieminen; Slimane Saoudi	7^{8} 6^{6}	7^{7} 6^{5}	6; 3
2	(Finland) (Algeria)	Jarkko Nieminen; Abdelhak Hameurlaïne	6; 0	6; 0	6; 1
3	(Finland) (Algeria)	Tuomas Ketola / Jarkko Nieminen; Abdelhak Hameurlaïne / Slimane Saoudi	6; 1	3; 6	6; 2	6; 4
4	(Finland) (Algeria)	Jarkko Nieminen; Slimane Saoudi	6; 2	6; 1
5	(Finland) (Algeria)	Lauri Kiiski; Abdelhak Hameurlaïne	4; 6	2; 6

=== Bulgaria vs. Hungary ===
Bulgaria
2
TC Lokomotiv Plovdiv, Plovdiv, Bulgaria
21–23 July 2006
Clay

Hungary
3

			1	2	3	4	5
1	(Bulgaria) (Hungary)	Ilia Kushev; Kornél Bardóczky	5; 7	3; 6	0; 6
2	(Bulgaria) (Hungary)	Ivaylo Traykov; Sebő Kiss	3; 6	3; 6	3; 6
3	(Bulgaria) (Hungary)	Yordan Kanev / Ivaylo Traykov; Kornél Bardóczky / Gergely Kisgyörgy	6; 4	4; 6	4; 6	7^{7} 6^{3}	9; 11
4	(Bulgaria) (Hungary)	Todor Enev; Dénes Lukács	6; 3	7; 5
5	(Bulgaria) (Hungary)	Ilia Kushev; Sebő Kiss	7; 5	1; 6	6; 2

=== Poland vs. Georgia ===
Poland
2
Klub Tenisowy ARKA, Gdynia, Poland
21–23 July 2006
Clay

Georgia
3

			1	2	3	4	5
1	(Poland) (Georgia (country))	Michał Przysiężny; Irakli Labadze	6; 3	3; 6	4; 6	4; 6
2	(Poland) (Georgia (country))	Łukasz Kubot; Lado Chikhladze	7; 5	6; 4	6; 2
3	(Poland) (Georgia (country))	Mariusz Fyrstenberg / Marcin Matkowski; Lado Chikhladze / Irakli Labadze	6; 1	6; 2	6; 4
4	(Poland) (Georgia (country))	Łukasz Kubot; Irakli Labadze	6; 4	3; 6	7; 5	2; 6	4; 6
5	(Poland) (Georgia (country))	Mariusz Fyrstenberg; Lado Chikhladze	5; 7	6^{3} 7^{7}	6^{6} 7^{8}

== Relegation play-offs ==
=== Greece vs. Zimbabwe ===
Greece
4
Salonica Country Club, Thessaloniki, Greece
21–23 July 2006
Clay

Zimbabwe
1

			1	2	3	4	5
1	(Greece) (Zimbabwe)	Konstantinos Economidis; Pfungwa Mahefu	6; 2	6; 0	6; 0
2	(Greece) (Zimbabwe)	Alexandros Jakupovic; Genius Chidzikwe	6^{3} 7^{7}	6; 1	7; 5	6; 2
3	(Greece) (Zimbabwe)	Konstantinos Economidis / Alexandros Jakupovic; Genius Chidzikwe / Gwinyai Tongoona	6; 2	6; 1	6; 2
4	(Greece) (Zimbabwe)	Paris Gemouchidis; Genius Chidzikwe	2; 6	4; 6
5	(Greece) (Zimbabwe)	Alexandros Jakupovic; Gwinyai Tongoona	6; 2	6; 2

=== Ireland vs. Slovenia ===
Ireland
1
Fitzwilliam Lawn Tennis Club, Dublin, Ireland
21–23 July 2006
Grass

Slovenia
4

			1	2	3	4	5
1	(Republic of Ireland) (Slovenia)	Kevin Sorensen; Grega Žemlja	2; 6	5; 7	1; 6
2	(Republic of Ireland) (Slovenia)	Conor Niland; Marko Tkalec	6; 4	2; 6	6; 4	4; 6	3; 6
3	(Republic of Ireland) (Slovenia)	James Cluskey / Kevin Sorensen; Luka Gregorc / Grega Žemlja	7^{9} 6^{7}	3; 6	6; 3	3; 6	5; 7
4	(Republic of Ireland) (Slovenia)	Conor Niland; Grega Žemlja	4; 6	2; 6
5	(Republic of Ireland) (Slovenia)	Stephen Nugent; Martin Rmuš	1; 6	7^{11} 6^{9}	6; 1

=== Egypt vs. Cyprus ===
Egypt
2
Heliopolis Sporting Club, Cairo, Egypt
21–23 July 2006
Clay

Cyprus
3

			1	2	3	4	5
1	(Egypt) (Cyprus)	Karim Maamoun; Christopher Koutrouza	6; 1	6; 2	6; 0
2	(Egypt) (Cyprus)	Mohamed Mamoun; Marcos Baghdatis	4; 6	3; 6	4; 6
3	(Egypt) (Cyprus)	Karim Maamoun / Mohamed Mamoun; Marcos Baghdatis / Photos Kallias	3; 6	3; 6	4; 6
4	(Egypt) (Cyprus)	Karim Maamoun; Marcos Baghdatis	3; 6	4; 6	3; 6
5	(Egypt) (Cyprus)	Sherif Sabry; Petros Baghdatis	6; 3	6; 2

=== Latvia vs. South Africa ===
Latvia
3
Tennis Centre 'Lielupe', Jūrmala, Latvia
21–23 July 2006
Clay

South Africa
2

			1	2	3	4	5
1	(Latvia) (South Africa)	Andis Juška; Rik de Voest	6^{3} 7^{7}	6; 1	6; 4	6; 2
2	(Latvia) (South Africa)	Ernests Gulbis; Fritz Wolmarans	7; 5	6; 2	6; 4
3	(Latvia) (South Africa)	Ernests Gulbis / Andis Juška; Chris Haggard / Izak van der Merwe	6; 2	4; 6	6; 3	6; 2
4	(Latvia) (South Africa)	Deniss Pavlovs; Izak van der Merwe	3; 6	4; 6
5	(Latvia) (South Africa)	Kārlis Lejnieks; Fritz Wolmarans	0; 6	0; 6

== Third round ==
=== North Macedonia vs. Finland ===
North Macedonia
3
Tennis Club JUG, Skopje, North Macedonia
22–24 September 2006
Clay

Finland
2

			1	2	3	4	5
1	(North Macedonia) (Finland)	Predrag Rusevski; Jarkko Nieminen	6; 4	1; 6	3; 6	6; 3	4; 6
2	(North Macedonia) (Finland)	Lazar Magdinčev; Timo Nieminen	6; 4	6; 2	2; 6	7^{7} 6^{1}
3	(North Macedonia) (Finland)	Lazar Magdinčev / Predrag Rusevski; Tuomas Ketola / Jarkko Nieminen	6; 3	6; 2	3; 6	1; 6	6; 2
4	(North Macedonia) (Finland)	Lazar Magdinčev; Jarkko Nieminen	3; 6	0; 6	1; 6
5	(North Macedonia) (Finland)	Predrag Rusevski; Timo Nieminen	6; 4	6; 4	2; 6	4; 6	6; 4

=== Hungary vs. Georgia ===
Hungary
2
Római Teniszakadémia, Budapest, Hungary
22–24 September 2006
Clay

Georgia
3

			1	2	3	4	5
1	(Hungary) (Georgia (country))	Sebő Kiss; Irakli Labadze	6; 1	6; 3	2; 6	6; 4
2	(Hungary) (Georgia (country))	Kornél Bardóczky; Lado Chikhladze	6; 4	6^{4} 7^{7}	6; 1	6; 2
3	(Hungary) (Georgia (country))	Kornél Bardóczky / Gergely Kisgyörgy; Lado Chikhladze / Irakli Labadze	6; 4	0; 6	3; 6	2; 6
4	(Hungary) (Georgia (country))	Kornél Bardóczky; Irakli Labadze	6^{4} 7^{7}	1; 6	7^{7} 6^{2}	6; 1	4; 6
5	(Hungary) (Georgia (country))	Sebő Kiss; Lado Chikhladze	6^{3} 7^{7}	6^{4} 7^{7}	7^{7} 6^{4}	2; 6
