= Radoslav Lukaev =

Bulgarian tennis player

Radoslav Lukaev Радослав Лукаев
- Country (sports): Bulgaria
- Born: 24 April 1982 (age 42); Burgas, Bulgaria
- Height: 1.89 m (6 ft 2 in)
- Turned pro: 2000
- Retired: 2005
- Plays: Right-handed
- Prize money: US$ 55,014

Singles
- Career record: 4–4
- Career titles: 0; 0 Challengers, 4 Futures
- Highest ranking: No. 229 (23 September 2002)

Grand Slam singles results
- Wimbledon: Q2 (2003)
- US Open: 1R (2002)

Doubles
- Career record: 3–2
- Career titles: 0; 1 Challengers, 2 Futures
- Highest ranking: No. 301 (5 May 2003)

Radoslav Lukaev (Bulgarian: Радослав Лукаев) (born 24 April 1982) is a former professional tennis player from Bulgaria.

Lukaev made it into his first Grand Slam event at the 2002 US Open, with wins over Éric Prodon, Jaroslav Levinský and Peter Luczak in the qualifiers. He met Russian Nikolay Davydenko in the first round and lost in four sets.

He played five Davis Cup ties for Bulgaria, winning seven of his 12 matches, with a 4–3 record in singles and 3–2 record in doubles. In 2005 he was called upon to play the fifth and deciding rubber against Finland's Tuomas Ketola and came out on top, in straight sets.

== Year-end rankings ==
Year	1999	2000	2001	2002	2003	2004	2005
Singles	1225	922	384	249	594	678	441
Doubles	1164	693	741	311	532	1277	495

== Challenger and Futures finals ==
=== Singles: 5 (4–1) ===
Legend (singles) ATP Challenger Tour (0–0) ITF Futures (4–1)	Titles by surface Hard (1–0) Clay (3–1) Grass (0–0) Carpet (0–0)

Result	W–L	Date	Tournament	Tier	Surface	Opponent	Score
Win	1–0	Aug 2001	Latvia F1, Jūrmala	Futures	Clay	(Poland) Mariusz Fyrstenberg	6–2, 0–6, 6–2
Win	2–0	Aug 2001	Lithuania F1, Vilnius	Futures	Clay	(Sweden) Jon Wallmark	7–6^{(7–3)}, 1–6, 6–3
Win	3–0	May 2002	Germany F3, Mannheim	Futures	Clay	(Germany) Jan Weinzierl	6–3, 1–6, 7–6^{(7–2)}
Loss	3–1	Jun 2002	France F11, Toulon	Futures	Clay	(Bulgaria) Orlin Stanoytchev	2–6, 6–0, 5–7
Win	4–1	Jun 2005	Turkey F3, Istanbul	Futures	Hard	(North Macedonia) Predrag Rusevski	6–2, 6–3

=== Doubles: 10 (3–7) ===
Legend (doubles) ATP Challenger Tour (1–2) ITF Futures (2–5)	Titles by surface Hard (1–1) Clay (1–6) Grass (0–0) Carpet (1–0)

Result	W–L	Date	Tournament	Tier	Surface	Partner	Opponents	Score
Loss	0–1	Sep 2000	Sofia, Bulgaria	Challenger	Clay	(Austria) Luben Pampoulov	(Australia) Dejan Petrovic (Bulgaria) Orlin Stanoytchev	2–6, 7–6^{(7–5)}, 6–7^{(6–8)}
Loss	0–2	Jul 2001	Macedonia F3, Skopje	Futures	Hard	(North Macedonia) Predrag Rusevski	(Bulgaria) Todor Enev (Bulgaria) Milen Velev	2–6, 5–7
Loss	0–3	Aug 2001	Lithuania F1, Vilnius	Futures	Clay	(Estonia) Mait Künnap	(Finland) Lauri Kiiski (Finland) Tero Vilen	2–6, 6–3, 5–7
Win	1–3	Mar 2002	France F8, Melun	Futures	Carpet (i)	(Poland) Mariusz Fyrstenberg	(Bulgaria) Todor Enev (Russia) Dmitry Vlasov	6–2, 6–2
Loss	1–4	May 2002	Germany F3, Mannheim	Futures	Clay	(Austria) Luben Pampoulov	(Germany) Florian Jeschonek (Slovakia) Ivo Klec	w/o
Loss	1–5	Jun 2002	Germany F7, Trier	Futures	Clay	(United States) Hamid Mirzadeh	(Portugal) Bernardo Mota (Argentina) Diego Moyano	6–1, 1–6, 4–6
Loss	1–6	Jun 2002	France F11, Toulon	Futures	Clay	(Uzbekistan) Dmitri Tomashevich	(France) Sylvain Charrier (France) John Thivolle	w/o
Win	2–6	May 2003	New Delhi, India	Challenger	Hard	(Russia) Dmitry Vlasov	(Israel) Jonathan Erlich (Israel) Andy Ram	7–6^{(8–6)}, 4–6, 6–2
Win	3–6	Jul 2002	Serbia and Montenegro F4, Belgrade	Futures	Clay	(Bulgaria) Todor Enev	(France) Stéphane Robert (France) Xavier Audouy	6–4, 6–7^{(7–9)}, 6–4
Loss	3–7	Aug 2005	Timișoara, Romania	Challenger	Clay	(Bulgaria) Ilia Kushev	(Romania) Ionuț Moldovan (Romania) Gabriel Moraru	2–6, 0–6

- w/o = Walkover

== Davis Cup ==
Radoslav Lukaev debuted for the Bulgaria Davis Cup team in 2000. Since then he has 5 nominations with 5 ties played, his singles W/L record is 4–3 and doubles W/L record is 3–2 (7–5 overall).

=== Singles (4–3) ===
Edition	Round	Date	Surface	Opponent	W/L	Result
2003 Europe/Africa Zone Group II	R1	4 April 2003	Carpet (I)	(Ukraine) Andrei Dernovskiy	W	6–3, 6–7^{(6–8)}, 6–3, 6–2
2003 Europe/Africa Zone Group II	R1	6 April 2003	Carpet (I)	(Ukraine) Orest Tereshchuk	L	6–3, 3–6, 6–7^{(7–9)}, 3–6
2003 Europe/Africa Zone Group II	QF	11 July 2003	Clay	(Serbia and Montenegro) Boris Pašanski	W	3–6, 6–4, 6–7^{(3–7)}, 6–4, 6–4
2003 Europe/Africa Zone Group II	QF	14 July 2003	Clay	(Serbia and Montenegro) Janko Tipsarević	L	3–6, 1–6, 3–6
2005 Europe/Africa Zone Group II	QF	15 July 2005	Clay	(Finland) Jarkko Nieminen	L	6–7^{(4–7)}, 3–6, 2–6
2005 Europe/Africa Zone Group II	QF	17 July 2005	Clay	(Finland) Tuomas Ketola	W	7–6^{(7–5)}, 6–4, 6–1
2005 Europe/Africa Zone Group II	SF	23 September 2005	Hard	(Ukraine) Sergei Yaroshenko	W	6–4, 6–4, 7–6^{(7–4)}

=== Doubles (3–2) ===
Edition	Round	Date	Partner	Surface	Opponents	W/L	Result
2000 Europe/Africa Zone Group II	RPO	22 July 2000	(Bulgaria) Todor Enev	Clay	(Israel) Jonathan Erlich (Israel) Harel Levy	W	6–4, 7–5, 7–6^{(7–5)}
2003 Europe/Africa Zone Group II	R1	5 April 2003	(Bulgaria) Todor Enev	Carpet (I)	(Ukraine) Andrei Dernovskiy (Ukraine) Orest Tereshchuk	W	6–3, 6–4, 6–4
2003 Europe/Africa Zone Group II	QF	13 July 2003	(Bulgaria) Todor Enev	Clay	(Serbia and Montenegro) Dejan Petrovic (Serbia and Montenegro) Nenad Zimonjić	L	3–6, 1–6, 2–6
2005 Europe/Africa Zone Group II	QF	16 July 2005	(Bulgaria) Ilia Kushev	Clay	(Finland) Jarkko Nieminen (Finland) Lauri Kiiski	W	7–5, 6–3, 6–7^{(5–7)}, 6–3
2005 Europe/Africa Zone Group II	SF	24 September 2005	(Bulgaria) Ilia Kushev	Hard	(Ukraine) Mikhail Filima (Ukraine) Orest Tereshchuk	L	4–6, 2–6, 6–7^{(3–7)}

- RPO = Relegation Play-off
