= Todor Enev =

Bulgarian tennis player (born 1982)

Todor Enev Тодор Енев
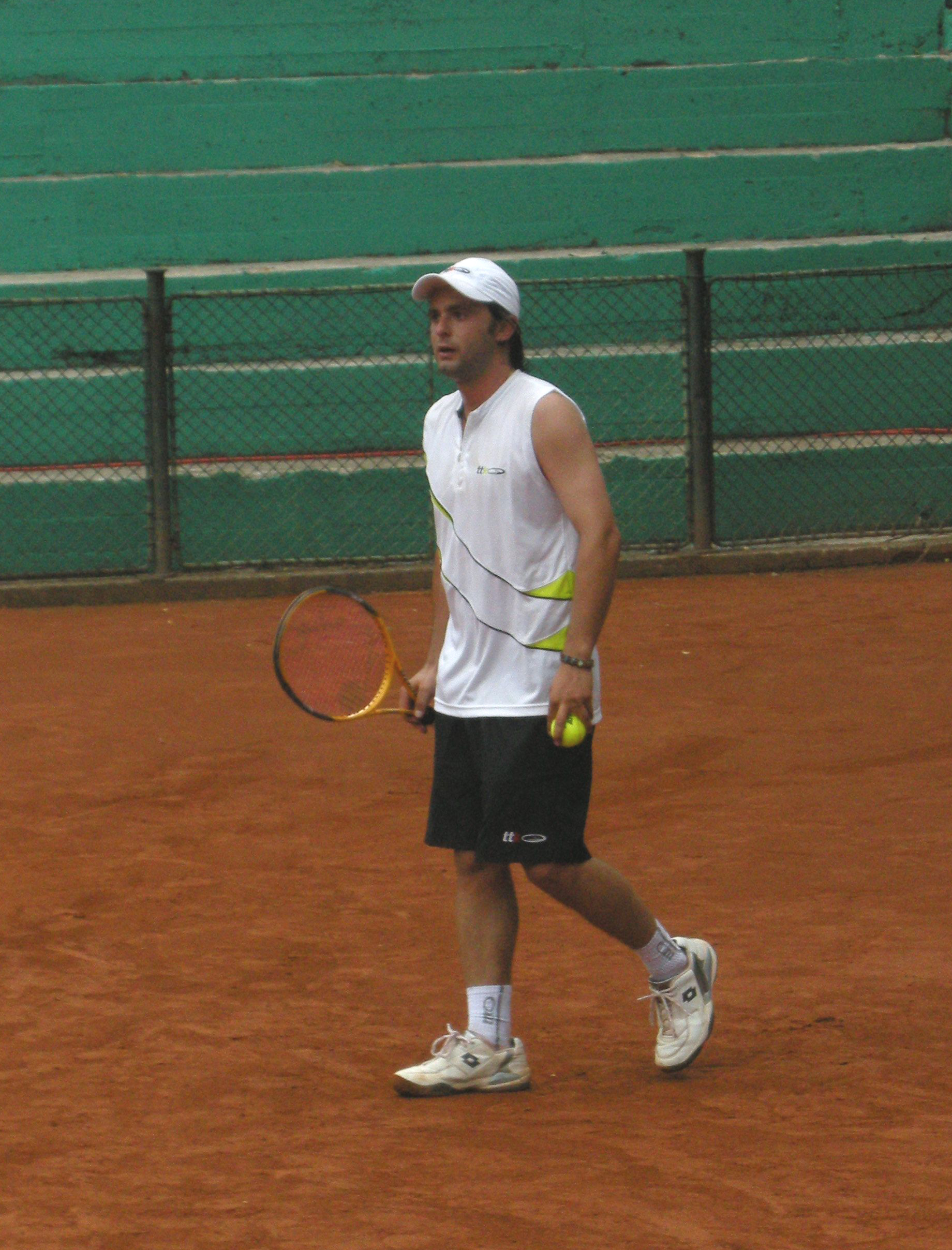
- Country (sports): Bulgaria
- Residence: Plovdiv, Bulgaria
- Born: 8 February 1982 (age 43); Plovdiv, Bulgaria
- Height: 1.74 m (5 ft 8 1/2 in)
- Turned pro: 1998
- Retired: 2012
- Plays: Right-handed (two-handed backhand)
- Prize money: US$ 93,577

Singles
- Career record: 9–12 (at ATP Tour level, Grand Slam level, and in Davis Cup)
- Career titles: 0
- Highest ranking: No. 252 (16 August 2004)

Grand Slam singles results
- US Open: Q1 (2004)

Doubles
- Career record: 3–6 (at ATP Tour level, Grand Slam level, and in Davis Cup)
- Career titles: 0
- Highest ranking: No. 360 (13 May 2002)
- Last updated on: 30 January 2021.

Todor Enev (Bulgarian: Тодор Енев, born 8 February 1982) is a former professional Bulgarian tennis player. On 16 August 2004, he reached his highest ATP singles ranking of 252 whilst his best doubles ranking was 360 on 13 May 2002.

== Challenger and Futures Finals ==
=== Singles: 16 (9–7) ===
Legend (singles) ATP Challenger Tour (0–0) ITF Futures (9–7)	Titles by surface Hard (3–6) Clay (5–1) Grass (1–0) Carpet (0–0)

Result	W–L	Date	Tournament	Tier	Surface	Opponent	Score
Win	1–0	Jun 2001	Macedonia F2, Skopje	Futures	Clay	(Russia) Mikhail Elgin	7–6^{(9–7)}, 6–4
Loss	1–1	Jul 2001	Macedonia F3, Skopje	Futures	Hard	(Bulgaria) Milen Velev	5–7, 4–6
Loss	1–2	Nov 2002	Thailand F2, Nonthaburi	Futures	Hard	(Russia) Mikhail Elgin	4–6, 3–6
Win	2–2	Jan 2003	India F1, Lucknow	Futures	Grass	(Japan) Satoshi Iwabuchi	6–2, 6–2
Loss	2–3	Jul 2003	Serbia F4, Belgrade	Futures	Clay	(France) Stéphane Robert	2–6, 1–4 ret.
Win	3–3	Sep 2003	Spain F24, Madrid	Futures	Hard	(Spain) Javier Genaro-Martinez	6–1, 6–1
Win	4–3	Oct 2003	Spain F26, El Ejido	Futures	Hard	(Spain) Daniel Monedero	6–1, 7–6^{(7–1)}
Loss	4–4	Feb 2004	India F1A, New Delhi	Futures	Hard	(Pakistan) Aisam-ul-Haq Qureshi	3–6, 4–6
Win	5–4	Apr 2005	Greece F1, Kalamata	Futures	Hard	(Greece) Konstantinos Economidis	6–3, 6–2
Loss	5–5	Apr 2005	Greece F2, Syros	Futures	Hard	(Greece) Konstantinos Economidis	3–6, 1–6
Win	6–5	Aug 2006	Bulgaria F1, Plovdiv	Futures	Clay	(Bulgaria) Ivaylo Traykov	6–2, 7–5
Win	7–5	Jan 2007	India F1, Kolkata	Futures	Clay	(Romania) Artemon Apostu-Efremov	6–3, 7–5
Loss	7–6	Feb 2007	India F2, New Delhi	Futures	Hard	(Russia) Alexander Kudryavtsev	4–6, 2–6
Win	8–6	Aug 2007	Bulgaria F5, Varna	Futures	Clay	(Germany) Marc-Andre Stratling	6–2, 7–5
Win	9–6	Sep 2007	Bulgaria F6, Bourgas	Futures	Clay	(Germany) Peter Torebko	6–4, 6–0
Loss	9–7	Dec 2007	Israel F5, Ramat HaSharon	Futures	Hard	(Israel) Harel Levy	4–6, 0–6

=== Doubles: 20 (7–13) ===
Legend (doubles) ATP Challenger Tour (0–1) ITF Futures (7–12)	Titles by surface Hard (3–1) Clay (4–10) Grass (0–0) Carpet (0–2)

Result	W–L	Date	Tournament	Tier	Surface	Partner	Opponents	Score
Loss	0–1	Jun 2001	Macedonia F2, Skopje	Futures	Clay	(Bulgaria) Milen Velev	(Russia) Mikhail Elgin (Russia) Evgueni Smirnov	6–4, 4–6, 1–6
Win	1–1	Jul 2001	Macedonia F3, Skopje	Futures	Hard	(Bulgaria) Milen Velev	(Bulgaria) Radoslav Lukaev (North Macedonia) Predrag Rusevski	6–2, 7–5
Loss	1–2	Mar 2002	France F8, Melun	Futures	Carpet (i)	(Russia) Dmitry Vlasov	(Poland) Mariusz Fyrstenberg (Bulgaria) Radoslav Lukaev	2–6, 2–6
Win	2–2	Jul 2003	Serbia and Montenegro F4, Belgrade	Futures	Clay	(Bulgaria) Radoslav Lukaev	(France) Stéphane Robert (France) Xavier Audouy	6–4, 6–7^{(7–9)}, 6–4
Loss	2–3	Sep 2003	Sofia, Bulgaria	Challenger	Clay	(Bulgaria) Dimo Tolev	(Bulgaria) Ilia Kushev (Austria) Luben Pampoulov	3–6, 1–6
Win	3–3	Oct 2003	Spain F25, Martos	Futures	Hard	(Romania) Adrian Cruciat	(Italy) Massimo Ocera (Italy) Marco Pedrini	6–4, 6–4
Loss	3–4	Mar 2004	India F2, Kolkata	Futures	Clay	(Bulgaria) Yordan Kanev	(India) Mustafa Ghouse (India) Vishal Uppal	4–6, 3–6
Loss	3–5	Oct 2004	Spain F25, Martos	Futures	Hard	(Romania) Adrian Cruciat	(Spain) Miquel Perez Puigdomenech (Spain) Gabriel Trujillo-Soler	3–6, 6–7^{(4–7)}
Loss	3–6	Jan 2006	Austria F2, Bergheim	Futures	Carpet (i)	(Bulgaria) Ilia Kushev	(Austria) Werner Eschauer (Romania) Florin Mergea	2–6, 3–6
Loss	3–7	Sep 2006	Bulgaria F3, Sofia	Futures	Clay	(Bulgaria) Tihomir Grozdanov	(Bulgaria) Ilia Kushev (Bulgaria) Yordan Kanev	6–7^{(4–7)}, 4–6
Win	4–7	Dec 2006	India F4, New Delhi	Futures	Hard	(Japan) Hiroki Kondo	(Kazakhstan) Alexey Kedryuk (India) Sunil-Kumar Sipaeya	6–3, 6–1
Loss	4–8	Jul 2007	Serbia F2, Belgrade	Futures	Clay	(Bulgaria) Simeon Ivanov	(Serbia) Vladimir Obradović (Montenegro) Goran Tošić	5–7, 1–6
Win	5–8	May 2008	Italy F14, Parma	Futures	Clay	(Finland) Juho Paukku	(Germany) Bastian Knittel (Russia) Denis Matsukevich	6–2, 6–4
Loss	5–9	Jun 2008	Bulgaria F4, Sofia	Futures	Clay	(Bulgaria) Ilia Kushev	(Bulgaria) Tihomir Grozdanov (Bulgaria) Simeon Ivanov	3–6, 6–4, [4–10]
Win	6–9	Jun 2008	Romania F8, Bucharest	Futures	Clay	(Bulgaria) Tihomir Grozdanov	(Romania) Alexandru-Daniel Carpen (Romania) Costin Paval	6–1, 6–2
Loss	6–10	Aug 2008	Bulgaria F5, Dobrich	Futures	Clay	(Bulgaria) Valentin Dimov	(Bulgaria) Tihomir Grozdanov (Bulgaria) Simeon Ivanov	6–2, 5–7, [6–10]
Loss	6–11	Aug 2008	Bulgaria F6, Bourgas	Futures	Clay	(Bulgaria) Valentin Dimov	(Ukraine) Gleb Alekseenko (Ukraine) Vadim Alekseenko	1–6, 5–7
Loss	6–12	Sep 2008	Bulgaria F7, Sliven	Futures	Clay	(Bulgaria) Valentin Dimov	(Ukraine) Gleb Alekseenko (Ukraine) Vadim Alekseenko	5–7, 5–7
Win	7–12	Jan 2009	U.S.A. F2, Hollywood	Futures	Clay	(Bulgaria) Grigor Dimitrov	(Italy) Stefano Ianni (Italy) Mattia Livraghi	6–1, 6–2
Loss	7–13	May 2009	Bulgaria F1, Sandanski	Futures	Clay	(Bulgaria) Valentin Dimov	(Denmark) Thomas Kromann (Australia) John Millman	6–3, 1–6, [5–10]

== Year-end rankings ==
Year	1997	1998	1999	2000	2001	2002	2003	2004	2005	2006	2007	2008	2009	2010	2011	2012
Singles	1209	-	1075	740	349	492	294	362	384	676	345	743	808	782	1409	1223
Doubles	-	-	-	-	364	558	398	597	792	570	777	481	856	1430	-	-

== Davis Cup ==
Todor Enev debuted for the Bulgaria Davis Cup team in 1999. Since then he has 24 nominations with 33 ties played, his singles W/L record is 17–14 and doubles W/L record is 11–6 (28–20 overall).

=== Singles (17–14) ===
Edition	Round	Date	Surface	Opponent	W/L	Result
1999 Europe/Africa Zone Group II	1R	2 May 1999	Clay	(Togo) Kossi Loglo	W	6–0, 6–1
2000 Europe/Africa Zone Group II	RPO	23 July 2000	Clay	(Israel) Lior Mor	L	3–6, 3–6, 5–7
2001 Europe/Africa Zone Group III	RR	24 May 2001	Clay	(Togo) Kwami Gakpo	W	4–0, 4–1, 4–0
2001 Europe/Africa Zone Group III	RR	25 May 2001	Clay	(North Macedonia) Goran Sterijovski	W	4–2, 4–2, 4–2
2001 Europe/Africa Zone Group III	SF	26 May 2001	Clay	(Bosnia and Herzegovina) Igor Racic	W	4–2, 4–2, 5–3
2002 Europe/Africa Zone Group II	R1	3 May 2002	Clay	(Ukraine) Andrei Dernovskiy	W	6–4, 6–1, 6–3
2002 Europe/Africa Zone Group II	R1	5 May 2002	Clay	(Ukraine) Orest Tereshchuk	L	3–6, 6–7^{(1–7)}, 6–3, 4–6
2002 Europe/Africa Zone Group II	QF	12 July 2002	Hard	(Ivory Coast) Claude N'Goran	W	3–6, 7–5, 6–7^{(2–7)}, 7–5, 6–3
2002 Europe/Africa Zone Group II	QF	14 July 2002	Hard	(Ivory Coast) Valentin Sanon	W	6–7^{(3–7)}, 3–6, 6–1, 7–6^{(7–5)}, 6–1
2003 Europe/Africa Zone Group II	QF	14 July 2003	Clay	(Serbia and Montenegro) Boris Pašanski	L	2–6, 4–6
2004 Europe/Africa Zone Group II	R1	9 April 2004	Carpet (I)	(Egypt) Mohamed Mamoun	W	6–2, 6–0, 6–2
2004 Europe/Africa Zone Group II	QF	16 July 2004	Clay	(Italy) Potito Starace	L	1–6, 2–6, 3–6
2005 Europe/Africa Zone Group II	R1	4 March 2005	Carpet (I)	(Georgia (country)) Irakli Ushangishvili	W	6–2, 6–3, 6–2
2005 Europe/Africa Zone Group II	R1	6 March 2005	Carpet (I)	(Georgia (country)) Lado Chikhladze	W	6–1, 6–2, 5–7, 6–4
2005 Europe/Africa Zone Group II	QF	15 July 2005	Clay	(Finland) Tuomas Ketola	W	3–6, 6–4, 6–1, 3–6, 8–6
2005 Europe/Africa Zone Group II	SF	23 September 2005	Hard	(Ukraine) Orest Tereshchuk	L	2–6, 4–6, 3–6
2005 Europe/Africa Zone Group II	SF	25 September 2005	Hard	(Ukraine) Mikhail Filima	L	4–6, 4–6, 3–6
2006 Europe/Africa Zone Group II	R1	9 April 2006	Clay	(Cyprus) Photos Kallias	W	7–6^{(7–2)}, 6–1, 1–6, 6–4
2006 Europe/Africa Zone Group II	QF	23 July 2006	Clay	(Hungary) Dénes Lukács	W	6–3, 7–5
2007 Europe/Africa Zone Group II	R1	6 April 2007	Carpet (I)	(Latvia) Andis Juška	L	7–6^{(7–5)}, 3–6, 3–6, 6–7^{(3–7)}
2007 Europe/Africa Zone Group II	RPO	22 July 2007	Clay	(Cyprus) Marcos Baghdatis	L	1–6, 3–6
2008 Europe/Africa Zone Group III	RR	8 April 2008	Clay	(Montenegro) Goran Tošić	W	6–4, 6–0
2008 Europe/Africa Zone Group III	RR	9 April 2008	Clay	(Ivory Coast) Lavry Sylvain N'yaba	W	6–1, 6–2
2008 Europe/Africa Zone Group III	RR	10 April 2008	Clay	(Madagascar) Tony Rajaobelina	L	3–6, 2–6
2008 Europe/Africa Zone Group III	RR	11 April 2008	Clay	(Turkey) Marsel İlhan	W	6–2, 6–3
2009 Europe/Africa Zone Group II	R1	6 March 2009	Carpet (I)	(Hungary) Attila Balázs	W	6–2, 4–6, 6–4, 6–4
2009 Europe/Africa Zone Group II	QF	10 July 2009	Clay	(Latvia) Ernests Gulbis	L	5–7, 2–6, 2–6
2010 Europe/Africa Zone Group II	R1	5 March 2010	Hard (I)	(Monaco) Benjamin Balleret	L	6–4, 7–6^{(7–1)}, 5–7, 2–6, 1–6
2010 Europe/Africa Zone Group II	QF	9 July 2010	Clay	(Slovenia) Grega Žemlja	L	3–6, 1–6, 6–2, 4–6
2010 Europe/Africa Zone Group II	QF	11 July 2010	Clay	(Slovenia) Blaž Kavčič	L	2–6, 1–6
2011 Europe/Africa Zone Group II	R1	4 March 2011	Hard (I)	(Belarus) Uladzimir Ignatik	L	2–6, 6–3, 7–6^{(7–4)}, 2–6, 2–6

=== Doubles (11–6) ===
Edition	Round	Date	Partner	Surface	Opponents	W/L	Result
2000 Europe/Africa Zone Group II	RPO	22 July 2000	(Bulgaria) Radoslav Lukaev	Clay	(Israel) Jonathan Erlich (Israel) Harel Levy	W	6–4, 7–5, 7–6^{(7–5)}
2001 Europe/Africa Zone Group III	RR	23 May 2001	(Bulgaria) Ivo Bratanov	Clay	(Namibia) Nicky Buys (Namibia) Jean-Pierre Huish	W	4–0, 4–2, 0–4, 4–0
2001 Europe/Africa Zone Group III	SF	26 May 2001	(Bulgaria) Ivo Bratanov	Clay	(Bosnia and Herzegovina) Aleksandar Antonijevic (Bosnia and Herzegovina) Vladimir Arapovic	W	4–0, 4–1, 4–1
2001 Europe/Africa Zone Group III	F	27 May 2001	(Bulgaria) Milen Velev	Clay	(Egypt) Mohamed Mamoun (Egypt) Marwan Zewar	W	4–2, 4–2, 4–1
2002 Europe/Africa Zone Group II	R1	4 May 2002	(Bulgaria) Milen Velev	Clay	(Ukraine) Andrei Dernovskiy (Ukraine) Orest Tereshchuk	W	7–6^{(7–5)}, 6–7^{(5–7)}, 7–6^{(7–4)}, 6–3
2002 Europe/Africa Zone Group II	QF	13 July 2002	(Bulgaria) Milen Velev	Hard	(Ivory Coast) Claude N'Goran (Ivory Coast) Valentin Sanon	L	4–6, 7–5, 2–6, 6–1, 4–6
2003 Europe/Africa Zone Group II	R1	5 April 2003	(Bulgaria) Radoslav Lukaev	Carpet (I)	(Ukraine) Andrei Dernovskiy (Ukraine) Orest Tereshchuk	W	6–3, 6–4, 6–4
2003 Europe/Africa Zone Group II	QF	13 July 2003	(Bulgaria) Radoslav Lukaev	Clay	(Serbia and Montenegro) Dejan Petrovic (Serbia and Montenegro) Nenad Zimonjić	L	3–6, 1–6, 2–6
2004 Europe/Africa Zone Group II	R1	10 April 2004	(Bulgaria) Ivaylo Traykov	Carpet (I)	(Egypt) Amr Ghoneim (Egypt) Karim Maamoun	W	6–3, 7–5, 6–2
2007 Europe/Africa Zone Group II	RPO	21 July 2007	(Bulgaria) Ilia Kushev	Clay	(Cyprus) Marcos Baghdatis (Cyprus) Photos Kallias	L	2–6, 3–6, 3–6
2008 Europe/Africa Zone Group III	RR	10 April 2008	(Bulgaria) Grigor Dimitrov	Clay	(Madagascar) Tony Rajaobelina (Madagascar) Germain Rasolondrazana	W	6–1, 6–3
2009 Europe/Africa Zone Group II	R1	7 March 2009	(Bulgaria) Grigor Dimitrov	Carpet (I)	(Hungary) Kornél Bardóczky (Hungary) Robert Varga	L	6–1, 2–6, 6–3, 2–6, 2–6
2009 Europe/Africa Zone Group II	QF	11 July 2009	(Bulgaria) Ivaylo Traykov	Clay	(Latvia) Ernests Gulbis (Latvia) Deniss Pavlovs	L	4–6, 4–6, 4–6
2011 Europe/Africa Zone Group II	RPO	9 July 2011	(Bulgaria) Dimitar Kutrovsky	Carpet (I)	(Cyprus) Marcos Baghdatis (Cyprus) Rareş Cuzdriorean	L	2–6, 2–6, 6–3, 6–4, 4–6
2012 Europe Zone Group III	RR	2 May 2012	(Bulgaria) Petar Trendafilov	Clay	(Albania) Flavio Deçe (Albania) Rei Pelushi	W	6–0, 6–2
2012 Europe Zone Group III	RR	4 May 2012	(Bulgaria) Petar Trendafilov	Clay	(Georgia (country)) Aleksandre Metreveli (Georgia (country)) George Tsivadze	W	6–1, 7–6^{(7–4)}
2012 Europe Zone Group III	PPO	5 May 2012	(Bulgaria) Petar Trendafilov	Clay	(North Macedonia) Tomislav Jotovski (North Macedonia) Danil Zelenkov	W	6–3, 6–3

- RPO = Relegation Play–off
- PPO = Promotion Play–off
- RR = Round Robin
