= 2002 US Open – Men's singles qualifying =

Men's singles qualifying
- 2002 US Open

Events
Singles	men	women		boys	girls
Doubles	men	women	mixed	boys	girls
WC Singles	men	women	quad
WC Doubles	men	women	quad
Legends	men	women	mixed

Qualification
Singles	men	women
- US Open

This article displays the qualifying draw for the Men's Singles at the 2002 US Open.

== Seeds ==
1. (Germany) Lars Burgsmüller (qualifying competition, lucky loser)
2. (Netherlands) Martin Verkerk (qualified)
3. (Croatia) Željko Krajan (second round)
4. (Belgium) Christophe Rochus (first round)
5. (Argentina) Franco Squillari (second round)
6. (Italy) Stefano Galvani (second round)
7. (Switzerland) George Bastl (second round)
8. (Israel) Noam Okun (qualified)
9. (Argentina) Edgardo Massa (first round)
10. (Croatia) Mario Ančić (qualifying competition, lucky loser)
11. (France) Arnaud Di Pasquale (second round)
12. (Japan) Takao Suzuki (second round)
13. (France) Cédric Pioline (first round)
14. (Czech Republic) Ota Fukárek (first round)
15. (Brazil) Alexandre Simoni (qualifying competition)
16. (Germany) Michael Kohlmann (first round)
17. (Belgium) Dick Norman (qualified)
18. (United States) Cecil Mamiit (first round)
19. (France) Jean-René Lisnard (qualified)
20. (Switzerland) Ivo Heuberger (qualified)
21. (Brazil) Ricardo Mello (second round)
22. (Russia) Andrei Stoliarov (first round)
23. (Uzbekistan) Oleg Ogorodov (second round)
24. (Germany) Alexander Waske (qualified)
25. (Netherlands) John van Lottum (qualified)
26. (Slovakia) Karol Beck (qualifying competition)
27. (Belarus) Vladimir Voltchkov (qualifying competition)
28. (Germany) Tomas Behrend (first round)
29. (France) Grégory Carraz (second round)
30. (Germany) Oliver Gross (second round)
31. (Australia) Scott Draper (first round)
32. (Germany) Björn Phau (second round)

== Qualifiers ==
1. (Belgium) Dick Norman
2. (Netherlands) Martin Verkerk
3. (Switzerland) Ivo Heuberger
4. (Russia) Igor Kunitsyn
5. (Sweden) Björn Rehnquist
6. (Germany) Alexander Waske
7. (Algeria) Slimane Saoudi
8. (Israel) Noam Okun
9. (Bulgaria) Radoslav Lukaev
10. (Finland) Tuomas Ketola
11. (Netherlands) John van Lottum
12. (Sweden) Robin Söderling
13. (Argentina) Gastón Etlis
14. (Netherlands) Edwin Kempes
15. (France) Jean-René Lisnard
16. (United States) Eric Taino

== Lucky losers ==
1. (Germany) Lars Burgsmüller
2. (Croatia) Mario Ančić

== Qualifying draw ==
Key

- Q = Qualifier
- WC = Wild card
- LL = Lucky loser
- Alt = Alternate
- ITF = ITF entry
- PR = Protected ranking
- SR = Special ranking
- SE = Special exempt
- JE = Junior exempt
- JR = Junior Accelerator Programme entrant
- CO = College Accelerator Programme entrant
- NG = Next Gen Accelerator Program entrant
- w/o = Walkover
- r = Retired
- d = Defaulted

=== First qualifier ===
First round
1	(Germany) Lars Burgsmüller	6	7
(United States) Michael Joyce	4	5
(Italy) Giorgio Galimberti	6^{2}	2
(Chinese Taipei) Jimmy Wang	7^{7}	6
(Italy) Cristiano Caratti	1	2
(France) Richard Gasquet	6	6
(Japan) Gouichi Motomura	2	6	4
17	(Belgium) Dick Norman	6	0	6

Second round
1	(Germany) Lars Burgsmüller	6	6
(Chinese Taipei) Jimmy Wang	1	3
(France) Richard Gasquet	6	3	4
17	(Belgium) Dick Norman	3	6	6

Qualifying competition
1	(Germany) Lars Burgsmüller	6^{5}	3
17	(Belgium) Dick Norman	7^{7}	6

=== Second qualifier ===
First round
2	(Netherlands) Martin Verkerk	5	6	7^{7}
(Sweden) Johan Settergren	7	3	6^{2}
(Switzerland) Yves Allegro	6	4	6
(Russia) Denis Golovanov	4	6	3
WC	(United States) Phillip King	4	6	3
(United States) Michael Russell	6	3	6
(Italy) Gianluca Pozzi	4	6	2
26	(Slovakia) Karol Beck	6	3	6

Second round
2	(Netherlands) Martin Verkerk	6	6
(Switzerland) Yves Allegro	3	2
(United States) Michael Russell	3	4
26	(Slovakia) Karol Beck	6	6

Qualifying competition
2	(Netherlands) Martin Verkerk	2	6	6
26	(Slovakia) Karol Beck	6	2	3

=== Third qualifier ===
First round
3	(Croatia) Željko Krajan	6	3	6
(Peru) Iván Miranda	4	6	1
(United States) Robert Kendrick	7^{7}	6
(Argentina) Juan Pablo Guzmán	6^{5}	3
(Italy) Filippo Volandri	3	3
(United Kingdom) Arvind Parmar	6	6
(Czech Republic) Petr Dezort	3	1
20	(Switzerland) Ivo Heuberger	6	6

Second round
3	(Croatia) Željko Krajan	3	2
(United States) Robert Kendrick	6	6
(United Kingdom) Arvind Parmar	3	6	3
20	(Switzerland) Ivo Heuberger	6	3	6

Qualifying competition
(United States) Robert Kendrick	6^{9}	3
20	(Switzerland) Ivo Heuberger	7^{11}	6

=== Fourth qualifier ===
First round
4	(Belgium) Christophe Rochus	5	4
(Russia) Igor Kunitsyn	7	6
(Socialist Federal Republic of Yugoslavia) Nenad Zimonjić	7	4	7^{7}
WC	(United States) Douglas Stewart	5	6	6^{3}
(Brazil) Marcos Daniel	7^{7}	7^{7}
(Brazil) Daniel Melo	6^{2}	6^{4}
(Mexico) Miguel Gallardo Valles	1	7^{7}	6
18	(United States) Cecil Mamiit	6	6^{5}	2

Second round
(Russia) Igor Kunitsyn	6	4	6
(Socialist Federal Republic of Yugoslavia) Nenad Zimonjić	1	6	4
(Brazil) Marcos Daniel	6^{5}	6	7^{8}
(Mexico) Miguel Gallardo Valles	7^{7}	4	6^{6}

Qualifying competition
(Russia) Igor Kunitsyn	6	6
(Brazil) Marcos Daniel	2	0

=== Fifth qualifier ===
First round
5	(Argentina) Franco Squillari	6	1	6
(Norway) Jan Frode Andersen	3	6	3
(Argentina) Cristian Kordasz	4	7^{7}	1^{r}
(Germany) David Prinosil	6	6^{5}	1
(Sweden) Björn Rehnquist	2	7^{7}	6
(Spain) Quino Muñoz	6	6^{5}	2
WC	(United States) Brian Baker	2	3
21	(Brazil) Ricardo Mello	6	6

Second round
5	(Argentina) Franco Squillari	7	5	4
(Germany) David Prinosil	5	7	6
(Sweden) Björn Rehnquist	6	3	6
21	(Brazil) Ricardo Mello	4	6	4

Qualifying competition
(Germany) David Prinosil	6	6	1
(Sweden) Björn Rehnquist	7	3	6

=== Sixth qualifier ===
First round
6	(Italy) Stefano Galvani	6	6
PR	(Romania) Răzvan Sabău	4	0
(Sweden) Magnus Larsson	7	6
(Netherlands) Peter Wessels	5	4
(Chinese Taipei) Lu Yen-hsun	3	6	4
(Greece) Konstantinos Economidis	6	0	6
WC	(United States) Travis Rettenmaier	2	4
24	(Germany) Alexander Waske	6	6

Second round
6	(Italy) Stefano Galvani	2	3
(Sweden) Magnus Larsson	6	6
(Greece) Konstantinos Economidis	5	6^{5}
24	(Germany) Alexander Waske	7	7^{7}

Qualifying competition
(Sweden) Magnus Larsson	4	4
24	(Germany) Alexander Waske	6	6

=== Seventh qualifier ===
First round
7	(Switzerland) George Bastl	7^{8}	7^{10}
(South Africa) Justin Bower	6^{6}	6^{8}
(France) Nicolas Thomann	6	6
PR	(Italy) Laurence Tieleman	1	2
(Germany) Markus Hantschk	6^{5}	3
WC	(United States) Eric Nunez	7^{7}	6
(Algeria) Slimane Saoudi	3	6	6
28	(Germany) Tomas Behrend	6	2	4

Second round
7	(Switzerland) George Bastl	4	4
(France) Nicolas Thomann	6	6
WC	(United States) Eric Nunez	7^{9}	2	4
(Algeria) Slimane Saoudi	6^{7}	6	6

Qualifying competition
(France) Nicolas Thomann	5	6^{4}
(Algeria) Slimane Saoudi	7	7^{7}

=== Eighth qualifier ===
First round
8	(Israel) Noam Okun	6	6
(France) Nicolas Mahut	0	4
(France) Cyril Saulnier	0	3
(Israel) Noam Behr	6	6
(France) Jean-François Bachelot	6	6
(France) Florent Serra	2	3
(France) Julien Benneteau	5	6^{1}
23	(Uzbekistan) Oleg Ogorodov	7	7^{7}

Second round
8	(Israel) Noam Okun	6	7^{7}
(Israel) Noam Behr	4	6^{3}
(France) Jean-François Bachelot	3	6	6
23	(Uzbekistan) Oleg Ogorodov	6	1	2

Qualifying competition
8	(Israel) Noam Okun	4	7^{7}	6
(France) Jean-François Bachelot	6	6^{5}	4

=== Ninth qualifier ===
First round
9	(Argentina) Edgardo Massa	2	4
(Czech Republic) Jaroslav Levinský	6	6
(France) Éric Prodon	4	3
(Bulgaria) Radoslav Lukaev	6	6
(Croatia) Ivo Karlović	6^{5}	5
(Austria) Alexander Peya	7^{7}	7
(Australia) Peter Luczak	6	6
22	(Russia) Andrei Stoliarov	1	2

Second round
(Czech Republic) Jaroslav Levinský	6^{4}	4
(Bulgaria) Radoslav Lukaev	7^{7}	6
(Austria) Alexander Peya	2	3
(Australia) Peter Luczak	6	6

Qualifying competition
(Bulgaria) Radoslav Lukaev	6	6
(Australia) Peter Luczak	4	4

=== Tenth qualifier ===
First round
10	(Croatia) Mario Ančić	7^{7}	3	6
(United Kingdom) Jamie Delgado	6^{1}	6	2
(Netherlands) Jan Siemerink	3	1
(United Kingdom) Martin Lee	6	6
(Finland) Tuomas Ketola	6	7
(United States) Bob Bryan	4	5
(Zimbabwe) Wayne Black	3	5
29	(France) Grégory Carraz	6	7

Second round
10	(Croatia) Mario Ančić	6	6
(United Kingdom) Martin Lee	2	1
(Finland) Tuomas Ketola	3	7^{7}	7^{7}
29	(France) Grégory Carraz	6	6^{2}	6^{5}

Qualifying competition
10	(Croatia) Mario Ančić	1	1
(Finland) Tuomas Ketola	6	6

=== Eleventh qualifier ===
First round
11	(France) Arnaud Di Pasquale	6	6
(Russia) Artem Derepasko	3	0
(Pakistan) Aisam-ul-Haq Qureshi	6	4	4
(Croatia) Lovro Zovko	4	6	6
(Australia) Jaymon Crabb	6^{4}	3
(Argentina) Mariano Delfino	7^{7}	6
WC	(United States) KC Corkery	6^{0}	4
25	(Netherlands) John van Lottum	7^{7}	6

Second round
11	(France) Arnaud Di Pasquale	4	4
(Croatia) Lovro Zovko	6	6
(Argentina) Mariano Delfino	4	1
25	(Netherlands) John van Lottum	6	6

Qualifying competition
(Croatia) Lovro Zovko	6^{7}	2
25	(Netherlands) John van Lottum	7^{9}	6

=== Twelfth qualifier ===
First round
12	(Japan) Takao Suzuki	6	6
(Republic of Ireland) Peter Clarke	2	3
(Sweden) Robin Söderling	4	7	7
(Belgium) Gilles Elseneer	6	5	5
(France) Sébastien De Chaunac	1	6	7^{7}
(Germany) Christian Vinck	6	2	6^{3}
(United States) Levar Harper-Griffith	1	1
27	(Belarus) Vladimir Voltchkov	6	6

Second round
12	(Japan) Takao Suzuki	3	2
(Sweden) Robin Söderling	6	6
(France) Sébastien De Chaunac	3	3
27	(Belarus) Vladimir Voltchkov	6	6

Qualifying competition
(Sweden) Robin Söderling	7^{7}	1	6
27	(Belarus) Vladimir Voltchkov	6^{5}	6	2

=== Thirteenth qualifier ===
First round
13	(France) Cédric Pioline	6	2	0^{r}
(Switzerland) Marco Chiudinelli	3	6	5
(Argentina) Gastón Etlis	1	7^{7}	6
(Argentina) Sebastián Prieto	6	6^{4}	4
PR	(Canada) Sébastien Lareau	0	3
(South Africa) Louis Vosloo	6	6
(France) Julien Varlet	7	6
31	(Australia) Scott Draper	5	4

Second round
(Switzerland) Marco Chiudinelli	0	3
(Argentina) Gastón Etlis	6	6
(South Africa) Louis Vosloo	3	4
(France) Julien Varlet	6	6

Qualifying competition
(Argentina) Gastón Etlis	6	6
(France) Julien Varlet	3	4

=== Fourteenth qualifier ===
First round
14	(Czech Republic) Ota Fukárek	3	2
(Israel) Amir Hadad	6	6
(Italy) Federico Luzzi	2	4
(Czech Republic) Tomáš Zíb	6	6
(Netherlands) Edwin Kempes	6	6
WC	(United States) Jesse Witten	4	1
(Romania) Gabriel Trifu	7	5	2
30	(Germany) Oliver Gross	5	7	6

Second round
(Israel) Amir Hadad	6	7
(Czech Republic) Tomáš Zíb	4	5
(Netherlands) Edwin Kempes	6	7
30	(Germany) Oliver Gross	3	5

Qualifying competition
(Israel) Amir Hadad	3	6	6^{9}
(Netherlands) Edwin Kempes	6	4	7^{11}

=== Fifteenth qualifier ===
First round
15	(Brazil) Alexandre Simoni	7^{7}	6
(France) Olivier Patience	6^{2}	2
(South Africa) Neville Godwin	3	7^{7}	3
(France) Thomas Dupré	6	6^{1}	6
(Canada) Frédéric Niemeyer	6	1	2
(Czech Republic) Jan Hernych	3	6	6
(Italy) Stefano Pescosolido	4	4
19	(France) Jean-René Lisnard	6	6

Second round
15	(Brazil) Alexandre Simoni	6	1	7
(France) Thomas Dupré	3	6	5
(Czech Republic) Jan Hernych	4	6	2
19	(France) Jean-René Lisnard	6	3	6

Qualifying competition
15	(Brazil) Alexandre Simoni	6	2	6^{4}
19	(France) Jean-René Lisnard	3	6	7^{7}

=== Sixteenth qualifier ===
First round
16	(Germany) Michael Kohlmann	5	1
(United States) Paul Goldstein	7	6
WC	(United States) Brandon Wagner	4	2
(Thailand) Danai Udomchoke	6	6
(United States) Jeff Salzenstein	4	5
(United States) Eric Taino	6	7
WC	(United States) Bo Hodge	4	3
32	(Germany) Björn Phau	6	6

Second round
(United States) Paul Goldstein	4	1
(Thailand) Danai Udomchoke	6	6
(United States) Eric Taino	6	3	7
32	(Germany) Björn Phau	2	6	5

Qualifying competition
(Thailand) Danai Udomchoke	3	6	4
(United States) Eric Taino	6	2	6
