= Orlin Stanoytchev =

Bulgarian tennis player

Orlin Stanoytchev Орлин Станойчев
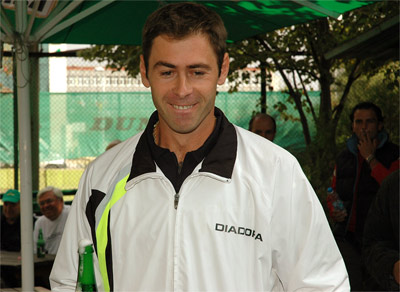
- Country (sports): Bulgaria
- Residence: Geneva, Switzerland
- Born: 24 September 1971 (age 53); Sofia, Bulgaria
- Height: 1.85 m (6 ft 1 in)
- Turned pro: 1993
- Retired: 2002
- Plays: Right-handed
- Prize money: US$ 484,515

Singles
- Career record: 16–50 (at ATP Tour level, Grand Slam level, and in Davis Cup)
- Career titles: 0; 4 Challengers, 1 Futures
- Highest ranking: No. 96 (24 April 2000)

Grand Slam singles results
- Australian Open: 1R (1997, 2000)
- French Open: 2R (2000)
- Wimbledon: 1R (1997, 1999)
- US Open: 1R (2000)

Doubles
- Career record: 4–7 (at ATP Tour level, Grand Slam level, and in Davis Cup)
- Career titles: 0; 5 Challengers, 0 Futures
- Highest ranking: No. 154 (10 June 2002)

Orlin Stanoytchev (Bulgarian: Орлин Станойчев) (born 24 September 1971) is a former professional tennis player from Bulgaria.

== Career ==
Stanoytchev, the Bulgarian junior champion in 1989, made the second round of a Grand Slam just once, but came close on other occasions. Twice at Wimbledon he lost five set matches in the opening round, one of which was against Todd Woodbridge in 1999, with the Australian winning 10–8 in the final set. When he finally broke through for his first win, at the 2000 French Open, it was from two sets down, beating Stéphane Huet. He experienced the reverse in the US Open later that year, losing to world number six Yevgeny Kafelnikov, despite winning the first two sets.

He reached two quarter-finals on the ATP Tour during his career, the first time in 1996 at Toulouse and the other in the 1999 Czech Open. The best win of his career came in the 1999 Majorca Open, when he defeated world number 22 Albert Costa.

The Bulgarian made regular Davis Cup appearances for his country throughout the 1990s, playing 11 ties in all. He won nine of his 16 singles matches and had a 1/2 record in doubles.

== Year-end rankings ==
Year	1991	1992	1993	1994	1995	1996	1997	1998	1999	2000	2001	2002	2003	2004	2005	2006
Singles	995	764	720	555	195	122	167	121	114	149	268	462	-	-	-	-
Doubles	-	960	557	519	377	279	503	279	725	196	225	234	1698	-	-	1257

== Challenger and Futures finals ==
=== Singles: 12 (5–7) ===
Legend (singles) ATP Challenger Tour (4–7) ITF Futures (1–0)	Titles by surface Hard (2–1) Clay (3–6) Grass (1–0) Carpet (0–0)

Result	W–L	Date	Tournament	Tier	Surface	Opponent	Score
Loss	0–1	Sep 1996	Alpirsbach, Germany	Challenger	Clay	(Sweden) Magnus Norman	4–6, 2–6
Win	1–1	Sep 1996	Budva, Yugoslavia	Challenger	Clay	(Italy) Davide Scala	7–6, 6–1
Loss	1–2	Oct 1997	Mallorca, Spain	Challenger	Clay	(Spain) Álex López Morón	4–6, 4–6
Win	2–2	Nov 1997	Portorož, Slovenia	Challenger	Hard (i)	(Germany) Lars Burgsmüller	1–6, 7–6, 6–0
Win	3–2	Jun 1998	Split, Croatia	Challenger	Clay	(Hungary) Attila Sávolt	7–6, 6–4
Loss	3–3	Sep 1998	Alpirsbach, Germany	Challenger	Clay	(Austria) Stefan Koubek	6–7, 4–6
Loss	3–4	Nov 1998	Aachen, Germany	Challenger	Hard (i)	(Germany) Hendrik Dreekmann	6–7, 4–6
Loss	3–5	May 1999	Sofia, Bulgaria	Challenger	Clay	(Germany) Marcello Craca	6–7, 0–6
Loss	3–6	Aug 1999	Geneva, Switzerland	Challenger	Clay	(Switzerland) Michel Kratochvil	0–6, 1–6
Loss	3–7	Sep 1999	Freudenstadt, Germany	Challenger	Clay	(Czech Republic) Michal Tabara	2–6, 6–7^{(5–7)}
Win	4–7	Mar 2001	Cherbourg, France	Challenger	Hard (i)	(Austria) Clemens Trimmel	6–4, 3–6, 7–5
Win	5–7	Jun 2002	France F11, Toulon	Futures	Clay	(Bulgaria) Radoslav Lukaev	6–2, 0–6, 7–5

=== Doubles: 9 (5–4) ===
Legend (doubles) ATP Challenger Tour (5–3) ITF Futures (0–1)	Titles by surface Hard (0–1) Clay (5–3) Grass (0–0) Carpet (0–0)

Result	W–L	Date	Tournament	Tier	Surface	Partner	Opponents	Score
Loss	0–1	Aug 1996	Istanbul, Turkey	Challenger	Hard	(Uzbekistan) Oleg Ogorodov	(United Kingdom) Mark Petchey (United Kingdom) Danny Sapsford	3–6, 5–7
Win	1–1	Sep 1998	Szczecin, Poland	Challenger	Clay	(Czech Republic) Radomír Vašek	(Italy) Massimo Ardinghi (Spain) Álex López Morón	7–6, 3–6, 6–4
Win	2–1	Jul 2000	Ulm, Germany	Challenger	Clay	(Russia) Mikhail Youzhny	(Germany) Tomas Behrend (Germany) Karsten Braasch	6–7^{(2–7)}, 7–5, 6–0
Win	3–1	Sep 2000	Sofia, Bulgaria	Challenger	Clay	(Australia) Dejan Petrovic	(Austria) Luben Pampoulov (Bulgaria) Radoslav Lukaev	6–2, 6–7^{(5–7)}, 7–6^{(8–6)}
Loss	3–2	Jul 2001	Montauban, France	Challenger	Clay	(Finland) Tuomas Ketola	(Argentina) Diego del Río (Uzbekistan) Vadim Kutsenko	4–6, 2–6
Win	4–2	Aug 2001	Geneva, Switzerland	Challenger	Clay	(Argentina) Diego del Río	(Spain) Feliciano López (Spain) Francisco Roig	2–6, 7–6^{(7–0)}, 7–6^{(7–3)}
Win	5–2	Mar 2002	San Luis Potosí, Mexico	Challenger	Clay	(Belgium) Dick Norman	(Argentina) Ignacio Hirigoyen (Argentina) Sebastián Prieto	w/o
Loss	5–3	Aug 2002	Geneva, Switzerland	Challenger	Clay	(Argentina) Andrés Schneiter	(Romania) Victor Hănescu (Argentina) Leonardo Olguín	6–1, 4–6, 4–6
Loss	5–4	Sep 2006	Switzerland F6, Geneva	Futures	Clay	(Switzerland) Constantin Sturdza	(Italy) Marco Gualdi (Czech Republic) Martin Vacek	4–6, 2–6

- w/o = Walkover

== Davis Cup ==
Orlin Stanoytchev debuted for the Bulgaria Davis Cup team in 1991. Since then he has 9 nominations with 11 ties played, his singles W/L record is 9–7 and doubles W/L record is 1–2 (10–9 overall).

=== Singles (9–7) ===
Edition	Round	Date	Surface	Opponent	W/L	Result
1991 Europe Zone Group II	QF	3 May 1991	Carpet (I)	(Norway) Anders Håseth	L	6–3, 1–6, 2–6, 4–6
1991 Europe Zone Group II	QF	5 May 1991	Carpet (I)	(Norway) Christian Ruud	L	2–6, 3–6
1992 Europe/Africa Zone Group II	QF	17 July 1992	Clay	(Greece) Anastasios Bavelas	L	2–6, 1–6, 2–6
1992 Europe/Africa Zone Group II	QF	19 July 1992	Clay	(Greece) George Kalovelonis	W	6–3, 6–3
1997 Europe/Africa Zone Group III	RR	21 May 1997	Clay	(Malta) Christopher Gatt	W	6–4, 6–0
1997 Europe/Africa Zone Group III	RR	22 May 1997	Clay	(Estonia) Rene Busch	W	6–0, 6–2
1997 Europe/Africa Zone Group III	RR	23 May 1997	Clay	(Kenya) Allan Cooper	W	6–2, 6–1
1997 Europe/Africa Zone Group III	SF	24 May 1997	Clay	(Moldova) Iurie Gorban	W	6–7^{(6–8)}, 6–4, 6–3
1997 Europe/Africa Zone Group III	F	25 May 1997	Clay	(Monaco) Sebastien Graeff	W	6–3, 4–6, 6–3
1998 Europe/Africa Zone Group II	R1	1 May 1998	Clay (I)	(Morocco) Mehdi Tahiri	W	6–2, 2–6, 6–3, 3–6, 6–2
1998 Europe/Africa Zone Group II	R1	3 May 1998	Clay (I)	(Morocco) Karim Alami	L	6–3, 3–6, 7–6^{(7–5)}, 3–6, 1–6
1998 Europe/Africa Zone Group II	RPO	17 July 1998	Clay	(Luxembourg) Mike Scheidweiler	W	6–2, 6–2, 6–1
1999 Europe/Africa Zone Group II	QF	16 July 1999	Clay	(Hungary) Gergely Kisgyörgy	L	6–4, 6–4, 3–6, 5–7, 3–6
1999 Europe/Africa Zone Group II	QF	18 July 1999	Clay	(Hungary) Attila Sávolt	L	4–6, 1–6, 4–6
2000 Europe/Africa Zone Group II	R1	28 April 2000	Clay	(Greece) Vasilis Mazarakis	W	6–2, 1–6, 6–3, 6–2
2000 Europe/Africa Zone Group II	R1	30 April 2000	Clay	(Greece) Solon Peppas	L	1–6, 6–3, 1–6, 2–6

=== Doubles (1–2) ===
Edition	Round	Date	Partner	Surface	Opponents	W/L	Result
1998 Europe/Africa Zone Group II	1R	2 May 1998	(Bulgaria) Milen Velev	Clay (I)	(Morocco) Karim Alami (Morocco) Mounir El Aarej	L	4–6, 5–7, 2–6
1998 Europe/Africa Zone Group II	RPO	18 July 1998	(Bulgaria) Milen Velev	Clay	(Luxembourg) Adrian Graimprey (Luxembourg) Pascal Schaul	W	6–3, 6–2, 6–4
2000 Europe/Africa Zone Group II	1R	29 April 2000	(Bulgaria) Ivaylo Traykov	Clay	(Greece) Konstantinos Economidis (Greece) Anastasios Vasiliadis	L	6–3, 6–7^{(1–7)}, 4–6, 6–7^{(5–7)}

- RR = Round Robin
- RPO = Relegation Play-off
