= Ilia Kushev =

Bulgarian tennis player

Ilia Kushev Илия Кушев
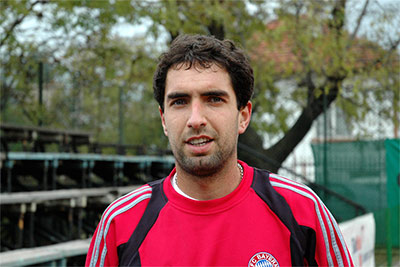
- Country (sports): Bulgaria
- Residence: Sofia, Bulgaria
- Born: 13 December 1980 (age 44); Plovdiv, Bulgaria
- Turned pro: 2000
- Retired: 2008
- Plays: Right-handed
- Prize money: US$ 31,495

Singles
- Career record: 3–5 (at ATP Tour level, Grand Slam level, and in Davis Cup)
- Career titles: 0; 0 Challengers, 1 Futures
- Highest ranking: No. 285 (16 August 2004)

Doubles
- Career record: 4–4 (at ATP Tour level, Grand Slam level, and in Davis Cup)
- Career titles: 0; 1 Challengers, 4 Futures
- Highest ranking: No. 234 (17 January 2011)
- Last updated on: 30 January 2021.

Ilia Kushev (sometimes also transliterated as Iliya Kushev) (Bulgarian: Илия Кушев, born 13 December 1980) is a former professional tennis player from Bulgaria. He has frequently played for Bulgaria at the Davis Cup. On 16 August 2004, he reached his highest ATP singles ranking of 285 whilst his best doubles ranking was 234 on 16 August 2004.

In 2006, Kushev married Vesela Tomova, a tennis coach.

== Year-end rankings ==
Year	2000	2001	2002	2003	2004	2005	2006	2007	2008
Singles	-	706	696	392	401	451	520	710	-
Doubles	1009	697	610	365	391	454	728	923	1351

== Challenger and Futures Finals ==
=== Singles: 9 (1–8) ===
Legend (singles) ATP Challenger Tour (0–0) ITF Futures (1–8)	Titles by surface Hard (0–1) Clay (1–7) Grass (0–0) Carpet (0–0)

Result	W–L	Date	Tournament	Tier	Surface	Opponent	Score
Win	1–0	Jun 2001	Macedonia F1, Skopje	Futures	Clay	(Romania) Artemon Apostu-Efremov	6–3, 7–6^{(9–7)}
Loss	1–1	Oct 2003	Greece F4, Thessaloniki	Futures	Clay	(Greece) Konstantinos Economidis	6–2, 4–6, 1–6
Loss	1–2	Jun 2004	Serbia and Montenegro F3, Belgrade	Futures	Clay	(Slovakia) František Polyak	4–6, 3–6
Loss	1–3	Dec 2004	Qatar F3, Doha	Futures	Hard	(Austria) Zbynek Mlynarik	6–4, 1–6, 3–6
Loss	1–4	Jun 2005	Serbia and Montenegro F1, Belgrade	Futures	Clay	(Serbia and Montenegro) Ilija Bozoljac	4–6, 6–4, 0–6
Loss	1–5	Jun 2006	Macedonia F2, Skopje	Futures	Clay	(Bulgaria) Ivaylo Traykov	6–7^{(4–7)}, 7–6^{(7–3)}, 5–7
Loss	1–6	Jul 2006	Serbia and Montenegro F2, Belgrade	Futures	Clay	(North Macedonia) Predrag Rusevski	4–6, 1–6
Loss	1–7	Aug 2006	Serbia and Montenegro F4, Novi Sad	Futures	Clay	(Serbia and Montenegro) Dejan Katić	0–6, 3–6
Loss	1–8	May 2007	Bulgaria F1, Sofia	Futures	Clay	(Belgium) Maxime Authom	4–6, 5–7

=== Doubles: 13 (5–8) ===
Legend (doubles) ATP Challenger Tour (1–2) ITF Futures (4–6)	Titles by surface Hard (0–2) Clay (5–5) Grass (0–0) Carpet (0–1)

Result	W–L	Date	Tournament	Tier	Surface	Partner	Opponents	Score
Loss	0–1	Sep 2002	Sofia, Bulgaria	Challenger	Clay	(Austria) Luben Pampoulov	(Germany) Christopher Kas (Austria) Oliver Marach	6–7^{(4–7)}, 7–6^{(9–7)}, 2–6
Win	1–1	Sep 2003	Sofia, Bulgaria	Challenger	Clay	(Austria) Luben Pampoulov	(Bulgaria) Todor Enev (Bulgaria) Dimo Tolev	6–3, 6–1
Loss	1–2	Oct 2003	Cyprus F1, Nicosia	Futures	Clay	(Bulgaria) Yordan Kanev	(Greece) Elefterios Alexiou (Greece) Alexandros Jakupovic	3–6, 3–6
Win	2–2	Jun 2004	Serbia and Montenegro F3, Belgrade	Futures	Clay	(Bulgaria) Yordan Kanev	(Serbia and Montenegro) Nikola Ćirić (Serbia and Montenegro) Goran Tošić	6–7^{(8–10)}, 7–6^{(7–4)}, 6–0
Loss	2–3	Dec 2004	Qatar F4, Doha	Futures	Hard	(Bulgaria) Yordan Kanev	(Russia) Artem Sitak (Russia) Dmitri Sitak	6–7^{(5–7)}, 0–6
Loss	2–4	Dec 2004	Qatar F5, Doha	Futures	Hard	(Bulgaria) Yordan Kanev	(Russia) Artem Sitak (Russia) Dmitri Sitak	w/o
Loss	2–5	Aug 2005	Timișoara, Romania	Challenger	Clay	(Bulgaria) Radoslav Lukaev	(Romania) Ionuț Moldovan (Romania) Gabriel Moraru	2–6, 0–6
Loss	2–6	Jan 2006	Austria F2, Bergheim	Futures	Carpet (i)	(Bulgaria) Todor Enev	(Austria) Werner Eschauer (Romania) Florin Mergea	2–6, 3–6
Win	3–6	Aug 2006	Bulgaria F1, Plovdiv	Futures	Clay	(Bulgaria) Yordan Kanev	(Sweden) Robert Gustafsson (United Kingdom) Jim May	7–6^{(7–3)}, 7–6^{(7–3)}
Win	4–6	Sep 2006	Bulgaria F3, Sofia	Futures	Clay	(Bulgaria) Yordan Kanev	(Bulgaria) Todor Enev (Bulgaria) Tihomir Grozdanov	7–6^{(7–4)}, 6–4
Loss	4–7	Jun 2007	Bulgaria F4, Sofia	Futures	Clay	(Bulgaria) Vasko Mladenov	(Serbia) David Savić (Serbia) Miljan Zekić	4–6, 3–6
Win	5–7	Jun 2007	Macedonia F1, Skopje	Futures	Clay	(Bulgaria) Yordan Kanev	(Sweden) Daniel Danilović (North Macedonia) Lazar Magdinčev	1–6, 7–6^{(8–6)}, 6–4
Loss	5–8	Jun 2008	Bulgaria F4, Sofia	Futures	Clay	(Bulgaria) Todor Enev	(Bulgaria) Tihomir Grozdanov (Bulgaria) Simeon Ivanov	3–6, 6–4, [4–10]

== Davis Cup ==
Ilia Kushev debuted for the Bulgaria Davis Cup team in 2003. Since then he has 13 nominations with 11 ties played, his singles W/L record is 3–5 and doubles W/L record is 4–4 (7–9 overall).

=== Singles (3–5) ===
Edition	Round	Date	Surface	Opponent	W/L	Result
2003 Europe/Africa Zone Group II	QF	11 July 2003	Clay	(Serbia and Montenegro) Janko Tipsarević	L	3–6, 6–1, 2–6, 3–6
2004 Europe/Africa Zone Group II	R1	11 April 2004	Carpet (I)	(Egypt) Amr Ghoneim	W	6–2, 6–2
2004 Europe/Africa Zone Group II	QF	18 July 2004	Clay	(Italy) Filippo Volandri	L	2–6, 0–6
2005 Europe/Africa Zone Group II	QF	17 July 2005	Clay	(Finland) Jarkko Nieminen	L	3–6, 5–7, 2–6
2006 Europe/Africa Zone Group II	R1	7 April 2006	Clay	(Cyprus) Photos Kallias	W	6–3, 6–2, 7–5
2006 Europe/Africa Zone Group II	R1	9 April 2006	Clay	(Cyprus) Marcos Baghdatis	L	3–6, 2–6, 2–6
2006 Europe/Africa Zone Group II	QF	21 July 2006	Clay	(Hungary) Kornél Bardóczky	L	5–7, 3–6, 0–6
2006 Europe/Africa Zone Group II	QF	23 July 2006	Clay	(Hungary) Sebő Kiss	W	7–5, 1–6, 6–2

=== Doubles (4–4) ===
Edition	Round	Date	Partner	Surface	Opponents	W/L	Result
2004 Europe/Africa Zone Group II	QF	17 July 2004	(Bulgaria) Yordan Kanev	Clay	(Italy) Massimo Bertolini (Italy) Andreas Seppi	L	4–6, 0–6, 1–6
2005 Europe/Africa Zone Group II	R1	5 March 2005	(Bulgaria) Yordan Kanev	Carpet (I)	(Georgia (country)) Lado Chikhladze (Georgia (country)) Irakli Ushangishvili	W	6–4, 3–6, 6–4, 6–4
2005 Europe/Africa Zone Group II	QF	16 July 2005	(Bulgaria) Radoslav Lukaev	Clay	(Finland) Jarkko Nieminen (Finland) Lauri Kiiski	W	7–5, 6–3, 6–7^{(5–7)}, 6–3
2005 Europe/Africa Zone Group II	SF	24 September 2005	(Bulgaria) Radoslav Lukaev	Hard	(Ukraine) Mikhail Filima (Ukraine) Orest Tereshchuk	L	4–6, 2–6, 6–7^{(3–7)}
2006 Europe/Africa Zone Group II	R1	8 April 2006	(Bulgaria) Ivaylo Traykov	Clay	(Cyprus) Marcos Baghdatis (Cyprus) Photos Kallias	W	4–6, 6–3, 2–6, 7–6^{(7–1)}, 6–0
2007 Europe/Africa Zone Group II	R1	7 April 2007	(Bulgaria) Ivaylo Traykov	Carpet (I)	(Latvia) Ernests Gulbis (Latvia) Deniss Pavlovs	L	5–7, 4–6, 2–6
2007 Europe/Africa Zone Group II	RPO	21 July 2007	(Bulgaria) Todor Enev	Clay	(Cyprus) Marcos Baghdatis (Cyprus) Photos Kallias	L	2–6, 3–6, 3–6
2015 Europe/Africa Zone Group II	R1	7 March 2015	(Bulgaria) Tihomir Grozdanov	Hard (I)	(Latvia) Mārtiņš Podžus (Latvia) Jānis Podžus	W	3–6, 2–6, 6–4, 7–5, 6–1

- RPO = Relegation Play–off

== Honours ==
Best Bulgarian tennis player – 2005
