= Alexander Kolyaskin Memorial =

Defunct tennis tournament
- Location: Donetsk, Ukraine
- Category: ATP Challenger Series
- Surface: Hard / Outdoors
- Draw: 32S/32Q/16D
- Prize money: $50,000

The Alexander Kolyaskin Memorial was a tennis tournament held in Donetsk, Ukraine from 2002 until 2008. The event was part of the ATP Challenger Series and was played on outdoor hardcourts.

== Past finals ==
=== Singles ===
Year	Champion	Runner-up	Score
2002	(Argentina) Federico Browne	(Germany) Simon Greul	6–2, 6–1
2003	(Czech Republic) Tomáš Cakl	(Ukraine) Orest Tereshchuk	5–7, 7–6, 7–6
2004	(Switzerland) Marco Chiudinelli	(Croatia) Saša Tuksar	6–3, 6–2
2005	(Poland) Łukasz Kubot	(Austria) Alexander Peya	6–4, 6–2
2006	(Serbia and Montenegro) Ilija Bozoljac	(Czech Republic) Tomáš Cakl	6–4, 3–6, 7–5
2007	(Croatia) Roko Karanušić	(Belgium) Dick Norman	6–4, 6–4
2008	(Russia) Igor Kunitsyn	(Ukraine) Sergei Bubka	6–3, 6–3

=== Doubles ===
Year	Champion	Runner-up	Score
2002	(Italy) Leonardo Azzaro (Argentina) Federico Browne	(Russia) Mikhail Elgin (Russia) Dmitry Vlasov	6–7, 7–6, 7–5
2003	(India) Harsh Mankad (United States) Jason Marshall	(Ukraine) Sergiy Stakhovsky (Russia) Andrei Stoliarov	6–2, 6–4
2004	(Russia) Igor Kunitsyn (Italy) Uros Vico	(Switzerland) Marco Chiudinelli (Croatia) Lovro Zovko	3–6, 6–3, 6–4
2005	(Ukraine) Mikhail Filima (Ukraine) Orest Tereshchuk	(Italy) Uros Vico (Croatia) Lovro Zovko	6–2, 6–3
2006	(Ukraine) Aleksandr Nedovesov (Ukraine) Aleksandr Yarmola	(Ukraine) Aleksandr Aksyonov (Ukraine) Vladyslav Klymenko	6–4, 6–2
2007	(Germany) Philipp Petzschner (Germany) Simon Stadler	(United States) Patrick Briaud (United States) Nicholas Monroe	3–6, 7–5, [10–6]
2008	(Belgium) Xavier Malisse (Belgium) Dick Norman	(Israel) Harel Levy (Israel) Noam Okun	4–6, 6–1, [13–11]
