= Yordan Kanev =

Bulgarian tennis player

Yordan Kanev Йордан Кънев
- Country (sports): Bulgaria
- Residence: Sofia, Bulgaria
- Born: 31 May 1984 (age 41); Pazardzhik, Bulgaria
- Retired: 2008
- Plays: Right-handed (two-handed backhand)
- Prize money: US$ 27,282

Singles
- Career record: 2–5 (at ATP Tour level, Grand Slam level, and in Davis Cup)
- Career titles: 1 ITF Futures
- Highest ranking: No. 306 (9 August 2004)

Doubles
- Career record: 1–1 (at ATP Tour level, Grand Slam level, and in Davis Cup)
- Career titles: 4 ITF Futures
- Highest ranking: No. 366 (13 September 2004)
- Last updated on: 29 September 2021.

Yordan Kanev (Bulgarian: Йордан Кънев, born 31 May 1984) is a former professional tennis player from Bulgaria. Between 2004 and 2007 he was frequently part of Bulgaria's Davis Cup national team. On 9 August 2004, he reached his highest ATP singles ranking of 306 whilst his best doubles ranking was 366 on 13 September 2004.

== Year-end rankings ==
Year	2001	2002	2003	2004	2005	2006	2007	2008
Singles	-	1017	461	380	1032	791	984	1823
Doubles	1536	-	-	-	827	-	783	-

== Challenger and Futures Finals ==
=== Singles: 4 (1–3) ===
Legend (singles) ATP Challenger Tour (0–0) ITF Futures (1–3)	Titles by surface Hard (0–0) Clay (1–3) Grass (0–0) Carpet (0–0)

Result	W–L	Date	Tournament	Tier	Surface	Opponent	Score
Win	1–0	Aug 2003	Egypt F1, Cairo	Futures	Clay	(Czech Republic) Jaroslav Pospíšil	6–4, 7–6^{(7–4)}
Loss	1–1	Mar 2004	India F2, Kolkata	Futures	Clay	(India) Somdev Devvarman	4–6, 2–6
Loss	1–2	Jun 2004	Serbia & Montenegro F2, Belgrade	Futures	Clay	(Serbia and Montenegro) Nikola Ćirić	4–6, 7–6^{(7–1)}, 4–6
Loss	1–3	Jun 2006	Serbia & Montenegro F1, Belgrade	Futures	Clay	(Bulgaria) Ivaylo Traykov	4–6, 6–4, 1–6

=== Doubles: 11 (4–7) ===
Legend (doubles) ATP Challenger Tour (0–0) ITF Futures (4–7)	Titles by surface Hard (0–3) Clay (4–4) Grass (0–0) Carpet (0–0)

Result	W–L	Date	Tournament	Tier	Surface	Partner	Opponents	Score
Loss	0–1	Oct 2003	Cyprus F1, Nicosia	Futures	Clay	(Bulgaria) Ilia Kushev	(Greece) Elefterios Alexiou (Greece) Alexandros Jakupovic	3–6, 3–6
Loss	0–2	Mar 2004	India F2, Kolkata	Futures	Clay	(Bulgaria) Todor Enev	(India) Mustafa Ghouse (India) Vishal Uppal	4–6, 3–6
Win	1–2	Jun 2004	Serbia and Montenegro F3, Belgrade	Futures	Clay	(Bulgaria) Ilia Kushev	(Serbia and Montenegro) Nikola Ćirić (Serbia and Montenegro) Goran Tošić	6–7^{(8–10)}, 7–6^{(7–4)}, 6–0
Loss	1–3	Dec 2004	Qatar F4, Doha	Futures	Hard	(Bulgaria) Ilia Kushev	(Russia) Artem Sitak (Russia) Dmitri Sitak	6–7^{(5–7)}, 0–6
Loss	1–4	Dec 2004	Qatar F5, Doha	Futures	Hard	(Bulgaria) Ilia Kushev	(Russia) Artem Sitak (Russia) Dmitri Sitak	w/o
Loss	1–5	Mar 2005	Italy F5, Catania	Futures	Clay	(Italy) Stefano Ianni	(Italy) Flavio Cipolla (Italy) Francesco Piccari	3–6, 4–6
Loss	1–6	Nov 2005	Canada F1, Toronto	Futures	Hard	(Italy) Marco Crugnola	(Germany) Benjamin Becker (United States) Philip Stolt	6–7^{(4–7)}, 6–4, 4–6
Loss	1–7	Mar 2006	Egypt F2, Port Said	Futures	Clay	(North Macedonia) Predrag Rusevski	(Ukraine) Alexandr Dolgopolov (Italy) Giancarlo Petrazzuolo	1–6, 2–6
Win	2–7	Sep 2006	Bulgaria F1, Plovdiv	Futures	Clay	(Bulgaria) Ilia Kushev	(Sweden) Robert Gustafsson (United Kingdom) Jim May	7–6^{(7–3)}, 7–6^{(7–3)}
Win	3–7	Sep 2006	Bulgaria F3, Sofia	Futures	Clay	(Bulgaria) Ilia Kushev	(Bulgaria) Todor Enev (Bulgaria) Tihomir Grozdanov	7–6^{(7–4)}, 6–4
Win	4–7	Jun 2007	Macedonia F1, Skopje	Futures	Clay	(Bulgaria) Ilia Kushev	(Sweden) Daniel Danilović (North Macedonia) Lazar Magdinčev	1–6, 7–6^{(8–6)}, 6–4

== Davis Cup ==
Yordan Kanev debuted for the Bulgaria Davis Cup team in 2004. Since then he has 9 nominations with 8 ties played, his singles W/L record is 2–5 and doubles W/L record is 1–2 (3–7 overall).

=== Singles (2–5) ===
Edition	Round	Date	Surface	Opponent	W/L	Result
2004 Europe/Africa Zone Group II	R1	11 April 2004	Carpet (I)	(Egypt) Karim Maamoun	W	7–6^{(7–1)}, 6–3
2004 Europe/Africa Zone Group II	QF	18 July 2004	Clay	(Italy) Andreas Seppi	L	2–6, 5–7
2005 Europe/Africa Zone Group II	SF	25 September 2005	Hard	(Ukraine) Sergei Bubka	L	7–6^{(9–7)}, 4–6, 3–6
2006 Europe/Africa Zone Group II	R1	7 April 2006	Clay	(Cyprus) Marcos Baghdatis	L	1–6, 2–6, 2–6
2007 Europe/Africa Zone Group II	R1	8 April 2007	Carpet (I)	(Latvia) Deniss Pavlovs	L	3–6, 1–6
2007 Europe/Africa Zone Group II	QF	20 July 2007	Clay	(Cyprus) Marcos Baghdatis	L	2–6, 2–6, 2–6
2007 Europe/Africa Zone Group II	QF	22 July 2007	Clay	(Cyprus) Petros Baghdatis	W	6–4, 6–3

=== Doubles (1–2) ===
Edition	Round	Date	Partner	Surface	Opponents	W/L	Result
2004 Europe/Africa Zone Group II	QF	17 July 2004	(Bulgaria) Ilia Kushev	Clay	(Italy) Massimo Bertolini (Italy) Andreas Seppi	L	4–6, 0–6, 1–6
2005 Europe/Africa Zone Group II	R1	5 March 2005	(Bulgaria) Ilia Kushev	Carpet (I)	(Georgia (country)) Lado Chikhladze (Georgia (country)) Irakli Ushangishvili	W	6–4, 3–6, 6–4, 6–4
2006 Europe/Africa Zone Group II	QF	22 July 2006	(Bulgaria) Ivaylo Traykov	Clay	(Hungary) Kornél Bardóczky (Hungary) Gergely Kisgyörgy	L	6–4, 4–6, 4–6, 7–6^{(7–3)}, 9–11
