= Ivaylo Traykov =

Bulgarian tennis player

Ivaylo Traykov Ивайло Трайков
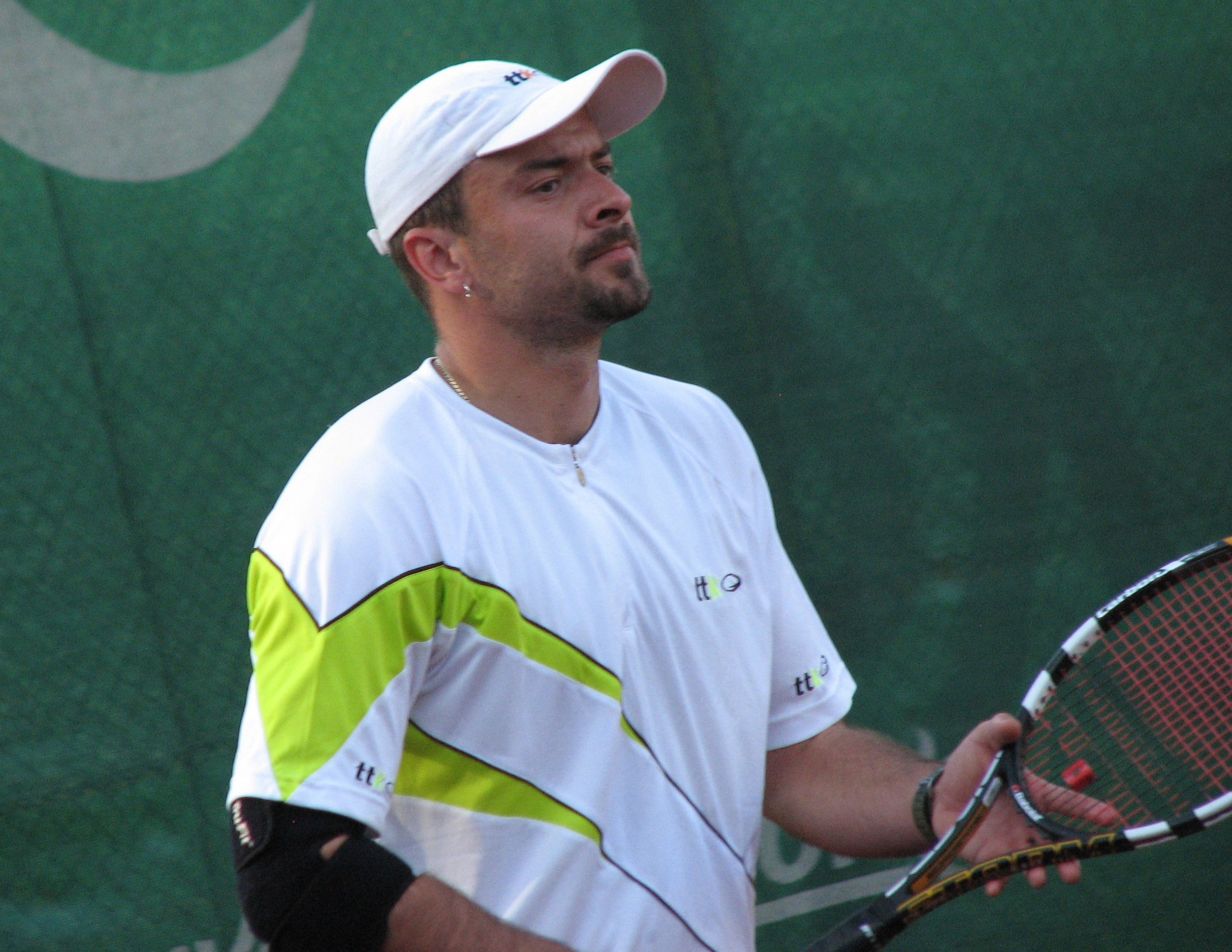
- Country (sports): Bulgaria
- Residence: Sofia, Bulgaria
- Born: 17 December 1978 (age 47) Sofia, Bulgaria
- Height: 1.88 m (6 ft 2 in)
- Turned pro: 1995
- Retired: 2010
- Plays: Right-handed (two-handed backhand)
- Prize money: US$ 105,448

Singles
- Career record: 6–9 (at ATP Tour level, Grand Slam level, and in Davis Cup)
- Career titles: 0; 1 Challengers, 12 Futures
- Highest ranking: No. 211 (8 September 2003)

Grand Slam singles results
- Australian Open: Q1 (2004)
- French Open: Q1 (2004)
- Wimbledon: Q1 (2000, 2001, 2004)

Doubles
- Career record: 2–5 (at ATP Tour level, Grand Slam level, and in Davis Cup)
- Career titles: 0; 0 Challengers, 3 Futures
- Highest ranking: No. 612 (2 December 2002)
- Last updated on: 31 January 2021.

Ivaylo Traykov (Bulgarian: Ивайло Трайков) is a former professional tennis player from Bulgaria.

== Personal ==
Traykov was born in Sofia, Bulgaria on 17 December 1978, to Toncho, an economist, and Mariana, an engineer. Taking up tennis at the age of 7, Traykov is coached and trained by his father. Traykov enjoys reading books, playing cards and chess, while he considers Pete Sampras to be his idol. His career goal is to break into the top 50 rankings. His favourite shot is the serve, while his favourite surface is hardcourt.

== Career ==
Traykov turned professional in 1995, and has spent the majority of his career playing in Futures and Challengers events. Throughout his career, he has won 1 Challenger tournament and 10 Futures tournaments. Traykov participated in the Wimbledon qualification events in 2000 and 2001, but lost in the first round for both years. He also participated in the Australian Open qualifiers in 2004, winning a match but failing to qualify.

In May 2001, Traykov made it into the main draw of the International Raiffeisen Grand Prix, in Sankt Pölten, as a lucky loser. He defeated Ján Krošlák in the first round, before falling to Ivan Ljubičić in the second round.

In 2006, he was declared the Tennis Player of the Year by the Bulgarian Tennis Federation, and has won five state individual championships (1996–1998, 2004 and 2006).

Traykov has represented Bulgaria in the Davis Cup since 1997, amassing a win–loss record of 8–8 in singles and 8–4 in doubles.

== Year-end rankings ==
Year	1995	1996	1997	1998	1999	2000	2001	2002	2003	2004	2005	2006	2007	2008	2009	2010	2011
Singles	1048	1170	777	350	320	269	373	281	238	755	1046	441	504	427	690	1063	-
Doubles	787	930	851	683	653	-	1051	620	1586	1140	1683	-	-	1456	967	728	1414

== Challenger and Futures Finals ==
=== Singles: 23 (13–10) ===
Legend (singles) ATP Challenger Tour (1–1) ITF Futures (12–9)	Titles by surface Hard (1–1) Clay (11–8) Grass (0–0) Carpet (1–1)

Result	W–L	Date	Tournament	Tier	Surface	Opponent	Score
Win	1–0	Feb 1998	Austria F2, Bergheim	Futures	Carpet (i)	(France) Julien Boutter	6–3, 6–2
Loss	1–1	Feb 1998	Austria F3, Mondseeland	Futures	Carpet (i)	(Czech Republic) Radek Štěpánek	4–6, 6–7
Loss	1–2	Aug 1998	Yugoslavia F5, Subotica	Futures	Clay	(Spain) Javier Perez-Vazquez	4–6, 1–6
Win	2–2	Aug 1998	Yugoslavia F6, Niš	Futures	Clay	(Austria) Matey Pampoulov	6–2, 6–3
Win	3–2	Aug 1998	Yugoslavia F7, Nikšić	Futures	Clay	(Spain) Javier Perez-Vazquez	6–3, 6–2
Loss	3–3	Feb 1999	Croatia F1, Zagreb	Futures	Hard	(Croatia) Ivan Ljubičić	3–6, 7–6, 2–6
Win	4–3	Sep 1999	Sofia, Bulgaria	Challenger	Clay	(Czech Republic) David Miketa	7–5, 6–2
Win	5–3	Jul 2002	Turkey F2, Istanbul	Futures	Hard	(Belgium) Jeroen Masson	6–3, 6–4
Win	6–3	Jun 2003	Serbia and Montenegro F1, Pančevo	Futures	Clay	(Serbia and Montenegro) Aleksander Slovič	7–6^{(7–4)}, 6–3
Loss	6–4	Jun 2003	Serbia and Montenegro F2, Belgrade	Futures	Clay	(Austria) Phillip Mullner	6–3, 6–7^{(2–7)}, 6–7^{(5–7)}
Loss	6–5	Jul 2003	Budaörs, Hungary	Challenger	Clay	(Czech Republic) Tomáš Berdych	2–6, 3–6
Win	7–5	Jun 2006	Macedonia F2, Skopje	Futures	Clay	(Bulgaria) Ilia Kushev	7–6^{(7–4)}, 6–7^{(3–7)}, 7–5
Win	8–5	Jun 2006	Serbia and Montenegro F1, Belgrade	Futures	Clay	(Bulgaria) Yordan Kanev	6–4, 4–6, 6–1
Loss	8–6	Aug 2006	Bulgaria F1, Plovdiv	Futures	Clay	(Bulgaria) Todor Enev	2–6, 5–7
Loss	8–7	May 2007	Bulgaria F2, Rousse	Futures	Clay	(Ukraine) Ivan Sergeyev	6–3, 2–6, 2–6
Loss	8–8	Jun 2007	Macedonia F1, Skopje	Futures	Clay	(North Macedonia) Predrag Rusevski	3–6, 4–6
Loss	8–9	Jun 2007	Macedonia F2, Skopje	Futures	Clay	(North Macedonia) Predrag Rusevski	3–6, 2–6
Win	9–9	Sep 2007	Bulgaria F7, Sofia	Futures	Clay	(Serbia) David Savić	6–2, 7–5
Win	10–9	May 2008	Bulgaria F1, Sofia	Futures	Clay	(Bulgaria) Simeon Ivanov	6–1, 6–2
Win	11–9	Aug 2008	Bulgaria F6, Bourgas	Futures	Clay	(Italy) Federico Torresi	3–0 ret.
Win	12–9	Sep 2008	Bulgaria F7, Sliven	Futures	Clay	(Spain) Pedro Clar	6–1, 3–6, 7–5
Loss	12–10	Sep 2008	Bulgaria F8, Stara Zagora	Futures	Clay	(Bulgaria) Tihomir Grozdanov	5–7, 0–1 ret.
Win	13–10	May 2009	Bulgaria F1, Sandanski	Futures	Clay	(Bulgaria) Tihomir Grozdanov	2–6, 6–4, 6–3

=== Doubles: 5 (3–2) ===
Legend (doubles) ATP Challenger Tour (0–0) ITF Futures (3–2)	Titles by surface Hard (0–0) Clay (2–1) Grass (0–0) Carpet (1–1)

Result	W–L	Date	Tournament	Tier	Surface	Partner	Opponents	Score
Loss	0–1	Feb 1998	Austria F3, Mondseeland	Futures	Carpet (i)	(Bulgaria) Milen Velev	(Czech Republic) Petr Pála (Slovenia) Borut Urh	4–6, 6–7
Win	1–1	Jul 1999	Greece F4, Alexandroupolis	Futures	Carpet	(Bulgaria) Milen Velev	(Chile) Fernando González (Pakistan) Aisam-ul-Haq Qureshi	7–6^{(7–2)}, 7–6^{(7–4)}
Win	2–1	Mar 2010	Turkey F3, Antalya	Futures	Clay	(Bulgaria) Tihomir Grozdanov	(Australia) Colin Ebelthite (Australia) Jarryd Maher	3–6, 6–4, [10–3]
Loss	2–2	May 2010	Bulgaria F2, Varna	Futures	Clay	(Bulgaria) Tihomir Grozdanov	(Romania) Alexandru Carpen (Romania) Adrian Cruciat	4–6, 4–6
Win	3–2	May 2010	Bulgaria F3, Plovdiv	Futures	Clay	(Bulgaria) Tihomir Grozdanov	(Ukraine) Ivan Anikanov (Moldova) Roman Tudoreanu	6–4, 6–3

== Davis Cup ==
Ivaylo Traykov debuted for the Bulgaria Davis Cup team in 1997. Since then he has 16 nominations with 20 ties played, his singles W/L record is 8–8 and doubles W/L record is 8–6 (16–14 overall).

=== Singles (8–8) ===
Edition	Round	Date	Surface	Opponent	W/L	Result
1998 Europe/Africa Zone Group II	RPO	19 July 1998	Clay	(Luxembourg) Pascal Schaul	W	6–3, 6–1
1999 Europe/Africa Zone Group II	R1	30 April 1999	Clay	(Togo) Jean-Kome Loglo	W	6–4, 5–7, 6–3, 4–6, 6–1
1999 Europe/Africa Zone Group II	QF	18 July 1999	Clay	(Hungary) Gergely Kisgyörgy	L	2–6, 7–6^{(7–4)}, 5–7
2000 Europe/Africa Zone Group II	R1	28 April 2000	Clay	(Greece) Solon Peppas	W	6–1, 6–3, 7–6^{(7–2)}
2000 Europe/Africa Zone Group II	QF	21 July 2000	Clay	(Israel) Lior Mor	W	7–6^{(7–4)}, 4–6, 6–4, 6–4
2000 Europe/Africa Zone Group II	QF	23 July 2000	Clay	(Israel) Harel Levy	L	7–6^{(7–5)}, 6–7^{(8–10)}, 6–7^{(3–7)}, 6–7^{(6–8)}
2003 Europe/Africa Zone Group II	R1	4 April 2003	Carpet (I)	(Ukraine) Orest Tereshchuk	L	6–7^{(2–7)}, 7–6^{(7–4)}, 6–3, 6–7^{(6–8)}, 4–6
2003 Europe/Africa Zone Group II	R1	6 April 2003	Carpet (I)	(Ukraine) Andrey Stepanov	W	7–6^{(7–3)}, 6–4, 7–6^{(7–3)}
2004 Europe/Africa Zone Group II	R1	9 April 2004	Carpet (I)	(Egypt) Karim Maamoun	W	6–2, 6–3, 6–4
2004 Europe/Africa Zone Group II	QF	16 July 2004	Clay	(Italy) Filippo Volandri	L	4–6, 2–6, 4–6
2005 Europe/Africa Zone Group II	R1	4 March 2005	Carpet (I)	(Georgia (country)) Lado Chikhladze	L	6–7^{(5–7)}, 6–3, 6–7^{(3–7)}, 3–6
2005 Europe/Africa Zone Group II	R1	6 March 2005	Carpet (I)	(Georgia (country)) David Kvernadze	W	6–2, 6–7^{(7–9)}, 7–6^{(7–0)}
2006 Europe/Africa Zone Group II	QF	21 July 2006	Clay	(Hungary) Sebő Kiss	L	3–6, 3–6, 3–6
2007 Europe/Africa Zone Group II	R1	6 April 2007	Carpet (I)	(Latvia) Ernests Gulbis	L	3–6, 2–6, 3–6
2007 Europe/Africa Zone Group II	R1	8 April 2007	Carpet (I)	(Latvia) Rihards Emulins	W	6–2, 7–5
2007 Europe/Africa Zone Group II	RPO	6 April 2007	Clay	(Cyprus) Photos Kallias	L	6–7^{(2–7)}, 1–6, 2–6

=== Doubles (8–6) ===
Edition	Round	Date	Partner	Surface	Opponents	W/L	Result
1997 Europe/Africa Zone Group III	RR	21 May 1997	(Bulgaria) Ivo Bratanov	Clay	(Malta) Gordon Asciak (Malta) Mark Schembri	W	7–6^{(10–8)}, 6–3
1997 Europe/Africa Zone Group III	RR	22 May 1997	(Bulgaria) Ivo Bratanov	Clay	(Estonia) Raigo Saluste (Estonia) Gert Vilms	W	6–2, 6–4
1997 Europe/Africa Zone Group III	RR	23 May 1997	(Bulgaria) Ivo Bratanov	Clay	(Kenya) Allan Cooper (Kenya) Norbert Oduor	W	6–3, 6–2
1997 Europe/Africa Zone Group III	SF	24 May 1997	(Bulgaria) Ivo Bratanov	Clay	(Moldova) Evghenii Plugariov (Moldova) Maxim Savitski	W	6–1, 6–3
1997 Europe/Africa Zone Group III	F	25 May 1997	(Bulgaria) Ivo Bratanov	Clay	(Monaco) Christophe Boggetti (Monaco) Sebastien Graeff	W	6–7^{(6–8)}, 6–2, 6–1
1999 Europe/Africa Zone Group II	R1	1 May 1999	(Bulgaria) Milen Velev	Clay	(Togo) Jean-Kome Loglo (Togo) Kossi Loglo	W	6–2, 6–4, 6–4
1999 Europe/Africa Zone Group II	QF	17 July 1999	(Bulgaria) Milen Velev	Clay	(Hungary) Zoltán Böröczky (Hungary) Attila Sávolt	L	3–6, 6–2, 3–6, 6–3, 5–7
2000 Europe/Africa Zone Group II	1R	29 April 2000	(Bulgaria) Orlin Stanoytchev	Clay	(Greece) Konstantinos Economidis (Greece) Anastasios Vasiliadis	L	6–3, 6–7^{(1–7)}, 4–6, 6–7^{(5–7)}
2004 Europe/Africa Zone Group II	R1	10 April 2004	(Bulgaria) Todor Enev	Carpet (I)	(Egypt) Amr Ghoneim (Egypt) Karim Maamoun	W	6–3, 7–5, 6–2
2006 Europe/Africa Zone Group II	R1	8 April 2006	(Bulgaria) Ilia Kushev	Clay	(Cyprus) Marcos Baghdatis (Cyprus) Photos Kallias	W	4–6, 6–3, 2–6, 7–6^{(7–1)}, 6–0
2006 Europe/Africa Zone Group II	QF	22 July 2006	(Bulgaria) Yordan Kanev	Clay	(Hungary) Kornél Bardóczky (Hungary) Gergely Kisgyörgy	L	6–4, 4–6, 4–6, 7–6^{(7–3)}, 9–11
2007 Europe/Africa Zone Group II	R1	7 April 2007	(Bulgaria) Ilia Kushev	Carpet (I)	(Latvia) Ernests Gulbis (Latvia) Deniss Pavlovs	L	5–7, 4–6, 2–6
2009 Europe/Africa Zone Group II	QF	11 July 2009	(Bulgaria) Todor Enev	Clay	(Latvia) Ernests Gulbis (Latvia) Deniss Pavlovs	L	4–6, 4–6, 4–6
2010 Europe/Africa Zone Group II	QF	10 July 2010	(Bulgaria) Grigor Dimitrov	Clay	(Slovenia) Luka Gregorc (Slovenia) Grega Žemlja	L	7–6^{(7–3)}, 6–7^{(2–7)}, 6–7^{(12–14)}, 3–6

- RPO = Relegation playoff
- RR = Round robin
