= Luben Pampoulov =

Austrian tennis player

- Full name: Luben Bojidarov Pampoulov
- Country (sports): Austria
- Born: 14 March 1981 (age 44); Sofia, Bulgaria
- Height: 6 ft 1 in (185 cm)
- Plays: Left-handed
- Prize money: $28,605

Singles
- Highest ranking: No. 392 (9 October 2000)

Doubles
- Career record: 0–2
- Career titles: 1 Challenger
- Highest ranking: No. 346 (25 June 2001)

Luben Bojidarov Pampoulov (born 14 March 1981) is an Austrian former professional tennis player. Pampoulov co-founded Silicon Valley company GSV Asset Management.

== Biography ==
Born in Sofia, Pampoulov left Bulgaria for Austria at the age of 10 and grew up in the city of Dornbirn. He comes from a tennis background, with both his father Bozhidar Pampoulov and uncle Matei being former Bulgarian Davis Cup players.

Pampoulov, a left-handed player, reached a best singles ranking on the professional tour of world No. 392. As a doubles player he made two main draw appearances at the St. Poelten ATP Tour tournament and in 2003 won a Challenger title in his native Sofia.

In 2003 he left the tour to study and play tennis at UCLA. He wasn't able to compete in varsity tennis until 2004 due to eligibility rules, then in 2005 was captain of the NCAA championship winning team.

== Challenger titles ==
=== Doubles: (1) ===
Year	Tournament	Surface	Partner	Opponents	Score
2003	Sofia, Bulgaria	Clay	(Bulgaria) Ilia Kushev	(Bulgaria) Todor Enev (Bulgaria) Dimo Tolev	6–3, 6–1
