= Jan Frode Andersen =

Norwegian tennis player

- Country (sports): Norway
- Residence: Oslo, Norway
- Born: August 29, 1972 (age 53) Asker, Norway
- Height: 191 cm (6 ft 3 in)
- Turned pro: 1997
- Retired: 2005
- Plays: Left-handed (two-handed backhand)
- Prize money: US$312,946

Singles
- Career record: 24–22
- Career titles: 0; 3 Challenger, 2 Futures
- Highest ranking: No. 135 (29 March 1999)

Grand Slam singles results
- Australian Open: Q3 (1999)
- French Open: 2R (2001)
- Wimbledon: Q1 (2000, 2001, 2002, 2004, 2005)
- US Open: Q2 (2003)

Doubles
- Career record: 4–8
- Career titles: 0; 0 Challenger, 0 Futures
- Highest ranking: No. 295 (14 July 2003)

Team competitions
- Davis Cup: 30–22
- Last updated on: 25 January 2022.

Jan Frode Andersen (born 29 August 1972) is a Norwegian former tennis player. He played tennis for Norway, including competing in at least 60 countries over a span of 8 years after turning professional in 1997. He represented Norway in the Davis Cup for 10 consecutive years compiling a 30–22 record (25-14 in singles). His highest ATP ranking was 135. This makes him the third best player in Norwegian history, after Christian Ruud and Casper Ruud.

He was also a television commentator for the Norwegian Broadcasting Corporation, and he earned a bachelor's degree in Business & Administration from the University of Arizona in 1996.

Born in Asker, he grew up in Hamar.

== ATP Challenger and ITF Futures finals ==
=== Singles: 12 (5–7) ===
Legend ATP Challenger (3–7) ITF Futures (2–0)	Finals by surface Hard (0–0) Clay (5–7) Grass (0–0) Carpet (0–0)

Result	W–L	Date	Tournament	Tier	Surface	Opponent	Score
Win	1-0	Sep 1997	Budapest, Hungary	Challenger	Clay	(Brazil) Francisco Costa	7–6^{(7–1)}, 2–6, 6–2
Loss	1-1	Jun 1998	Furth, Germany	Challenger	Clay	(Norway) Christian Ruud	4–6, 5–7
Loss	1-2	Sep 1998	Edinburgh, United Kingdom	Challenger	Clay	(Sweden) Tomas Nydahl	4–6, 1–6
Loss	1-3	Oct 1998	Barcelona, Spain	Challenger	Clay	(Spain) Fernando Vicente	3–6, 3–6
Win	2-3	May 2000	Germany F2, Esslingen	Futures	Clay	(France) Nicolas Thomann	3–6, 6–3, 6–4
Loss	2-4	May 2000	Samarkand, Uzbekistan	Challenger	Clay	(Russia) Mikhail Youzhny	6–7^{(7–9)}, 6–2, 6–7^{(8–10)}
Win	3-4	Jul 2000	Eisenach, Germany	Challenger	Clay	(Brazil) Francisco Costa	7–6^{(7–5)}, 6–3
Loss	3-5	Sep 2000	Freudenstadt, Germany	Challenger	Clay	(Czech Republic) Michal Tabara	4–6, 4–6
Win	4-5	May 2001	Germany F2, Esslingen	Futures	Clay	(Sweden) Joachim Johansson	5–3 ret.
Win	5-5	Jun 2003	Furth, Germany	Challenger	Clay	(Spain) Óscar Hernández	2–6, 6–2, 6–2
Loss	5-6	Jul 2003	Zell, Germany	Challenger	Clay	(Socialist Federal Republic of Yugoslavia) Janko Tipsarević	6–7^{(1–7)}, 7–5, 4–6
Loss	5-7	Sep 2004	Freudenstadt, Germany	Challenger	Clay	(Spain) Santiago Ventura	3–6, 6–1, 3–6

=== Doubles: 6 (0–6) ===
Legend ATP Challenger (0–5) ITF Futures (0–1)	Finals by surface Hard (0–1) Clay (0–5) Grass (0–0) Carpet (0–0)

Result	W–L	Date	Tournament	Tier	Surface	Partner	Opponents	Score
Loss	0–1	Aug 2002	Graz, Austria	Challenger	Hard	(Austria) Oliver Marach	(Poland) Mariusz Fyrstenberg (Poland) Marcin Matkowski	3–6, 4–6
Loss	0–2	Sep 2002	Budapest, Hungary	Challenger	Clay	(Germany) Oliver Gross	(Australia) Paul Baccanello (Argentina) Sergio Roitman	4–6, 7–6^{(7–5)}, 5–6 ret.
Loss	0–3	Nov 2002	Spain F19, Gran Canaria	Futures	Clay	(Norway) Stian Boretti	(Spain) Carlos Martinez-Comet (Spain) Germán Puentes Alcañiz	3–6, 6–7^{(4–7)}
Loss	0–4	Jul 2003	Zell, Germany	Challenger	Clay	(Austria) Oliver Marach	(Germany) Karsten Braasch (Germany) Franz Stauder	3–6, 6–4, 3–6
Loss	0–5	Sep 2003	Aschaffenburg, Germany	Challenger	Clay	(Germany) Philipp Petzschner	(Germany) Karsten Braasch (Germany) Franz Stauder	4–6, 5–7
Loss	0–6	Jun 2005	Furth, Germany	Challenger	Clay	(Sweden) Johan Landsberg	(Israel) Amir Hadad (Israel) Harel Levy	1–6, 2–6

== Performance timeline ==
Key
W	F	SF	QF	#R	RR	Q#	DNQ	A	NH

(W) winner; (F) finalist; (SF) semifinalist; (QF) quarterfinalist; (#R) rounds 4, 3, 2, 1; (RR) round-robin stage; (Q#) qualification round; (DNQ) did not qualify; (A) absent; (NH) not held; (SR) strike rate (events won / competed); (W–L) win–loss record.

=== Singles ===
Tournament	1998	1999	2000	2001	2002	2003	2004	2005	SR	W–L	Win%
Grand Slam tournaments
Australian Open	A	Q3	Q1	Q1	Q2	Q1	Q2	Q1	0 / 0	0–0	–
French Open	Q1	Q1	Q1	2R	Q1	A	Q2	Q2	0 / 1	1–1	50%
Wimbledon	A	A	Q1	Q1	Q1	A	Q1	Q1	0 / 0	0–0	–
US Open	A	A	A	Q1	Q1	Q2	A	A	0 / 0	0–0	–
Win–loss	0–0	0–0	0–0	1–1	0–0	0–0	0–0	0–0	0 / 1	1–1	50%
ATP World Tour Masters 1000
Indian Wells	A	A	A	A	Q1	A	Q1	A	0 / 0	0–0	–
Miami	A	1R	A	A	A	A	Q1	A	0 / 1	0–1	0%
Monte Carlo	A	Q1	A	A	A	A	A	A	0 / 0	0–0	–
Paris	A	A	A	A	A	Q1	A	A	0 / 0	0–0	–
Win–loss	0–0	0–1	0–0	0–0	0–0	0–0	0–0	0–0	0 / 1	0–1	0%
