= Mikhail Filima =

Ukrainian tennis player and coach

- Country (sports): Ukraine
- Born: 17 November 1982 (age 42); Kiev, Ukrainian SSR, Soviet Union
- Plays: Right-handed
- Prize money: $14,416

Singles
- Highest ranking: No. 574 (14 June 2004)

Doubles
- Career titles: 1 Challenger / 7 ITF
- Highest ranking: No. 288 (10 April 2006)

Mikhail Filima (born 17 November 1982) is a Ukrainian tennis coach and professional player.

== Biography ==
Born in Kiev, Filima was a right-handed player and featured in five Davis Cup ties for Ukraine across 2004 and 2005. His Davis Cup career included a singles win over Jan Frode Andersen, where he came from two sets down to defeat his better ranked Norwegian opponent and secure the tie for Ukraine.

Filima played briefly at ATP Challenger level, with his best singles performance a semi-final appearance at Donetsk in 2005. At the same tournament he partnered with Davis Cup teammate Orest Tereshchuk to win the doubles event. He won a further seven doubles tournament on the ITF circuit.

Since 2016 he has been captain of the Ukraine Fed Cup team. He previously captained the Davis Cup team, which he led to the World Group play-offs on three occasions.

== Challenger titles ==
=== Doubles: (1) ===
Year	Tournament	Surface	Partner	Opponents	Score
2005	Donetsk, Ukraine	Hard	(Ukraine) Orest Tereshchuk	(Italy) Uros Vico (Croatia) Lovro Zovko	6–2, 6–3
