= Predrag Rusevski =

Macedonian tennis player

- Country (sports): Macedonia
- Born: 3 August 1983 (age 41)
- Turned pro: 2000
- Retired: 2011
- Plays: Right-handed (two-handed backhand)
- Prize money: $60,927

Singles
- Career record: 6–9
- Career titles: 0
- Highest ranking: No. 242 (11 February 2008)

Doubles
- Career record: 6–4
- Career titles: 0
- Highest ranking: No. 248 (16 June 2008)
- Last updated on: 1 February 2010.

Predrag Rusevski (Macedonian: Предраг Русевски; born 3 August 1983) is a retired professional Macedonian tennis player. He has been the Macedonia Davis Cup team's most active player ever.

== Career ==
Rusevski has played most of his career on the Futures and Challenger circuit. He has played in one ATP tournament, losing in the first round of 2007 Umag Open to Viktor Troicki, who ousted in the next round No. 1 seed Novak Djokovic.

=== Singles titles (10) ===
Legend (singles)
ATP Tour (0)
Challengers (0)
Futures (10)

No.	Date	Tournament	Surface	Opponent in the final	Score
1.	June 26, 2006	Belgrade	Clay	(Bulgaria) Ilia Kushev	6–4, 6–1
2.	August 14, 2006	Vinkovci	Clay	(Czech Republic) Dušan Lojda	3–6, 7–6, 7–5
3.	March 12, 2007	Accra	Clay	(Romania) Gabriel Moraru	6–4, 6–4
4.	March 19, 2007	Accra	Clay	(Romania) Adrian Gavrila	6–4, 6–3
5.	May 14, 2007	Sarajevo	Clay	(Cyprus) Photos Kallias	7–5, 6–0
6.	May 21, 2007	Brčko	Clay	(Bosnia and Herzegovina) Ivan Dodig	7–5, 7–5
7.	May 28, 2007	Prijedor	Clay	(Slovenia) Blaž Kavčič	6–3, 6–4
8.	June 4, 2007	Skopje	Clay	(Bulgaria) Ivaylo Traykov	6–3, 6–4
9.	June 11, 2007	Skopje	Clay	(Bulgaria) Ivaylo Traykov	6–3, 6–2
10.	March 31, 2008	Roma-Frascati	Clay	(Italy) Giulio Di Meo	6–3, 4–6, 6–1
