= Orest Tereshchuk =

Ukrainian tennis player

- Country (sports): Ukraine
- Residence: Donetsk, Ukraine
- Born: 18 August 1981 (age 43); Lviv, Soviet Union now Ukraine
- Turned pro: 1998
- Retired: 2007
- Plays: Right-handed
- Prize money: $118,077

Singles
- Career record: 8-6
- Career titles: 0
- Highest ranking: No. 240 (25 Feb 2002)

Doubles
- Career record: 9-6
- Career titles: 0
- Highest ranking: No. 101 (7 May 2007)

Grand Slam doubles results
- Wimbledon: 1R (2007)

Orest Tereshchuk (born 18 August 1981) is a former professional tennis player from Ukraine.

== Career ==
Tereshchuk began playing Davis Cup tennis for the Ukrainian national team in 1999. His last appearance in 2007 was his 18th tie for Ukraine, leveling Andrei Medvedev's record. He finished with a 22/10 career record, second only to Medvedev.

On the ATP Tour he made doubles appearances in the 2006 Kremlin Cup (partnering Alexey Kedryuk) and the 2007 St. Petersburg Open (partnering Sergiy Stakhovsky) but was unable to progress past the opening round in either. He was however highly successful on the ATP Challenger circuit, winning 11 doubles titles. As a singles player, he had the best win of his career in a Challenger tournament at Dnipropetrovsk in 2003, when he defeated Karol Beck, then ranked 66th in the world.

The Ukrainian teamed up with Lars Burgsmüller at the 2007 Wimbledon Championships and after making it through qualifying they faced the Belgian pairing of Olivier Rochus and Kristof Vliegen in the first round. Tereschchuk and Burgsmüller lost the match in straight sets.

== Challenger titles ==
=== Doubles: (11) ===
No.	Year	Tournament	Surface	Partner	Opponents	Score
1.	2002	Magdeburg, Germany	Carpet	(Germany) Franz Stauder	(Belgium) Dick Norman (Netherlands) Djalmar Sistermans	6–4, 6–3
2.	2003	St. Petersburg, Russia	Clay	(Russia) Mikhail Elgin	(Kazakhstan) Yuri Schukin (Russia) Dmitry Vlasov	3–6, 6–3, 7–5
3.	2004	Belgrade, Serbia	Carpet	(Slovakia) Branislav Sekáč	(Serbia and Montenegro) Darko Mađarovski (Serbia and Montenegro) Janko Tipsarević	6–3, 6–4
4.	2005	Belgrade, Serbia	Carpet	(Russia) Igor Kunitsyn	(Czech Republic) Lukáš Dlouhý (Czech Republic) Jan Vacek	W/O
5.	2005	Bukhara, Uzbekistan	Hard	(Kazakhstan) Alexey Kedryuk	(India) Rohan Bopanna (South Korea) Kyu Tae Im	5–7, 6–4, 6–1
6.	2005	Donetsk, Ukraine	Hard	(Ukraine) Mikhail Filima	(Italy) Uros Vico (Croatia) Lovro Zovko	6–2, 6–3
7.	2006	Istanbul, Turkey	Hard	(Kazakhstan) Alexey Kedryuk	(Netherlands) Jasper Smit (Netherlands Antilles) Martijn van Haasteren	1–6, 7–5, [10–8]
8.	2006	Saransk, Russia	Clay	(Kazakhstan) Alexey Kedryuk	(Netherlands) Robin Haase (Israel) Dekel Valtzer	6–4, 5–7, [10–5]
9.	2006	Dnipropetrovsk, Ukraine	Hard	(Ukraine) Sergiy Stakhovsky	(Switzerland) Marco Chiudinelli (Croatia) Lovro Zovko	6–4, 6–0
10.	2007	Rabat, Morocco	Clay	(Kazakhstan) Yuri Schukin	(Australia) Peter Luczak (Serbia) Boris Pašanski	6–7^{(8–10)}, 7–6^{(7–4)}, [10–3]
11.	2007	Fes, Morocco	Clay	(Ukraine) Sergiy Stakhovsky	(Morocco) Rabie Chaki (Morocco) Mounir El Aarej	6–3, 6–3
