= Tuomas Ketola =

Finnish tennis player (born 1975)

- Country (sports): Finland
- Residence: Vammala, Finland
- Born: 21 February 1975 (age 51) Turku, Finland
- Height: 1.85 m (6 ft 1 in)
- Turned pro: 1994
- Prize money: $656,258

Singles
- Career record: 16–44
- Career titles: 0
- Highest ranking: No. 130 (4 May 1998)

Grand Slam singles results
- Wimbledon: 1R (1998, 2005)
- US Open: 2R (2004)

Doubles
- Career record: 25–44
- Career titles: 0
- Highest ranking: No. 76 (19 October 1998)

Grand Slam doubles results
- Australian Open: 1R (2002)
- French Open: 2R (1998)
- Wimbledon: 2R (1998, 2005)
- US Open: 1R (1998)

Tuomas Ketola (born 21 February 1975) is a Finnish former professional tennis player on the ATP Tour.

== Career ==
Ketola was the number two tennis player in Finland behind Jarkko Nieminen and reached a career high doubles ranking of 76 on October 19, 1998. In 2005, he reached the first round of Wimbledon in singles by defeating three opponents in the qualifying matches. However, he lost his first round main draw match to Álex Calatrava.

== Career finals ==
=== Doubles (1 runner-up) ===
Result	W–L	Date	Tournament	Surface	Partner	Opponents	Score
Loss	0–1	Apr 1998	Hong Kong, Hong Kong	Hard	(South Africa) Neville Godwin	(Zimbabwe) Byron Black (United States) Alex O'Brien	5–7, 1–6

== See also ==
- List of Finland Davis Cup team representatives
