= 2002 Davis Cup =

2002 edition of the Davis Cup

Details
- Duration: 8 February – 1 December 2002
- Edition: 91st
- Teams: 130

Champion
- Winning nation: Russia

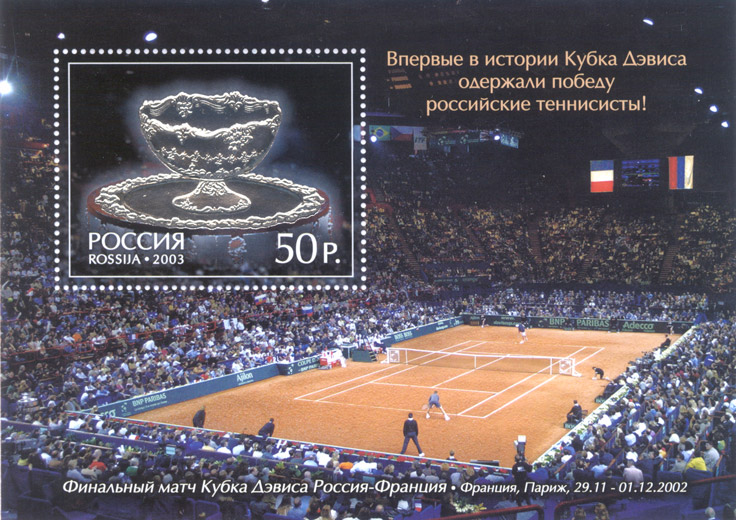
A 2003 Russian souvenir sheet commemorating the victory in the final.

The 2002 Davis Cup (also known as the 2002 Davis Cup by BNP Paribas for sponsorship purposes) was the 91st edition of the Davis Cup, the most important tournament between national teams in men's tennis. 130 teams entered the competition, 16 in the World Group, 28 in the Americas Zone, 32 in the Asia/Oceania Zone, and 54 in the Europe/Africa Zone. Kyrgyzstan made its first appearances in the tournament.

BNP Paribas became the Davis Cup's new Title Sponsor from this year's tournament, taking over from NEC, the previous sponsor since the 1981 tournament.

Russia defeated the defending champions France in the final, held at the Palais Omnisports de Paris-Bercy in Paris, France, on 29 November–1 December, to win their first title. This is the only time in the history of the competition that a two-set deficit has been turned around in a live fifth rubber of a Final.

== World Group ==
Participating teams
Argentina	Australia	Brazil	Croatia
Czech Republic	France	Germany	Great Britain
Morocco	Netherlands	Russia	Slovakia
Spain	Sweden	Switzerland	United States

=== Draw ===
First round 8–10 February
Metz, France (indoor clay)
1	France	3
Netherlands	2
Ostrava, Czech Republic (indoor carpet)
Czech Republic	4
S	Brazil	1
Zaragoza, Spain (indoor clay)
S	Spain	3
Morocco	2
Oklahoma City, OK, United States (indoor hard)
S	United States	5
Slovakia	0
Moscow, Russia (indoor clay)
Switzerland	2
S	Russia	3
Birmingham, England (indoor carpet)
Great Britain	2
S	Sweden	3
Zagreb, Croatia (indoor carpet)
Croatia	4
S	Germany	1
Buenos Aires, Argentina (clay)
Argentina	5
2	Australia	0

Quarterfinals; 5–7 April
Pau, France (indoor carpet)
1	France	3
Czech Republic	1
Houston, TX, United States (grass)
S	Spain	1
S	United States	3
Moscow, Russia (indoor clay)
S	Russia	4
S	Sweden	1
Buenos Aires, Argentina (clay)
Croatia	2
Argentina	3

Semifinals; 20–22 September
Paris, France (clay)
1	France	3
S	United States	2
Moscow, Russia (indoor carpet)
S	Russia	3
Argentina	2

Final; 29 November–1 December
Paris, France (indoor clay)
1	France	2
S	Russia	3

=== Final ===
France vs. Russia

France
2
Palais Omnisports de Paris-Bercy, Paris, France
29 November–1 December 2002
Clay (indoors)

Russia
3

			1	2	3	4	5
1	(France) (Russia)	Paul-Henri Mathieu; Marat Safin	4; 6	6; 3	1; 6	4; 6
2	(France) (Russia)	Sébastien Grosjean; Yevgeny Kafelnikov	7^{7} 6^{3}	6; 3	6; 0
3	(France) (Russia)	Nicolas Escudé / Fabrice Santoro; Yevgeny Kafelnikov / Marat Safin	6; 3	3; 6	5; 7	6; 3	6; 4
4	(France) (Russia)	Sébastien Grosjean; Marat Safin	3; 6	2; 6	6^{11} 7^{13}
5	(France) (Russia)	Paul-Henri Mathieu; Mikhail Youzhny	6; 3	6; 2	3; 6	5; 7	4; 6

== World Group qualifying round ==
Date: 20–22 September

The eight losing teams in the World Group first round ties and eight winners of the Zonal Group I final round ties competed in the World Group qualifying round for spots in the 2003 World Group.

Home team	Score	Visiting team	Location	Venue	Door	Surface
Australia	5–0	India	Adelaide	Memorial Drive	Outdoor	Hard
Zimbabwe	1–4	Belgium	Harare	City Sports Centre	Indoor	Hard
Brazil	4–0	Canada	Rio de Janeiro	Universidade Veiga de Almeida	Outdoor	Clay
Germany	5–0	Venezuela	Karlsruhe	Europahalle	Indoor	Hard
Great Britain	3–2	Thailand	Birmingham	National Indoor Arena	Indoor	Carpet
Finland	1–4	Netherlands	Turku	Turkuhalli	Indoor	Carpet
Slovakia	1–4	Romania	Prešov	Mestská hala	Indoor	Carpet
Morocco	2–3	Switzerland	Casablanca	Complexe Al Amal	Outdoor	Clay

- Australia, Brazil, Germany, Great Britain, Netherlands and Switzerland remain in the World Group in 2003.
- Belgium and Romania are promoted to the World Group in 2003.
- Canada, Finland, India, Thailand, Venezuela and Zimbabwe remain in Zonal Group I in 2003.
- Morocco and Slovakia are relegated to Zonal Group I in 2003.

== Americas Zone ==
=== Group I ===
Second Round Play-offs
Nassau, Bahamas (hard)
Bahamas	3
Mexico	2

First Round Play-offs
Guayaquil, Ecuador (clay)
Ecuador	5
Bahamas	0
Querétaro, Mexico (indoor carpet)
Mexico	2
Chile	3

First Round
S	Ecuador
bye
Nassau, Bahamas (hard)
Venezuela	3
Bahamas	2
Waterloo, Canada (indoor carpet)
Canada	4
Mexico	1
bye
S	Chile

Second Round
Barquisimeto, Venezuela (hard)
S	Ecuador	2
Venezuela	3
Calgary, Canada (indoor carpet)
Canada	5
S	Chile	0

- Mexico relegated to Group II in 2003.
- Venezuela and Canada advance to World Group Play-off.

=== Group II ===
Play-offs
Guatemala City, Guatemala (hard)
Guatemala	2
Netherlands Antilles	3
Havana, Cuba (hard)
Cuba	5
Trinidad and Tobago	0

First Round
Guatemala City, Guatemala (hard)
1	Peru	4
Guatemala	1
Asunción, Paraguay (clay)
Netherlands Antilles	0
Paraguay	5
Villavicencio, Colombia (clay)
Cuba	0
Colombia	5
Port of Spain, Trinidad (hard)
Trinidad and Tobago	0
2	Uruguay	5

Second Round
Lambaré, Paraguay (clay)
1	Peru	3
Paraguay	2
Villavicencio, Colombia (clay)
Colombia	2
2	Uruguay	3

Third Round
Montevideo, Uruguay (clay)
1	Peru	4
2	Uruguay	1

- Guatemala and Trinidad and Tobago relegated to Group III in 2003.
- Peru promoted to Group I in 2003.

=== Group III ===
- Venue: San Salvador, El Salvador (outdoor clay)
- Date: 3–7 April

Rank	Team
1	Dominican Republic
2	Haiti
3	Jamaica
4	El Salvador
5	Honduras
6	Puerto Rico
7	Costa Rica
8	Panama

- Dominican Republic and Haiti promoted to Group II in 2003.
- Costa Rica and Panama relegated to Group IV in 2003.

=== Group IV ===
- Venue: National Tennis Centre, Calliaqua, Saint Vincent (outdoor hard)
- Date: 1–6 April

Team	Pld	W	L	MF	MA
Bolivia	5	5	0	13	2
Saint Lucia	5	4	1	12	3
Bermuda	5	3	2	8	7
Barbados	5	2	3	7	8
Eastern Caribbean	5	1	4	4	11
U.S. Virgin Islands	5	0	5	1	14

- Bolivia and Saint Lucia promoted to Group III for 2003.

== Asia/Oceania Zone ==
=== Group I ===
Second Round Play-offs
Jounieh, Lebanon (clay)
South Korea	5
Lebanon	0

First Round Play-offs
Tashkent, Uzbekistan (indoor hard)
Uzbekistan	4
South Korea	1
Surabaya, Indonesia (hard)
Indonesia	4
Lebanon	1

First Round
Bangkok, Thailand (hard)
Uzbekistan	2
Thailand	3
Gunsan, South Korea (indoor carpet)
Japan	3
South Korea	2
Invercargill, New Zealand (indoor carpet)
Indonesia	2
New Zealand	3
Beirut, Lebanon (indoor hard)
Lebanon	0
India	5

Second Round
Bangkok, Thailand (hard)
Thailand	4
Japan	1
Wellington, New Zealand (hard)
New Zealand	1
India	4

- Lebanon relegated to Group II in 2003.
- India and Thailand advance to World Group qualifying round.

=== Group II ===
Play-offs
Manila, Philippines (indoor clay)
Kuwait	2
Philippines	3
Causeway Bay, Hong Kong (indoor hard)
Malaysia	0
Hong Kong	5

First Round
Shenzhen, China (hard)
1	China	4
Kuwait	1
Almaty, Kazakhstan (indoor hard)
Kazakhstan	4
Philippines	1
Kuala Lumpur, Malaysia (indoor hard)
Pakistan	4
Malaysia	1
Causeway Bay, Hong Kong (outdoor hard)
Hong Kong	1
2	Chinese Taipei	4

Second Round
Wuhan, China (hard)
1	China	3
Kazakhstan	2
Lahore, Pakistan (grass)
Pakistan	4
2	Chinese Taipei	1

Third Round
Peshawar, Pakistan (grass)
1	China	2
Pakistan	3

- Kuwait and Malaysia relegated to Group III in 2003.
- Pakistan promoted to Group I in 2003.

=== Group III ===
- Venue: Enghelab Club, Tehran, Iran (outdoor clay)
- Date: 10–14 April

Rank	Team
1	Iran
2	Tajikistan
3	United Arab Emirates
4	Pacific Oceania
5	Qatar
6	Syria
7	Singapore
8	Saudi Arabia

- Iran and Tajikistan promoted to Group II in 2003.
- Singapore and Saudi Arabia relegated to Group IV in 2003.

=== Group IV ===
- Venue: National Centre, Dhaka, Bangladesh (outdoor hard)
- Date: 20–24 March

Rank	Team
1	Kyrgyzstan
2	Bahrain
3	Bangladesh
4	Oman
5	Sri Lanka
6	Iraq
7	Jordan
8	Brunei

- Kyrgyzstan and Bahrain promoted to Group III in 2003.

== Europe/Africa Zone ==
=== Group I ===
Second Round Play-offs
Follonica, Italy (indoor carpet)
S	Italy	4
Portugal	1
Ramat HaSharon, Israel (hard)
Israel	5
Greece	0

First Round Play-offs
S	Italy
bye
Minsk, Belarus (indoor carpet)
S	Belarus	4
Portugal	1
Israel
bye
bye
Greece

First Round
S	Italy
bye
Finland
bye
S	Belarus
bye
Harare, Zimbabwe (indoor hard)
Portugal	0
Zimbabwe	5
Tirol, Austria (indoor clay)
Austria	3
Israel	2
bye
S	Romania
bye
Greece
bye
S	Belgium

Second Round
Reggio Calabria, Italy (clay)
S	Italy	1
Finland	4
Harare, Zimbabwe (indoor hard)
S	Belarus	1
Zimbabwe	4
Constanța, Romania (indoor carpet)
Austria	0
S	Romania	5
Liège, Belgium (indoor carpet)
Greece	0
S	Belgium	5

- Greece and Portugal relegated to Group II in 2003.
- Belgium, Finland, Romania, and Zimbabwe advance to World Group qualifying round.

=== Group II ===
The Europe/Africa Zone was one of the three zones of the regional Davis Cup competition in 2002.

In the Europe/Africa Zone there were four different tiers, called groups, in which teams competed against each other to advance to the upper tier. Winners in Group II advanced to the Europe/Africa Zone Group I. Teams who lost their respective ties competed in the relegation play-offs, with winning teams remaining in Group II, whereas teams who lost their play-offs were relegated to the Europe/Africa Zone Group III in 2003.

== Participating nations ==
- Armenia
- Bulgaria
- Ivory Coast
- Denmark
- Egypt
- Ghana
- Hungary
- Ireland
- Latvia
- Luxembourg
- Moldova
- Norway
- Slovenia
- South Africa
- Ukraine
- Yugoslavia

=== Draw ===
Relegation Play-offs
Jūrmala, Latvia (clay)
Latvia	1
S	Ukraine	4
Cairo, Egypt (clay)
Egypt	5
Moldova	0
Pretoria, South Africa (hard)
South Africa	3
Hungary	2
Accra, Ghana (hard)
Ghana	4
Armenia	1

First Round
Odesa, Ukraine (clay)
S	Ukraine	2
Bulgaria	3
Liepāja, Latvia (clay)
Latvia	1
Ivory Coast	4
Chișinău, Moldova (clay)
S	Denmark	5
Moldova	0
Asker, Norway (clay)
Egypt	1
Norway	4
Belgrade, Yugoslavia (clay)
Yugoslavia	3
South Africa	2
Esch-sur-Alzette, Luxembourg (indoor hard)
Hungary	1
S	Luxembourg	4
Yerevan, Armenia (clay)
Armenia	0
Ireland	3
Ljubljana, Slovenia (clay)
Ghana	1
S	Slovenia	4

Second Round
Abidjan, Ivory Coast (hard)
Bulgaria	2
Ivory Coast	3
Hornbæk, Denmark (hard)
S	Denmark	2
Norway	3
Esch-sur-Alzette, Luxembourg (indoor hard)
Yugoslavia	2
S	Luxembourg	3
Portorož, Slovenia (clay)
Ireland	2
S	Slovenia	3

Third Round
Asker, Norway (clay)
Ivory Coast	1
Norway	4
Esch-sur-Alzette, Luxembourg (indoor hard)
S	Luxembourg	3
S	Slovenia	2

- Armenia, Hungary, Latvia, and Moldova relegated to Group III in 2003.
- Luxembourg and Norway promoted to Group I in 2003.

== First round ==
=== Ukraine vs. Bulgaria ===
Ukraine
2
Odesa LTC, Odesa, Ukraine
3–5 May 2002
Clay

Bulgaria
3

			1	2	3	4	5
1	(Ukraine) (Bulgaria)	Orest Tereshchuk; Milen Velev	6; 3	2; 6	6; 4	6; 1
2	(Ukraine) (Bulgaria)	Andrei Dernovskiy; Todor Enev	4; 6	1; 6	3; 6
3	(Ukraine) (Bulgaria)	Andrei Dernovskiy / Orest Tereshchuk; Todor Enev / Milen Velev	6^{5} 7^{7}	7^{7} 6^{5}	6^{4} 7^{7}	3; 6
4	(Ukraine) (Bulgaria)	Orest Tereshchuk; Todor Enev	6; 3	7^{7} 6^{1}	3; 6	6; 4
5	(Ukraine) (Bulgaria)	Andrei Dernovskiy; Milen Velev	5; 7	7; 5	4; 6	3; 6

=== Latvia vs. Ivory Coast ===
Latvia
1
Liepāja Tennis School, Liepāja, Latvia
3–5 May 2002
Clay

Ivory Coast
4

			1	2	3	4	5
1	(Latvia) (Ivory Coast)	Andis Juška; Valentin Sanon	2; 6	3; 6	6; 1	6; 4	1; 6
2	(Latvia) (Ivory Coast)	Andris Fiļimonovs; Claude N'Goran	6; 4	5; 7	1; 6	6^{4} 7^{7}
3	(Latvia) (Ivory Coast)	Andris Fiļimonovs / Andis Juška; Ilou Lonfo / Claude N'Goran	4; 6	6; 2	6; 3	1; 6	6; 3
4	(Latvia) (Ivory Coast)	Andris Fiļimonovs; Valentin Sanon	3; 6	1; 6	5; 7
5	(Latvia) (Ivory Coast)	Andis Juška; Claude N'Goran	3; 6	6^{2} 7^{7}

=== Moldova vs. Denmark ===
Moldova
0
Ali Ten TC, Chișinău, Moldova
3–5 May 2002
Clay

Denmark
5

			1	2	3	4	5
1	(Moldova) (Denmark)	Andrei Gorban; Kenneth Carlsen	0; 6	1; 6	3; 6
2	(Moldova) (Denmark)	Evghenii Plugariov; Patrik Langvardt	4; 6	4; 6	5; 7
3	(Moldova) (Denmark)	Andrei Gorban / Victor Ribas; Kenneth Carlsen / Patrik Langvardt	1; 6	0; 6	4; 6
4	(Moldova) (Denmark)	Evghenii Plugariov; Kasper Warming	4; 6	4; 6
5	(Moldova) (Denmark)	Andrei Gorban; Mik Ledvonova	3; 6	1; 6

=== Norway vs. Egypt ===
Norway
4
Asker TC, Asker, Norway
3–5 May 2002
Clay

Egypt
1

			1	2	3	4	5
1	(Norway) (Egypt)	Jan Frode Andersen; Amr Ghoneim	7^{7} 6^{5}	6; 0	6; 2
2	(Norway) (Egypt)	Stian Boretti; Karim Maamoun	5; 7	6; 3	6; 4	6; 4
3	(Norway) (Egypt)	Jan Frode Andersen / Helge Koll-Frafjord; Amr Ghoneim / Karim Maamoun	2; 6	6; 2	6; 3	6; 2
4	(Norway) (Egypt)	Helge Koll-Frafjord; Karim Maamoun	6; 2	5; 7	6; 4
5	(Norway) (Egypt)	Fredrik Aarum; Mohamed Mamoun	2; 6	6^{4} 7^{7}

=== Yugoslavia vs. South Africa ===
Yugoslavia
3
Partizan TC, Belgrade, Yugoslavia
3–5 May 2002
Clay

South Africa
2

			1	2	3	4	5
1	(Socialist Federal Republic of Yugoslavia) (South Africa)	Vladimir Pavićević; Justin Bower	6; 3	6; 2	5; 7	7^{7} 6^{2}
2	(Socialist Federal Republic of Yugoslavia) (South Africa)	Dušan Vemić; Louis Vosloo	6; 3	6; 4	3; 6	7^{7} 6^{5}
3	(Socialist Federal Republic of Yugoslavia) (South Africa)	Darko Mađarovski / Dušan Vemić; Jeff Coetzee / John-Laffnie de Jager	5; 7	4; 6	2; 6
4	(Socialist Federal Republic of Yugoslavia) (South Africa)	Vladimir Pavićević; Louis Vosloo	6; 3	6; 2	3; 6	7^{7} 6^{0}
5	(Socialist Federal Republic of Yugoslavia) (South Africa)	Vladimir Obradović; Justin Bower	5; 7	3; 6

=== Luxembourg vs. Hungary ===
Luxembourg
4
National Tennis Centre, Esch-sur-Alzette, Luxembourg
3–5 May 2002
Hard (indoors)

Hungary
1

			1	2	3	4	5
1	(Luxembourg) (Hungary)	Mike Scheidweiler; Kornél Bardóczky	6^{2} 7^{7}	6; 2	6; 2	7; 5
2	(Luxembourg) (Hungary)	Gilles Müller; Attila Sávolt	6; 3	7^{10} 6^{8}	6^{5} 7^{7}	6^{2} 7^{7}	6; 3
3	(Luxembourg) (Hungary)	Gilles Müller / Mike Scheidweiler; Gergely Kisgyörgy / Attila Sávolt	5; 7	6; 3	3; 6	6; 4	11; 9
4	(Luxembourg) (Hungary)	Gilles Kremer; Zsolt Tatár	6^{2} 7^{7}	7^{7} 6^{2}	6; 3
5	(Luxembourg) (Hungary)	Pascal Schaul; Gergely Kisgyörgy	4; 6	7^{7} 6^{5}	3; 6

=== Armenia vs. Ireland ===
Armenia
0
Olympic Sports School, Yerevan, Armenia
3–5 May 2002
Clay

Ireland
3

			1	2	3	4	5
1	(Armenia) (Republic of Ireland)	Tsolak Gevorgyan; John Doran	4; 6	1; 6	5; 7
2	(Armenia) (Republic of Ireland)	Hayk Hakobyan; Peter Clarke	0; 6	5; 7	2; 6
3	(Armenia) (Republic of Ireland)	Tsolak Gevorgyan / Harutyun Sofyan; Owen Casey / John Doran	5; 7	3; 6	4; 6
4	(Armenia) (Republic of Ireland)	Tsolak Gevorgyan; Peter Clarke						not played
5	(Armenia) (Republic of Ireland)	Hayk Hakobyan; John Doran						not played

=== Slovenia vs. Ghana ===
Slovenia
4
Zavod Tivoli Sports Centre, Ljubljana, Slovenia
3–5 May 2002
Clay

Ghana
1

			1	2	3	4	5
1	(Slovenia) (Ghana)	Iztok Božič; Gunther Darkey	7; 5	4; 6	7; 5	6; 0
2	(Slovenia) (Ghana)	Marko Tkalec; Henry Adjei-Darko	6; 1	6; 3	7; 5
3	(Slovenia) (Ghana)	Marko Tkalec / Matija Zgaga; Henry Adjei-Darko / Gunther Darkey	6; 3	6; 4	2; 6	6; 4
4	(Slovenia) (Ghana)	Matija Zgaga; Samuel Fumi	6; 3	6; 2
5	(Slovenia) (Ghana)	Boštjan Ošabnik; Henry Adjei-Darko	3; 6	6^{1} 7^{7}

== Second round ==
=== Ivory Coast vs. Bulgaria ===
Ivory Coast
3
Hôtel Ivoire, Abidjan, Ivory Coast
12–14 July 2002
Hard

Bulgaria
2

			1	2	3	4	5
1	(Ivory Coast) (Bulgaria)	Valentin Sanon; Ivo Bratanov	6; 2	7; 5	7^{8} 6^{6}
2	(Ivory Coast) (Bulgaria)	Claude N'Goran; Todor Enev	6; 3	5; 7	7^{7} 6^{2}	5; 7	3; 6
3	(Ivory Coast) (Bulgaria)	Claude N'Goran / Valentin Sanon; Todor Enev / Milen Velev	6; 4	5; 7	6; 2	1; 6	6; 4
4	(Ivory Coast) (Bulgaria)	Valentin Sanon; Todor Enev	7^{7} 6^{3}	6; 3	1; 6	6^{5} 7^{7}	1; 6
5	(Ivory Coast) (Bulgaria)	Claude N'Goran; Ivo Bratanov	6; 2	6; 3	2; 6	4; 6	6; 2

=== Denmark vs. Norway ===
Denmark
2
Havreholm Castle, Hornbæk, Denmark
12–14 July 2002
Hard

Norway
3

			1	2	3	4	5
1	(Denmark) (Norway)	Kenneth Carlsen; Stian Boretti	6; 4	6; 4	6; 1
2	(Denmark) (Norway)	Jonathan Printzlau; Jan Frode Andersen	1; 6	4; 6	2; 6
3	(Denmark) (Norway)	Thomas G Andersen / Kenneth Carlsen; Jan Frode Andersen / Helge Koll-Frafjord	7^{8} 6^{6}	4; 6	4; 6			retired
4	(Denmark) (Norway)	Kenneth Carlsen; Jan Frode Andersen	6; 4	7^{7} 6^{4}	2; 6	7^{7} 6^{5}
5	(Denmark) (Norway)	Patrik Langvardt; Stian Boretti	6^{3} 7^{7}	2; 6	6^{5} 7^{7}

=== Luxembourg vs. Yugoslavia ===
Luxembourg
3
National Tennis Centre, Esch-sur-Alzette, Luxembourg
12–14 July 2002
Hard (indoors)

Yugoslavia
2

			1	2	3	4	5
1	(Luxembourg) (Socialist Federal Republic of Yugoslavia)	Gilles Müller; Nenad Zimonjić	6; 2	6; 1	6; 3
2	(Luxembourg) (Socialist Federal Republic of Yugoslavia)	Mike Scheidweiler; Janko Tipsarević	4; 6	5; 7	6; 4	4; 6
3	(Luxembourg) (Socialist Federal Republic of Yugoslavia)	Gilles Müller / Mike Scheidweiler; Vladimir Pavićević / Nenad Zimonjić	4; 6	6; 1	1; 6	6^{7} 7^{9}
4	(Luxembourg) (Socialist Federal Republic of Yugoslavia)	Mike Scheidweiler; Vladimir Pavićević	6; 3	7; 5	6; 3
5	(Luxembourg) (Socialist Federal Republic of Yugoslavia)	Gilles Müller; Janko Tipsarević	4; 6	7^{7} 6^{5}	7^{7} 6^{4}	6; 4

=== Slovenia vs. Ireland ===
Slovenia
3
Marina S.R.C., Portorož, Slovenia
12–14 July 2002
Clay

Ireland
2

			1	2	3	4	5
1	(Slovenia) (Republic of Ireland)	Marko Tkalec; John Doran	7^{7} 6^{4}	2; 6	6; 4	7^{7} 6^{3}
2	(Slovenia) (Republic of Ireland)	Iztok Božič; Peter Clarke	4; 6	2; 6	2; 6
3	(Slovenia) (Republic of Ireland)	Marko Tkalec / Matija Zgaga; Peter Clarke / John Doran	6^{5} 7^{7}	6; 1	5; 7	2; 6
4	(Slovenia) (Republic of Ireland)	Marko Tkalec; Peter Clarke	4; 6	6; 4	6; 1	6; 1
5	(Slovenia) (Republic of Ireland)	Iztok Božič; David J. Mullins	6; 0	6; 2	7^{7} 6^{3}

== Relegation play-offs ==
=== Latvia vs. Ukraine ===
Latvia
1
Lielupe T.C., Jūrmala, Latvia
12–14 July 2002
Clay

Ukraine
4

			1	2	3	4	5
1	(Latvia) (Ukraine)	Andris Fiļimonovs; Andrei Dernovskiy	4; 6	4; 6	2; 6
2	(Latvia) (Ukraine)	Andis Juška; Orest Tereshchuk	1; 6	2; 6	2; 6
3	(Latvia) (Ukraine)	Andris Fiļimonovs / Andis Juška; Orest Tereshchuk / Sergei Yaroshenko	5; 7	2; 6	2; 6
4	(Latvia) (Ukraine)	Deniss Pavlovs; Sergei Yaroshenko	7^{7} 6^{5}	3; 6	4; 6
5	(Latvia) (Ukraine)	Andis Juška; Andrei Dernovskiy	6; 3	3; 1				retired

=== Egypt vs. Moldova ===
Egypt
5
Gatirah Sproting Club, Cairo, Egypt
12–14 July 2002
Clay

Moldova
0

			1	2	3	4	5
1	(Egypt) (Moldova)	Amr Ghoneim; Evghenii Plugariov	6; 2	2; 6	7; 5	6; 0
2	(Egypt) (Moldova)	Karim Maamoun; Andrei Gorban	6; 0	6; 4	6; 2
3	(Egypt) (Moldova)	Karim Maamoun / Amr Ghoneim; Sergei Cupțov / Andrei Gorban	6; 0	6; 4	6; 2
4	(Egypt) (Moldova)	Mohamed Mamoun; Alexandru Andronachi	6; 0	6; 2
5	(Egypt) (Moldova)	Mohammed Wafa; Sergei Cupțov	2; 6	6; 3	6; 4

=== South Africa vs. Hungary ===
South Africa
3
Groenkloof Stadium, Pretoria, South Africa
12–14 July 2002
Hard

Hungary
2

			1	2	3	4	5
1	(South Africa) (Hungary)	Rik de Voest; Gergely Kisgyörgy	6; 3	6; 4	6^{2} 7^{7}	7^{7} 6^{3}
2	(South Africa) (Hungary)	Wesley Moodie; Gábor Jaross	7^{7} 6^{5}	7^{7} 6^{4}	6; 2
3	(South Africa) (Hungary)	John-Laffnie de Jager / Robbie Koenig; Gergely Kisgyörgy / Balázs Veress	2; 6	6; 2	6; 2	6; 1
4	(South Africa) (Hungary)	Wesley Moodie; Gergely Kisgyörgy	5; 7	7^{7} 6^{5}	6^{5} 7^{7}
5	(South Africa) (Hungary)	Rik de Voest; Balázs Veress	1; 6	6; 2	3; 6

=== Ghana vs. Armenia ===
Ghana
4
Accra Sports Stadium, Accra, Ghana
12–14 July 2002
Hard

Armenia
1

			1	2	3	4	5
1	(Ghana) (Armenia)	Henry Adjei-Darko; Tsolak Gevorgyan	6; 3	7^{7} 6^{2}	6; 3
2	(Ghana) (Armenia)	Gunther Darkey; Harutyun Sofyan	7^{7} 6^{0}	6; 0	7^{7} 6^{3}
3	(Ghana) (Armenia)	Henry Adjei-Darko / Gunther Darkey; Tsolak Gevorgyan / Harutyun Sofyan	6; 3	6; 2	6; 4
4	(Ghana) (Armenia)	Kwasi Ahenkora; Tsolak Gevorgyan	6; 3	3; 6	7^{8} 6^{6}
5	(Ghana) (Armenia)	Frederick Egyir; Harutyun Sofyan	4; 6	3; 6

== Third round ==
=== Norway vs. Ivory Coast ===
Norway
4
Asker TC, Asker, Norway
20–22 September 2002
Clay

Ivory Coast
1

			1	2	3	4	5
1	(Norway) (Ivory Coast)	Jan Frode Andersen; Valentin Sanon	6; 2	6; 3	6; 0
2	(Norway) (Ivory Coast)	Stian Boretti; Claude N'Goran	7^{7} 6^{2}	3; 6	6; 3	6; 2
3	(Norway) (Ivory Coast)	Jan Frode Andersen / Stian Boretti; Claude N'Goran / Valentin Sanon	4; 6	6; 2	6; 3	6; 0
4	(Norway) (Ivory Coast)	Fredrik Aarum; Claude N'Goran	6; 3	3; 6	3; 6
5	(Norway) (Ivory Coast)	Stian Boretti; Valentin Sanon	6; 2	6; 0

=== Luxembourg vs. Slovenia ===
Luxembourg
3
National Tennis Centre, Esch-sur-Alzette, Luxembourg
20–22 September 2002
Hard (indoors)

Slovenia
2

			1	2	3	4	5
1	(Luxembourg) (Slovenia)	Mike Scheidweiler; Marko Tkalec	6; 1	3; 6	6; 3	7; 5
2	(Luxembourg) (Slovenia)	Gilles Kremer; Andrej Kračman	7^{8} 6^{6}	6; 3	6; 3
3	(Luxembourg) (Slovenia)	Gilles Müller / Mike Scheidweiler; Andrej Kračman / Marko Tkalec	6; 2	6; 4	6; 4
4	(Luxembourg) (Slovenia)	Gilles Kremer; Marko Tkalec	3; 6	6; 3	3; 6
5	(Luxembourg) (Slovenia)	Mike Scheidweiler; Andrej Kračman	4; 6	6^{4} 7^{7}

=== Group III ===
==== Zone A ====
- Venue: Arka TC, Gdynia, Poland
- Date: 8–12 May

Rank	Team
1	Poland
2	Tunisia
3	Estonia
4	Madagascar
5	Cyprus
6	North Macedonia
7	Mauritius

- Poland and Tunisia promoted to Group II in 2003.
- Mauritius relegated to Group IV in 2003.
- Zambia withdrew from the tournament and relegated to Group IV in 2003.

==== Zone B ====
- Venue: Antalya, Turkey
- Date: 3–7 April

Rank	Team
1	Monaco
2	Andorra
3	Turkey
4	Bosnia and Herzegovina
5	Lithuania
6	Namibia
7	Iceland
8	Botswana

- Monaco and Andorra promoted to Group II in 2003.
- Iceland and Botswana relegated to Group IV in 2003.

=== Group IV ===
==== Zone A ====
- Venue: Mombasa Sports Club, Mombasa, Kenya (outdoor hard)
- Date: 6–10 February

Rank	Team
1	Algeria
2	Angola
3	Kenya
4	Rwanda
5	Malta
6	Ethiopia
7	Djibouti

- Algeria and Angola promoted to Group III in 2003.

==== Zone B ====
- Venue: Centro Tennis Parco di Montecchio, San Marino (outdoor clay)
- Date: 12–16 June

	Zone B	GEO	AZE	SMR	NGR	LIE	UGA
1	Georgia (4–1)		2–1	3–0	1–2	2–1	3–0
2	Azerbaijan (4–1)	1–2		2–1	2–1	2–1	2–1
3	San Marino (3–2)	0–3	1–2		2–1	2–0	3–0
4	Nigeria (3–2)	2–1	1–2	1–2		2–1	3–0
5	Liechtenstein (1–4)	1–2	1–2	0–2	1–2		3–0
6	Uganda (0–5)	0–3	1–2	0–3	0–3	0–3	

- Georgia and Azerbaijan promoted to Group III in 2003.
