= List of Hungary Davis Cup team representatives =

This is a list of tennis players who have represented the Hungary Davis Cup team in an official Davis Cup match. Hungary has taken part in the competition since 1924.

== Players ==
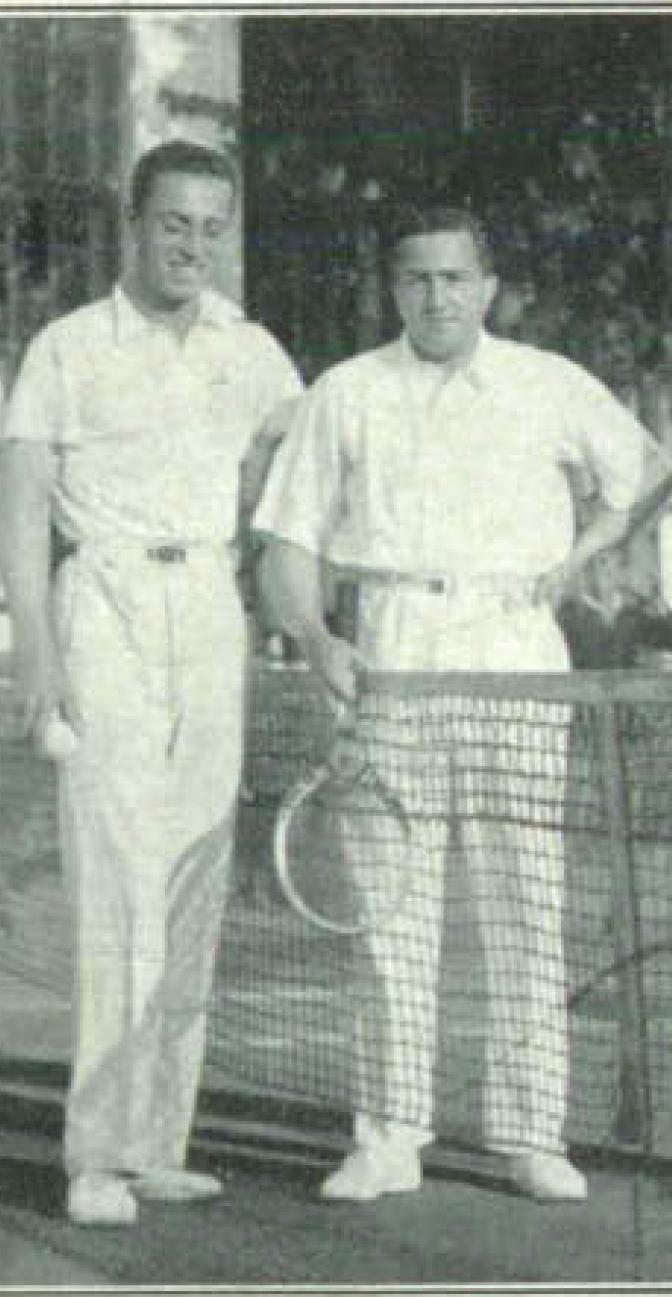
Béla von Kehrling and Imre Zichy playing in Budapest, Hungary, in 1914.

Player	W-L (Total)	W-L (Singles)	W-L (Doubles)	Ties	Debut
András Ádám-Stolpa	20–19	15–14	5–5	16	1948
József Asbóth	24–17	18–12	6–5	16	1938
Pál Aschner	0–2	0–0	0–2	2	1929
Attila Balázs	16–10	10–8	6–2	12	2009
György Balázs	4–2	3–2	1–0	5	2004
Szabolcs Baranyi	15–11	12–8	3–3	11	1969
Kornél Bardóczky	29–20	17–13	12–7	28	1997
János Benyik	3–13	3–13	0–0	9	1976
Zoltán Böröczky	1–1	0–1	1–0	2	1999
Gábor Borsos	1–3	1–3	0–0	3	2015
Ferenc Csépai	0–6	0–6	0–0	3	1986
Mihály Csikós	0–1	0–0	0–1	1	1939
György Dallos	2–6	2–4	0–2	4	1936
Kálmán Fehér	1–1	0–0	1–1	2	1948
Emil Ferenczy	0–3	0–0	0–3	3	1935
Viktor Filipenkó	1–3	0–3	1–0	3	2013
László Fonó	4–1	0–1	4–0	5	2003
Márton Fucsovics	25–14	18–8	7–6	18	2010
Emil Gábori (sometimes referred to as Emil Gabrowitz)	9–21	8–13	1–8	12	1931
Levente Gödry	5–4	0–0	5–4	9	2013
István Gulyás	34–27	27–17	7–10	22	1958
Antal Jancsó	1–5	1–2	0–3	4	1953
Gábor Jaross	0–1	0–1	0–0	1	2002
Zoltán Katona	4–6	4–5	0–1	6	1949
Aurél Kelemen	0–1	0–0	0–1	1	1925
Ádám Kellner	7–7	6–7	1–0	10	2005
Kálmán Kirchmäyer	0–1	0–0	0–1	1	1926
Gergely Kisgyörgy	23–14	16–8	7–6	24	1997
Sándor Kiss	4–8	1–5	3–3	6	1984
Sebő Kiss	15–10	9–10	6–0	16	2003
Ferenc Komáromy	1–2	1–2	0–0	2	1960
Attila Korpás	0–2	0–2	0–0	1	1965
Gábor Köves	10–6	0–0	10–6	16	1988
József Krocskó	9–11	9–11	0–0	10	1993
Zoltán Kuharszky	1–1	1–1	0–0	1	1980
András Lányi	12–13	6–10	6–3	12	1987
Dénes Lukács	2–3	2–3	0–0	4	2005
Róbert Machán	14–16	5–10	9–6	21	1969
Gergely Madarász	3–0	3–0	0–0	3	2014
László Markovits	10–15	1–7	9–8	18	1987
Norbert Mazány	1–1	1–1	0–0	1	1998
Péter Nagy	3–3	3–3	0–0	4	2015
Viktor Nagy	1–4	1–2	0–2	4	1991
Sándor Noszály	15–20	15–16	0–4	17	1989
Jenő Péteri	2–4	0–0	2–4	6	1924
Zsombor Piros	1–0	1–0	0–0	1	2018
Attila Sávolt	20–15	12–11	8–4	13	1996
István Sikorszki	0–2	0–0	0–2	2	1954
Elek Straub	2–2	2–2	0–0	2	1935
András Szikszay	12–14	5–6	7–8	15	1960
Péter Szőke	26–21	9–15	17–6	27	1967
Imre Takáts	7–18	7–17	0–1	12	1924
Balázs Taróczy	76–19	50–12	26–7	33	1973
Zsolt Tatár	0–1	0–1	0–0	1	2002
Dezső Vad	0–1	0–0	0–1	1	1953
Róbert Varga	4–0	0–0	4–0	4	2008
Balázs Veress	1–2	1–1	0–1	2	1998
Béla von Kehrling	25–21	22–9	3–12	16	1924
Ferenc Zentai	1–3	1–3	0–0	2	1985
Imre Zichy	0–3	0–0	0–3	3	1933

== See also ==
- Lists of tennis players
- List of Hungarians
