= Hungarian Tennis Championships =

Tournament information
- Founded: 1894
- Location: Hungary
- Surface: Clay
- Draw: 32S/16D
- Prize money: US$10,000

The Hungarian Tennis Championships also known as the Hungarian National Championships or the Hungarian Closed Championships is a professional tennis tournament played on outdoor clay courts. It is currently part of the official Tennis Calendar of Hungary of the Hungarian Tennis Association and is a gentlemen's and ladies' event.

== History ==
It is the fourth oldest tennis tournament of the world, which is held annually since its establishment. The first championships entitled as the Hungary's Lawn Tennis Championships were arranged on June 16, 1894, in Balatonfüred by the Stefánia Yacht Club. It was a coeducated tournament thus the first "men"'s singles trophy was awarded to Austrian countess Paulina von Pálffy. The next year the women's roster was distinguished and the men's, women's doubles and in 1909 the mixed doubles were added. In 1899 the tournament moved to Budapest and was organized by the Budapest Lawn Tennis Club. In 1903 the first unofficial international competition was held and subsequently became a standalone championship. In 1907 the Hungarian Lawn Tennis Association was formed as a subsidiary of the Hungarian Athletics Club thus the latter's name was included as the Annual HAC Tennis Championships (later the governing body was shortened to Hungarian Tennis Association). The hard court came into use when the National Indoors Championships were distinguished in 1927 (fedett pályás ob). The same year red clay was introduced as a new surface beside the already existing grass courts. Traditionally the winner of the outdoors championships is considered the Hungarian (National) champion. In the beginning the tournament accepted foreign entries but after 1924 the Hungarian International Championships served as a diverse event while only Hungarian players could possibly go for the national title. After World War II the international branch went defunct and only the nationals were held. Thus this tournament did and does not qualify as an open on ATP standards and no points are awarded for the results. The location of the event is determined each year, which allows several clubs and cities to host it outside the capital Budapest including Pécs, Szeged and Hódmezővásárhely. The date also varies to fit the schedule of other events but to be suitable for open air playing thus it takes place between May and end of September.

== Finals ==
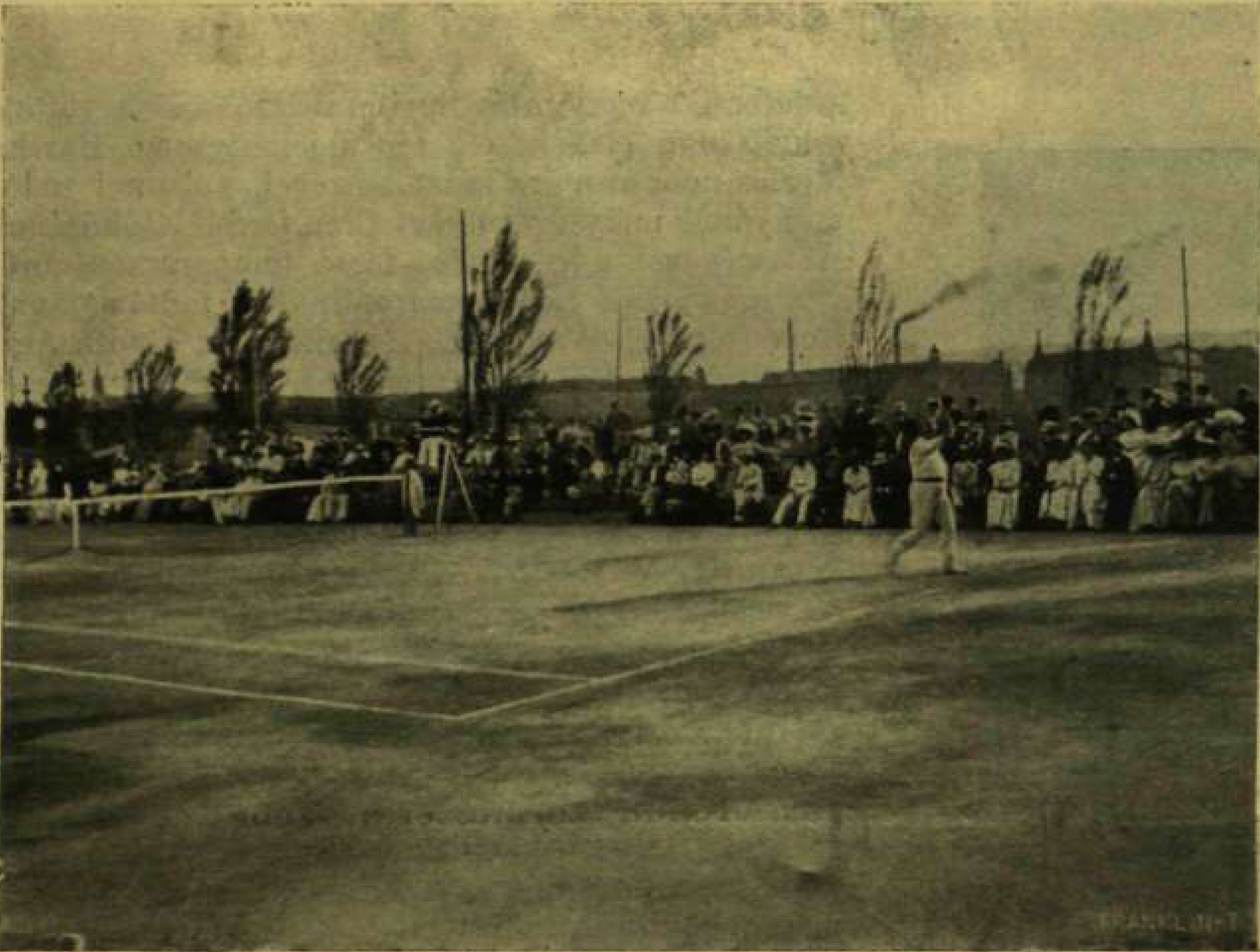
Margitsziget Lawn Tennis Club, frequent host of the event in the early years

=== Men's singles ===
(Incomplete roll)

National Championships
Year	Champion	Runner-up	Score
1894	(Austria-Hungary) Paulina von Pálffy^{[a]}	(Hungary) Károly Demény	6-4, 11-9
1895	(Hungary) Károly Demény		
1896	(Hungary) Tibor Dániel		
1897	(Hungary) Tibor Dániel		
1898	(Hungary) Tibor Dániel	(Hungary) Imre Szentgyörgyi	
1899	(United Kingdom) Arthur Yolland		
1900	(United Kingdom) Arthur Yolland		
1901	(Hungary) Ödön Schmid	^{[b]}	
1902	(Hungary) Pál Segner	(Hungary) Ödön Schmid	
1903	(Hungary) Pál Segner	(Hungary) Ödön Schmid	
1904	(Hungary) Ede Tóth		
1905	(Hungary) Pál Segner		
1906	(Hungary) Pál Segner		
1907	(Hungary) Jenő Zsigmondy	(Hungary) Dezső Lauber	
1908	(Hungary) Ede Tóth	(Hungary) Pál Segner	
1909	(Hungary) Pál Segner		
1910	(Hungary) Jenő Zsigmondy		
1911	(Hungary) Jenő Zsigmondy		
1912	(Hungary) Béla Von Kehrling		
1913	(Hungary) Béla Von Kehrling	(Hungary) Jenő Zsigmondy	3–6, 6–4, 6–1
1914	(Hungary) Béla Von Kehrling	(Hungary) Jenő Zsigmondy	8–6, 6–2, 6–2
1915–1919	Not Held^{[c]}		
1920	(Hungary) Béla Von Kehrling		
1921	(Hungary) Béla Von Kehrling		
1922	(Hungary) Béla Von Kehrling		
1923	(Hungary) Béla Von Kehrling		
1924	(Hungary) Béla Von Kehrling		
1925	(Hungary) Béla Von Kehrling		
1926	(Hungary) Béla Von Kehrling		
1927	(Hungary) Béla Von Kehrling		
1928	(Hungary) Béla Von Kehrling		
1929^{[f]}	(Hungary) Béla Von Kehrling	(Czechoslovakia) Roderich Menzel	7–5, 4–6, 6–3 ret.
1930	(Hungary) Béla Von Kehrling	(Hungary) Pál Aschner	6–1, 6–2, w/o
1931	(Hungary) Béla Von Kehrling	(Hungary) Lehel Bánó	6–2, 6–4, 3–6, 6–1
1932	(Hungary) Béla Von Kehrling		
1933	(Hungary) Emil Gabrovitz	(Hungary) Kálmán Kiss	6–3, 6–3, 7–5
1934	(Hungary) Emil Gabrovitz		
1935	(Hungary) Ottó Szigeti	(Hungary) Emil Gabrovitz	6–4, 9–7, 6–0
1936	(Hungary) Ottó Szigeti	(Hungary) Zsigmond Balázs	6–4, 6–3, 6–3
1937	(Hungary) Emil Gábori	(Hungary) György Dallos	
1938	(Hungary) Ottó Szigeti	(Hungary) Emil Gábori	3–6, 9–7, 4–6, 6–3, 6–3
1939	(Hungary) József Asbóth		
1940	(Hungary) József Asbóth		
1941	Not Held		
1942	(Hungary) József Asbóth	(Hungary) Ottó Szigeti	6–0, 6–1. 6–3
1943	(Hungary) József Asbóth	(Hungary) Ottó Szigeti	2–6, 8–6, 5–7, 1–6
1944	(Hungary) József Asbóth	(Hungary) Ottó Szigeti	6–3, 6–0, 6–4
1945	(Hungary) József Asbóth	(Hungary) Ottó Szigeti	6–2, 6–1, 6–1
1946	(Hungary) József Asbóth	(Hungary) Ottó Szigeti	6–0, 6–2, 3–6, 6–0
1947	(Hungary) Ottó Szigeti		
1948	(Hungary) András Ádám-Stolpa		
1949	(Hungary) József Asbóth		
1950	(Hungary) József Asbóth		
1951	(Hungary) Zoltán Katona		
1952	(Hungary) József Asbóth		
1953	(Hungary) József Asbóth		
1954	(Hungary) István Gulyás		
1955	(Hungary) József Asbóth		
1956	(Hungary) József Asbóth		
1957	(Hungary) István Gulyás		
1958	(Hungary) István Gulyás		
1959	(Hungary) István Gulyás		
1960	(Hungary) István Gulyás		
1961	(Hungary) István Gulyás		
1962	(Hungary) István Gulyás		
1963	(Hungary) István Gulyás		
1964	(Hungary) István Gulyás		
1965	(Hungary) István Gulyás		
1966	(Hungary) István Gulyás		
1967	(Hungary) István Gulyás		
1968	(Hungary) István Gulyás	(Hungary) Szabolcs Baranyi	5–7, 6–3, 6–3, 6–3
1969	(Hungary) Szabolcs Baranyi	(Hungary) István Gulyás	
1970	(Hungary) István Gulyás		
1971	(Hungary) István Gulyás		
1972	(Hungary) Szabolcs Baranyi		
1973	(Hungary) Balázs Taróczy		
1974	(Hungary) Balázs Taróczy		
1975	(Hungary) Balázs Taróczy		
1976	(Hungary) Balázs Taróczy		
1977	(Hungary) János Benyik		
1978	(Hungary) Balázs Taróczy		
1979	(Hungary) Balázs Taróczy		
1980	(Hungary) János Benyik		
1981	(Hungary) Róbert Machán		
1982	(Hungary) Géza Varga		
1983	(Hungary) Sándor Kiss		
1984	(Hungary) Sándor Kiss		
1985	(Hungary) Ferenc Zentai		
1986	(Hungary) László Markovits		
1987	(Hungary) András Lányi		
1988	(Hungary) Sándor Noszály		
1989	(Hungary) Sándor Noszály	(Hungary) László Markovits	6–4, 1–6, 7–6, 6–2
1990	(Hungary) László Markovits	(Hungary) József Krocskó	6–3, 1–6, 7–6, 6–3
1991	(Hungary) Sándor Noszály		
1992	(Hungary) József Krocskó		
1993	(Hungary) József Krocskó		
1994	(Hungary) Viktor Nagy		
1995	(Hungary) Zoltán Nagy		
1996	(Hungary) Levente Barátosi		
1997	(Hungary) Iván Lukács		
1998	(Hungary) Attila Sávolt		
1999	(Hungary) Attila Sávolt	(Hungary) Gergely Kisgyörgy	6–2, 6–4
2000	(Hungary) Zoltán Nagy	(Hungary) Balázs Veress	7–6, 3–6, 6–2
2001	(Hungary) Kornél Bardóczky	(Hungary) Gergely Kisgyörgy	6–4, 4–6, 6–3
2002	(Hungary) Kornél Bardóczky	(Hungary) Zoltán Nagy	6–1, 3–6, 6–0
2003	(Hungary) Sándor Noszály (WC)	(Hungary) Gábor Jaross	7–6, 4–6, 6–2
2004	(Hungary) György Balázs	(Hungary) Sebő Kiss	
2005	(Hungary) Norbert Pákai	(Hungary) Tamás Krafcsik	6–1, 6–0
2006	(Hungary) Kornél Bardóczky	(Hungary)	
2007	(Hungary) Ádám Kellner	(Hungary) Dénes Lukács	5–7, 6–3, 6–2
2008	(Hungary) Attila Balázs	(Hungary) Sebő Kiss	
2009	(Hungary) Attila Balázs	(Hungary) György Balázs	
2010	(Hungary) Attila Balázs	(Hungary) György Balázs	7–6, 6–1
2011	(Hungary) Attila Balázs	(Hungary) Péter Nagy	6–3, 6–0, 6–4
2012	(Hungary) Attila Balázs	(Hungary) Kornél Bardóczky	6–3, 6–3, 6–4
2013	(Hungary) Attila Balázs	(Hungary) Viktor Filipenkó	7–6, 5–7, 6–2, 6–2
2014	(Hungary) Péter Nagy	(Hungary) Attila Balázs	6–7, 7–6, 7–6, 6–3
2015	(Hungary) Péter Nagy	(Hungary) Csongor Tóth	6–1, 6–1, 6–1
2016	(Hungary) Attila Balázs	(Hungary) Máté Valkusz	7–6(4), 6–2, 6–2
2017	(Hungary) Zsombor Piros	(Hungary) Máté Valkusz	6–2, 7–6(5), 5–7, 6–2
2018	(Hungary) Máté Valkusz	(Hungary) Péter Nagy	6–3, 6–1
2019	(Hungary) Fábián Marozsán	(Hungary) Péter Makk	7–6(5), 6–4

=== Men's doubles ===
Doubles Championships
Year	Champion	Runner-up	Score
1909	(Hungary) Pál Segner / (Hungary) Jenő Zsigmondy		
1910	(Hungary) Pál Segner / (Hungary) Jenő Zsigmondy		
1911	(Hungary) Pál Segner / (Hungary) Jenő Zsigmondy		
1912	(Hungary) Pál Segner / (Hungary) Jenő Zsigmondy		
1913	(Hungary) Béla von Kehrling / (Hungary) Jenő Zsigmondy	(Hungary) Ödön Schmid (Hungary) Leó von Baráth	6–3, 3–6, 6–3
1914	(Hungary) Béla von Kehrling / (Hungary) Aurél von Kelemen		
1920	(Hungary) Béla von Kehrling / (Hungary) Aurél von Kelemen		
1921	(Hungary) Béla von Kehrling / (Hungary) Aurél von Kelemen		
1922	(Hungary) Béla von Kehrling / (Hungary) Aurél von Kelemen		
1923	(Hungary) Béla von Kehrling / (Hungary) Aurél von Kelemen		
1924	(Czechoslovakia) František Soyka / (Czechoslovakia) Ernst Gottlieb		
1925	(Russia) Sergei Rodzianko / (Weimar Republic) Kurt Bergmann		
1926	(Hungary) Béla von Kehrling / (Hungary) Jenő Péteri		
1927	(Hungary) Béla von Kehrling / (Hungary) Jenő Péteri		
1928	(Hungary) Béla von Kehrling / (Hungary) Jenő Péteri		
1929	(Czechoslovakia) Friedrich Rohrer / (Czechoslovakia) Roderich Menzel		
1930	(Hungary) Béla von Kehrling / (Hungary) Emil Gabrovitz		
1931	(Hungary) Imre Zichy / (Hungary) Emil Gabrowitz		
1932	(Hungary) Imre Zichy / (Hungary) Béla von Kehrling		
1933	(Hungary) Béla von Kehrling / (Hungary) György Drjetomszky		
1934	(Hungary) Imre Zichy / (Hungary) György Drjetomszky		
1935	(Hungary) Emil Ferenczy / (Hungary) Tibor Friedrich		
1936	(Hungary) Ottó Szigeti / (Hungary) Béla Pető		
1937	(Hungary) Emil Gabrowitz / (Hungary) György Drjetomszky		
1938	(Hungary) Ottó Szigeti / (Hungary) Kálmán Aschner		
1939	(Hungary) József Asbóth / (Hungary) Mihály Csikós		
1940	(Hungary) József Asbóth / (Hungary) Lehel Bánó		
1942	(Hungary) József Asbóth / (Hungary) Sándor Mayer		
1943	(Hungary) József Asbóth / (Hungary) Sándor Mayer		
1944	(Hungary) András Ádám-Stolpa / (Hungary) Kálmán Fehér		
1945	(Hungary) Ottó Szigeti / (Hungary) Emil Gabrowitz		
1946	(Hungary) József Asbóth / (Hungary) Ottó Szigeti		
1947	(Hungary) Tibor Tornyai / (Hungary) Kálmán Fehér		
1948	(Hungary) András Ádám-Stolpa / (Hungary) Kálmán Fehér		
1949	(Hungary) József Asbóth / (Hungary) Kálmán Fehér		
1950	(Hungary) András Ádám-Stolpa / (Hungary) Zoltán Katona		
1951	(Hungary) András Ádám-Stolpa / (Hungary) Frigyes Bujtor		
1952	(Hungary) József Asbóth / (Hungary) Kálmán Fehér		
1953	(Hungary) József Asbóth / (Hungary) András Ádám-Stolpa		
1954	(Hungary) József Asbóth / (Hungary) György Birkás		
1955	(Hungary) István Sikorszky / (Hungary) Kálmán Fehér		
1956	(Hungary) József Asbóth / (Hungary) Antal Jancsó		
1957	(Hungary) István Gulyás / (Hungary) Zoltán Katona		
1958	(Hungary) István Gulyás / (Hungary) Zoltán Katona		
1959	(Hungary) István Gulyás / (Hungary) Zoltán Katona		
1960	(Hungary) András Szikszay / (Hungary) Ferenc Zentai		
1961	(Hungary) András Ádám-Stolpa / (Hungary) Zoltán Katona		
1962	(Hungary) István Gulyás / (Hungary) András Szikszay		
1963	(Hungary) István Gulyás / (Hungary) András Szikszay		
1964	(Hungary) István Gulyás / (Hungary) András Szikszay		
1965	(Hungary) István Gulyás / (Hungary) András Szikszay		
1966	(Hungary) István Gulyás / (Hungary) András Szikszay		
1967	(Hungary) István Gulyás / (Hungary) András Szikszay		

| |}

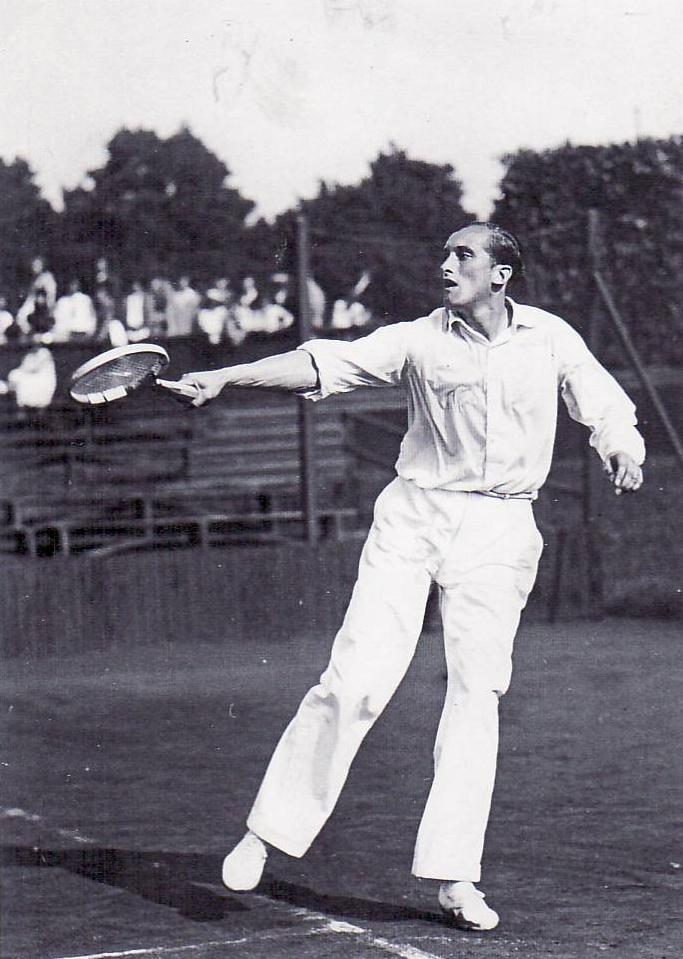
two times champion Roderich Menzel

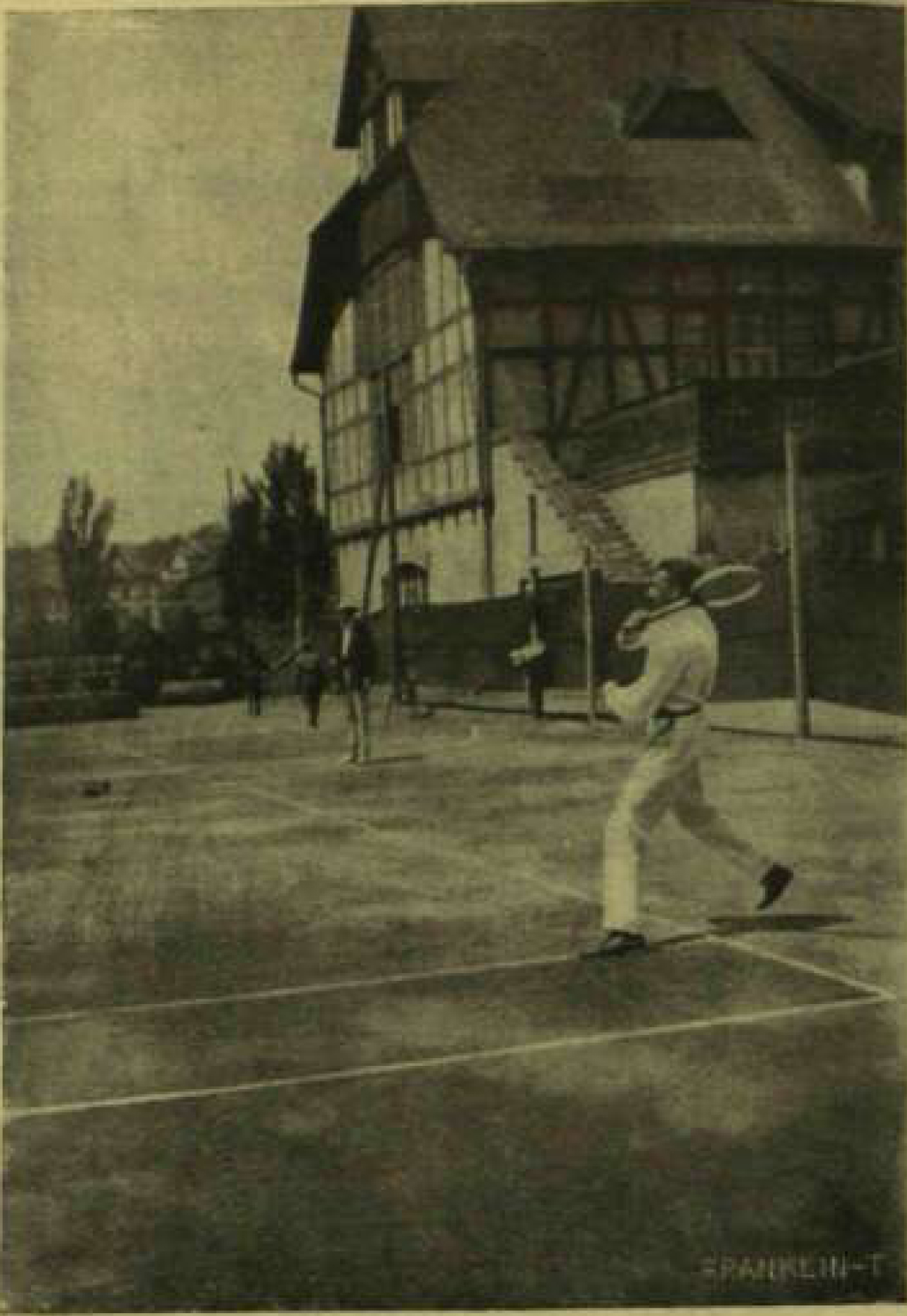
two times champion Ede Tóth

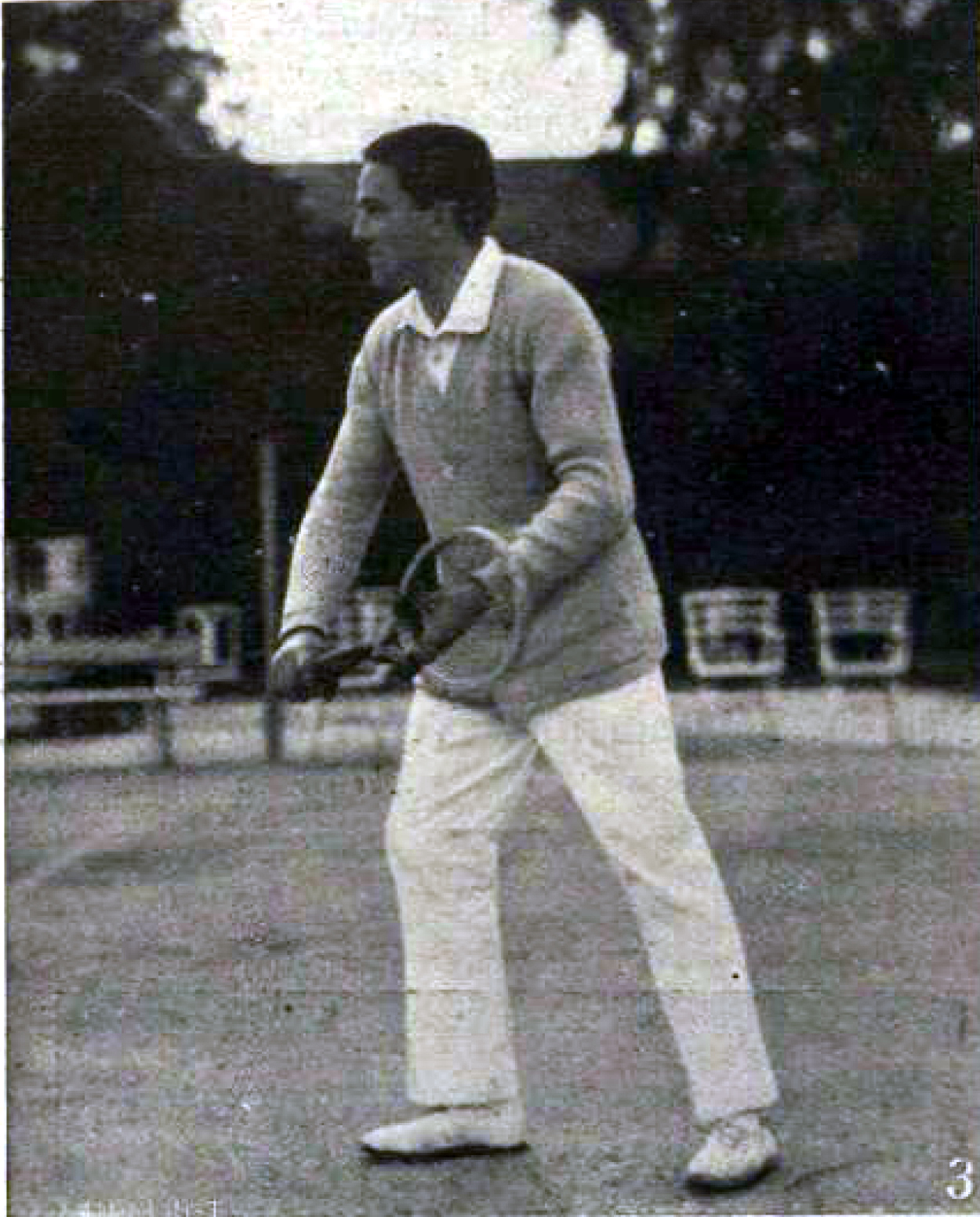
16 times champion Béla von Kehrling

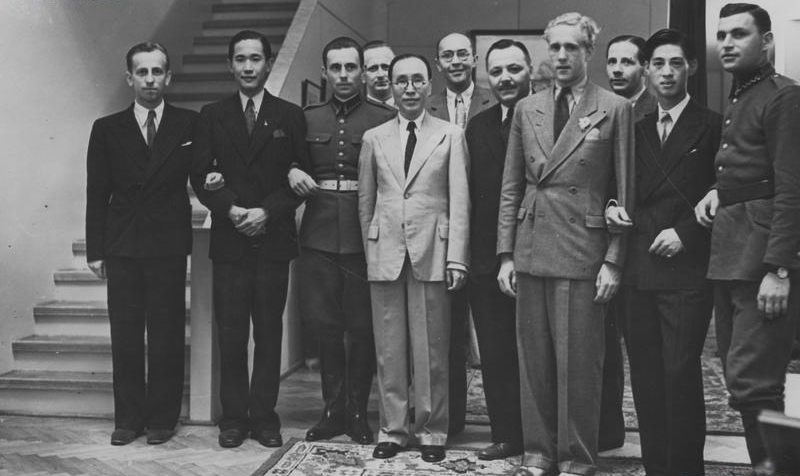
(from left) International finalists Ignacy Tłoczyński and Kho Sin-Kie

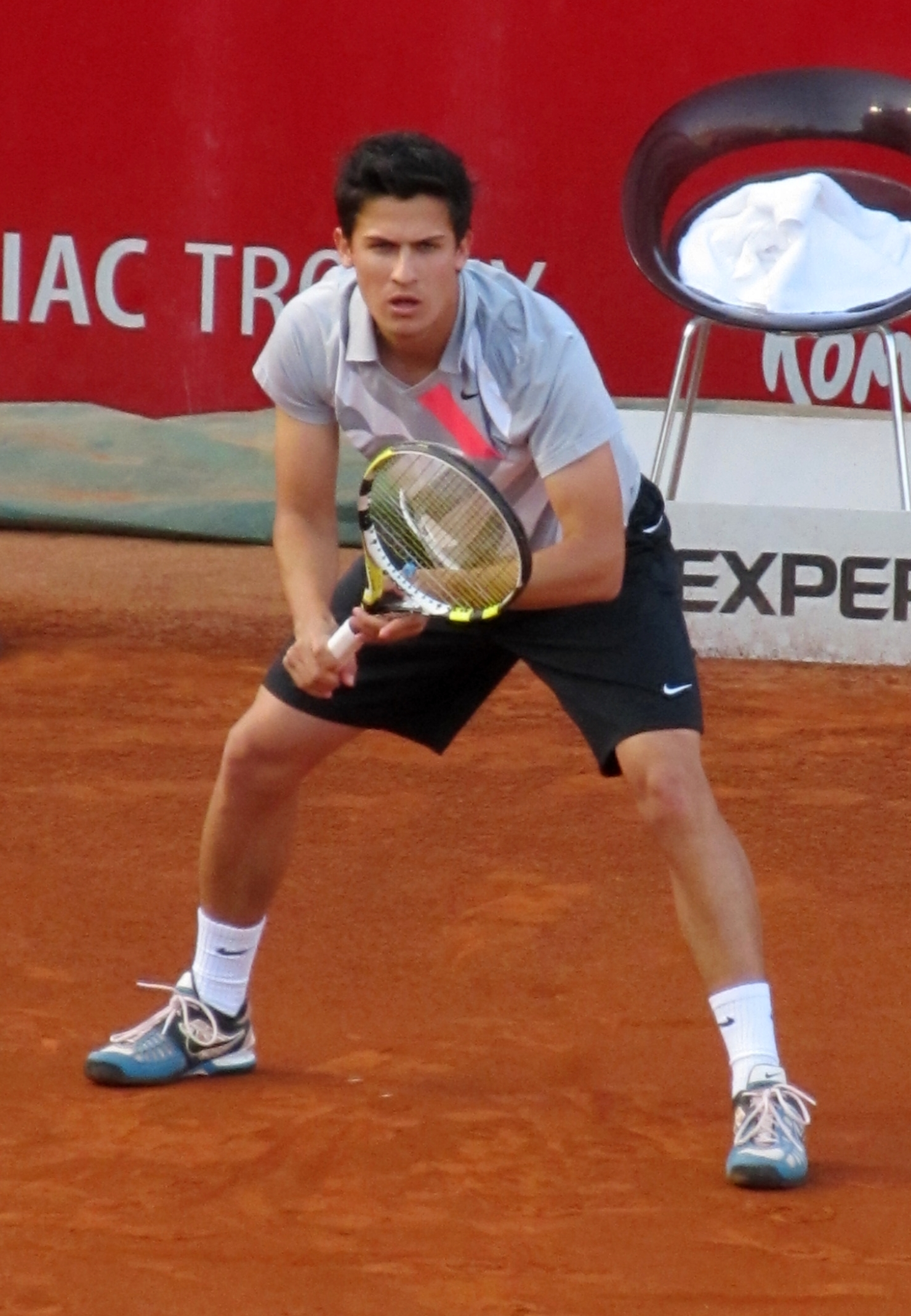
Seven-times champion Attila Balázs

== Statistics ==
Hungarian Champions

16 times champion	Béla von Kehrling
15 times champion	István Gulyás
13 times champions	József Asbóth
7 times champion	Attila Balázs
6 times champion	Balázs Taróczy
5 times champion	Pál Segner
4 times champions	Sándor Noszály, Ottó SZigeti
3 times champions	Jenő Zsigmondi, Tibor Dániel, Kornél Bardóczky, Emil Gabrowitz (-Gábori)
2 times champions	Arthur Yolland, János Benyik, Sándor Kiss, József Krocskó, László Markovits, Zoltán Nagy, Péter Nagy, Attila Sávolt, Ede Tóth
1-time champions	Paulina Pálffy, András Ádám-Stolpa, György Balázs, Szabolcs Baranyi, Levente Barátosi, Károly Demény, Zoltán Katona; Ádám Kellner, András Lányi, Iván Lukács, Róbert Machán, Viktor Nagy, Norbert Pákai, Ödön Schmid, Géza Varga, Ferenc Zentai jr., Zsombor Piros

- Eternal Champions (honorary title): Béla von Kehrling, József Asbóth, István Gulyás
- Longest winning streaks: Béla von Kehrling (1912–1914 and 1920–1932, 16yrs^{c} ), István Gulyás (1957–1968, 12yrs)
- Triple consecutive title holders:Tibor Daniel (1896–1898), Béla von Kehrling (1912–1914), József Asbóth (1939–40,1942), István Gulyás (1957–1959), Balázs Taróczy (1973–1975), Attila Balázs (2008–2013)

== See also ==
- Budapest International Championships (1903–1975) open international tournament.
- Hungarian International Championships (1903–1975) open international tournament.
- Hungary Davis Cup team

== Notes ==
- ^{a} The tournament was won by Countess Paulina von Pálffy since the first tournament was coeducated.
- ^{b} subsequent governor of Hungary Miklós Horthy also participated in the event
- ^{c} The tournament was not held from 1915 to 1918 because of World War I.
- ^{d} The tournament was not held in 1941 because of lack of tennis balls.
- ^{e} Note that Emil Gabrovitz and Emil Gábori is the same person. He won 3 singles titles altogether under the two different names.
- ^{f} Merged with the international championship. The winner is considered the national champion.
