= Hungary Davis Cup team =

Davis Cup team representing Hungary

Hungary
- Captain: Zoltán Nagy
- Nations Ranking: 15 ▲ (21 September 2026)
- Colors: Red and white
- First year: 1924
- Years played: 91
- Ties played (W–L): 183 (90–93)
- Years in World Group: 10 (2–11)
- Best finish: 1st round (1994, 1996, 2018)
- Most total wins: Balázs Taróczy (76–19)
- Most singles wins: Balázs Taróczy (50–12)
- Most doubles wins: Balázs Taróczy (26–7)
- Best doubles team: Balázs Taróczy / Péter Szőke (17–2)
- Most ties played: Balázs Taróczy (33)
- Most years played: Kornél Bardóczky; Márton Fucsovics (15)

The Hungary men's national tennis team represents Hungary in Davis Cup tennis competition and are governed by the Hungarian Tennis Association (Magyar Tenisz Szövetség).

== History ==
=== First decades in Davis Cup (1924–1967) ===
Hungary competed in its first Davis Cup in 1924 and was stuck in the first round for five years (not counting an automatic bye). They broke the curse with the first and convincing 5–0 win against Norway realized by Béla Von Kehrling in the major part. In 1929 they cruised to their first semifinal losing to Great Britain in a close 3–2 (two singles absolved by Von Kehrling) falling only in the fifth rubber. It took another 20 years to relive the success in 1949 (including the five-year vacancy period during the Second World War) this time losing to France in the semis. The core of the team was 1947 French Open champion József Asbóth. In 1956 Hungary was absent from the Cup because of the Hungarian Revolution of 1956. In 1966 a record attendance visited the Hungary-Great Britain quarterfinal in Budapest, where a crowd of 20,000 spectators supported the András Szikszay-István Gulyás Davis Cup team during the four-day tie. A tough weekend started on Saturday 14 May for the multiple champions Brits, who had three-time Major semifinalist Mike Sangster losing their first match in five sets to István Gulyás. They turned to 2–1 on the same day but on Sunday András Szikszay also defeated Sangster leaving the decision to the fifth final tie, which was postponed to Monday. In a four set match Gulyás started well taking the first one 18–16, but Roger Taylor finished in three easier sets. English team captain Headley Baxter remarked that although they won they hadn't been forced into such a tough fight for years. Just two weeks later Gulyás had his first and lone Grand Slam final in the French Open losing only to Tony Roche of Australia.

Members

- Béla Von Kehrling (46 matches 25/21 W/L)
- József Asbóth (41 matches 24/17 W/L)
- Elek Straub (4 matches, 2/2 W/L)
- (Hungary) Emil Ferenczy (3 matches 0/3 W/L)
- (Hungary) Imre Zichy (3 matches 0/3 W/L)
- (Budapest) Emil Gábori (30 matches 9/21 W/L)
- (Budapest) Pál Aschner (2 matches 0/2 W/L)
- (Hungary) Imre Takáts (25 matches 7/718 W/L)
- Kálmán Kirchmayer (8 matches 3/5 W/L)
- (Hungary) Jenő Péteri (6 matches 2/4 W/L)
- (Budapest) Aurél Kelemen (1 match 0/1 W/L)
- (Hungary) György Dallos (8 match 2/6 W/L)
- (Hungary) Zoltán Katona (10 match 4/6 W/L)
- (Hungary) Kálmán Fehér (2 match 1/1 W/L)
- (Hungary) András Ádám-Stolpa (39 match 20/19 W/L)
- (Hungary) Mihály Csikós (1 match 0/1 W/L)
- (Hungary) Dezső Vad (1 match 0/1 W/L)
- (Hungary) Antal Jancsó (6 match 1/5 W/L)
- István Gulyás (48 match 28/20 W/L)
- (Hungary) István Sikorszki (2 match 0/2 W/L)
- (Budapest) Ferenc Komáromy (3 match 1/2 W/L)
- (Hungary) András Szikszay (25 match 12/13 W/L)
- (Budapest) Attila Korpás (2 match 0/2 W/L)
- (Budapest) Péter Szőke (1 match 0/1 W/L)

=== From open-era tennis to formation of World Group (1968–1980) ===
22 years after the last attempt in 1971 the third semifinal challenge was left unexploited for the team as the Federal Republic of Germany took the first three matches in two 5-sets and a 4-sets contests. The tie was saved by Szabolcs Baranyi (the present day captain) in the fifth match evading total defeat. It was also the last Davis Cup for veteran player István Gulyás who fought in 61 matches for 14 years. Four years later Hungary repeatedly advanced to the semis by winning three consecutive rounds (Hungary had to get out from the preliminary round) but were stopped by Czechoslovakia.

The breakthrough came in the next year when Hungary had a chance to advance into the Inter-Zonal Zone in the Europe Zone B Final. The Péter Szőke, János Benyik (1995 captain) and Balázs Taróczy (the only Hungarian winner in the tie) trio had to battle comrade socialist country Soviet Union. Though the soviets won the qualifier 4–1 they stepped back from the Inter-Zonal Zone first round versus Chile. Hungary had to wait two more years to get a second try in the final of the 1978 Europe Zone A against 1975 one-time champions Sweden. Three times Wimbledon and French Open champion and former World number one Björn Borg backed up the Swedes. The Taróczy-Szőke duo won the doubles but the rest of the matches were lost.

Members

- (Budapest) Balázs Taróczy (49 matches 37/12 W/L)
- (Budapest) Péter Szőke (37 matches 19/18 W/L)
- (Budapest) Szabolcs Baranyi (26 matches 15/11 W/L)
- (Budapest) Róbert Machán (14 matches 9/5 W/L)
- István Gulyás (13 matches 6/7 W/L)
- (Budapest) János Benyik (9 matches 2/7 W/L)
- (Budapest) Zoltán Kuharszky (2 matches 1/1 W/L)
- (Hungary) András Szikszay (1 matches 0/1 W/L)

=== Introduction of World Group and Hungary entering (1981–1996) ===
==== 1981–93 seasons ====
The era was dominated by the play of two-time GS doubles champion Balázs Taróczy (1973–'86) and Lányi-Markovits ('87–'93) and the introduction of the all-time youngest player Sándor Noszály. The team had four fruitless attempts to advance to the World Group (lost to New Zealand, Denmark and two times to Spain) and had to defend one Europe Group I – Relegation Play-off (def. Belgium). Due to the lack of tie breaks the Taróczy-Machán doubles hold the record for the Most Games In Rubber in the third one of the 1985 quarterfinal with Egypt. Though the Egyptians had won it the Hungarians made a comeback from 2–1 and turned to 3–2. After the induction of tie-break László Markovits set this record in singles as well in the quarterfinals of the 1992 Euro/African Group I. It was also a defeat in the 5-set opening match against Poland with the final set lasting 14–12 (the final set tie-break still hadn't been accepted). The outcome was 3–2 to Hungary.

==== 1993 season ====
Hungary
4
Margitsziget Tennis Stadium, Budapest, Hungary
24–26 September 1993
clay (outdoors)

Argentina
1

| | | | 1 | 2 | 3 | 4 | 5 |
|---|---|---|---|---|---|---|---|
| 1 | (Hungary) (Argentina) | Sándor Noszály; Guillermo Pérez Roldán | 6; 3 | 7; 5 | 6; 3 |
| 2 | (Hungary) (Argentina) | József Krocskó; Alberto Mancini | 7^{7} 6^{4} | 6; 3 | 6; 2 |
| 3 | (Hungary) (Argentina) | Nagy / Noszály; Albano / Frana | 6^{2} 7^{7} | 1; 6 | 1; 6 |
| 4 | (Hungary) (Argentina) | József Krocskó; Javier Frana | 6; 2 | 6; 4 | 4; 6 | 6; 3 |
| 5 | (Hungary) (Argentina) | Sándor Noszály; Alberto Mancini | 4; 6 | 7^{7} 6^{4} | 6; 3 |

From the beginning of the season the captain András Pintér was followed by Csepai Ferenc.

The Euro/African Group I first Round was organized by Hungary at the Vasas Sports Club in March. They had to overcome the tennis minority Finland. The three opposite players had 1 ATP point altogether in singles. Olli Rahnasto was a well-established doubles player, while his Finnish partner was unranked so were the Hungarian Lányi-Markovits duo. Matching the expectations Hungary won the draw with only one setback on the event that is Rahnasto defeating József Krocskó.

The next step was taking over Great Britain in the second round in Hungary. It was Lányi's last appearance in the Davis Cup. The Brits were composed of Jeremy Bates, Mark Petchey and Chris Wilkinson. The quartet of Krocskó/Noszály/Lányi-Markovits represented Hungary. All the Englishmen were higher ranked than the Hungarian best József Krocskó. Their doubles were better as well. It was a close win for Hungary finishing the tie in the decider 3 straight sets win of Noszály on Wilkinson.

The team reached had the opportunity to qualify for the World Group for the sixth time of their run. The only change in the team was the substitution of Markovits/Lányi doubles for Viktor Nagy partnering singles player Sándor Noszály. Markovits remained in reserve. The match was played in outside red court in the UTE Stadium in Budapest. The Argentines were well-known of Guillermo Pérez Roldán (defended Casablanca title in March vs. El Aynaoui on clay) and Javier Frana (champion of Movistar Open in February on clay and '92 Olimpic bronze medalist for doubles) both inside the top 50–100 (#63, #82, #72 dbl. respectively). They were complemented by former top 10 player Alberto Mancini (#112) and Pablo Albano (#99 dbl.), the latter being paired up for the doubles round with Frana (winners of ATP Bordeaux on clay 5 days earlier), who arrived in good shape .

The first match was easily won by Noszály in three sets. He was in good form as he'd almost won the Budapest. In the second duel Krocskó pushed the Hungarians to a 2–0 lead by a 3 set win over Mancini, who held himself well in the first until the tie break, while gradually collapsing for the third set allowing a double break for Krocskó. The hope remained for the South-Americans after the fast doubles win over Noszály/Nagy, who played together for the first time and was on significantly low doubles rank for of 468 for Noszály and 715 for Nagy. Challenger on 19 September. The two had 134 positions difference in the ATP list at the time. The Argentine captain Francisco Mastelli decided to pick Frana instead of Perez-Roldan because of an injury for the crucial fourth rubber. At 2–1 tie the Krocskó-Frana face off who had 95 ATP places between them resulted in a World Group qualifying point for Krocskó, which he converted thus pushing the team into the Group for the first time in the Hungarian tennis history. At the dead rubber last match Noszály crowned the triumph with a 2–1 set victory over Mancini, who was 85 world rank ahead. After the match Krocskó said on the decider:"I prepared profoundly on Frana, because we suspected the opponent change upon injury. I knew if I could return his serves there will be no problem. I wasn't afraid when the third set had gone, because I had the whole match under control". The Hungarian captain considered the qualification a huge virtuosity, which he'd never dreamed of.

Euro/African Group I – Quarterfinals; 26 Mar – 28 Mar 1993; Budapest, Hungary
3 | Hungary ▲ | 4
4 | Finland | 1

Euro/African Group I – Semifinals; 30 Apr – 02 May 1993; Budapest, Hungary
2 | Hungary ▲ | 3
Great Britain | 2

World Group – Qualifying Round – 1st Round; 24 Sep – 26 Sep 1993; Budapest, Hungary
1 | Hungary ▲ | 4
Argentina | 1

==== 1994 season ====
In its first year of being promoted to World Group the Hungarians had to play with France in Besançon. The French had Henri Leconte competing for singles, Olivier Delaître for doubles and Arnaud Boetsch for both. Markovits returned to partner with Viktor Nagy. The only match won by Krocskó against former top 5 Leconte (#49 that week) in three straight sets. All five matches were in straight sets.

The same result came to happen in the play off against Italy in September at the Római parti Tennis Academy, Budapest. It was József Krocskó for the second time who provided the only win in a two per three sets final match over Renzo Furlan, who was 38th on the ATP list. The team was relegated to Europe Group as a consequence.

World Group

Semifinal; 25 Mar – 27 Mar 1994
Besançon, France
2 | France | 4
3 | Hungary ▼ | 1

Final; 23 Sep – 25 Sep 1994
Budapest, Hungary
1 | Hungary ▼ | 1
Italy | 4

==== 1995–1996 Season ====
Hungary
3
Kisstadion, Budapest, Hungary
22–24 September 1995
clay (outdoors)

Australia
2

| | | | 1 | 2 | 3 | 4 | 5 |
|---|---|---|---|---|---|---|---|
| 1 | (Hungary) (Australia) | Sándor Noszály; Mark Philippoussis | 1; 6 | 2; 6 | 3; 6 |
| 2 | (Hungary) (Australia) | József Krocskó; Todd Woodbridge | 5; 7 | 6; 2 | 6; 3 | 6; 1 |
| 3 | (Hungary) (Australia) | Köves / Markovits; Woodbridge / Woodforde | 6; 1 | 7^{9} 6^{7} | 0; 6 | 3; 6 | 2; 6 |
| 4 | (Hungary) (Australia) | Sándor Noszály; Todd Woodbridge | 6^{4} 7^{7} | 6; 3 | 1; 6 | 6; 2 | 7; 5 |
| 5 | (Hungary) (Australia) | József Krocskó; Mark Philippoussis | 6; 4 | 6; 4 | 3; 6 | 6; 3 |

The team was at its rise under the leadership of team captain and coach János Benyik. With his help the team reached the highest level group of Davis Cup and achieved remarkable victories over notable teams.

In 1995 the team had only one match because of their previous relegation from World Group. In the Euro/African Group I 1st Round they passed through Portugal and get a way back to the elite. The match took place in the Vasas stadium in Budapest. The Portugal tennis didn't soared at the moment with none of the native players inside the top 100. Their highest ranked player didn't step on court this time (N. Marques) thus all the engageable players were around the top 200 (actually 2 and 4 places inside the top 200, while the reserve player was 9 spots behind the top 250). However, in doubles they were much better (Köves/Markovits-Couto/Cunha-Silva) and because of the Davis Cup match up rules the lowest ranked Hungarian player had to beat his highest and better Portugal counterpart (Krocskó-Cunha-Silva). Contrary to the expectations these two matches was won by Hungary and was completed by the third win at the fourth rubber by Sándor Noszály over João Cunha-Silva (the two frontmen). The group advanced again to the play-offs (called World Group – Qualifying 1st round).

The biggest accomplishment of this team was the qualification to the World Group in a Play-off tie against the Australian team, whose rank and seed weren't determined by the actual Davis Cup rules, can be described the best by their flawless performance in the play-offs (thus this marked the first time for them to ever falling out of the World Group) and by the total Davis Cup champion titles they'd got (26 final victories, more than any other nation). World number one doubles partners Mark Woodforde-Todd Woodbridge (whose singles rank were #39-#36 respectively) were accompanied by Patrick Rafter (#46), Mark Philippoussis (#84) and coach John Newcombe and Tony Roche to Hungary. They left out of the stack 1993 finalist member Richard Fromberg (who became active again after two years break) and Jason Stoltenberg due to his shoulder injury.

The most anticipated Hungarian player was Sándor Noszály who reached the semifinals of Bucharest Open – part of ATP International series – after defeating Albert Costa and Sergi Bruguera. He was also at his peak on the world rankings at the 95th position. He remembered ten years after as arriving tired to his first match because he had 5 days of rest after the aforementioned Romanian tournament. He was joined by József Krocskó (#192), who called himself a "Davis Cup specialist", a name referring to his better results when it came to represent his country. Finally the Köves/Márkovits duo was added to the roster.

Before the start of the tie it was revealed that the announced line-up for the Aussies changed when Newcombe left Rafter out of the active players list because the Hungarian clay court doesn't favored him as officially been explained. According to affiliates of the Australian delegation the reason behind the decision was the confrontation of Rafter and the coaches caused by the filthy speech and disrespectful behaviour he showed during a training where he also smashed his racquet. The Hungarian captain expressed his thoughts that the heavy ball would hopefully kill the serve-and-volley style of the opponents and now that Woodbridge jumped in as flagship of their team the third match would prove to be too much for him. He also added the opponents are vulnerable on the baseline game.

The Friday first match happened upon predictions by Philippoussis taking the rubber easily in 3 sets 106 minutes. The next match was a decisive one since the Hungarian didn't want to rely on the doubles match. Krocskó started well against Woodbridge taking the lead in the first set serving for a 5–2 40/15, he lost it together with the set to 7–5. He eventually won the match by winning the consecutive three sets allowing his opponent only 6 games 6–2, 6–3, 6–1. After the match Woodbridge blamed the unusual cold weather, while Krocskó highlighted his aggressive style. At the Saturday doubles action the Hungarian pair advanced to 2–0 within 82 minutes over the multiple Grand Slam champions but the latter team took big effort to turn the tide and grabbed the victory. The Hungarians admitted that they became tired in the middle of the match while the Woodies commented on their initial weak as a result of Woodforde's birthday party just before the beginning of the day. The Sunday schedule say the comeback of the Hungarian team from 2–1 to 2–3 as the three and half hour long rise and fall match of the two highest ranked players was won by Noszály despite Woodbridge having 3 break points at 3–3, which could have given him the chance to serve out the match. The confident play of Krocskó in the decider meant the end of Australia's permanent successes in the World Group and Hungary being promoted into it for the second time.

In the first round of the 1996 Davis Cup World Group they faced the Czech Republic the actual semifinalists of the year. Their opponents enlisted Daniel Vacek (#26), Petr Korda (#27) and Davis Cup debutant newcomer Jiří Novák (#40) giving the Hungarians no chance with a walloping 5–0 victory in Plzeň, Czech Republic.

They had to defend the World Group membership against up-and-coming Russia headed by Yevgeny Kafelnikov (#5). The Hungarian team had been saved by a second zero defeat thanks to Sávolt Attila the newest player of the team, who won the fifth match (vs. former top ten Andrei Chesnokov) shortened to two won sets due to irreversible 4–0 Russian lead. It also marked the retirement of Sándor Noszály who lost in his final match partnering Gábor Köves to Kafelnikov/Olhovski. Thus Hungary was eliminated from the Group for the second time.

World Group – Qualifying Round – 1st Round; 22 Sep – 24 Sep 1995; Budapest, Hungary
3 | Hungary ▲ | 3
4 | Australia | 2

World Group – 1st Round; 09 Feb – 11 Feb 1996; Plzeň, Czech Republic
2 | Czech Republic | 5
Hungary ▼ | 0

World Group – Qualifying Round – 1st Round; 20 Sep – 22 Sep 1996; Moscow, Russia
1 | Russia | 4
Hungary ▼ | 1

Members

- (Budapest) Balázs Taróczy (46 matches 39/7 W/L)
- (Budapest) Sándor Noszály (35 matches 15/20 W/L)
- (Budapest) András Lányi (25 matches, 12/13 W/L)
- (Budapest) László Markovits (24 matches 10/14 W/L)
- József Krocskó (18 matches 9/9 W/L)
- (Budapest) Róbert Machán (16 matches 5/11 W/L)
- (Budapest) Sándor Kiss (12 matches 8/4 W/L)
- (Budapest) Péter Szőke (9 matches 7/2 W/L)
- (Budapest) Gábor Köves (8 matches 3/5 W/L)
- (Budapest) Viktor Nagy (5 matches 1/4 W/L)
- (Budapest) János Benyik (7 matches 1/6 W/L)
- (Budapest) Attila Sávolt (2 matches 1/1 W/L)

=== Recent years (1997–2017) ===
Since then the Hungarians set several inhouse records such as Longest Tie Break (22 Points, 12/10 in favor of Hungary) in the fifth rubber of the 5–0 first round meeting with Monaco in 2001, the Longest Tie Duration (versus Luxembourg hallmarked by Gilles Müller) in a 2002 match-up, the Longest Winning Run in Ties between 2003–'04 (Estonia, Madagascar, Namibia, Lithuania), Longest Rubber Duration (4 Hours 31 Minutes during the 3–2 win over Bulgaria) in 2006 and the Most Decisive Victory in tie against Greece in 2008. Hungary was degraded to Group II in 1997 after being defeated by Ukraine 3–2. In 1999 they leveled up again but only for one year, in which they had two defeats to Andrei Pavel's Romania and Jarkko Nieminen's Finland. On 11 July 2010 Hungary avoided relegation against Macedonia from Europe/Africa Group II. In 2011 the team advanced to the play-off of Europe/Africa Group II after two successful ties against Cyprus and Belarus before failing to be promoted against Great Britain led by Andy Murray in singles and Fleming–Hutchins in doubles. In 2012 they were eliminated in the second round by Latvia who reversed the match after being 2–0 down with back to back victories by Ernest Gulbis and Andis Juška in doubles and in both singles in the second and third day. On 7 April 2013, Hungary was relegated to Europe Zone Group III, after they were defeated by Luxembourg. In 2017, Hungary returned to the world group by upsetting a strong Russian team 3–1, thus ending their 20-year absence in the top tier.

Members

- Kornél Bardóczky (45 matches 28/17 W/L)
- (Budapest) Gergely Kisgyörgy (37 matches 23/14 W/L)
- (Budapest) Attila Sávolt (33 matches 19/14 W/L)
- (Budapest) Sebő Kiss (23 matches 15/8 W/L)
- (Budapest) Gábor Köves (8 matches 7/1 W/L)
- (Budapest) Ádám Kellner (14 matches 7/7 W/L)
- (Budapest) Attila Balázs (7 matches 5/2 W/L)
- (Budapest) László Fonó (5 matches 4/1 W/L)
- (Budapest) György Balázs (5 matches 4/1 W/L)
- Dénes Lukács (5 matches 2/3 W/L)
- (Lviv Oblast) Róbert Varga (4 matches 4/0 W/L)
- (Budapest) Balázs Veress (3 matches 1/2 W/L)
- (Budapest) Zoltán Böröczky (2 matches 1/1 W/L)
- (Budapest) Norbert Mazány (2 matches 1/1 W/L)
- József Krocskó (2 matches 0/2 W/L)
- Márton Fucsovics (36 matches 24/12 W/L)
- (Budapest) Gábor Jaross (1 matches 0/1 W/L)
- (Budapest) Zsolt Tatár (1 matches, 0/1 W/L)
- (Budapest) László Markovits (1 matches 0/1 W/L)
- Norbert Pákai (0 matches 0/0 W/L)

== Results and fixtures ==
The following are lists of match results and scheduled matches for the current year.

Win Loss Fixture

=== 2025 ===
Qualifiers
First round

Canada
2
IGA Stadium, Montreal, Canada
1–2 February 2025
Hard (indoors)

Hungary
3

| | | | 1 | 2 | 3 |
|---|---|---|---|---|---|
| 1 | (Canada) (Hungary) | Alexis Galarneau; Fábián Marozsán | 3; 6 | 6; 3 | 3; 6 |
| 2 | (Canada) (Hungary) | Gabriel Diallo; Márton Fucsovics | 6; 3 | 2; 6 | 2; 6 |
| 3 | (Canada) (Hungary) | Liam Draxl / Vasek Pospisil; Peter Fajta / Máté Valkusz | 7^{7} 6^{2} | 6; 4 |
| 4 | (Canada) (Hungary) | Gabriel Diallo; Fábián Marozsán | 6; 1 | 6; 3 |
| 5 | (Canada) (Hungary) | Alexis Galarneau; Márton Fucsovics | 6^{8} 7^{10} | 4; 6 |

Qualifiers
Second round

Hungary
2
Főnix Aréna, Debrecen, Hungary
12–13 September 2025
Hard (indoors)

Austria
3

| | | | 1 | 2 | 3 |
|---|---|---|---|---|---|
| 1 | (Hungary) (Austria) | Fábián Marozsán; Jurij Rodionov | 2; 6 | 7^{7} 6^{5} | 5; 7 |
| 2 | (Hungary) (Austria) | Márton Fucsovics; Lukas Neumayer | 3; 6 | 6; 3 | 6^{7} 7^{9} |
| 3 | (Hungary) (Austria) | Fábián Marozsán / Zsombor Piros; Alexander Erler / Lucas Miedler | 7^{7} 6^{4} | 7^{7} 6^{2} |
| 4 | (Hungary) (Austria) | Zsombor Piros; Lukas Neumayer | 7; 5 | 7^{8} 6^{6} |
| 5 | (Hungary) (Austria) | Márton Fucsovics; Jurij Rodionov | 2; 6 | 1; 6 |

=== 2026 ===
Qualifiers
First round

Hungary
0
Multifunkcionális Sportcsarnok, Tatabánya, Hungary
7–8 February 2026
Clay (indoors)

United States
4

| | | | 1 | 2 | 3 |
|---|---|---|---|---|---|---|
| 1 | (Hungary) (United States) | Zsombor Piros; Tommy Paul | 6^{3} 7^{7} | 3; 6 |
| 2 | (Hungary) (United States) | Fábián Marozsán; Ethan Quinn | 6; 3 | 3; 6 | 6^{11} 7^{13} |
| 3 | (Hungary) (United States) | Fábián Marozsán / Zsombor Piros; Christian Harrison / Austin Krajicek | 4; 6 | 6; 3 | 3; 6 |
| 4 | (Hungary) (United States) | Matyas Fuele; Emilio Nava | 2; 6 | 3; 6 |
| 5 | (Hungary) (United States) | Zsombor Piros; Ethan Quinn | | | | not played |

World Group I

Luxembourg
0
d'Coque
Luxembourg City, Luxembourg
18–19 September 2026
Hard (indoors)

Hungary
4

| | | | 1 | 2 | 3 |
|---|---|---|---|---|---|---|
| 1 | (Luxembourg) (Hungary) | Louis Van Herck; Fábián Marozsán | 4; 6 | 4; 6 |
| 2 | (Luxembourg) (Hungary) | Alex Knaff; Zsombor Piros | 4; 6 | 0; 6 |
| 3 | (Luxembourg) (Hungary) | Raphael Calzi / Alex Knaff; Matyas Fuele / Péter Makk | 1; 6 | 6^{3} 7^{7} |
| 4 | (Luxembourg) (Hungary) | Matiej Reiter; Péter Makk | 1; 6 | 2; 6 |
| 5 | (Luxembourg) (Hungary) | Louis Van Herck; Zsombor Piros | | | | not played |

== Players ==
=== Current team (2025) ===
- Fábián Marozsán (singles)
- Márton Fucsovics (singles)
- Máté Valkusz
- Peter Fajta (doubles)
- Adam Jilly (doubles)

=== Recent callups ===
- Zsombor Piros
- Matyas Fuele

== Statistics ==
Last updated: Hungary – Belgium; 7 March 2020

Record

- Total: 85–86 (49.7%)

Head-to-head record (1924–)

| DC team | Pld | W | L |
|---|---|---|---|
| Algeria | 2 | 0 | 2 |
| Armenia | 1 | 1 | 0 |
| Argentina | 2 | 1 | 1 |
| Australia | 1 | 1 | 0 |
| Austria | 2 | 2 | 0 |
| Belarus | 1 | 1 | 0 |
| Belgium | 14 | 6 | 8 |
| Bosnia and Herzegovina | 1 | 1 | 0 |
| Brazil *^{4} | 2 | 0 | 2 |
| Bulgaria | 5 | 4 | 1 |
| Chile | 1 | 0 | 1 |
| Cyprus | 1 | 1 | 0 |
| Czech Republic | 2 | 0 | 2 |
| Czechoslovakia | 2 | 1 | 1 |
| Denmark | 8 | 3 | 5 |
| Egypt | 6 | 5 | 1 |
| Estonia | 2 | 1 | 1 |
| Finland | 4 | 3 | 1 |
| France | 5 | 1 | 4 |
| Georgia | 2 | 1 | 1 |
| Germany | 4 | 1 | 3 |
| West Germany | 2 | 1 | 1 |
| Great Britain | 4 | 1 | 3 |
| Greece | 4 | 4 | 0 |
| Iran *^{6} | 0 | 0 | 0 |
| Ireland *^{5} | 5 | 4 | 1 |
| Israel *^{3} | 4 | 3 | 1 |
| Italy | 8 | 1 | 7 |
| Japan | 2 | 0 | 2 |
| Latvia | 1 | 0 | 1 |
| Liechtenstein | 1 | 1 | 0 |
| Lithuania | 1 | 1 | 0 |
| Luxembourg | 4 | 2 | 2 |
| Madagascar | 1 | 1 | 0 |
| North Macedonia | 1 | 1 | 0 |
| Moldova | 3 | 2 | 1 |
| Monaco | 5 | 4 | 1 |
| Morocco | 2 | 2 | 0 |
| Namibia | 1 | 1 | 0 |
| Netherlands | 4 | 2 | 2 |
| New Zealand *^{1} | 2 | 1 | 1 |
| Nigeria | 2 | 1 | 1 |
| Norway *^{2} | 5 | 5 | 0 |
| Poland | 4 | 2 | 2 |
| Portugal | 3 | 1 | 2 |
| Romania | 2 | 1 | 1 |
| Russia | 2 | 1 | 1 |
| Serbia and Montenegro | 1 | 0 | 1 |
| Slovakia | 2 | 1 | 1 |
| Slovenia | 1 | 1 | 0 |
| South Africa | 1 | 0 | 1 |
| Soviet Union | 5 | 0 | 5 |
| Spain | 3 | 0 | 3 |
| Sweden | 5 | 1 | 4 |
| Switzerland | 3 | 1 | 2 |
| Ukraine | 3 | 1 | 2 |
| Yugoslavia | 4 | 1 | 3 |
| Zimbabwe | 2 | 2 | 0 |
| Total (58) | 171 | 85 | 86 |

Record against continents

| Africa | Asia | Europe | North America | Oceania | South America |
|---|---|---|---|---|---|
| Algeria; Egypt; Madagascar; Morocco; Namibia; Nigeria; South Africa; Zimbabwe | Iran; Japan | Armenia; Austria; Belarus; Belgium; Bosnia and Herzegovina; Bulgaria; Cyprus; Czech Republic; Czechoslovakia; Denmark; Estonia; Finland; France; Georgia; Germany; West Germany; Great Britain; Greece; Ireland; Israel; Italy; Latvia; Liechtenstein; Lithuania; Luxembourg; North Macedonia; Moldova; Monaco; Netherlands; Norway; Poland; Portugal; Romania; Russia; Serbia and Montenegro; Slovakia; Slovenia; Soviet Union; Spain; Sweden; Switzerland; Ukraine; Yugoslavia | | Australia; New Zealand | Argentina; Brazil; Chile |
| Record: 11–5 (68.8%) | Record: 0–2 (0.0%) | Record: 71–74 (48.9%) | Record: 0–0 | Record: 2–1 (66.7%) | Record: 1–4 (20.0%) |

Record by decade

- 1924–1929: 4–6 (40.0%)
- 1930–1939: 3–10 (23.1%)
- 1940–1949: 4–2 (66.7%)
- 1950–1959: 2–7 (22.2%)
- 1960–1969: 6–10 (37.5%)
- 1970–1979: 12–10 (54.5%)
- 1980–1989: 14–10 (58.3%)
- 1990–1999: 12–10 (54.5%)
- 2000–2009: 13–12 (52.0%)
- 2010–2019: 14–9 (60.9%)
- 2020–2029: 1–0 (100.0%)

Note:

- ^{1} On May of 1938 Hungary advanced to the quarterfinals against New Zealand by walkover.
- ^{2} On April of 1950 Norway advanced to the second round against Hungary by walkover.
- ^{3} On May of 1952 Hungary advanced to the second round against Israel by walkover.
- ^{4} On April of 1953 Hungary advanced to the second round against Brazil by walkover.
- ^{5} On April of 1957 Hungary advanced to the second round against Ireland by walkover.
- ^{6} On May of 1986 Hungary advanced to the quarterfinals against Iran by walkover.

== See also ==
- Davis Cup
- Hungary Billie Jean King Cup team
- Hungary at the Hopman Cup
