= Krešimir Ritz =

Croatian tennis player

- Country (sports): Croatia
- Born: 28 June 1973 (age 51); Zagreb, Yugoslavia
- Plays: Right-handed
- Prize money: $33,156

Singles
- Highest ranking: No. 811 (23 Aug 1999)

Doubles
- Career record: 0–2
- Highest ranking: No. 425 (8 Dec 1997)

Krešimir Ritz (born 28 June 1973) is a Croatian former professional tennis player.

Born in Zagreb, Ritz played professionally from the age of 15 and competed mostly in ITF level tournaments during his career. He however twice featured in the doubles main draw at Umag, with Marcelo Manola in 1995 and Ivo Karlović in 1996. At the age of 41 in 2014 he became the oldest player on tour with an ATP ranking.

Ritz's mother Neda is a well known television journalist in Croatia.

== ITF Futures finals ==
=== Doubles: 18 (8–10) ===
Result	W–L	Date	Tournament	Surface	Partner	Opponents	Score
Win	1–0	Jul 1998	Croatia F3, Mali Lošinj	Clay	(Croatia) Goran Prpić	(Croatia) Bora Celiščak (Germany) Valentino Pest	6–0, 6–3
Win	2–0	Aug 1998	Croatia F6, Umag	Clay	(Croatia) Josip Dumanić	(Australia) Tim Crichton (Australia) David McNamara	0–6, 7–6, 7–6
Loss	2–1	Feb 1999	Croatia F1, Zagreb	Hard	(Croatia) Ivan Cinkuš	(Israel) Jonathan Erlich (Israel) Nir Welgreen	2–6, 1–6
Win	3–1	Jun 2000	Slovenia F1, Portorož	Clay	(Spain) David Morente-Guerrero	(Slovakia) Frantisek Babej (Egypt) Karim Maamoun	6–2, 6–4
Loss	3–2	Oct 2000	Greece F6, Kos	Hard	(Croatia) Ivan Cinkuš	(Slovakia) Viktor Bruthans (Slovakia) Branislav Sekáč	6–3, 2–6, 3–6
Win	4–2	Nov 2000	Greece F7, Heraklion	Hard	(Croatia) Ivan Cinkuš	(Austria) Johannes Ager (Austria) Konstantin Gruber	3–6, 6–2, 6–3
Loss	4–3	Nov 2000	Cyprus F1, Nicosia	Clay	(Croatia) Ivan Cinkuš	(Slovenia) Andrej Kračman (Slovenia) Marko Tkalec	w/o
Loss	4–4	Jun 2002	Slovenia F1, Maribor	Clay	(Slovenia) Marko Tkalec	(Croatia) Ivan Cinkuš (Slovenia) Andrej Kračman	0–6, 3–6
Loss	4–5	Jun 2002	Slovenia F2, Maribor	Clay	(Slovenia) Marko Tkalec	(Croatia) Ivan Cinkuš (Slovenia) Andrej Kračman	6–7^{(5)}, 4–6
Win	5–5	Aug 2002	Austria F3, Kramsach	Clay	(Croatia) Ivan Cinkuš	(New Zealand) Rob Cheyne (Belgium) Stefan Wauters	6–4, 7–6^{(4)}
Win	6–5	Nov 2002	Mexico F18, Leon	Hard	(Republic of Ireland) Sean Cooper	(Mexico) Álvaro Domínguez (Mexico) Juan Manuel Elizondo	3–4, ret.
Win	7–5	Aug 2004	Croatia F4, Čakovec	Clay	(Croatia) Ivan Cerović	(Hungary) Sebő Kiss (Hungary) Zsolt Tatár	7–6^{(8)}, 6–4
Loss	7–6	Sep 2006	Croatia F6, Zagreb	Clay	(Slovenia) Rok Jarc	(Croatia) Luka Kukulić (Croatia) Joško Topić	2–6, 4–6
Loss	7–7	Jun 2007	Macedonia F2, Skopje	Clay	(France) Marc Auradou	(North Macedonia) Lazar Magdinčev (North Macedonia) Predrag Rusevski	3–6, 4–6
Win	8–7	Aug 2007	Croatia F6, Vinkovci	Clay	(Spain) Adolfo Gomez-Pinter	(Croatia) Goran Jukopila (Croatia) Albert Lončarić	6–4, 7–5
Loss	8–8	Aug 2010	Croatia F4, Čakovec	Clay	(Germany) Guido Troester	(Croatia) Marin Draganja (Croatia) Dino Marcan	2–6, 4–6
Loss	8–9	Apr 2012	Croatia F6, Vrsar	Clay	(Croatia) Joško Topić	(Austria) Lukas Jastraunig (Austria) Tristan-Samuel Weissborn	4–6, 6–4, [8–10]
Loss	8–10	May 2012	Bosnia & Herzegovina F1, Doboj	Clay	(Croatia) Joško Topić	(Slovenia) Miha Mlakar (Slovenia) Tomislav Ternar	4–6, 6–3, [8–10]
