= Norbert Mazány =

Hungarian tennis player

- Country (sports): Hungary
- Born: 19 February 1978 (age 47)
- Prize money: $13,291

Singles
- Career record: 1–1 (Davis Cup)
- Highest ranking: No. 455 (18 Sep 2000)

Doubles
- Highest ranking: No. 1010 (22 Feb 1999)

Norbert Mazány (born 19 February 1978) is a Hungarian former professional tennis player.

Mazány, a national indoor champion, attained a best singles world ranking of 455 and won one ITF Futures title. He represented Hungary in a Davis Cup tie in 1998, against Ireland in Budapest, which the home side won. Featuring twice in singles, he registered a win over Scott Barron (9–7 in the fifth set) then lost dead rubber to John Doran.

== ITF Futures titles ==
=== Singles: (1) ===
No.	Date	Tournament	Surface	Opponent	Score
1.	Jan 2000	France F2, Angers	Clay	(France) Nicolas Coutelot	6–4, 7–6^{(9)}

== See also ==
- List of Hungary Davis Cup team representatives
