= Sándor Noszály (tennis) =

Hungarian tennis player

- Country (sports): Hungary
- Residence: Budapest, Hungary
- Born: 16 March 1972 (age 53); Budapest, Hungary
- Height: 1.93 m (6 ft 4 in)
- Turned pro: 1988
- Retired: 2014
- Plays: Right-handed (two-handed backhand)
- Prize money: $376,265

Singles
- Career record: 28–57
- Career titles: 0
- Highest ranking: No. 95 (18 September 1995)

Grand Slam singles results
- Australian Open: 1R (1996)
- French Open: 1R (1991, 1996)
- Wimbledon: 1R (1995, 1996)

Other tournaments
- Olympic Games: 1R (1996)

Doubles
- Career record: 3–15
- Career titles: 0
- Highest ranking: No. 192 (29 May 1995)

Grand Slam doubles results
- Wimbledon: 1R (1993)

Other doubles tournaments
- Olympic Games: 1R (1992)
- Last updated on: 6 July 2014.

Sándor Noszály (Hungarian: Noszály Sándor, [ˈnosaːj ˈʃaːndor]; born 16 March 1972 in Budapest) is a retired tennis player from Hungary, who is a four-time Hungarian Champion in singles and 16 times adding the doubles.

== Career ==
Noszály qualified Hungary for the 1996 Atlanta Olympics. Four years earlier, in the 1992 Barcelona Olympics he was partnering László Markovits in the doubles draw, where they fell in the first round. He was the member of the Hungary Davis Cup team who advanced to the World Group in 1993 and 1995 where he won two singles against Argentines Guillermo Pérez Roldán and Alberto Mancini and one victory over Australia (Todd Woodbridge) respectively. In July 1995 he advanced to the quarterfinal of Kitzbühel Open by defeating Carlos Moyá in the previous round losing to clay-specialist Thomas Muster. Three months later he reached the Semifinal of the 1995 Bucharest Open, surpassing Albert Costa and Sergi Bruguera, facing Thomas Muster in a re-match, who overcame him in two sets. It was that time when he broke into the ATP top 100 peaking at World No. 95.

== Personal life ==
He was born to sr. Sándor Noszály, a coach and former high jump athlete and to Anna Steitz, a PE teacher and 2-time national champion high jumper. His sister Andrea Noszály (b. 1970) became a professional tennis player as well and represented Hungary 5 times in the Fed Cup. He graduated in 1990 at the Petõfi Sándor Gimnázium in Budapest.

He has one daughter called Szonja (b. 2003). He wasn't married and parted ways with his girlfriend just before participating in a dating reality TV show the same year. He began a relationship with Hungarian soap opera actress Heni Novák with whom he moved to the United States in 2010.

The couple split up in 2013, after a five-year relationship.

== Coaching and other ventures ==
Simultaneously with playing he began coaching Hungarian juniors and the Hungarian national team, including László Fonó and György Balázs whom he escorted to the 2003 French Open to see his protégé winning the doubles title partnering Dudi Sela. Shortly after Noszály won his fifth National Championship title following his nine-year gap in senior professional tennis.

Later that year he played the role of The Bachelor in the Hungarian version of the well known TV series. He now lives in the United States and coaches to this day.

== Playing style ==
He's known for his serve-and-volley playing style. His preferred court is clay.

== Titles ==
=== Doubles (1) ===
Legend (singles)
Grand Slam (0)
Tennis Masters Cup (0)
ATP Masters Series (0)
ATP Tour (0)
Challengers (1)

No.	Date	Tournament	Surface	Partnering	Opponents in the final	Score in the final
1.	5 June 1994	(Uzbekistan) Tashkent	Clay	(Morocco) Karim Alami	(Czech Republic) Daniel Fiala / (Czech Republic) Jan Kodeš	6–7, 6–4, 7–6
