= László Fonó =

Hungarian tennis player

- Country (sports): Hungary
- Born: 9 April 1981 (age 43); Budapest, Hungary
- Prize money: $16,688

Singles
- Career record: 0–1 (Davis Cup)
- Highest ranking: No. 608 (8 Mar 2004)

Doubles
- Career record: 4–0 (Davis Cup)
- Highest ranking: No. 407 (8 Mar 2004)

László Fonó (born 9 April 1981) is a Hungarian former professional tennis player. He is now a coach.

Fonó, a national doubles champion, was born in Budapest and represented the Hungary Davis Cup team in a five ties during the 2003 edition. He lost his only singles rubber to Lamine Ouahab but was unbeaten in four doubles outings.

On the professional tour he attained a best singles world ranking of 608 and ranked as high as 407 in doubles.

== ITF Futures finals ==
=== Singles: 1 (0–1) ===
Result	W–L	Date	Tournament	Surface	Opponent	Score
Loss	0–1	Jul 2001	Hungary F2, Pécs	Clay	(Slovenia) Iztok Božič	4–6, 2–6

=== Doubles: 4 (2–2) ===
Result	W–L	Date	Tournament	Surface	Partner	Opponents	Score
Win	1–0	Jun 1998	Hungary F2, Budapest	Clay	(Hungary) Krisztián Keresztes	(Hungary) Kornél Bardóczky (Hungary) Miklós Jancsó	6–1, 7–6
Loss	1–1	Aug 2002	Slovak Rep. F5, Ružomberok	Clay	(Hungary) Gergely Kisgyörgy	(Czech Republic) David Miketa (Czech Republic) Martin Štěpánek	0–6, 7–6^{(6)}, 2–6
Win	2–1	Aug 2003	Romania F9, Bucharest	Clay	(Hungary) Sebő Kiss	(France) Olivier Malcor (France) Nicolas Renavand	w/o
Loss	2–2	Oct 2003	Jamaica F10, Montego Bay	Hard	(Hungary) György Balázs	(United Kingdom) Daniel Kiernan (United Kingdom) David Sherwood	6–7^{(5)}, 2–6

== See also ==
- List of Hungary Davis Cup team representatives
