= János Benyik =

Hungarian tennis player

- Country (sports): Hungary
- Born: 4 June 1951 (age 73)
- Plays: Right-handed

Singles
- Career record: 8–20
- Career titles: 0
- Highest ranking: No. 170 (23 August 1973)

Grand Slam singles results
- French Open: 1R (1976)

Doubles
- Career record: 4–12
- Career titles: 0
- Highest ranking: 216 (1 March 1976)

János Benyik (born 4 June 1951) is a Hungarian former professional tennis player.

== Biography ==
Benyik, a right-handed player, was a two-time Hungarian national champion and competed on the professional tour in the 1970s.

While playing on the Grand Prix circuit he had wins over Frank Froehling, Paolo Bertolucci and Eliot Teltscher. He twice reached the quarter-finals of the Austrian Open and as a doubles player was a finalist at Shreveport in 1975, partnering Róbert Machán.

His only grand slam singles main draw appearance came at the 1976 French Open, where his first round opponent Antonio Muñoz won after being two sets down.

Between 1976 and 1983 he played 16 Davis Cup matches for Hungary, all in singles, from a total of nine ties. He later served as Hungary's Davis Cup captain and led the side to an upset win over Australia in 1995 to qualify for the World Group.

== Grand Prix career finals ==
=== Doubles: 1 (0–1) ===
Result	W-L	Date	Tournament	Surface	Partner	Opponents	Score
Loss	0–1	Mar 1975	Shreveport, United States	Carpet	(Hungary) Róbert Machán	(United States) William Brown (Spain) Juan Gisbert	6–4, 6–4

== See also ==
- List of Hungary Davis Cup team representatives
