= Antal Jancsó =

Hungarian tennis player (1934–2023)

- Country (sports): Hungary
- Born: 28 October 1934
- Died: 3 March 2023 (aged 88)

Singles
- Career record: 124-78
- Career titles: 9

Grand Slam singles results
- French Open: 4R (1958)
- Wimbledon: 2R (1957)

Antal Jancsó (28 October 1934 – 3 March 2023) was a Hungarian tennis player.

Jancsó's ancestors were originally from Transylvania.

Active on tour in the 1950s, Jancsó participated in Hungary's 1953 and 1954 Davis Cup campaigns. He won the Hungarian national doubles championship in 1956 with József Asbóth. In 1957, before the tiebreak was introduced, he played the longest ever French Championship match on record, losing an 83-game five set match to Bob Mark. He made the singles round of 16 at the 1958 French Championships, beating Bobby Wilson and Naresh Kumar en route. At the 1958 Italian Championships he partnered with Kurt Nielsen to win the doubles title.

== See also ==
- List of Hungary Davis Cup team representatives
