= Viktor Nagy (tennis) =

Hungarian tennis player

- Country (sports): Hungary
- Born: 4 October 1971 (age 54) Budapest, Hungary
- Height: 5 ft 10 in (178 cm)
- Plays: Right-handed

Singles
- Career record: 0–1
- Highest ranking: No. 258 (20 Jun 1994)

Doubles
- Highest ranking: No. 399 (1 Apr 1996)

Viktor Nagy (born 4 October 1971) is a Hungarian former professional tennis player.

== Biography ==
A native of Budapest, Nagy was the Hungarian national singles champion in 1994.

Nagy represented Hungary in the Davis Cup from 1991 to 1994, playing in three singles and two doubles rubbers. In 1993 he was a member of the team that defeated Argentina to qualify for the World Group for the first time.

While competing on the professional tour he had a best singles ranking of 258 and made an ATP Tour main draw appearance as a qualifier at the 1994 ATP St. Pölten, losing in the first round to Gilad Bloom.

== See also ==
- List of Hungary Davis Cup team representatives
