= Balázs Veress =

Hungarian tennis player

- Country (sports): Hungary
- Born: 12 October 1980 (age 45) Budapest, Hungary
- Height: 6 ft 1 in (185 cm)
- Plays: Right-handed

Singles
- Career record: 1–1 (Davis Cup)
- Highest ranking: No. 671 (19 July 1999)

Doubles
- Career record: 0–1 (Davis Cup)
- Highest ranking: No. 924 (29 Nov 1999)

Balázs Veress (born 12 October 1980) is a Hungarian former professional tennis player.

Born in Budapest, Veress was an Australian Open junior quarterfinalist and runner-up in Hungary's national championships. He was ranked in the top 20 on the ITF Junior World ranking with wins over players such as Roger Federer, Marat Safin, Nicholas Massu, Xavier Malisse, among others. In 1998 and 2002 he featured in ties for the Hungary Davis Cup team, registering a win in a singles rubber against South Africa's Rik de Voest. Before beginning his collegiate tennis player in the United States for the University of California, Berkeley Golden Bears, he reached 671 on the ATP ranking. While at the Cal Bears, In 2001 he was named both Pac-10 Freshman of the Year and ITA Regional Rookie of the Year. He served as team captain, leading the Bears to the No.7 spot in the collegiate rankings.

== See also ==
- List of Hungary Davis Cup team representatives
