= Vladimir Pavićević (tennis) =

Serbian tennis player

- Country (sports): Serbia and Montenegro
- Born: 26 February 1977 (age 48); Novi Sad, SR Serbia, SFR Yugoslavia
- Turned pro: 1993
- Retired: 2010
- Plays: Right-handed
- Prize money: $25,254

Singles
- Career record: 0–2
- Career titles: 0
- Highest ranking: No. 329 (23 Aug 2004)

Doubles
- Career record: 1–0
- Career titles: 0
- Highest ranking: No. 627 (25 Nov 1996)

Team competitions
- Davis Cup: 3–2 (Sin. 2–2, Dbs. 1–0)

Vladimir Pavićević (Serbian Cyrillic: Владимир Павићевић; born 26 February 1977) is a Serbian former professional tennis player.

== Career ==
Pavićević played collegiate tennis in the United States, initially for the University of South Carolina, and later for the University of Nevada, Las Vegas.

As a member of the Yugoslavia Davis Cup team, Pavićević recorded significant singles victories over Justin Bower and Louis Vosloo, clinching the tie against South Africa held in Belgrade in 2002.

In 2004, he won three ITF Futures singles titles and reached a career-high singles ranking of No. 329.

== ITF Futures finals ==
=== Singles: 6 (3–3) ===
Result	W–L	Date	Tournament	Surface	Opponent	Score
Loss	0–1	Sep 2001	Spain F11, Barcelona	Clay	(Spain) Óscar Hernández	3–6, 5–7
Loss	0–2	Aug 2002	Egypt F3, El Maadi	Clay	(France) Julien Jeanpierre	3–6, 0–6
Loss	0–3	Jul 2003	Serbia & Montenegro F5, Belgrade	Clay	(France) Stéphane Robert	3–6, 3–6
Win	1–3	May 2004	Bosnia and Herzegovina F1, Sarajevo	Clay	(Serbia and Montenegro) Ilija Bozoljac	2–6, 6–4, 6–3
Win	2–3	Jun 2004	Bosnia and Herzegovina F3, Prijedor	Clay	(Serbia and Montenegro) Darko Mađarovski	6–4, 6–3
Win	3–3	Aug 2004	Serbia and Montenegro F4, Zaječar	Clay	(Serbia and Montenegro) Nikola Ćirić	6–0, 6–3

=== Doubles: 1 (0–1) ===
Result	W–L	Date	Tournament	Surface	Partner	Opponents	Score
Loss	0–1	May 2004	Bosnia & Herzegovina F1, Sarajevo	Clay	(Serbia and Montenegro) Ilija Bozoljac	(Czech Republic) Jakub Hašek (Czech Republic) Josef Neštický	4–6, 4–6

== See also ==
- List of Serbia Davis Cup team representatives
