= Louis Vosloo =

South African tennis player

- Full name: Louis Vosloo
- Country (sports): South Africa
- Born: 29 January 1978 (age 47); Pietersburg, South Africa
- Turned pro: 1997
- Retired: 2005
- Plays: Right-handed
- Prize money: $133,880

Singles
- Highest ranking: No. 170 (5 August 2002)

Doubles
- Highest ranking: No. 275 (17 March 2003)

Louis Vosloo (born 29 January 1978) is a former professional tennis player from South Africa.

== Biography ==
Vosloo comes from Pietersburg and turned professional in 1997. He was a member of the silver medal winning South African team at the 1999 All-Africa Games. During his career he played on the Challenger and Futures circuits, with his wins including players James Blake and Robin Söderling. He also participated in qualifying at all four Grand Slam events. In 2002 he won two Challenger tournaments and represented the South Africa Davis Cup team in a tie against Yugoslavia in Belgrade. In the Davis Cup tie he played two singles matches, which he both lost in four sets, to Dušan Vemić and Vladimir Pavićević.

At the end of his playing career he opened up a tennis academy in South Africa, where he coached local juniors for two years. In 2008 he moved to the United States and worked at first at Cliff Drysdale's Brickell Tennis Club in Miami. He was then the Director of Tennis at Dunes Golf and Tennis Club in Sanibel, Florida and the Sundial Beach and Golf Resort. From 2010 to 2012, Vosloo coached Kevin Anderson on the ATP Tour, at a time he climbed from outside the world's top 100 to a top 30 ranking. Vosloo, who is married with two children, now works as the Director of Tennis at The Club at Longview, in Charlotte, North Carolina.

== Challenger titles ==
=== Singles: (1) ===
| No. | Year | Tournament | Surface | Opponent | Score |
|---|---|---|---|---|---|
| 1. | 2002 | Gosford, Australia | Hard | (Slovakia) Ladislav Švarc | 3–6, 7–6^{(11)}, 6–3 |

=== Doubles: (1) ===
| No. | Year | Tournament | Surface | Partner | Opponents | Score |
|---|---|---|---|---|---|---|
| 1. | 2002 | Burbank, U. S. | Hard | (Sweden) Björn Rehnquist | (Brazil) Daniel Melo (Peru) Iván Miranda | 7–6^{(6)}, 6–1 |

== See also ==
- List of South Africa Davis Cup team representatives
