= Zsolt Tatár =

Hungarian tennis player

- Country (sports): Hungary
- Born: 18 August 1981 (age 44)

Singles
- Career record: 0–1 (Davis Cup)
- Highest ranking: No. 703 (10 Jun 2002)

Doubles
- Highest ranking: No. 776 (18 Aug 2003)

Zsolt Tatár (born 18 August 1981) is a Hungarian former professional tennis player.

Tatár reached career best rankings of 703 for singles and 776 for doubles while competing on the professional tour, mostly in ITF level tournaments. He made the singles quarter-finals of the 2001 Budapest Challenger, which was his best result on the ATP Challenger Tour, securing wins over Nicolas Coutelot and Lovro Zovko. In 2002 he represented Hungary in a Davis Cup tie in Luxembourg, losing a singles dead rubber to Gilles Kremer.

== ITF Futures finals ==
=== Doubles: 3 (0–3) ===
Result	W–L	Date	Tournament	Surface	Partner	Opponents	Score
Loss	0–1	May 2003	Hungary F2, Hódmezővásárhely	Clay	(Hungary) Sebő Kiss	(Hungary) Kornél Bardóczky (Hungary) Gergely Kisgyörgy	1–6, 6–7^{(4)}
Loss	0–2	May 2004	Hungary F2, Hódmezővásárhely	Clay	(Netherlands) Melle van Gemerden	(Hungary) Kornél Bardóczky (Romania) Gabriel Moraru	5–7, 7–6^{(3)}, 3–6
Loss	0–3	Aug 2004	Croatia F4, Čakovec	Clay	(Hungary) Sebő Kiss	(Croatia) Ivan Cerović (Croatia) Krešimir Ritz	6–7^{(8)}, 4–6

== See also ==
- List of Hungary Davis Cup team representatives
