= Dénes Lukács (tennis) =

Hungarian tennis player

- Country (sports): Hungary
- Residence: Dallas, United States
- Born: 25 February 1987 (age 39) Eger, Hungary
- Height: 1.80 m (5 ft 11 in)
- Retired: 2012
- Plays: Right-handed (Double-handed backhand)
- Prize money: $20,479 USD

Singles
- Career record: 2–3 (ATP Tour level, Grand Slam level, and Davis Cup)
- Career titles: 0
- Highest ranking: No. 402 (7 May 2012)

Doubles
- Career record: 0–0 (ATP Tour level, Grand Slam level, and Davis Cup)
- Career titles: 0
- Highest ranking: 975 (19 March 2012)
- Last updated on: 22 May 2018.

Dénes Lukács (Hungarian: Lukács Dénes; born 25 February 1987 in Eger) is a retired tennis player from Hungary.

Lukács has a career high ATP singles ranking of 402 achieved on 7 May 2012. He also has a career high ATP doubles ranking of 975, achieved on 19 March 2012. Lukács has won 2 ITF singles and 1 doubles titles.

Lukács has represented Hungary at Davis Cup, where he has a win–loss record of 2–3.

He played tennis at Baylor University between 2006 and 2010.

== Future and Challenger finals ==
=== Singles: 4 (2–2) ===
Legend
Challengers 0 (0–0)
Futures 4 (2–2)

Outcome	No.	Date	Tournament	Surface	Opponent	Score
Runner-up	1.	February 27, 2011	(United States) Brownsville, USA F5	Hard	(United States) Nicholas Monroe	3–6, 6–3, 1–6
Winner	2.	May 28, 2011	Durban, South Africa F2	Hard	(United Kingdom) Joshua Milton	6–2, 6–0
Runner-up	3.	August 21, 2011	Novi Sad, Serbia F7	Clay	(Austria) Michael Linzer	2–6, 6–3, 2–6
Winner	4.	March 18, 2012	Loulé, Portugal F3	Hard	(Belgium) Niels Desein	6–4, 6–1

=== Doubles 3 (1–2) ===
Legend
Challengers 0 (0–0)
Futures 3 (1–2)

Outcome	No.	Date	Tournament	Surface	Partner	Opponents	Score
Winner	1.	June 24, 2007	Marburg, Germany F6	Clay	(Hungary) Kornél Bardóczky	(Canada) Érik Chvojka (Germany) Philipp Piyamongkol	7–5, 5–7, 6–4
Runner-up	2.	August 14, 2011	Subotica, Serbia F6	Clay	(Hungary) Ádám Kellner	(Croatia) Dino Marcan (Croatia) Antonio Šančić	4–6, 6–4, [7–10]
Runner-up	3.	March 4, 2012	Faro, Portugal F1	Hard	(Germany) Steven Moneke	(Portugal) Gonçalo Falcão (Portugal) Pedro Sousa	5–7, 4–6

== Davis Cup ==
=== Participations: (2–3) ===
Group membership World Group (0–0) WG Play-off (0–0) Group I (0–0) Group II (2–3) Group III (0–0) Group IV (0–0)	Matches by surface Hard (1–0) Clay (1–3) Grass (0–0) Carpet (0–0)	Matches by type Singles (2–3) Doubles (0–0)

- ▲ ▼ indicates the outcome of the Davis Cup match followed by the score, date, place of event, the zonal classification and its phase, and the court surface.

Rubber outcome	No.	Rubber	Match type (partner if any)	Opponent nation	Opponent player(s)	Score
▲4–1; 4–6 March 2005; Hód Tennis Centre, Hódmezővásárhely, Hungary; Europe/Africa First round; Hard (indoor) surface *
Victory	1	V	Singles (dead rubber)	Monaco	Thomas Drouet	6–4, 6–2
▲3–2; 21–23 July 2006; Locomotiv Plovdiv Tennis Centre, Plovdiv, Bulgaria; Europe/Africa Second round; Clay surface
Defeat	2	IV	Singles (dead rubber)	Bulgaria	Todor Enev	3–6, 5–7
▲5–0; 18–20 July 2008; Thessaloniki Tennis Club, Thessaloniki, Greece; Europe/Africa Relegetion play-off; Clay surface
Victory	3	IV	Singles (dead rubber)	Greece	Konstantinos Mikos	6–1, 6–2
▲3–2; 10–12 July 2009; Gödöllő Kiskastély, Gödöllő, Hungary; Europe/Africa First round; Clay surface
Defeat	4	II	Singles	Moldova	Andrei Gorban	4–6, 6–2, 5–7, 1–6
Defeat	5	V	Singles (dead rubber)	Moldova	Radu Albot	3–6, 2–6

* Monaco chose to play in Hungary

== Sources ==
- Dénes Lukács at the Association of Tennis Professionals
- Dénes Lukács at World Tennis
- Dénes Lukács at the Davis Cup (archived)
