= Róbert Machán =

Hungarian tennis player

- Country (sports): Hungary
- Born: 18 October 1948 (age 77) Budapest, Hungary

Singles
- Career record: 15–32
- Career titles: 0
- Highest ranking: No. 102 (23 August 1973)

Grand Slam singles results
- Australian Open: 1R (1973)
- French Open: 2R (1973)
- Wimbledon: 1R (1973)

Doubles
- Career record: 20–29
- Career titles: 0
- Highest ranking: No. 175 (1 March 1976)

Grand Slam doubles results
- Australian Open: 1R (1973)
- French Open: 3R (1971)
- Wimbledon: 1R (1973)

Robert Machan (born 18 October 1948) is a former professional tennis player from Hungary. He enjoyed most of his tennis success while playing doubles. During his career, he finished runner-up in three doubles events.

Machan participated in 21 Davis Cup ties for Hungary from 1969 to 1985, posting a 9–6 record in doubles and a 5–10 record in singles.

== Career finals ==
=== Doubles (3 runner-ups) ===
Result	W-L	Date	Tournament	Surface	Partner	Opponents	Score
Loss	0–1	Oct 1973	Prague, Czechoslovakia	Clay	(Hungary) Balázs Taróczy	(Czechoslovakia) Jan Kodeš (Czechoslovakia) Vladimír Zedník	3–6, 6–7
Loss	0–2	May 1974	Florence, Italy	Clay	(Hungary) Balázs Taróczy	(Italy) Paolo Bertolucci (Italy) Adriano Panatta	3–6, 6–3, 4–6
Loss	0–3	Mar 1975	Shreveport, United States	Carpet	(Hungary) János Benyik	(United States) William Brown (Spain) Juan Gisbert Sr.	4–6, 4–6
