= John Doran (tennis) =

Irish tennis player

- Country (sports): (Republic of Ireland) Ireland
- Born: 16 May 1978 (age 46)
- Plays: Right-handed

Singles
- Career record: 4–4
- Career titles: 0
- Highest ranking: No. 357 (20 August 2001)

Doubles
- Career record: 2–2
- Career titles: 0
- Highest ranking: No. 253 (8 July 2002)

John Doran (born 16 May 1978) is a former professional tennis player from Ireland.

Doran played in 12 Davis Cup ties for Ireland between 1996 and 2004. He had an 8/6 record in singles and was 5/3 in doubles.

His best result on tour came at a Challenger tournament in 2002, at Gosford, Australia, where he and Andrew Painter were doubles runners-up.

He is a graduate from Harvard University.
