= Gábor Jaross =

Hungarian tennis player

- Country (sports): Hungary
- Born: 3 February 1979 (age 46) Budapest, Hungary
- Height: 6 ft 2 in (188 cm)
- Plays: Right-handed

Singles
- Career record: 0–1 (Davis Cup)
- Highest ranking: No. 687 (3 Aug 1998)

Doubles
- Highest ranking: No. 706 (7 Dec 1998)

Gábor Jaross (born 3 February 1979) is a Hungarian former professional tennis player.

Born in Budapest, Jaross was a national indoor champion and made a Davis Cup appearance for Hungary against South Africa in 2002, losing his singles rubber to Wesley Moodie. He also played collegiate tennis in the United States for Hawaii Pacific University, where he achieved All-American honors. In 2003 he was a Hungarian representative at the 2003 Summer Universiade, held in Daegu.

== See also ==
- List of Hungary Davis Cup team representatives
