= Attila Sávolt =

Hungarian tennis player

Sávolt Attila
- Country (sports): Hungary
- Residence: Budapest, Hungary
- Born: 5 February 1976 (age 49) Budapest, Hungary
- Height: 1.83 m (6 ft 0 in)
- Turned pro: 1995
- Retired: 2006
- Plays: Right-handed (one-handed backhand)
- Prize money: $698,823

Singles
- Career record: 37-58
- Career titles: 0
- Highest ranking: No. 68 (20 April 2002)

Grand Slam singles results
- Australian Open: 2R (2002)
- French Open: 3R (2000, 2003)
- Wimbledon: 1R (2002)
- US Open: 1R (2000, 2002)

Doubles
- Career record: 14-16
- Career titles: 0
- Highest ranking: No. 133 (28 January 2002)

Grand Slam doubles results
- Australian Open: 1R (1999, 2002)

Attila Sávolt (born 5 February 1976) is a tennis player from Hungary, who represented his native country at the 2000 Sydney Olympics where he lost to Paradorn Srichaphan in his first match. Starting his professional career in 1995, he peaked the ATP-ranking on May 20, 2002, reaching 68 on the world rankings. Surprisingly he has a 1-0 head to head against Tim Henman after beating the 4th seed 11th ranked in the 2003 Dubai Tennis Championships. He also defeated Jiří Novák in their only ATP Tour match-up at the 2002 Orange Warsaw Open, when the Czech was ranked 5th in the world. He participated in the 2004 Hopman Cup alongside Petra Mandula. He won the Hungarian Championships two times. He was coaching Márton Fucsovics and is currently a sports commentary on Sport 1.

== Titles ==
=== Singles (6) ===
Legend (singles)
Grand Slam (0)
Tennis Masters Cup (0)
ATP Masters Series (0)
ATP Tour (0)
Challengers (6)

| No. | Date | Tournament | Surface | Opponent in final | Score in final |
|---|---|---|---|---|---|
| 1. | 1996 | Tampere | Clay | (Spain) Jacobo Díaz | 7–6, 1–6, 6–4 |
| 2. | 1997 | Tampere | Clay | (Australia) Todd Larkham | 7–5, 6–0 |
| 3. | 1999 | Nettingsdorf | Clay | (Austria) Markus Hipfl | 6–1, 6–0 |
| 4. | 1999 | Manerbio | Clay | (France) Thierry Guardiola | 6–4, 7–6 |
| 5. | 2001 | Sassuolo | Clay | (Italy) Giorgio Galimberti | 6–4, 7–5 |
| 6. | 2001 | Manerbio | Clay | (Georgia (country)) Irakli Labadze | 7–5, 6–2 |

=== Doubles (6) ===
| No. | Date | Tournament | Surface | Partnering | Opponents in the final | Score in the final |
|---|---|---|---|---|---|---|
| 1. | 15 September 1996 | Budapest II | Clay | (Hungary) László Markovits | (Finland) Tuomas Ketola (Slovenia) Borut Urh | Walkover |
| 2. | 14 June 1998 | Split | Clay | (United States) Geoff Grant | (Spain) Álex López Morón (Spain) Alberto Martín | 4–6, 6–3, 6–2 |
| 3. | 11 October 1998 | Santiago | Clay | (Czech Republic) Ota Fukárek | (Netherlands) Edwin Kempes (Netherlands) Peter Wessels | 7–6, 6–4 |
| 4. | 22 August 1999 | Sylt | Clay | (Germany) Rene Nicklisch | (Italy) Florian Allgauer (Italy) Davide Scala | 4–6, 6–3, 6–1 |
| 5. | 24 June 2001 | Lugano | Clay | (Australia) Steven Randjelovic | (Netherlands) Bobbie Altelaar (South Africa) Shaun Rudman | 6–2, 7–6 |
| 6. | 26 August 2001 | Manerbio | Clay | (Austria) Thomas Strenberger | (Italy) Alessandro da Col (Italy) Andrea Stoppini | 7–5, 7–5 |

== Lifetime overall against notable players ==
| (Germany) Nicolas Kiefer | 2-0 |
| (Russia) Igor Kunitsyn | 2-0 |
| (France) Nicolas Mahut | 2-0 |
| (Russia) Mikhail Youzhny | 3-1 |
| (Slovakia) Karol Kučera | 2-1 |
| (Czech Republic) Tomáš Berdych | 1-0 |
| (Russia) Nikolay Davydenko | 1-0 |
| (South Africa) Wayne Ferreira | 1-0 |
| (Spain) David Ferrer | 1-0 |
| (United Kingdom) Tim Henman | 1-0 |
| (Austria) Jürgen Melzer | 1-0 |
| (Germany) Rainer Schüttler | 1-0 |
| (Argentina) Guillermo Cañas | 1-1 |
| (Argentina) Gastón Gaudio | 1-1 |
| (Ecuador) Nicolás Lapentti | 1-1 |
| (Spain) Feliciano López | 1-1 |
| (Czech Republic) Jiří Novák | 1-1 |

(Including Challengers)
