= Sebő Kiss =

Hungarian tennis player (born 1983)

- Country (sports): Hungary
- Born: 20 September 1983 (age 42)
- Plays: Left-handed
- Prize money: $26,254

Singles
- Career record: 9–10 (Davis Cup)
- Highest ranking: No. 531 (19 Sep 2005)

Doubles
- Career record: 6–0 (Davis Cup)
- Highest ranking: No. 444 (30 Aug 2004)

Sebő Kiss (born 20 September 1983) is a Hungarian former professional tennis player.

A left-handed player, Kiss competed mostly in ITF Futures tournaments and won seven titles, two in singles and five in doubles. He had a career high singles ranking of 531 in the world.

Kiss represented the Hungary Davis Cup team from 2003 to 2011, appearing in 16 ties. His Davis Cup career included a win over former top-50 player Irakli Labadze in 2006. In his final tie, against Great Britain in 2011, he came up against Andy Murray. By this stage he was a full-time law student and no longer featured in professional tournaments.

== ITF Futures titles ==
=== Singles: (2) ===
No.	Date	Tournament	Surface	Opponent	Score
1.	Apr 2005	Hungary F1, Budapest	Clay	(Slovenia) Grega Žemlja	6–1, 6–2
2.	Jul 2006	Hungary F1, Hódmezővásárhely	Clay	(Czech Republic) Roman Vögeli	4–6, 7–5, 6–3

=== Doubles: (5) ===
No.	Date	Tournament	Surface	Partner	Opponents	Score
1.	Aug 2003	Romania F9, Bucharest	Clay	(Hungary) László Fonó	(France) Olivier Malcor (France) Nicolas Renavand	w/o
2.	May 2004	Hungary F1, Szolnok	Clay	(Hungary) György Balázs	(Italy) Alberto Brizzi (Germany) Christian Grünes	w/o
3.	Aug 2006	Hungary F1, Hódmezővásárhely	Clay	(Hungary) György Balázs	(Slovakia) Michal Pažický (Slovakia) Ján Stančík	6–2, 6–2
4.	Jul 2007	Hungary F1, Budapest	Clay	(Hungary) Gergely Kisgyörgy	(Czech Republic) Marek Michalička (Czech Republic) Martin Poboril	7–6^{(3)}, 6–1
5.	Sep 2007	Germany F16, Friedberg	Clay	(Hungary) Kornél Bardóczky	(Netherlands) Daniel Lagendaal (Netherlands) Michel Meijer	6–4, 7–6^{(4)}

== See also ==
- List of Hungary Davis Cup team representatives
