= 1997 Swedish Open – Doubles =

Doubles
- 1997 Swedish Open

Final
- Champions: (Sweden) Nicklas Kulti (Sweden) Mikael Tillström
- Runners-up: (Sweden) Magnus Gustafsson (Sweden) Magnus Larsson
- Score: 6–0, 6–3

Details
- Draw: 16 (3WC/1Q)
- Seeds: 4

Events
Singles	Doubles
← 1996 ·	Swedish Open	· 1998 →

David Ekerot and Jeff Tarango were the defending champions, but competed this year with different partners. Ekerot teamed up with Peter Nyborg and lost to tournament winners Nicklas Kulti and Mikael Tillström, while Tarango teamed up with Jack Waite and lost in semifinals to tournament runners-up Magnus Gustafsson and Magnus Larsson.

Kulti and Tillström won the title by defeating Gustafsson and Larsson 6–0, 6–3 in the final. The final saw an unusual event, as both pairs were wild cards.

== Seeds ==
1. (United States) Jeff Tarango / (United States) Jack Waite (semifinals)
2. (Sweden) David Ekerot / (Sweden) Peter Nyborg (first round)
3. (United States) Mark Keil / (Brazil) Fernando Meligeni (quarterfinals)
4. (Czech Republic) Sláva Doseděl / (Czech Republic) Pavel Vízner (first round)

== Draw ==
=== Key ===
- Q = Qualifier
- WC = Wild card
- LL = Lucky loser
- Alt = Alternate
- ITF = ITF entry
- PR = Protected ranking
- SR = Special ranking
- SE = Special exempt
- JE = Junior exempt
- JR = Junior Accelerator Programme entrant
- CO = College Accelerator Programme entrant
- NG = Next Gen Accelerator Program entrant
- w/o = Walkover
- r = Retired
- d = Defaulted

=== Draw ===
First round
1	(United States) J Tarango (United States) J Waite	6	6
Q	(Sweden) T Nydahl (Romania) A Pavel	4	2
(United States) B Coupe (South Africa) P Rosner	6	7
(Australia) W Arthurs (Australia) A Kratzmann	3	6
4	(Czech Republic) S Doseděl (Czech Republic) P Vízner	4	1
(Sweden) P Fredriksson (Sweden) M Norman	6	6
(Netherlands) T Kempers (Australia) P Kilderry	6	2	0
WC	(Sweden) M Gustafsson (Sweden) M Larsson	3	6	6
(Sweden) F Bergh (Hungary) G Köves	4	0
(South Africa) B Haygarth (United States) G Van Emburgh	6	6
WC	(Sweden) H Andersson (Sweden) N Timfjord	1	5
3	(United States) M Keil (Brazil) F Meligeni	6	7
(Germany) P Baur (Germany) M Huning	7	6
(United States) D Bowen (United States) S Melville	5	4
WC	(Sweden) N Kulti (Sweden) M Tillström	6	6
2	(Sweden) D Ekerot (Sweden) P Nyborg	1	4

Quarterfinals
1	(United States) J Tarango (United States) J Waite	7	6
(United States) B Coupe (South Africa) P Rosner	5	1
(Sweden) P Fredriksson (Sweden) M Norman	6	2
WC	(Sweden) M Gustafsson (Sweden) M Larsson	7	6
(South Africa) B Haygarth (United States) G Van Emburgh	6	6
3	(United States) M Keil (Brazil) F Meligeni	1	1
(Germany) P Baur (Germany) M Huning	3	6
WC	(Sweden) N Kulti (Sweden) M Tillström	6	7

Semifinals
1	(United States) J Tarango (United States) J Waite	4	3
WC	(Sweden) M Gustafsson (Sweden) M Larsson	6	6
(South Africa) B Haygarth (United States) G Van Emburgh	3	6
WC	(Sweden) N Kulti (Sweden) M Tillström	6	7

Final
WC	(Sweden) M Gustafsson (Sweden) M Larsson	0	3
WC	(Sweden) N Kulti (Sweden) M Tillström	6	6
