= 1999 Investor Swedish Open – Doubles =

Doubles
- 1999 Swedish Open

Final
- Champions: (South Africa) D Adams (United States) J Tarango
- Runners-up: (Sweden) Nicklas Kulti (Sweden) Mikael Tillström
- Score: 7–6 ^{(8–6)}, 6–4

Events
Singles	men	women
Doubles	men	women
← 1998 ·	Swedish Open	· 2000 →

Magnus Gustafsson and Magnus Larsson were the defending champions, but they did not participate this year.

David Adams and Jeff Tarango won the title by defeating Nicklas Kulti and Mikael Tillström, 7–6 ^{(8–6)}, 6–4 in the final.

== Seeds ==
Champion seeds are indicated in bold text while text in italics indicates the round in which those seeds were eliminated.

1. **(South Africa) David Adams / (United States) Jeff Tarango (champions)**
2. (Sweden) Nicklas Kulti / (Sweden) Mikael Tillström (final)
3. (United States) Devin Bowen / (United States) Brandon Coupe (first round)
4. (Spain) Eduardo Nicolás / (Spain) Germán Puentes (semifinals)

== Draw ==
Key

- Q = Qualifier
- WC = Wild card
- LL = Lucky loser
- Alt = Alternate
- ITF = ITF entry
- PR = Protected ranking
- SR = Special ranking
- SE = Special exempt
- JE = Junior exempt
- JR = Junior Accelerator Programme entrant
- CO = College Accelerator Programme entrant
- NG = Next Gen Accelerator Program entrant
- w/o = Walkover
- r = Retired
- d = Defaulted

=== Finals ===
First round
1	(South Africa) **D Adams** **(United States) J Tarango**	**6**	**7**
(Spain) A Berasategui (Spain) F Roig	1	5
Q	(Sweden) **S Aspelin** **(Sweden) J Landsberg**	2	**6**	**6**
(United States) M Keil (Argentina) M Rodríguez	**6**	2	3
3	(United States) D Bowen (United States) B Coupe	**6**	0	0
WC	(Sweden) **F Jonsson** **(Sweden) A Vinciguera**	3	**6**	**6**
WC	(Sweden) **M Gustafsson** **(Sweden) M Norman**	**6**	**6**
(Australia) A Painter (South Africa) B Talbot	2	4
(Czech Republic) **T Cibulec** **(Czech Republic) P Pála**	**6**	**6**
(Italy) M Ardinghi (Italy) M Valeri	4	3
(Australia) P Kilderry (Germany) M Kohlmann	1	6
4	(Spain) **E Nicolás** **(Spain) G Puentes**	**6**	**7**
(United States) **A Peterson** **(United States) J Waite**	**6**	5	**7**
(Romania) D Pescariu (Italy) V Santopadre	4	**7**	5
WC	(Slovakia) D Hrbatý (Sweden) T Johansson	5	**7**	1
2	(Sweden) **N Kulti** **(Sweden) M Tillström**	**7**	6	**6**

Quarterfinals
1	(South Africa) **D Adams** **(United States) J Tarango**	4	3
Q	(Sweden) S Aspelin (Sweden) J Landsberg	**6**	0	r
WC	(Sweden) F Jonsson (Sweden) A Vinciguera	2	2
WC	(Sweden) **M Gustafsson** **(Sweden) M Norman**	**6**	**6**
(Czech Republic) T Cibulec (Czech Republic) P Pála	3	**6**	2
4	(Spain) **E Nicolás** **(Spain) G Puentes**	**6**	2	**6**
(United States) A Peterson (United States) J Waite	3	**6**	2
(Sweden) **N Kulti** **(Sweden) M Tillström**	**6**	3	**6**

Semifinals
1	(South Africa) **D Adams** **(United States) J Tarango**	**6**	**6**
WC	(Sweden) M Gustafsson (Sweden) M Norman	2	3
4	(Spain) E Nicolás (Spain) G Puentes	0	2
2	(Sweden) **N Kulti** **(Sweden) M Tillström**	**6**	**6**

Final
1	(South Africa) **D Adams** **(United States) J Tarango**	**7**	**6**
2	(Sweden) N Kulti (Sweden) M Tillström	6	4
