= 1998 Investor Swedish Open – Singles =

Singles
- 1998 Swedish Open

Final
- Champion: (Sweden) Magnus Gustafsson
- Runner-up: (Ukraine) Andriy Medvedev
- Score: 6–2, 6–3

Details
- Draw: 32
- Seeds: 8

Events
Singles	Doubles
← 1997 ·	Swedish Open	· 1999 →

The 1998 Swedish Open was a men's tennis tournament played on Clay in Båstad, Sweden that was part of the International Series of the 1998 ATP Tour. It was the fifty-first edition of the tournament and was held from 6–12 July 1998.

== Seeds ==
Champion seeds are indicated in bold text while text in italics indicates the round in which those seeds were eliminated.

1. (Sweden) **Magnus Gustafsson (champion)**
2. (Sweden) Magnus Norman (second round)
3. (Italy) Andrea Gaudenzi (quarterfinals)
4. (Sweden) Magnus Larsson (first round)
5. (Australia) Richard Fromberg (second round)
6. (Sweden) Thomas Johansson (semifinals)
7. (Slovakia) Dominik Hrbatý (semifinals)
8. (Spain) Carlos Costa (second round)

== Draw ==
=== Key ===
- Q = Qualifier
- WC = Wild card
- LL = Lucky loser
- Alt = Alternate
- SE = Special exempt
- PR = Protected ranking
- ITF = ITF entry
- JE = Junior exempt
- w/o = Walkover
- r = Retired
- d = Defaulted
- SR = Special ranking

=== Finals ===
Semifinals
1	**(Sweden) Magnus Gustafsson**	**6**	**7**
6	(Sweden) Thomas Johansson	3	**6**	5
**(Ukraine) Andriy Medvedev**	**6**	**7**
7	(Slovakia) Dominik Hrbatý	3	6^{2}

Final
1	**(Sweden) Magnus Gustafsson**	**6**	**6**
(Ukraine) Andriy Medvedev	2	3

=== Top half ===
First round
1	**(Sweden) M Gustafsson**	**6**	**6**
(Sweden) F Jonsson	1	3
**(Austria) M Hipfl**	**6**	1	**7**
(Sweden) A Vinciguerra	2	**6**	6^{5}
**(France) J Golmard**	**6**	**6**
(Argentina) F Squillari	4	2
8	**(Spain) C Costa**	**6**	**6**
(Sweden) T Nydahl	2	2
**(Spain) F Vicente**	**7**	**6**
4	(Sweden) M Larsson	6^{4}	0
**(Morocco) K Alami**	5
(Romania) A Pavel	0	R
**(Italy) D Sanguinetti**	**6**	**6**
(Sweden) M Tillström	3	2
6	**(Sweden) T Johansson**	**7**	**6**
(France) A Clément	5	1

Second round
1	**(Sweden) M Gustafsson**	2	**6**	**6**
(Austria) M Hipfl	**6**	1	2
**(France) J Golmard**	**6**	**6**
8	(Spain) C Costa	2	4
(Spain) F Vicente	**6**	6^{3}	4
**(Morocco) K Alami**	1	**7**	**6**
(Italy) D Sanguinetti	**7**	3	6^{5}
6	**(Sweden) T Johansson**	6^{5}	**6**	**7**

Quarterfinals
1	**(Sweden) M Gustafsson**	6^{7}	1
(France) J Golmard	**7**	0	R
(Morocco) K Alami
6	**(Sweden) T Johansson**	w/o

Semifinals
1	**(Sweden) M Gustafsson**	**6**	4	**7**
6	(Sweden) T Johansson	3	**6**	5

=== Bottom half ===
First round
5	**(Australia) R Fromberg**	**6**	**6**
(Spain) J Sánchez	1	2
**(Ukraine) A Medvedev**	**6**	**6**
(Germany) B Karbacher	2	1
**(Costa Rica) JA Marín**	4	**7**	**6**
(France) A Di Pasquale	**6**	6^{3}	4
3	**(Italy) A Gaudenzi**	3	**6**	**6**
(Italy) D Nargiso	**6**	2	1
7	**(Slovakia) D Hrbatý**	**6**	1
(Spain) J Burillo	3	1	R
**(Russia) M Safin**	**6**	**7**
(United States) J Palmer	3	5
**(Czech Republic) J Novák**	**7**	**6**
(Romania) D Pescariu	5	4
2	**(Sweden) M Norman**	**7**	**6**
(Morocco) H Arazi	5	4

Second round
5	(Australia) R Fromberg	**7**	5	6^{2}
**(Ukraine) A Medvedev**	6^{5}	**7**	**7**
(Costa Rica) JA Marín	2	5
3	**(Italy) A Gaudenzi**	**6**	**7**
7	**(Slovakia) D Hrbatý**	1	**6**	**6**
(Russia) M Safin	**6**	2	1
**(Czech Republic) J Novák**	4	**6**	**6**
2	(Sweden) M Norman	**6**	2	2

Quarterfinals
**(Ukraine) A Medvedev**	**6**	**6**
3	(Italy) A Gaudenzi	3	4
7	**(Slovakia) D Hrbatý**	3	**6**	**6**
(Czech Republic) J Novák	**6**	4	4

Semifinals
**(Ukraine) A Medvedev**	**6**	**7**
7	(Slovakia) D Hrbatý	3	6^{2}
