= 1999 Investor Swedish Open – Singles =

Singles
- 1999 Investor Swedish Open

Final
- Champion: (Costa Rica) Juan Antonio Marín
- Runner-up: (Sweden) Andreas Vinciguerra
- Score: 6–4, 7–6^{(7–4)}

Details
- Draw: 32
- Seeds: 8

Events
Singles	Doubles
← 1998 ·	Swedish Open	· 2000 →

The defending champion was Magnus Gustafsson, but he lost in the second round to Martín Rodríguez. The unseeded Juan Antonio Marín from Costa Rica won the singles title.

== Seeds ==
A champion seed is indicated in bold text while text in italics indicates the round in which that seed was eliminated.

1. (Slovakia) Dominik Hrbatý (first round)
2. (Sweden) Thomas Johansson (second round)
3. (Sweden) Magnus Gustafsson (second round)
4. (Spain) Fernando Vicente (first round)
5. (Norway) Christian Ruud (semifinals)
6. (Sweden) Magnus Norman (quarterfinals)
7. (Argentina) Gastón Gaudio (first round)
8. (Slovakia) Ján Krošlák (first round)

== Draw ==
=== Key ===
- Q = Qualifier
- WC = Wild card
- LL = Lucky loser
- Alt = Alternate
- SE = Special exempt
- PR = Protected ranking
- ITF = ITF entry
- JE = Junior exempt
- w/o = Walkover
- r = Retired
- d = Defaulted
- SR = Special ranking

First round
1	(Slovakia) D Hrbatý	1	2
(United States) **J Tarango**	**6**	**6**
Q	(Sweden) N Timfjord	1	6^{1}
(Spain) **G Blanco**	**6**	**7^{7}**
WC	(Sweden) **A Vinciguerra**	**7**	**6**
(Australia) R Fromberg	5	4
Q	(Austria) **M Hipfl**	**6**	**6**
7	(Argentina) G Gaudio	3	1
3	(Sweden) **M Gustafsson**	**6**	**6**
(Italy) V Santopadre	2	4
(Argentina) **M Rodríguez**	1	**6**	**7**
(Germany) B Karbacher	**6**	3	5
(Argentina) **H Gumy**	**6**	**6**
(Italy) D Sanguinetti	2	1
Q	(Sweden) J Örtegren	3	2
5	(Norway) **C Ruud**	**6**	**6**
6	(Sweden) **M Norman**	**6**	**6**
WC	(Sweden) M Tillström	2	0
Q	(Spain) **E Nicolás**	**6**	**6**
(Germany) H Dreekmann	2	3
(Romania) D Pescariu	3	0
(Costa Rica) **JA Marín**	**6**	**6**
(Czech Republic) **S Doseděl**	5	**7**	**6**
4	(Spain) F Vicente	**7**	5	2
8	(Slovakia) J Krošlák	**6**	1	3
(Spain) **G Puentes**	4	**6**	**6**
(Spain) **J Alonso**	3	**7**	**6**
(Spain) J Díaz	**6**	5	4
(Germany) M Kohlmann	**6**	4	3
WC	(Sweden) **N Kulti**	1	**6**	**6**
(Spain) A Berasategui	3	**6**	4
2	(Sweden) **T Johansson**	**6**	1	**6**

Second round
1	(United States) J Tarango	2	5
(Spain) **G Blanco**	**6**	**7**
WC	(Sweden) **A Vinciguerra**	**7^{9}**	**6**
Q	(Austria) **M Hipfl**	6^{7}	1
3	(Sweden) M Gustafsson	6^{5}	**6**	1
(Argentina) **M Rodríguez**	**7^{7}**	4	**6**
(Argentina) H Gumy	2	2
5	(Norway) **C Ruud**	**6**	**6**
6	(Sweden) **M Norman**	**6**	**6**
Q	(Spain) E Nicolás	3	3
(Costa Rica) **JA Marín**	**6**	4	**7**
(Czech Republic) S Doseděl	3	**6**	5
(Spain) **G Puentes**	3	**6**	**6**
(Spain) J Alonso	**6**	4	4
WC	(Sweden) **N Kulti**	**6**	**7**
2	(Sweden) T Johansson	3	5

Quarterfinals
(Spain) G Blanco	1	r
WC	(Sweden) **A Vinciguerra**	**6**
(Argentina) M Rodríguez	6^{3}	2
5	(Norway) **C Ruud**	**7^{7}**	**6**
6	(Sweden) M Norman	2	**6**	6^{4}
(Costa Rica) **JA Marín**	**6**	1	**7^{7}**
(Spain) G Puentes	**6**	5	4
WC	(Sweden) **N Kulti**	2	**7**	**6**

Semifinals
WC	(Sweden) **A Vinciguerra**	**6**	**6**
5	(Norway) C Ruud	3	3
(Costa Rica) **JA Marín**	2	**7^{9}**	**6**
WC	(Sweden) N Kulti	**6**	6^{7}	4

Final
WC	(Sweden) A Vinciguerra	4	6^{4}
(Costa Rica) **JA Marín**	**6**	**7^{7}**
