= 2001 Citrix Tennis Championships – Doubles =

Doubles
- 2001 Citrix Tennis Championships

Final
- Champions: (United States) Jan-Michael Gambill (United States) Andy Roddick
- Runners-up: (Japan) Thomas Shimada (South Africa) Myles Wakefield
- Score: 6–3, 6–4

Events
Singles	Doubles
← 2000 ·	Delray Beach Open	· 2002 →

Brian MacPhie and Nenad Zimonjić were the defending champions but did not compete that year.

Jan-Michael Gambill and Andy Roddick won in the final 6–3, 6–4 against Thomas Shimada and Myles Wakefield.

== Seeds ==
1. (Australia) Joshua Eagle / (Australia) Sandon Stolle (quarterfinals)
2. (Netherlands) Paul Haarhuis / (France) Fabrice Santoro (quarterfinals)
3. (South Africa) David Adams / (Argentina) Martín García (semifinals)
4. (Japan) Thomas Shimada / (South Africa) Myles Wakefield (final)

== Draw ==
=== Key ===
- Q = Qualifier
- WC = Wild card
- LL = Lucky loser
- Alt = Alternate
- SE = Special exempt
- PR = Protected ranking
- ITF = ITF entry
- JE = Junior exempt
- w/o = Walkover
- r = Retired
- d = Defaulted
- SR = Special ranking

First round
1	(Australia) J Eagle (Australia) S Stolle	6	7^{7}
WC	(United States) L Jensen (United States) M Jensen	2	6^{2}
(South Africa) M Barnard (Australia) A Kratzmann	6^{5}	2
WC	(United States) J-M Gambill (United States) A Roddick	7^{7}	6
3	(South Africa) D Adams (Argentina) M García	6	7
(India) M Bhupathi (India) L Paes	3	5
(Spain) J Balcells (Ecuador) N Lapentti	3	1	r
WC	(United States) C Franklin (United States) G Oliver	6	2
(Argentina) G Etlis (Czech Republic) C Suk	7^{7}	3	4
Q	(The Bahamas) M Merklein (United States) M Sprengelmeyer	6^{5}	6	6
(Czech Republic) T Cibulec (Czech Republic) L Friedl	6	2	3
4	(Japan) T Shimada (South Africa) M Wakefield	4	6	6
(Argentina) M Hood (Argentina) S Prieto	3	5
(South Africa) C Haggard (United States) J Waite	6	7
(Italy) C Brandi (Argentina) D Orsanic	2	3
2	(Netherlands) P Haarhuis (France) F Santoro	6	6

Quarterfinals
1	(Australia) J Eagle (Australia) S Stolle	6^{5}	5
WC	(United States) J-M Gambill (United States) A Roddick	7^{7}	7
3	(South Africa) D Adams (Argentina) M García	6	1	6
WC	(United States) C Franklin (United States) G Oliver	4	6	3
Q	(The Bahamas) M Merklein (United States) M Sprengelmeyer	6^{5}	7^{7}	4
4	(Japan) T Shimada (South Africa) M Wakefield	7^{7}	6^{3}	6
(South Africa) C Haggard (United States) J Waite	7^{8}	6
2	(Netherlands) P Haarhuis (France) F Santoro	6^{6}	2

Semifinals
WC	(United States) J-M Gambill (United States) A Roddick	6	3	6
3	(South Africa) D Adams (Argentina) M García	2	6	1
4	(Japan) T Shimada (South Africa) M Wakefield	6	6
(South Africa) C Haggard (United States) J Waite	4	4

Final
WC	(United States) J-M Gambill (United States) A Roddick	6	6
4	(Japan) T Shimada (South Africa) M Wakefield	3	4
