= 2001 International Raiffeisen Grand Prix – Doubles =

Doubles
- 2001 International Raiffeisen Grand Prix

Final
- Champions: (Czech Republic) Petr Pála (Czech Republic) David Rikl
- Runners-up: (Brazil) Jaime Oncins (Argentina) Daniel Orsanic
- Score: 6–3, 5–7, 7–5

Events
Singles	Doubles
← 2000 ·	International Raiffeisen Grand Prix	· 2002 →

Mahesh Bhupathi and Andrew Kratzmann were the defending champions but only Kratzmann competed that year with Chris Haggard.

Haggard and Kratzmann lost in the first round to Leoš Friedl and Dominik Hrbatý.

Petr Pála and David Rikl won in the final 6–3, 5–7, 7–5 against Jaime Oncins and Daniel Orsanic.

== Seeds ==
Champion seeds are indicated in bold text while text in italics indicates the round in which those seeds were eliminated.

1. (Czech Republic) **Petr Pála** / (Czech Republic) **David Rikl (champions)**
2. (Brazil) Jaime Oncins / (Argentina) Daniel Orsanic (final)
3. (United States) Bob Bryan / (United States) Mike Bryan (quarterfinals)
4. (South Africa) David Adams / (South Africa) Grant Stafford (first round)

== Draw ==
=== Key ===
- Q = Qualifier
- WC = Wild card
- LL = Lucky loser
- Alt = Alternate
- ITF = ITF entry
- PR = Protected ranking
- SR = Special ranking
- SE = Special exempt
- JE = Junior exempt
- JR = Junior Accelerator Programme entrant
- CO = College Accelerator Programme entrant
- NG = Next Gen Accelerator Program entrant
- w/o = Walkover
- r = Retired
- d = Defaulted

First round
1	(Czech Republic) **P Pála** (Czech Republic) **D Rikl**	**6**	**6**
(South Africa) R Koenig (United States) J Waite	2	4
WC	(Spain) G Blanco (Austria) M Hipfl	4	6^{2}
WC	(Austria) **S Koubek** (Romania) **A Pavel**	**6**	**7^{7}**
4	(South Africa) D Adams (South Africa) G Stafford	6^{10}	1
(Japan) **T Shimada** (South Africa) **M Wakefield**	**7^{12}**	**6**
LL	(Argentina) G Cañas (Chile) N Massú	3	2
(South Africa) **M Barnard** (United States) **J Thomas**	**6**	**6**
Q	(Belgium) C Rochus (Belgium) O Rochus	1	2
(Spain) **T Carbonell** (Netherlands) **J Siemerink**	**6**	**6**
(Czech Republic) M Damm (Czech Republic) C Suk	2	3
3	(United States) **B Bryan** (United States) **M Bryan**	**6**	**6**
(South Africa) C Haggard (Australia) A Kratzmann	**7^{7}**	4	2
(Czech Republic) **L Friedl** (Slovakia) **D Hrbatý**	6^{5}	**6**	**6**
(South Africa) N Godwin (South Africa) J Weir-Smith	3	4
2	(Brazil) **J Oncins** (Argentina) **D Orsanic**	**6**	**6**

Quarterfinals
1	(Czech Republic) **P Pála** (Czech Republic) **D Rikl**	**6**	**7^{7}**
WC	(Austria) S Koubek (Romania) A Pavel	1	6^{3}
(Japan) T Shimada (South Africa) M Wakefield	6^{6}	4
(South Africa) **M Barnard** (United States) **J Thomas**	**7^{8}**	**6**
(Spain) **T Carbonell** (Netherlands) **J Siemerink**	6^{9}	**6**	**6**
3	(United States) B Bryan (United States) M Bryan	**7^{11}**	1	4
(Czech Republic) L Friedl (Slovakia) D Hrbatý	3	**6**	4
2	(Brazil) **J Oncins** (Argentina) **D Orsanic**	**6**	2	**6**

Semifinals
1	(Czech Republic) **P Pála** (Czech Republic) **D Rikl**	**7^{7}**	**7^{7}**
(South Africa) M Barnard (United States) J Thomas	6^{4}	6^{4}
(Spain) T Carbonell (Netherlands) J Siemerink	2^{r}
2	(Brazil) **J Oncins** (Argentina) **D Orsanic**	4

Final
1	(Czech Republic) **P Pála** (Czech Republic) **D Rikl**	**6**	5	**7**
2	(Brazil) J Oncins (Argentina) D Orsanic	3	**7**	5
