= 1998 Investor Swedish Open =

- Date: 6–12 July
- Edition: 51st
- Category: World Series
- Draw: 32S / 16D
- Prize money: $315,000
- Surface: Clay / outdoor
- Location: Båstad, Sweden

Champions

Singles
- (Sweden) Magnus Gustafsson

Doubles
- (Sweden) Magnus Gustafsson / (Sweden) Magnus Larsson
← 1997 ·	Swedish Open	· 1999 →

The 1998 Investor Swedish Open was a men's tennis tournament played on outdoor clay courts in Båstad, Sweden that was part of the World Series of the 1998 ATP Tour. It was the 51st edition of the tournament and was held from 6 July until 12 July 1998. First-seeded Magnus Gustafsson won the singles title.

== Finals ==
=== Singles ===
(Sweden) Magnus Gustafsson defeated (Ukraine) Andriy Medvedev, 6–2, 6–3

- It was Gustafsson 2nd singles title of the year and the 9th of his career.

=== Doubles ===
(Sweden) Magnus Gustafsson / (Sweden) Magnus Larsson defeated (South Africa) Lan Bale / (South Africa) Piet Norval, 6–4, 6–2
