= 2002 International Raiffeisen Grand Prix – Singles =

Singles
- 2002 International Raiffeisen Grand Prix

Final
- Champion: (Ecuador) Nicolás Lapentti
- Runner-up: (Spain) Fernando Vicente
- Score: 7–5, 6–4

Events
Singles	Doubles
- International Raiffeisen Grand Prix

Andrea Gaudenzi was the defending champion but lost in the second round to Jürgen Melzer.

Nicolás Lapentti won in the final 7–5, 6–4 against Fernando Vicente.

== Seeds ==
A champion seed is indicated in bold text while text in italics indicates the round in which that seed was eliminated.

1. (Czech Republic) ~~Jiří Novák~~ (withdrew because of a right wrist injury)
2. (Ecuador) **Nicolás Lapentti (champion)**
3. (Spain) Albert Portas (first round, retired because of a neck problem)
4. (United States) Jan-Michael Gambill (second round)
5. (Austria) Stefan Koubek (second round)
6. (Spain) Albert Montañés (quarterfinals)
7. (Italy) Andrea Gaudenzi (second round)
8. (Slovakia) Dominik Hrbatý (second round)

== Draw ==
Key

- Q = Qualifier
- WC = Wild card
- LL = Lucky loser
- Alt = Alternate
- ITF = ITF entry
- PR = Protected ranking
- SR = Special ranking
- SE = Special exempt
- JE = Junior exempt
- JR = Junior Accelerator Programme entrant
- CO = College Accelerator Programme entrant
- NG = Next Gen Accelerator Program entrant
- w/o = Walkover
- r = Retired
- d = Defaulted

First round
LL	(Brazil) **F Saretta**	**6**	**6**
(Paraguay) R Delgado	2	2
Q	(Sweden) R Söderling	2	3
(France) **A Dupuis**	**6**	**6**
(Austria) **M Hipfl**	**6**	**6**
WC	(Austria) J Ager	2	2
Q	(United States) B Bryan	3	5
5	(Austria) **S Koubek**	**6**	**7**
3	(Spain) A Portas	2	0^{r}
(Spain) **F Vicente**	**6**	3
(France) **J Boutter**	**7**	**6**
(Argentina) M Zabaleta	5	4
(Hungary) **A Sávolt**	**6**	**6**
(Thailand) P Srichaphan	2	3
WC	(Austria) J Knowle	6^{7}	6^{5}
6	(Spain) **A Montañés**	**7^{9}**	**7^{7}**
8	(Slovakia) **D Hrbatý**	2	**6**	**6**
(Russia) N Davydenko	**6**	4	4
(Spain) **D Sánchez**	**6**	**6**
Q	(United States) V Spadea	4	0
Q	(United States) M Russell	4	2
(Belgium) **O Rochus**	**6**	**6**
(Czech Republic) J Vacek	3	**6**	3
4	(United States) **J-M Gambill**	**6**	3	**6**
7	(Italy) **A Gaudenzi**	**7^{7}**	**6**
(Belgium) C Rochus	6^{3}	1
WC	(Austria) **J Melzer**	**6**	**6**
(Armenia) S Sargsian	0	2
(Denmark) K Pless	4	4
(Georgia (country)) **I Labadze**	**6**	**6**
(Slovakia) K Kučera	3	**6**	0
2	(Ecuador) **N Lapentti**	**6**	2	**6**

Second round
LL	(Brazil) **F Saretta**	**6**	**6**
(France) A Dupuis	4	1
(Austria) **M Hipfl**	**6**	**6**
5	(Austria) S Koubek	4	2
(Spain) **F Vicente**	4	**6**	**6**
(France) J Boutter	**6**	2	4
(Hungary) A Sávolt	6^{4}	1^{r}
6	(Spain) **A Montañés**	**7^{7}**	4
8	(Slovakia) D Hrbatý	5	4
(Spain) **D Sánchez**	**7**	**6**
(Belgium) **O Rochus**	**7**	2	**6**
4	(United States) J-M Gambill	5	**6**	4
7	(Italy) A Gaudenzi	3	5
WC	(Austria) **J Melzer**	**6**	**7**
(Georgia (country)) I Labadze	**7**	6^{1}	6^{6}
2	(Ecuador) **N Lapentti**	5	**7^{7}**	**7^{8}**

Quarterfinals
LL	(Brazil) **F Saretta**	**6**	1	**6**
(Austria) M Hipfl	3	**6**	4
(Spain) **F Vicente**	**7^{7}**	**6**
6	(Spain) A Montañés	6^{2}	1
(Spain) D Sánchez	5	0^{r}
(Belgium) **O Rochus**	**7**	4
WC	(Austria) J Melzer	2	**6**	3
2	(Ecuador) **N Lapentti**	**6**	4	**6**

Semifinals
LL	(Brazil) F Saretta	4	2
(Spain) **F Vicente**	**6**	**6**
(Belgium) O Rochus	**6**	2	4
2	(Ecuador) **N Lapentti**	2	**6**	**6**

Final
(Spain) Fernando Vicente	5	4
2	(Ecuador) **Nicolás Lapentti**	**7**	**6**
