= 2003 International Raiffeisen Grand Prix – Singles =

Singles
- 2003 International Raiffeisen Grand Prix

Final
- Champion: (United States) Andy Roddick
- Runner-up: (Russia) Nikolay Davydenko
- Score: 6–3, 6–2

Events
Singles	Doubles
- International Raiffeisen Grand Prix

Nicolás Lapentti was the defending champion but did not compete that year.

Andy Roddick won in the final 6–3, 6–2 against Nikolay Davydenko.

== Seeds ==
A champion seed is indicated in bold text while text in italics indicates the round in which that seed was eliminated.

1. (United States) **Andy Roddick (champion)**
2. (Spain) Albert Costa (second round)
3. (Argentina) ~~Guillermo Coria~~ (withdrew because of a groin muscle injury)
4. (United States) Taylor Dent (first round)
5. (United States) Jan-Michael Gambill (first round)
6. (Russia) Nikolay Davydenko (final)
7. (Slovakia) Karol Kučera (first round)
8. (Spain) David Sánchez (semifinals, retired because of a foot blister)

== Draw ==
Key

- Q = Qualifier
- WC = Wild card
- LL = Lucky loser
- Alt = Alternate
- ITF = ITF entry
- PR = Protected ranking
- SR = Special ranking
- SE = Special exempt
- JE = Junior exempt
- JR = Junior Accelerator Programme entrant
- CO = College Accelerator Programme entrant
- NG = Next Gen Accelerator Program entrant
- w/o = Walkover
- r = Retired
- d = Defaulted

First round
1	(United States) **A Roddick**	**6**	**7^{7}**
(Spain) A Martín	1	6^{5}
Q	(Germany) **P Kohlschreiber**	**6**	0	**6**
WC	(Austria) J Melzer	4	**6**	2
(Denmark) K Carlsen	5	**7**	3
(United States) **B Vahaly**	**7**	5	**6**
WC	(Netherlands) **R Krajicek**	**7**	3	**6**
5	(United States) J-M Gambill	5	**6**	3
4	(United States) T Dent	**6**	6^{3}	4
(Croatia) **M Ančić**	2	**7^{7}**	**6**
(Monaco) **J-R Lisnard**	**6**	**6**
(Switzerland) M Kratochvil	3	4
(Italy) **D Sanguinetti**	**7**	**7^{7}**
(Armenia) S Sargsian	5	6^{5}
WC	(Austria) M Hipfl	1	0
8	(Spain) **D Sánchez**	**6**	**6**
7	(Slovakia) K Kučera	2	1
(Netherlands) **M Verkerk**	**6**	**6**
(Slovakia) **D Hrbatý**	**6**	**7**
(Peru) L Horna	3	5
(Brazil) **F Saretta**	**6**	**6**
(Brazil) A Sá	2	2
Q	(Georgia (country)) **I Labadze**	**6**	4	**6**
LL	(Germany) J Weinzierl	4	**6**	4
6	(Russia) **N Davydenko**	**6**	**6**
(Slovakia) K Beck	4	2
Q	(United States) H Armando	**6**	4	3
(South Korea) **H-T Lee**	4	**6**	**6**
(France) O Mutis	3	1
(France) **A Dupuis**	**6**	**6**
Q	(Serbia and Montenegro) N Zimonjić	**7^{7}**	1	3
2	(Spain) **A Costa**	6^{4}	**6**	**6**

Second round
1	(United States) **A Roddick**	**6**	**6**
Q	(Germany) P Kohlschreiber	3	4
(United States) B Vahaly	2	**6**	3
WC	(Netherlands) **R Krajicek**	**6**	2	**6**
(Croatia) **M Ančić**	**6**	**7**
(Monaco) J-R Lisnard	4	5
(Italy) D Sanguinetti	4	4
8	(Spain) **D Sánchez**	**6**	**6**
(Netherlands) **M Verkerk**	**6**	**7**
(Slovakia) D Hrbatý	4	5
(Brazil) **F Saretta**	**6**	**6**
Q	(Georgia (country)) I Labadze	1	1
6	(Russia) **N Davydenko**	**6**	**6**
(South Korea) H-T Lee	4	3
(France) **A Dupuis**	**6**	2	**6**
2	(Spain) A Costa	4	**6**	2

Quarterfinals
1	(United States) **A Roddick**	**7**	**6**
WC	(Netherlands) R Krajicek	5	1
(Croatia) M Ančić	1	4
8	(Spain) **D Sánchez**	**6**	**6**
(Netherlands) **M Verkerk**	**7^{7}**	**7^{7}**
(Brazil) F Saretta	6^{4}	6^{2}
6	(Russia) **N Davydenko**	**7**	**6**
(France) A Dupuis	5	1

Semifinals
1	(United States) **A Roddick**	**6**	2
8	(Spain) D Sánchez	2	0^{r}
(Netherlands) M Verkerk	5	1
6	(Russia) **N Davydenko**	**7**	**6**

Final
1	(United States) **Andy Roddick**	**6**	**6**
6	(Russia) Nikolay Davydenko	3	2
