= 1997 Swedish Open – Singles =

Singles
- 1997 Swedish Open

Final
- Champion: (Sweden) Magnus Norman
- Runner-up: (Spain) Juan Antonio Marín
- Score: 7–5, 6–2

Details
- Draw: 32 (3WC/4Q)
- Seeds: 8

Events
Singles	Doubles
← 1996 ·	Swedish Open	· 1998 →

Magnus Gustafsson was the defending champion, but lost in the first round to Tomas Nydahl.

Magnus Norman won the title by defeating Juan Antonio Marín 7–5, 6–2 in the final.

== Seeds ==
1. (Sweden) Thomas Johansson (first round)
2. (Sweden) Magnus Gustafsson (first round)
3. (Sweden) Magnus Larsson (quarterfinals, retired)
4. (Sweden) Magnus Norman (champion)
5. (Slovakia) Karol Kučera (semifinals)
6. (Uruguay) Marcelo Filippini (second round)
7. (Sweden) Mikael Tillström (first round)
8. (Belgium) Filip Dewulf (second round)

== Draw ==
=== Key ===
- Q = Qualifier
- WC = Wild card
- LL = Lucky loser
- Alt = Alternate
- SE = Special exempt
- PR = Protected ranking
- ITF = ITF entry
- JE = Junior exempt
- w/o = Walkover
- r = Retired
- d = Defaulted
- SR = Special ranking

=== Finals ===
Semifinals
(Spain) Carlos Costa	5	3
4	(Sweden) Magnus Norman	7	6
5	(Slovakia) Karol Kučera	6^{4}	3
(Spain) Juan Antonio Marín	7^{7}	6

Final
4	(Sweden) Magnus Norman	7	6
(Spain) Juan Antonio Marín	5	2

=== Top half ===
First round
1	(Sweden) T Johansson	6	3	2
Q	(Sweden) M Sarstrand	4	6	6
(Sweden) P Fredriksson	6	7^{7}
(Australia) R Fromberg	2	6^{3}
(Romania) A Pavel	6	3	1
(Spain) C Costa	3	6	6
(Germany) M Craca	6	7
7	(Sweden) M Tillström	4	5
4	(Sweden) M Norman	6	7
(Sweden) N Kulti	4	5
(Romania) A Voinea	4
(France) J Golmard	3^{r}
Q	(Sweden) H Andersson	1	2
(United States) J Tarango	6	6
Q	(Sweden) L Jönsson	6	4	1
6	(Uruguay) M Filippini	4	6	6

Second round
Q	(Sweden) M Sarstrand	4	3
(Sweden) P Fredriksson	6	6
(Spain) C Costa	6	6
(Germany) M Craca	3	4
4	(Sweden) M Norman	6	3	7^{7}
(Romania) A Voinea	3	6	6^{3}
(United States) J Tarango	6	6
6	(Uruguay) M Filippini	3	4

Quarterfinals
(Sweden) P Fredriksson	2	3
(Spain) C Costa	6	6
4	(Sweden) M Norman	6	6
(United States) J Tarango	2	3

Semifinals
(Spain) C Costa	5	3
4	(Sweden) M Norman	7	6

=== Bottom half ===
First round
5	(Slovakia) K Kučera	6	3	6
WC	(Sweden) J Apell	3	6	2
(Netherlands) D van Scheppingen	4	7^{7}	2
(Czech Republic) S Doseděl	6	6^{2}	6
(Spain) MA Górriz	6^{2}	4
(Germany) H Dreekmann	7^{7}	6
Q	(Sweden) N Timfjord	3	2
3	(Sweden) M Larsson	6	6
8/WC	(Belgium) F Dewulf	6	6
(Austria) G Schaller	4	1
(Spain) JA Marín	7^{7}	7
(Germany) B Karbacher	6^{4}	5
(Brazil) F Meligeni	7	6
(Argentina) F Squillari	5	3
WC	(Sweden) T Nydahl	6	2	6
2	(Sweden) M Gustafsson	3	6	1

Second round
5	(Slovakia) K Kučera	7^{7}	6
(Czech Republic) S Doseděl	6^{4}	3
(Germany) H Dreekmann	1	6	0
3	(Sweden) M Larsson	6	4	6
8/WC	(Belgium) F Dewulf	2	6	6^{1}
(Spain) JA Marín	6	1	7^{7}
(Brazil) F Meligeni	6	3	2
WC	(Sweden) T Nydahl	4	6	6

Quarterfinals
5	(Slovakia) K Kučera	6	0
3	(Sweden) M Larsson	4	0^{r}
(Spain) JA Marín	6	6
WC	(Sweden) T Nydahl	2	1

Semifinals
5	(Slovakia) K Kučera	6^{4}	3
(Spain) JA Marín	7^{7}	6
