= 2000 Wideyes Swedish Open – Singles =

Singles
- 2000 Wideyes Swedish Open

Final
- Champion: (Sweden) Magnus Norman
- Runner-up: (Sweden) Andreas Vinciguerra
- Score: 6–1, 7–6^{(8–6)}

Details
- Draw: 32
- Seeds: 8

Events
Singles	Doubles
- Swedish Open

Juan Antonio Marín was the defending champion but lost in the first round to Andreas Vinciguerra.

Magnus Norman won in the final 6–1, 7–6^{(8–6)} against Vinciguerra.

== Seeds ==
A champion seed is indicated in bold text while text in italics indicates the round in which that seed was eliminated.

1. (Sweden) **Magnus Norman (champion)**
2. (Slovakia) Dominik Hrbatý (second round)
3. (Sweden) Andreas Vinciguerra (final)
4. (Argentina) Juan Ignacio Chela (first round)
5. (Spain) Albert Portas (quarterfinals)
6. (United States) Jeff Tarango (quarterfinals)
7. (Sweden) Mikael Tillström (first round)
8. (Australia) Richard Fromberg (first round)

== Draw ==
Key

- Q = Qualifier
- WC = Wild card
- LL = Lucky loser
- Alt = Alternate
- ITF = ITF entry
- PR = Protected ranking
- SR = Special ranking
- SE = Special exempt
- JE = Junior exempt
- JR = Junior Accelerator Programme entrant
- CO = College Accelerator Programme entrant
- NG = Next Gen Accelerator Program entrant
- w/o = Walkover
- r = Retired
- d = Defaulted

First round
1	(Sweden) **M Norman**	**6**	**6**
(Belgium) C Rochus	2	1
(Czech Republic) **J Vaněk**	**6**	**6**
WC	(Spain) G Blanco	3	2
(Chile) **N Massú**	**6**	**6**
Q	(Argentina) H Gumy	3	4
(Czech Republic) **B Ulihrach**	**6**	**6**
8	(Australia) R Fromberg	2	2
4	(Argentina) JI Chela	2	4
Q	(Croatia) **I Ljubičić**	**6**	**6**
(Spain) A Martín	4	3
(Italy) **D Sanguinetti**	**6**	**6**
WC	(Sweden) N Kulti	2	4
WC	(Sweden) **F Jonsson**	**6**	**6**
(Armenia) S Sargsian	3	2
5	(Spain) **A Portas**	**6**	**6**
6	(United States) **J Tarango**	**7**	**7^{7}**
(United States) R Agénor	5	6^{3}
(Norway) **C Ruud**	**6**	**6**
Q	(Germany) T Fleischfresser	2	0
(Italy) **A Gaudenzi**	2	**6**	**6**
Q	(Sweden) N Timfjord	**6**	2	1
(Costa Rica) JA Marín	4	4
3	(Sweden) **A Vinciguerra**	**6**	**6**
7	(Sweden) M Tillström	4	5
(Sweden) **M Gustafsson**	**6**	**6**
Q	(Argentina) **G Cañas**	**6**	**6**
(Czech Republic) T Zíb	4	3
WC	(Sweden) J Johansson	3	r
Q	(Austria) **M Hipfl**	**6**
(France) J Boutter	**6**	2	3
2	(Slovakia) **D Hrbatý**	4	**6**	**6**

Second round
1	(Sweden) **M Norman**	**6**	**6**
(Czech Republic) J Vaněk	2	2
(Chile) **N Massú**	**6**	**6**
(Czech Republic) B Ulihrach	2	4
Q	(Croatia) **I Ljubičić**	3	**6**	**7**
(Italy) D Sanguinetti	**6**	3	5
WC	(Sweden) F Jonsson	6^{5}	2
5	(Spain) **A Portas**	**7^{7}**	**6**
6	(United States) **J Tarango**	**6**	**6**
(Norway) C Ruud	3	4
(Italy) **A Gaudenzi**	2	6^{2}
3	(Sweden) A Vinciguerra	**6**	**7^{7}**
(Sweden) **M Gustafsson**	**6**	3	**6**
Q	(Argentina) G Cañas	3	**6**	4
Q	(Austria) **M Hipfl**	**6**	**6**
2	(Slovakia) D Hrbatý	4	4

Quarterfinals
1	(Sweden) **M Norman**	**6**	**6**
(Chile) N Massú	2	4
Q	(Croatia) **I Ljubičić**	**7**	**6**
5	(Spain) A Portas	5	1
6	(United States) J Tarango	1	2
3	(Sweden) **A Vinciguerra**	**6**	**6**
(Sweden) M Gustafsson	**7^{7}**	1	5
Q	(Austria) **M Hipfl**	6^{4}	**6**	**7**

Semifinals
1	(Sweden) **M Norman**	**6**	**7**
Q	(Croatia) I Ljubičić	2	5
3	(Sweden) **A Vinciguerra**	**6**	6^{2}	**7^{8}**
Q	(Austria) M Hipfl	2	**7^{7}**	6^{6}

Final
1	(Sweden) **M Norman**	**6**	**7^{8}**
3	(Sweden) A Vinciguerra	1	6^{6}
