= 1999 Investor Swedish Open =

- Date: 5–11 July
- Edition: 52nd
- Category: World Series
- Draw: 32S / 16D
- Prize money: $325,000
- Surface: Clay / outdoor
- Location: Båstad, Sweden

Champions

Singles
- (Costa Rica) Juan Antonio Marín

Doubles
- (South Africa) David Adams / (United States) Jeff Tarango
← 1998 ·	Swedish Open	· 2000 →

The 1999 Investor Swedish Open was a men's tennis tournament played on outdoor clay courts in Båstad, Sweden that was part of the World Series of the 1999 ATP Tour. It was the 52nd edition of the tournament and was held from 5 July until 11 July 1999. Unseeded Juan Antonio Marín won the singles titles.

== Finals ==
=== Singles ===
(Costa Rica) Juan Antonio Marín defeated (Sweden) Andreas Vinciguerra, 6–4, 7–6^{(7–4)}

- It was Marín's only singles title of his career.

=== Doubles ===
(South Africa) David Adams / (United States) Jeff Tarango defeated (Sweden) Nicklas Kulti / (Sweden) Mikael Tillström, 7–6^{(8–6)}, 6–4
