= 2001 Citrix Tennis Championships – Singles =

Singles
- 2001 Citrix Tennis Championships

Final
- Champion: (United States) Jan-Michael Gambill
- Runner-up: (Belgium) Xavier Malisse
- Score: 7–5, 6–4

Details
- Draw: 32
- Seeds: 8

Events
Singles	Doubles
← 2000 ·	Delray Beach Open	· 2002 →

Stefan Koubek was the defending champion but lost in the first round to Carlos Moyá.

Jan-Michael Gambill won in the final 7–5, 6–4 against Xavier Malisse.

== Seeds ==
1. (Australia) Patrick Rafter (quarterfinals)
2. (Ecuador) Nicolás Lapentti (second round)
3. (Spain) Carlos Moyá (second round)
4. (United States) Jan-Michael Gambill (champion)
5. (Argentina) Gastón Gaudio (first round)
6. (Spain) Álex Calatrava (second round)
7. (Zimbabwe) ~~Byron Black~~ (withdrew)
8. (France) Fabrice Santoro (quarterfinals)

== Draw ==
=== Key ===
- Q = Qualifier
- WC = Wild card
- LL = Lucky loser
- Alt = Alternate
- ITF = ITF entry
- PR = Protected ranking
- SR = Special ranking
- SE = Special exempt
- JE = Junior exempt
- JR = Junior Accelerator Programme entrant
- CO = College Accelerator Programme entrant
- NG = Next Gen Accelerator Program entrant
- w/o = Walkover
- r = Retired
- d = Defaulted

=== Finals ===
Semifinals
(Australia) Wayne Arthurs	3	7^{7}	6^{8}
4	(United States) Jan-Michael Gambill	6	6^{3}	7^{10}
Q	(Netherlands) Peter Wessels	5	4
SE	(Belgium) Xavier Malisse	7	6

Final
4	(United States) Jan-Michael Gambill	7	6
SE	(Belgium) Xavier Malisse	5	4

=== Top half ===
First round
1	(Australia) P Rafter	5	6	7
(Sweden) M Gustafsson	7	3	5
(Czech Republic) J Vaněk	6	6^{4}	6
WC	(United States) A Roddick	4	7^{7}	4
(Australia) W Arthurs	6	6^{8}	6
Q	(France) C Saulnier	2	7^{10}	3
(Germany) M Hantschk	2	7	6
5	(Argentina) G Gaudio	6	5	1
4	(United States) J-M Gambill	6	6
(Spain) S Bruguera	3	4
(United Kingdom) G Rusedski	6	6
WC	(United States) T Dent	2	2
(Argentina) A Calleri	4	6	5
(United States) C Woodruff	6	4	7
WC	(United States) V Spadea	5	3
LL	(Germany) M Goellner	7	6

Second round
1	(Australia) P Rafter	6	7^{7}
(Czech Republic) J Vaněk	3	6^{3}
(Australia) W Arthurs	7	6
(Germany) M Hantschk	5	2
4	(United States) J-M Gambill	w/o
(United Kingdom) G Rusedski
(United States) C Woodruff	6	6
LL	(Germany) M Goellner	2	3

Quarterfinals
1	(Australia) P Rafter	1	6^{0}
(Australia) W Arthurs	6	7^{7}
4	(United States) J-M Gambill	5	7^{11}	6
(United States) C Woodruff	7	6^{9}	4

Semifinals
(Australia) W Arthurs	3	7^{7}	6^{8}
4	(United States) J-M Gambill	6	6^{3}	7^{10}

=== Bottom half ===
First round
6	(Spain) Á Calatrava	6	7^{7}
(Russia) A Stoliarov	1	6^{3}
Q	(Netherlands) P Wessels	6	6
(Australia) J Stoltenberg	4	3
Q	(Netherlands) E Kempes	7^{7}	7^{7}
(Spain) J Balcells	6^{2}	6^{5}
(Austria) S Koubek	4	4
3	(Spain) C Moyá	6	6
8	(France) F Santoro	6	6
(Morocco) K Alami	3	4
(Belgium) C Rochus	4	5
Q	(Brazil) F Saretta	6	7
(Italy) D Sanguinetti	3	6^{9}
SE	(Belgium) X Malisse	6	7^{11}
SE	(Spain) G Blanco	1	1
2	(Ecuador) N Lapentti	6	6

Second round
6	(Spain) Á Calatrava	6^{5}	6	6^{2}
Q	(Netherlands) P Wessels	7^{7}	4	7^{7}
Q	(Netherlands) E Kempes	6	6
3	(Spain) C Moyá	2	3
8	(France) F Santoro	6	6
Q	(Brazil) F Saretta	4	3
SE	(Belgium) X Malisse	6	6
2	(Ecuador) N Lapentti	3	4

Quarterfinals
Q	(Netherlands) P Wessels	7^{7}	7^{7}
Q	(Netherlands) E Kempes	6^{4}	6^{2}
8	(France) F Santoro	4	6^{5}
SE	(Belgium) X Malisse	6	7^{7}

Semifinals
Q	(Netherlands) P Wessels	5	4
SE	(Belgium) X Malisse	7	6
