= 2000 Citrix Tennis Championships – Singles =

Singles
- 2000 Citrix Tennis Championships

Final
- Champion: (Austria) Stefan Koubek
- Runner-up: (Spain) Álex Calatrava
- Score: 6–1, 4–6, 6–4

Details
- Draw: 32
- Seeds: 8

Events
Singles	Doubles
← 1999 ·	Delray Beach Open	· 2001 →

Stefan Koubek defeated Álex Calatrava 6–1, 4–6, 6–4 to win the 2000 Delray Beach International Tennis Championships.

== Seeds ==
1. (Australia) Patrick Rafter (quarterfinals)
2. (Morocco) Karim Alami (first round)
3. n/a
4. (Argentina) Mariano Zabaleta (first round)
5. (United States) Chris Woodruff (quarterfinals)
6. (Austria) Stefan Koubek (champion)
7. (United States) Michael Chang (first round)
8. (Spain) Francisco Clavet (second round)

== Draw ==
=== Key ===
- Q = Qualifier
- WC = Wild card
- LL = Lucky loser
- Alt = Alternate
- ITF = ITF entry
- PR = Protected ranking
- SR = Special ranking
- SE = Special exempt
- JE = Junior exempt
- JR = Junior Accelerator Programme entrant
- CO = College Accelerator Programme entrant
- NG = Next Gen Accelerator Program entrant
- w/o = Walkover
- r = Retired
- d = Defaulted

=== Finals ===
Semifinals
(United States) Paul Goldstein	0	7	6^{3}
Q	(Spain) Álex Calatrava	6	5	7^{7}
6	(Austria) Stefan Koubek	6^{6}	6	6
(Australia) Richard Fromberg	7^{8}	3	2

Final
Q	(Spain) Álex Calatrava	1	6	4
6	(Austria) Stefan Koubek	6	4	6

=== Top half ===
First round
1	(Australia) P Rafter	6	7^{7}
(Argentina) H Gumy	2	6^{5}
(Thailand) P Srichaphan	6^{0}	6	3
(Austria) M Hipfl	7^{7}	4	6
(United States) P Goldstein	6	6
(Romania) A Pavel	3	4
(Australia) M Woodforde	2	4
8	(Spain) F Clavet	6	6
4	(Argentina) M Zabaleta	6^{4}	2
Q	(Spain) Á Calatrava	7^{7}	6
(Italy) A Gaudenzi	0	6	6^{5}
Q	(United States) M Bryan	6	4	7^{7}
WC	(United States) A Roddick	6^{6}	5
(Italy) L Tieleman	7^{8}	7
Q	(Switzerland) M Kratochvil	0	7^{7}	4
5	(United States) C Woodruff	6	6^{5}	6

Second round
1	(Australia) P Rafter	6	7
(Austria) M Hipfl	2	5
(United States) P Goldstein	6	6
8	(Spain) F Clavet	4	4
Q	(Spain) Á Calatrava	6	6
Q	(United States) M Bryan	3	4
(Italy) L Tieleman	1	4
5	(United States) C Woodruff	6	6

Quarterfinals
1	(Australia) P Rafter	6	1	2
(United States) P Goldstein	4	6	6
Q	(Spain) Á Calatrava	6^{7}	6	6
5	(United States) C Woodruff	7^{9}	3	2

Semifinals
(United States) P Goldstein	0	7	6^{3}
Q	(Spain) Á Calatrava	6	5	7^{7}

=== Bottom half ===
First round
6	(Austria) S Koubek	6	7^{7}
(Zimbabwe) B Black	4	6^{4}
(United States) J Gambill	6	3
(Spain) J Alonso	4	0^{r}
WC	(Belgium) X Malisse	6	2	6
(Netherlands) J van Lottum	0	6	1
(Brazil) A Sá	6	6
LL	(Venezuela) J Szymanski	3	1
WC/7	(United States) M Chang	6^{6}	4
(Australia) A Ilie	7^{8}	6
(Australia) R Fromberg	6	6
WC	(United States) J Stark	4	2
(Philippines) C Mamiit	3	6	6
(Belarus) M Mirnyi	6	3	2
(United States) J Gimelstob	6	2	7^{7}
2	(Morocco) K Alami	4	6	6^{2}

Second round
6	(Austria) S Koubek	6	7^{9}
(United States) J Gambill	1	6^{7}
WC	(Belgium) X Malisse	6	2	6^{8}
(Brazil) A Sá	3	6	7^{10}
(Australia) A Ilie	7^{7}	1	4
(Australia) R Fromberg	6^{2}	6	6
(Philippines) C Mamiit	6	6^{3}	4
(United States) J Gimelstob	1	7^{7}	6

Quarterfinals
6	(Austria) S Koubek	6	1	6
(Brazil) A Sá	1	6	1
(Australia) R Fromberg	4	7^{7}	6
(United States) J Gimelstob	6	6^{3}	2

Semifinals
6	(Austria) S Koubek	6^{6}	6	6
(Australia) R Fromberg	7^{8}	3	2
