= 2003 International Raiffeisen Grand Prix =

- Date: 19–25 May
- Edition: 23rd
- Category: International Series
- Draw: 32S / 16D
- Surface: Clay / outdoor
- Location: Sankt Pölten, Austria

Champions

Singles
- (United States) Andy Roddick

Doubles
- (Sweden) Simon Aspelin / (Italy) Massimo Bertolini
← 2002 ·	International Raiffeisen Grand Prix	· 2004 →

The 2003 International Raiffeisen Grand Prix was a men's tennis tournament played on outdoor clay courts in Sankt Pölten, Austria and was part of the International Series of the 2003 ATP Tour. It was the 23rd edition of the tournament and was held from 19 May through 25 May 2003. First-seeded Andy Roddick won the singles title.

== Finals ==
=== Singles ===
(United States) Andy Roddick defeated (Russia) Nikolay Davydenko 6–3, 6–2

- It was Roddick's 1st singles title of the year and the 6th of his career.

=== Doubles ===
(Sweden) Simon Aspelin / (Italy) Massimo Bertolini defeated (Armenia) Sargis Sargsian / (Serbia and Montenegro) Nenad Zimonjić 6–4, 6–7^{(8–10)}, 6–3

- It was Aspelin's 1st title of the year and the 2nd of his career. It was Bertolini's 1st title of the year and the 1st of his career.
