= 2001 Citrix Tennis Championships =

- Date: March 5–11
- Edition: 9th
- Category: International Series
- Draw: 32S / 16D
- Prize money: $325,000
- Surface: Hard / outdoor
- Location: Delray Beach, Florida, U.S.
- Venue: Delray Beach Tennis Center

Champions

Singles
- (United States) Jan-Michael Gambill

Doubles
- (United States) Jan-Michael Gambill / (United States) Andy Roddick
← 2000 ·	Delray Beach Open	· 2002 →

The 2001 Citrix Tennis Championships was a men's tennis tournament played on outdoor hard courts at the Delray Beach Tennis Center in Delray Beach, Florida in the United States and was part of the International Series of the 2001 ATP Tour. It was the ninth edition of the tournament and ran from March 5 through March 11, 2001. Fourth-seeded Jan-Michael Gambill won the singles title.

== Finals ==
=== Singles ===
(United States) Jan-Michael Gambill defeated (Belgium) Xavier Malisse 7–5, 6–4

- It was Gambill's 1st singles title of the year and the 2nd of his career.

=== Doubles ===
(United States) Jan-Michael Gambill / (United States) Andy Roddick defeated (Japan) Thomas Shimada / (South Africa) Myles Wakefield 6–3, 6–4

- It was Gambill's 2nd title of the year and the 4th of his career. It was Roddick's 1st title of the year and the 1st of his career.
