= Johan Settergren =

Swedish tennis player

- Full name: Johan Settergren
- Country (sports): Sweden
- Born: 22 April 1978 (age 47); Halmstad, Sweden
- Height: 6 ft 1 in (185 cm)
- Turned pro: 1997
- Retired: 2005
- Plays: Right-handed
- Prize money: $140,242

Singles
- Career record: 2–4
- Career titles: 0
- Highest ranking: No. 130 (29 October 2001)

Grand Slam singles results
- Australian Open: Q1 (2000, 2001)
- French Open: Q3 (2001)
- Wimbledon: Q2 (2002)
- US Open: Q1 (2002)

Doubles
- Career record: 1–0
- Career titles: 0
- Highest ranking: No. 408 (19 February 2001)
- Last updated on: 11 February 2022.

Johan Settergren (born 22 April 1978) is a former professional tennis player from Sweden.

Settergren, who is from Halmstad, performed well in the juniors events at the 1996 Australian Open. A quarter-finalist in the boys' singles, he also reached the boys' doubles semi-finals with Per Thornadsson and en route beat the Bryan brothers as well as Lleyton Hewitt and his partner. The following year he turned professional.

In 2001, he made his first main draw appearances at ATP Tour level, in the singles at tournaments in Copenhagen and Bastad. He also played at the 2002 Mercedes Cup in Stuttgart and the 2004 If Stockholm Open. His only doubles appearance on the ATP Tour was at Stockholm in 2004. He and partner Robin Söderling accounted for fourth seeds Martín García and Sebastián Prieto in the first round, but had to concede a walkover in their next match. He won two Challenger titles, both in doubles, the first at Grenoble in 2001 when he defeated Ivan Ljubičić in the final. His Challenger career also included wins over Mikhail Youzhny, Paradorn Srichaphan, Mario Ančić, Nikolay Davydenko and most notably Novak Djokovic, at a qualifier in Sarajevo. He retired at the end of the 2005 season.

== ATP Challenger and ITF Futures finals ==
=== Singles: 21 (14–7) ===
Legend ATP Challenger (2–2) ITF Futures (12–5)	Finals by surface Hard (4–1) Clay (5–4) Grass (0–0) Carpet (5–2)

Result	W–L	Date	Tournament	Tier	Surface	Opponent	Score
Win	1–0	Mar 1998	Germany F1, Oberhaching	Futures	Carpet	(Germany) Markus Menzler	6–3, 6–3
Win	2–0	Jul 1998	Denmark F3, Svendborg	Futures	Clay	(Germany) Axel Pretzsch	7–5, 6–1
Loss	2–1	May 1999	Germany F3, Neckarau	Futures	Clay	(Germany) Alexander Popp	2–6, 1–6
Loss	2–2	May 1999	Germany F4, Villinger	Futures	Clay	(Croatia) Zeljko Krajan	4–6, 1–6
Win	3–2	Jun 1999	Finland F2, Helsinki	Futures	Clay	(Finland) Janne Ojala	6–2, 6–1
Loss	3–3	Aug 1999	Belgium F2, Brussels	Futures	Clay	(Germany) Jan Weinzierl	6–7, 1–6
Win	4–3	Sep 1999	Norway F1, Oslo	Futures	Carpet	(Sweden) Bjorn Rehnquist	6–3, 6–2
Loss	4–4	Mar 2000	France F7, Poitiers	Futures	Carpet	(Austria) Julian Knowle	3–6, 3–6
Loss	4–5	Aug 2000	Germany F10, Berlin	Futures	Clay	(Germany) Simon Greul	6–7^{(8–10)}, 3–6
Win	5–5	Aug 2000	Germany F11, Berlin	Futures	Clay	(Spain) Carlos Cuadrado	6–3, 6–1
Win	6–5	Sep 2000	Norway F1, Oslo	Futures	Carpet	(Sweden) Henrik Andersson	7–6^{(7–3)}, 7–5
Win	7–5	Sep 2000	Sweden F2, Gothenburg	Futures	Carpet	(Sweden) Kalle Flygt	5–7, 7–5, 6–1
Loss	7–6	Nov 2000	Aachen, Germany	Challenger	Carpet	(Germany) Rainer Schuettler	6–7^{(5–7)}, 6–1, 1–6
Loss	7–7	Nov 2000	Brest, France	Challenger	Hard	(Switzerland) Michel Kratochvil	6–3, 4–6, 6–7^{(2–7)}
Win	8–7	Jun 2001	Germany F4, Villinger	Futures	Clay	(Belgium) Christophe Van Garsse	7–5, 6–3
Win	9–7	Oct 2001	Grenoble, France	Challenger	Hard	(Croatia) Ivan Ljubicic	5–7, 7–6^{(7–4)}, 7–5
Win	10–7	May 2003	Budapest, Hungary	Challenger	Clay	(Serbia and Montenegro) Boris Pashanski	7–5, 6–4
Win	11–7	Sep 2004	Sweden F2, Gothenburg	Futures	Hard	(Italy) Stefano Ianni	5–0 ret.
Win	12–7	Sep 2005	Sweden F1, Gothenburg	Futures	Hard	(Sweden) Rickard Holmstrom	7–5, 6–2
Win	13–7	Sep 2005	Sweden F2, Gothenburg	Futures	Hard	(Denmark) Frederik Nielsen	6–4, 6–4
Win	14–7	Oct 2005	Sweden F3, Falun	Futures	Carpet	(Sweden) Carl-Henrik Hansen	6–2, 6–4

=== Doubles: 10 (6–4) ===
Legend ATP Challenger (0–0) ITF Futures (6–4)	Finals by surface Hard (1–1) Clay (4–2) Grass (0–0) Carpet (1–1)

Result	W–L	Date	Tournament	Tier	Surface	Partner	Opponents	Score
Win	1–0	Aug 1999	Belgium F1, Jupille-sur-Meuse	Futures	Clay	(Sweden) Henrik Andersson	(Australia) Stephen Huss (Australia) Lee Pearson	6–4, 7–5
Win	2–0	Aug 1999	Belgium F2, Brussels	Futures	Clay	(Sweden) Henrik Andersson	(Argentina) Daniel Caracciolo (Argentina) Fernando Las Heras	7–5, 6–1
Loss	2–1	Sep 1999	Norway F1, Oslo	Futures	Carpet	(Sweden) Henrik Andersson	(United States) Mitty Arnold (United States) Thomas Blake	2–6, 6–7
Loss	2–2	May 2000	Germany F2, Esslingen	Futures	Clay	(Netherlands) Melle Van Gemerden	(Lebanon) Ali Hamadeh (Lebanon) Jicham Zaatini	4–6, 1–6
Loss	2–3	Jun 2000	Germany F6, Villinger	Futures	Clay	(Netherlands) Melle Van Gemerden	(Belgium) Kris Goossens (Romania) Ionut Moldovan	6–7^{(6–8)}, 3–6
Win	3–3	Aug 2000	Germany F11, Berlin	Futures	Clay	(Sweden) Henrik Andersson	(Belgium) Wim Neefs (Netherlands) Djalmar Sistermans	6–3, 5–7, 7–5
Win	4–3	Sep 2000	Norway F1, Oslo	Futures	Carpet	(Sweden) Henrik Andersson	(Germany) Andreas Tattermusch (Germany) Ulrich Tippenhauer	6–3, 7–6^{(7–2)}
Loss	4–4	Oct 2000	France F23, La Roche Sur Yon	Futures	Hard	(Netherlands) Melle Van Gemerden	(Belgium) Wim Neefs (Slovakia) Martin Hromec	3–6, 6–1, 6–7^{(8–10)}
Win	5–4	Jun 2001	Germany F4, Villinger	Futures	Clay	(Netherlands) Melle Van Gemerden	(Germany) Frank Moser (Germany) Bernard Parun	6–4, 6–4
Win	6–4	Sep 2005	Sweden F2, Gothenburg	Futures	Hard	(Sweden) Ervin Eleskovic	(Sweden) Rickard Holmstrom (Sweden) Christian Johansson	7–5, 6–7^{(5–7)}, 7–6^{(7–5)}
