= 2003 International Raiffeisen Grand Prix – Doubles =

Doubles
- 2003 International Raiffeisen Grand Prix

Final
- Champions: (Sweden) Simon Aspelin (Italy) Massimo Bertolini
- Runners-up: (Armenia) Sargis Sargsian (Serbia and Montenegro) Nenad Zimonjić
- Score: 6–4, 6–7^{(8–10)}, 6–3

Events
Singles	Doubles
← 2002 ·	International Raiffeisen Grand Prix	· 2004 →

Petr Pála and David Rikl were the defending champions but only Pála competed that year with David Adams.

Adams and Pála lost in the quarterfinals to Sargis Sargsian and Nenad Zimonjić.

Simon Aspelin and Massimo Bertolini won in the final 6–4, 6–7^{(8–10)}, 6–3 against Sargsian and Zimonjić.

== Seeds ==
1. (Czech Republic) Tomáš Cibulec / (Czech Republic) Pavel Vízner (semifinals)
2. (South Africa) David Adams / (Czech Republic) Petr Pála (quarterfinals)
3. (Argentina) Mariano Hood / (Argentina) Martín Rodríguez (semifinals)
4. (United States) Scott Humphries / (The Bahamas) Mark Merklein (first round)

== Draw ==
=== Key ===
- Q = Qualifier
- WC = Wild card
- LL = Lucky loser
- Alt = Alternate
- SE = Special exempt
- PR = Protected ranking
- ITF = ITF entry
- JE = Junior exempt
- w/o = Walkover
- r = Retired
- d = Defaulted
- SR = Special ranking

First round
1	(Czech Republic) T Cibulec (Czech Republic) P Vízner	7^{7}	6
WC	(Georgia (country)) I Labadze (Austria) J Melzer	6^{5}	3
(Croatia) M Ančić (United States) J-M Gambill	7	5	6
(United States) D Bowen (Australia) A Fisher	5	7	4
4	(United States) S Humphries (The Bahamas) M Merklein	2	6	4
(Australia) N Healey (Australia) J Kerr	6	4	6
(Sweden) S Aspelin (Italy) M Bertolini	6	6
(Spain) A Martín (Japan) T Shimada	1	4
(United States) A Roddick (United States) B Vahaly	6	6
(Slovakia) K Beck (Czech Republic) D Škoch	1	4
(South Korea) H-T Lee (Brazil) F Saretta	5	7^{7}	2
3	(Argentina) M Hood (Argentina) M Rodríguez	7	6^{3}	6
WC	(Netherlands) R Krajicek (Netherlands) M Verkerk	6	3	2
(Armenia) S Sargsian (Serbia and Montenegro) N Zimonjić	2	6	6
(Slovakia) D Hrbatý (Brazil) A Sá	2	3
2	(South Africa) D Adams (Czech Republic) P Pála	6	6

Quarterfinals
1	(Czech Republic) T Cibulec (Czech Republic) L Friedl	6	4	6
(Croatia) M Ančić (United States) J-M Gambill	4	6	1
(Australia) N Healey (Australia) J Kerr	3	6^{5}
(Sweden) S Aspelin (Italy) M Bertolini	6	7^{7}
(United States) A Roddick (United States) B Vahaly	6	6^{5}	3
3	(Argentina) M Hood (Argentina) M Rodríguez	3	7^{7}	6
(Armenia) S Sargsian (Serbia and Montenegro) N Zimonjić	4	6	7^{7}
2	(South Africa) D Adams (Czech Republic) P Pála	6	2	6^{5}

Semifinals
1	(Czech Republic) T Cibulec (Czech Republic) L Friedl	6	6^{5}	3
(Sweden) S Aspelin (Italy) M Bertolini	3	7^{7}	6
3	(Argentina) M Hood (Argentina) M Rodríguez	5	7^{7}	3
(Armenia) S Sargsian (Serbia and Montenegro) N Zimonjić	7	6^{4}	6

Final
(Sweden) S Aspelin (Italy) M Bertolini	6	6^{8}	6
(Armenia) S Sargsian (Serbia and Montenegro) N Zimonjić	4	7^{10}	3
