= 2002 International Raiffeisen Grand Prix – Doubles =

Doubles
- 2002 International Raiffeisen Grand Prix

Final
- Champions: (Czech Republic) Petr Pála (Czech Republic) David Rikl
- Runners-up: (United States) Mike Bryan (Australia) Michael Hill
- Score: 7–5, 6–4

Events
Singles	Doubles
← 2001 ·	International Raiffeisen Grand Prix	· 2003 →

Petr Pála and David Rikl were the defending champions and won in the final 7–5, 6–4 against Mike Bryan and Michael Hill.

== Seeds ==
Champion seeds are indicated in bold text while text in italics indicates the round in which those seeds were eliminated.

1. (Czech Republic) **Petr Pála** / (Czech Republic) **David Rikl (champions)**
2. (United States) Mike Bryan / (Australia) Michael Hill (final)
3. (Sweden) Simon Aspelin / (Australia) Andrew Kratzmann (semifinals)
4. (South Africa) David Adams / (Russia) Andrei Olhovskiy (quarterfinals)

== Draw ==
=== Key ===
- Q = Qualifier
- WC = Wild card
- LL = Lucky loser
- Alt = Alternate
- SE = Special exempt
- PR = Protected ranking
- ITF = ITF entry
- JE = Junior exempt
- w/o = Walkover
- r = Retired
- d = Defaulted
- SR = Special ranking

First round
1	(Czech Republic) **P Pála** (Czech Republic) **D Rikl**	**6**	**6**
(South Africa) M Barnard (South Africa) J-L de Jager	3	4
ALT	(Belgium) **C Rochus** (Belgium) **O Rochus**	1	**7^{7}**	**[10]**
(United States) D Bowen (Czech Republic) T Cibulec	**6**	6^{4}	[8]
3	(Sweden) **S Aspelin** (Australia) **A Kratzmann**	**6**	**6**
(United States) J-M Gambill (United States) J Tarango	2	3
(South Africa) **C Haggard** (South Africa) **M Wakefield**	**7**	**6**
(North Macedonia) A Kitinov (Belgium) T Vanhoudt	5	1
(Czech Republic) L Friedl (Czech Republic) P Luxa	**6**	4	[5]
(South Africa) **R Koenig** (Japan) **T Shimada**	4	**6**	**[10]**
WC	(Austria) J Knowle (Austria) J Melzer	3	0
4	(South Africa) **D Adams** (Russia) **A Olhovskiy**	**6**	**6**
WC	(Austria) M Hipfl (Austria) S Koubek	**6**	3	[3]
(Italy) **A Gaudenzi** (Ecuador) **N Lapentti**	4	**6**	**[10]**
WC	(Austria) O Marach (Austria) L Pampoulov	1	2
2	(United States) **M Bryan** (Australia) **M Hill**	**6**	**6**

Quarterfinals
1	(Czech Republic) **P Pála** (Czech Republic) **D Rikl**	5	**7**	**[10]**
ALT	(Belgium) C Rochus (Belgium) O Rochus	**7**	5	[7]
3	(Sweden) **S Aspelin** (Australia) **A Kratzmann**	**6**	**7**
(South Africa) C Haggard (South Africa) M Wakefield	4	5
(South Africa) **R Koenig** (Japan) **T Shimada**	4	**7^{7}**	**[10]**
4	(South Africa) D Adams (Russia) A Olhovskiy	**6**	6^{2}	[8]
(Italy) A Gaudenzi (Ecuador) N Lapentti	3	5
2	(United States) **M Bryan** (Australia) **M Hill**	**6**	**7**

Semifinals
1	(Czech Republic) **P Pála** (Czech Republic) **D Rikl**	**6**	**6**
3	(Sweden) S Aspelin (Australia) A Kratzmann	4	4
(South Africa) R Koenig (Japan) T Shimada	4	5
2	(United States) **M Bryan** (Australia) **M Hill**	**6**	**7**

Final
1	(Czech Republic) **P Pála** (Czech Republic) **D Rikl**	**7**	**6**
2	(United States) M Bryan (Australia) M Hill	5	4
