= Björn Rehnquist =

Swedish tennis player (born 1978)

- Country (sports): Sweden
- Born: January 5, 1978 (age 47) Borås, Sweden
- Height: 1.75 m (5 ft 9 in)
- Turned pro: 1997
- Retired: 2010
- Plays: Right-handed (two-handed backhand)
- Prize money: $363,078

Singles
- Career record: 4–11
- Career titles: 0
- Highest ranking: No. 146 (9 December 2002)

Grand Slam singles results
- Australian Open: 1R (2006, 2009)
- French Open: Q2 (2003, 2009)
- Wimbledon: Q2 (2002, 2008)
- US Open: 1R (2002)

Doubles
- Career record: 0–2
- Career titles: 0
- Highest ranking: No. 345 (22 September 2003)
- Last updated on: May 29, 2022.

Björn Rehnquist (born January 5, 1978, in Borås, Sweden) is a professional Swedish tennis player.

== Tennis career ==
=== Juniors ===
Rehnquist had an outstanding junior career, winning the Australian Open Boys' Singles in 1996 and reaching as high as No. 3 in the world in singles the same year (and No. 7 in doubles).

== Junior Grand Slam finals ==
=== Singles: 2 (1 title, 1 runner-up) ===
Result	Year	Tournament	Surface	Opponent	Score
Win	1996	Australian Open	Hard	(Sweden) Mathias Hellström	2–6, 6–2, 7–5
Loss	1996	French Open	Clay	(Spain) Alberto Martín	3–6, 6–7

Australian Open: W (1996)
French Open: F (1996)
Wimbledon: 3R (1995)
US Open: QF (1994)

=== Pro tour ===
The Swede competed in the 2006 Australian Open, losing to 20th seed Radek Štěpánek 6–1, 6–2, 6–2, and at the 2009 Australian Open, but lost in the first round 6–0, 6–2, 6–2 to eventual semi-finalist Andy Roddick.

Rehnquist won 5 Challenger titles in his career.

== ATP Challenger and ITF Futures finals ==
=== Singles: 15 (8–7) ===
Legend ATP Challenger (5–2) ITF Futures (3–5)	Finals by surface Hard (5–4) Clay (1–2) Grass (1–0) Carpet (0–1)

Result	W–L	Date	Tournament	Tier	Surface	Opponent	Score
Loss	0–1	Jun 1999	Finland F1, Oulu	Futures	Clay	(Sweden) Johan Örtegren	4–6, 6–4, 3–6
Loss	0–2	Sep 1999	Norway F1, Oslo	Futures	Carpet	(Sweden) Johan Settergren	3–6, 2–6
Win	1–2	May 2000	USA F11, Tampa	Futures	Clay	(Bosnia and Herzegovina) Kristian Capalik	6–7^{(2–7)}, 7–5, 6–1
Win	2–2	Mar 2001	New Zealand F1, Ashburton	Futures	Hard	(United States) Chris Magyary	6–2, 5–7, 6–2
Loss	2–3	Mar 2001	New Zealand F2, Christchurch	Futures	Hard	(Greece) Vasilis Mazarakis	0–6, 3–6
Win	3–3	Mar 2001	Hamilton, New Zealand	Challenger	Hard	(United Kingdom) Martin Lee	3–6, 6–2, 6–0
Loss	3–4	Apr 2001	Great Britain F3, Bournemouth	Futures	Clay	(Australia) Todd Larkham	2–6, 0–6
Loss	3–5	Oct 2002	Burbank, United States	Challenger	Hard	(United States) Robby Ginepri	6–7^{(6–8)}, 1–6
Win	4–5	Apr 2003	Greece F2, Kalamata	Futures	Hard	(Czech Republic) Petr Kralert	6–0, 6–1
Win	5–5	Jun 2003	Atlantic City, United States	Challenger	Hard	(United States) Jeff Salzenstein	6–4, 6–4
Loss	5–6	Jun 2004	Tallahassee, United States	Challenger	Hard	(United States) Cecil Mamiit	4–6, 6–4, 5–7
Win	6–6	Nov 2005	Helsinki, Finland	Challenger	Hard	(Czech Republic) Tomáš Cakl	7–6^{(7–2)}, 7–6^{(7–4)}
Loss	6–7	Sep 2006	Sweden F4, Gothenburg	Futures	Hard	(Sweden) Joachim Johansson	1–6, 6–7^{(4–7)}
Win	7–7	Feb 2008	Guangzhou, China	Challenger	Hard	(Thailand) Danai Udomchoke	2–6, 7–6^{(7–4)}, 6–2
Win	8–7	Jul 2008	Manchester, United Kingdom	Challenger	Grass	(United Kingdom) Richard Bloomfield	7–6^{(10–8)}, 0–6, 6–3

=== Doubles: 7 (6–1) ===
Legend ATP Challenger (1–1) ITF Futures (5–0)	Finals by surface Hard (5–1) Clay (1–0) Grass (0–0) Carpet (0–0)

Result	W–L	Date	Tournament	Tier	Surface	Partner	Opponents	Score
Win	1–0	Jun 1999	Finland F1, Oulu	Futures	Clay	(Sweden) Mikael Maatta	(Russia) Mikhail Elgin (Finland) Timo Nieminen	7–6, 6–4
Win	2–0	Oct 1999	Great Britain F11, Leeds	Futures	Hard	(Sweden) Nicklas Timfjord	(Switzerland) Yves Allegro (France) Olivier Patience	6–4, 7–6
Win	3–0	Oct 2000	Finland F1, Vierumäki	Futures	Hard	(Sweden) Matthis Kempe-Bergman	(Sweden) Mattias Pennonen (Sweden) Tobias Steinel-Hansson	3–6, 6–2, 7–5
Win	4–0	Mar 2001	New Zealand F2, Christchurch	Futures	Hard	(Sweden) Henrik Andersson	(Australia) Luke Bourgeois (Australia) Andrew Painter	3–6, 6–3, 6–2
Win	5–0	Sep 2001	Sweden F1, Gothenburg	Futures	Hard	(Sweden) Johan Kareld	(Sweden) Jonas Froberg (Sweden) Robin Söderling	7–6^{(7–3)}, 6–4
Win	6–0	Oct 2002	Burbank, United States	Challenger	Hard	(South Africa) Louis Vosloo	(Brazil) Daniel Melo (Peru) Iván Miranda	7–6^{(8–6)}, 6–1
Loss	6–1	Apr 2006	Cardiff, United Kingdom	Challenger	Hard	(Sweden) Filip Prpic	(Germany) Philipp Petzschner (Austria) Alexander Peya	6–4, 3–6, [7–10]

== Performance timeline ==
Key
W	F	SF	QF	#R	RR	Q#	DNQ	A	NH

(W) winner; (F) finalist; (SF) semifinalist; (QF) quarterfinalist; (#R) rounds 4, 3, 2, 1; (RR) round-robin stage; (Q#) qualification round; (DNQ) did not qualify; (A) absent; (NH) not held; (SR) strike rate (events won / competed); (W–L) win–loss record.

=== Singles ===
Tournament	2002	2003	2004	2005	2006	2007	2008	2009	SR	W–L	Win %
Grand Slam tournaments
Australian Open	Q2	Q1	Q1	A	1R	A	Q2	1R	0 / 2	0–2	0%
French Open	Q1	Q2	Q1	Q1	A	A	Q1	Q2	0 / 0	0–0	–
Wimbledon	Q2	Q1	Q1	Q1	Q1	A	Q2	Q1	0 / 0	0–0	–
US Open	1R	Q1	Q2	Q1	A	A	Q2	A	0 / 1	0–1	0%
Win–loss	0–1	0–0	0–0	0–0	0–1	0–0	0–0	0–1	0 / 3	0–3	0%
