= Nicklas Timfjord =

Swedish tennis player

- Country (sports): Sweden
- Residence: Gothenburg, Sweden
- Born: 18 March 1977 (age 49) Gothenburg, Sweden
- Height: 1.80 m (5 ft 11 in)
- Plays: Right-handed
- Prize money: $40,564

Singles
- Career record: 0–3
- Career titles: 0; 3 ITF
- Highest ranking: No. 261 (14 Jul 1997)

Grand Slam singles results
- French Open: Q1 (1997)

Doubles
- Career record: 0–1
- Career titles: 0; 4 ITF
- Highest ranking: No. 518 (10 Feb 1997)

Nicklas Timfjord (born 18 March 1977) is a former professional tennis player from Sweden.

== Career ==
As a junior, Timfjord reached a singles high of no. 11 in the world on the ITF Junior rankings and no. 10 in doubles. In 1996, Timfjord, along with Thomas Johansson and Mårten Renström, represented Sweden in the European Men's Team Championships (formerly known as the King's Cup). He won all his singles matches, as well as his doubles matches with Renström, helping Sweden to win the title.

He made his ATP main draw debut at the 1997 Swedish Open as a qualifier in the singles draw, losing to his compatriot, world number 36 and third seed Magnus Larsson. He and his partner, Henrik Andersson, also received a wild card into the Doubles draw, where they lost to the tournament third seeds, Mark Keil and Fernando Meligeni. Timfjord had two further appearances at the Swedish Open, in 1999 and 2000, losing in the first round on both occasions.

He mainly participated on the Futures circuit, reaching five singles final and winning three titles and has a career high ATP singles ranking of 261 achieved on 14 July 2008. He also has a career high ATP doubles ranking of 518 achieved on 10 February 1997.

== ITF Futures Titles ==
=== Singles: (3) ===
No.	Date	Tournament	Surface	Opponent	Score
1.	Sep 1998	Oslo, Norway F1	Carpet	(Sweden) Jan Hermansson	4–6, 6–3, 7–6
2.	Aug 1999	Pärnu, Estonia F1	Clay	(Czech Republic) Radim Žitko	6–1, 2–6, 6–2
3.	Oct 2002	Jersey, Great Britain F10	Hard(I)	(South Africa) Wesley Moodie	6–3, 7–6

=== Doubles: (4) ===
No.	Date	Tournament	Surface	Partner	Opponents	Score
1.	Aug 1998	Pärnu, Estonia F1	Clay	(Sweden) Henrik Andersson	(Finland) Lassi Ketola (Finland) Janne Ojala	6–3, 7–5
2.	Oct 1999	Leeds, Great Britain F1	Hard	(Sweden) Björn Rehnquist	(Switzerland) Yves Allegro (France) Olivier Patience	6–4, 7–6
3.	May 2001	Newcastle, Great Britain F5	Clay	(Sweden) Fredrik Lovén	(Australia) Steven Randjelovic (Sweden) Robert Samuelsson	6–3, 6–0
4.	May 2002	Esslingen, Germany F2	Clay	(Sweden) Kalle Flygt	(Czech Republic) Pavel Šnobel (Czech Republic) Tomáš Zíb	6–4, 6–3
