= 2002 International Raiffeisen Grand Prix =

- Date: 20–26 May
- Edition: 22nd
- Category: International Series
- Draw: 32S / 16D
- Prize money: $356,000
- Surface: Clay / outdoor
- Location: Sankt Pölten, Austria

Champions

Singles
- (Ecuador) Nicolás Lapentti

Doubles
- (Czech Republic) Petr Pála / (Czech Republic) David Rikl
| ← 2001 · | International Raiffeisen Grand Prix | · 2003 → |

The 2002 International Raiffeisen Grand Prix was a men's tennis tournament played on outdoor clay courts in Sankt Pölten in Austria and was part of the International Series of the 2002 ATP Tour. It was the 22nd edition of the tournament and ran from 20 May through 26 May 2002. Second-seeded Nicolás Lapentti won the singles title.

== Finals ==
=== Singles ===
(Ecuador) Nicolás Lapentti defeated (Spain) Fernando Vicente 7–5, 6–4

- It was Lapentti's only title of the year and the 8th of his career.

=== Doubles ===
(Czech Republic) Petr Pála / (Czech Republic) David Rikl defeated (United States) Mike Bryan / (Australia) Michael Hill 7–5, 6–4

- It was Pála's only title of the year and the 2nd of his career. It was Rikl's 1st title of the year and the 23rd of his career.
