= Lassi Ketola =

Finnish tennis player

- Full name: Lassi Olavi Ketola
- Country (sports): Finland
- Born: 16 January 1978 (age 47); Kajaani, Finland
- Height: 6 ft 5 in (196 cm)
- Plays: Right-handed
- Prize money: $23,430

Singles
- Highest ranking: No. 653 (13 Sep 2004)

Doubles
- Highest ranking: No. 288 (5 Jul 2004)

Lassi Olavi Ketola (born 16 January 1978) is a Finnish former professional tennis player.

Born in Kajaani, Ketola was a five-time winner at the national doubles championships and played collegiate tennis for the UCLA Bruins before turning professional.

Ketola made two doubles finals on the ATP Challenger Tour and was a Davis Cup representative for Finland in 2004, partnering Juho Paukku in a doubles rubber against Israel.

== ITF Futures titles ==
=== Doubles: (2) ===
No.	Date	Tournament	Surface	Partner	Opponents	Score
1.	Jun 1998	Finland F3, Hämeenlinna	Clay	(Finland) Janne Ojala	(United Kingdom) James Davidson (Denmark) Patrik Langvardt	3–6, 6–3, 6–2
2.	Aug 1999	Estonia F1, Pärnu	Clay	(Finland) Tero Vilen	(Sweden) Henrik Andersson (Sweden) Nicklas Timfjord	7–6, 6–4

== See also ==
- List of Finland Davis Cup team representatives
