= 2000 Citrix Tennis Championships =

- Date: February 28 – March 6
- Edition: 8th
- Category: International Series
- Draw: 32S / 16D
- Prize money: $350,000
- Surface: Hard / outdoor
- Location: Delray Beach, United States

Champions

Singles
- (Austria) Stefan Koubek

Doubles
- (United States) Brian MacPhie / (Serbia and Montenegro) Nenad Zimonjić
← 1999 ·	Delray Beach Open	· 2001 →

The 2000 Citrix Tennis Championships was an ATP men's tennis tournament held in Delray Beach, Florida, USA and was part of the International Series of the 2000 ATP Tour. The tournament was held from February 28 to March 6, 2000. Sixth-seeded Stefan Koubek won the singles title.

== Finals ==
=== Singles ===
(Austria) Stefan Koubek defeated (Spain) Álex Calatrava 6–1, 4–6, 6–4

- It was Koubek's only singles title of the year and the 2nd of his career.

=== Doubles ===
(United States) Brian MacPhie / (Serbia and Montenegro) Nenad Zimonjić defeated (Australia) Joshua Eagle / (Australia) Andrew Florent 7–5, 6–4

- It was MacPhie's only title of the year and the 2nd of his career. It was Zimonjić's 2nd title of the year and the 3rd of his career.
