= 2004 International Raiffeisen Grand Prix – Singles =

Singles
- 2004 International Raiffeisen Grand Prix

Final
- Champion: (Italy) Filippo Volandri
- Runner-up: (Belgium) Xavier Malisse
- Score: 6–1, 6–4

Details
- Draw: 32
- Seeds: 8

Events
| Singles | Doubles |
- International Raiffeisen Grand Prix

Filippo Volandri defeated Xavier Malisse 6–1, 6–4 to win the singles title at the 2004 International Raiffeisen Grand Prix.

Andy Roddick was the defending champion, but did not participate this year.

== Seeds ==
1. (United States) Andre Agassi (first round)
2. (Armenia) Sargis Sargsian (withdrew)
3. (Russia) Nikolay Davydenko (quarterfinals, retired)
4. (Georgia (country)) Irakli Labadze (first round)
5. (Sweden) Joachim Johansson (first round)
6. (Spain) David Sánchez (semifinals)
7. (Croatia) Ivo Karlović (second round)
8. (Italy) Filippo Volandri (champion)

== Draw ==
Key

- Q = Qualifier
- WC = Wild card
- LL = Lucky loser
- Alt = Alternate
- ITF = ITF entry
- PR = Protected ranking
- SR = Special ranking
- SE = Special exempt
- JE = Junior exempt
- JR = Junior Accelerator Programme entrant
- CO = College Accelerator Programme entrant
- NG = Next Gen Accelerator Program entrant
- w/o = Walkover
- r = Retired
- d = Defaulted

=== Finals ===
Semifinals
8 | (Italy) Filippo Volandri | 6 | 4 | 6
6 | (Spain) David Sánchez | 1 | 6 | 4
(Austria) Jürgen Melzer | 6 | 3 | 3
Q | (Belgium) Xavier Malisse | 3 | 6 | 6

Final
8 | (Italy) Filippo Volandri | 6 | 6
Q | (Belgium) Xavier Malisse | 1 | 4

=== Top half ===
First round
1/WC | (United States) A Agassi | 2 | 6^{6}
Q | (Serbia and Montenegro) N Zimonjić | 6 | 7^{8}
(Germany) A Popp | 4 | 2
(Romania) V Hănescu | 6 | 6
(Netherlands) R Sluiter | 6 | 2 | 6
(Czech Republic) T Zíb | 4 | 6 | 3
(Czech Republic) T Berdych | 3 | 1
8 | (Italy) F Volandri | 6 | 6
3 | (Russia) N Davydenko | 6 | 6
(Russia) D Tursunov | 2 | 0
(Croatia) M Ančić | 6 | 6
(Spain) G Blanco | 2 | 4
(Austria) S Koubek | 7 | 7^{7}
Q | (Sweden) R Söderling | 5 | 6^{3}
(United States) J-M Gambill | 3 | 4
6 | (Spain) D Sánchez | 6 | 6

Second round
Q | (Serbia and Montenegro) N Zimonjić | 2 | 2
(Romania) V Hănescu | 6 | 6
(Netherlands) R Sluiter | 4 | 2
8 | (Italy) F Volandri | 6 | 6
3 | (Russia) N Davydenko | 6 | 7
(Croatia) M Ančić | 4 | 5
(Austria) S Koubek
6 | (Spain) D Sánchez | w/o

Quarterfinals
(Romania) V Hănescu | 4 | 3
8 | (Italy) F Volandri | 6 | 6
3 | (Russia) N Davydenko | 6 | 1 | 0^{r}
6 | (Spain) D Sánchez | 3 | 6 | 0

Semifinals
8 | (Italy) F Volandri | 6 | 4 | 6
6 | (Spain) D Sánchez | 1 | 6 | 4

=== Bottom half ===
First round
5 | (Sweden) J Johansson | 2 | 6^{2}
(Russia) I Andreev | 6 | 7^{7}
(Austria) J Melzer | 6 | 7^{7}
(United Kingdom) G Rusedski | 2 | 6^{1}
(Israel) H Levy | 1 | 1
(Belgium) O Rochus | 6 | 6
WC | (Austria) J Knowle | 7 | 4 | 6
4 | (Georgia (country)) I Labadze | 5 | 6 | 2
7 | (Croatia) I Karlović | 6^{3} | 6 | 6
Q | (Italy) A Stoppini | 7^{7} | 4 | 3
WC | (Austria) D Köllerer | 2 | 6 | 6
(Italy) D Sanguinetti | 6 | 2 | 4
Q | (Belgium) X Malisse | 7 | 6
(Slovakia) K Beck | 5 | 0
(Germany) T Behrend | 4 | 3
LL | (United States) H Armando | 6 | 6

Second round
(Russia) I Andreev | 3 | 5
(Austria) J Melzer | 6 | 7
(Belgium) O Rochus | 3 | 6 | 6
WC | (Austria) J Knowle | 6 | 3 | 1
7 | (Croatia) I Karlović | 2 | 6 | 3
WC | (Austria) D Köllerer | 6 | 4 | 6
Q | (Belgium) X Malisse | 6 | 6
LL | (United States) H Armando | 2 | 2

Quarterfinals
(Austria) J Melzer | 4 | 7^{7} | 6
(Belgium) O Rochus | 6 | 6^{5} | 2
WC | (Austria) D Köllerer | 4 | 6 | 1
Q | (Belgium) X Malisse | 6 | 3 | 6

Semifinals
(Austria) J Melzer | 6 | 3 | 3
Q | (Belgium) X Malisse | 3 | 6 | 6
