= 2000 Wideyes Swedish Open – Doubles =

Doubles
- 2000 Wideyes Swedish Open

Final
- Champions: (Sweden) Nicklas Kulti (Sweden) Mikael Tillström
- Runners-up: (Italy) Andrea Gaudenzi (Italy) Diego Nargiso
- Score: 4–6, 6–2, 6–3

Events
| Singles | Doubles |
| ← 1999 · | Swedish Open | · 2001 → |

David Adams and Jeff Tarango were the defending champions, but lost in first round to Pablo Albano and Sebastián Prieto.

Nicklas Kulti and Mikael Tillström won the title by defeating Andrea Gaudenzi and Diego Nargiso 4–6, 6–2, 6–3 in the final.

== Seeds ==
1. (Sweden) Nicklas Kulti / (Sweden) Mikael Tillström (champions)
2. (South Africa) David Adams / (United States) Jeff Tarango (first round)
3. (Australia) Joshua Eagle / (Australia) Andrew Florent (semifinals)
4. (Sweden) Simon Aspelin / (Sweden) Johan Landsberg (first round)

== Draw ==
=== Key ===
- Q = Qualifier
- WC = Wild card
- LL = Lucky loser
- Alt = Alternate
- ITF = ITF entry
- PR = Protected ranking
- SR = Special ranking
- SE = Special exempt
- JE = Junior exempt
- JR = Junior Accelerator Programme entrant
- CO = College Accelerator Programme entrant
- NG = Next Gen Accelerator Program entrant
- w/o = Walkover
- r = Retired
- d = Defaulted

=== Draw ===
First round
1 | (Sweden) N Kulti (Sweden) M Tillström | 6 | 6
(Japan) T Shimada (South Africa) M Wakefield | 4 | 3
(United States) D Bowen (Brazil) A Prieto | 2 | 4
(Italy) M Bertolini (Italy) C Brandi | 6 | 6
4 | (Sweden) S Aspelin (Sweden) J Landsberg | 7^{7} | 5 | 3
(Spain) Á López Morón (Spain) A Portas | 6^{3} | 7 | 6
WC | (Sweden) M Norman (Sweden) P Nyborg | 6 | 3 | 4
WC | (Sweden) F Bergh (Sweden) A Vinciguerra | 3 | 6 | 6
(France) J Boutter (United States) J Waite | 2 | 6 | 6
(Spain) A Martín (Israel) E Ran | 6 | 4 | 4
WC | (Sweden) M Gustafsson (Slovakia) D Hrbatý | 4 | 4
3 | (Australia) J Eagle (Australia) A Florent | 6 | 6
(Italy) A Gaudenzi (Italy) D Nargiso | 6 | 6
Q | (Spain) E Nicolás (Belgium) C Rochus | 4 | 0
(Argentina) P Albano (Argentina) S Prieto | 7^{8} | 6
2 | (South Africa) D Adams (United States) J Tarango | 6^{6} | 1

Quarterfinals
1 | (Sweden) N Kulti (Sweden) M Tillström | 6 | 2 | 7^{7}
(Italy) M Bertolini (Italy) C Brandi | 2 | 6 | 6^{5}
(Spain) Á López Morón (Spain) A Portas | 6^{2} | 3
WC | (Sweden) F Bergh (Sweden) A Vinciguerra | 7^{7} | 6
(France) J Boutter (United States) J Waite | 2 | 3
3 | (Australia) J Eagle (Australia) A Florent | 6 | 6
(Italy) A Gaudenzi (Italy) D Nargiso | 6 | 6
(Argentina) P Albano (Argentina) S Prieto | 2 | 2

Semifinals
1 | (Sweden) N Kulti (Sweden) M Tillström | 6 | 6
WC | (Sweden) F Bergh (Sweden) A Vinciguerra | 2 | 3
3 | (Australia) J Eagle (Australia) A Florent | 6 | 6^{5} | 4
(Italy) A Gaudenzi (Italy) D Nargiso | 3 | 7^{7} | 6

Final
1 | (Sweden) N Kulti (Sweden) M Tillström | 4 | 6 | 6
(Italy) A Gaudenzi (Italy) D Nargiso | 6 | 2 | 3
