= 2002 Delray Beach International Tennis Championships – Singles =

Singles
- 2002 Delray Beach International Tennis Championships

Final
- Champion: (Italy) Davide Sanguinetti
- Runner-up: (United States) Andy Roddick
- Score: 6–4, 4–6, 6–4

Details
- Draw: 32
- Seeds: 8

Events
Singles	Doubles
- Delray Beach Open

Jan-Michael Gambill was the defending champion but lost in the semifinals to Davide Sanguinetti.

Sanguinetti won in the final 6–4, 4–6, 6–4 against Andy Roddick.

== Seeds ==
1. (United States) Andy Roddick (final)
2. (United States) Jan-Michael Gambill (semifinals)
3. (Austria) Stefan Koubek (first round)
4. (Chile) Nicolás Massú (second round, retired because of a right elbow injury)
5. (Italy) Davide Sanguinetti (champion)
6. (Germany) Lars Burgsmüller (second round)
7. (Finland) Jarkko Nieminen (second round)
8. (Austria) Markus Hipfl (second round)

== Draw ==
Key

- Q = Qualifier
- WC = Wild card
- LL = Lucky loser
- Alt = Alternate
- ITF = ITF entry
- PR = Protected ranking
- SR = Special ranking
- SE = Special exempt
- JE = Junior exempt
- JR = Junior Accelerator Programme entrant
- CO = College Accelerator Programme entrant
- NG = Next Gen Accelerator Program entrant
- w/o = Walkover
- r = Retired
- d = Defaulted

=== Finals ===
Semifinals
1	(United States) Andy Roddick	7^{7}	6
(France) Antony Dupuis	6^{4}	4
5	(Italy) Davide Sanguinetti	7^{10}	6
2	(United States) Jan-Michael Gambill	6^{8}	3

Final
1	(United States) Andy Roddick	4	6	4
5	(Italy) Davide Sanguinetti	6	4	6

=== Top half ===
First round
1	(United States) A Roddick	6	6
(Russia) N Davydenko	4	1
(South Korea) H-T Lee	6	6
(Spain) D Sánchez	2	3
(Spain) Á Calatrava	0^{r}
(France) M Llodra	5
(Hungary) A Sávolt	5	5
8	(Austria) M Hipfl	7	7
3	(Austria) S Koubek	6	3	2
(United States) M Russell	3	6	6
Q	(Spain) F López	6^{4}	6	6
Q	(United States) C Woodruff	7^{7}	3	4
(Spain) J Díaz	4	1
(France) A Dupuis	6	6
WC	(United States) P Goldstein	1	2
7	(Finland) J Nieminen	6	6

Second round
1	(United States) A Roddick	7	6
(South Korea) H-T Lee	5	2
(France) M Llodra	6	6
8	(Austria) M Hipfl	3	4
(United States) M Russell	6	3	4
Q	(Spain) F López	4	6	6
(France) A Dupuis	2	7^{9}	6
7	(Finland) J Nieminen	6	6^{7}	1

Quarterfinals
1	(United States) A Roddick	4	6	6
(France) M Llodra	6	4	4
Q	(Spain) F López	6^{2}	6^{3}
(France) A Dupuis	7^{7}	7^{7}

Semifinals
1	(United States) A Roddick	7^{7}	6
(France) A Dupuis	6^{4}	4

=== Bottom half ===
First round
5	(Italy) D Sanguinetti	0	6	6
(Belgium) C Rochus	6	4	1
(Denmark) K Pless	6	6
(Paraguay) R Delgado	4	3
(Thailand) P Srichaphan	5	6	6
(Czech Republic) J Vacek	7	4	4
WC	(United States) J Morrison	4	4
4	(Chile) N Massú	6	6
6	(Germany) L Burgsmüller	6	4	6
Q	(Brazil) A Simoni	2	6	2
(Brazil) A Sá	6	6
Q	(Netherlands) M Verkerk	4	4
WC	(United States) M Fish	6	2	7^{7}
(Russia) A Stoliarov	4	6	6^{1}
(Australia) W Arthurs	7^{7}	3	6^{6}
2	(United States) J-M Gambill	6^{5}	6	7^{8}

Second round
5	(Italy) D Sanguinetti	6	6
(Denmark) K Pless	3	2
(Thailand) P Srichaphan	2
4	(Chile) N Massú	1^{r}
6	(Germany) L Burgsmüller	6^{6}	5
(Brazil) A Sá	7^{8}	7
WC	(United States) M Fish	3	7^{7}	1
2	(United States) J-M Gambill	6	6^{2}	6

Quarterfinals
5	(Italy) D Sanguinetti	6	3	6
(Thailand) P Srichaphan	4	6	3
(Brazil) A Sá	7^{7}	4	4
2	(United States) J-M Gambill	6^{4}	6	6

Semifinals
5	(Italy) D Sanguinetti	7^{10}	6
2	(United States) J-M Gambill	6^{8}	3
