= 1998 Investor Swedish Open – Doubles =

Doubles
- 1998 Swedish Open

Final
- Champions: (Sweden) Magnus Gustafsson (Sweden) Magnus Larsson
- Runners-up: (South Africa) Lan Bale (South Africa) Piet Norval
- Score: 6–4, 6–2

Events
Singles	Doubles
← 1997 ·	Swedish Open	· 1999 →

== Seeds ==
Champion seeds are indicated in bold text while text in italics indicates the round in which those seeds were eliminated.

1. (Sweden) Nicklas Kulti / (Sweden) Mikael Tillström (semifinals)
2. (United States) Brandon Coupe / (Mexico) David Roditi (first round)
3. (Sweden) Peter Nyborg / (Netherlands) Menno Oosting (first round)
4. Unknown (withdrew)

== Draw ==
=== Key ===
- Q = Qualifier
- WC = Wild card
- LL = Lucky loser
- Alt = Alternate
- ITF = ITF entry
- PR = Protected ranking
- SR = Special ranking
- SE = Special exempt
- JE = Junior exempt
- JR = Junior Accelerator Programme entrant
- CO = College Accelerator Programme entrant
- NG = Next Gen Accelerator Program entrant
- w/o = Walkover
- r = Retired
- d = Defaulted

=== Finals ===
First round
1	(Sweden) **N Kulti** **(Sweden) M Tillström**	**6**	**6**
(Netherlands) S Noteboom (Belgium) T Vanhoudt	1	3
(Morocco) **K Alami** **(Hungary) G Köves**	**7**	2	**6**
(Germany) K Braasch (Austria) T Buchmayer	**6**	**6**	3
(South Africa) **L Bale** **(South Africa) P Norval**	**6**	3	**7**
3	(Sweden) P Nyborg (Netherlands) M Oosting	3	**6**	5
(South Africa) **C Haggard** **(South Africa) P Rosner**	**6**	**7**
(Spain) JA Conde (Spain) J Sánchez	3	5
(Italy) **M Bertolini** **(United States) D Bowen**	**6**	**6**	**7**
(Sweden) J Johansson (Russia) M Safin	**7**	4	5
(Italy) **A Gaudenzi** **(Italy) D Nargiso**	**6**	**6**
(France) J-P Fleurian (United States) J Waite	3	4
(Sweden) **F Bergh** **(Sweden) R Bergh**	**7**	**7**
(Sweden) J Johansson (Sweden) M Norman	**6**	**6**
(Sweden) **M Gustafsson** **(Sweden) M Larsson**	**6**	4	**6**
2	(United States) B Coupe (Mexico) D Roditi	2	**6**	4

Quarterfinals
1	(Sweden) **N Kulti** **(Sweden) M Tillström**	w/o
(Morocco) K Alami (Hungary) G Köves
(South Africa) **L Bale** **(South Africa) P Norval**	**6**	**7**
(South Africa) C Haggard (South Africa) P Rosner	0	5
(Italy) M Bertolini (United States) D Bowen	3	3
(Italy) **A Gaudenzi** **(Italy) D Nargiso**	**6**	**6**
(Sweden) F Bergh (Sweden) R Bergh	**6**	4	2
(Sweden) **M Gustafsson** **(Sweden) M Larsson**	2	**6**	**6**

Semifinals
1	(Sweden) N Kulti (Sweden) M Tillström	4	3
(South Africa) **L Bale** **(South Africa) P Norval**	**6**	**6**
(Italy) A Gaudenzi (Italy) D Nargiso
(Sweden) **M Gustafsson** **(Sweden) M Larsson**	w/o

Final
(South Africa) L Bale (South Africa) P Norval	4	2
(Sweden) **M Gustafsson** **(Sweden) M Larsson**	**6**	**6**
