= Henrik Andersson (tennis) =

Swedish tennis player

- Country (sports): Sweden
- Born: 2 May 1977 (age 47); Stockholm, Sweden
- Height: 1.93 m (6 ft 4 in)
- Plays: Right-handed
- Prize money: $47,713

Singles
- Career record: 0–2 (at ATP Tour level)
- Career titles: 0; 1 Challenger
- Highest ranking: No. 314 (23 Oct 2000)

Grand Slam singles results
- Australian Open: Q2 (1999),

Doubles
- Career record: 0–1 (at ATP Tour level)
- Career titles: 0
- Highest ranking: No. 352 (28 Feb 2000)

Henrik Andersson (born 2 May 1977) is a former professional tennis player from Sweden.

== Career ==
Andersson made his ATP singles main draw debut at the 1997 Swedish Open as a qualifier, losing to world number 71 Jeff Tarango.

The Swede won one Challenger title, but most of his singles matches were played on the Futures circuit. He reached four finals on the Futures circuit, winning one title and also won nine doubles titles on the Futures circuit.

Andersson has a career high ATP singles ranking of 314 achieved on 23 October 2000. He also has a career high ATP doubles ranking of 352 achieved on 28 February 2000.

== Challenger titles ==
=== Singles: (1) ===
No.	Year	Tournament	Surface	Opponent	Score
1.	2000	Hull, Great Britain	Carpet	(United Kingdom) Mark Hilton	6–4, 3–6, 6–4

== ITF Futures titles ==
=== Singles: (1) ===
No.	Year	Tournament	Surface	Opponent	Score
1.	1998	Tauranga, New Zealand F3	Carpet	(Republic of Ireland) John Doran	7–6, 6–4,

=== Doubles: (9) ===
No.	Date	Tournament	Surface	Partner	Opponents	Score
1.	Aug 1998	Pärnu, Estonia F1	Clay	(Sweden) Nicklas Timfjord	(Finland) Lassi Ketola (Finland) Janne Ojala	6–3, 7–5
2.	Aug 1999	Jupille-sur-Meuse, Belgium F1	Clay	(Sweden) Johan Settergren	(Australia) Stephen Huss (Australia) Lee Pearson	6–4, 7–5
3.	Aug 1999	Brussels, Belgium F2	Hard	(Sweden) Johan Settergren	(Argentina) Daniel Caracciolo (Argentina) Fernando Las Heras	7–5, 6–1
4.	Feb 2000	Eastbourne, Great Britain F1	Carpet	(Norway) Helge Koll-Frafjord	(United Kingdom) Oliver Freelove (United Kingdom) Tom Spinks	7–5, 7–5
5.	Aug 2000	Berlin, Germany F11	Clay	(Sweden) Johan Settergren	(Belgium) Wim Neefs (Netherlands) Djalmar Sistermans	6–3, 5–7, 7–5
6.	Oct 2000	Oslo, Norway F1	Carpet	(Sweden) Johan Settergren	(Germany) Andreas Tattermusch (Germany) Ulrich Tippenhauer	6–3, 7–6 ^{(7–2)}
7.	Mar 2001	Christchurch, New Zealand F2	Hard	(Sweden) Björn Rehnquist	(Australia) Luke Bourgeois (Australia) Andrew Painter	3–6, 6–3, 6–2
8.	Oct 2001	Edinburgh, Great Britain F10	Hard	(United States) Doug Root	(South Africa) Wesley Moodie (South Africa) Louis Vosloo	6–2, 3–6, 7–5
9.	Sep 2002	El Menzah, Tunisia F1	Hard	(Australia) Luke Bourgeois	(France) Benjamin Cassaigne (Germany) Frank Moser	7–6 ^{(7–5)}, 6–7 ^{(5–7)}, 7–6 ^{(7–5)}
