= 2001 International Raiffeisen Grand Prix – Singles =

Singles
- 2001 International Raiffeisen Grand Prix

Final
- Champion: (Italy) Andrea Gaudenzi
- Runner-up: (Austria) Markus Hipfl
- Score: 6–0, 7–5

Events
Singles	Doubles
- International Raiffeisen Grand Prix

Andrei Pavel was the defending champion but lost in the quarterfinals to Magnus Gustafsson.

Andrea Gaudenzi won in the final 6–0, 7–5 against Markus Hipfl.

== Seeds ==
A champion seed is indicated in bold text while text in italics indicates the round in which that seed was eliminated.

1. (Slovakia) Dominik Hrbatý (first round)
2. (Romania) Andrei Pavel (quarterfinals)
3. (Chile) Marcelo Ríos (first round)
4. (Spain) Albert Portas (first round)
5. (Spain) Álex Calatrava (second round)
6. (Australia) Andrew Ilie (first round)
7. (Czech Republic) Michal Tabara (semifinals)
8. (Sweden) Magnus Gustafsson (semifinals)

== Draw ==
Key

- Q = Qualifier
- WC = Wild card
- LL = Lucky loser
- Alt = Alternate
- ITF = ITF entry
- PR = Protected ranking
- SR = Special ranking
- SE = Special exempt
- JE = Junior exempt
- JR = Junior Accelerator Programme entrant
- CO = College Accelerator Programme entrant
- NG = Next Gen Accelerator Program entrant
- w/o = Walkover
- r = Retired
- d = Defaulted

First round
1	(Slovakia) D Hrbatý	1	1
(Croatia) **I Ljubičić**	**6**	**6**
Q	(Slovakia) J Krošlák	6^{5}	5
LL	(Bulgaria) **I Traykov**	**7^{7}**	**7**
Q	(Argentina) **G Cañas**	**6**	**6**
Q	(United States) B Bryan	3	2
(Spain) D Sánchez	2	3
7	(Czech Republic) **M Tabara**	**6**	**6**
4	(Spain) A Portas	4	1
(Czech Republic) **J Vaněk**	**6**	**6**
WC	(Austria) **M Hipfl**	**6**	**6**
(Germany) D Elsner	3	4
(Belgium) **X Malisse**	**7^{7}**	**6**
WC	(Austria) W Eschauer	6^{4}	0
(Morocco) **K Alami**	6^{4}	**7^{7}**	**7^{7}**
6	(Australia) A Ilie	**7^{7}**	6^{5}	6^{3}
5	(Spain) **Á Calatrava**	**6**	**6**
(South Korea) H-T Lee	3	4
Q	(United States) H Armando	6^{3}	3
(Netherlands) **J Siemerink**	**7^{7}**	**6**
(Belgium) O Rochus	**6**	4	4
(Chile) **N Massú**	0	**6**	**6**
WC	(Italy) **A Gaudenzi**	5	**6**	**6**
3	(Chile) M Ríos	**7**	1	4
8	(Sweden) **M Gustafsson**	**7^{7}**	**6**
(Russia) A Stoliarov	6^{1}	3
(Slovakia) **K Kučera**	**6**	**7^{7}**
(Spain) G Blanco	3	6^{3}
(Armenia) S Sargsian	4	5
(Belgium) **C Rochus**	**6**	**7**
(Austria) S Koubek	3	3
2	(Romania) **A Pavel**	**6**	**6**

Second round
(Croatia) **I Ljubičić**	**6**	6^{5}	**6**
LL	(Bulgaria) I Traykov	2	**7^{7}**	4
Q	(Argentina) G Cañas	4	4
7	(Czech Republic) **M Tabara**	**6**	**6**
(Czech Republic) J Vaněk	5	0
WC	(Austria) **M Hipfl**	**7**	**6**
(Belgium) **X Malisse**	**6**	**6**
(Morocco) K Alami	4	1
5	(Spain) Á Calatrava	5	**6**	2
(Netherlands) **J Siemerink**	**7**	3	**6**
(Chile) N Massú	6^{5}	2
WC	(Italy) **A Gaudenzi**	**7^{7}**	**6**
8	(Sweden) **M Gustafsson**	**7**	**7^{7}**
(Slovakia) K Kučera	5	6^{3}
(Belgium) C Rochus	1	1
2	(Romania) **A Pavel**	**6**	**6**

Quarterfinals
(Croatia) I Ljubičić	4	**7**	4
7	(Czech Republic) **M Tabara**	**6**	5	**6**
WC	(Austria) **M Hipfl**	**6**	**6**
(Belgium) X Malisse	3	3
(Netherlands) J Siemerink	6^{4}	3
WC	(Italy) **A Gaudenzi**	**7^{7}**	**6**
8	(Sweden) **M Gustafsson**	**7^{9}**	**6**
2	(Romania) A Pavel	6^{7}	3

Semifinals
7	(Czech Republic) M Tabara	1	**7**	2
WC	(Austria) **M Hipfl**	**6**	5	**6**
WC	(Italy) **A Gaudenzi**	**6**	**6**
8	(Sweden) M Gustafsson	3	3

Final
WC	(Austria) Markus Hipfl	0	5
WC	(Italy) **Andrea Gaudenzi**	**6**	**7**
