= 2002 Delray Beach International Tennis Championships – Doubles =

Doubles
- 2002 Delray Beach International Tennis Championships

Final
- Champions: (Czech Republic) Martin Damm (Czech Republic) Cyril Suk
- Runners-up: (South Africa) David Adams (Australia) Ben Ellwood
- Score: 6–3, 6–7^{(5–7)}, [10–5]

Details
- Draw: 16
- Seeds: 4

Events
| Singles | Doubles |
- Delray Beach Open

Jan-Michael Gambill and Andy Roddick were the defending champions but did not compete that year.

Martin Damm and Cyril Suk won in the final 6–3, 6–7^{(5–7)}, [10–5] against David Adams and Ben Ellwood.

== Seeds ==
1. (India) Mahesh Bhupathi / (India) Leander Paes (first round)
2. (Czech Republic) Martin Damm / (Czech Republic) Cyril Suk (champions)
3. (Sweden) Simon Aspelin / (Australia) Andrew Kratzmann (quarterfinals)
4. (France) Michaël Llodra / (Japan) Thomas Shimada (semifinals)

== Draw ==
Key

- Q = Qualifier
- WC = Wild card
- LL = Lucky loser
- Alt = Alternate
- ITF = ITF entry
- PR = Protected ranking
- SR = Special ranking
- SE = Special exempt
- JE = Junior exempt
- JR = Junior Accelerator Programme entrant
- CO = College Accelerator Programme entrant
- NG = Next Gen Accelerator Program entrant
- w/o = Walkover
- r = Retired
- d = Defaulted

First round
WC/1 | (India) M Bhupathi (India) L Paes | 4 | 6^{7}
(South Africa) C Haggard (Belgium) T Vanhoudt | 6 | 7^{9}
(United States) J Gimelstob (Australia) T Woodbridge | 4 | 6 | [10]
(Australia) M Hill (Czech Republic) D Vacek | 6 | 2 | [8]
3 | (Sweden) S Aspelin (Australia) A Kratzmann | 6 | 6
(Germany) L Burgsmüller (Italy) D Sanguinetti | 3 | 2
(Austria) M Hipfl (Austria) S Koubek | 3 | 4
(South Africa) D Adams (Australia) B Ellwood | 6 | 6
WC | (United States) S Humphries (United States) G Oliver | 5 | 6 | [10]
WC | (United States) L Jensen (United States) M Jensen | 7 | 4 | [6]
(Argentina) G Etlis (Argentina) M Rodríguez | 6 | 5 | [7]
4 | (France) M Llodra (Japan) T Shimada | 4 | 7 | [10]
(Argentina) D Orsanic (United States) J Thomas | 2 | 6^{3}
(Czech Republic) L Friedl (Czech Republic) P Luxa | 6 | 7^{7}
(South Africa) M Barnard (South Africa) J-L de Jager | 7 | 5 | [6]
2 | (Czech Republic) M Damm (Czech Republic) C Suk | 5 | 7 | [10]

Quarterfinals
(South Africa) C Haggard (Belgium) T Vanhoudt | 3 | 2
(United States) J Gimelstob (Australia) T Woodbridge | 6 | 6
3 | (Sweden) S Aspelin (Australia) A Kratzmann | 3 | 4
(South Africa) D Adams (Australia) B Ellwood | 6 | 6
WC | (United States) S Humphries (United States) G Oliver | 6 | 2 | [8]
4 | (France) M Llodra (Japan) T Shimada | 4 | 6 | [10]
(Czech Republic) L Friedl (Czech Republic) P Luxa | 1 | 2
2 | (Czech Republic) M Damm (Czech Republic) C Suk | 6 | 6

Semifinals
(United States) J Gimelstob (Australia) T Woodbridge | 6^{6} | 1
(South Africa) D Adams (Australia) B Ellwood | 7^{8} | 6
4 | (France) M Llodra (Japan) T Shimada | 2 | 4
2 | (Czech Republic) M Damm (Czech Republic) C Suk | 6 | 6

Final
(South Africa) D Adams (Australia) B Ellwood | 4 | 7^{7} | [5]
2 | (Czech Republic) M Damm (Czech Republic) C Suk | 6 | 6^{5} | [10]
