= 2002 Delray Beach International Tennis Championships =

- Date: March 4–10
- Edition: 10th
- Category: International Series
- Draw: 32S / 16D
- Prize money: $375,000
- Surface: Hard / outdoor
- Location: Delray Beach, Florida, U.S.
- Venue: Delray Beach Tennis Center

Champions

Singles
- (Italy) Davide Sanguinetti

Doubles
- (Czech Republic) Martin Damm / (Czech Republic) Cyril Suk
- Delray Beach Open

The 2002 Delray Beach International Tennis Championships was a men's tennis tournament played on outdoor hard courts at the Delray Beach Tennis Center in Delray Beach, Florida in the United States and was part of the International Series of the 2002 ATP Tour. It was the 10th edition of the tournament and ran from March 4 through March 11, 2002. Fifth-seeded Davide Sanguinetti won the singles title.

== Finals ==
=== Singles ===
(Italy) Davide Sanguinetti defeated (United States) Andy Roddick 6–4, 4–6, 6–4

- It was Sanguinetti's 2nd singles title of the year and of his career.

=== Doubles ===
(Czech Republic) Martin Damm / (Czech Republic) Cyril Suk defeated (South Africa) David Adams / (Australia) Ben Ellwood 6–4, 6–7^{(5–7)}, [10–5]

- It was Damm's 1st title of the year and the 21st of his career. It was Suk's 1st title of the year and the 23rd of his career.
