= 2000 Citrix Tennis Championships – Doubles =

Doubles
- 2000 Citrix Tennis Championships

Final
- Champions: (United States) Brian MacPhie (Serbia and Montenegro) Nenad Zimonjić
- Runners-up: (Australia) Joshua Eagle (Australia) Andrew Florent
- Score: 7–5, 6–4

Events
Singles	Doubles
- Delray Beach Open

Max Mirnyi and Nenad Zimonjić were the defending champions, but did not participate together this year. Mirnyi partnered Mark Knowles, losing in the semifinals. Zimonjić partnered Brian MacPhie and successfully defended his title.

Macphie and Zimonjić won in the final 7–5, 6–4, against Joshua Eagle and Andrew Florent.

== Seeds ==
1. (Australia) Sandon Stolle / (Australia) Mark Woodforde (quarterfinals)
2. (South Africa) David Adams / (South Africa) John-Laffnie de Jager (first round)
3. (The Bahamas) Mark Knowles / (Belarus) Max Mirnyi (semifinals)
4. (United States) Donald Johnson / (Czech Republic) Cyril Suk (first round)

== Draw ==
Key

- Q = Qualifier
- WC = Wild card
- LL = Lucky loser
- Alt = Alternate
- ITF = ITF entry
- PR = Protected ranking
- SR = Special ranking
- SE = Special exempt
- JE = Junior exempt
- JR = Junior Accelerator Programme entrant
- CO = College Accelerator Programme entrant
- NG = Next Gen Accelerator Program entrant
- w/o = Walkover
- r = Retired
- d = Defaulted

=== Draw ===
First round
1	(Australia) S Stolle (Australia) M Woodforde	6	6
WC	(United States) I Baron (Thailand) P Srichaphan	0	4
(Australia) J Eagle (Australia) A Florent	6	6
(Australia) A Kratzmann (United States) J Stark	4	4
3	(The Bahamas) M Knowles (Belarus) M Mirnyi	3	6	6
(North Macedonia) A Kitinov (Philippines) E Taino	6	2	3
(South Africa) R Koenig (Australia) P Tramacchi	6	6^{6}	5
WC	(United States) J Blake (United States) T Blake	3	7^{8}	7
(Australia) D Macpherson (South Africa) G Stafford	4	6	7^{7}
(United States) B Bryan (United States) M Bryan	6	3	6^{4}
Q	(United States) P Goldstein (United States) M Sell	6	5	6
4	(United States) D Johnson (Czech Republic) C Suk	3	7	1
(United States) B MacPhie (Serbia and Montenegro) N Zimonjić	6	6
(United States) J Grabb (United States) R Reneberg	3	4
WC	(United States) L Jensen (United States) M Jensen	5	7^{7}	7^{7}
2	(South Africa) D Adams (South Africa) J-L de Jager	7	6^{5}	6^{2}

Quarterfinals
1	(Australia) S Stolle (Australia) M Woodforde	5	6^{3}
(Australia) J Eagle (Australia) A Florent	7	7^{7}
3	(The Bahamas) M Knowles (Belarus) M Mirnyi	6	6
WC	(United States) J Blake (United States) T Blake	3	3
(Australia) D Macpherson (South Africa) G Stafford	6	6
Q	(United States) P Goldstein (United States) M Sell	2	2
(United States) B MacPhie (Serbia and Montenegro) N Zimonjić	6	6
WC	(United States) L Jensen (United States) M Jensen	3	2

Semifinals
(Australia) J Eagle (Australia) A Florent	6	6^{7}	6
3	(The Bahamas) M Knowles (Belarus) M Mirnyi	4	7^{9}	3
(Australia) D Macpherson (South Africa) G Stafford	4	3
(United States) B MacPhie (Serbia and Montenegro) N Zimonjić	6	6

Final
(Australia) J Eagle (Australia) A Florent	5	4
(United States) B MacPhie (Serbia and Montenegro) N Zimonjić	7	6
