= 1997 Swedish Open =

- Date: 7–13 July
- Edition: 50th
- Category: World Series
- Draw: 32S / 16D
- Prize money: $303,000
- Surface: Clay / outdoor
- Location: Båstad, Sweden

Champions

Singles
- (Sweden) Magnus Norman

Doubles
- (Sweden) Nicklas Kulti / (Sweden) Mikael Tillström
- Swedish Open

The 1997 Swedish Open was a men's tennis tournament played on outdoor clay courts in Båstad, Sweden that was part of the World Series of the 1997 ATP Tour. It was the 50th edition of the tournament and was held from 7 July until 13 July 1997. Fourth-seeded Magnus Norman won the singles title.

== Finals ==
=== Singles ===
(Sweden) Magnus Norman defeated (Spain) Juan Antonio Marín 7–5, 6–2

- It was Norman's first singles title of his career.

=== Doubles ===
(Sweden) Nicklas Kulti / (Sweden) Mikael Tillström defeated (Sweden) Magnus Gustafsson / (Sweden) Magnus Larsson 6–0, 6–3
