= 2001 International Raiffeisen Grand Prix =

- Date: 21–27 May
- Edition: 21st
- Category: International Series
- Draw: 32S / 16D
- Prize money: $400,000
- Surface: Clay / outdoor
- Location: Sankt Pölten, Austria

Champions

Singles
- (Italy) Andrea Gaudenzi

Doubles
- (Czech Republic) Petr Pála / (Czech Republic) David Rikl
- International Raiffeisen Grand Prix

The 2001 International Raiffeisen Grand Prix was a men's tennis tournament played on outdoor clay courts in Sankt Pölten in Austria and was part of the International Series of the 2001 ATP Tour. It was the 21st edition of the tournament and took place from 21 May through 27 May 2001. Unseeded Andrea Gaudenzi, who entered the tournament on a wildcard, won the singles title.

== Finals ==
=== Singles ===
(Italy) Andrea Gaudenzi defeated (Austria) Markus Hipfl 6–0, 7–5

- It was Gaudenzi's 1st title of the year and the 2nd singles title of his career.

=== Doubles ===
(Czech Republic) Petr Pála / (Czech Republic) David Rikl defeated (Brazil) Jaime Oncins / (Argentina) Daniel Orsanic 6–3, 5–7, 7–5

- It was Pála's only title of the year and the 1st of his career. It was Rikl's 2nd title of the year and the 21st of his career.
