= 2000 Wideyes Swedish Open =

- Date: 10–16 July
- Edition: 53rd
- Category: International Series
- Draw: 32S / 16D
- Prize money: $350,000
- Surface: Clay / Outdoor
- Location: Båstad, Sweden

Champions

Singles
- (Sweden) Magnus Norman

Doubles
- (Sweden) Nicklas Kulti / (Sweden) Mikael Tillström
- Swedish Open

The 2000 Wideyes Swedish Open was a men's tennis tournament played on outdoor clay courts in Båstad in Sweden and was part of the International Series of the 2000 ATP Tour. It was the 53rd edition of the tournament and ran from 10 July until 16 July 2000. First seeded Magnus Norman won the singles title.

== Finals ==
=== Singles ===
(Sweden) Magnus Norman defeated (Sweden) Andreas Vinciguerra 6–1, 7–6^{(8–6)}

- It was Norman's 3rd singles title of the year and the 10th of his career.

=== Doubles ===
(Sweden) Nicklas Kulti / (Sweden) Mikael Tillström defeated (Italy) Andrea Gaudenzi / (Italy) Diego Nargiso 4–6, 6–2, 6–3

- It was Kulti's 3rd title of the year and the 12th of his career. It was Tillstrom's 3rd title of the year and the 8th of his career.
