= 2004 International Raiffeisen Grand Prix =

- Date: 17–23 May
- Edition: 24th
- Category: International Series
- Draw: 32S / 16D
- Prize money: $355,000
- Surface: Clay / outdoor
- Location: Sankt Pölten, Austria

Champions

Singles
- (Italy) Filippo Volandri

Doubles
- (Argentina) Mariano Hood / (Czech Republic) Petr Pála
- International Raiffeisen Grand Prix

The 2004 International Raiffeisen Grand Prix was a men's tennis tournament played on outdoor clay courts in Sankt Pölten, Austria, and was part of the International Series of the 2004 ATP Tour. It was the 24th edition of the tournament and was held from May 17 through May 23, 2004. Eighth-seeded Filippo Volandri won the singles title.

== Finals ==
=== Singles ===
(Italy) Filippo Volandri defeated (Belgium) Xavier Malisse 6–1, 6–4

- It was Volandri's first singles title of the year and of his career.

=== Doubles ===
(Argentina) Mariano Hood / (Czech Republic) Petr Pála defeated (Czech Republic) Tomáš Cibulec / (Czech Republic) Leoš Friedl 3–6, 7–5, 6–4
