= Janne Ojala =

Finnish tennis player

- Country (sports): Finland
- Born: 7 September 1977 (age 47)
- Prize money: $55,265

Singles
- Career record: 0–2 (Davis Cup)
- Highest ranking: No. 295 (7 Jun 1999)

Doubles
- Highest ranking: No. 272 (6 Dec 1999)

Janne Ojala (born 7 September 1977) is a Finnish former professional tennis player.

Ojala, a Finnish national champion in 1998 and 1999, reached a best singles ranking of 295 while competing on the professional tour. He won four ITF Futures singles titles and was a semi-finalist at the Tampere Challenger in 2001. His career included two Davis Cup appearances for Finland, against Norway in 2003 and Luxembourg in 2004.

== ITF Futures titles ==
=== Singles: (4) ===
No.	Date	Tournament	Surface	Opponent	Score
1.	Aug 2002	Lithuania F1, Vilnius	Clay	(Finland) Timo Nieminen	6–1, 6–0
2.	Jun 2003	Estonia F1A, Tallinn	Clay	(Finland) Timo Nieminen	7–6^{(3)}, 6–2
3.	Aug 2003	Lithuania F1, Vilnius	Clay	(Norway) Stian Boretti	6–2, 6–4
4.	Jul 2004	Estonia F1, Tallinn	Clay	(Netherlands) Bart Beks	7–6^{(4)}, 6–3

=== Doubles: (6) ===
No.	Date	Tournament	Surface	Partner	Opponents	Score
1.	Mar 1998	Israel F1, Jaffa	Hard	(Finland) Tapio Nurminen	(Israel) Jonathan Erlich (Israel) Amir Hadad	6–2, 7–5
2.	Jun 1998	Finland F3, Hämeenlinna	Clay	(Finland) Lassi Ketola	(United Kingdom) James Davidson (Denmark) Patrik Langvardt	3–6, 6–3, 6–2
3.	Nov 1999	Tunisia F2, Tunis	Clay	(Finland) Tapio Nurminen	(Czech Republic) František Čermák (Czech Republic) Petr Dezort	6–2, 4–6, 6–1
4.	Jun 2002	Finland F2, Vierumäki	Clay	(Finland) Tapio Nurminen	(Finland) Lauri Kiiski (Finland) Tero Vilen	6–4, 6–4
5.	May 2003	Italy F6, Valdengo	Clay	(Brazil) Alexandre Simoni	(Italy) Francesco Aldi (Italy) Giancarlo Petrazzuolo	w/o
6.	Jun 2005	Finland F2, Vierumäki	Clay	(Estonia) Mait Künnap	(Germany) Benedikt Dorsch (Germany) Mischa Zverev	6–3, 6–3

== See also ==
- List of Finland Davis Cup team representatives
