= Juan Antonio Marín =

Spanish-Costa Rican tennis player

- Country (sports): Spain; Costa Rica
- Born: 2 March 1975 (age 50); San Jose, Costa Rica
- Height: 1.75 m (5 ft 9 in)
- Turned pro: 1996
- Retired: 2007
- Plays: Right-handed (two-handed backhand)
- Prize money: $1,210,290

Singles
- Career record: 81–122
- Career titles: 1
- Highest ranking: No. 55 (11 October 1999)

Grand Slam singles results
- Australian Open: 1R (1998, 1999, 2000, 2006)
- French Open: 1R (1998, 1999, 2000, 2001, 2006)
- Wimbledon: 1R (1997, 1998, 1999, 2000)
- US Open: 1R (1997, 1998, 1999, 2000)

Other tournaments
- Olympic Games: 1R (2000)

Doubles
- Career record: 9–16
- Career titles: 0
- Highest ranking: No. 188 (12 February 2007)
- Last updated on: 24 April 2022.

Juan Antonio Marín Casero (born 2 March 1975) is a former professional male tennis player from Costa Rica, who represented the Central American nation at the 2000 Summer Olympics in Sydney.

He originally played on tour under the Spanish flag, as he was born to a father from Murcia and a mother from Asturias, and lived in Spain since the age of 14. However, in May 1998 he began representing Costa Rica.

In October 1999, Marín reached his career-high singles ranking of world No. 55. Previously that year he came close to beating the then-world No. 2 Pete Sampras at the 1999 French Open, with the American eventually winning 6–7, 6–4, 7–5, 6–7, 6–4. He never won a Grand Slam main draw match, despite appearing in 17.

== ATP career finals ==
=== Singles: 2 (1 title, 1 runner-up) ===
| Legend Grand Slam Tournaments (0–0) ATP World Tour Finals (0–0) ATP Masters 1000 Series (0–0) ATP 500 Series (0–0) ATP 250 Series (1–1) | Finals by surface Hard (0–0) Clay (1–1) Grass (0–0) Carpet (0–0) | Finals by setting Outdoors (1–1) Indoors (0–0) |

| Result | W–L | Date | Tournament | Tier | Surface | Opponent | Score |
|---|---|---|---|---|---|---|---|
| Loss | 0–1 | Jul 1997 | Båstad, Sweden | World Series | Clay | (Sweden) Magnus Norman | 5–7, 2–6 |
| Win | 1–1 | Jul 1999 | Båstad, Sweden | World Series | Clay | (Sweden) Andreas Vinciguerra | 6–4, 7–6^{(7–4)} |

== ATP Challenger and ITF Futures finals ==
=== Singles: 13 (5–8) ===
| Legend ATP Challenger (5–8) ITF Futures (0–0) | Finals by surface Hard (0–2) Clay (5–6) Grass (0–0) Carpet (0–0) |

| Result | W–L | Date | Tournament | Tier | Surface | Opponent | Score |
|---|---|---|---|---|---|---|---|
| Win | 1-0 | Aug 1996 | Samarkand, Uzbekistan | Challenger | Clay | (Netherlands) Sander Groen | 6–2, 6–4 |
| Loss | 1-1 | Feb 1997 | Punta del Este, Uruguay | Challenger | Clay | (Italy) Marco Meneschincheri | 7–6, 1–6, 4–6 |
| Loss | 1-2 | Apr 1997 | Split, Croatia | Challenger | Clay | (Romania) Dinu-Mihai Pescariu | 6–3, 2–6, 1–6 |
| Loss | 1-3 | Oct 1997 | Barcelona, Spain | Challenger | Clay | (Spain) Carlos Costa | 1–6, 4–6 |
| Loss | 1-4 | Feb 1998 | Singapore, Singapore | Challenger | Hard | (Spain) Fernando Vicente | 4–6, 4–6 |
| Loss | 1-5 | Mar 1998 | Ho Chi Minh City, Vietnam | Challenger | Hard | (Brazil) André Sá | 3–6, 6–3, 2–6 |
| Loss | 1-6 | Sep 1999 | Szczecin, Poland | Challenger | Clay | (Sweden) Andreas Vinciguerra | 2–6, 4–6 |
| Loss | 1-7 | Oct 2000 | Lima, Peru | Challenger | Clay | (Argentina) Guillermo Coria | 0–6, 6–7^{(7–9)} |
| Loss | 1-8 | Jul 2001 | Lugano, Switzerland | Challenger | Clay | (Czech Republic) Jiří Vaněk | 2–6, 3–6 |
| Win | 2-8 | Aug 2001 | San Marino, San Marino | Challenger | Clay | (Austria) Markus Hipfl | 6–2, 2–6, 7–6^{(7–3)} |
| Win | 3-8 | Sep 2004 | Genoa, Italy | Challenger | Clay | (Argentina) Edgardo Massa | 7–5, 6–4 |
| Win | 4-8 | Aug 2005 | San Marino, San Marino | Challenger | Clay | (Croatia) Saša Tuksar | 6–2, 6–4 |
| Win | 5-8 | Oct 2005 | Rome, Italy | Challenger | Clay | (Spain) Albert Montañés | 6–2, 7–6^{(8–6)} |

=== Doubles: 3 (1–2) ===
| Legend ATP Challenger (1–2) ITF Futures (0–0) | Finals by surface Hard (0–0) Clay (1–2) Grass (0–0) Carpet (0–0) |

| Result | W–L | Date | Tournament | Tier | Surface | Partner | Opponents | Score |
|---|---|---|---|---|---|---|---|---|
| Loss | 0-1 | Sep 1996 | Seville, Spain | Challenger | Clay | (Italy) Fabio Maggi | (Sweden) Ola Kristiansson (Belgium) Tom Vanhoudt | 0–6, 7–6, 1–6 |
| Loss | 0-2 | Mar 2002 | Olbia, Italy | Challenger | Clay | (Spain) Sergi Bruguera | (Italy) Filippo Messori (Italy) Vincenzo Santopadre | 6–3, 4–6, 4–6 |
| Win | 1-2 | Nov 2005 | Guayaquil, Ecuador | Challenger | Clay | (Argentina) Juan Martín del Potro | (Peru) Luis Horna (Peru) Iván Miranda | walkover |

== Performance timeline ==
Key
| W | F | SF | QF | #R | RR | Q# | DNQ | A | NH |

(W) winner; (F) finalist; (SF) semifinalist; (QF) quarterfinalist; (#R) rounds 4, 3, 2, 1; (RR) round-robin stage; (Q#) qualification round; (DNQ) did not qualify; (A) absent; (NH) not held; (SR) strike rate (events won / competed); (W–L) win–loss record.

=== Singles ===
| Tournament | 1996 | 1997 | 1998 | 1999 | 2000 | 2001 | 2002 | 2003 | 2004 | 2005 | 2006 | 2007 | SR | W–L | Win % |
|---|---|---|---|---|---|---|---|---|---|---|---|---|---|---|---|
Grand Slam tournaments
| Australian Open | A | A | 1R | 1R | 1R | A | Q2 | A | Q1 | A | 1R | A | 0 / 4 | 0–4 | 0% |
| French Open | Q2 | Q2 | 1R | 1R | 1R | 1R | Q2 | Q1 | A | Q2 | 1R | A | 0 / 5 | 0–5 | 0% |
| Wimbledon | A | 1R | 1R | 1R | 1R | A | A | A | A | Q2 | A | Q1 | 0 / 4 | 0–4 | 0% |
| US Open | A | 1R | 1R | 1R | 1R | A | A | A | A | A | A | A | 0 / 4 | 0–4 | 0% |
| Win–loss | 0–0 | 0–2 | 0–4 | 0–4 | 0–4 | 0–1 | 0–0 | 0–0 | 0–0 | 0–0 | 0–2 | 0–0 | 0 / 17 | 0–17 | 0% |
ATP World Tour Masters 1000
| Miami | A | A | A | 3R | 1R | A | A | A | A | A | A | A | 0 / 2 | 2–2 | 50% |
| Monte Carlo | A | A | A | A | Q2 | A | Q1 | A | A | A | A | A | 0 / 0 | 0–0 | – |
| Hamburg | Q3 | A | A | A | A | A | A | A | A | A | Q1 | A | 0 / 0 | 0–0 | – |
| Rome | A | A | A | Q2 | Q2 | A | A | A | A | A | Q2 | A | 0 / 0 | 0–0 | – |
| Win–loss | 0–0 | 0–0 | 0–0 | 2–1 | 0–1 | 0–0 | 0–0 | 0–0 | 0–0 | 0–0 | 0–0 | 0–0 | 0 / 2 | 2–2 | 50% |
