= Markus Hipfl =

Austrian tennis player

- Country (sports): Austria
- Residence: Monte Carlo, Monaco
- Born: 26 April 1978 (age 48) Wels, Austria
- Height: 1.78 m (5 ft 10 in)
- Turned pro: 1995
- Retired: 2008
- Plays: Right-handed (two-handed backhand)
- Prize money: $787,415

Singles
- Career record: 65–81
- Career titles: 2 Challenger, 0 Futures
- Highest ranking: No. 63 (18 February 2002)

Grand Slam singles results
- Australian Open: 2R (2002)
- French Open: 2R (2000)
- Wimbledon: 1R (1999, 2000, 2001, 2002)
- US Open: 2R (1999)

Doubles
- Career record: 1–13
- Career titles: 0 Challenger, 0 Futures
- Highest ranking: No. 381 (1 May 2000)
- Last updated on: 14 May 2022.

Markus Hipfl (born 26 April 1978) is a tennis coach and former professional player from Austria. He is the coach of his nephew Nico Hipfl and was the coach of Aleksandr Shevchenko.

== Personal life ==
He is the uncle of tennis professional player Nico Hipfl.

== Career ==
Hipfl had a noteworthy junior career. He won the Under-16s Orange Bowl in 1994 and was also a finalist in that year's European Championship. In 1996 he finished runner-up in the 1996 US Open Boys' Singles, losing in the final to German Daniel Elsner.

In 1999, Hipfl broke into the top 100 for the first time on 3 May 1999. He made the semifinals Grand Prix Hassan II in of Morocco, and the quarterfinals at four tournaments, in San Marino, Sankt Pölten, Sicily and Majorca.

His best performances in 2000 included being a semifinalist at the Swedish Open and making another quarterfinal appearance in the International Raiffeisen Grand Prix in St. Pölten, Austria. Hipfl bettered his previous two efforts at the St. Pölten tournament in 2001, making it into the final as a wildcard, which he lost to fellow wildcard Andrea Gaudenzi. He also reached quarterfinals at the 2001 Copa AT&T and the 2001 Estoril Open. In 2002, he reached another quarterfinal at the Raiffeisen Grand Prix and was also at the 2002 BellSouth Open, after which he attained his career high singles ranking of world No. 63 on 18 February 2002.

At Grand Slams during his career he won a total of three matches, all in separate tournaments. His wins came against Andrew Ilie at the 1999 US Open, Nicolas Mahut in the 2000 French Open and Nikolay Davydenko at the 2002 Australian Open. He competed in four successive Wimbledon Championships from 1999 to 2002 but on each occasion lost in the opening round by five sets. The closest he got to registering a win was in 2002 when he lost 9–11 in the final set, to French qualifier Nicolas Thomann, despite serving 38 aces.

He took part in five ATP World Tour Masters 1000 tournaments during his career, only once failing to get past the first round. In both the 2001 and 2002 Monte-Carlo Masters he defeated Yevgeny Kafelnikov, the second time coming when the Russian was the third-ranked player in the ATP rankings.

Hipfl also played in seven Davis Cup ties for the Austrian team and had a 10–3 record, all in singles. In 1999, he helped Austria qualify for the following year's World Group with a straight sets win over Sweden's Magnus Gustafsson, in the fifth and decisive rubber. He had earlier upset world number 23 Magnus Norman.

== Junior Grand Slam finals ==
=== Singles: 1 (1 runner-up) ===
| Result | Year | Tournament | Surface | Opponent | Score |
|---|---|---|---|---|---|
| Loss | 1996 | US Open | Hard | (Germany) Daniel Elsner | 3–6, 2–6 |

== ATP career finals ==
=== Singles: 1 (1 runner-up) ===
| Legend Grand Slam Tournaments (0–0) ATP World Tour Finals (0–0) ATP Masters Series (0–0) ATP Championship Series (0–0) ATP World Series (0–1) | Finals by surface Hard (0–0) Clay (0–1) Grass (0–0) Carpet (0–0) | Finals by setting Outdoors (0–1) Indoors (0–0) |

| Result | W–L | Date | Tournament | Tier | Surface | Opponent | Score |
|---|---|---|---|---|---|---|---|
| Loss | 0–1 | May 2001 | St. Pölten, Austria | International Series | Clay | (Italy) Andrea Gaudenzi | 0–6, 5–7 |

== ATP Challenger and ITF Futures finals ==
=== Singles: 8 (2–6) ===
| Legend ATP Challenger (2–6) ITF Futures (0–0) | Finals by surface Hard (0–1) Clay (2–5) Grass (0–0) Carpet (0–0) |

| Result | W–L | Date | Tournament | Tier | Surface | Opponent | Score |
|---|---|---|---|---|---|---|---|
| Win | 1–0 | Aug 1998 | Nettingsdorf, Austria | Challenger | Clay | (Austria) Clemens Trimmel | 6–2, 6–0 |
| Win | 2–0 | Dec 1998 | Guadalajara, Mexico | Challenger | Clay | (Morocco) Younes El Aynaoui | 6–7, 7–6, 7–6 |
| Loss | 2–1 | Feb 1999 | Ho Chi Minh City, Vietnam | Challenger | Hard | (Netherlands) John Van Lottum | 6–7, 2–6 |
| Loss | 2–2 | May 1999 | Espinho, Portugal | Challenger | Clay | (Argentina) Gastón Gaudio | 4–6, 1–6 |
| Loss | 2–3 | Aug 1999 | Nettingsdorf, Austria | Challenger | Clay | (Hungary) Attila Sávolt | 1–6, 0–6 |
| Loss | 2–4 | Apr 2001 | Barletta, Italy | Challenger | Clay | (Spain) Félix Mantilla | 3–6, 0–1 ret. |
| Loss | 2–5 | Aug 2001 | San Marino, San Marino | Challenger | Clay | (Costa Rica) Juan Antonio Marín | 2–6, 6–2, 6–7^{(3–7)} |
| Loss | 2–6 | Aug 2001 | Linz, Austria | Challenger | Clay | (Czech Republic) Jan Vacek | 6–1, 1–6, 2–6 |

=== Doubles: 1 (0–1) ===
| Legend ATP Challenger (0–0) ITF Futures (0–1) | Finals by surface Hard (0–0) Clay (0–1) Grass (0–0) Carpet (0–0) |

| Result | W–L | Date | Tournament | Tier | Surface | Partner | Opponents | Score |
|---|---|---|---|---|---|---|---|---|
| Loss | 0–1 | Jun 2008 | Slovenia F2, Maribor | Futures | Clay | (Austria) Marco Mirnegg | (Belgium) Ruben Bemelmans (Belgium) Bart De Keersmaeker | 1–6, 3–6 |

== Performance timeline ==
Key
| W | F | SF | QF | #R | RR | Q# | DNQ | A | NH |

(W) winner; (F) finalist; (SF) semifinalist; (QF) quarterfinalist; (#R) rounds 4, 3, 2, 1; (RR) round-robin stage; (Q#) qualification round; (DNQ) did not qualify; (A) absent; (NH) not held; (SR) strike rate (events won / competed); (W–L) win–loss record.

=== Singles ===
| Tournament | 1997 | 1998 | 1999 | 2000 | 2001 | 2002 | 2003 | 2004 | SR | W–L | Win % |
|---|---|---|---|---|---|---|---|---|---|---|---|
Grand Slam tournaments
| Australian Open | A | Q2 | 1R | 1R | A | 2R | A | Q1 | 0 / 3 | 1–3 | 25% |
| French Open | Q1 | A | 1R | 2R | 1R | 1R | Q1 | A | 0 / 4 | 1–4 | 20% |
| Wimbledon | A | A | 1R | 1R | 1R | 1R | A | A | 0 / 4 | 0–4 | 0% |
| US Open | A | A | 2R | 1R | 1R | A | Q1 | A | 0 / 3 | 1–3 | 25% |
| Win–loss | 0–0 | 0–0 | 1–4 | 1–4 | 0–3 | 1–3 | 0–0 | 0–0 | 0 / 14 | 3–14 | 18% |
ATP World Tour Masters 1000
| Indian Wells | A | A | A | Q1 | A | Q1 | A | A | 0 / 0 | 0–0 | – |
| Miami | A | A | A | 1R | 2R | A | A | A | 0 / 2 | 1–2 | 33% |
| Monte Carlo | A | A | A | Q2 | 2R | 2R | Q1 | A | 0 / 2 | 2–2 | 50% |
| Hamburg | A | A | A | A | Q1 | Q2 | A | A | 0 / 0 | 0–0 | – |
| Rome | A | A | A | A | Q1 | 2R | A | A | 0 / 1 | 1–1 | 50% |
| Stuttgart | A | A | A | A | Q1 | Not Held | | | 0 / 0 | 0–0 | – |
| Paris | A | A | A | A | Q1 | A | A | A | 0 / 0 | 0–0 | – |
| Win–loss | 0–0 | 0–0 | 0–0 | 0–1 | 2–2 | 2–2 | 0–0 | 0–0 | 0 / 5 | 4–5 | 44% |
