= 1998 International Tennis Championships – Doubles =

Doubles
- 1998 International Tennis Championships

Final
- Champions: (South Africa) Grant Stafford (Zimbabwe) Kevin Ullyett
- Runners-up: (The Bahamas) Mark Merklein (United States) Vincent Spadea
- Score: 7–5, 6–4

Details
- Draw: 16
- Seeds: 4

Events
Singles	Doubles
← 1997 ·	Delray Beach Open	· 1999 →

Dave Randall and Greg Van Emburgh were the defending champions, but did not participate together this year. Randall partnered Jean-Philippe Fleurian, losing in the first round. Van Emburgh partnered Geoff Grant, losing in the first round.

Grant Stafford and Kevin Ullyett won in the final 7–5, 6–4, against Mark Merklein and Vincent Spadea.

== Seeds ==
1. (United States) Luke Jensen / (United States) Murphy Jensen (first round)
2. (Australia) Michael Tebbutt / (Sweden) Mikael Tillström (quarterfinals)
3. (United States) Brandon Coupe / (United States) Jack Waite (quarterfinals)
4. (South Africa) Grant Stafford / (Zimbabwe) Kevin Ullyett (champions)

== Draw ==
=== Key ===
- Q = Qualifier
- WC = Wild card
- LL = Lucky loser
- Alt = Alternate
- ITF = ITF entry
- PR = Protected ranking
- SR = Special ranking
- SE = Special exempt
- JE = Junior exempt
- JR = Junior Accelerator Programme entrant
- CO = College Accelerator Programme entrant
- NG = Next Gen Accelerator Program entrant
- w/o = Walkover
- r = Retired
- d = Defaulted

=== Draw ===
First round
1	(United States) L Jensen (United States) M Jensen	3	7	4
WC	(The Bahamas) M Merklein (United States) V Spadea	6	6	6
WC	(United States) J Kriek (United States) M Purcell	4	2
(South Africa) B Haygarth (United States) K Kinnear	6	6
3	(United States) B Coupe (United States) J Waite	6	7
WC	(United States) D DiLucia (Armenia) S Sargsian	4	6
Q	(United States) P McEnroe (United States) J Palmer	6	7
(United States) D Flach (United States) D Witt	1	5
(Netherlands) T Nijssen (Belgium) T Vanhoudt	6	7	6
(Zimbabwe) W Black (Venezuela) M Ruah	7	6	4
(United States) J Gimelstob (United States) M Keil	4	1
4	(South Africa) G Stafford (Zimbabwe) K Ullyett	6	6
(United States) G Grant (United States) G Van Emburgh	4	6	2
(Belgium) L Pimek (South Africa) B Talbot	6	4	6
(France) J-P Fleurian (United States) D Randall	6	4
2	(Australia) M Tebbutt (Sweden) M Tillström	7	6

Quarterfinals
WC	(The Bahamas) M Merklein (United States) V Spadea	6	6
(South Africa) B Haygarth (United States) K Kinnear	4	2
3	(United States) B Coupe (United States) J Waite	4	1
Q	(United States) P McEnroe (United States) J Palmer	6	6
(Netherlands) T Nijssen (Belgium) T Vanhoudt	3	6	2
4	(South Africa) G Stafford (Zimbabwe) K Ullyett	6	3	6
(Belgium) L Pimek (South Africa) B Talbot	4	6	6
2	(Australia) M Tebbutt (Sweden) M Tillström	6	3	3

Semifinals
WC	(The Bahamas) M Merklein (United States) V Spadea	7	6	7
Q	(United States) P McEnroe (United States) J Palmer	6	7	6
4	(South Africa) G Stafford (Zimbabwe) K Ullyett	3	6	7
(Belgium) L Pimek (South Africa) B Talbot	6	4	6

Final
WC	(The Bahamas) M Merklein (United States) V Spadea	5	4
4	(South Africa) G Stafford (Zimbabwe) K Ullyett	7	6
