= 1997 ATP Challenger Series =

Tennis tour

Details
- Duration: 6 January 1997 – 14 December 1997
- Edition: 20th
- Tournaments: 107

Achievements (singles)

The ATP Challenger Series is the second tier tour for professional tennis organised by the Association of Tennis Professionals (ATP). The 1997 ATP Challenger Series calendar comprised 107 tournaments, with prize money ranging from $25,000 up to $125,000.

== Schedule ==
=== January ===
Date	Country	Tournament	Prizemoney	Surface	Singles champion	Doubles champions
06.01.	Singapore	Singapore Challenger	$ 50,000	Hard (i)	(Russia) Andrei Cherkasov	(India) Mahesh Bhupathi (India) Leander Paes
20.01.	Germany	Heilbronn Open	$ 100,000	Carpet (i)	(Sweden) Henrik Holm	(France) Olivier Delaître (France) Stéphane Simian
27.01.	Germany	Lippstadt Challenger	$ 25,000	Carpet (i)	(Germany) Arne Thoms	(Sweden) Henrik Holm (Sweden) Nils Holm

=== February ===
Date	Country	Tournament	Prizemoney	Surface	Singles champion	Doubles champions
03.02.	Germany	Volkswagen Challenger	$ 25,000	Carpet (i)	(Germany) Jens Knippschild	(Italy) Nicola Bruno (Italy) Laurence Tieleman
10.02.	Germany	Warsteiner Challenger Lübeck	$ 25,000	Carpet (i)	(United States) Geoff Grant	(Germany) Mathias Huning (Netherlands) Joost Winnink
17.02.	France	Cherbourg Challenger	$ 25,000	Carpet (i)	(Denmark) Frederik Fetterlein	(Belarus) Max Mirnyi (Zimbabwe) Kevin Ullyett
17.02.	Japan	Kyoto Challenger	$ 25,000	Carpet (i)	(Germany) Carsten Arriens	(India) Mahesh Bhupathi (Zimbabwe) Wayne Black
17.02.	Uruguay	Punta del Este Challenger	$ 25,000	Clay	(Italy) Marco Meneschincheri	(Argentina) Daniel Orsanic (Argentina) Martín Rodríguez
24.02.	Ecuador	Salinas Challenger	$ 50,000	Hard	(Germany) Oliver Gross	(Brazil) Fernando Meligeni (Brazil) André Sá
24.02.	Germany	Residenza Open Magdeburg	$ 25,000	Carpet (i)	(Czech Republic) Petr Luxa	(United States) Trey Phillips (United Kingdom) Chris Wilkinson

=== March ===
Date	Country	Tournament	Prizemoney	Surface	Singles champion	Doubles champions
03.03.	United States	Indian Wells Challenger	$ 50,000	Hard	(Czech Republic) Jiří Novák	(Sweden) Nicklas Kulti (Australia) Michael Tebbutt
31.03.	Italy	Barletta Challenger	$ 25,000	Clay	(Spain) Carlos Costa	(Portugal) Nuno Marques (Belgium) Tom Vanhoudt
31.03.	Mexico	Puerto Vallarta Challenger	$ 25,000	Hard	(Russia) Andrei Merinov	(Mexico) Alejandro Hernández (Mexico) Óscar Ortiz

=== April ===
Date	Country	Tournament	Prizemoney	Surface	Singles champion	Doubles champions
07.04.	Bermuda	XL Bermuda Open	$ 125,000	Clay	(Belgium) Johan Van Herck	(Argentina) Javier Frana (The Bahamas) Mark Knowles
07.04.	Italy	Napoli Challenger	$ 75,000	Clay	(Romania) Dinu Pescariu	(North Macedonia) Aleksandar Kitinov (Belgium) Tom Vanhoudt
14.04.	United States	Birmingham Challenger	$ 50,000	Clay	(Belgium) Johan Van Herck	(United States) Luke Jensen (United States) Murphy Jensen
14.04.	Croatia	Split Challenger	$ 50,000	Clay	(Romania) Dinu Pescariu	(United States) Devin Bowen (Romania) Dinu Pescariu
21.04.	Czech Republic	Prague Challenger	$ 25,000	Clay	(Spain) Albert Portas	(India) Mahesh Bhupathi (India) Leander Paes

=== May ===
Date	Country	Tournament	Prizemoney	Surface	Singles champion	Doubles champions
05.05.	Slovenia	Ljubljana Challenger	$ 125,000	Clay	(New Zealand) Brett Steven	(Argentina) Lucas Arnold Ker (Argentina) Daniel Orsanic
05.05.	Slovakia	Bratislava Challenger	$ 50,000	Clay	(France) Sébastien Grosjean	(United States) Jared Palmer (South Africa) Christo van Rensburg
05.05.	Israel	Jerusalem Challenger	$ 50,000	Hard	(Zimbabwe) Wayne Black	(India) Mahesh Bhupathi (India) Leander Paes
12.05.	Slovakia	Košice Challenger	$ 125,000	Clay	(Slovakia) Dominik Hrbatý	(Australia) Pat Cash (United States) Andrew Kratzmann
12.05.	Brazil	Curitiba Challenger	$ 50,000	Clay	(Brazil) Gustavo Kuerten	(United States) Glenn Weiner (Austria) Herbert Wiltschnig
12.05.	Germany	Ostdeutscher Sparkassen Cup	$ 50,000	Clay	(Belgium) Dick Norman	(The Bahamas) Mark Merklein (United States) Jeff Salzenstein
19.05.	Hungary	Budapest Challenger I	$ 50,000	Clay	(Australia) Steven Randjelovic	(Portugal) Nuno Marques (Belgium) Tom Vanhoudt

=== June ===
Date	Country	Tournament	Prizemoney	Surface	Singles champion	Doubles champions
03.06.	Czech Republic	Prostějov Challenger	$ 125,000	Clay	(Czech Republic) Bohdan Ulihrach	(Czech Republic) Jiří Novák (Czech Republic) David Rikl
03.06.	Germany	Quelle Cup	$ 50,000	Clay	(Italy) Davide Sanguinetti	(United States) Brandon Coupe (South Africa) Paul Rosner
09.06.	Germany	ATU Cup	$ 25,000	Clay	(Germany) Dirk Dier	(United States) Geoff Grant (United States) Mark Merklein
16.06.	Croatia	Zagreb Challenger	$ 75,000	Clay	(Spain) Alberto Berasategui	(Mexico) David Roditi (Czech Republic) Tomáš Anzari
16.06.	Germany	Wartburg Open	$ 25,000	Clay	(Sweden) Tomas Nydahl	(United States) Geoff Grant (The Bahamas) Mark Merklein
23.06.	Germany	Nord/LB Open	$ 125,000	Clay	(Spain) Francisco Roig	(United States) Brandon Coupe (South Africa) Paul Rosner
30.06.	Italy	Venice Challenger	$ 100,000	Clay	(Spain) Julián Alonso	(Italy) Giorgio Galimberti (Italy) Massimo Valeri
30.06.	United States	Flushing Meadow Challenger	$ 50,000	Hard	(Italy) Gianluca Pozzi	(United States) Geoff Grant (The Bahamas) Mark Merklein
30.06.	Germany	Müller Cup	$ 50,000	Clay	(Romania) Dinu Pescariu	(Belgium) Kris Goossens (Belgium) Tom Vanhoudt
30.06.	France	Montauban Challenger	$ 25,000	Clay	(France) Olivier Mutis	(Italy) Gabrio Castrichella (Italy) Daniele Musa

=== July ===
Date	Country	Tournament	Prizemoney	Surface	Singles champion	Doubles champions
07.07.	Romania	Brașov Challenger	$ 50,000	Clay	(Romania) Ionuț Moldovan	(Romania) George Cosac (United Kingdom) Miles Maclagan
07.07.	Great Britain	Bristol Challenger	$ 50,000	Grass	(Italy) Stefano Pescosolido	Not completed
07.07.	Canada	Granby Challenger	$ 50,000	Hard	(Zimbabwe) Wayne Black	(Australia) Grant Doyle (The Bahamas) Mark Merklein
07.07.	Colombia	Cali Challenger	$ 25,000	Clay	(Paraguay) Ramón Delgado	(Argentina) Eduardo Medica (Argentina) Mariano Puerta
07.07.	Germany	Oberstaufen Cup	$ 25,000	Clay	(Italy) Davide Sanguinetti	(Spain) Juan Ignacio Carrasco (Spain) Jordi Mas
14.07.	France	Contrexéville Challenger	$ 75,000	Clay	(Spain) Julián Alonso	(Czech Republic) Petr Luxa (Czech Republic) David Škoch
14.07.	United States	Aptos Challenger	$ 50,000	Hard	(United States) Jan-Michael Gambill	(Canada) Sébastien Leblanc (Canada) Jocelyn Robichaud
14.07.	Great Britain	Manchester Challenger	$ 50,000	Grass	(Spain) Óscar Burrieza	(United Kingdom) Mark Petchey (United Kingdom) Danny Sapsford
14.07.	Ecuador	Quito Challenger	$ 50,000	Clay	(Argentina) Mariano Puerta	(Mexico) Bernardo Martínez (Mexico) Marco Osorio
14.07.	Netherlands	Scheveningen Challenger	$ 50,000	Clay	(Romania) Ionuț Moldovan	(Spain) Álex Calatrava (Belgium) Tom Vanhoudt
14.07.	Austria	Pörtschach Challenger	$ 25,000	Clay	(Belgium) Christophe Van Garsse	(Australia) Jaymon Crabb (Sweden) Mikael Stadling
21.07.	Belgium	Ostend Challenger	$ 75,000	Clay	(Spain) Jordi Burillo	(Belgium) Kris Goossens (Belgium) Tom Vanhoudt
21.07.	Great Britain	Newcastle Challenger	$ 50,000	Clay	(France) Fabrice Santoro	(Spain) Óscar Burrieza (Switzerland) Filippo Veglio
21.07.	Finland	Tampere Challenger	$ 50,000	Clay	(Hungary) Attila Sávolt	(France) Cyril Buscaglione (France) Régis Lavergne
21.07.	United States	Winnetka Challenger	$ 50,000	Hard	(Italy) Gianluca Pozzi	(United States) Michael Sell (South Africa) Myles Wakefield
28.07.	Poland	Poznań Challenger	$ 125,000	Clay	(United States) Jeff Tarango	(Czech Republic) David Rikl (Czech Republic) Tomáš Anzari
28.07.	Italy	Merano Challenger	$ 100,000	Clay	(Argentina) Lucas Arnold Ker	(Argentina) Mariano Hood (Argentina) Sebastián Prieto
28.07.	Turkey	Istanbul Challenger	$ 50,000	Hard	(France) Jean-Philippe Fleurian	(Portugal) João Cunha e Silva (France) Jean-Philippe Fleurian
28.07.	United States	Lexington Challenger	$ 50,000	Hard	(Zimbabwe) Wayne Black	(Zimbabwe) Wayne Black (United States) Brian MacPhie

=== August ===
Date	Country	Tournament	Prizemoney	Surface	Singles champion	Doubles champions
04.08.	Spain	Open Castilla y León	$ 100,000	Hard	(Spain) Jordi Burillo	(Portugal) João Cunha e Silva (Portugal) Nuno Marques
04.08.	United States	Binghamton Challenger	$ 25,000	Hard	(United States) David Witt	(United States) Brian MacPhie (United States) Jeff Salzenstein
04.08.	Brazil	Belo Horizonte Challenger	$ 25,000	Hard	(Brazil) Roberto Jabali	(Romania) Gabriel Trifu (United States) Glenn Weiner
04.08.	Czech Republic	Pilzen Challenger	$ 25,000	Clay	(Italy) Vincenzo Santopadre	(Czech Republic) Petr Luxa (Slovenia) Borut Urh
11.08.	Austria	Graz Challenger	$ 125,000	Clay	(Czech Republic) Radomír Vašek	(Argentina) Lucas Arnold Ker (Belgium) Tom Vanhoudt
11.08.	United States	Bronx Challenger	$ 50,000	Hard	(United States) Michael Sell	(Brazil) Nelson Aerts (Brazil) André Sá
11.08.	Italy	Olbia Challenger	$ 50,000	Hard	(Italy) Diego Nargiso	(United States) Geoff Grant (Venezuela) Maurice Ruah
18.08.	Switzerland	Geneva Challenger	$ 50,000	Clay	(Italy) Andrea Gaudenzi	(Argentina) Diego del Río (Argentina) Mariano Puerta
18.08.	Austria	Nettingsdorf Challenger	$ 25,000	Clay	(Czech Republic) Radomír Vašek	(Germany) Björn Jacob (Germany) Michael Kohlmann
25.08.	Germany	Alpirsbach Challenger	$ 25,000	Clay	(Italy) Fabio Maggi	(Germany) Mathias Huning (Australia) Grant Silcock
25.08.	Bolivia	Santa Cruz Challenger	$ 25,000	Clay	(Argentina) Guillermo Cañas	(Argentina) Mariano Hood (Argentina) Sebastián Prieto

=== September ===
Date	Country	Tournament	Prizemoney	Surface	Singles champion	Doubles champions
01.09.	Portugal	Azores Challenger	$ 50,000	Hard	(Italy) Cristiano Caratti	(Russia) Andrei Cherkasov (Argentina) Gastón Etlis
01.09.	Great Britain	Edinburgh Challenger	$ 50,000	Clay	(Romania) Dinu Pescariu	(Australia) Wayne Arthurs (Australia) Grant Doyle
01.09.	Mexico	Guadalajara Challenger I	$ 25,000	Clay	(Mexico) Alejandro Hernández	(Brazil) Nelson Aerts (Brazil) André Sá
08.09.	Portugal	Espinho Challenger	$ 100,000	Clay	(Russia) Marat Safin	(Spain) Juan Ignacio Carrasco (Spain) Álex López Morón
08.09.	Hungary	Budapest Challenger II	$ 50,000	Clay	(Norway) Jan Frode Andersen	(Federal Republic of Yugoslavia) Nebojša Đorđević (Federal Republic of Yugoslavia) Dušan Vemić
15.09.	Poland	Szczecin Challenger	$ 125,000	Clay	(Australia) Richard Fromberg	(Netherlands) Tom Kempers (Argentina) Daniel Orsanic
15.09.	United States	Urbana Challenger	$ 50,000	Hard	(United Kingdom) Andrew Richardson	(United States) Michael Sell (South Africa) Kevin Ullyett
22.09.	Brazil	São Paulo Challenger	$ 100,000	Clay	(Argentina) Lucas Arnold Ker	(Brazil) Nelson Aerts (Mexico) Bernardo Martínez
22.09.	United States	Delray Beach Challenger	$ 50,000	Hard	(United States) Todd Martin	(United States) Michael Sell (Zimbabwe) Kevin Ullyett
22.09.	Spain	Copa Sevilla	$ 25,000	Clay	(Spain) Álex Calatrava	(Finland) Tuomas Ketola (Germany) Michael Kohlmann
22.09.	North Macedonia	Skopje Challenger	$ 25,000	Clay	(Federal Republic of Yugoslavia) Dušan Vemić	(Austria) Thomas Buchmayer (Austria) Thomas Strengberger
29.09.	Chile	Santiago Challenger	$ 100,000	Clay	(Argentina) Guillermo Cañas	(Argentina) Lucas Arnold Ker (Brazil) Jaime Oncins
29.09.	Spain	Mallorca Challenger	$ 50,000	Clay	(Spain) Álex López Morón	(Italy) Massimo Ardinghi (France) Guillaume Marx
29.09.	United States	San Antonio Challenger	$ 50,000	Hard	(Canada) Daniel Nestor	(United States) Doug Flach (United States) Jeff Salzenstein

=== October ===
Date	Country	Tournament	Prizemoney	Surface	Singles champion	Doubles champions
06.10.	Spain	Barcelona Challenger	$ 100,000	Clay	(Spain) Carlos Costa	(Egypt) Tamer El-Sawy (Portugal) Nuno Marques
06.10.	Peru	Lima Challenger	$ 100,000	Clay	(Sweden) Tomas Nydahl	(Argentina) Mariano Hood (Argentina) Sebastián Prieto
06.10.	United States	Sedona Challenger	$ 50,000	Hard	(United States) Michael Sell	(South Africa) John-Laffnie de Jager (South Africa) Robbie Koenig
13.10.	Egypt	Cairo Challenger	$ 100,000	Clay	(Spain) Alberto Berasategui	(Spain) Tomás Carbonell (Spain) Francisco Roig
13.10.	Ecuador	Challenger Ciudad de Guayaquil	$ 100,000	Clay	(Sweden) Tomas Nydahl	(Hungary) Gábor Köves (Sweden) Tomas Nydahl
20.10.	France	Brest Challenger	$ 100,000	Hard (i)	(Belgium) Johan Van Herck	(United States) Dave Randall (United States) Jack Waite
20.10.	South Korea	Seoul Challenger	$ 50,000	Clay	(Australia) Peter Tramacchi	(Netherlands) Edwin Kempes (Japan) Gouichi Motomura
20.10.	Germany	Okal Cup	$ 25,000	Carpet (i)	(Germany) Rainer Schüttler	(Germany) Lars Rehmann (Germany) Rainer Schüttler
27.10.	Germany	Lambertz Open by STAWAG	$ 50,000	Hard (i)	(Germany) Hendrik Dreekmann	(South Africa) John-Laffnie de Jager (South Africa) Chris Haggard

=== November ===
Date	Country	Tournament	Prizemoney	Surface	Singles champion	Doubles champions
03.11.	Germany	Neumünster Challenger	$ 25,000	Carpet (i)	(Belgium) Dick Norman	(South Africa) John-Laffnie de Jager (South Africa) Chris Haggard
03.11.	Mexico	Puebla Challenger	$ 25,000	Hard	(Mexico) Luis Herrera	(Egypt) Tamer El-Sawy (Venezuela) Maurice Ruah
10.11.	Andorra	Andorra Challenger	$ 100,000	Hard (i)	(Italy) Gianluca Pozzi	(France) Nicolas Escudé (France) Jérôme Golmard
10.11.	Puerto Rico	Río Grande Challenger	$ 100,000	Clay	(Argentina) Franco Squillari	(Argentina) Lucas Arnold Ker (Argentina) Daniel Orsanic
10.11.	United States	Las Vegas Challenger	$ 50,000	Hard	(Germany) Christian Vinck	(United States) David DiLucia (United States) Michael Sell
17.11.	Mexico	Guadalajara Challenger II	$ 100,000	Clay	(Morocco) Younes El Aynaoui	(Brazil) Nelson Aerts (Brazil) André Sá
17.11.	United States	Amarillo Challenger	$ 50,000	Hard (i)	(Australia) Peter Tramacchi	(United States) Geoff Grant (The Bahamas) Mark Merklein
17.11.	Slovenia	Portorož Challenger	$ 25,000	Hard (i)	(Bulgaria) Orlin Stanoytchev	(United Kingdom) Danny Sapsford (United Kingdom) Chris Wilkinson
24.11.	Argentina	Buenos Aires Challenger	$ 100,000	Clay	(Argentina) Franco Squillari	(Argentina) Diego del Río (Argentina) Daniel Orsanic
24.11.	United States	Burbank Challenger	$ 50,000	Hard	(United States) Andre Agassi	(United States) Doug Flach (United States) Brian MacPhie
24.11.	Réunion	Réunion Challenger	$ 50,000	Hard	(Sweden) Jan Apell	(South Africa) Clinton Ferreira (Netherlands) Jan Siemerink
24.11.	India	Mumbai Challenger	$ 25,000	Hard	(Japan) Takao Suzuki	(Portugal) Emanuel Couto (Portugal) João Cunha e Silva
24.11.	Mexico	Ixtapa Challenger	$ 25,000	Hard	(United States) Steve Campbell	(South Africa) Chris Haggard (Venezuela) Maurice Ruah

=== December ===
Date	Country	Tournament	Prizemoney	Surface	Singles champion	Doubles champions
01.12.	Germany	Bad Lippspringe Challenger	$ 50,000	Carpet (i)	(Germany) Michael Kohlmann	(Finland) Tuomas Ketola (Germany) Michael Kohlmann
01.12.	India	Ahmedabad Challenger	$ 25,000	Hard	(Uzbekistan) Vadim Kutsenko	(Portugal) Emanuel Couto (Portugal) João Cunha e Silva
08.12.	Israel	Eilat Challenger	$ 50,000	Hard (i)	(Finland) Tuomas Ketola	(Germany) Patrick Baur (Russia) Andrei Cherkasov
08.12.	Australia	Perth Challenger	$ 25,000	Hard	(Australia) Wayne Arthurs	(Australia) Jamie Holmes (Australia) Paul Kilderry
08.12.	Chile	Cerveza Cristal Challenger	$ 25,000	Clay	(Germany) Oliver Gross	(Argentina) Mariano Hood (Argentina) Sebastián Prieto
08.12.	Germany	Wismar Challenger	$ 25,000	Carpet (i)	(Germany) Christian Vinck	(Germany) Lars Burgsmüller (Germany) Michael Kohlmann
