= 1998 International Tennis Championships – Singles =

Singles
- 1998 International Tennis Championships

Final
- Champion: (Australia) Andrew Ilie
- Runner-up: (Italy) Davide Sanguinetti
- Score: 7–5, 6–4

Details
- Draw: 32
- Seeds: 8

Events
Singles	Doubles
← 1997 ·	Delray Beach Open	· 1999 →

Andrew Ilie defeated Davide Sanguinetti 7–5, 6–4 to win the 1998 International Tennis Championships singles event. Jason Stoltenberg was the defending champion.

== Seeds ==
1. (Australia) Jason Stoltenberg (first round)
2. (United States) Vincent Spadea (second round)
3. (Romania) Andrei Pavel (first round)
4. (Zimbabwe) Wayne Black (second round)
5. (Sweden) Mikael Tillström (second round)
6. (United States) Steve Campbell (second round)
7. (Spain) Álex Calatrava (first round)
8. (Italy) Davide Sanguinetti (final)

== Draw ==
=== Key ===
- Q = Qualifier
- WC = Wild card
- LL = Lucky loser
- Alt = Alternate
- ITF = ITF entry
- PR = Protected ranking
- SR = Special ranking
- SE = Special exempt
- JE = Junior exempt
- JR = Junior Accelerator Programme entrant
- CO = College Accelerator Programme entrant
- NG = Next Gen Accelerator Program entrant
- w/o = Walkover
- r = Retired
- d = Defaulted

=== Finals ===
Semifinals
(Australia) Andrew Ilie	4	6	6
(United States) Justin Gimelstob	6	1	4
(Belgium) Johan van Herck	3	4
8	(Italy) Davide Sanguinetti	6	6

Final
(Australia) Andrew Ilie	7	6
8	(Italy) Davide Sanguinetti	5	4

=== Top half ===
First round
1	(Australia) J Stoltenberg	4	5
Q	(Australia) A Ilie	6	7
(Germany) M Craca	7^{7}	4	3
Q	(Haiti) R Agénor	6^{4}	6	6
Q	(United States) D Flach	0	3
(France) S Grosjean	6	6
(Netherlands) D van Scheppingen	6	6
7	(Spain) Á Calatrava	4	4
4	(Zimbabwe) W Black	6	6
WC	(The Bahamas) M Merklein	3	2
(United States) J Gimelstob	6	6
(South Africa) G Stafford	2	4
Q	(Belgium) X Malisse	6	6
(Netherlands) J van Lottum	2	2
(Australia) S Stolle	4	6	1
5	(Sweden) M Tillström	6	3	6

Second round
Q	(Australia) A Ilie	3	6	6
Q	(Haiti) R Agénor	6	4	1
(France) S Grosjean	6	7^{7}
(Netherlands) D van Scheppingen	1	6^{2}
4	(Zimbabwe) W Black	1	2
(United States) J Gimelstob	6	6
Q	(Belgium) X Malisse	6	5	6
5	(Sweden) M Tillström	4	7	3

Quarterfinals
(Australia) A Ilie	6	6^{3}	6
(France) S Grosjean	3	7^{7}	3
(United States) J Gimelstob	6	4	6
Q	(Belgium) X Malisse	3	6	3

Semifinals
(Australia) A Ilie	4	6	6
(United States) J Gimelstob	6	1	4

=== Bottom half ===
First round
6	(United States) S Campbell	6	7
(France) A Clément	4	5
(Costa Rica) J Marín	6^{3}	6	2
(Belgium) J van Herck	7^{7}	3	6
(Australia) M Tebbutt	6	6
WC	(United States) M Jensen	3	2
(Argentina) F Squillari	4	7	6
3	(Romania) A Pavel	6	5	3
8	(Italy) D Sanguinetti	3	6	7
(Armenia) S Sargsian	6	3	5
(Germany) C Vinck	6^{5}	1
WC	(United States) P McEnroe	7^{7}	6
(Norway) C Ruud	3	6	1
(Paraguay) R Delgado	6	4	6
(United States) A O'Brien	6	1	4
2	(United States) V Spadea	2	6	6

Second round
6	(United States) S Campbell	5	0
(Belgium) J van Herck	7	6
(Australia) M Tebbutt	6	6
(Argentina) F Squillari	3	3
8	(Italy) D Sanguinetti	6	6
WC	(United States) P McEnroe	3	3
(Paraguay) R Delgado	6	6
2	(United States) V Spadea	4	2

Quarterfinals
(Belgium) J van Herck	6	6
(Australia) M Tebbutt	1	4
8	(Italy) D Sanguinetti	6	6
(Paraguay) R Delgado	4	4

Semifinals
(Belgium) J van Herck	3	4
8	(Italy) D Sanguinetti	6	6
