= 1995 Lipton Championships – Men's doubles =

Men's doubles
- 1995 Lipton Championships

Final
- Champion: (Australia) Todd Woodbridge (Australia) Mark Woodforde
- Runner-up: (United States) Jim Grabb (United States) Patrick McEnroe
- Score: 6–3, 7–6

Events
Singles	men	women
Doubles	men	women
← 1994 ·	Lipton Championships	· 1996 →

Jacco Eltingh and Paul Haarhuis were the defending champions, but lost in the quarterfinals this year.

Todd Woodbridge and Mark Woodforde won the title, defeating Jim Grabb and Patrick McEnroe 6–3, 7–6 in the final.

== Seeds ==
1. (Netherlands) Jacco Eltingh / (Netherlands) Paul Haarhuis (quarterfinals)
2. (Australia) Todd Woodbridge / (Australia) Mark Woodforde (champions)
3. (Canada) Grant Connell / (United States) Patrick Galbraith (semifinals)
4. (Zimbabwe) Byron Black / (United States) Jonathan Stark (semifinals)
5. (Sweden) Jan Apell / (Sweden) Jonas Björkman (second round)
6. (United States) Jared Palmer / (United States) Richey Reneberg (quarterfinals)
7. (South Africa) David Adams / (Russia) Andrei Olhovskiy (third round)
8. (The Bahamas) Mark Knowles / (Canada) Daniel Nestor (quarterfinals)
9. (United States) Jim Grabb / (United States) Patrick McEnroe (final)
10. (Sweden) Nicklas Kulti / (Sweden) Magnus Larsson (second round)
11. (Czech Republic) Cyril Suk / (Czech Republic) Daniel Vacek (second round)
12. (United States) Alex O'Brien / (Australia) Sandon Stolle (third round)
13. (South Africa) Gary Muller / (South Africa) Piet Norval (second round)
14. (United States) Tommy Ho / (New Zealand) Brett Steven (third round)
15. (South Africa) Lan Bale / (South Africa) John-Laffnie de Jager (third round)
16. (Spain) Sergio Casal / (Spain) Emilio Sánchez (second round)

== Draw ==
=== Key ===
- Q = Qualifier
- WC = Wild card
- LL = Lucky loser
- Alt = Alternate
- SE = Special exempt
- PR = Protected ranking
- ITF = ITF entry
- JE = Junior exempt
- w/o = Walkover
- r = Retired
- d = Defaulted
- SR = Special ranking

=== Finals ===
Semifinals
9	(United States) Jim Grabb (United States) Patrick McEnroe	6	6
3	(Canada) Grant Connell (United States) Patrick Galbraith	2	4
4	(Zimbabwe) Byron Black (United States) Jonathan Stark	3	2
2	(Australia) Todd Woodbridge (Australia) Mark Woodforde	6	6

Final
9	(United States) Jim Grabb (United States) Patrick McEnroe	3	6
2	(Australia) Todd Woodbridge (Australia) Mark Woodforde	6	7

=== Top half ===
==== Section 1 ====
First round
(United States) D Flach (Venezuela) M Ruah	3	6	6
(United States) S Davis (United States) B MacPhie	6	4	7
(United States) L Jensen (United States) M Jensen	2	4
(United States) R Leach (United States) S Melville	6	6
(United States) J Pugh (United States) G Van Emburgh	6	6
(United States) F Montana (United States) B Shelton	2	3
(United States) K Jones (United States) D Pate	7	6
(United States) K Kinnear (United States) D Wheaton	6	4

Second round
1	(Netherlands) J Eltingh (Netherlands) P Haarhuis	6	6	6
(United States) S Davis (United States) B MacPhie	3	7	2
(United States) R Leach (United States) S Melville	6	7
16	(Spain) S Casal (Spain) E Sánchez	4	5
9	(United States) J Grabb (United States) P McEnroe	7	7
(United States) J Pugh (United States) G Van Emburgh	6	5
(United States) K Jones (United States) D Pate	5	4
7	(South Africa) D Adams (Russia) A Olhovskiy	7	6

Third round
1	(Netherlands) J Eltingh (Netherlands) P Haarhuis	6	2	6
(United States) R Leach (United States) S Melville	4	6	3
9	(United States) J Grabb (United States) P McEnroe	6	6
7	(South Africa) D Adams (Russia) A Olhovskiy	4	2

Quarterfinals
1	(Netherlands) J Eltingh (Netherlands) P Haarhuis	3	6
9	(United States) J Grabb (United States) P McEnroe	6	7

==== Section 2 ====
First round
WC	(United States) S Humphries (Australia) M Philippoussis	2	7	6
(South Africa) M Ondruska (South Africa) G Stafford	6	6	7
(Australia) A Florent (Australia) P Kilderry	2	4
(United States) T Kronemann (Australia) D Macpherson	6	6
WC	(United States) J Courier (United States) T Martin	7	6
(United Kingdom) M Petchey (Sweden) M Tillström	6	2
(France) A Boetsch (France) O Delaître	2	6	6
(Czech Republic) P Korda (Spain) J Sánchez	6	4	7

Second round
3	(Canada) G Connell (United States) P Galbraith	3	6	6
(South Africa) M Ondruska (South Africa) G Stafford	6	4	1
(United States) T Kronemann (Australia) D Macpherson	5	6	3
14	(United States) T Ho (New Zealand) B Steven	7	4	6
12	(United States) A O'Brien (Australia) S Stolle	6	6	6
WC	(United States) J Courier (United States) T Martin	4	7	3
(Czech Republic) P Korda (Spain) J Sánchez	7	7
5	(Sweden) J Apell (Sweden) J Björkman	6	6

Third round
3	(Canada) G Connell (United States) P Galbraith	6	6
14	(United States) T Ho (New Zealand) B Steven	4	1
12	(United States) A O'Brien (Australia) S Stolle	6	5	3
(Czech Republic) P Korda (Spain) J Sánchez	3	7	6

Quarterfinals
3	(Canada) G Connell (United States) P Galbraith	w/o
(Czech Republic) P Korda (Spain) J Sánchez

=== Bottom half ===
==== Section 3 ====
First round
(Canada) A Chang (Sweden) T Nydahl	4	3
(Netherlands) T Nijssen (Netherlands) M Oosting	6	6
(South Africa) C van Rensburg (South Africa) D Visser	6	2^{d}
(United States) D Randall (United States) K Thorne	7	3
(Czech Republic) D Rikl (Netherlands) J Siemerink	6	6
(South Africa) S Kruger (Australia) M Tebbutt	3	4
(France) J-P Fleurian (Netherlands) S Noteboom	7	7
(Czech Republic) K Nováček (Sweden) M Wilander	6	6

Second round
6	(United States) J Palmer (United States) R Reneberg	6	6
(Netherlands) T Nijssen (Netherlands) M Oosting	3	2
(United States) D Randall (United States) K Thorne	6	7
11	(Czech Republic) C Suk (Czech Republic) D Vacek	2	6
13	(South Africa) G Muller (South Africa) P Norval	3	4
(Czech Republic) D Rikl (Netherlands) J Siemerink	6	6
(France) J-P Fleurian (Netherlands) S Noteboom	3	6
4	(Zimbabwe) B Black (United States) J Stark	6	7

Third round
6	(United States) J Palmer (United States) R Reneberg	6	6
(United States) D Randall (United States) K Thorne	1	2
(Czech Republic) D Rikl (Netherlands) J Siemerink	6	1
4	(Zimbabwe) B Black (United States) J Stark	7	6

Quarterfinals
6	(United States) J Palmer (United States) R Reneberg	3	6	2
4	(Zimbabwe) B Black (United States) J Stark	6	1	6

==== Section 4 ====
First round
(United States) M Bauer (Italy) D Nargiso	6	4
(Argentina) D Orsanic (Sweden) L-A Wahlgren	7	6
(India) L Paes (Zimbabwe) K Ullyett	6	6
(Sweden) S Edberg (Sweden) H Holm	7	7
Q	(Australia) G Doyle (Italy) G Pozzi	6	4	7
(United States) S Cannon (South Africa) B Talbot	1	6	6
(United Kingdom) N Broad (South Africa) B Haygarth	6	6
Q	(South Africa) N Godwin (South Africa) M Kaplan	2	1

Second round
8	(The Bahamas) M Knowles (Canada) D Nestor	7	6
(Argentina) D Orsanic (Sweden) L-A Wahlgren	6	1
(Sweden) S Edberg (Sweden) H Holm	6	6
10	(Sweden) N Kulti (Sweden) M Larsson	3	2
15	(South Africa) L Bale (South Africa) J-L de Jager	6	3	7
Q	(Australia) G Doyle (Italy) G Pozzi	4	6	6
(United Kingdom) N Broad (South Africa) B Haygarth	1	6
2	(Australia) T Woodbridge (Australia) M Woodforde	6	7

Third round
8	(The Bahamas) M Knowles (Canada) D Nestor	7	3	7
(Sweden) S Edberg (Sweden) H Holm	5	6	6
15	(South Africa) L Bale (South Africa) J-L de Jager	5	2
2	(Australia) T Woodbridge (Australia) M Woodforde	7	6

Quarterfinals
8	(The Bahamas) M Knowles (Canada) D Nestor	6	3
2	(Australia) T Woodbridge (Australia) M Woodforde	7	6
