= 1997 International Tennis Championships – Singles =

Singles
- 1997 International Tennis Championships

Final
- Champion: (Australia) Jason Stoltenberg
- Runner-up: (Sweden) Jonas Björkman
- Score: 6–0, 2–6, 7–5

Details
- Draw: 32
- Seeds: 8

Events
Singles	Doubles
- Delray Beach Open

Jason Stoltenberg defeated Jonas Björkman 6–0, 2–6, 7–5 to win the 1997 International Tennis Championships singles event. Stoltenberg was the defending champion.

== Seeds ==
1. (Sweden) Jonas Björkman (final)
2. (Czech Republic) Petr Korda (second round, retired)
3. (United States) Alex O'Brien (first round)
4. (Australia) Jason Stoltenberg (champion)
5. (Zimbabwe) Byron Black (second round)
6. (Sweden) Nicklas Kulti (first round)
7. (Australia) Sandon Stolle (second round)
8. (Austria) Gilbert Schaller (first round)

== Draw ==
Key

- Q = Qualifier
- WC = Wild card
- LL = Lucky loser
- Alt = Alternate
- ITF = ITF entry
- PR = Protected ranking
- SR = Special ranking
- SE = Special exempt
- JE = Junior exempt
- JR = Junior Accelerator Programme entrant
- CO = College Accelerator Programme entrant
- NG = Next Gen Accelerator Program entrant
- w/o = Walkover
- r = Retired
- d = Defaulted

=== Finals ===
Semifinals
1	(Sweden) Jonas Björkman	6	4	6
Q	(United States) Steve Campbell	4	6	4
4	(Australia) Jason Stoltenberg	6	6
(Belgium) Johan van Herck	3	3

Final
1	(Sweden) Jonas Björkman	0	6	5
4	(Australia) Jason Stoltenberg	6	2	7

=== Top half ===
First round
1	(Sweden) J Björkman	6	6
(Argentina) M Zabaleta	3	2
(France) S Simian	7^{7}	6^{4}	3
WC	(United States) L Jensen	6^{5}	7^{7}	6
WC	(United States) I Baron	0	2
(Sweden) P Fredriksson	6	6
(Spain) J A Viloca	7^{7}	6
8	(Austria) G Schaller	6^{3}	2
3	(United States) A O'Brien	6	3	3
(Armenia) S Sargsian	3	6	6
LL	(Venezuela) N Pereira	3	4
(United States) D Flach	6	6
(United States) V Spadea	4	6^{4}
Q	(United States) S Campbell	6	7^{7}
(South Africa) M Ondruska	3	2
5	(Zimbabwe) B Black	6	6

Second round
1	(Sweden) J Björkman	6	6
WC	(United States) L Jensen	1	2
(Sweden) P Fredriksson	4	3
(Spain) J A Viloca	6	6
(Armenia) S Sargsian	7^{7}	6
(United States) D Flach	6^{5}	4
Q	(United States) S Campbell	3	6	6
5	(Zimbabwe) B Black	6	4	3

Quarterfinals
1	(Sweden) J Björkman	6	7^{7}
(Spain) J A Viloca	4	6^{2}
(Armenia) S Sargsian	1	3
Q	(United States) S Campbell	6	6

Semifinals
1	(Sweden) J Björkman	6	4	6
Q	(United States) S Campbell	4	6	4

=== Bottom half ===
First round
6	(Sweden) N Kulti	3	6	1
Q	(France) F Fontang	6	4	6
Q	(United States) D Witt	6	6
(Denmark) K Carlsen	4	2
(France) G Raoux	3	6	4
(Sweden) M Norman	6	3	6
WC	(Spain) E Sánchez	2	4
4	(Australia) J Stoltenberg	6	6
7	(Australia) S Stolle	6	6
(Canada) S Lareau	1	4
Q	(Paraguay) R Delgado	6^{5}	3
(Belgium) J van Herck	7^{7}	6
(Netherlands) D van Scheppingen	3	7^{7}	1
(Australia) M Woodforde	6	6^{3}	6
(South Africa) N Godwin	3	4
2	(Czech Republic) P Korda	6	6

Second round
Q	(France) F Fontang	6	3^{r}
Q	(United States) D Witt	4	2
(Sweden) M Norman	0	6	4
4	(Australia) J Stoltenberg	6	3	6
7	(Australia) S Stolle	3	6	3
(Belgium) J van Herck	6	4	6
(Australia) M Woodforde	1	6
2	(Czech Republic) P Korda	6	4	r

Quarterfinals
Q	(United States) D Witt	1	5
4	(Australia) J Stoltenberg	6	7
(Belgium) J van Herck	3	6	6
(Australia) M Woodforde	6	3	2

Semifinals
4	(Australia) J Stoltenberg	6	6
(Belgium) J van Herck	3	3
