= 1997 International Tennis Championships – Doubles =

Sports championship

Doubles
- 1997 International Tennis Championships

Final
- Champions: (United States) Dave Randall (United States) Greg Van Emburgh
- Runners-up: (United States) Luke Jensen (United States) Murphy Jensen
- Score: 6–7^{(2–7)}, 6–2, 7–6^{(7–2)}

Events
Singles	Doubles
- Delray Beach Open

Todd Woodbridge and Mark Woodforde were the defending champions, but did not participate this year.

Dave Randall and Greg Van Emburgh won in the final 6–7^{(2–7)}, 6–2, 7–6^{(7–2)}, against Luke Jensen and Murphy Jensen.

== Seeds ==
1. (Australia) Sandon Stolle / (Czech Republic) Cyril Suk (first round)
2. (Netherlands) Tom Kempers / (Netherlands) Tom Nijssen (first round)
3. (United States) Luke Jensen / (United States) Murphy Jensen (final)
4. (Canada) Sébastien Lareau / (Canada) Sébastien Leblanc (quarterfinals)

== Draw ==
Key

- Q = Qualifier
- WC = Wild card
- LL = Lucky loser
- Alt = Alternate
- ITF = ITF entry
- PR = Protected ranking
- SR = Special ranking
- SE = Special exempt
- JE = Junior exempt
- JR = Junior Accelerator Programme entrant
- CO = College Accelerator Programme entrant
- NG = Next Gen Accelerator Program entrant
- w/o = Walkover
- r = Retired
- d = Defaulted

=== Draw ===
First round
1	(Australia) S Stolle (Czech Republic) C Suk	3	4
(France) G Raoux (France) S Simian	6	6
(South Africa) B Haygarth (United States) T.J. Middleton	6^{7}	3
WC	(The Bahamas) M Merklein (United States) V Spadea	7^{9}	6
3	(United States) L Jensen (United States) M Jensen	4	6	6
(Spain) J Alonso (Spain) E Sánchez	6	3	0
(Venezuela) N Pereira (United States) J Salzenstein	7	3	7^{7}
(United States) K Kinnear (United States) D Flach	5	6	6^{1}
Q	(United States) C Clark (United States) T Phillips	6^{4}	6	3
(United States) D Randall (United States) G Van Emburgh	7^{7}	4	6
WC	(United States) S Campbell (United States) D Witt	6	3	4
4	(Canada) S Lareau (Canada) S Leblanc	2	6	6
LL	(Armenia) S Sargsian (United States) M Sell	4	4
WC	(United States) I Baron (United States) T Ho	6	6
(Sweden) P Fredriksson (Hungary) G Köves	6	7^{7}
2	(Netherlands) T Kempers (Netherlands) T Nijssen	3	6^{2}

Quarterfinals
(France) G Raoux (France) S Simian	7^{7}	6
WC	(The Bahamas) M Merklein (United States) V Spadea	6^{2}	4
3	(United States) L Jensen (United States) M Jensen	2	6	6
(Venezuela) N Pereira (United States) J Salzenstein	6	3	3
(United States) D Randall (United States) G Van Emburgh	7^{7}	7
4	(Canada) S Lareau (Canada) S Leblanc	6^{3}	5
WC	(United States) I Baron (United States) T Ho	6	2	6
(Sweden) P Fredriksson (Hungary) G Köves	2	6	1

Semifinals
(France) G Raoux (France) S Simian	2	1
3	(United States) L Jensen (United States) M Jensen	6	6
(United States) D Randall (United States) G Van Emburgh	6	7^{7}
WC	(United States) I Baron (United States) T Ho	2	6^{3}

Final
3	(United States) L Jensen (United States) M Jensen	7^{7}	2	6^{2}
(United States) D Randall (United States) G Van Emburgh	6^{2}	6	7^{7}
