= 1999 Citrix Tennis Championships – Doubles =

Doubles
- 1999 Citrix Tennis Championships

Final
- Champions: (Belarus) Max Mirnyi (Serbia and Montenegro) Nenad Zimonjić
- Runners-up: (United States) Doug Flach (United States) Brian MacPhie
- Score: 7–6, 3–6, 6–3

Events
Singles	Doubles
- Delray Beach Open

Grant Stafford and Kevin Ullyett were the defending champions, but did not participate this year.

Max Mirnyi and Nenad Zimonjić won in the final 7–6, 3–6, 6–3, against Doug Flach and Brian MacPhie.

== Seeds ==
1. (United States) Patrick Galbraith / (United States) Justin Gimelstob (quarterfinals)
2. (Sweden) Nicklas Kulti / (Sweden) Mikael Tillström (quarterfinals)
3. (Canada) Sébastien Lareau / (Mexico) David Roditi (first round)
4. (United States) Brandon Coupe / (The Bahamas) Mark Merklein (quarterfinals)

== Draw ==
Key

- Q = Qualifier
- WC = Wild card
- LL = Lucky loser
- Alt = Alternate
- ITF = ITF entry
- PR = Protected ranking
- SR = Special ranking
- SE = Special exempt
- JE = Junior exempt
- JR = Junior Accelerator Programme entrant
- CO = College Accelerator Programme entrant
- NG = Next Gen Accelerator Program entrant
- w/o = Walkover
- r = Retired
- d = Defaulted

=== Draw ===
First round
1	(United States) P Galbraith (United States) J Gimelstob	6	6
WC	(United States) M Jensen (United States) D Wheaton	1	3
(Spain) A Martín (South Africa) P Rosner	6	6
(South Africa) B Haygarth (South Africa) B Talbot	3	2
3	(Canada) S Lareau (Mexico) D Roditi	6	6	4
(Argentina) D del Río (Brazil) J Oncins	1	7	6
(Argentina) L Arnold (Argentina) M Hood	1	6
(Belarus) M Mirnyi (Serbia and Montenegro) N Zimonjić	6	7
(United States) B Bryan (United States) M Bryan	2	3
Q	(United States) G Grant (United States) T.J. Middleton	6	6
(Australia) M Tebbutt (United States) J Waite	2	3
4	(United States) B Coupe (The Bahamas) M Merklein	6	6
WC	(United States) I Baron (Australia) S Stolle	4	3
(United States) D Flach (United States) B MacPhie	6	6
WC	(United States) J Kriek (United States) R Seguso	4	4
2	(Sweden) N Kulti (Sweden) M Tillström	6	6

Quarterfinals
1	(United States) P Galbraith (United States) J Gimelstob	2	6	1
(Spain) A Martín (South Africa) P Rosner	6	1	6
(Argentina) D del Río (Brazil) J Oncins	3	1
(Belarus) M Mirnyi (Serbia and Montenegro) N Zimonjić	6	6
Q	(United States) G Grant (United States) T.J. Middleton	6	7
4	(United States) B Coupe (The Bahamas) M Merklein	4	5
(United States) D Flach (United States) B MacPhie	6	6	6
2	(Sweden) N Kulti (Sweden) M Tillström	7	4	2

Semifinals
(Spain) A Martín (South Africa) P Rosner	5	3
(Belarus) M Mirnyi (Serbia and Montenegro) N Zimonjić	7	6
Q	(United States) G Grant (United States) T.J. Middleton	6	4
(United States) D Flach (United States) B MacPhie	7	6

Final
(Belarus) M Mirnyi (Serbia and Montenegro) N Zimonjić	7	3	6
(United States) D Flach (United States) B MacPhie	6	6	3
