= 1994 Lipton Championships – Men's doubles =

Men's doubles
- 1994 Lipton Championships

Final
- Champion: (Netherlands) Jacco Eltingh (Netherlands) Paul Haarhuis
- Runner-up: (The Bahamas) Mark Knowles (United States) Jared Palmer
- Score: 7–6, 7–6

Events
Singles	men	women
Doubles	men	women
← 1993 ·	Lipton Championships	· 1995 →

Richard Krajicek and Jan Siemerink were the defending champions, but Krajicek did not participate this year. Siemerink partnered Daniel Vacek, losing in the semifinals.

Jacco Eltingh and Paul Haarhuis won the title, defeating Mark Knowles and Jared Palmer 7–6, 7–6 in the final.

== Seeds ==
1. (Canada) Grant Connell / (United States) Patrick Galbraith (second round)
2. (Zimbabwe) Byron Black / (United States) Jonathan Stark (semifinals)
3. (Netherlands) Jacco Eltingh / (Netherlands) Paul Haarhuis (champions)
4. (Australia) Todd Woodbridge / (Australia) Mark Woodforde (third round)
5. (Netherlands) Tom Nijssen / (Czech Republic) Cyril Suk (second round)
6. (United States) Ken Flach / (United States) Rick Leach (third round)
7. (United States) Luke Jensen / (United States) Murphy Jensen (second round)
8. (Spain) Sergio Casal / (Spain) Emilio Sánchez (second round)
9. (United States) Patrick McEnroe / (United States) Richey Reneberg (third round)
10. (Sweden) Jan Apell / (Sweden) Jonas Björkman (quarterfinals)
11. (South Africa) Gary Muller / (South Africa) Danie Visser (quarterfinals)
12. (The Bahamas) Mark Knowles / (United States) Jared Palmer (final)
13. (United States) Mike Bauer / (United States) Scott Davis (quarterfinals)
14. (United States) Brad Pearce / (United States) Dave Randall (second round)
15. (Netherlands) Jan Siemerink / (Czech Republic) Daniel Vacek (semifinals)
16. (United States) Shelby Cannon / (South Africa) Byron Talbot (third round)

== Draw ==
=== Key ===
- Q = Qualifier
- WC = Wild card
- LL = Lucky loser
- Alt = Alternate
- SE = Special exempt
- PR = Protected ranking
- ITF = ITF entry
- JE = Junior exempt
- w/o = Walkover
- r = Retired
- d = Defaulted
- SR = Special ranking

=== Finals ===
Semifinals
15	(Netherlands) Jan Siemerink (Czech Republic) Daniel Vacek	2	6	5
3	(Netherlands) Jacco Eltingh (Netherlands) Paul Haarhuis	6	3	7
12	(The Bahamas) Mark Knowles (United States) Jared Palmer	7	3	7
2	(Zimbabwe) Byron Black (United States) Jonathan Stark	5	6	5

Final
3	(Netherlands) Jacco Eltingh (Netherlands) Paul Haarhuis	7	7
12	(The Bahamas) Mark Knowles (United States) Jared Palmer	6	6

=== Top half ===
==== Section 1 ====
First round
(United States) S DeVries (Australia) D Macpherson	6	4	6
WC	(Sweden) N Kroon (Sweden) M Wilander	1	6	1
WC	(United Kingdom) G Rusedski (United States) M Washington	6	6
Q	(United States) T Mercer (United States) J Yancey	3	2
(Canada) S Lareau (Canada) D Nestor	7	6	4
(United States) B Garnett (United States) TJ Middleton	6	7	6
(United States) K Kinnear (United States) D Wheaton	1	6	7
(United States) G Van Emburgh (South Africa) C van Rensburg	6	3	5

Second round
1	(Canada) G Connell (United States) P Galbraith	4	6
(United States) S DeVries (Australia) D Macpherson	6	7
WC	(United Kingdom) G Rusedski (United States) M Washington	2	4
15	(Netherlands) J Siemerink (Czech Republic) D Vacek	6	6
10	(Sweden) J Apell (Sweden) J Björkman	6	7
(United States) B Garnett (United States) TJ Middleton	2	5
(United States) K Kinnear (United States) D Wheaton	6	6
8	(Spain) S Casal (Spain) E Sánchez	2	4

Third round
(United States) S DeVries (Australia) D Macpherson	6	3
15	(Netherlands) J Siemerink (Czech Republic) D Vacek	7	6
10	(Sweden) J Apell (Sweden) J Björkman	6	6
(United States) K Kinnear (United States) D Wheaton	1	3

Quarterfinals
15	(Netherlands) J Siemerink (Czech Republic) D Vacek	4	7	6
10	(Sweden) J Apell (Sweden) J Björkman	6	5	3

==== Section 2 ====
First round
WC	(Brazil) L Mattar (Brazil) J Oncins	4	7	3
(France) A Boetsch (France) O Delaître	6	5	6
(United States) B Devening (New Zealand) B Steven	7	1	7
Q	(United States) D Eisenman (South Africa) E Ferreira	6	6	5
(South Africa) J-L de Jager (Zimbabwe) K Ullyett	6	7
(Australia) P Rafter (United States) B Shelton	3	5
(South Africa) W Ferreira (United States) J Grabb	6	1	6
(United States) K Thorne (Australia) L Warder	2	6	2

Second round
3	(Netherlands) J Eltingh (Netherlands) P Haarhuis	6	7
(France) A Boetsch (France) O Delaître	3	6
(United States) B Devening (New Zealand) B Steven	6	4	6
14	(United States) B Pearce (United States) D Randall	2	6	3
11	(South Africa) G Muller (South Africa) D Visser	6	6
(South Africa) J-L de Jager (Zimbabwe) K Ullyett	1	4
(South Africa) W Ferreira (United States) J Grabb	6	6	1
6	(United States) K Flach (United States) R Leach	7	3	6

Third round
3	(Netherlands) J Eltingh (Netherlands) P Haarhuis	2	6	6
(United States) B Devening (New Zealand) B Steven	6	3	3
11	(South Africa) G Muller (South Africa) D Visser	4	7	7
6	(United States) K Flach (United States) R Leach	6	6	6

Quarterfinals
3	(Netherlands) J Eltingh (Netherlands) P Haarhuis	6	7
11	(South Africa) G Muller (South Africa) D Visser	3	6

=== Bottom half ===
==== Section 3 ====
First round
(Croatia) G Ivanišević (Switzerland) M Rosset	6	6	6
(Spain) J Sánchez (Australia) J Stoltenberg	4	7	4
(Argentina) P Albano (United States) J Waite	3	3
(United States) A O'Brien (Australia) S Stolle	6	6
(United States) D Johnson (India) L Paes	6	7
(South Africa) R Deppe (Czech Republic) D Rikl	2	5
WC	(United States) A Agassi (United States) R Seguso	6	4
(United States) P Annacone (United States) D Flach	7	6

Second round
5	(Netherlands) T Nijssen (Czech Republic) C Suk	6	7	4
(Croatia) G Ivanišević (Switzerland) M Rosset	7	5	6
(United States) A O'Brien (Australia) S Stolle	4	6	1
12	(The Bahamas) M Knowles (United States) J Palmer	6	1	6
13	(United States) M Bauer (United States) S Davis	6	6	6
(United States) D Johnson (India) L Paes	7	3	3
(United States) P Annacone (United States) D Flach	6	2	1
4	(Australia) T Woodbridge (Australia) M Woodforde	4	6	6

Third round
(Croatia) G Ivanišević (Switzerland) M Rosset	2^{r}
12	(The Bahamas) M Knowles (United States) J Palmer	1
13	(United States) M Bauer (United States) S Davis	3	7	6
4	(Australia) T Woodbridge (Australia) M Woodforde	6	6	2

Quarterfinals
12	(The Bahamas) M Knowles (United States) J Palmer	6	7
13	(United States) M Bauer (United States) S Davis	4	6

==== Section 4 ====
First round
(United States) M Briggs (United States) T Kronemann	4	4
(United States) F Montana (United States) J Pugh	6	6
(United States) B MacPhie (United States) S Melville	6	7
(United States) M Keil (United States) D Pate	4	6
(Germany) M-K Goellner (South Africa) M Ondruska	4	6	3
(South Africa) L Bale (Sweden) L-A Wahlgren	6	1	6
WC	(United States) I Lendl (Brazil) C Motta	7	4	4
(Ecuador) N Pereira (Venezuela) M Ruah	6	6	6

Second round
7	(United States) L Jensen (United States) M Jensen	6	3
(United States) F Montana (United States) J Pugh	7	6
(United States) B MacPhie (United States) S Melville	3	2
9	(United States) P McEnroe (United States) R Reneberg	6	6
16	(United States) S Cannon (South Africa) B Talbot	6	6
(South Africa) L Bale (Sweden) L-A Wahlgren	2	2
(Ecuador) N Pereira (Venezuela) M Ruah	4	4
2	(Zimbabwe) B Black (United States) J Stark	6	6

Third round
(United States) F Montana (United States) J Pugh	3	6	6
9	(United States) P McEnroe (United States) R Reneberg	6	3	1
16	(United States) S Cannon (South Africa) B Talbot	3	4
2	(Zimbabwe) B Black (United States) J Stark	6	6

Quarterfinals
(United States) F Montana (United States) J Pugh	3	1
2	(Zimbabwe) B Black (United States) J Stark	6	6
