= 1999 Citrix Tennis Championships – Singles =

Singles
- 1999 Citrix Tennis Championships

Final
- Champion: (Australia) Lleyton Hewitt
- Runner-up: (Belgium) Xavier Malisse
- Score: 6–4, 6–7^{(2–7)}, 6–1

Details
- Draw: 32
- Seeds: 8

Events
Singles	Doubles
← 1998 ·	Delray Beach Open	· 2000 →

Lleyton Hewitt defeated Xavier Malisse 6–4, 6–7^{(2–7)}, 6–1 to win the 1999 Citrix Tennis Championships singles event. Andrew Ilie was the champion but did not defend his title.

== Seeds ==
1. (United States) Vincent Spadea (first round)
2. (France) Sébastien Grosjean (semifinals)
3. (Australia) Scott Draper (semifinals)
4. (Sweden) Magnus Norman (second round)
5. (Sweden) Magnus Larsson (quarterfinals)
6. (Australia) Lleyton Hewitt (champion)
7. (Australia) Mark Woodforde (first round)
8. (United States) Justin Gimelstob (second round)

== Draw ==
=== Key ===
- Q = Qualifier
- WC = Wild card
- LL = Lucky loser
- Alt = Alternate
- ITF = ITF entry
- PR = Protected ranking
- SR = Special ranking
- SE = Special exempt
- JE = Junior exempt
- JR = Junior Accelerator Programme entrant
- CO = College Accelerator Programme entrant
- NG = Next Gen Accelerator Program entrant
- w/o = Walkover
- r = Retired
- d = Defaulted

=== Finals ===
Semifinals
WC	(Belgium) Xavier Malisse	6	6
3	(Australia) Scott Draper	4	4
6	(Australia) Lleyton Hewitt	6	6
2	(France) Sébastien Grosjean	3	2

Final
WC	(Belgium) Xavier Malisse	4	7^{7}	1
6	(Australia) Lleyton Hewitt	6	6^{2}	6

=== Top half ===
First round
1	(United States) V Spadea	5	6	4
(Sweden) M Tillström	7	0	6
Q	(United States) P Goldstein	6^{4}	1
WC	(Belgium) X Malisse	7^{7}	6
(Canada) S Lareau	3	2
(Argentina) H Gumy	6	6
(Czech Republic) P Korda	4	2
8	(United States) J Gimelstob	6	6
3	(Australia) S Draper	6	7
(Costa Rica) J Marín	4	5
WC	(United States) J Courier	6	2	6^{6}
Q	(Belarus) M Mirnyi	4	6	7^{8}
Q	(United States) G Grant	6	6
LL	(United States) B MacPhie	4	0
(Spain) A Martín	5	3
5	(Sweden) M Larsson	7	6

Second round
(Sweden) M Tillström	5	4
WC	(Belgium) X Malisse	7	6
(Argentina) H Gumy	7^{7}	7^{7}
8	(United States) J Gimelstob	6^{2}	6^{2}
3	(Australia) S Draper	6	6^{4}	6
Q	(Belarus) M Mirnyi	4	7^{7}	4
Q	(United States) G Grant	7^{7}	2	3
5	(Sweden) M Larsson	6^{4}	6	6

Quarterfinals
WC	(Belgium) X Malisse	7	6
(Argentina) H Gumy	5	4
3	(Australia) S Draper	4	6	6
5	(Sweden) M Larsson	6	3	3

Semifinals
WC	(Belgium) X Malisse	6	6
3	(Australia) S Draper	4	4

=== Bottom half ===
First round
6	(Australia) L Hewitt	6^{12}	6	6
(Argentina) G Cañas	7^{14}	2	4
(Austria) S Koubek	6	6
(Spain) G Blanco	4	3
(Armenia) S Sargsian	6	6
(Australia) T Woodbridge	1	1
(Argentina) L Arnold Ker	4	3
4	(Sweden) M Norman	6	6
7	(Australia) M Woodforde	6^{4}	5
(Philippines) C Mamiit	7^{7}	7
(Argentina) M Rodríguez	6^{7}	3
WC	(Australia) S Stolle	7^{9}	6
Q	(Belgium) C Rochus	6	6
(France) G Raoux	3	1
(Spain) Á Calatrava	6^{5}	7^{7}	0^{r}
2	(France) S Grosjean	7^{7}	6^{2}	3

Second round
6	(Australia) L Hewitt	2	6	6
(Austria) S Koubek	6	3	4
(Armenia) S Sargsian	6	6
4	(Sweden) M Norman	2	0
(Philippines) C Mamiit	6	6
WC	(Australia) S Stolle	4	2
Q	(Belgium) C Rochus	1	4
2	(France) S Grosjean	6	6

Quarterfinals
6	(Australia) L Hewitt	6	6
(Armenia) S Sargsian	3	1
(Philippines) C Mamiit	2	1
2	(France) S Grosjean	6	6

Semifinals
6	(Australia) L Hewitt	6	6
2	(France) S Grosjean	3	2
