= 1993 French Open =

- Date: 24 May – 6 June 1993
- Edition: 92
- Category: 63rd Grand Slam (ITF)
- Surface: Clay
- Location: Paris (XVI^{e}), France
- Venue: Stade Roland Garros

Champions

Men's singles
- (Spain) Sergi Bruguera

Women's singles
- (Germany) Steffi Graf

Men's doubles
- (United States) Luke Jensen / (United States) Murphy Jensen

Women's doubles
- (United States) Gigi Fernández / (Belarus) Natalia Zvereva

Mixed doubles
- (Russia) Eugenia Maniokova / (Russia) Andrei Olhovskiy
- French Open

The 1993 French Open was a tennis tournament that took place on the outdoor clay courts at the Stade Roland Garros in Paris, France. The tournament was held from 24 May until 6 June. It was the 92nd staging of the French Open, and the second Grand Slam tennis event of 1993.

== Seniors ==
=== Men's singles ===
(Spain) Sergi Bruguera defeated (United States) Jim Courier, 6–4, 2–6, 6–2, 3–6, 6–3

- It was Bruguera's 2nd title of the year, and his 8th overall. It was his 1st career Grand Slam title. Bruguera notably defeated the top two seeds (Pete Sampras and Courier) on his way to the title—the last male player to do so in any Grand Slam event until Stanislas Wawrinka did so at the 2014 Australian Open.

=== Women's singles ===
(Germany) Steffi Graf defeated (United States) Mary Joe Fernández, 4–6, 6–2, 6–4

- It was Graf's 4th title of the year, and her 73rd overall. It was her 12th career Grand Slam title, and her 3rd French Open title.

=== Men's doubles ===
(United States) Luke Jensen / (United States) Murphy Jensen defeated (Germany) Marc-Kevin Goellner / (Germany) David Prinosil, 6–4, 6–7, 6–4

=== Women's doubles ===
(United States) Gigi Fernández / (Belarus) Natalia Zvereva defeated (Latvia) Larisa Savchenko Neiland / (Czech Republic) Jana Novotná, 6–3, 7–5

=== Mixed doubles ===
(Russia) Eugenia Maniokova / (Russia) Andrei Olhovskiy defeated (South Africa) Elna Reinach / (South Africa) Danie Visser, 6–2, 4–6, 6–4

== Juniors ==
=== Boys' singles ===
(Spain) Roberto Carretero defeated (Spain) Albert Costa, 6–0, 7–6

=== Girls' singles ===
(Switzerland) Martina Hingis defeated (Belgium) Laurence Courtois, 7–5, 7–5

=== Boys' doubles ===
(New Zealand) Steven Downs / (New Zealand) James Greenhalgh defeated (South Africa) Neville Godwin / (South Africa) Gareth Williams, 6–1, 6–1

=== Girls' doubles ===
(Belgium) Laurence Courtois / (Belgium) Nancy Feber defeated (Netherlands) Lara Bitter / (Netherlands) Maaike Koutstaal, 3–6, 6–1, 6–3

== Prize money ==
Event		W	F	SF	QF	4R	3R	2R	1R
Singles	Men	FF2,920,000	FF1,460,000	FF730,000	FF385,000	FF206,200	FF119,000	FF73,000	FF43,600
Singles	Women	FF2,700,000	FF1,350,000	FF675,000	FF340,000	FF176,000	FF98,000	FF57,750	FF36,500

Total prize money for the event was FF45,164,000.

Preceded by 1993 Australian Open	Grand Slams	Succeeded by 1993 Wimbledon Championships
