= 1998 International Tennis Championships =

- Date: May 4–11
- Edition: 6th
- Category: World Series
- Draw: 32S / 16D
- Prize money: $245,000
- Surface: Clay / outdoor
- Location: Coral Springs, Florida, U.S.

Champions

Singles
- (Australia) Andrew Ilie

Doubles
- (South Africa) Grant Stafford / (Zimbabwe) Kevin Ullyett
← 1997 ·	Delray Beach Open	· 1999 →

The 1998 International Tennis Championships, also known as America's Red Clay Championships, was a men's tennis tournament held in Coral Springs, Florida, United States. The event was part of the World Series category of the 1998 ATP Tour. The tournament was played on outdoor clay courts and was held from May 4 through May 11, 1998. Qualifier Andrew Ilie won the singles title.

== Finals ==
=== Singles ===
(Australia) Andrew Ilie defeated (Italy) Davide Sanguinetti, 7–5, 6–4

- It was Ilie's only title of the year and the 1st of his career.

=== Doubles ===
(South Africa) Grant Stafford / (Zimbabwe) Kevin Ullyett defeated (The Bahamas) Mark Merklein / (United States) Vincent Spadea, 7–5, 6–4

- It was Stafford's 2nd title of the year and the 3rd of his career. It was Ullyett's 3rd title of the year and the 4th of his career.
