= 1993 French Open – Mixed doubles =

Mixed doubles
- 1993 French Open

Final
- Champion: (Russia) Andrei Olhovskiy; (Russia) Eugenia Maniokova
- Runner-up: (South Africa) Danie Visser; (South Africa) Elna Reinach
- Score: 6–2, 4–6, 6–4

Details
- Draw: 48
- Seeds: 16

Events
Singles	men	women		boys	girls
Doubles	men	women	mixed	boys	girls
WC Singles	men	women	quad
WC Doubles	men	women	quad
Legends	−45	45+	women
- French Open

The mixed doubles tournament at the 1993 French Open was held from 24 May until 6 June 1993 on the outdoor clay courts at the Stade Roland Garros in Paris, France. Andrei Olhovskiy and Eugenia Maniokova won the title, defeating Danie Visser and Elna Reinach in the final.

== Seeds ==
1. (Australia) Todd Woodbridge / (United States) Gigi Fernández (quarterfinals)
2. (Australia) Mark Kratzmann / (Belarus) Natasha Zvereva (quarterfinals)
3. (Netherlands) Paul Haarhuis / (Canada) Jill Hetherington (quarterfinals)
4. (United States) Rick Leach / (United States) Zina Garrison-Jackson (second round)
5. (Czech Republic) Cyril Suk / (Latvia) Larisa Savchenko (second round)
6. (Australia) John Fitzgerald / (Australia) Elizabeth Smylie (semifinals)
7. (United States) Steve DeVries / (United States) Patty Fendick (second round)
8. (Canada) Grant Connell / (United States) Kathy Rinaldi (second round)
9. (South Africa) Danie Visser / (South Africa) Elna Reinach (final)
10. (United States) Mark Keil / (United States) Pam Shriver (third round)
11. (Russia) Andrei Olhovskiy / (Russia) Eugenia Maniokova (champions)
12. (Netherlands) Tom Nijssen / (Netherlands) Manon Bollegraf (third round)
13. (South Africa) Marcos Ondruska / (South Africa) Amanda Coetzer (second round)
14. (Australia) Sandon Stolle / (Australia) Rennae Stubbs (third round)
15. (South Africa) David Adams / (South Africa) Rosalyn Nideffer (second round)
16. (United States) Scott Melville / (United States) Sandy Collins (second round)

== Draw ==
Key

- Q = Qualifier
- WC = Wild card
- LL = Lucky loser
- Alt = Alternate
- ITF = ITF entry
- PR = Protected ranking
- SR = Special ranking
- SE = Special exempt
- JE = Junior exempt
- JR = Junior Accelerator Programme entrant
- CO = College Accelerator Programme entrant
- NG = Next Gen Accelerator Program entrant
- w/o = Walkover
- r = Retired
- d = Defaulted

=== Finals ===
Quarterfinals

Semifinals

Final

1
- (Australia) Todd Woodbridge
- (United States) Gigi Fernández
3
2

(United States) Murphy Jensen
(Netherlands) Brenda Schultz
6
6

- (United States) Murphy Jensen
- (Netherlands) Brenda Schultz
6^{1}
6^{2}

11
(Russia) Andrei Olhovskiy
(Russia) Eugenia Maniokova
7
7

3
- (Netherlands) Paul Haarhuis
- (Canada) Jill Hetherington
4
6
1

11
(Russia) Andrei Olhovskiy
(Russia) Eugenia Maniokova
6
3
6

11
(Russia) Andrei Olhovskiy
(Russia) Eugenia Maniokova
6
4
6

9
- (South Africa) Danie Visser
- (South Africa) Elna Reinach
2
6
4

6
(Australia) John Fitzgerald
(Australia) Elizabeth Smylie
6
6

- (United States) Greg Van Emburgh
- (United States) Debbie Graham
2
4

6
- (Australia) John Fitzgerald
- (Australia) Elizabeth Smylie
4
6
2

9
(South Africa) Danie Visser
(South Africa) Elna Reinach
6
3
6

9
(South Africa) Danie Visser
(South Africa) Elna Reinach
6
6

2
- (Australia) Mark Kratzmann
- (Belarus) Natasha Zvereva
4
4

=== Top half ===
==== Section 1 ====
First round

Second round

Third round

Quarterfinals

1
(Australia) T Woodbridge
(United States) G Fernández
6
6

(South Africa) P Norval
(Argentina) I Gorrochategui
6
6

- (South Africa) P Norval
- (Argentina) I Gorrochategui
4
1

- (South Africa) JL de Jager
- (New Zealand) J Richardson
2
2

1
(Australia) T Woodbridge
(United States) G Fernández
6
6

- (United States) K Flach
- (Japan) M Kidowaki
4
6
1

- (Netherlands) HJ Davids
- (Australia) JA Faull
3
4

(Netherlands) HJ Davids
(Australia) JA Faull
6
3
6

(Netherlands) HJ Davids
(Australia) JA Faull
6
6

16
- (United States) S Melville
- (United States) S Collins
3
4

1
- (Australia) T Woodbridge
- (United States) G Fernández
3
2

(United States) M Jensen
(Netherlands) B Schultz
6
6

10
(United States) M Keil
(United States) P Shriver
6
6

(South Africa) R Deppe
(Ukraine) N Medvedeva
4
6
7

- (South Africa) R Deppe
- (Ukraine) N Medvedeva
3
4

- (United States) K Kinnear
- (Japan) N Miyagi
6
3
5

10
- (United States) M Keil
- (United States) P Shriver
5
3

- (United States) T Witsken
- (United States) K Adams
5
6
4

(United States) M Jensen
(Netherlands) B Schultz
7
6

(United States) M Jensen
(Netherlands) B Schultz
7
2
6

(United States) M Jensen
(Netherlands) B Schultz
6
6

7
- (United States) S DeVries
- (United States) P Fendick
4
2

==== Section 2 ====
First round

Second round

Third round

Quarterfinals

3
(Netherlands) P Haarhuis
(Canada) J Hetherington
3
6
6

- (Sweden) R Bergh
- (France) C Suire
3
4

- (United States) M Bauer
- (United States) K Po
6
3
4

(United States) M Bauer
(United States) K Po
6
6

3
(Netherlands) P Haarhuis
(Canada) J Hetherington
7
6

(Australia) L Warder
(Australia) M Jaggard-Lai
6
6

14
- (Australia) S Stolle
- (Australia) R Stubbs
6^{2}
4

- (United States) P Galbraith
- (United States) J Emmons
4
4

- (Australia) L Warder
- (Australia) M Jaggard-Lai
4
2

14
(Australia) S Stolle
(Australia) R Stubbs
6
6

3
- (Netherlands) P Haarhuis
- (Canada) J Hetherington
4
6
1

11
(Russia) A Olhovskiy
(Russia) E Maniokova
6
3
6

11
(Russia) A Olhovskiy
(Russia) E Maniokova
7
6

(United States) P McEnroe
(United States) M McGrath
6
6

- (United States) P McEnroe
- (United States) M McGrath
5
4

- (United States) T Kronemann
- (United States) G Helgeson
3
4

11
(Russia) A Olhovskiy
(Russia) E Maniokova
6
6

(United States) M Briggs
(United States) A Grossman
6
6

- (United States) M Briggs
- (United States) A Grossman
3
4

- (United States) L Jensen
- (Hungary) A Temesvári
4
4

(United States) M Briggs
(United States) A Grossman
3
6
7

5
- (Czech Republic) C Suk
- (Latvia) L Savchenko
6
3
5

=== Bottom half ===
==== Section 3 ====
First round

Second round

Third round

Quarterfinals

6
(Australia) J Fitzgerald
(Australia) E Smylie
7
6

- (Netherlands) J Eltingh
- (Netherlands) M Oremans
1
7
5

- (United States) B Shelton
- (United States) L McNeil
5
2

(United States) B Shelton
(United States) L McNeil
6
6^{3}
7

6
(Australia) J Fitzgerald
(Australia) E Smylie
7
2
7

Alt
- (United States) TJ Middleton
- (United States) A Henricksson
5
6
3

12
- (Netherlands) T Nijssen
- (Netherlands) M Bollegraf
5
6
5

(Argentina) P Albano
(Argentina) I Gorrochategui
7
3
6

- (Argentina) P Albano
- (Argentina) I Gorrochategui
4
6
1

12
(Netherlands) T Nijssen
(Netherlands) M Bollegraf
6
3
6

6
(Australia) J Fitzgerald
(Australia) E Smylie
6
6

- (United States) G Van Emburgh
- (United States) D Graham
2
4

13
- (South Africa) M Ondruska
- (South Africa) A Coetzer
5
2

(United States) G Van Emburgh
(United States) D Graham
7
2
1

(United States) G Van Emburgh
(United States) D Graham
7
6

WC
- (France) F Santoro
- (France) M Pierce
5
6
0^{r}

(United States) G Van Emburgh
(United States) D Graham
6
6

(Australia) J Stoltenberg
(Czech Republic) A Strnadová
6
6

3
- (Australia) J Stoltenberg
- (Czech Republic) A Strnadová
3
4

WC
- (France) S Simian
- (France) N Housset Gilbert
2
3

(Australia) J Stoltenberg
(Czech Republic) A Strnadová
6
6

4
- (United States) R Leach
- (United States) Z Garrison-Jackson
3
4

==== Section 4 ====
First round

Second round

Third round

Quarterfinals

8
- (Canada) G Connell
- (United States) K Rinaldi
6
3
5

(Netherlands) M Oosting
(Netherlands) C Vis
6
6

(Netherlands) M Oosting
(Netherlands) C Vis
0
6
7

- (United States) S Cannon
- (United States) S Stafford
2
3

- (Netherlands) M Oosting
- (Netherlands) C Vis
6^{8}
4

WC
- (France) É Winogradsky
- (France) N van Lottum
6
2
7

9
(South Africa) D Visser
(South Africa) E Reinach
7
6

(United States) B Pearce
(Georgia (country)) L Meskhi
2
6
9

- (United States) B Pearce
- (Georgia (country)) L Meskhi
6
3
1

9
(South Africa) D Visser
(South Africa) E Reinach
2
6
6

9
(South Africa) D Visser
(South Africa) E Reinach
6
6

2
- (Australia) M Kratzmann
- (Belarus) N Zvereva
4
4

15
- (South Africa) D Adams
- (South Africa) R Nideffer
3
2

(Australia) D Macpherson
(Australia) R McQuillan
6
6

(Australia) D Macpherson
(Australia) R McQuillan
6
6

- (South Africa) B Talbot
- (France) I Demongeot
1
3

- (Australia) D Macpherson
- (Australia) R McQuillan
5
4

- (United States) B Garnett
- (Australia) K Radford
4
2

2
(Australia) M Kratzmann
(Belarus) N Zvereva
7
6

WC
(Iran) M Bahrami
(France) K Quentrec
6
6

WC
- (Iran) M Bahrami
- (France) K Quentrec
0
1

2
(Australia) M Kratzmann
(Belarus) N Zvereva
6
6
