= 1997 International Tennis Championships =

- Date: May 5–12
- Edition: 5th
- Category: World Series
- Draw: 32S / 16D
- Prize money: $245,000
- Location: Coral Springs, FL, United States

Champions

Singles
- (Australia) Jason Stoltenberg

Doubles
- (United States) Dave Randall / (United States) Greg Van Emburgh
← 1996 ·	Delray Beach Open	· 1998 →

The 1997 International Tennis Championships was an ATP men's tennis tournament held in Coral Springs, Florida, United States that was part of the World Series of the 1997 ATP Tour. It was the fifth edition of the tournament and was held from May 5 to May 12, 1997. Fourth-seeded Jason Stoltenberg won his second consecutive singles title at the event.

== Finals ==
=== Singles ===
(Australia) Jason Stoltenberg defeated (Sweden) Jonas Björkman 6–0, 2–6, 7–5

- It was Stoltenberg's only singles title of the year and the 4th and last of his career.

=== Doubles ===
(United States) Dave Randall / (United States) 'Greg Van Emburgh defeated (United States) Luke Jensen / (United States) Murphy Jensen 6–7, 6–2, 7–6

- It was Randall's only title of the year and the 3rd of his career. It was van Emburgh's only title of the year and the 6th of his career.
