= 1999 Citrix Tennis Championships =

- Date: May 3–10
- Edition: 7th
- Category: ATP World Series
- Draw: 32S / 16D
- Prize money: $245,000
- Surface: Clay / outdoor
- Location: Delray Beach, Florida, U.S.

Champions

Singles
- (Australia) Lleyton Hewitt

Doubles
- (Belarus) Max Mirnyi / (Serbia and Montenegro) Nenad Zimonjić
← 1998 ·	Delray Beach Open	· 2000 →

The 1999 Citrix Tennis Championships was an ATP men's tennis tournament held in Delray Beach, Florida, United States that was part of the World Series of the 1999 ATP Tour. It was the seventh edition of the tournament and was held from May 3 to May 10, 1999. Sixth-seeded Lleyton Hewitt won the singles title.

== Finals ==
=== Singles ===
(Australia) Lleyton Hewitt defeated (Belgium) Xavier Malisse 6–4, 6–7^{(2–7)}, 6–1

- It was Hewitt's only singles title of the year and the 2nd of his career.

=== Doubles ===
(Belarus) Max Mirnyi / (Serbia and Montenegro) Nenad Zimonjić defeated (United States) Doug Flach / (United States) Brian MacPhie 7–6^{(7–3)}, 3–6, 6–3

- It was Mirnyi's 4th title of the year and the 5th of his career. It was Zimonjić's only title of the year and the 1st of his career.
