= 1993 French Open – Men's doubles =

Tennis tournament

Men's doubles
- 1993 French Open

Final
- Champion: (United States) Luke Jensen (United States) Murphy Jensen
- Runner-up: (Germany) Marc-Kevin Goellner (Germany) David Prinosil
- Score: 6–4, 6–7^{(4–7)}, 6–4

Details
- Draw: 64
- Seeds: 16

Events
Singles	men	women		boys	girls
Doubles	men	women	mixed	boys	girls
WC Singles	men	women	quad
WC Doubles	men	women	quad
Legends	−45	45+	women
- French Open

The men's doubles tournament at the 1993 French Open was held from 24 May until 6 June 1993 on the outdoor clay courts at the Stade Roland Garros in Paris, France. Luke Jensen and Murphy Jensen won the title, defeating Marc-Kevin Goellner and David Prinosil in the final.

== Seeds ==
1. (Australia) Todd Woodbridge / (Australia) Mark Woodforde (semifinals)
2. (Australia) John Fitzgerald / (Sweden) Anders Järryd (third round)
3. (Australia) Mark Kratzmann / (Australia) Wally Masur (quarterfinals)
4. (Netherlands) Jacco Eltingh / (Netherlands) Paul Haarhuis (third round)
5. (United States) Patrick McEnroe / (United States) Jonathan Stark (first round)
6. (Canada) Grant Connell / (United States) Patrick Galbraith (first round)
7. (South Africa) Danie Visser / (Australia) Laurie Warder (first round)
8. (South Africa) David Adams / (Russia) Andrei Olhovskiy (second round)
9. (United States) Steve DeVries / (Australia) David Macpherson (first round)
10. (Switzerland) Jakob Hlasek / (Switzerland) Marc Rosset (first round)
11. (United States) Ken Flach / (United States) Rick Leach (second round)
12. (Spain) Sergio Casal / (Spain) Emilio Sánchez (quarterfinals)
13. (Netherlands) Tom Nijssen / (Czech Republic) Cyril Suk (second round)
14. (United States) Shelby Cannon / (United States) Scott Melville (first round)
15. (United States) Richey Reneberg / (United States) David Wheaton (first round)
16. (Canada) Glenn Michibata / (United States) David Pate (third round)

== Draw ==
Key

- Q = Qualifier
- WC = Wild card
- LL = Lucky loser
- Alt = Alternate
- ITF = ITF entry
- PR = Protected ranking
- SR = Special ranking
- SE = Special exempt
- JE = Junior exempt
- JR = Junior Accelerator Programme entrant
- CO = College Accelerator Programme entrant
- NG = Next Gen Accelerator Program entrant
- w/o = Walkover
- r = Retired
- d = Defaulted

=== Finals ===
Quarterfinals
1	(Australia) Todd Woodbridge (Australia) Mark Woodforde	6	6
(Netherlands) Hendrik Jan Davids (South Africa) Piet Norval	2	2
3	(Australia) Mark Kratzmann (Australia) Wally Masur	4	4
(Germany) Marc-Kevin Goellner (Germany) David Prinosil	6	6
12	(Spain) Sergio Casal (Spain) Emilio Sánchez	5	1
(Sweden) Stefan Edberg (Czech Republic) Petr Korda	7	6
(United States) Luke Jensen (United States) Murphy Jensen	6	7	6
(Croatia) Goran Ivanišević (France) Henri Leconte	7	6	3

Semifinals
1	(Australia) Todd Woodbridge (Australia) Mark Woodforde	6	2
(Germany) Marc-Kevin Goellner (Germany) David Prinosil	7	6
(Sweden) Stefan Edberg (Czech Republic) Petr Korda	6	1
(United States) Luke Jensen (United States) Murphy Jensen	7	6

Final
(Germany) Marc-Kevin Goellner (Germany) David Prinosil	4	7^{7}	4
(United States) Luke Jensen (United States) Murphy Jensen	6	6^{4}	6

=== Top half ===
==== Section 1 ====
First round
1	(Australia) T Woodbridge (Australia) M Woodforde	7	6
(Australia) N Borwick (Australia) S Youl	6	1
WC	(France) T Guardiola (France) L Roux	3	2
(Netherlands) T Kempers (United States) B Shelton	6	6
(South Africa) R Deppe (Czech Republic) D Rikl	2	6	6
(United States) J Pugh (United States) G Van Emburgh	6	3	4
WC	(France) T Champion (France) N Escudé	1	1
16	(Canada) G Michibata (United States) D Pate	6	6
9	(United States) S DeVries (Australia) D Macpherson	6	6
(Brazil) L Mattar (Brazil) J Oncins	7	7
(Czech Republic) M Damm (Czech Republic) T Anzari	3	1
(Czech Republic) L Pimek (New Zealand) B Steven	6	6
(South Africa) M Barnard (South Africa) B Haygarth	6	6	6
(Netherlands) HJ Davids (South Africa) P Norval	4	7	8
(Sweden) C Allgårdh (Netherlands) S Groen	3	1
8	(South Africa) D Adams (Russia) A Olhovskiy	6	6

Second round
(Australia) T Woodbridge (Australia) M Woodforde	4	6	6
(Netherlands) T Kempers (United States) B Shelton	6	3	4
(South Africa) R Deppe (Czech Republic) D Rikl	2	4
16	(Canada) G Michibata (United States) D Pate	6	6
(Brazil) L Mattar (Brazil) J Oncins	6	3	6
(Czech Republic) L Pimek (New Zealand) B Steven	4	6	3
(Netherlands) HJ Davids (South Africa) P Norval	6	7
8	(South Africa) D Adams (Russia) A Olhovskiy	4	6

Third round
1	(Australia) T Woodbridge (Australia) M Woodforde	3	6	6
16	(Canada) G Michibata (United States) D Pate	6	4	2
(Brazil) L Mattar (Brazil) J Oncins	6	3	7
(Netherlands) HJ Davids (South Africa) P Norval	3	6	9

Quarterfinals
1	(Australia) T Woodbridge (Australia) M Woodforde	6	6
(Netherlands) HJ Davids (South Africa) P Norval	2	2

==== Section 2 ====
First round
3	(Australia) M Kratzmann (Australia) W Masur	6	5	6
(Sweden) P Nyborg (Sweden) T Svantesson	3	7	2
(Sweden) R Bergh (Sweden) M Tillström	6	6
WC	(France) P Gauthier (France) G Marx	4	4
WC	(France) R Gilbert (France) G Raoux	1	4
(Spain) T Carbonell (Spain) C Costa	6	6
(Uruguay) D Pérez (Spain) F Roig	2	6
13	(Netherlands) T Nijssen (Czech Republic) C Suk	6	7
11	(United States) K Flach (United States) R Leach	6	6
(United States) M Briggs (United States) T Kronemann	4	4
WC	(France) F Santoro (France) S Simian	3	4
(United States) T Martin (United States) J Palmer	6	6
(Czech Republic) V Flégl (Denmark) M Mortensen	6	7
(United States) B Garnett (United States) TJ Middleton	4	6
(Germany) MC Goellner (Germany) D Prinosil	6	3	6
5	(United States) P McEnroe (United States) J Stark	4	6	3

Second round
3	(Australia) M Kratzmann (Australia) W Masur	6	6
(Sweden) R Bergh (Sweden) M Tillström	3	4
(Spain) T Carbonell (Spain) C Costa	6	7	6
13	(Netherlands) T Nijssen (Czech Republic) C Suk	7	5	4
11	(United States) K Flach (United States) R Leach	4	6	8
(United States) T Martin (United States) J Palmer	6	4	10
(Czech Republic) V Flégl (Denmark) M Mortensen	6	5
(Germany) MC Goellner (Germany) D Prinosil	7	7

Third round
3	(Australia) M Kratzmann (Australia) W Masur	6	6
(Spain) T Carbonell (Spain) C Costa	3	1
(United States) T Martin (United States) J Palmer	4	4
(Germany) MC Goellner (Germany) D Prinosil	6	6

Quarterfinals
3	(Australia) M Kratzmann (Australia) W Masur	4	4
(Germany) MC Goellner (Germany) D Prinosil	6	6

=== Bottom half ===
==== Section 3 ====
First round
6	(Canada) G Connell (United States) P Galbraith	2	6
(South Africa) JL de Jager (South Africa) M Ondruska	6	7
(Argentina) P Albano (Argentina) J Frana	6	6
(United Kingdom) N Broad (Germany) P Kühnen	3	4
WC	(France) A Boetsch (France) O Delaître	4	6	6
(Argentina) H de la Peña (Mexico) J Lozano	6	2	8
(United States) K Kinnear (Germany) C Saceanu	6	3	4
12	(Spain) S Casal (Spain) E Sánchez	4	6	6
14	(United States) S Cannon (United States) S Melville	5	6
WC	(France) JP Fleurian (France) C Pioline	7	7
(Sweden) S Edberg (Czech Republic) P Korda	6	4	6
(Australia) S Stolle (Australia) J Stoltenberg	3	6	4
(United States) M Keil (United States) D Randall	6	6	15
(Netherlands) M Koevermans (Netherlands) J Siemerink	4	7	13
(Sweden) J Donar (Sweden) O Jonsson	3	2
4	(Netherlands) J Eltingh (Netherlands) P Haarhuis	6	6

Second round
(South Africa) JL de Jager (South Africa) M Ondruska	2	2
(Argentina) P Albano (Argentina) J Frana	6	6
(Argentina) H de la Peña (Mexico) J Lozano	4	2
12	(Spain) S Casal (Spain) E Sánchez	6	6
WC	(France) JP Fleurian (France) C Pioline	3	1
(Sweden) S Edberg (Czech Republic) P Korda	6	6
(United States) M Keil (United States) D Randall	6	4	2
4	(Netherlands) J Eltingh (Netherlands) P Haarhuis	3	6	6

Third round
(Argentina) P Albano (Argentina) J Frana	3	6	3
12	(Spain) S Casal (Spain) E Sánchez	6	3	6
(Sweden) S Edberg (Czech Republic) P Korda	6	6
4	(Netherlands) J Eltingh (Netherlands) P Haarhuis	2	1

Quarterfinals
12	(Spain) S Casal (Spain) E Sánchez	5	1
(Sweden) S Edberg (Czech Republic) P Korda	7	6

==== Section 4 ====
First round
7	(South Africa) D Visser (Australia) L Warder	5	4
(Czech Republic) K Nováček (Germany) CU Steeb	7	6
(United States) L Jensen (United States) M Jensen	4	6	12
(United States) M Bauer (United States) T Nelson	6	4	10
(Sweden) J Apell (Sweden) J Björkman	7	2	5
(South Africa) W Ferreira (United States) T Witsken	6	6	7
(United States) B Pearce (South Africa) B Talbot	6	7
10	(Switzerland) J Hlasek (Switzerland) M Rosset	2	6
15	(United States) R Reneberg (United States) D Wheaton	4	7	6
(Croatia) G Ivanišević (France) H Leconte	6	6	8
(Brazil) C Motta (Spain) J Sánchez	6	4	6
(United Kingdom) J Bates (Zimbabwe) B Black	2	6	4
(Netherlands) M Oosting (Germany) U Riglewski	6	3	6
(Venezuela) M Ruah (United States) K Thorne	1	6	2
(Sweden) H Holm (Norway) BO Pedersen	1	2
2	(Australia) J Fitzgerald (Sweden) A Järryd	6	6

Second round
(Czech Republic) K Nováček (Germany) CU Steeb	3	7	10
(United States) L Jensen (United States) M Jensen	6	6	12
(South Africa) W Ferreira (United States) T Witsken	4	2
(United States) B Pearce (South Africa) B Talbot	6	6
(Croatia) G Ivanišević (France) H Leconte	6	7
(Brazil) C Motta (Spain) J Sánchez	4	6
(Netherlands) M Oosting (Germany) U Riglewski	3	4
2	(Australia) J Fitzgerald (Sweden) A Järryd	6	6

Third round
(United States) L Jensen (United States) M Jensen	6	1	7
(United States) B Pearce (South Africa) B Talbot	3	6	5
(Croatia) G Ivanišević (France) H Leconte	6	6
2	(Australia) J Fitzgerald (Sweden) A Järryd	4	2

Quarterfinals
(United States) L Jensen (United States) M Jensen	6	7	6
(Croatia) G Ivanišević (France) H Leconte	7	6	3
