= Andrew Ilie =

Australian tennis player (born 1976)

- Country (sports): Australia
- Born: 18 April 1976 (age 49) Bucharest, SR Romania
- Height: 1.80 m (5 ft 11 in)
- Turned pro: 1994
- Retired: 2003
- Plays: Right-handed (one-handed backhand)
- Prize money: $1,327,838

Singles
- Career record: 89–116
- Career titles: 2
- Highest ranking: No. 38 (29 May 2000)

Grand Slam singles results
- Australian Open: 4R (1999, 2001)
- French Open: 3R (1995, 1998, 1999)
- Wimbledon: 2R (1999)
- US Open: 2R (2001)

Other tournaments
- Olympic Games: 1R (2000)

Doubles
- Career record: 3–13
- Career titles: 0
- Highest ranking: No. 296 (12 June 2000)

Grand Slam doubles results
- Australian Open: 1R (1995, 2000, 2001)

Grand Slam mixed doubles results
- Australian Open: 1R (2000, 2001)
- Last updated on: 19 October 2021.

Andrew Ilie (born 18 April 1976) is a former tennis player. Ilie fled Romania at age 10 with his family, spending a year at a refugee camp in Austria before emigrating to Australia. He turned professional in 1994 and became a citizen of Australia. He was an Australian Institute of Sport scholarship holder. He won two ATP Tour singles titles (Coral Springs in 1998 and Atlanta in 2000), as well as five Challenger Series tournaments. Ilie reached his career-high singles ranking of World No. 38 on 29 May 2000.

== Career ==
=== Juniors ===
He reached the finals of the Australian Open Jrs in 1994.

=== Pro Tour ===
Ilie never progressed past the fourth round of a Grand Slam tournament, but was a fan-favorite, especially in Australia. Described in 2001 by tennis writer Jon Wertheim as "an emerging cult hero", Ilie developed an avid following whenever he played at the Australian Open in Melbourne. He became well known for adventurous and occasionally outrageous shots, and by ripping his shirt in glee whenever he won a particularly important or hard-fought match. The latter ritual began at the French Open in 1999, as Ilie celebrated his first-round victory in five sets over Jonas Bjorkman, and then repeated the gesture after his second-round victory, also in five sets, over Martin Rodriguez.

The last years of Ilie's career were marred by persistent injuries, including chronic osteitis pubis, which hampered his play. Ilie retired in November 2004. Following retirement, Ilie married and settled in Hong Kong.

== Junior Grand Slam finals ==
=== Singles: 1 (1 runner-up) ===
Result	Year	Championship	Surface	Opponent	Score
Loss	1994	Australian Open	Hard	(Australia) Ben Ellwood	7–5, 3–6, 3–6

== ATP career finals ==
=== Singles: 3 (2 titles, 1 runner-ups) ===
Legend Grand Slam Tournaments (0–0) ATP World Tour Finals (0–0) ATP World Tour Masters 1000 (0–0) ATP World Tour 500 Series (0–0) ATP World Tour 250 Series (2–1)	Finals by surface Hard (0–0) Clay (2–1) Grass (0–0) Carpet (0–0)	Finals by setting Outdoors (2–1) Indoors (0–0)

Result	W–L	Date	Tournament	Tier	Surface	Opponent	Score
Win	1–0	May 1998	Coral Springs, United States	World Series	Clay	(Italy) Davide Sanguinetti	7–5, 6–4
Win	2–0	Apr 2000	Atlanta, United States	International Series	Clay	(Australia) Jason Stoltenberg	6–3, 7–5
Loss	2–1	May 2000	St. Polten, Austria	International Series	Clay	(Romania) Andrei Pavel	5–7, 6–3, 2–6

== ATP Challenger and ITF Futures finals ==
=== Singles: 8 (6–2) ===
Legend ATP Challenger (5–2) ITF Futures (1–0)	Finals by surface Hard (2–0) Clay (4–2) Grass (0–0) Carpet (0–0)

Result	W–L	Date	Tournament	Tier	Surface	Opponent	Score
Win	1–0	Jul 1995	Lillehammer, Norway	Challenger	Clay	(Norway) Christian Ruud	6–3, 6–2
Win	2–0	Dec 1995	Perth, Australia	Challenger	Hard	(Germany) Michael Geserer	7–6, 6–4
Loss	2–1	Jun 1998	Prostejov, Czech Republic	Challenger	Clay	(Australia) Richard Fromberg	2–6, 2–6
Win	3–1	Jun 1998	Biella, Italy	Challenger	Clay	(France) Jean-Baptiste Perlant	6–7, 6–4, 6–4
Win	4–1	Jul 1998	Ostend, Belgium	Challenger	Clay	(Argentina) Martin Rodriguez	6–2, 6–2
Loss	4–2	Jul 1999	Ulm, Germany	Challenger	Clay	(Morocco) Younes El Aynaoui	6–7, 3–6
Win	5–2	Apr 2000	Paget, Bermuda	Challenger	Clay	(Czech Republic) Michal Tabara	4–6, 6–3, 6–2
Win	6–2	Feb 2003	USA F4, Brownsville	Futures	Hard	(United States) Doug Bohaboy	6–7^{(4–7)}, 6–3, 6–4

=== Doubles: 2 (0–2) ===
Legend ATP Challenger (0–2) ITF Futures (0–0)	Finals by surface Hard (0–1) Clay (0–1) Grass (0–0) Carpet (0–0)

Result	W–L	Date	Tournament	Tier	Surface	Partner	Opponents	Score
Loss	0–1	Jul 1995	Lillehammer, Norway	Challenger	Clay	(Australia) Todd Larkham	(Sweden) Thomas Johansson (Sweden) Lars-Anders Wahlgren	6–3, 3–6, 3–6
Loss	0–2	Oct 1999	Tel Aviv, Israel	Challenger	Hard	(Israel) Amir Hadad	(Israel) Noam Behr (Israel) Eyal Ran	3–6, 2–6

== Performance timeline ==
Key
W	F	SF	QF	#R	RR	Q#	DNQ	A	NH

(W) winner; (F) finalist; (SF) semifinalist; (QF) quarterfinalist; (#R) rounds 4, 3, 2, 1; (RR) round-robin stage; (Q#) qualification round; (DNQ) did not qualify; (A) absent; (NH) not held; (SR) strike rate (events won / competed); (W–L) win–loss record.

=== Singles ===
Tournament	1993	1994	1995	1996	1997	1998	1999	2000	2001	2002	2003	SR	W–L	Win %
Grand Slam tournaments
Australian Open	Q1	Q1	1R	1R	Q1	3R	4R	3R	4R	1R	1R	0 / 8	10–8	56%
French Open	A	A	3R	Q3	A	3R	3R	2R	1R	1R	A	0 / 6	7–6	54%
Wimbledon	A	Q1	A	1R	A	A	2R	1R	1R	A	A	0 / 4	1–4	20%
US Open	A	Q1	A	A	A	1R	1R	1R	2R	A	Q1	0 / 4	1–4	20%
Win–loss	0–0	0–0	2–2	0–2	0–0	4–3	6–4	3–4	4–4	0–2	0–1	0 / 22	19–22	46%
ATP Masters Series
Indian Wells	A	A	A	Q1	A	A	A	1R	1R	A	A	0 / 2	0–2	0%
Miami	A	A	A	Q1	A	A	2R	Q1	2R	A	A	0 / 2	2–2	50%
Monte Carlo	A	A	A	A	A	A	1R	A	2R	A	A	0 / 2	1–2	33%
Hamburg	A	A	A	A	A	A	1R	A	3R	A	A	0 / 2	2–2	50%
Rome	A	A	A	A	A	A	1R	A	1R	A	A	0 / 2	0–2	0%
Canada	A	A	A	A	A	1R	2R	2R	1R	A	A	0 / 4	2–4	33%
Cincinnati	A	A	A	A	A	1R	1R	1R	A	A	A	0 / 3	0–3	0%
Paris	A	A	A	A	A	Q1	A	A	A	A	A	0 / 0	0–0	–
Win–loss	0–0	0–0	0–0	0–0	0–0	0–2	2–6	1–3	4–6	0–0	0–0	0 / 17	7–17	29%
