= Steve Campbell (tennis) =

American tennis player

- Country (sports): United States
- Residence: Detroit, Michigan, U.S.
- Born: October 22, 1970 (age 55) Buffalo, New York, U.S.
- Height: 6 ft 0 in (1.83 m)
- Turned pro: 1993
- Plays: Right-handed
- Prize money: $484,898

Singles
- Career record: 32–54
- Career titles: 0
- Highest ranking: No. 78 (April 13, 1998)

Grand Slam singles results
- Australian Open: 3R (1998)
- French Open: 1R (1998)
- Wimbledon: 1R (1998)
- US Open: 1R (1995, 1997, 1998)

Doubles
- Career record: 6–10
- Career titles: 0
- Highest ranking: No. 184 (June 24, 1996)

Grand Slam doubles results
- Wimbledon: Q1 (1997)

Steve Campbell (born October 22, 1970) is a former professional tennis player from the United States.

== Career ==
Campbell grew up in Michigan where he attended Detroit Catholic Central High School, winning individual state championships all four years along with back-to-back team state championships. He was an All-American while at Rice University.

At the 1989 Boys' Junior National Tennis Championship, he lost in the 1st round of the Boys' 18 singles, but he and Rick Witsken reached the finals of the Boys' 18 doubles, falling to Cary Lothringer and Brian MacPhie.

He made his Grand Slam debut at the 1995 Australian Open and defeated countryman Chuck Adams in the opening encounter, before losing his second round match to Patrick Rafter. The American pushed veteran Mats Wilander to five sets in the US Open but he would have to wait until the 1998 Australian Open for his second win. In that tournament he beat both Justin Gimelstob and Alex O'Brien to make it into the third round, his best ever showing in a Grand Slam.

Although predominantly a singles player, Campbell's only ATP Tour final was in the doubles, at Bogotá, where he and MaliVai Washington finished runners-up in 1995. He made the singles semi-finals of the 1997 International Tennis Championships but had by far his best performances in 1998. After starting the year well at the Australian Open, Campbell won three matches at the Lipton Championships in Miami (an ATP Super 9 event), reaching the quarterfinals. He was also a quarterfinalist at Atlanta and again in the Heineken Trophy, where he upset world number seven Yevgeny Kafelnikov.

== ATP career finals ==
=== Doubles: 1 (0–1) ===
Result	No.	Date	Tournament	Surface	Partner	Opponents	Score
Loss	0–1	Sep 1995	Bogotá, Colombia	Clay	(United States) MaliVai Washington	(Czech Republic) Jiří Novák (Czech Republic) David Rikl	6–7, 2–6

== Challenger titles ==
=== Singles: (2) ===
No.	Year	Tournament	Surface	Opponent	Score
1.	1995	Belo Horizonte, Brazil	Hard	(Portugal) João Cunha-Silva	6–2, 6–3
2.	1997	Ixtapa, Mexico	Hard	(Finland) Tuomas Ketola	7–6, 6–1
