= Delray Beach Open =

Tennis tournament

Coordinates: 26.463°N 80.075°W

ATP Tour
- Founded: 1993; 33 years ago
- Location: Delray Beach, Florida; United States
- Venue: Delray Beach Tennis Center
- Category: ATP World Series (1993–1997); ATP International Series (1998–2008); ATP 250 (2009–current)
- Surface: Clay / outdoor (1993–1999); Hard / outdoor (2000–present) (Note: Plexipave 2000–present)
- Draw: 32S/12Q/16D
- Prize money: US$710,735 (2025)
- Website: Website

Current champions (2025)
- Singles: (Serbia) Miomir Kecmanović
- Doubles: (Serbia) Miomir Kecmanović (United States) Brandon Nakashima

The Delray Beach Open is an ATP 250 professional tennis tournament held annually in Delray Beach, Florida, United States, on hardcourts.

It was previously known as America's Red Clay Championships, Citrix Tennis Championships, and the Delray Beach International Tennis Championships (ITC). The event was held in Coral Springs from 1993 to 1998; in 1999, it was relocated to the Delray Beach Tennis Center. American Todd Martin won the tournament's first singles event in 1993. The tournament was renamed to its current name in 2014.

== Past finals ==
=== Singles ===
Location	Year	Champions	Runners-up	Score
Delray Beach, Florida
Delray Beach, Florida	2026	(United States) Sebastian Korda	(United States) Tommy Paul	6–4, 6–3
Delray Beach, Florida	2025	(Serbia) Miomir Kecmanović	(Spain) Alejandro Davidovich Fokina	3–6, 6–1, 7–5
Delray Beach, Florida	2024	(United States) Taylor Fritz (2)	(United States) Tommy Paul	6–2, 6–3
Delray Beach, Florida	2023	(United States) Taylor Fritz	(Serbia) Miomir Kecmanović	6–0, 5–7, 6–2
Delray Beach, Florida	2022	(United Kingdom) Cameron Norrie	(United States) Reilly Opelka	7–6^{(7–1)}, 7–6^{(7–4)}
Delray Beach, Florida	2021	(Poland) Hubert Hurkacz	(United States) Sebastian Korda	6–3, 6–3
Delray Beach, Florida	2020	(United States) Reilly Opelka	(Japan) Yoshihito Nishioka	7–5, 6–7^{(4–7)}, 6–2
Delray Beach, Florida	2019	(Moldova) Radu Albot	(United Kingdom) Dan Evans	3–6, 6–3, 7–6^{(9–7)}
Delray Beach, Florida	2018	(United States) Frances Tiafoe	(Germany) Peter Gojowczyk	6–1, 6–4
Delray Beach, Florida	2017	(United States) Jack Sock	(Canada) Milos Raonic	Walkover
Delray Beach, Florida	2016	(United States) Sam Querrey	(United States) Rajeev Ram	6–4, 7–6^{(8–6)}
Delray Beach, Florida	2015	(Croatia) Ivo Karlović	(United States) Donald Young	6–3, 6–3
Delray Beach, Florida	2014	(Croatia) Marin Čilić	(South Africa) Kevin Anderson	7–6^{(8–6)}, 6–7^{(7–9)}, 6–4
Delray Beach, Florida	2013	(Latvia) Ernests Gulbis (2)	(France) Édouard Roger-Vasselin	7–6^{(7–3)}, 6–3
Delray Beach, Florida	2012	(South Africa) Kevin Anderson	(Australia) Marinko Matosevic	6–4, 7–6^{(7–2)}
Delray Beach, Florida	2011	(Argentina) Juan Martín del Potro	(Serbia) Janko Tipsarević	6–4, 6–4
Delray Beach, Florida	2010	(Latvia) Ernests Gulbis	(Croatia) Ivo Karlović	6–2, 6–3
Delray Beach, Florida	2009	(United States) Mardy Fish	(Russia) Evgeny Korolev	7–5, 6–3
Delray Beach, Florida	2008	(Japan) Kei Nishikori	(United States) James Blake	3–6, 6–1, 6–4
Delray Beach, Florida	2007	(Belgium) Xavier Malisse (2)	(United States) James Blake	5–7, 6–4, 6–4
Delray Beach, Florida	2006	(Germany) Tommy Haas	(Belgium) Xavier Malisse	6–3, 3–6, 7–6^{(7–5)}
Delray Beach, Florida	2005	(Belgium) Xavier Malisse	(Czech Republic) Jiří Novák	7–6^{(8–6)}, 6–2
Delray Beach, Florida	2004	(Brazil) Ricardo Mello	(United States) Vincent Spadea	7–6^{(7–2)}, 6–3
Delray Beach, Florida	2003	(United States) Jan-Michael Gambill (2)	(United States) Mardy Fish	6–0, 7–6^{(7–5)}
Delray Beach, Florida	2002	(Italy) Davide Sanguinetti	(United States) Andy Roddick	6–4, 4–6, 6–4
Delray Beach, Florida	2001	(United States) Jan-Michael Gambill	(Belgium) Xavier Malisse	7–5, 6–4
Delray Beach, Florida	2000	(Austria) Stefan Koubek	(Spain) Álex Calatrava	6–1, 4–6, 6–4
Delray Beach, Florida	1999	(Australia) Lleyton Hewitt	(Belgium) Xavier Malisse	6–4, 6–7^{(2–7)}, 6–1
Coral Springs, Florida
Coral Springs, Florida	1998	(Australia) Andrew Ilie	(Italy) Davide Sanguinetti	7–5, 6–4
Coral Springs, Florida	1997	(Australia) Jason Stoltenberg (2)	(Sweden) Jonas Björkman	6–0, 2–6, 7–5
Coral Springs, Florida	1996	(Australia) Jason Stoltenberg	(United States) Chris Woodruff	7–6^{(7–4)}, 2–6, 7–5
Coral Springs, Florida	1995	(Australia) Todd Woodbridge	(United Kingdom) Greg Rusedski	6–4, 6–2
Coral Springs, Florida	1994	(Brazil) Luiz Mattar	(Australia) Jamie Morgan	6–4, 3–6, 6–3
Coral Springs, Florida	1993	(United States) Todd Martin	(United States) David Wheaton	6–3, 6–4

=== Doubles ===
Location	Year	Champions	Runners-up	Score
Delray Beach, Florida	2025	(Serbia) Miomir Kecmanović (United States) Brandon Nakashima	(United States) Christian Harrison (United States) Evan King	7–6^{(7–3)}, 1–6, [10–3]
Delray Beach, Florida	2024	(United Kingdom) Julian Cash (United States) Robert Galloway	(Mexico) Santiago González (United Kingdom) Neal Skupski	5–7, 7–5, [10–2]
Delray Beach, Florida	2023	(El Salvador) Marcelo Arévalo (Netherlands) Jean-Julien Rojer	(Australia) Rinky Hijikata (United States) Reese Stalder	6–3, 6–4
Delray Beach, Florida	2022	(El Salvador) Marcelo Arévalo (Netherlands) Jean-Julien Rojer	(Kazakhstan) Aleksandr Nedovyesov (Pakistan) Aisam-ul-Haq Qureshi	6–2, 6–7^{(5–7)}, [10–4]
Delray Beach, Florida	2021	(Uruguay) Ariel Behar (Ecuador) Gonzalo Escobar	(United States) Christian Harrison (United States) Ryan Harrison	6–7^{(5–7)}, 7–6^{(7–4)}, [10–4]
Delray Beach, Florida	2020	(United States) Bob Bryan (United States) Mike Bryan	(United Kingdom) Luke Bambridge (Japan) Ben McLachlan	3–6, 7–5, [10–5]
Delray Beach, Florida	2019	(United States) Bob Bryan (United States) Mike Bryan	(United Kingdom) Ken Skupski (United Kingdom) Neal Skupski	7–6^{(7–5)}, 6–4
Delray Beach, Florida	2018	(United States) Jack Sock (United States) Jackson Withrow	(United States) Nicholas Monroe (Australia) John-Patrick Smith	4–6, 6–4, [10–8]
Delray Beach, Florida	2017	(South Africa) Raven Klaasen (United States) Rajeev Ram	(Philippines) Treat Huey (Belarus) Max Mirnyi	7–5, 7–5
Delray Beach, Florida	2016	(Austria) Oliver Marach (France) Fabrice Martin	(United States) Bob Bryan (United States) Mike Bryan	3–6, 7–6^{(9–7)}, [13–11]
Delray Beach, Florida	2015	(United States) Bob Bryan (United States) Mike Bryan	(South Africa) Raven Klaasen (India) Leander Paes	6–3, 3–6, [10–6]
Delray Beach, Florida	2014	(United States) Bob Bryan (United States) Mike Bryan	(Czech Republic) František Čermák (Russia) Mikhail Elgin	6–2, 6–3
Delray Beach, Florida	2013	(United States) James Blake (United States) Jack Sock	(Romania) Horia Tecău (Belarus) Max Mirnyi	6–4, 6–4
Delray Beach, Florida	2012	(United Kingdom) Colin Fleming (United Kingdom) Ross Hutchins	(Slovakia) Michal Mertiňák (Brazil) André Sá	2–6, 7–6^{(7–5)}, [15–13]
Delray Beach, Florida	2011	(United States) Scott Lipsky (United States) Rajeev Ram	(Germany) Christopher Kas (Austria) Alexander Peya	4–6, 6–4, [10–3]
Delray Beach, Florida	2010	(United States) Bob Bryan (United States) Mike Bryan	(Germany) Philipp Marx (Slovakia) Igor Zelenay	6–3, 7–6^{(7–3)}
Delray Beach, Florida	2009	(United States) Bob Bryan (United States) Mike Bryan	(Brazil) Marcelo Melo (Brazil) André Sá	6–4, 6–4
Delray Beach, Florida	2008	(Belarus) Max Mirnyi (United Kingdom) Jamie Murray	(United States) Bob Bryan (United States) Mike Bryan	6–4, 3–6, [10–6]
Delray Beach, Florida	2007	(Belgium) Xavier Malisse (United States) Hugo Armando	(United Kingdom) James Auckland (Australia) Stephen Huss	6–3, 6–7^{(4–7)}, [10–5]
Delray Beach, Florida	2006	(The Bahamas) Mark Knowles (Canada) Daniel Nestor	(South Africa) Chris Haggard (South Africa) Wesley Moodie	6–2, 6–3
Delray Beach, Florida	2005	(Sweden) Simon Aspelin (Australia) Todd Perry	(Australia) Jordan Kerr (United States) Jim Thomas	6–3, 6–3
Delray Beach, Florida	2004	(India) Leander Paes (Czech Republic) Radek Štěpánek	(Argentina) Gastón Etlis (Argentina) Martín Rodríguez	6–0, 6–3
Delray Beach, Florida	2003	(India) Leander Paes (Serbia and Montenegro) Nenad Zimonjić	(Netherlands) Raemon Sluiter (Netherlands) Martin Verkerk	7–5, 3–6, 7–5
Delray Beach, Florida	2002	(Czech Republic) Martin Damm (Czech Republic) Cyril Suk	(South Africa) David Adams (Australia) Ben Ellwood	6–4, 6–7^{(5–7)}, [10–5]
Delray Beach, Florida	2001	(United States) Jan-Michael Gambill (United States) Andy Roddick	(Japan) Thomas Shimada (South Africa) Myles Wakefield	6–3, 6–4
Delray Beach, Florida	2000	(United States) Brian MacPhie (Federal Republic of Yugoslavia) Nenad Zimonjić	(Australia) Joshua Eagle (Australia) Andrew Florent	7–5, 6–4
Delray Beach, Florida	1999	(Belarus) Max Mirnyi (Federal Republic of Yugoslavia) Nenad Zimonjić	(United States) Doug Flach (United States) Brian MacPhie	7–6^{(7–3)}, 3–6, 6–3
Coral Springs, Florida	1998	(South Africa) Grant Stafford (Zimbabwe) Kevin Ullyett	(The Bahamas) Mark Merklein (United States) Vince Spadea	7–5, 6–4
Coral Springs, Florida	1997	(United States) Dave Randall (United States) Greg Van Emburgh	(United States) Luke Jensen (United States) Murphy Jensen	6–7, 6–2, 7–6
Coral Springs, Florida	1996	(Australia) Todd Woodbridge (Australia) Mark Woodforde	(United States) Ivan Baron (United States) Brett Hansen-Dent	6–3, 6–3
Coral Springs, Florida	1995	(Australia) Todd Woodbridge (Australia) Mark Woodforde	(Spain) Sergio Casal (Spain) Emilio Sánchez	6–3, 6–1
Coral Springs, Florida	1994	(South Africa) Lan Bale (New Zealand) Brett Steven	(United States) Ken Flach (France) Stephane Simian	6–3, 7–5
Coral Springs, Florida	1993	(United States) Patrick McEnroe (United States) Jonathan Stark	(United States) Paul Annacone (United States) Doug Flach	6–4, 6–3

== See also ==
- List of tennis tournaments
