= Geoff Grant (tennis) =

American tennis player

- Country (sports): United States
- Residence: New York City, New York
- Born: January 16, 1970 (age 55); Englewood, NJ, USA
- Height: 1.82 m (6 ft 0 in)
- Turned pro: 1994
- Retired: 2003
- Plays: Right-handed
- Prize money: US$351,932

Singles
- Career record: 8–19
- Career titles: 0
- Highest ranking: No. 109 (November 9, 1998)

Grand Slam singles results
- Australian Open: 1R (1997, 1999)
- US Open: 3R (1998)

Doubles
- Career record: 20–34
- Career titles: 0
- Highest ranking: No. 90 (May 24, 1999)

Grand Slam doubles results
- Australian Open: 2R (1997, 2000)
- French Open: 1R (1998, 1999)
- Wimbledon: 1R (1998, 1999)
- US Open: 2R (1999)
- Last updated on: October 17, 2013.

Geoff Grant is an American former professional tour tennis player.

== Biography ==
Grant reached a career high tour singles ranking of World No. 109 in November 1998. This came shortly after he achieved his best tournament result, reaching the third round of the 1998 U.S. Open, as a wild card entrant. In that tournament he defeated World No. 101 Javier Sánchez in four sets and No. 74 Andrei Medvedev in four before falling to No. 92 Oliver Gross in five set, 5–7 in the fifth. At the previous Open, Grant also accounted for himself well taking World No. 9 Gustavo Kuerten to five sets. In only other two appearances in the main draw of a Grand Slam event, Grant lost in the first round of the Australian Open in straight sets (1997 and 1999).

In 1997, Grant compiled the best singles recond in Challenger event play, 30 wins against 14 losses. This included winning the Lubbock Challenger. His career high doubles ranking was World No. 90, which he reached in May, 1999.

While on tour (at least), Grant resided in Watertown, Massachusetts.

== Sources ==
- ATP Website profile page
