= Murphy Jensen =

American tennis player (born 1968)

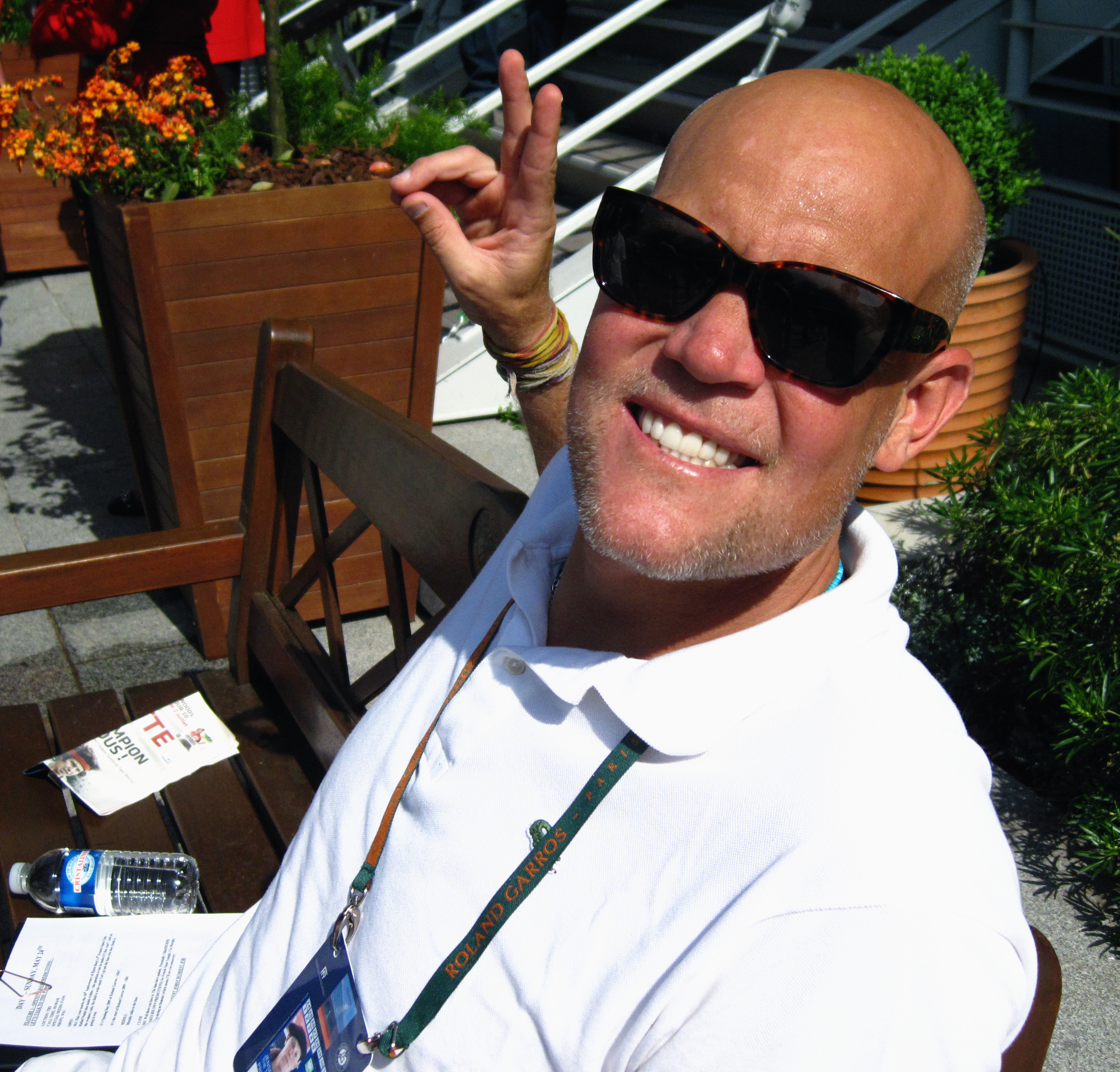
- Jensen in 2009
- Country (sports): United States
- Born: October 30, 1968 (age 57) Ludington, Michigan, U.S.
- Height: 6 ft 4 in (193 cm)
- Turned pro: 1991
- Retired: 2006
- Plays: Left-handed (one-handed backhand)
- College: University of Southern California; University of Georgia
- Prize money: $681,817

Singles
- Career record: 0–5
- Career titles: 0; 0 Challenger, 0 Futures
- Highest ranking: No. 586 (11 January 1993)

Grand Slam singles results
- Australian Open: Q2 (1992)

Doubles
- Career record: 125–179
- Career titles: 4; 3 Challenger, 0 Futures
- Highest ranking: No. 17 (18 October 1993)

Grand Slam doubles results
- Australian Open: 2R (1993, 1994, 1995)
- French Open: W (1993)
- Wimbledon: 2R (1993)
- US Open: 3R (1994, 1995, 1998)

Grand Slam mixed doubles results
- Australian Open: 1R (1994, 1996)
- French Open: SF (1993)
- Wimbledon: 2R (1995)
- US Open: QF (1994)

Murphy Jensen (born October 30, 1968) is an American former professional tennis player and Grand Slam doubles champion. He is the younger brother of former professional tennis player Luke Jensen, with whom he teamed to win the 1993 French Open Doubles title.

He is the co-founder of WEconnect, a healthcare information technology company with a platform designed to aid addiction recovery, and currently the head coach of the Washington Kastles of World TeamTennis.

== Early life ==
Murphy Jensen grew up on a Christmas-tree farm in the summer resort town of Ludington in western Michigan. He is of Danish descent. He first saw a tennis net being used to corral salmon along the Pere Marquette River as a boy. His father (who tried out with the New York Giants as an offensive guard and then became a high school tennis coach) Howard Jensen, taught Murphy and brother Luke to play tennis before they were 5 years old.

=== Collegiate tennis career ===
Jensen and his brother Luke both attended the University of Southern California in Los Angeles, California. After two years playing for the USC Trojans, Murphy transferred to the University of Georgia for one year and then turned professional to pursue a career in tennis and to join his brother Luke on the ATP Tour.

== Business ownership and activism ==
After winning the 1993 French Open with Luke, the Jensen brothers became a center-court attraction. Murphy turned to drugs and alcohol to cope with the stress of his new-found success and celebrity status. In 1995, he missed a mixed-doubles match at Wimbledon with Brenda Schultz-McCarthy and his family feared he had been kidnapped. During this period of his life Murphy partnered with the very popular Jimmy Buffett to open a Bait Shack in Key West.

After losing in the first round of the 1999 US Open, feeling the pressure of work and family responsibilities (his son, William, was born a few weeks after the tournament), Jensen found himself in the throes of addiction. A hotel manager noticed Jensen's apparent crisis and contacted an interventionist, who asked Jensen to consider treatment for addiction recovery. Jensen agreed, and has since been in recovery from alcohol and drug addiction.

In 2014, Jensen met serial entrepreneur Daniella Tudor, also in treatment for addiction recovery. After leaving recovery, the two worked together towards improving addiction recovery awareness. In 2016, Jensen, Tudor, and business owner Jen Mallory co-founded WEconnect, a web application platform designed to assist patients with addiction recovery after treatment. Described as a "social-purpose corporation", WEconnect's business platform is centered around providing "accountability for an individual's recovery activities by closing the gap in communication with their support network." In June 2016, WEconnect won the TechCrunch Seattle Meet-Up, and was then chosen as the wildcard battlefield startup at TechCrunch Disrupt San Francisco in September later that year.

== Personal life ==
Jensen has a son William (born 1999) with actress Robin Givens, whom he dated periodically during the late 1990s.

Jensen has been open about his addiction and the factors that led to his recovery. He has been in long-term recovery and sober since June 1, 2006, and he cites his close relationships with recovery mentors as one of the key factors in preventing relapse.

== ATP career finals ==
=== Doubles: 11 (4 titles, 7 runner-ups) ===
Legend Grand Slam Tournaments (1–0) ATP World Tour Finals (0–0) ATP Masters Series (0–0) ATP Championship Series (1–1) ATP World Series (2–6)	Finals by surface Hard (2–1) Clay (1–5) Grass (1–0) Carpet (0–1)	Finals by setting Outdoors (4–6) Indoors (0–1)

Result	W–L	Date	Tournament	Tier	Surface	Partner	Opponents	Score
Loss	0–1	Jan 1993	Sydney, Australia	World Series	Hard	(United States) Luke Jensen	(Australia) Sandon Stolle (Australia) Jason Stoltenberg	3–6, 4–6
Loss	0–2	May 1993	Bologna, Italy	World Series	Clay	(United States) Luke Jensen	(South Africa) Danie Visser (Australia) Laurie Warder	6–4, 4–6, 4–6
Win	1–2	Jun 1993	Paris, France	Grand Slam	Clay	(United States) Luke Jensen	(Germany) Marc-Kevin Goellner (Germany) David Prinosil	6–4, 6–7, 6–4
Loss	1–3	Oct 1993	Tokyo, Japan	Championship Series	Carpet	(United States) Luke Jensen	(Canada) Grant Connell (United States) Patrick Galbraith	3–6, 4–6
Loss	1–4	Feb 1994	Mexico City, Mexico	World Series	Clay	(United States) Luke Jensen	(United States) Francisco Montana (United States) Bryan Shelton	3–6, 4–6
Loss	1–5	Sep 1994	Bogota, Colombia	World Series	Clay	(United States) Luke Jensen	(The Bahamas) Mark Knowles (Canada) Daniel Nestor	4–6, 6–7
Win	2–5	Jun 1995	Nottingham, United Kingdom	World Series	Grass	(United States) Luke Jensen	(South Africa) Danie Visser (United States) Patrick Galbraith	6–3, 5–7, 6–4
Win	3–5	Aug 1996	Long Island, United States	World Series	Hard	(United States) Luke Jensen	(Germany) Hendrik Dreekmann (Russia) Alexander Volkov	6–3, 7–6
Loss	3–6	May 1997	Coral Springs, United States	World Series	Clay	(United States) Luke Jensen	(United States) Dave Randall (United States) Greg Van Emburgh	7–6^{(7–2)}, 2–6, 6–7^{(2–7)}
Loss	3–7	May 1997	St. Pölten, Austria	World Series	Clay	(United States) Luke Jensen	(United States) Kelly Jones (United States) Scott Melville	2–6, 6–7
Win	4–7	Jul 1997	Washington, United States	Championship Series	Hard	(United States) Luke Jensen	(South Africa) Neville Godwin (Netherlands) Fernon Wibier	6–4, 6–4

== ATP Challenger and ITF Futures finals ==
=== Doubles: 5 (3–2) ===
Legend ATP Challenger (3–2) ITF Futures (0–0)	Finals by surface Hard (1–1) Clay (2–1) Grass (0–0) Carpet (0–0)

Result	W–L	Date	Tournament	Tier	Surface	Partner	Opponents	Score
Win	1–0	Aug 1991	Salou, Spain	Challenger	Clay	(United States) Francisco Montana	(Australia) Wayne Arthurs (Australia) Carl Limberger	5–7, 6–2, 7–5
Win	2–0	Dec 1991	Hong Kong, Hong Kong	Challenger	Hard	(United States) Luke Jensen	(United States) Mike Briggs (United States) Trevor Kronemann	walkover
Loss	2–1	Mar 1992	Zaragoza, Spain	Challenger	Hard	(Czech Republic) Martin Damm	(South Africa) David Adams (Russia) Andrei Olhovskiy	2–6, 6–1, 4–6
Loss	2–2	Jun 1992	Cologne, Germany	Challenger	Clay	(United States) Brian Devening	(Germany) Marc-Kevin Goellner (Germany) Bernd Karbacher	4–6, 7–6, 1–6
Win	3–2	Apr 1997	Birmingham, United States	Challenger	Clay	(United States) Luke Jensen	(Sweden) Fredrik Bergh (Sweden) Rikard Bergh	6–2, 7–6

== Performance timelines ==
Key
W	F	SF	QF	#R	RR	Q#	DNQ	A	NH

(W) winner; (F) finalist; (SF) semifinalist; (QF) quarterfinalist; (#R) rounds 4, 3, 2, 1; (RR) round-robin stage; (Q#) qualification round; (DNQ) did not qualify; (A) absent; (NH) not held; (SR) strike rate (events won / competed); (W–L) win–loss record.

=== Doubles ===
Tournament	1991	1992	1993	1994	1995	1996	1997	1998	1999	2000	2001	2002	SR	W–L	Win %
Grand Slam tournaments
Australian Open	A	A	2R	2R	2R	1R	1R	A	A	1R	A	A	0 / 6	3–6	33%
French Open	A	A	W	3R	QF	1R	3R	1R	A	A	A	A	1 / 6	13–5	72%
Wimbledon	Q1	A	2R	1R	1R	1R	1R	1R	A	A	A	A	0 / 6	1–6	14%
US Open	A	A	2R	3R	3R	1R	1R	3R	1R	A	A	A	0 / 7	7–7	50%
Win–loss	0–0	0–0	9–3	5–4	6–4	0–4	2–4	2–3	0–1	0–1	0–0	0–0	1 / 25	24–24	50%
Year-end Championships
ATP Finals	DNQ		RR	Did not qualify									0 / 1	0–3	0%
ATP Masters Series
Indian Wells	A	A	Q2	2R	SF	1R	2R	1R	A	Q1	A	A	0 / 5	5–5	50%
Miami	A	A	1R	2R	1R	1R	1R	2R	A	1R	A	A	0 / 7	1–7	13%
Monte Carlo	A	A	2R	1R	1R	A	A	A	A	A	A	A	0 / 3	1–3	25%
Hamburg	A	A	1R	A	A	A	A	A	A	A	A	A	0 / 1	0–1	0%
Rome	A	A	SF	2R	A	A	A	2R	A	A	A	A	0 / 3	5–3	63%
Canada	A	A	A	A	A	A	1R	1R	A	A	A	A	0 / 2	0–2	0%
Cincinnati	A	A	1R	2R	1R	2R	2R	1R	A	A	1R	1R	0 / 8	3–8	27%
Paris	A	A	2R	A	A	A	A	A	A	A	A	A	0 / 1	0–1	0%
Win–loss	0–0	0–0	4–6	3–5	3–4	1–3	2–4	2–5	0–0	0–1	0–1	0–1	0 / 30	15–30	33%

=== Mixed doubles ===
Tournament	1993	1994	1995	1996	1997	SR	W–L	Win %
Grand Slam tournaments
Australian Open	A	1R	A	1R	A	0 / 2	0–2	0%
French Open	SF	1R	1R	1R	A	0 / 4	4–4	50%
Wimbledon	1R	1R	2R	A	1R	0 / 4	1–4	20%
US Open	2R	QF	A	A	1R	0 / 3	3–3	50%
Win–loss	5–3	2–4	1–2	0–2	0–2	0 / 13	8–13	38%

== Film and television career ==
Since retiring from the game, Jensen has acted in bit parts in films such as Wimbledon (2004) and more recently Tennis, Anyone. He currently hosts several programs on the Tennis Channel, including Open Access and Murphy's Guide.

On Open Access Jensen reports on high-profile tennis events around the world and interviews participating players about their lives and careers.

Each episode of the more comedic Murphy's Guide is a guide for tourists to a particular city where a major tennis tournament is taking place, such as Paris, London, New York, Melbourne etc. At least one major player appears at some point in the episode, and there is usually a brief segment about where enthusiasts of the game can play when in town, but the show's content mainly features Jensen attempting to navigate the city's sights, trying exotic food, and interacting with locals in his unique style. Through his experiences and misadventures, however, specific travel information about local hotels, restaurants, and attractions is conveyed, often with the help of animated maps and graphics. Many episodes also feature a scripted opening sequence, such as Jensen being made to walk the plank by the pirates of Treasure Island in Las Vegas, being psychoanalyzed by Sigmund Freud in Vienna, and impersonating James Bond and Crocodile Dundee in London and Melbourne, respectively.
