= Doug Flach =

American tennis player

- Country (sports): United States
- Residence: Alpharetta, Georgia, United States
- Born: August 10, 1970 (age 54); St. Louis, Missouri, U.S.
- Height: 1.83 m (6 ft 0 in)
- Turned pro: 1987
- Retired: 2001
- Prize money: US$678,432

Singles
- Career record: 28–46
- Career titles: 0
- Highest ranking: 108 (March 21, 1994)

Grand Slam singles results
- Wimbledon: 3R (1996)
- US Open: 2R (1993, 1996)

Doubles
- Career record: 82-90
- Career titles: 2
- Highest ranking: 73 (June 6, 1994)

Doug Flach (born August 10, 1970) is a former tennis player from the United States.

Flach won two doubles titles during his career. The right-hander reached his highest individual ranking on the ATP Tour on March 21, 1994, when he reached World No. 108. He defeated Andre Agassi (seeded third) in the first round at Wimbledon in 1996 but lost in the third round. He also defeated Agassi in 1997 at Washington, D.C.

Additionally, Flach had career wins over Ivan Lendl, Pat Rafter, Gustavo Kuerten, and Thomas Johansson. Flach won two doubles titles: one with Paul Annacone and the other with Sandon Stolle. He retired in 1999.

Flach was an All-American at the University of Tennessee in 1990. His older brother Ken was a prominent tour doubles player in the late 1980s and early 1990s.

== Career finals ==
=== Doubles: (2 titles, 4 runner-ups) ===
Result	W/L	Date	Tournament	Surface	Partner	Opponents	Score
Loss	0–1	Aug 1991	Long Island	Hard	(Italy) Diego Nargiso	(Germany) Eric Jelen (Germany) Carl-Uwe Steeb	6–0, 4–6, 6–7
Loss	0–2	May 1993	Coral Springs, U.S.	Clay	(United States) Paul Annacone	(United States) Patrick McEnroe (United States) Jonathan Stark	4–6, 3–6
Win	1–2	Oct 1993	Beijing, China	Carpet (i)	(United States) Paul Annacone	(Netherlands) Jacco Eltingh (Netherlands) Paul Haarhuis	7–6, 6–3
Loss	1–3	Jul 1996	Washington, U.S.	Hard	(United States) Chris Woodruff	(Canada) Grant Connell (United States) Scott Davis	6–7, 6–3, 3–6
Win	2–3	Jul 1998	Newport, US	Grass	(Australia) Sandon Stolle	(Australia) Scott Draper (Australia) Jason Stoltenberg	6–2, 4–6, 7–6
Loss	2–4	May 1999	Delray Beach, U.S.	Clay	(United States) Brian MacPhie	(Belarus) Max Mirnyi (Socialist Federal Republic of Yugoslavia) Nenad Zimonjić	6–7^{(3–7)}, 6–3, 3–6
