= Luke Jensen =

American tennis player (born 1966)

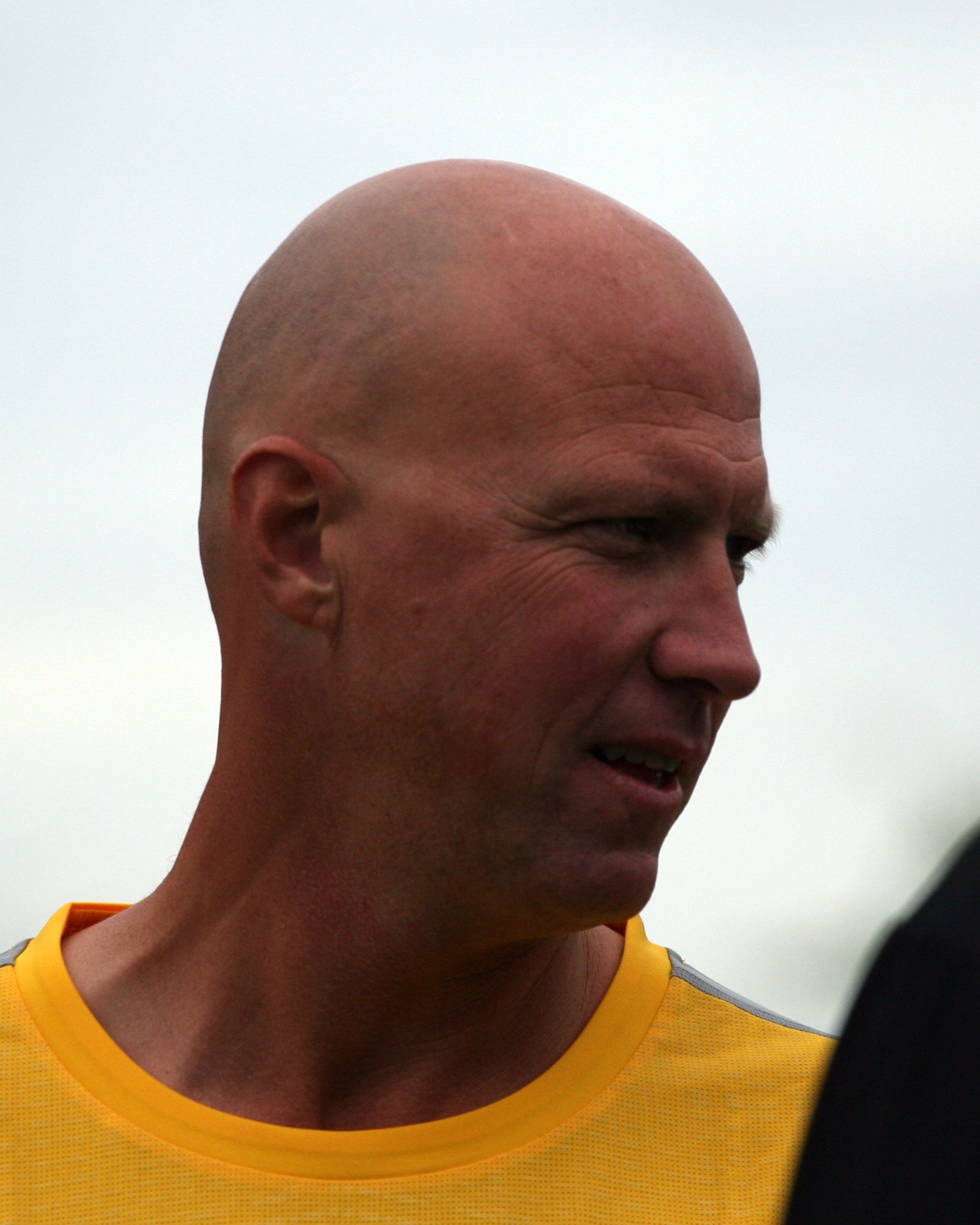
- Jensen in 2009
- Country (sports): United States
- Residence: Atlanta, Georgia, U.S.
- Born: June 18, 1966 (age 60) Grayling, Michigan, U.S.
- Height: 6 ft 3 in (1.91 m)
- Turned pro: 1987
- Plays: Ambidextrous (one-handed backhand)
- Prize money: $1,313,255

Singles
- Career record: 12–43
- Career titles: 0
- Highest ranking: No. 168 (July 25, 1988)

Grand Slam singles results
- Australian Open: 1R (1995)
- US Open: 2R (1985, 1986)

Doubles
- Career record: 252–297
- Career titles: 10
- Highest ranking: No. 6 (November 1, 1993)

Grand Slam doubles results
- Australian Open: 3R (1992)
- French Open: W (1993)
- Wimbledon: 3R (1992)
- US Open: QF (1989)

Grand Slam mixed doubles results
- Australian Open: F (1996)
- French Open: F (1996)
- Wimbledon: QF (1992, 1996)
- US Open: SF (1995, 1997)
Medal record
Representing United States
Tennis
Pan American Games
Gold medal – first place	1987 Indianapolis	Men's doubles
Bronze medal – third place	1987 Indianapolis	Men's singles

Luke Jensen (born June 18, 1966) is an American former professional tennis player and Grand Slam doubles champion. Jensen won the 1993 French Open Doubles title with his younger brother Murphy Jensen.

He attended the University of Southern California from 1986 to 1987 and earned singles All-American honors both years (doubles in 1987). He began working for ESPN as a tennis analyst in 1994. Jensen compiled a 106–57 record in seven and a half seasons as the head coach of the Syracuse Orange women's tennis team. Jensen worked with his brother as the touring pro, tennis director and tennis pro emeritus at the Sea Island Resort until 2016.

== Tennis career ==
Jensen attended East Grand Rapids High School, winning the Michigan state singles championship in 1983, and graduating in 1985.

=== Juniors ===
As a junior Jensen reached the No. 1 junior world ranking in both singles and doubles in 1984.

=== Pro tour ===
Jensen turned professional in 1987. Jensen gained the nickname of "Dual Hand Luke" because he was an ambidextrous player able to serve at 130 mph with either hand. He now does on-court analysis for ESPN for their tennis coverage. He also travels the world as an instructor, motivational speaker, and ambassador for the game.

He reached his career-high doubles ranking of world No. 6 in November 1993. In that year, he won the men's doubles title at the French Open playing with his younger brother, Murphy Jensen. Jensen's career-high singles ranking was world No. 168, achieved in July 1988.

== Career doubles finals ==
=== 10 titles ===
Legend Grand Slam (1) ATP Masters Series (1) ATP Championship Series (1) ATP Tour (7)	Titles by surface Hard (5) Clay (4) Grass (1) Carpet (0)

No.	Date	Tournament	Surface	Partner	Opponents	Score
1.	Feb 1988	Guarujá, Brazil	Hard	(Chile) Ricardo Acuña	(Argentina) Javier Frana (Uruguay) Diego Pérez	6–1, 6–4
2.	Nov 1989	Johannesburg, South Africa	Hard (i)	(United States) Richey Reneberg	(United States) Kelly Jones (United States) Joey Rive	6–0, 6–4
3.	Apr 1991	Orlando, U.S.	Hard	(United States) Scott Melville	(Venezuela) Nicolás Pereira (United States) Pete Sampras	6–7, 7–6, 6–3
4.	Apr 1991	Monte Carlo, Monaco	Clay	(Australia) Laurie Warder	(Netherlands) Paul Haarhuis (Netherlands) Mark Koevermans	5–7, 7–6, 6–4
5.	May 1991	Bologna, Italy	Clay	(Australia) Laurie Warder	(Brazil) Luiz Mattar (Brazil) Jaime Oncins	6–4, 7–6
6.	May 1992	Bologna, Italy	Clay	(Australia) Laurie Warder	(Argentina) Javier Frana (Spain) Javier Sánchez	6–2, 6–3
7.	Jun 1993	French Open, Paris	Clay	(United States) Murphy Jensen	(Germany) Marc-Kevin Goellner (Germany) David Prinosil	6–4, 6–7, 6–4
8.	Jun 1995	Nottingham, England	Grass	(United States) Murphy Jensen	(United States) Patrick Galbraith (South Africa) Danie Visser	6–3, 5–7, 6–4
9.	Aug 1996	Long Island, U.S.	Hard	(United States) Murphy Jensen	(Germany) Hendrik Dreekmann (Russia) Alexander Volkov	6–3, 7–6
10.	Jul 1997	Washington, D.C., U.S.	Hard	(United States) Murphy Jensen	(South Africa) Neville Godwin (Netherlands) Fernon Wibier	6–4, 6–4

=== 14 runner-ups ===
No.	Date	Tournament	Surface	Partner	Opponents	Score
1.	May 1991	Rome, Italy	Clay	(Australia) Laurie Warder	(Italy) Omar Camporese (Croatia) Goran Ivanišević	2–6, 3–6
2.	Oct 1991	Sydney Indoor, Australia	Hard (i)	(Australia) Laurie Warder	(United States) Jim Grabb (United States) Richey Reneberg	4–6, 4–6
3.	Apr 1992	Estoril, Portugal	Clay	(Australia) Laurie Warder	(Netherlands) Hendrik Jan Davids (Belgium) Libor Pimek	6–3, 3–6, 5–7
4.	Jan 1993	Sydney Outdoor, Australia	Hard	(United States) Murphy Jensen	(Australia) Sandon Stolle (Australia) Jason Stoltenberg	3–6, 4–6
5.	Mar 1993	Scottsdale, U.S.	Hard	(Australia) Sandon Stolle	(United States) Mark Keil (United States) Dave Randall	5–7, 4–6
6.	Mar 1993	Indian Wells, U.S.	Hard	(United States) Scott Melville	(France) Guy Forget (France) Henri Leconte	4–6, 5–7
7.	May 1993	Madrid, Spain	Clay	(United States) Scott Melville	(Spain) Tomás Carbonell (Spain) Carlos Costa	6–7, 2–6
8.	May 1993	Bologna, Italy	Clay	(United States) Murphy Jensen	(South Africa) Danie Visser (Australia) Laurie Warder	6–4, 4–6, 4–6
9.	Oct 1993	Tokyo Indoor, Japan	Carpet (i)	(United States) Murphy Jensen	(Canada) Grant Connell (United States) Patrick Galbraith	3–6, 4–6
10.	Feb 1994	Mexico City, Mexico	Clay	(United States) Murphy Jensen	(United States) Francisco Montana (United States) Bryan Shelton	3–6, 4–6
11.	Sep 1994	Bogotá, Colombia	Clay	(United States) Murphy Jensen	(The Bahamas) Mark Knowles (Canada) Daniel Nestor	4–6, 6–7
12.	Apr 1995	Nice, France	Clay	(United States) David Wheaton	(Czech Republic) Cyril Suk (Czech Republic) Daniel Vacek	6–3, 6–7, 6–7
13.	May 1997	Coral Springs, U.S.	Clay	(United States) Murphy Jensen	(United States) Dave Randall (United States) Greg Van Emburgh	7–6, 2–6, 6–7
14.	May 1997	St. Poelten, Austria	Clay	(United States) Murphy Jensen	(United States) Kelly Jones (United States) Scott Melville	2–6, 6–7
