= 2016 Delray Beach International Tennis Championships =

Tennis tournament

- Date: 15–21 February
- Edition: 24th
- Category: World Tour 250
- Draw: 32S / 16D
- Prize money: $514,065
- Surface: Hard / outdoor
- Location: Delray Beach, United States

Champions

Singles
- (United States) Sam Querrey

Doubles
- (Austria) Oliver Marach / (France) Fabrice Martin
← 2015 ·	Delray Beach Open	· 2017 →

The 2016 Delray Beach International Tennis Championships was a professional men's tennis tournament played on hard courts. It was the 24th edition of the tournament, and was part of the World Tour 250 series of the 2016 ATP World Tour. It took place in Delray Beach, United States between 15 February and 21 February 2016. Unseeded Sam Querrey won the singles title.

== Finals ==
=== Singles ===
- (United States) Sam Querrey defeated (United States) Rajeev Ram 6–4, 7–6^{(8–6)}

=== Doubles ===
- (Austria) Oliver Marach / (France) Fabrice Martin defeated (United States) Bob Bryan / (United States) Mike Bryan 3–6, 7–6^{(9–7)}, [13–11]

== Singles main-draw entrants ==
=== Seeds ===
Country	Player	Rank^{1}	Seed
RSA	Kevin Anderson	14	1
AUS	Bernard Tomic	20	2
CRO	Ivo Karlović	26	3
BUL	Grigor Dimitrov	27	4
FRA	Jérémy Chardy	28	5
USA	Steve Johnson	29	6
USA	Donald Young	48	7
FRA	Adrian Mannarino	49	8

- ^{1} Rankings as of February 8, 2016

=== Other entrants ===
The following players received wildcards into the main draw:

- (Argentina) Juan Martín del Potro
- (United States) Noah Rubin
- (United States) Tim Smyczek

The following player received entry as a special exempt:

- (United States) Taylor Fritz

The following players received entry from the qualifying draw:

- (Moldova) Radu Albot
- (Japan) Tatsuma Ito
- (United States) Dennis Novikov
- (Australia) John-Patrick Smith

=== Withdrawals ===
Before the tournament

- (Chinese Taipei) Lu Yen-hsun →replaced by (Tunisia) Malek Jaziri
- (Canada) Milos Raonic (right adductor injury) →replaced by (United States) Austin Krajicek

=== Retirements ===
- (South Africa) Kevin Anderson (shoulder injury)
- (Kazakhstan) Mikhail Kukushkin (leg injury)

== Doubles main-draw entrants ==
=== Seeds ===
Country	Player	Country	Player	Rank^{1}	Seed
USA	Bob Bryan	USA	Mike Bryan	11	1
RSA	Raven Klaasen	USA	Rajeev Ram	53	2
PHI	Treat Huey	BLR	Max Mirnyi	65	3
USA	Eric Butorac	USA	Scott Lipsky	84	4

- ^{1} Rankings are as of February 8, 2016.

=== Other entrants ===
The following pairs received wildcards into the main draw:

- (Germany) Benjamin Becker / (Germany) Frank Moser
- (United States) Bjorn Fratangelo / (United States) Dennis Novikov

The following pair received entry as alternates:

- (Netherlands) Sander Groen / (Italy) Adelchi Virgili

=== Withdrawals ===
Before the tournament

- (United States) Steve Johnson (shoulder injury)

During the tournament

- (Kazakhstan) Mikhail Kukushkin (leg injury)
