= Junior Tennis Champions Center =

Tennis training center in College Park, Maryland, US

Coordinates: 38.97713°N 76.92217°W

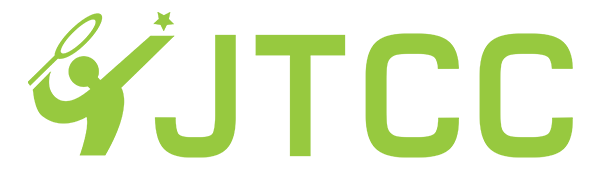
- Type: 501(c)(3) nonprofit
- Founded: 1999
- Headquarters: College Park, Maryland
- Key people: Martin Blackman (CEO)
- Website: www.jtcc.org

The Junior Tennis Champions Center (JTCC) is a tennis training center and preparatory school in College Park, Maryland. Founded in 1999, JTCC trains junior, collegiate and professional tennis players.

The center hosts United States Tennis Association (USTA) and International Tennis Federation (ITF) Junior World Tour events, and serves as the training center for the University of Maryland's women's tennis team.

The center has 17 outdoor courts and 15 indoor courts, including hardcourts, Har-Tru courts, and red clay courts.

== History ==
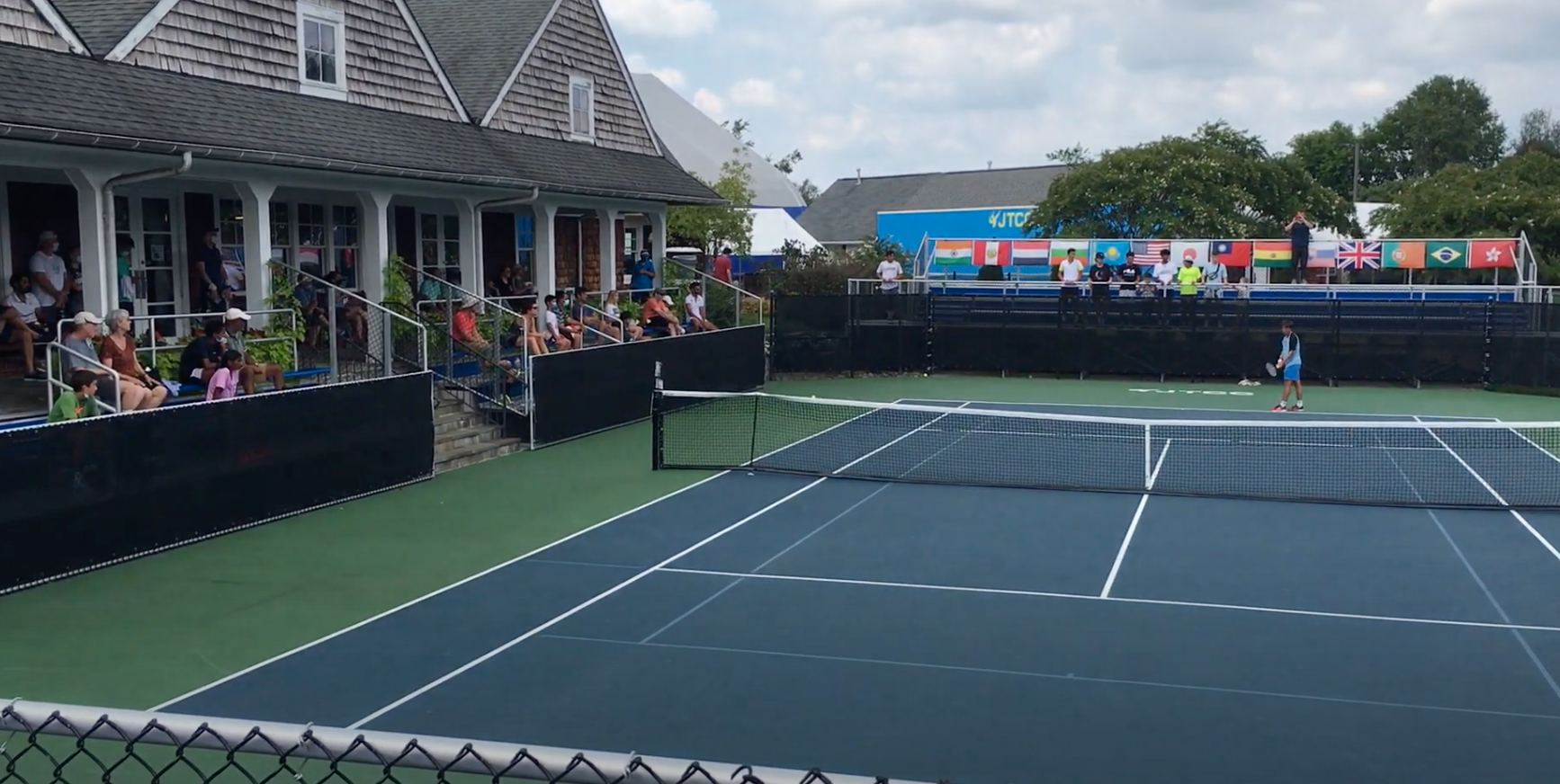
The center court at JTCC

JTCC was founded in 1999 by investment banker Ken Brody. The school was incorporated as a 501(c)(3) nonprofit organization meant to serve Washington, D.C., and its Maryland suburbs of Montgomery County and Prince George’s County. Rather than recruiting players from around the country and world, like some tennis academies, the center aims to discover and harvest the best tennis talent from the Washington metropolitan area, JTCC officials said in 2014.

JTCC began operating with 40 recruited junior tennis players from the Mid-Atlantic region.

From 1999 to 2010, future World No. 10 Frances Tiafoe often stayed at the center five nights a week, sleeping in a back room with his brother and his father, the center's head of maintenance. Tiafoe attended school and was coached by the staff at the center.

By 2004, JTCC had demonstrated enough success in junior tennis to earn a designation as a USTA Regional Training Center.

JTCC reached a multi-year agreement with Fila in 2013. As a result of this agreement, Fila has a shop at JTCC and top JTCC players are provided with Fila apparel for junior tournaments.

In 2013 and 2018, JTCC received the USTA's USA Developmental Program of the Year Award for training youth tennis players.

In 2024, JTCC was named National Junior Tennis and Learning (NJTL) chapter of the year by the USTA Foundation for its work with under-served youth.

=== Tournaments held ===
The center has hosted various USTA regional tournaments. It hosts the Wayne K. Curry Prince George’s County International Junior Tennis Championships, an ITF Junior World Tour Grade 1 event. The tournament has drawn numerous future professional tennis players including Daniil Medvedev, Stefanos Tsitsipas, Denis Shapovalov, Reilly Opelka, Felix Auger-Aliassime, Frances Tiafoe, Casper Ruud, Tommy Paul, Sebastian Korda, Coco Gauff, Sofia Kenin and Claire Liu.

JTCC also hosts the ITA Bedford Cup Mid-Atlantic Championships, which is an NCAA Division I women's tennis tournament that draws teams from around the country. Participating schools have included the University of Maryland, University of Delaware, Georgetown University, James Madison University and George Washington University.

== Programs ==
=== Community outreach ===
Since 2009, JTCC has run the GEICO Game On! program, which brings JTCC coaches to inner-city schools and recreation centers to teach at-risk children how to play tennis.

=== High Performance program ===
The High Performance program has four components: Full Time, Champs I, Champs II, and Junior Champs. Each group has players between ages 6 and 18, and trains for collegiate recruitment.

=== School ===
JTCC uses the Laurel Springs School as its distance schooling program. Players in the Full Time High Performance program usually are enrolled in the program to help maximize training time. The school claims that "every student who has graduated from JTCC’s Champions program has earned a scholarship to a Division I program or a facilitated acceptance at a Division III or Ivy League college or university and/or have pursued careers in professional tennis." There are two teachers that teach in-person and full-time at JTCC.

The program's graduates have gone on to attend all the Ivy League colleges, Stanford, Chicago, Virginia, UCLA, Illinois, North Carolina, Maryland, Penn State, Michigan, Texas, Georgia Tech, Carnegie Mellon, Emory, Rice, Duke, Georgetown, George Washington, Notre Dame, Wake Forest and many other colleges and universities.

== Notable alumni ==
JTCC has trained numerous NCAA college tennis players, including NCAA Division I, II, and III champions and All-American players.

The center has also trained professional tennis players during professional events, including the US Open Series' Washington Open, the ATP 500, and WTA International tournament at the nearby William H.G. FitzGerald Tennis Center.

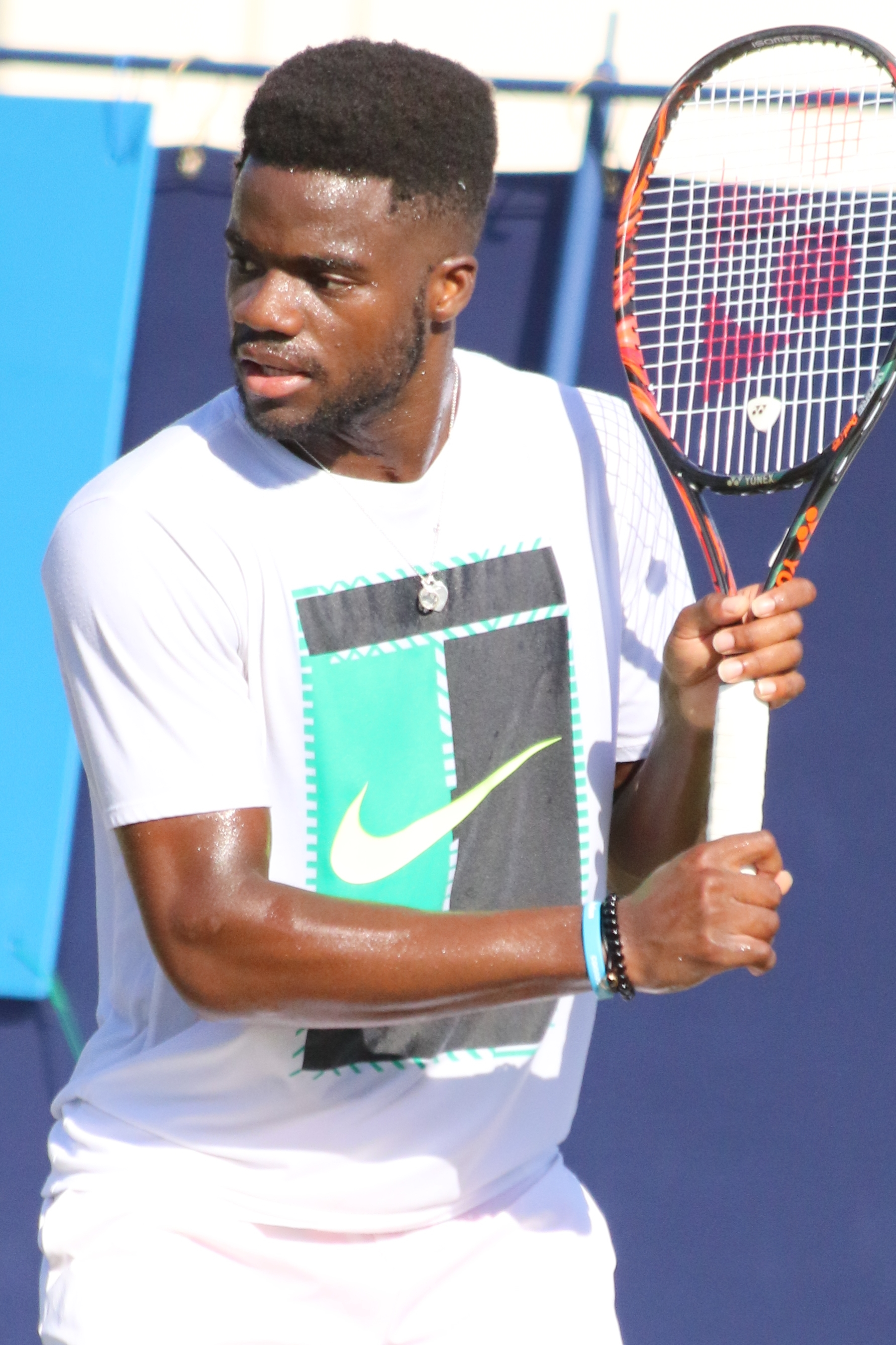
Frances Tiafoe trained at JTCC since he was 4 years old

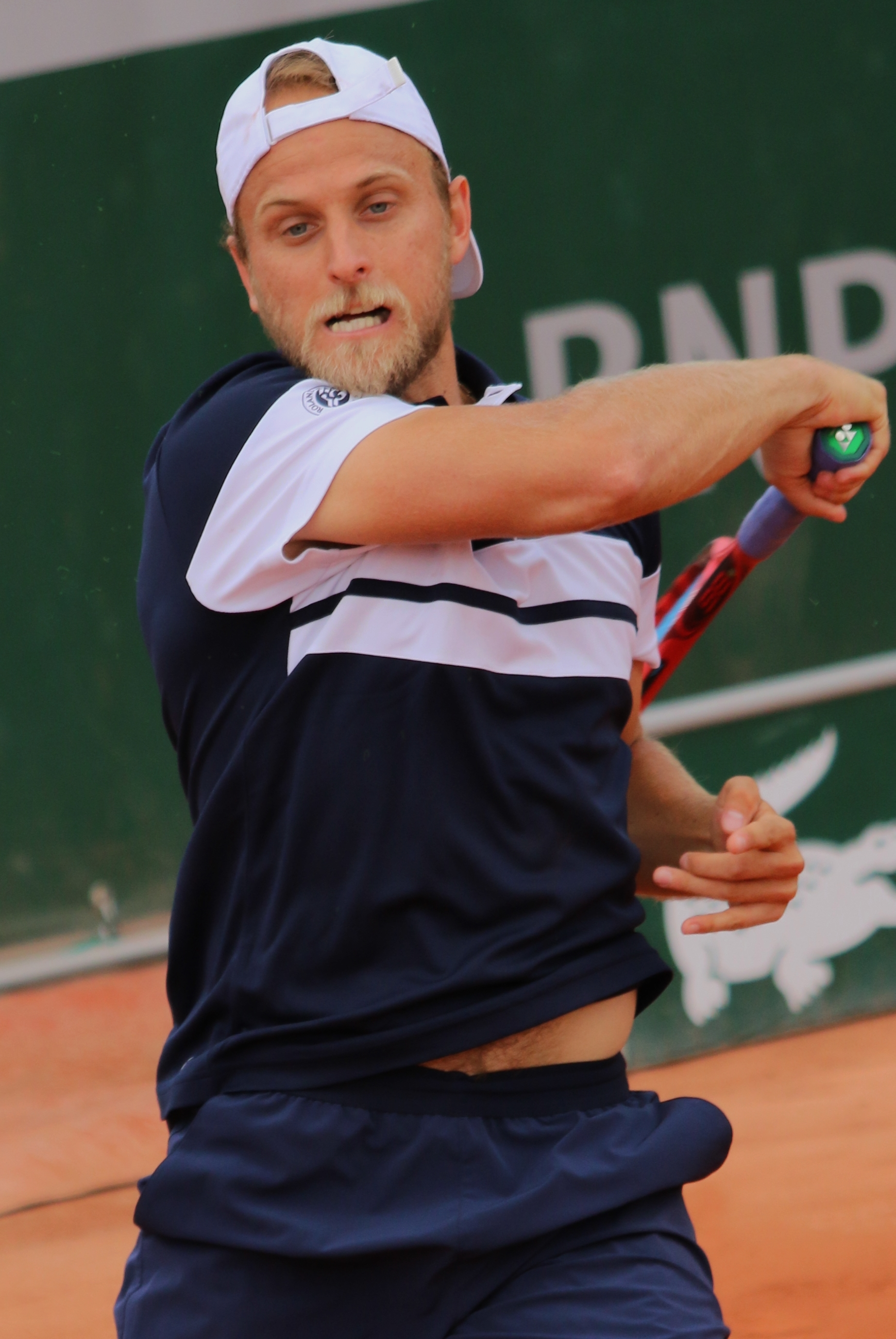
Denis Kudla trained at JTCC since age 10.

- Usue Arconada: Reached #130 in the WTA rankings, 2016 Wimbledon Girls’ Doubles Champion
- Beatrice Capra: Reached WTA #201
- Tamara Culibrk: WTA player
- Andrew Fenty: ATP player, tennis player at the University of Michigan, reached #2 in NCAA doubles rankings, reached #14 in NCAA singles rankings, 2020 Big Ten Player of the Year
- Treat Huey: Reached #18 in the ATP doubles rankings
- Tara Iyer: Reached #304 in the WTA singles rankings
- Frances Tiafoe: Reached ATP #10, 2022 US Open Singles semifinalist, 2019 Australian Open Singles quarter-finalist, 2018 Delray Beach Open Singles Champion, 2013 Orange Bowl Champion
- Denis Kudla: Reached ATP #53
- Robin Montgomery: Reached WTA #143, 2021 US Open Girls’ Singles and Doubles Champion, 2019 Orange Bowl Singles Champion
- Cameron Morra: Reached WTA #868
- Skylar Morton: Reached WTA #1,198
- Alexa Noel: Reached WTA #679, 2024 NCAA singles champion
- Olga Puchkova: Reached WTA #32
- Alison Riske-Amritraj: Reached WTA #18
- Phillip Simmonds: Reached ATP #219
- Michael Shabaz: Reached ATP #394
- Hailey Baptiste: Reached WTA #25, 4-time ITF title Champion and WTA Doubles finalist
- Evan Zhu: Reached ATP #495
- Vera Zvonareva: Reached WTA #2, 2010 Wimbledon Singles finalist, 2010 US Open Singles finalist and 2008 Olympics Bronze medalist

== Notable staff ==
- Martin Blackman, retired ATP player and former Director of JTCC, reached #158 in ATP singles rankings
- Brian Gottfried, retired ATP player and senior advisor to JTCC, reached #3 in the ATP singles rankings, finalist at the 1977 French Open and #2 in the ATP doubles rankings
- Claudio Pistolesi, retired ATP player and senior advisor to JTCC, reached #71 in the ATP singles rankings
- Richey Reneberg, retired ATP player and co-founder of JTCC, reached #20 in the ATP singles rankings and #1 in the ATP doubles rankings
- Megan Moulton-Levy, retired WTA player and General Manager of Player Development at JTCC, reached #237 in the WTA singles rankings and #50 in the WTA doubles rankings
