= 2019 Delray Beach Open – Singles =

Singles
- 2019 Delray Beach Open

Final
- Champion: (Moldova) Radu Albot
- Runner-up: (United Kingdom) Dan Evans
- Score: 3–6, 6–3, 7–6^{(9–7)}

Details
- Draw: 32 (4 Q / 3 WC )
- Seeds: 8

Events
Singles	Doubles
- Delray Beach Open

Frances Tiafoe was the defending champion, but lost in the first round to Dan Evans.

Evans, a qualifier, eventually reached the final but lost to Radu Albot, 6–3, 3–6, 6–7^{(7–9)}, double-faulting on championship point after squandering three championship points of his own in the tiebreaker. Albot became the first player from Moldova to win on the ATP Tour.

== Seeds ==
1. (Argentina) Juan Martín del Potro (quarterfinals)
2. (United States) John Isner (semifinals)
3. (United States) Frances Tiafoe (first round)
4. (United States) Steve Johnson (quarterfinals)
5. (Australia) John Millman (first round)
6. (Italy) Andreas Seppi (quarterfinals)
7. (United States) Taylor Fritz (first round)
8. (France) Adrian Mannarino (quarterfinals)

== Draw ==
Key

- Q = Qualifier
- WC = Wild card
- LL = Lucky loser
- Alt = Alternate
- ITF = ITF entry
- PR = Protected ranking
- SR = Special ranking
- SE = Special exempt
- JE = Junior exempt
- JR = Junior Accelerator Programme entrant
- CO = College Accelerator Programme entrant
- NG = Next Gen Accelerator Program entrant
- w/o = Walkover
- r = Retired
- d = Defaulted

=== Finals ===
Semifinals
(United States) Mackenzie McDonald	6	0	0
(Moldova) Radu Albot	3	6	6
Q	(United Kingdom) Dan Evans	3	6	6
2/WC	(United States) John Isner	6	2	3

Final
(Moldova) Radu Albot	3	6	7^{9}
Q	(United Kingdom) Dan Evans	6	3	6^{7}

=== Top half ===
First round
1/WC	(Argentina) JM del Potro	6	7
(Japan) Y Nishioka	3	5
(United States) T Sandgren	4	0
(United States) R Opelka	6	6
(Spain) G García López	2	6	6
(United States) J Donaldson	6	3	3
(United States) M McDonald	3	6	6
7	(United States) T Fritz	6	4	3
4	(United States) S Johnson	7^{7}	6
Alt	(Chinese Taipei) J Jung	6^{3}	4
Q	(United States) T Smyczek	5	3
(Italy) P Lorenzi	7	6
(Moldova) R Albot	7^{7}	6
(Croatia) I Karlović	6^{2}	4
(Australia) N Kyrgios	6	6^{1}	7^{7}
5	(Australia) J Millman	4	7^{7}	6^{3}

Second round
1/WC	(Argentina) JM del Potro	6	6
(United States) R Opelka	4	4
(Spain) G García López	5	4
(United States) M McDonald	7	6
4	(United States) S Johnson	7	7
(Italy) P Lorenzi	5	5
(Moldova) R Albot	6	3	6
(Australia) N Kyrgios	2	6	3

Quarterfinals
1/WC	(Argentina) JM del Potro	4	6	6^{5}
(United States) M McDonald	6	3	7^{7}
4	(United States) S Johnson	6	3	6^{5}
(Moldova) R Albot	1	6	7^{7}

Semifinals
(United States) M McDonald	6	0	0
(Moldova) R Albot	3	6	6

=== Bottom half ===
First round
6	(Italy) A Seppi	6	7
(Australia) B Tomic	4	5
(Australia) J Thompson	7	6
(Spain) M Granollers	5	1
WC	(South Africa) L Harris	7^{7}	6
Q	(Barbados) D King	6^{1}	3
Q	(United Kingdom) D Evans	3	7^{7}	7
3	(United States) F Tiafoe	6	6^{1}	5
8	(France) A Mannarino	6	6
SE	(Canada) B Schnur	2	2
(Uzbekistan) D Istomin	7^{7}	6
(Spain) F López	6^{5}	2
(Slovakia) L Lacko	6	6
Q	(Japan) Y Watanuki	4	4
(Canada) P Polansky	3	6^{4}
2/WC	(United States) J Isner	6	7^{7}

Second round
6	(Italy) A Seppi	6	4	6
(Australia) J Thompson	3	6	1
WC	(South Africa) L Harris	0	2
Q	(United Kingdom) D Evans	6	6
8	(France) A Mannarino	6	7^{7}
(Uzbekistan) D Istomin	2	6^{3}
(Slovakia) L Lacko	4	3
2/WC	(United States) J Isner	6	6

Quarterfinals
6	(Italy) A Seppi	4	4
Q	(United Kingdom) D Evans	6	6
8	(France) A Mannarino	6^{2}	4
2/WC	(United States) J Isner	7^{7}	6

Semifinals
Q	(United Kingdom) D Evans	3	6	6
2/WC	(United States) J Isner	6	2	3

== Qualifying ==
=== Seeds ===
1. (United States) Bjorn Fratangelo (first round)
2. (Spain) Adrián Menéndez Maceiras (qualifying competition)
3. (Australia) Alexei Popyrin (qualifying competition)
4. (Australia) Alex Bolt (first round)
5. (India) Ramkumar Ramanathan (first round)
6. (United Kingdom) Dan Evans (qualified)
7. (Barbados) Darian King (qualified)
8. (Japan) Yasutaka Uchiyama (first round)

=== Qualifiers ===
1. (United Kingdom) Dan Evans
2. (United States) Tim Smyczek
3. (Barbados) Darian King
4. (Japan) Yosuke Watanuki

=== Qualifying draw ===
==== First qualifier ====
First round
1	(United States) Bjorn Fratangelo	2	6^{2}
Alt	(United States) Donald Young	6	7^{7}
(Germany) Dominik Köpfer	6	3	4
6	(United Kingdom) Dan Evans	3	6	6

Qualifying competition
Alt	(United States) Donald Young	2	6^{3}
6	(United Kingdom) Dan Evans	6	7^{7}

==== Second qualifier ====
First round
2	(Spain) Adrián Menéndez Maceiras	6	5	6
(Italy) Andrea Arnaboldi	4	7	4
(United States) Tim Smyczek	6	6
8	(Japan) Yasutaka Uchiyama	4	2

Qualifying competition
2	(Spain) Adrián Menéndez Maceiras	3	4
(United States) Tim Smyczek	6	6

==== Third qualifier ====
First round
3	(Australia) Alexei Popyrin	6	6
WC	(United States) Preston Brown	4	3
Alt	(Australia) John-Patrick Smith	4	6^{3}
7	(Barbados) Darian King	6	7^{7}

Qualifying competition
3	(Australia) Alexei Popyrin	6^{3}	3
7	(Barbados) Darian King	7^{7}	6

==== Fourth qualifier ====
First round
4	(Australia) Alex Bolt	1	1
(Japan) Yosuke Watanuki	6	6
WC	(El Salvador) Marcelo Arévalo	6	3	7^{7}
5	(India) Ramkumar Ramanathan	2	6	6^{1}

Qualifying competition
(Japan) Yosuke Watanuki	6	6
WC	(El Salvador) Marcelo Arévalo	4	4
