= 2018 Delray Beach Open – Doubles =

Doubles
- 2018 Delray Beach Open

Final
- Champions: (United States) Jack Sock (United States) Jackson Withrow
- Runners-up: (United States) Nicholas Monroe (Australia) John-Patrick Smith
- Score: 4–6, 6–4, [10–8]

Events
| Singles | Doubles |
| ← 2017 · | Delray Beach Open | · 2019 → |

Raven Klaasen and Rajeev Ram were the defending champions, but Ram chose not to participate and Klaasen chose to compete in Marseille instead.

Jack Sock and Jackson Withrow won the title, defeating Nicholas Monroe and John-Patrick Smith in the final, 4–6, 6–4, [10–8].

== Seeds ==
1. (United States) Bob Bryan / (United States) Mike Bryan (quarterfinals)
2. (Belarus) Max Mirnyi / (Austria) Philipp Oswald (first round)
3. (Japan) Ben McLachlan / (France) Hugo Nys (semifinals)
4. (United States) Nicholas Monroe / (Australia) John-Patrick Smith (final)

== Draw ==
=== Key ===
- Q = Qualifier
- WC = Wild card
- LL = Lucky loser
- Alt = Alternate
- SE = Special exempt
- PR = Protected ranking
- ITF = ITF entry
- JE = Junior exempt
- w/o = Walkover
- r = Retired
- d = Defaulted
- SR = Special ranking

=== Draw ===
First round
1 | (United States) B Bryan (United States) M Bryan | 7 | 6
WC | (United States) T Fritz (United States) S Kozlov | 5 | 0
(United States) J Sock (United States) J Withrow | 6 | 6
(India) L Paes (India) P Raja | 3 | 2
3 | (Japan) B McLachlan (France) H Nys | 7^{7} | 7^{7}
(Philippines) T Huey (United States) S Johnson | 6^{3} | 6^{5}
(Netherlands) W Koolhof (New Zealand) A Sitak | 6^{3} | 2
(United States) S Lipsky (India) D Sharan | 7^{7} | 6
Alt | (Barbados) D King (United States) A Reed | 2 | 2
(Moldova) R Albot (Georgia (country)) N Basilashvili | 6 | 6
(France) J Chardy (France) F Martin | 6 | 1 | [4]
4 | (United States) N Monroe (Australia) J-P Smith | 3 | 6 | [10]
WC | (Canada) P Polansky (Canada) D Shapovalov | 4 | 6 | [10]
(Sweden) R Lindstedt (Croatia) F Škugor | 6 | 3 | [2]
(Australia) M Ebden (United States) D Young | 3 | 7^{7} | [10]
2 | (Belarus) M Mirnyi (Austria) P Oswald | 6 | 6^{1} | [5]

Quarterfinals
1 | (United States) B Bryan (United States) M Bryan | 6 | 3 | [5]
(United States) J Sock (United States) J Withrow | 3 | 6 | [10]
3 | (Japan) B McLachlan (France) H Nys | 3 | 6 | [10]
(United States) S Lipsky (India) D Sharan | 6 | 3 | [5]
(Moldova) R Albot (Georgia (country)) N Basilashvili | 5 | 1
4 | (United States) N Monroe (Australia) J-P Smith | 7 | 6
WC | (Canada) P Polansky (Canada) D Shapovalov | 3 | 7 | [3]
(Australia) M Ebden (United States) D Young | 6 | 5 | [10]

Semifinals
(United States) J Sock (United States) J Withrow | 6^{3} | 7^{7} | [10]
3 | (Japan) B McLachlan (France) H Nys | 7^{7} | 6^{4} | [4]
4 | (United States) N Monroe (Australia) J-P Smith | 7^{7} | 2 | [10]
(Australia) M Ebden (United States) D Young | 6^{4} | 6 | [7]

Final
(United States) J Sock (United States) J Withrow | 4 | 6 | [10]
4 | (United States) N Monroe (Australia) J-P Smith | 6 | 4 | [8]
