= 2018 Delray Beach Open =

- Date: February 19–25
- Edition: 26th
- Category: World Tour 250
- Draw: 32S / 16D
- Prize money: $556,010
- Surface: Hard / outdoor
- Location: Delray Beach, United States

Champions

Singles
- (United States) Frances Tiafoe

Doubles
- (United States) Jack Sock / (United States) Jackson Withrow
← 2017 ·	Delray Beach Open	· 2019 →

The 2018 Delray Beach Open was a professional tennis tournament played on hard courts. It was the 26th edition of the tournament, and part of the World Tour 250 category of the 2018 ATP World Tour. It took place in Delray Beach, United States between February 19 and February 25, 2018. Unseeded Frances Tiafoe, who entered the draw on a wildcard, won the singles title.

== Finals ==
=== Singles ===
- (United States) Frances Tiafoe defeated (Germany) Peter Gojowczyk, 6–1, 6–4

=== Doubles ===
- (United States) Jack Sock / (United States) Jackson Withrow defeated (United States) Nicholas Monroe / (Australia) John-Patrick Smith, 4–6, 6–4, [10–8]

== Singles main-draw entrants ==
=== Seeds ===
Country	Player	Rank^{1}	Seed
USA	Jack Sock	8	1
ARG	Juan Martín del Potro	9	2
~~RSA~~	~~Kevin Anderson~~	~~11~~	~~3~~
USA	Sam Querrey	12	4
~~AUS~~	~~Nick Kyrgios~~	~~15~~	~~5~~
USA	John Isner	18	6
~~FRA~~	~~Adrian Mannarino~~	~~25~~	~~7~~
KOR	Chung Hyeon	30	8
CAN	Milos Raonic	31	9

- ^{1} Rankings as of February 12, 2018

=== Other entrants ===
The following players received wildcards into the main draw:

- (United States) John Isner
- (United States) Reilly Opelka
- (United States) Frances Tiafoe

The following players received entry from the qualifying draw:

- (Kazakhstan) Alexander Bublik
- (India) Ramkumar Ramanathan
- (Croatia) Franko Škugor
- (Australia) John-Patrick Smith

The following players received entry as lucky losers:

- (Barbados) Darian King
- (United Kingdom) Cameron Norrie
- (Canada) Peter Polansky

=== Withdrawals ===
Before the tournament

- (South Africa) Kevin Anderson → replaced by (Barbados) Darian King
- (Australia) Nick Kyrgios → replaced by (United Kingdom) Cameron Norrie
- (France) Adrian Mannarino → replaced by (Canada) Peter Polansky

== Doubles main-draw entrants ==
=== Seeds ===
Country	Player	Country	Player	Rank^{1}	Seed
USA	Bob Bryan	USA	Mike Bryan	30	1
BLR	Max Mirnyi	AUT	Philipp Oswald	92	2
JPN	Ben McLachlan	FRA	Hugo Nys	96	3
USA	Nicholas Monroe	AUS	John-Patrick Smith	100	4

- ^{1} Rankings are as of February 12, 2018.

=== Other entrants ===
The following pairs received wildcards into the main draw:

- (United States) Taylor Fritz / (United States) Stefan Kozlov
- (Canada) Peter Polansky / (Canada) Denis Shapovalov

The following pair received entry as alternates:

- (Barbados) Darian King / (United States) Anderson Reed

=== Withdrawals ===
Before the tournament

- (United States) Sam Querrey
