= 2016 Delray Beach International Tennis Championships – Doubles =

Doubles
- 2016 Delray Beach International Tennis Championships

Final
- Champions: (Austria) Oliver Marach (France) Fabrice Martin
- Runners-up: (United States) Bob Bryan (United States) Mike Bryan
- Score: 3–6, 7–6^{(9–7)}, [13–11]

Events
Singles	Doubles
← 2015 ·	Delray Beach Open	· 2017 →

Bob and Mike Bryan were the two-time defending champions, but lost in the final to Oliver Marach and Fabrice Martin, 6–3, 6–7^{(7–9)}, [11–13].

== Seeds ==
1. (United States) Bob Bryan / (United States) Mike Bryan (final)
2. (South Africa) Raven Klaasen / (United States) Rajeev Ram (first round)
3. (Philippines) Treat Huey / (Belarus) Max Mirnyi (semifinals)
4. (United States) Eric Butorac / (United States) Scott Lipsky (first round)

== Draw ==
=== Key ===
- Q = Qualifier
- WC = Wild card
- LL = Lucky loser
- Alt = Alternate
- SE = Special exempt
- PR = Protected ranking
- ITF = ITF entry
- JE = Junior exempt
- w/o = Walkover
- r = Retired
- d = Defaulted
- SR = Special ranking

=== Draw ===
First round
1	(United States) B Bryan (United States) M Bryan	6	6
(Australia) J Millman (Australia) J-P Smith	3	4
WC	(United States) B Fratangelo (United States) D Novikov	6	4	[6]
(Kazakhstan) M Kukushkin (Ukraine) I Marchenko	1	6	[10]
4	(United States) E Butorac (United States) S Lipsky	4	5
(France) J Chardy (India) L Paes	6	7
WC	(Germany) B Becker (Germany) F Moser	5	3
(Spain) M Granollers (Australia) S Groth	7	6
(Australia) C Guccione (Australia) B Tomic	4	6	[10]
Alt	(Netherlands) S Groen (Italy) A Virgili	6	3	[8]
(Poland) M Fyrstenberg (Mexico) S González	3	6^{5}
3	(Philippines) T Huey (Belarus) M Mirnyi	6	7^{7}
(Lithuania) R Berankis (France) A Mannarino	4	2
(Austria) O Marach (France) F Martin	6	6
(United States) D Kudla (United States) D Young	6	7^{7}
2	(South Africa) R Klaasen (United States) R Ram	3	6^{4}

Quarterfinals
1	(United States) B Bryan (United States) M Bryan	w/o
(Kazakhstan) M Kukushkin (Ukraine) I Marchenko
(France) J Chardy (India) L Paes	6	4	[10]
(Spain) M Granollers (Australia) S Groth	3	6	[6]
(Australia) C Guccione (Australia) B Tomic	3	4
3	(Philippines) T Huey (Belarus) M Mirnyi	6	6
(Austria) O Marach (France) F Martin	6	6
(United States) D Kudla (United States) D Young	4	4

Semifinals
1	(United States) B Bryan (United States) M Bryan	6	6
(France) J Chardy (India) L Paes	2	3
3	(Philippines) T Huey (Belarus) M Mirnyi	6	1	[5]
(Austria) O Marach (France) F Martin	3	6	[10]

Final
1	(United States) B Bryan (United States) M Bryan	6	6^{7}	[11]
(Austria) O Marach (France) F Martin	3	7^{9}	[13]
