= 2019 Delray Beach Open – Doubles =

Doubles
- 2019 Delray Beach Open

Final
- Champions: (United States) Bob Bryan (United States) Mike Bryan
- Runners-up: (United Kingdom) Ken Skupski (United Kingdom) Neal Skupski
- Score: 7–6^{(7–5)}, 6–4

Events
Singles	Doubles
← 2018 ·	Delray Beach Open	· 2020 →

Jack Sock and Jackson Withrow were the defending champions, but Sock withdrew from the tournament due to injury. Withrow played alongside Nick Kyrgios, but lost in the quarterfinals to Radu Albot and Yoshihito Nishioka.

Bob and Mike Bryan won the title, defeating Ken and Neal Skupski in the final, 7–6^{(7–5)}, 6–4. It was the first all-brothers doubles final on the ATP Tour since June 1977, when Vijay Amritraj and Anand Amritraj beat John Lloyd and David Lloyd 6–1, 6–2 at The Queen's Club in London.

== Seeds ==
1. (United States) Bob Bryan / (United States) Mike Bryan (champions)
2. (United Kingdom) Ken Skupski / (United Kingdom) Neal Skupski (final)
3. (Sweden) Robert Lindstedt / (Germany) Tim Pütz (quarterfinals)
4. (Mexico) Santiago González / (Pakistan) Aisam-ul-Haq Qureshi (first round)

== Draw ==
=== Key ===
- Q = Qualifier
- WC = Wild card
- LL = Lucky loser
- Alt = Alternate
- SE = Special exempt
- PR = Protected ranking
- ITF = ITF entry
- JE = Junior exempt
- w/o = Walkover
- r = Retired
- d = Defaulted
- SR = Special ranking

=== Draw ===
First round
1	(United States) B Bryan (United States) M Bryan	7^{7}	7^{7}
(Germany) K Krawietz (Germany) A Mies	6^{5}	6^{3}
(France) A Mannarino (France) H Nys	6	6
(United States) S Johnson (United States) T Sandgren	1	2
3	(Sweden) R Lindstedt (Germany) T Pütz	6	7^{7}
WC	(Venezuela) R Maytín (United States) N Pasha	4	6^{3}
WC	(India) R Ramanathan (United States) T Smyczek	4	2
(El Salvador) M Arévalo (United States) J Cerretani	6	6
(Spain) M Granollers (Australia) B Tomic	5	4
(Moldova) R Albot (Japan) Y Nishioka	7	6
(Australia) N Kyrgios (United States) J Withrow	6	7
4	(Mexico) S González (Pakistan) A-u-H Qureshi	4	5
(Australia) J-P Smith (Australia) J Thompson	2	6	[6]
(Italy) P Lorenzi (Italy) A Seppi	6	3	[10]
(Australia) J Millman (Australia) A Popyrin	2	4
2	(United Kingdom) K Skupski (United Kingdom) N Skupski	6	6

Quarterfinals
1	(United States) B Bryan (United States) M Bryan	6	7
(France) A Mannarino (France) H Nys	3	5
3	(Sweden) R Lindstedt (Germany) T Pütz	6^{2}	6^{5}
(El Salvador) M Arévalo (United States) J Cerretani	7^{7}	7^{7}
(Moldova) R Albot (Japan) Y Nishioka	7^{7}	6
(Australia) N Kyrgios (United States) J Withrow	6^{2}	1
(Italy) P Lorenzi (Italy) A Seppi	6^{4}	4
2	(United Kingdom) K Skupski (United Kingdom) N Skupski	7^{7}	6

Semifinals
1	(United States) B Bryan (United States) M Bryan	6	7
(El Salvador) M Arévalo (United States) J Cerretani	3	5
(Moldova) R Albot (Japan) Y Nishioka	4	2
2	(United Kingdom) K Skupski (United Kingdom) N Skupski	6	6

Final
1	(United States) B Bryan (United States) M Bryan	7^{7}	6
2	(United Kingdom) K Skupski (United Kingdom) N Skupski	6^{5}	4
