= 2019 Delray Beach Open =

- Date: February 18–24
- Edition: 27th
- Category: ATP Tour 250
- Draw: 32S / 16D
- Prize money: $582,550
- Surface: Hard / outdoor
- Location: Delray Beach, Florida, United States
- Venue: Delray Beach Tennis Center

Champions

Singles
- (Moldova) Radu Albot

Doubles
- (United States) Bob Bryan / (United States) Mike Bryan
← 2018 ·	Delray Beach Open	· 2020 →

The 2019 Delray Beach Open was a professional men's tennis tournament played on hard courts. It was the 27th edition of the tournament, and part of the ATP Tour 250 category of the 2019 ATP Tour. It took place in Delray Beach, Florida, United States between February 18 and February 24, 2019. Unseeded Radu Albot won the singles title.

== Finals ==
=== Singles ===
- (Moldova) Radu Albot defeated (United Kingdom) Dan Evans 3–6, 6–3, 7–6^{(9–7)}

=== Doubles ===
- (United States) Bob Bryan / (United States) Mike Bryan defeated (United Kingdom) Ken Skupski / (United Kingdom) Neal Skupski, 7–6^{(7–5)}, 6–4

== Singles main-draw entrants ==
=== Seeds ===
Country	Player	Rank^{1}	Seed
ARG	Juan Martín del Potro	4	1
USA	John Isner	9	2
USA	Frances Tiafoe	29	3
USA	Steve Johnson	34	4
AUS	John Millman	37	5
ITA	Andreas Seppi	40	6
USA	Taylor Fritz	42	7
FRA	Adrian Mannarino	48	8

- ^{1} Rankings as of February 11, 2019

=== Other entrants ===
The following players received wildcards into the main draw:

- (Argentina) Juan Martín del Potro
- (South Africa) Lloyd Harris
- (United States) John Isner

The following player received entry as a special exempt:

- (Canada) Brayden Schnur

The following player received entry as an alternate:

- (Chinese Taipei) Jason Jung

The following players received entry from the qualifying draw:

- (United Kingdom) Dan Evans
- (Barbados) Darian King
- (United States) Tim Smyczek
- (Japan) Yosuke Watanuki

=== Withdrawals ===
Before the tournament

- (South Africa) Kevin Anderson → replaced by (Spain) Marcel Granollers
- (United States) Bradley Klahn → replaced by (Chinese Taipei) Jason Jung
- (United States) Michael Mmoh → replaced by (Slovakia) Lukáš Lacko
- (Canada) Milos Raonic → replaced by (United States) Jared Donaldson
- (United States) Jack Sock → replaced by (Italy) Paolo Lorenzi

== Doubles main-draw entrants ==
=== Seeds ===
Country	Player	Country	Player	Rank^{1}	Seed
USA	Bob Bryan	USA	Mike Bryan	17	1
GBR	Ken Skupski	GBR	Neal Skupski	101	2
SWE	Robert Lindstedt	GER	Tim Pütz	123	3
MEX	Santiago González	PAK	Aisam-ul-Haq Qureshi	124	4

- ^{1} Rankings are as of February 11, 2019.

=== Other entrants ===
The following pairs received wildcards into the main draw:

- (Venezuela) Roberto Maytín / (United States) Nathan Pasha
- (India) Ramkumar Ramanathan / (United States) Tim Smyczek
