= 2018 Delray Beach Open – Singles =

Singles
- 2018 Delray Beach Open

Final
- Champion: (United States) Frances Tiafoe
- Runner-up: (Germany) Peter Gojowczyk
- Score: 6–1, 6–4

Details
- Draw: 32 (4 Q / 3 WC )
- Seeds: 8

Events
Singles	Doubles
- Delray Beach Open

Jack Sock was the defending champion, but lost in the second round to Reilly Opelka.

Frances Tiafoe won his first ATP World Tour title, defeating Peter Gojowczyk in the final, 6–1, 6–4.

== Seeds ==
1. (United States) Jack Sock (second round)
2. (Argentina) Juan Martín del Potro (second round)
3. (South Africa) Kevin Anderson (withdrew)
4. (United States) Sam Querrey (first round)
5. (Australia) Nick Kyrgios (withdrew)
6. (United States) John Isner (second round)
7. (France) Adrian Mannarino (withdrew)
8. (South Korea) Chung Hyeon (quarterfinals)
9. (Canada) Milos Raonic (second round)

== Draw ==
Key

- Q = Qualifier
- WC = Wild card
- LL = Lucky loser
- Alt = Alternate
- ITF = ITF entry
- PR = Protected ranking
- SR = Special ranking
- SE = Special exempt
- JE = Junior exempt
- JR = Junior Accelerator Programme entrant
- CO = College Accelerator Programme entrant
- NG = Next Gen Accelerator Program entrant
- w/o = Walkover
- r = Retired
- d = Defaulted

=== Finals ===
Semifinals
(Germany) Peter Gojowczyk	7^{7}	6
(United States) Steve Johnson	6^{3}	3
(Canada) Denis Shapovalov	5	4
WC	(United States) Frances Tiafoe	7	6

Final
(Germany) Peter Gojowczyk	1	4
WC	(United States) Frances Tiafoe	6	6

=== Top half ===
First round
1	(United States) J Sock	6	6
Q	(Australia) J-P Smith	4	4
WC	(United States) R Opelka	7^{7}	7^{8}
(United States) R Harrison	6^{5}	6^{6}
(Slovakia) L Lacko	6	5	1
(Germany) P Gojowczyk	3	7	6
(Moldova) R Albot	7	3	4
6/WC	(United States) J Isner	5	6	6
LL	(Barbados) D King	4	2
(Russia) E Donskoy	6	6
Q	(India) R Ramanathan	1	2
(United States) D Young	6	6
(United States) S Johnson	6	6
(Georgia (country)) N Basilashvili	3	4
(Japan) T Daniel	1	5
9	(Canada) M Raonic	6	7

Second round
1	(United States) J Sock	6	5	3
WC	(United States) R Opelka	4	7	6
(Germany) P Gojowczyk	7^{7}	6^{4}	7^{7}
6/WC	(United States) J Isner	6^{3}	7^{7}	6^{5}
(Russia) E Donskoy	7^{8}	6
(United States) D Young	6^{6}	3
(United States) S Johnson	6	6
9	(Canada) M Raonic	2	4

Quarterfinals
WC	(United States) R Opelka	6^{5}	3
(Germany) P Gojowczyk	7^{7}	6
(Russia) E Donskoy	1	4
(United States) S Johnson	6	6

Semifinals
(Germany) P Gojowczyk	7^{7}	6
(United States) S Johnson	6^{3}	3

=== Bottom half ===
First round
LL	(Canada) P Polansky	6^{6}	1
(United States) J Donaldson	7^{8}	6
(Canada) D Shapovalov	7	7^{7}
(Croatia) I Karlović	5	6^{4}
(Russia) M Youzhny	7	6
(Israel) D Sela	5	4
(United States) T Fritz	2	6	7^{7}
4	(United States) S Querrey	6	3	6^{4}
8	(South Korea) H Chung	3	6	6
LL	(United Kingdom) C Norrie	6	3	1
Q	(Croatia) F Škugor	6	7
Q	(Kazakhstan) A Bublik	2	5
(Australia) M Ebden	2	6	2
WC	(United States) F Tiafoe	6	2	6
(France) J Chardy	2	4
2	(Argentina) JM del Potro	6	6

Second round
(United States) J Donaldson	7^{8}	4	4
(Canada) D Shapovalov	6^{6}	6	6
(Russia) M Youzhny	1	6	3
(United States) T Fritz	6	4	6
8	(South Korea) H Chung	6	7^{7}
Q	(Croatia) F Škugor	4	6^{4}
WC	(United States) F Tiafoe	7^{8}	4	7
2	(Argentina) JM del Potro	6^{6}	6	5

Quarterfinals
(Canada) D Shapovalov	7	6
(United States) T Fritz	5	4
8	(South Korea) H Chung	7	4	4
WC	(United States) F Tiafoe	5	6	6

Semifinals
(Canada) D Shapovalov	5	4
WC	(United States) F Tiafoe	7	6

== Qualifying ==
=== Seeds ===
1. (United States) Bjorn Fratangelo (qualifying competition)
2. (United Kingdom) Cameron Norrie (qualifying competition, lucky loser)
3. (United States) Tim Smyczek (first round)
4. (Switzerland) Henri Laaksonen (first round)
5. (Spain) Adrián Menéndez Maceiras (first round)
6. (Kazakhstan) Alexander Bublik (qualified)
7. (United States) Ernesto Escobedo (first round, retired)
8. (India) Ramkumar Ramanathan (qualified)

=== Qualifiers ===
1. (India) Ramkumar Ramanathan
2. (Australia) John-Patrick Smith
3. (Kazakhstan) Alexander Bublik
4. (Croatia) Franko Škugor

=== Lucky losers ===
1. (United Kingdom) Cameron Norrie
2. (Barbados) Darian King
3. (Canada) Peter Polansky

=== Qualifying draw ===
==== First qualifier ====
First round
1	(United States) Bjorn Fratangelo	7^{7}	7^{7}
Alt	(United States) Mitchell Krueger	6^{4}	6^{3}
(United States) Stefan Kozlov	3	2
8	(India) Ramkumar Ramanathan	6	6

Qualifying competition
1	(United States) Bjorn Fratangelo	3	3
8	(India) Ramkumar Ramanathan	6	6

==== Second qualifier ====
First round
2	(United Kingdom) Cameron Norrie	6	6
(United Kingdom) Liam Broady	3	1
Alt	(Australia) John-Patrick Smith	6	3
7	(United States) Ernesto Escobedo	3	1^{r}

Qualifying competition
2	(United Kingdom) Cameron Norrie	5	4
Alt	(Australia) John-Patrick Smith	7	6

==== Third qualifier ====
First round
3	(United States) Tim Smyczek	3	7	4
(Barbados) Darian King	6	5	6
WC	(United States) Boris Kozlov	1	4
6	(Kazakhstan) Alexander Bublik	6	6

Qualifying competition
(Barbados) Darian King	6^{6}	6	4
6	(Kazakhstan) Alexander Bublik	7^{8}	3	6

==== Fourth qualifier ====
First round
4	(Switzerland) Henri Laaksonen	3	4
WC	(Croatia) Franko Škugor	6	6
(Canada) Peter Polansky	6	6
5	(Spain) Adrián Menéndez Maceiras	2	3

Qualifying competition
WC	(Croatia) Franko Škugor	6	6
(Canada) Peter Polansky	2	4
