= 2017 Delray Beach Open – Doubles =

Doubles
- 2017 Delray Beach Open

Final
- Champions: (South Africa) Raven Klaasen (United States) Rajeev Ram
- Runners-up: (Philippines) Treat Huey (Belarus) Max Mirnyi
- Score: 7–5, 7–5

Events
Singles	Doubles
← 2016 ·	Delray Beach Open	· 2018 →

Oliver Marach and Fabrice Martin were the defending champions, but lost in the first round to Jonathan Erlich and Scott Lipsky.

Raven Klaasen and Rajeev Ram won the title, defeating Treat Huey and Max Mirnyi in the final, 7–5, 7–5.

== Seeds ==
1. (United States) Bob Bryan / (United States) Mike Bryan (quarterfinals)
2. (South Africa) Raven Klaasen / (United States) Rajeev Ram (champions)
3. (Philippines) Treat Huey / (Belarus) Max Mirnyi (final)
4. (Austria) Oliver Marach / (France) Fabrice Martin (first round)

== Draw ==
=== Key ===
- Q = Qualifier
- WC = Wild card
- LL = Lucky loser
- Alt = Alternate
- SE = Special exempt
- PR = Protected ranking
- ITF = ITF entry
- JE = Junior exempt
- w/o = Walkover
- r = Retired
- d = Defaulted
- SR = Special ranking

=== Draw ===
First round
1	(United States) B Bryan (United States) M Bryan	6	7
(United States) J Donaldson (United States) S Querrey	4	5
(Chinese Taipei) Y-h Lu (India) L Paes	7^{9}	6
WC	(United States) B Fratangelo (United States) T Fritz	6^{7}	3
3	(Philippines) T Huey (Belarus) M Mirnyi	7	6
(Sweden) R Lindstedt (New Zealand) M Venus	5	3
PR	(Germany) T Haas (Canada) V Pospisil	6	6
(Belgium) S Darcis (France) A Mannarino	4	3
(Moldova) R Albot (Bosnia and Herzegovina) D Džumhur	1	4
(United States) B Baker (Croatia) N Mektić	6	6
(Israel) J Erlich (United States) S Lipsky	7^{7}	7^{7}
4	(Austria) O Marach (France) F Martin	6^{5}	6^{5}
WC	(Canada) P Bester (Canada) P Polansky	4	6	[4]
(India) P Raja (India) D Sharan	6	3	[10]
(Russia) K Kravchuk (Israel) D Sela	4	3
2	(South Africa) R Klaasen (United States) R Ram	6	6

Quarterfinals
1	(United States) B Bryan (United States) M Bryan	6^{4}	6	[7]
(Chinese Taipei) Y-h Lu (India) L Paes	7^{7}	2	[10]
3	(Philippines) T Huey (Belarus) M Mirnyi	7^{7}	6
PR	(Germany) T Haas (Canada) V Pospisil	6^{5}	2
(United States) B Baker (Croatia) N Mektić	6	6^{5}	[9]
(Israel) J Erlich (United States) S Lipsky	2	7^{7}	[11]
(India) P Raja (India) D Sharan	5	5
2	(South Africa) R Klaasen (United States) R Ram	7	7

Semifinals
(Chinese Taipei) Y-h Lu (India) L Paes	2	1
3	(Philippines) T Huey (Belarus) M Mirnyi	6	6
(Israel) J Erlich (United States) S Lipsky	3	6	[1]
2	(South Africa) R Klaasen (United States) R Ram	6	3	[10]

Final
3	(Philippines) T Huey (Belarus) M Mirnyi	5	5
2	(South Africa) R Klaasen (United States) R Ram	7	7
