= 2016 Delray Beach International Tennis Championships – Singles =

Singles
- 2016 Delray Beach International Tennis Championships

Final
- Champion: (United States) Sam Querrey
- Runner-up: (United States) Rajeev Ram
- Score: 6–4, 7–6^{(8–6)}

Details
- Draw: 32
- Seeds: 8

Events
Singles	Doubles
- Delray Beach Open

Ivo Karlović was the defending champion, but lost to John-Patrick Smith in the first round.

Sam Querrey won the title, defeating Rajeev Ram in the final, 6–4, 7–6^{(8–6)}.

The tournament marked the return of Juan Martín del Potro after suffered from wrist injury.

== Seeds ==
1. (South Africa) Kevin Anderson (first round, retired)
2. (Australia) Bernard Tomic (first round)
3. (Croatia) Ivo Karlović (first round)
4. (Bulgaria) Grigor Dimitrov (semifinals)
5. (France) Jérémy Chardy (quarterfinals)
6. (United States) Steve Johnson (second round)
7. (United States) Donald Young (second round)
8. (France) Adrian Mannarino (quarterfinals)

== Draw ==
Key

- Q = Qualifier
- WC = Wild card
- LL = Lucky loser
- Alt = Alternate
- ITF = ITF entry
- PR = Protected ranking
- SR = Special ranking
- SE = Special exempt
- JE = Junior exempt
- JR = Junior Accelerator Programme entrant
- CO = College Accelerator Programme entrant
- NG = Next Gen Accelerator Program entrant
- w/o = Walkover
- r = Retired
- d = Defaulted

=== Finals ===
Semifinals
(United States) Sam Querrey	7	7
WC	(Argentina) Juan Martín del Potro	5	5
4	(Bulgaria) Grigor Dimitrov	4	3
(United States) Rajeev Ram	6	6

Final
(United States) Sam Querrey	6	7^{8}
(United States) Rajeev Ram	4	6^{6}

=== Top half ===
First round
1	(South Africa) K Anderson	6^{3}	0^{r}
(United States) A Krajicek	7^{7}	0
(United States) S Querrey	4	6	6
(Netherlands) T de Bakker	6	3	4
SE	(United States) T Fritz	3	3
WC	(United States) T Smyczek	6	6
(Kazakhstan) M Kukushkin	6^{3}	0^{r}
7	(United States) D Young	7^{7}	3
3	(Croatia) I Karlović	3	6	2
Q	(Australia) J-P Smith	6	3	6
WC	(Argentina) JM del Potro	6	6
(United States) D Kudla	1	4
WC	(United States) N Rubin	6	4	7^{8}
(Australia) S Groth	4	6	6^{6}
(Australia) M Ebden	2	1
5	(France) J Chardy	6	6

Second round
(United States) A Krajicek	4	2
(United States) S Querrey	6	6
WC	(United States) T Smyczek	1	7^{7}	6
7	(United States) D Young	6	6^{2}	2
Q	(Australia) J-P Smith	4	4
WC	(Argentina) JM del Potro	6	6
WC	(United States) N Rubin	4	2
5	(France) J Chardy	6	6

Quarterfinals
(United States) S Querrey	6^{1}	7^{7}	6
WC	(United States) T Smyczek	7^{7}	6^{4}	4
WC	(Argentina) JM del Potro	6	6
5	(France) J Chardy	2	3

Semifinals
(United States) S Querrey	7	7
WC	(Argentina) JM del Potro	5	5

=== Bottom half ===
First round
8	(France) A Mannarino	1	6	6
(Tunisia) M Jaziri	6	3	1
Q	(Japan) T Ito	6	6
Q	(United States) D Novikov	2	4
(Bosnia and Herzegovina) D Džumhur	6	6
(Lithuania) R Berankis	4	2
(Israel) D Sela	4	2
4	(Bulgaria) G Dimitrov	6	6
6	(United States) S Johnson	6	5	7^{10}
(Australia) J Millman	3	7	6^{8}
Q	(Moldova) R Albot	4	1
(Germany) B Becker	6	6
(Spain) M Granollers	3	4
(Ukraine) I Marchenko	6	6
(United States) R Ram	7^{7}	6
2	(Australia) B Tomic	6^{3}	1

Second round
8	(France) A Mannarino	7^{8}	6^{4}	6
Q	(Japan) T Ito	6^{6}	7^{7}	3
(Bosnia and Herzegovina) D Džumhur	6	4	3
4	(Bulgaria) G Dimitrov	4	6	6
6	(United States) S Johnson	7	6^{1}	3
(Germany) B Becker	5	7^{7}	6
(Ukraine) I Marchenko	2	7	4
(United States) R Ram	6	5	6

Quarterfinals
8	(France) A Mannarino	4	5
4	(Bulgaria) G Dimitrov	6	7
(Germany) B Becker	6	4	3
(United States) R Ram	3	6	6

Semifinals
4	(Bulgaria) G Dimitrov	4	3
(United States) R Ram	6	6

== Qualifying ==
=== Seeds ===
1. (Italy) Luca Vanni (qualifying competition)
2. (Japan) Tatsuma Ito (qualified)
3. (Moldova) Radu Albot (qualified)
4. (Colombia) Alejandro Falla (qualifying competition)
5. (Japan) Yoshihito Nishioka (qualifying competition)
6. (United States) Bjorn Fratangelo (qualifying competition)
7. (Australia) John-Patrick Smith (qualified)
8. (United States) Dennis Novikov (qualified)

=== Qualifiers ===
1. (United States) Dennis Novikov
2. (Japan) Tatsuma Ito
3. (Moldova) Radu Albot
4. (Australia) John-Patrick Smith

=== Qualifying draw ===
==== First qualifier ====
First round
1	(Italy) Luca Vanni	7	6
Alt	(Ukraine) Artem Smirnov	5	2
(United States) Jared Donaldson	3	7^{7}	3
8	(United States) Dennis Novikov	6	6^{4}	6

Qualifying competition
1	(Italy) Luca Vanni	6^{0}	6	6^{6}
8	(United States) Dennis Novikov	7^{7}	3	7^{8}

==== Second qualifier ====
First round
2	(Japan) Tatsuma Ito	6	6^{5}	7
(Republic of Ireland) James McGee	3	7^{7}	5
WC	(Italy) Edoardo Tessaro	2	3
6	(United States) Bjorn Fratangelo	6	6

Qualifying competition
2	(Japan) Tatsuma Ito	6	4	6
6	(United States) Bjorn Fratangelo	3	6	4

==== Third qualifier ====
First round
3	(Moldova) Radu Albot	5	6	6
Alt	(United States) Eric Quigley	7	4	1
WC	(United States) Tommy Paul	4	7	4
5	(Japan) Yoshihito Nishioka	6	5	6

Qualifying competition
3	(Moldova) Radu Albot	6	6
5	(Japan) Yoshihito Nishioka	4	3

==== Fourth qualifier ====
First round
4	(Colombia) Alejandro Falla	5	6	6
(India) Somdev Devvarman	7	2	1
(Russia) Andrey Rublev	6	3	0
7	(Australia) John-Patrick Smith	4	6	6

Qualifying competition
4	(Colombia) Alejandro Falla	2	6	1
7	(Australia) John-Patrick Smith	6	2	6
