= 2017 Delray Beach Open – Singles =

Singles
- 2017 Delray Beach Open

Final
- Champion: (United States) Jack Sock
- Runner-up: (Canada) Milos Raonic
- Score: Walkover

Details
- Draw: 32 (4 Q / 3 WC )
- Seeds: 8

Events
Singles	Doubles
- Delray Beach Open

Sam Querrey was the defending champion, but lost in the quarterfinals to Juan Martín del Potro.

Jack Sock won the title after Milos Raonic withdrew from the final due to a hamstring injury.

== Seeds ==
1. (Canada) Milos Raonic (final, withdrew because of a hamstring injury)
2. (Croatia) Ivo Karlović (first round)
3. (United States) Jack Sock (champion)
4. (United States) Sam Querrey (quarterfinals)
5. (United States) Steve Johnson (quarterfinals)
6. (Australia) Bernard Tomic (first round)
7. (Argentina) Juan Martín del Potro (semifinals)
8. (United Kingdom) Kyle Edmund (quarterfinals)

== Draw ==
Key

- Q = Qualifier
- WC = Wild card
- LL = Lucky loser
- Alt = Alternate
- ITF = ITF entry
- PR = Protected ranking
- SR = Special ranking
- SE = Special exempt
- JE = Junior exempt
- JR = Junior Accelerator Programme entrant
- CO = College Accelerator Programme entrant
- NG = Next Gen Accelerator Program entrant
- w/o = Walkover
- r = Retired
- d = Defaulted

=== Finals ===
Semifinals
1	(Canada) Milos Raonic	6	7^{8}
7	(Argentina) Juan Martín del Potro	3	6^{6}
3	(United States) Jack Sock	6	7^{7}
(United States) Donald Young	4	6^{2}

Final
1	(Canada) Milos Raonic
3	(United States) Jack Sock	w/o

=== Top half ===
First round
1	(Canada) M Raonic	6	6
Q	(United States) T Smyczek	1	4
(Colombia) S Giraldo	2	3
(Croatia) B Ćorić	6	6
WC	(United States) B Fratangelo	6	5	4
(Chinese Taipei) Y-h Lu	4	7	6
(France) A Mannarino	3	0
8	(United Kingdom) K Edmund	6	6
4/WC	(United States) S Querrey	6	2
(Israel) D Sela	2	1^{r}
(United States) J Donaldson	7^{7}	3	6
(Kazakhstan) M Kukushkin	6^{5}	6	3
(Russia) K Kravchuk	3	4
(Bosnia and Herzegovina) D Džumhur	6	6
(South Africa) K Anderson	4	4
7	(Argentina) JM del Potro	6	6

Second round
1	(Canada) M Raonic	6	7^{7}
(Croatia) B Ćorić	3	6^{2}
(Chinese Taipei) Y-h Lu	3	6	2
8	(United Kingdom) K Edmund	6	3	6
4/WC	(United States) S Querrey	6	6
(United States) J Donaldson	2	3
(Bosnia and Herzegovina) D Džumhur	6^{5}	6	3
7	(Argentina) JM del Potro	7^{7}	4	6

Quarterfinals
1	(Canada) M Raonic	4	6	6
8	(United Kingdom) K Edmund	6	3	4
4/WC	(United States) S Querrey	5	5
7	(Argentina) JM del Potro	7	7

Semifinals
1	(Canada) M Raonic	6	7^{8}
7	(Argentina) JM del Potro	3	6^{6}

=== Bottom half ===
First round
5	(United States) S Johnson	6	6
WC	(United States) S Kozlov	1	4
(Japan) Y Nishioka	6	6
Q	(Belgium) K Coppejans	3	3
(Germany) D Brown	3	3
(Spain) G García López	6	6
(Moldova) R Albot	4	6^{2}
3	(United States) J Sock	6	7^{7}
6	(Australia) B Tomic	6	1	4
Q	(Belgium) S Darcis	3	6	6
(Georgia (country)) N Basilashvili	6^{4}	7^{10}	6
PR	(Germany) T Haas	7^{7}	6^{8}	2
(United States) T Fritz	6	6
Q	(Japan) A Santillan	4	4
(United States) D Young	7^{7}	7^{7}
2	(Croatia) I Karlović	6^{5}	6^{3}

Second round
5	(United States) S Johnson	6	6
(Japan) Y Nishioka	4	1
(Spain) G García López	4	1
3	(United States) J Sock	6	6
Q	(Belgium) S Darcis	6	7
(Georgia (country)) N Basilashvili	3	5
(United States) T Fritz	6	3	4
(United States) D Young	4	6	6

Quarterfinals
5	(United States) S Johnson	4	6^{4}
3	(United States) J Sock	6	7^{7}
Q	(Belgium) S Darcis
(United States) D Young	w/o

Semifinals
3	(United States) J Sock	6	7^{7}
(United States) D Young	4	6^{2}

== Qualifying ==
=== Seeds ===
1. (Belgium) Steve Darcis (qualified)
2. (South Korea) Chung Hyeon (qualifying competition)
3. (Canada) Vasek Pospisil (qualifying competition)
4. (Germany) Tobias Kamke (first round)
5. (United States) Rajeev Ram (first round)
6. (Canada) Peter Polansky (first round)
7. (Germany) Benjamin Becker (qualifying competition)
8. (Barbados) Darian King (qualifying competition)

=== Qualifiers ===
1. (Belgium) Steve Darcis
2. (Belgium) Kimmer Coppejans
3. (United States) Tim Smyczek
4. (Japan) Akira Santillan

=== Qualifying draw ===
==== First qualifier ====
First round
1	(Belgium) Steve Darcis	6	6
Alt	(United States) Marcos Giron	2	0
(Sweden) Elias Ymer	4	1
8	(Barbados) Darian King	6	6

Qualifying competition
1	(Belgium) Steve Darcis	6	6
8	(Barbados) Darian King	1	4

==== Second qualifier ====
First round
2	(South Korea) Chung Hyeon	6	6
WC	(Hungary) Péter Nagy	2	0
Alt	(Belgium) Kimmer Coppejans	4	7	7^{7}
5	(United States) Rajeev Ram	6	5	6^{5}

Qualifying competition
2	(South Korea) Chung Hyeon	6	2	2
Alt	(Belgium) Kimmer Coppejans	3	6	6

==== Third qualifier ====
First round
3	(Canada) Vasek Pospisil	6	6
WC	(United States) Boris Kozlov	4	1
(United States) Tim Smyczek	6	6
6	(Canada) Peter Polansky	2	2

Qualifying competition
3	(Canada) Vasek Pospisil	2	2
(United States) Tim Smyczek	6	6

==== Fourth qualifier ====
First round
4	(Germany) Tobias Kamke	3	6^{4}
Alt	(Japan) Akira Santillan	6	7^{7}
Alt	(Canada) Philip Bester	2	7^{7}	2
7	(Germany) Benjamin Becker	6	6^{2}	6

Qualifying competition
Alt	(Japan) Akira Santillan	6	6
7	(Germany) Benjamin Becker	1	2
