= Anderson Reed =

American tennis player

- Country (sports): United States
- Born: September 19, 1990 (age 35) Mobile, Alabama, United States
- Height: 1.73 m (5 ft 8 in)
- Plays: Right-handed (two-handed backhand)
- Prize money: $23,853

Singles
- Career record: 0–0 (at ATP Tour level, Grand Slam level, and in Davis Cup)
- Career titles: 0 ITF
- Highest ranking: No. 1,482 (9 November 2015)

Doubles
- Career record: 0–1 (at ATP Tour level, Grand Slam level, and in Davis Cup)
- Career titles: 6 ITF
- Highest ranking: No. 370 (31 October 2016)

Anderson Reed (born September 19, 1990) is an American tennis player.

Reed has a career high ATP singles ranking of No. 1,482 achieved on 9 November 2015 and a career high ATP doubles ranking of No. 370 achieved on 31 October 2016.

Reed made his ATP main draw debut at the 2018 Delray Beach Open in the doubles draw partnering Darian King.
