= Frances Tiafoe =

American tennis player (born 1998)

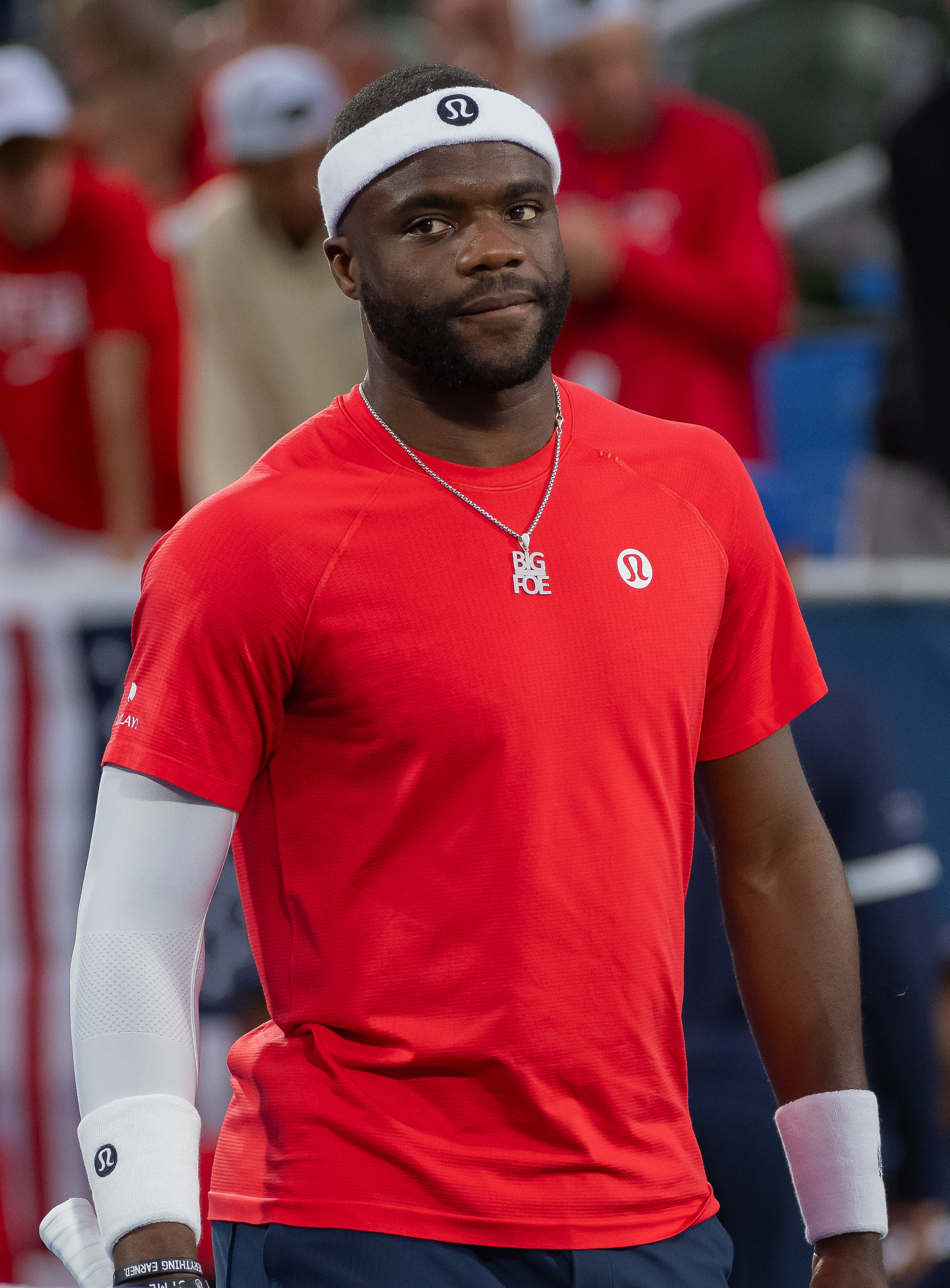
- Tiafoe at the 2025 Davis Cup Qualifiers
- Country (sports): United States
- Residence: Orlando, Florida, US
- Born: January 20, 1998 (age 28) Hyattsville, Maryland, US
- Height: 6 ft 2 in (1.88 m)
- Turned pro: 2015
- Plays: Right-handed (two-handed backhand)
- Coach: Mark Kovacs (2026–present)
- Prize money: US $20,155,046: 39th all-time in earnings

Singles
- Career record: 278–231
- Career titles: 4
- Highest ranking: No. 8 (September 14, 2026)
- Current ranking: No. 8 (9 November, 2026)

Grand Slam singles results
- Australian Open: QF (2019)
- French Open: QF (2025)
- Wimbledon: 4R (2022)
- US Open: SF (2022, 2024, 2026)

Other tournaments
- Tour Finals: RR (2026)
- Olympic Games: 2R (2021)

Doubles
- Career record: 32–58
- Career titles: 0
- Highest ranking: No. 160 (November 1, 2021)

Grand Slam doubles results
- Australian Open: 3R (2021)
- French Open: 2R (2021, 2022)
- Wimbledon: 1R (2017, 2018)
- US Open: 2R (2014)

Other doubles tournaments
- Olympic Games: 2R (2021)

Grand Slam mixed doubles results
- US Open: 1R (2025)

Team competitions
- Davis Cup: SF (2018)
- Hopman Cup: RR (2019)
- Last updated on: September 14, 2026.

Frances Tiafoe Jr. (/tiˈɑːfoʊ/ tee-AH-foh; born January 20, 1998) is an American professional tennis player. He has a career-high ranking of world No. 8 in men's singles by the Association of Tennis Professionals (ATP), achieved in September 2026, and a best doubles ranking of No. 160, reached in November 2021. Tiafoe has won four ATP Tour singles titles across all three surfaces. His best performances at the majors have been three semifinals at the US Open. He is the current American No. 2 in men's singles.

The son of Sierra Leonean immigrants, Tiafoe was first trained at the Junior Tennis Champions Center (JTCC), where his father worked as the head of maintenance. At 15, Tiafoe won the 2013 Orange Bowl, the tournament's youngest-ever boys' singles champion. As a teenager, he won the US Junior National Championship and enjoyed success on the ATP Challenger Tour, reaching nine finals and winning four titles.

Tiafoe broke into the top 100 of the ATP rankings in 2016. At the 2019 Australian Open and 2025 French Open, he reached the quarterfinals, and at the 2022 US Open, he reached the semifinals of a major for the first time, a feat he repeated at the 2024 and the 2026 US Opens.

== Early life and background ==
Tiafoe (nicknamed "Big Foe" or simply "Foe") was born on January 20, 1998, along with his twin brother, Franklin, in Maryland, to Constant (better known as Frances Sr.) Tiafoe and Alphina Kamara, immigrants from Sierra Leone. His father immigrated to the United States in 1993, while his mother joined him in 1996 to escape the civil war in their country. In 1999, his father began working as a day laborer on a construction crew that built the Junior Tennis Champions Center (JTCC) in College Park, Maryland. When the facility was completed, he was hired as the on-site custodian and given a spare office to live in at the center. The Tiafoe brothers lived with their father at the center for five days a week for the next 11 years. They took advantage of their living situation to start playing tennis regularly at age 4. They stayed with their mother when she was not working night shifts as a nurse.

When Tiafoe and his brother were 5 years old, their father arranged for them to begin training at the JTCC, bypassing their usual fees. When Tiafoe was 8 years old, Misha Kouznetsov began coaching him at the center, taking interest in him after seeing his work ethic and interest in the sport. Kouznetsov helped sponsor Tiafoe's participation in tournaments as he progressed through the junior ranks. He continued to coach Tiafoe for nine years until he moved to the USTA National Training Center in Boca Raton, Florida. Tiafoe's brother Franklin stayed in Maryland, where he attended Laurel Springs School, an accredited, NCAA approved online school, while playing high school tennis at DeMatha Catholic High School and later played college tennis at Salisbury University.

== Juniors ==
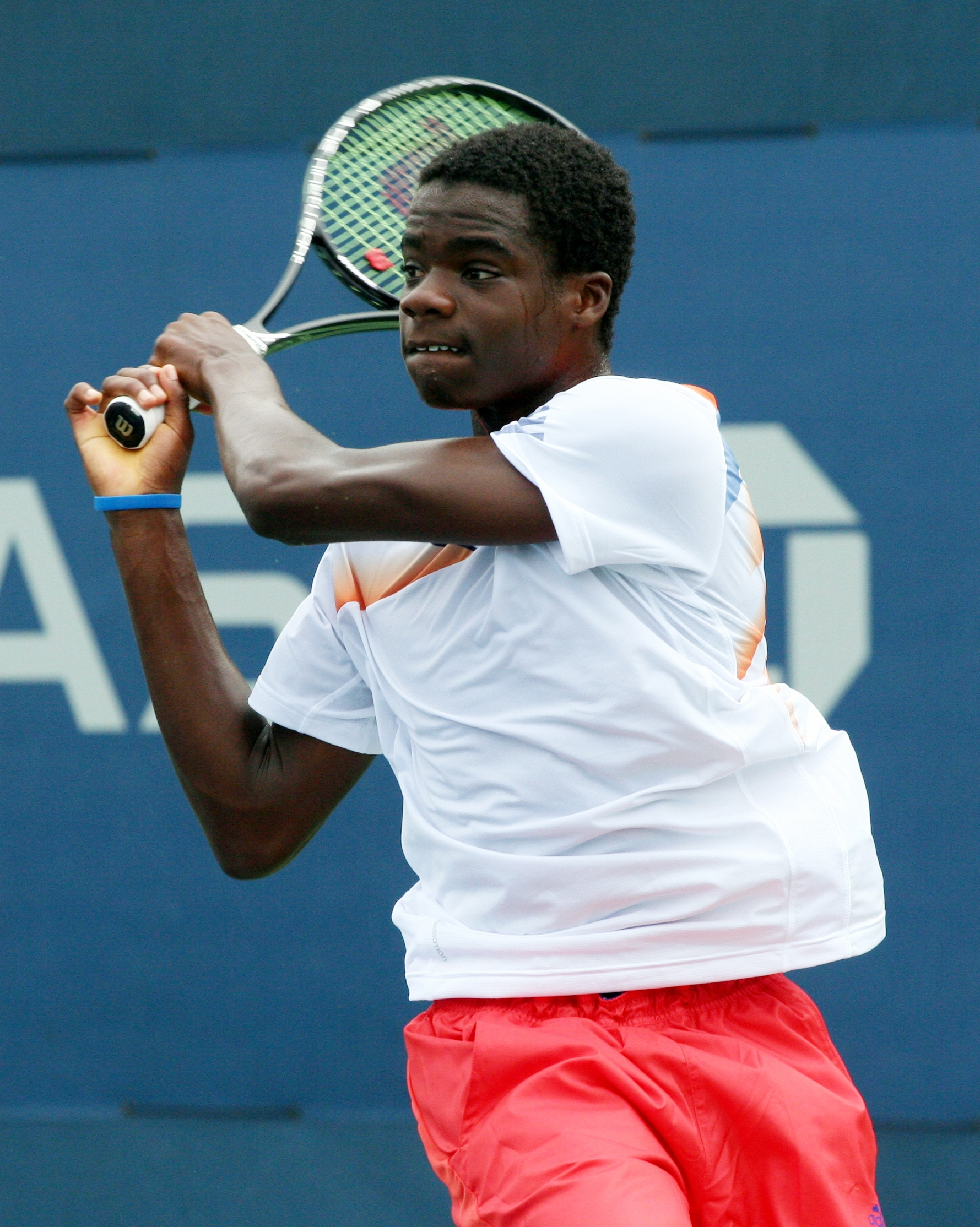
Tiafoe at 2013 US Open

Tiafoe won enough high-level junior titles to reach world No. 2 in the International Tennis Federation (ITF) junior rankings. His success at the juniors combined with his unusual upbringing helped him rise to national prominence before he turned pro. At the age of 14, Tiafoe won his first prestigious international tournament at Les Petits As in France. The following year, in December 2013, Tiafoe became the youngest player to win the Orange Bowl, one of the highest-tier Grade A events on the ITF Junior Circuit. He defeated compatriot Stefan Kozlov in the final a month before turning 16. Several months later, he also won the Easter Bowl, a second-tier Grade B1 event.

With these two big titles, Tiafoe was the top seed at the 2014 French Open junior tournament, where he was upset in the second round. He then lost at Wimbledon to the eventual champion Noah Rubin. Tiafoe produced his best result at a junior Grand Slam tournament at the US Open, where he reached the semifinals before losing a tight match to Quentin Halys. That was the last ITF tournament he would play at the junior level. In August 2015, Tiafoe capped his junior career by winning the USTA Junior National Championship at the age of 17. Tiafoe defeated Stefan Kozlov in the final in a five-set match, taking the first two sets and the last. With the win, he earned a wildcard into the main draw at the 2015 US Open.

=== Junior Grand Slam results – Singles ===
Australian Open: A (-)
French Open: 2R (2014)
Wimbledon: 3R (2014)
US Open: SF (2014)

== Professional ==
=== 2014–15: French and US Open debuts ===
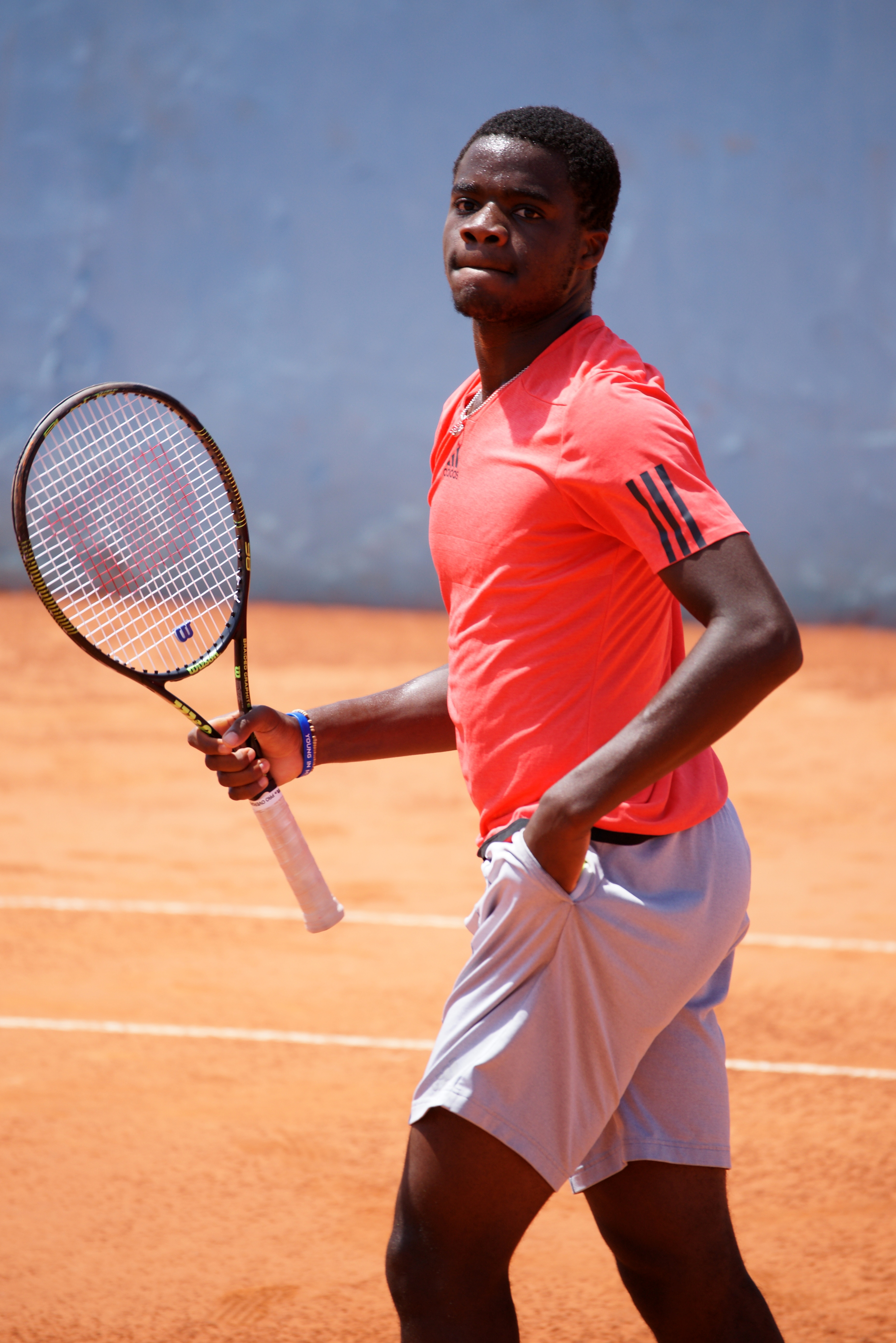
Tiafoe at the Open de Nice in 2015

Tiafoe made his ATP Tour main-draw debut at the age of 16 and a half after being granted a wildcard by his home tournament, the 2014 Washington Open. He lost to Evgeny Donskoy in his first career tour-level match. At the 2014 US Open, Tiafoe received a wildcard into the qualifying draw but lost to 11th seed Tatsuma Ito. In the doubles tournament, he was awarded a wildcard into the main draw with Michael Mmoh. The two teenagers picked up their first career win at the ATP level in the first round by defeating veterans Víctor Estrella Burgos and Teymuraz Gabashvili, before losing in the second round. In March 2015, he claimed his first professional title by winning the ITF Futures tournament at Bakersfield. He officially turned pro the following month.

In April 2015, Tiafoe broke through onto the ATP Challenger level. After starting the month ranked below the top 800 in the world, he put together a string of solid results that pushed him into the top 300 in the world by the time the first set of ATP rankings were published in May. Even though his ranking was too low to gain direct entry into any of the three American clay-court Challenger events, Tiafoe reached the quarterfinals of Sarasota as a qualifier, then reached the semifinals of Savannah as a wildcard, and finally reached his first career Challenger final at Tallahassee with a special exempt. At the last tournament, he defeated top seed Facundo Bagnis to notch his first win against a top-100 opponent. Tiafoe's performance at these events was good enough to win the 2015 Har-Tru Challenge and earn the only American wildcard spot into the main draw of the 2015 French Open. In his Grand Slam debut, Tiafoe lost his first-round match to Martin Kližan. Nonetheless, he became the first 17-year-old American to play in the main draw of the men's singles tournament since Michael Chang and Pete Sampras in 1989.

At the Winston-Salem Open in August, Tiafoe entered the main draw as a qualifier and won his first ATP Tour-level match defeating James Duckworth in a third-set tiebreaker. He then made his main-draw debut at the US Open with the wildcard he earned from winning the junior national championship. He would lose to the No. 22 seed, Viktor Troicki, in the first round. Tiafoe continued his success on the Challenger Tour and reached a second final at Knoxville losing to Dan Evans. Driven by his success at the Challenger level, Tiafoe climbed to a year-end ranking of 176, cracking the top 200 a few months before turning 18 years old.

=== 2016: Challenger titles and top 100 ===
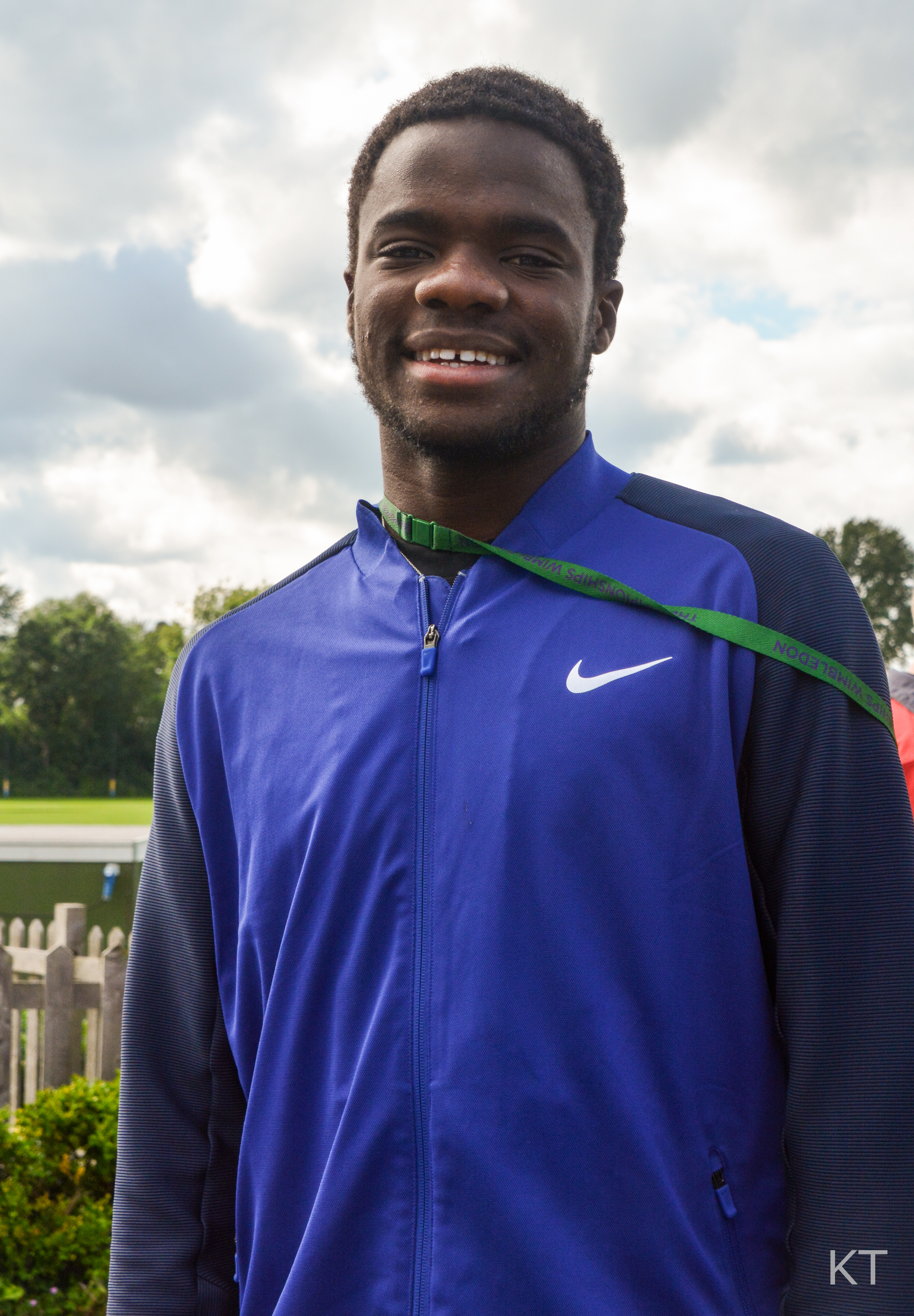
Frances Tiafoe at Wimbledon in 2016

In the 2016 season, Tiafoe consistently produced deep Challenger-level tournament runs but was unable to break through in his few opportunities at the ATP Tour level. At the Indian Wells Masters, Tiafoe was awarded a wild card into the main draw and won his first-round match against his compatriot rival, No. 80 Taylor Fritz, in their first ever ATP-level match. This would turn out to be his only ATP match win of the year. He lost his next match to David Goffin in a third-set tiebreak. Tiafoe's best performance in the clay-court season came at Tallahassee where he avenged his loss to Facundo Arguello in the final the previous year by knocking him out in the first round. For the second consecutive year, he was able to reach the final, this time losing to fellow teenager Quentin Halys.

Tiafoe began his return to the North American hardcourts by reaching his second Challenger final of the year at Winnetka before losing to top-seeded Yoshihito Nishioka. He then reached his third consecutive Challenger final in the United States at Lexington. The following week at Granby, Tiafoe reached his fourth Challenger final in five such events in North America. He defeated Marcelo Arévalo in the final to capture his first Challenger title and climb to a career-high ranking of No. 123 in the world. Tiafoe was awarded a wildcard into the US Open, his only Grand Slam main draw of the year. He faced off against American veteran John Isner in the first round and won the first two sets, but eventually lost the match in a fifth-set tiebreak. In October, Tiafoe cracked the top 100 for the first time by winning the maiden event at Stockton, defeating fellow American Noah Rubin in the final. He finished the year ranked 108, making him the highest-ranked player at his age for the second year in a row.

=== 2017: Doubles final ===
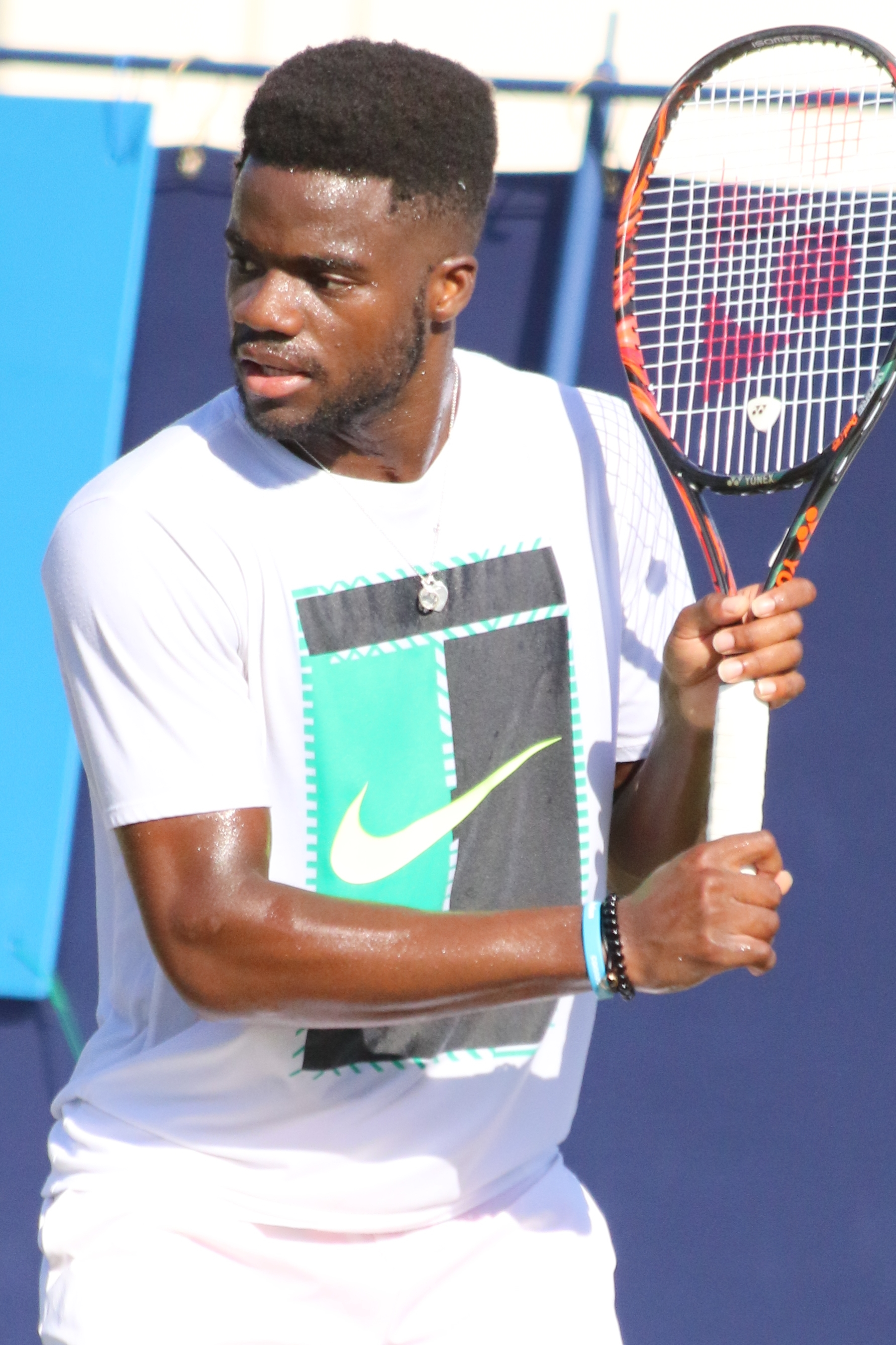
Tiafoe at the 2017 Eastbourne International

At the Australian Open, Tiafoe began the year by reaching the main draw of a Grand Slam through qualifying for the first time and then recording his first career major match win over Mikhail Kukushkin. To close out the winter hard court season, he also qualified for the Miami Masters and won his first round match before falling to Roger Federer. Tiafoe followed up a good start to the year on the hard courts with a very impressive clay court season that helped his ranking climb to No. 65 in the world. He began with the US Men's Clay Court Championships in Houston, where he reached his first career ATP final in the doubles event, after partnering with veteran Dustin Brown as a wildcard entry. He then continued his success on clay by winning back-to-back Challenger titles over the next three weeks at the Sarasota Open on green clay and the Open du Pays d'Aix on red clay, the former of which included a victory over former top-10 player Jürgen Melzer in the semifinals.

In his Wimbledon debut, Tiafoe defeated Robin Haase in four sets for his first win over an opponent ranked in the top-50. He followed this up with his first top-10 win over world No. 7, Alexander Zverev, at the Cincinnati Masters in August. Tiafoe gained more prominence after taking Roger Federer to five sets in his first-round match on Arthur Ashe Stadium at the US Open. In September, captain John McEnroe chose Tiafoe to replace Juan Martín del Potro for Team World in the inaugural Laver Cup, which mostly featured players in the top-25 of the ATP rankings. He lost his only match to Marin Čilić. Tiafoe achieved a year-end ranking inside the top 100 for the first time, but only managed to be named the first alternate for the inaugural Next Generation ATP Finals.

=== 2018: First ATP Tour title and top 50 ===
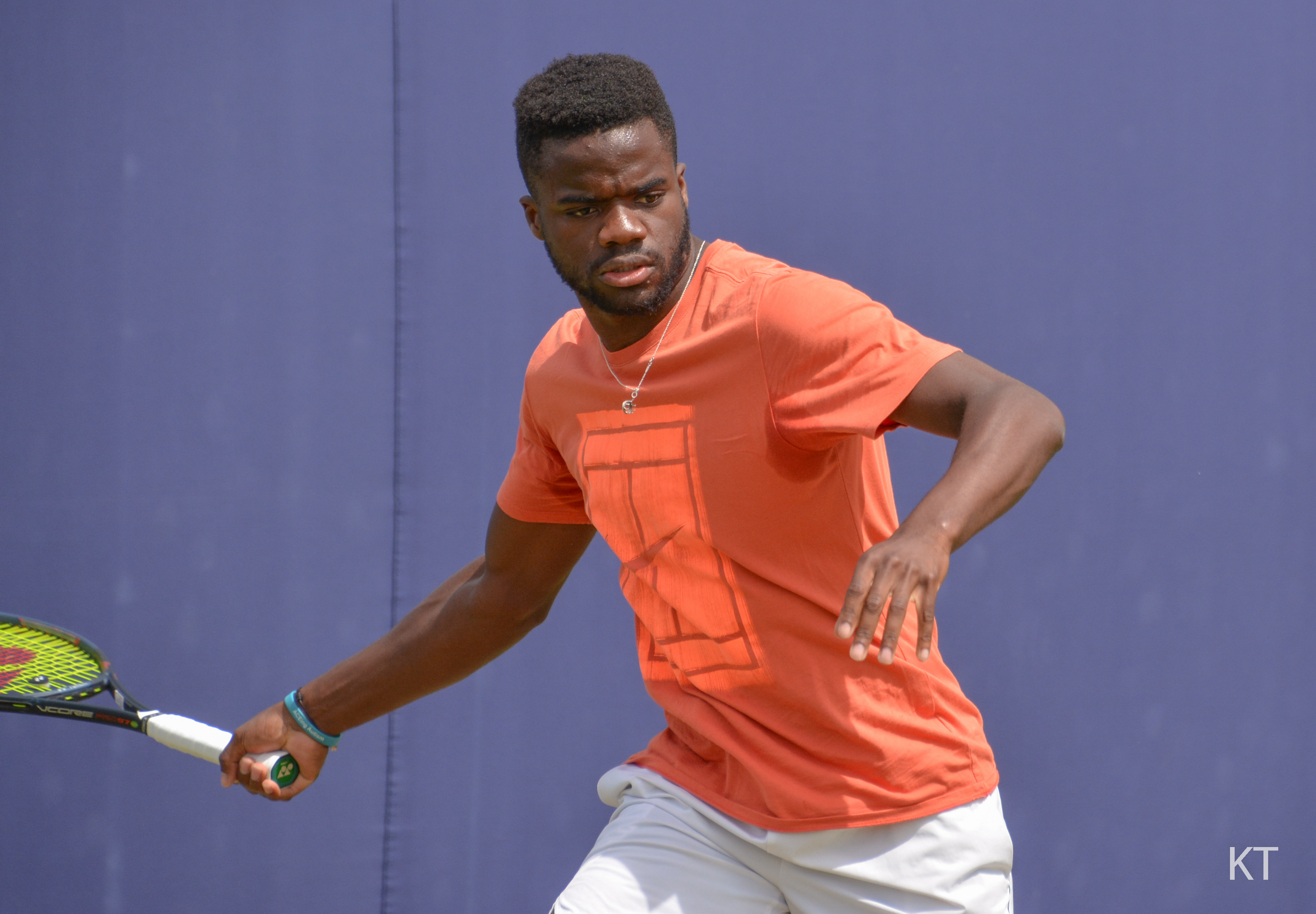
Frances Tiafoe at the 2018 Queen's Club Championships in London

Tiafoe entered the year having struggled on the ATP Tour, with just nine wins in 38 matches. Nonetheless, he would quadruple that number of wins by the end of the season. At the inaugural New York Open, Tiafoe reached his first career quarterfinal at an ATP Tour-level event before losing to top seed Kevin Anderson. The following week, Tiafoe entered the Delray Beach Open as a wildcard and won his first ATP title after beating Peter Gojowczyk in the final. He became the first wildcard entry to win the tournament. Along the way, he defeated his idol and world No. 10, Juan Martín del Potro, as well as fellow Next Gen players Hyeon Chung and Denis Shapovalov. With the victory, he became the youngest American to win an ATP title since Andy Roddick won the US Clay Court Championships in 2002. Tiafoe's win streak was snapped in the first round of the Indian Wells Masters by his compatriot Ernesto Escobedo. However, he bounced back at the Miami Masters to reach the fourth round, a career-best at a Masters event. He upset Tomáš Berdych in the third round before losing to Kevin Anderson for the second time this year.

Tiafoe continued his success at the ATP level into the clay-court season. He played at the Portugal Open for the first time and reached his second ATP final of the year, despite needing to save three match points in the first round. He upset the defending champion, No. 11 Pablo Carreño Busta, in the semifinals before losing to hometown favorite João Sousa in the final. Nonetheless, he became the youngest American to reach a clay-court final in Europe since Andre Agassi played in the French Open final in 1990.

Tiafoe followed up on this success at Wimbledon by picking up his first win over a seeded opponent at a major against No. 30, Fernando Verdasco, en route to reaching the third round of a major for the first time. With this performance, he also broke into the top-50 of the ATP rankings after the tournament.

During the US Open Series, Tiafoe had his best result at the Canadian Open. He defeated two top-30 players, including hometown favorite Milos Raonic, before losing to No. 5 Grigor Dimitrov in a third-set tiebreak. At the US Open, Tiafoe won his first career match at the event against No. 29, Adrian Mannarino, before losing to fellow Next Gen player Alex de Minaur in the second round. Following the last major event of the year, Tiafoe made his Davis Cup debut for the United States in the semifinal against Croatia. After easily losing to Marin Čilić in straight sets, Tiafoe played in the fifth and decisive rubber against Borna Ćorić. Despite taking a two set to one lead, he ultimately lost the match as the United States lost the tie. For the second straight year, Tiafoe replaced Juan Martín del Potro in the Laver Cup. He again lost his only match, this time to Dimitrov. At the end of the season, Tiafoe qualified for the Next Gen ATP Finals, having just barely failed to qualify the previous year. He defeated Hubert Hurkacz in his round robin group, but lost to Jaume Munar and the eventual champion, Stefanos Tsitsipas, as he did not advance out of the group. Tiafoe finished the year ranked No. 39 in the world.

=== 2019: Top 30 debut ===
Tiafoe's biggest result of the year came at the Australian Open, where he made it to the quarterfinals of a major for the first time. During the tournament, he upset No. 5 Kevin Anderson in the second round as well as No. 20, Grigor Dimitrov, in the fourth round before losing to No. 2, Rafael Nadal. As a result of this run, he reached a career-high ranking of world No. 29, on February 11, 2019.

Tiafoe could not build on this success during the rest of the season. He did not win multiple matches at a tournament again until reaching the quarterfinals at the Miami Open, where he lost to Denis Shapovalov. He could not defend the points from his title at the 2019 Delray Beach Open or his runner-up at the 2019 Estoril Open a year earlier, losing in the first round at the former and in the quarterfinals at the latter. Tiafoe closed out the clay-court season with a first-round loss at the French Open to Filip Krajinović in which he struggled with an illness. He faced more difficult draws at Wimbledon and the US Open, losing to No. 10 Fabio Fognini in the opening round of the former and No. 7 Alexander Zverev in the second round of the latter, despite pushing both opening to five sets. At the end of the season, Tiafoe qualified for the Next Generation ATP Finals. He was placed in a round-robin group with Ugo Humbert, Mikael Ymer, and Jannik Sinner. After an opening-match loss to Sinner, Tiafoe defeated Humbert and Ymer to advance to knockout rounds. There, he was defeated by top seed Alex de Minaur. Tiafoe finished the season ranked No. 47 in the world.

=== 2020: US Open fourth round ===
Tiafoe dropped out of the top 50 in February, after losing his quarterfinal points from the 2019 Australian Open when he was defeated in the first round of the 2020 Australian Open by Daniil Medvedev.

At the US Open, Tiafoe advanced to the third round of the tournament for the first time by defeating Andreas Seppi of Italy, then John Millman of Australia. In the third round, he knocked out Márton Fucsovics of Hungary in straight sets and moved onto the round of 16, becoming at 22 the youngest American man to advance that far in the US Open since Donald Young in 2011. He lost in straight sets in the round of 16 to the tournament's third seed, Daniil Medvedev of Russia. Tiafoe finished the season ranked No. 59 in the world.

=== 2021: First top-5 win, ATP 500 final ===
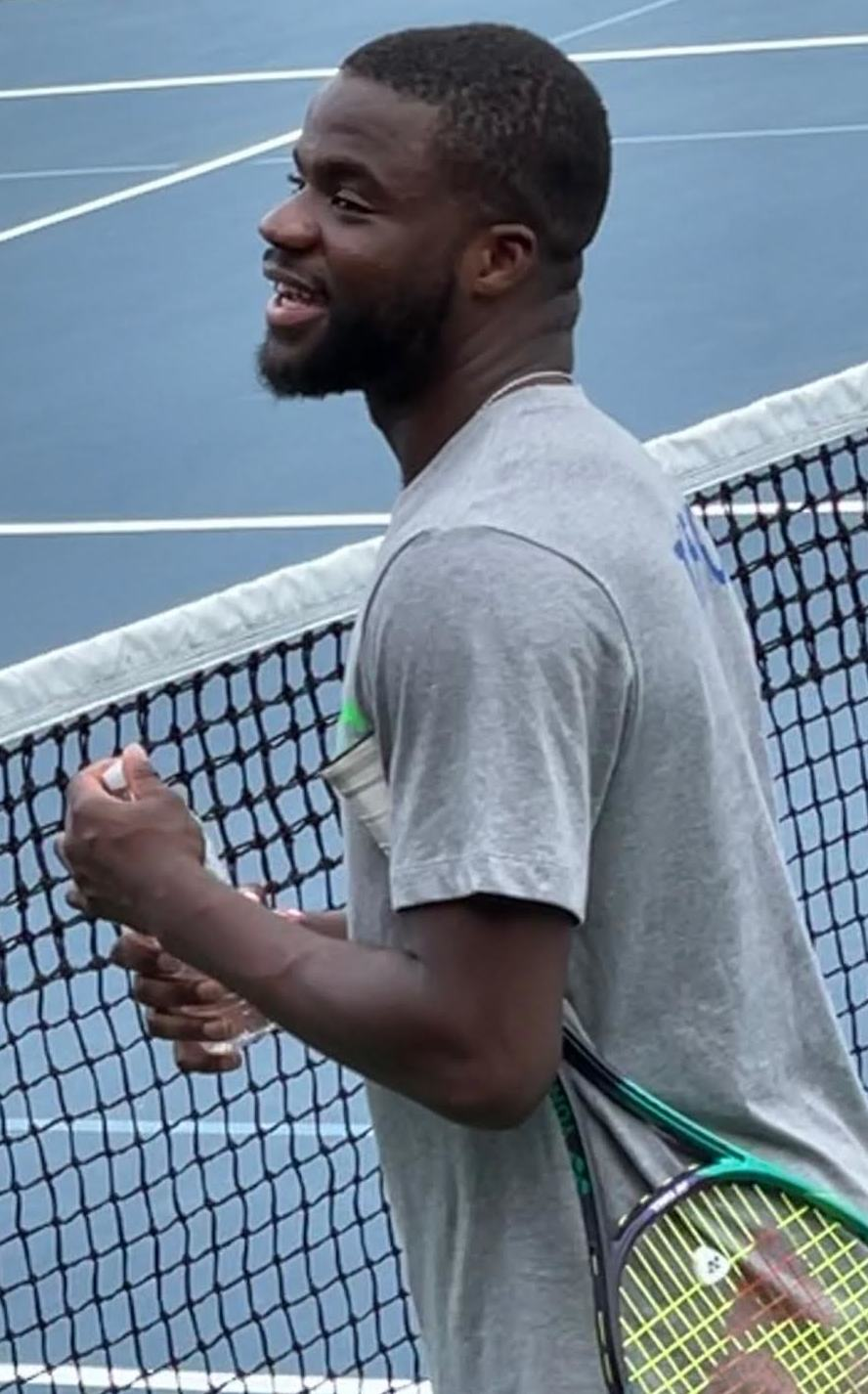
Tiafoe at JTCC in 2021

Tiafoe started the year at the Delray Beach Open, where he was beaten by Cameron Norrie in the quarterfinals. He then lost in the second round of the Australian Open and in the first or second rounds of several ATP 250 tournaments. At the Miami Open, he beat top-30 player Dan Evans in a comeback, but lost in the round of 16 to No.1 seed Daniil Medvedev. He did not have good results during the European Clay Swing as he could not qualify for the main draw of the Madrid Masters or the Rome Masters and he lost in the first round of the French Open to Steve Johnson, despite being up two sets to love.

Tiafoe started his grass-court season by defeating Denis Kudla to win the Nottingham Open. Tiafoe reached the quarterfinals at the Queen's Club Championships, where he lost to Denis Shapovalov. Later that grass-court season, Tiafoe had one of his greatest career wins in the first round of Wimbledon, beating world No. 4 and 2021 French Open finalist, Stefanos Tsitsipas, in straight sets to gain his first win against a top-5 player. Tiafoe became just the second American man since 2010 to defeat a top-three seed at a major, joining Sam Querrey, who did it at Wimbledon in both 2016 and 2017. He then defeated Vasek Pospisil in the second round in straight sets to reach the third round at Wimbledon for the second time in his career, where he lost to Karen Khachanov. At the 2020 Olympics, Tiafoe lost in the second round to Tsitsipas, who took his revenge for the Wimbledon loss.

At the Canadian Open, Tiafoe lost in the second round of qualifying to Emil Ruusuvuori, but was awarded a lucky-loser spot in the main draw after fellow American Sebastian Korda withdrew. He defeated qualifier Yoshihito Nishioka in the first round, and then earned his second top-10 victory of the year by upsetting 10th-ranked home favorite Denis Shapovalov in the second round. He lost in the third round to Gaël Monfils. The following week at the Western & Southern Open, Tiafoe defeated Ugo Humbert, but lost in the second round to Diego Schwartzman.

At the US Open, he reached the fourth round for a second consecutive year by defeating fifth seed and world No. 7, Andrey Rublev in a five-set match. Tiafoe was the first American man to reach the second week at the US Open in consecutive years since Andy Roddick and Mardy Fish in 2011–12. He was then defeated by Félix Auger-Aliassime.

Tiafoe had to enter the main draw via qualifying in Vienna, beating Alex Molčan and Lucas Miedler, both in three sets. In the main draw, Tiafoe beat Dušan Lajović in the first round before winning his second match of the year against Tsitsipas, after recovering from a break down in the third set. Tiafoe then beat Diego Schwartzman to reach his first ATP 500 semifinal, where he beat Jannik Sinner after trailing in the second set to reach his first ATP 500 final. He would lose to Alexander Zverev in straight sets in the final.

=== 2022: US Open semifinal, top 20, American No. 2 ===
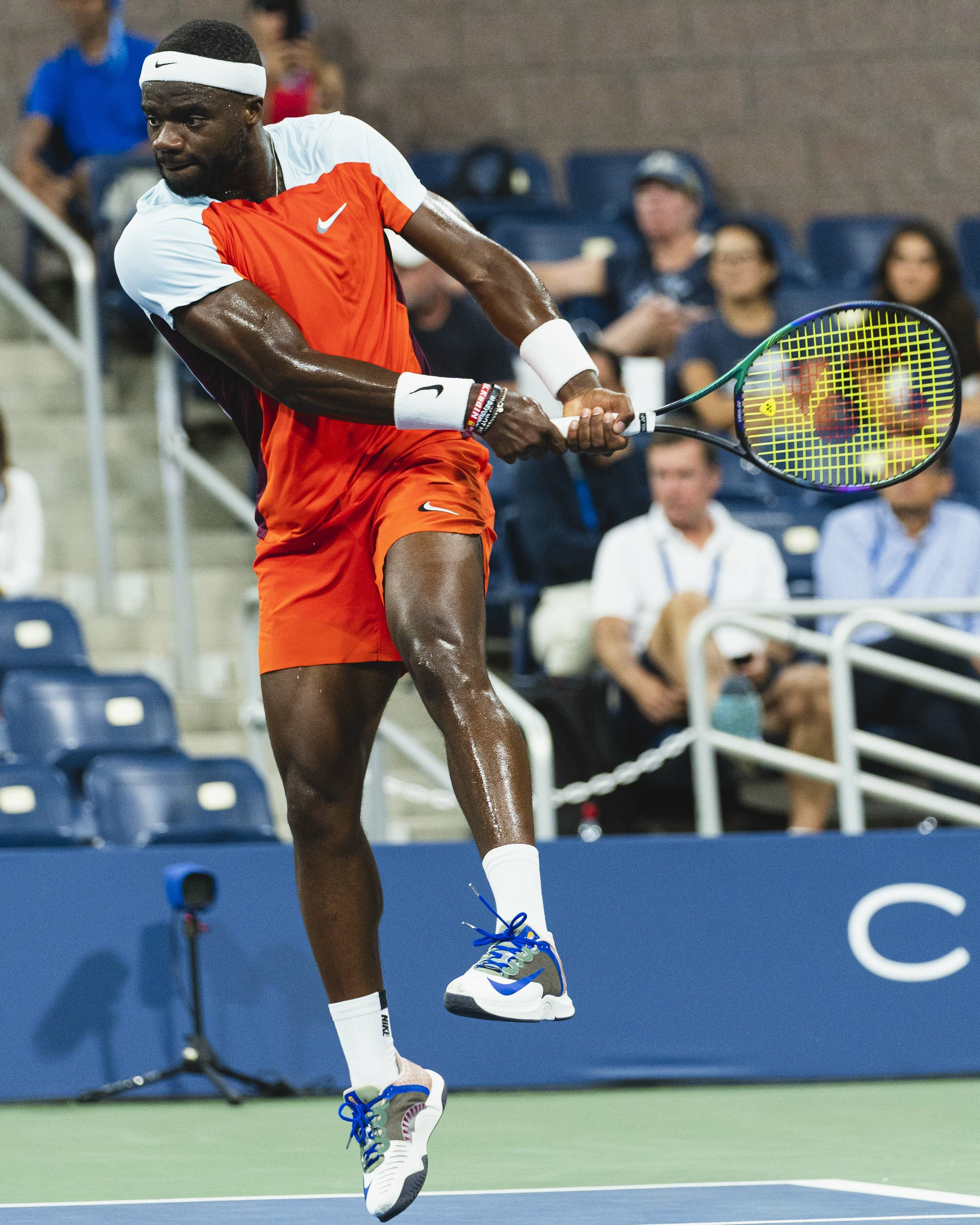
Tiafoe hits a jumping backhand during the 2022 US Open

Tiafoe saw success in the European Clay swing of the season. At the Portugal Open, he defeated Monte-Carlo finalist Alejandro Davidovich Fokina in the quarterfinals and Sebastian Korda in the semifinals. He lost to Sebastián Báez in the final, but reached the top 25 in rankings on May 2, 2022. In his next event, the Madrid Open, Tiafoe lost to Cristian Garín in the first round. Tiafoe, who had played in the French Open six times previously, recorded his first victory at Roland Garros in 2022 with a first-round win over Benjamin Bonzi. In the second round, he lost to David Goffin in four sets. At the Wimbledon Championships, he reached the round of 16 for the first time at this major. He lost again to Goffin this time, in a tight five-set match that lasted 4 hours and 36 minutes.

At the Atlanta Open, Tiafoe reached the semifinals where he lost to Jenson Brooksby in straight sets. In his next event, at his home tournament of Washington, Tiafoe reached the quarterfinals, but let five match points slip away and lost to Nick Kyrgios in three sets. At the same tournament, he also reached the semifinals in doubles with Alex De Minaur. The next week, at the Canadian Open, Tiafoe reached the second round with a win over Benjamin Bonzi before losing to No. 10 seed Taylor Fritz. His win against Bonzi lifted him to a then-career-high ranking of No. 24, which also made him the No. 2 American player. At the Cincinnati Masters, Tiafoe reached the second round with a win over No. 12 seed Matteo Berrettini.

Tiafoe reached the fourth round of the US Open after defeating 14th seed Diego Schwartzman in the third round. In the fourth round, he recorded the biggest win of his career over No. 2 seed Rafael Nadal to reach the quarterfinals. With his win over the 22-time Grand Slam champion, he became the first American to defeat Nadal at a Major since wildcard James Blake at the 2005 US Open. At age 24, he also became the youngest American man to reach the US Open quarterfinals since Andy Roddick in 2006. He was only the third American to defeat Nadal in a Grand Slam after Roddick (2004) and Blake (2005). Next, he defeated No. 9 seed Andrey Rublev to reach his first major semifinal in his career, becoming the first American man to reach the semifinals in Flushing Meadows since 2006 when Andy Roddick reached the championship match, and the first black American man since Arthur Ashe in 1972. In the semifinals, Tiafoe lost to Carlos Alcaraz in a five set hard-fought match lasting more than four hours. He saved a match point against him in the fourth set, after coming back from two sets to one down, but lost in the decider.

Tiafoe then participated in the Laver Cup, defeating Stefanos Tsitsipas to seal the victory for Team World.

=== 2023: United Cup champion, two titles, top 10 ===
Tiafoe started the season at the inaugural United Cup, as the No. 2 American male player, where the United States team became champion by defeating Italy in the final.

He reached the top 15 following the Australian Open where he reached the third round.

At Indian Wells, Tiafoe reached his first Masters 1000 semifinal, defeating Marcos Giron, Jason Kubler, qualifier Alejandro Tabilo, and 2021 Indian Wells champion Cameron Norrie (the biggest win of his season by ranking), all without dropping a set, before losing to fifth seed Daniil Medvedev. At the Miami Open, he was defeated by Lorenzo Sonego in the third round.

Tiafoe reached his sixth final and won his first title outside hard courts at the U.S. Men's Clay Court Championships. Due to multiple rain delays, he played and won four matches all in straight sets over the course of two days, defeating Gijs Brouwer in less than an hour in the semifinal and Tomás Martín Etcheverry in the final. This tournament victory moved him to world No. 11 on April 10, 2023.

In May, Tiafoe competed at the French Open as the No. 12 seed and reached the third round of this Major for the first time, losing to No. 22 and eventual semifinalist Alexander Zverev in four sets.

During the grass court season, Tiafoe reached his seventh final and first on grass at the Stuttgart Open, defeating Jiří Lehečka, sixth seed Lorenzo Musetti, and Marton Fucsovics along the way. In the final, he defeated Jan-Lennard Struff after saving a championship point in the final-set tiebreak. Tiafoe reached the world's top 10 for the first time in his career on June 19, 2023. With his titles on clay and on grass during the season, he completed the set of titles on three different surfaces. Seeded 10th at Wimbledon, his highest career Grand Slam seeding, he reached the third round, losing to 21st seed Grigor Dimitrov in straight sets.

At the US Open, Tiafoe lost in the quarterfinals to compatriot Ben Shelton in four sets.

=== 2024: US Open semifinal, Cincinnati final ===
Tiafoe reached the semifinals at his home tournament, the Delray Beach Open, losing to third seed and compatriot Tommy Paul, the eventual runner-up. At the Miami Open he lost in the second round to Australian Christopher O'Connell, having received a bye at the tournament.

At the U.S. Men's Clay Court Championships, where he was the defending champion, Tiafoe defeated James Duckworth, Jordan Thompson, and Luciano Darderi en route to his eighth career final and fourth on clay. He lost to top seed Ben Shelton in the first all-African-American men's singles tennis final in the Open Era.

During the American Summer swing, he reached the semifinals for the first time in Washington upsetting top seed Andrey Rublev, his first top 10 win of the season, and first since 2022, before losing to eventual champion and fourth seed Sebastian Korda. Next he also reached the semifinals in Cincinnati for only the second time in his career at a Masters level, with wins over Alejandro Davidovich Fokina, 14th seed Lorenzo Musetti, Jiří Lehečka, winning on the sixth match point, and finally fifth seed Hubert Hurkacz by retirement, his 200th career win. He was the first American male player in the Cincinnati semifinals since John Isner in 2017. He reached his first Masters and biggest final of his career with a three-set stunning defeat of 15th seed Holger Rune, coming from behind in the third set and saving two match points, but he lost in straight sets to Jannik Sinner.

At the US Open he reached a third consecutive quarterfinal with wins over Aleksandar Kovacevic, Alexander Shevchenko, 13th seed Ben Shelton in five sets, and 28th Alexei Popyrin in four sets, joining American players Pete Sampras, Andre Agassi and Andy Roddick in achieving the milestone. He reached the semifinals for the second time after the retirement of tenth seed Grigor Dimitrov in the fourth set, setting up an all all-American semifinal with Taylor Fritz, the first at a Grand Slam since 2005 at the US Open, when Andre Agassi and Robby Ginepri met. He would go on to lose in 5 sets.

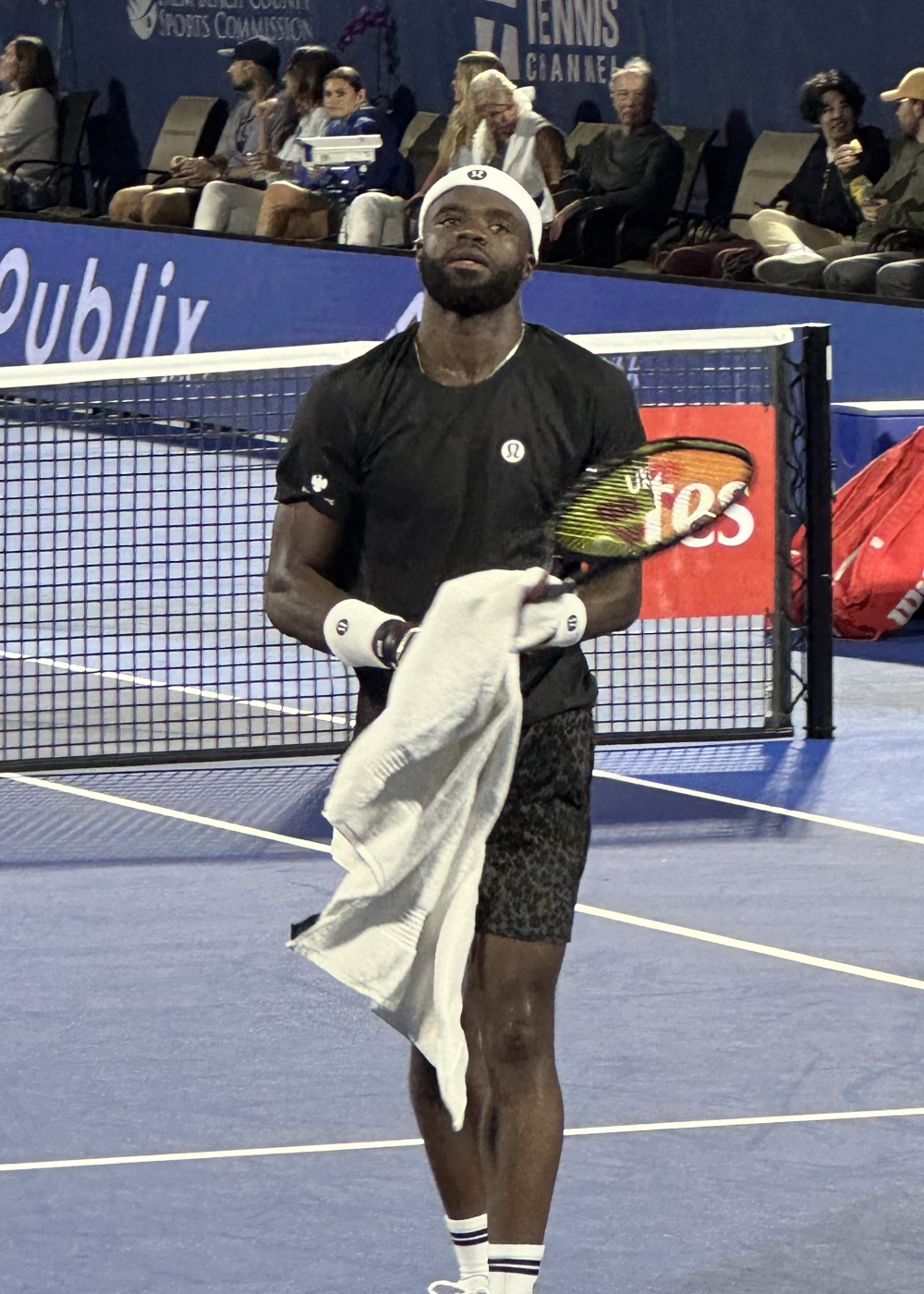
Frances Tiafoe at the 2026 Delray Beach Open

After the US Open, Tiafoe went through a tough period on the tour, with a record of three wins and five losses before ending his season following the Paris Masters. This slump included a confrontation with chair umpire Jimmy Pinoargote during the Shanghai Masters. Following his second round loss to Roman Safiullin, Tiafoe verbally abused the umpire after receiving several warnings during the match for exceeding the time allowed to serve. In November, the ATP fined him a total of $120,000 for his actions, $60,000 for verbal abuse and $60,000 for aggravated behaviour.

=== 2025: French Open quarterfinal ===
In the first round of the Australian Open, Tiafoe struggled against Arthur Rinderknech, eventually winning in five sets despite throwing up during the fourth set. He was defeated by Fábián Marozsán in five sets, losing in the second round of the Australian Open for the second straight season.He defeated Alex Michelsen in a five set thriller to reach the 2026 US Open Men’s Singles Semifinals.

At the French Open, Tiafoe defeated Roman Safiullin, Pablo Carreno Busta, 23rd seed Sebastian Korda and Daniel Altmaier, without dropping a set, to reach his first quarterfinal at Roland Garros. As a result he returned to No. 13 in the singles rankings on June 9, 2025.

=== 2026: Cincinnati final, US Open semifinal, world No. 8, ATP Finals debut ===
Tiafoe reached his first final of the year in Acapulco as the 8th seed, losing to Flavio Cobolli in the final in straight sets. His success continued into the sunshine double, where he reached the fourth round of Indian Wells and his fifth Masters 1000 quarterfinal in Miami. He capped off the first North American swing of the year by reaching the semifinals in Houston.

Tiafoe won his fourth title in Halle, beating top 10 players Flavio Cobolli, Felix Auger-Aliassime and Taylor Fritz on his way there. He reached the third round of Wimbledon.

Tiafoe's success on American soil continued. He reached his second Masters 1000 final in Cincinnati, again upsetting Auger-Aliassime before losing to Arthur Fils in three sets in the final. At the US Open, Tiafoe defeated Martin Damm in five sets before beating Rei Sakamoto, Valentin Vacherot and world no. 8 Daniil Medvedev in straight sets to reach his fourth US Open quarterfinal. There, he came back from a two set deficit to defeat Alex Michelsen and reach his third US Open semifinal, which he lost to Ben Shelton in four sets. His performance in the US Open gave Tiafoe a career-high ranking of world No. 8 on 14 September 2026.

Ranked at career-high of No. 8, Tiafoe qualified for the first time at the 2026 ATP Finals on 9 November 2026. He won against Cobolli, but lost his other round-robin matches against Carlos Alcaraz and Daniil Medvedev and was thus eliminated in the round-robin stage.

== World TeamTennis ==
Tiafoe has played three seasons of World TeamTennis, all with his hometown team the Washington Kastles, making his debut in 2017. He was to return to the Kastles during the 2020 WTT season, but did not play after testing positive for COVID-19.

== Playing style ==
Like many of his top-ranked American contemporaries such as Jack Sock and Sam Querrey, Tiafoe plays an aggressive offensive game that relies on a big serve and powerful forehand. At 6 feet 2 inches tall, Tiafoe can launch serves at over 140 mph, and regularly hits first serves between 120 and 140 mph. After facing him at the 2016 US Open, John Isner said that Tiafoe could return his serve — widely regarded as one of the best in the game — as well as any player on tour outside of Novak Djokovic. He also said that Tiafoe's second serve could use improvement. Tiafoe's most unusual shot is his forehand, which carries heavy topspin and is driven by an unusual arm motion. When Tiafoe won the 2018 Delray Beach Open, he credited an improved serve for his better play in the tournament.

== Coaches ==
From age 8 to 17, Tiafoe was coached at the Junior Tennis Champions Center in Maryland by Misha Kouznetsov, who had played college tennis at UMBC and coached tennis at Robert Morris. Kouznetsov left his job at the JTCC to work with Tiafoe full-time. After Tiafoe moved to Florida to train with the USTA, he was coached by José Higueras from Spain, who had led fellow Americans Michael Chang and Jim Courier to Grand Slam titles. Tiafoe also worked with Nicolás Todero while at USTA.

Robby Ginepri, a former US Open semifinalist, began coaching Tiafoe in the fall of 2016. Tiafoe's friend Zack Evenden started to help coach him shortly before he won his first ATP title in 2018. Evenden took over as Tiafoe's primary coach before the start of the 2019 season.

In the 2020 season, Tiafoe hired former top-10 player Wayne Ferreira as an additional coach. In July 2021, Tiafoe and Evenden parted ways by mutual agreement, and Ferreira became his primary coach. In December 2023, Tiafoe parted with Ferreira and reunited with former USTA coach Diego Moyano.

In July 2024 Tiafoe hired David Witt; the two parted ways in October 2025. The team shakeup also included parting ways with his five-year coach Jordi Arconada. Since January 2026 he has been coached by Dr. Mark Kovacs, a physiologist and biomechanics researcher.

== Equipment and apparel ==
Starting in January 2025, Tiafoe is sponsored by lululemon and is a brand ambassador for them. Tiafoe was previously sponsored by Nike since May 2016. He was also previously sponsored by Adidas. Tiafoe endorses the Yonex PERCEPT 97 tennis racket equipped with Polytour Pro 125 strings. He chose this racket because it helps him "play more aggressively".

== Personal life ==
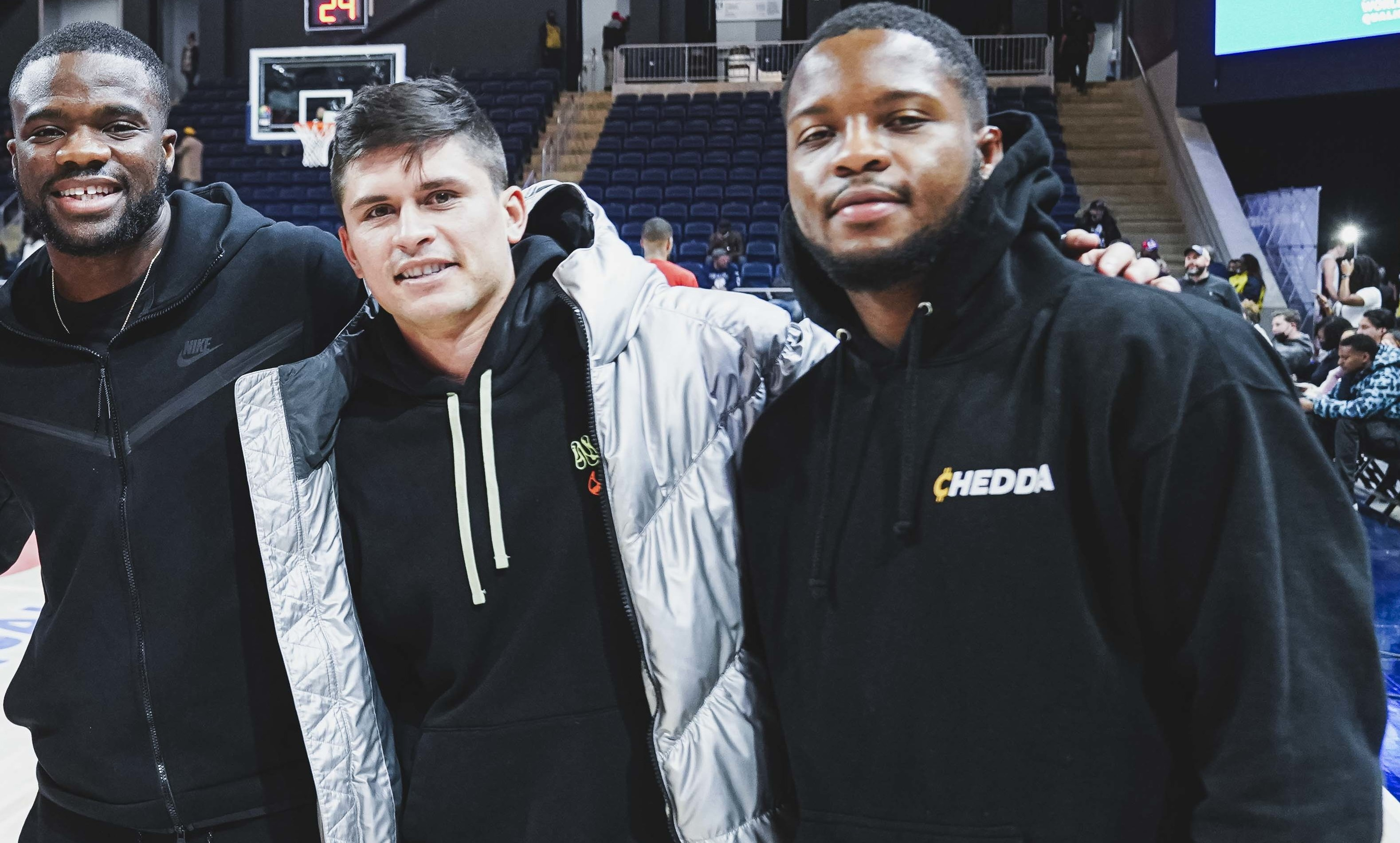
Frances (left) with pro tennis player Jordi Arconada (center) and his brother Franklin (right)

Tiafoe made known his relationship with former tennis player turned social media influencer Ayan Broomfield in 2018.

His tennis idol growing up was Juan Martín del Potro, in part because the Argentine was the first pro to sign a tennis ball for him. The two first faced each other at Acapulco in 2017, with del Potro winning the match in a third-set tiebreak. Tiafoe picked up his first win over his idol at the 2018 Delray Beach Open en route to his first career ATP title.

Tiafoe likes to watch and play basketball, and is a big fan of fellow Washington, D.C. area native Kevin Durant. He is also a fan of Washington area sports teams, including the Washington Spirit in the National Women's Soccer League, Washington Mystics in the Women's National Basketball Association, Washington Wizards in the National Basketball Association, Washington Commanders in the National Football League, and the Washington Capitals in the National Hockey League.

Due to Tiafoe's connections to the Junior Tennis Champions Center (JTCC) in College Park, Maryland, and his childhood in Hyattsville, Maryland, many fans of the University of Maryland Terrapins are also fans of Tiafoe. Tiafoe is regularly covered by University of Maryland Media and Fan Sites. After Tiafoe defeated Rafael Nadal and reached the semifinals of the US Open in 2022, he attended a Maryland Terrapins football game where he was honored for his accomplishments. Tiafoe also attends Maryland Terrapins Basketball games. Tiafoe has a long-term relationship with University of Maryland Football coach Mike Locksley, whom he met as a teenager, and has appeared on Locksley's podcast.

Tiafoe has embraced his position both as one of the few players of color on the ATP Tour and as a potential role model to youngsters in general, saying, "That's one of my biggest motivations – to get more black people playing tennis... But I'm just trying to inspire everyone, doesn't matter what race... especially younger people."

Tiafoe played in the 2023 NBA Celebrity All-Star Game.

== Career statistics ==
=== Grand Slam performance timelines ===
Key
W	F	SF	QF	#R	RR	Q#	P#	DNQ	A	Z#	PO	G	S	B	NMS	NTI	P	NH

(W) winner; (F) finalist; (SF) semifinalist; (QF) quarterfinalist; (#R) rounds 4, 3, 2, 1; (RR) round-robin stage; (Q#) qualification round; (P#) preliminary round; (DNQ) did not qualify; (A) absent; (Z#) Davis/Fed Cup Zonal Group (with number indication) or (PO) play-off; (G) gold, (S) silver or (B) bronze Olympic/Paralympic medal; (NMS) not a Masters tournament; (NTI) not a Tier I tournament; (P) postponed; (NH) not held; (SR) strike rate (events won / competed); (W–L) win–loss record.
To avoid confusion and double counting, these charts are updated at the conclusion of a tournament or when the player's participation has ended.

==== Singles ====
Current through the 2026 US Open.

Tournament	2014	2015	2016	2017	2018	2019	2020	2021	2022	2023	2024	2025	2026	SR	W–L	Win %
Australian Open	A	A	Q2	2R	1R	QF	1R	2R	2R	3R	2R	2R	3R	0 / 10	13–10	57%
French Open	A	1R	Q3	1R	1R	1R	1R	1R	2R	3R	2R	QF	4R	0 / 11	11–11	50%
Wimbledon	A	A	Q1	2R	3R	1R	NH	3R	4R	3R	3R	2R	3R	0 / 9	15–9	63%
US Open	Q1	1R	1R	1R	2R	2R	4R	4R	SF	QF	SF	3R	SF	0 / 12	29–12	71%
Win–loss	0–0	0–2	0–1	2–4	3–4	5–4	3–3	6–4	10–4	10–4	9–4	8–4	12–4	0 / 42	68–42	62%

==== Doubles ====
Tournament	2014	2015	2016	2017	2018	2019	2020	2021	2022	2023	2024	2025	2026	SR	W–L
Australian Open	A	A	A	A	1R	A	1R	3R	1R	A	A	A		0 / 4	2–4
French Open	A	A	A	1R	1R	A	1R	2R	2R	A	1R	A		0 / 6	1–6
Wimbledon	A	A	A	1R	1R	A	NH	A	A	A	A			0 / 2	0–2
US Open	2R	A	A	A	A	A	A	1R	1R	A	A			0 / 3	1–3
Win–loss	1–1	0–0	0–0	0–2	0–3	0–0	0–2	3–3	0–3	0–0	0–0			0 / 14	4–14

=== ATP Masters 1000 finals ===
==== Singles: 2 (2 runner-up) ====
Result	Year	Tournament	Surface	Opponent	Score
Loss	2024	Cincinnati Open	Hard	(Italy) Jannik Sinner	6–7^{(4–7)}, 2–6
Loss	2026	Cincinnati Open	Hard	(France) Arthur Fils	3–6, 6–1, 0–6

Awards
Preceded by (South Africa) Kevin Anderson	Arthur Ashe Humanitarian of the Year; 2020	Succeeded by (New Zealand) Marcus Daniell
