= 2017 Delray Beach Open =

- Date: February 20–26
- Edition: 25th
- Category: World Tour 250
- Draw: 32S / 16D
- Prize money: $534,625
- Surface: Hard / outdoor
- Location: Delray Beach, United States

Champions

Singles
- (United States) Jack Sock

Doubles
- (South Africa) Raven Klaasen / (United States) Rajeev Ram
- Delray Beach Open

The 2017 Delray Beach Open was a professional men's tennis tournament played on outdoor hard courts. It was the 25th edition of the tournament, and was part of the World Tour 250 series of the 2017 ATP World Tour. It took place in Delray Beach, United States between February 20 and February 26, 2017. Third-seeded Jack Sock won the singles title.

== Finals ==
=== Singles ===
- (United States) Jack Sock defeated (Canada) Milos Raonic, walkover

=== Doubles ===
- (South Africa) 'Raven Klaasen / (United States) Rajeev Ram defeated (Philippines) Treat Huey / (Belarus) Max Mirnyi, 7–5, 7–5

== Singles main-draw entrants ==
=== Seeds ===
| Country | Player | Rank^{1} | Seed |
|---|---|---|---|
| CAN | Milos Raonic | 4 | 1 |
| CRO | Ivo Karlović | 20 | 2 |
| USA | Jack Sock | 21 | 3 |
| USA | Sam Querrey | 29 | 4 |
| USA | Steve Johnson | 30 | 5 |
| AUS | Bernard Tomic | 32 | 6 |
| ARG | Juan Martín del Potro | 36 | 7 |
| GBR | Kyle Edmund | 49 | 8 |

- ^{1} Rankings as of February 13, 2017

=== Other entrants ===
The following players received wildcards into the main draw:

- (United States) Bjorn Fratangelo
- (United States) Stefan Kozlov
- (United States) Sam Querrey

The following players received entry from the qualifying draw:

- (Belgium) Kimmer Coppejans
- (Belgium) Steve Darcis
- (Japan) Akira Santillan
- (United States) Tim Smyczek

=== Withdrawals ===
Before the tournament

- (United Kingdom) Daniel Evans →replaced by (United States) Taylor Fritz
- (United States) Ryan Harrison →replaced by (Moldova) Radu Albot
- (Australia) Thanasi Kokkinakis →replaced by (Kazakhstan) Mikhail Kukushkin
- (Czech Republic) Adam Pavlásek →replaced by (Georgia (country)) Nikoloz Basilashvili

During the tournament

- (Belgium) Steve Darcis

== Doubles main-draw entrants ==
=== Seeds ===
| Country | Player | Country | Player | Rank^{1} | Seed |
|---|---|---|---|---|---|
| USA | Bob Bryan | USA | Mike Bryan | 6 | 1 |
| RSA | Raven Klaasen | USA | Rajeev Ram | 27 | 2 |
| PHI | Treat Huey | BLR | Max Mirnyi | 45 | 3 |
| AUT | Oliver Marach | FRA | Fabrice Martin | 69 | 4 |

- ^{1} Rankings are as of February 13, 2017.

=== Other entrants ===
The following pairs received wildcards into the main draw:

- (Canada) Philip Bester / (Canada) Peter Polansky
- (United States) Bjorn Fratangelo / (United States) Taylor Fritz
