= 2004 Millennium International Tennis Championships – Singles =

Singles
- 2004 Millennium International Tennis Championships

Final
- Champion: (Brazil) Ricardo Mello
- Runner-up: (United States) Vincent Spadea
- Score: 7–6^{(7–2)}, 6–3

Details
- Draw: 32
- Seeds: 8

Events
Singles	Doubles
← 2003 ·	Delray Beach Open	· 2005 →

Ricardo Mello defeated Vincent Spadea 7–6^{(7–2)}, 6–3 to win the 2004 Millennium International Tennis Championships singles event. Jan-Michael Gambill was the defending champion.

== Seeds ==
1. (United States) Vincent Spadea (final)
2. (United States) Mardy Fish (second round)
3. (Croatia) Mario Ančić (semifinals)
4. (Belgium) Xavier Malisse (first round)
5. (Croatia) Ivo Karlović (first round)
6. (France) Cyril Saulnier (first round)
7. (Belarus) Max Mirnyi (first round)
8. (Czech Republic) Radek Štěpánek (first round)

== Draw ==
=== Key ===
- Q = Qualifier
- WC = Wild card
- LL = Lucky loser
- Alt = Alternate
- SE = Special exempt
- PR = Protected ranking
- ITF = ITF entry
- JE = Junior exempt
- w/o = Walkover
- r = Retired
- d = Defaulted
- SR = Special ranking

=== Finals ===
Semifinals
1	(United States) Vincent Spadea	6	6
(United States) Jeff Salzenstein	1	3
3	(Croatia) Mario Ančić	6^{2}	3
(Brazil) Ricardo Mello	7^{7}	6

Final
1	(United States) Vincent Spadea	6^{2}	3
(Brazil) Ricardo Mello	7^{7}	6

=== Top half ===
First round
1	(United States) V Spadea	4	7	6
(Colombia) A Falla	6	5	1
(United States) J Blake	4	6	6
WC	(United States) A Bohane	6	3	2
(United States) J Morrison	6	6
WC	(United States) T Widom	4	3
Q	(United States) H Armando	3	7^{7}	7^{7}
7	(Belarus) M Mirnyi	6	6^{5}	6^{4}
4	(Belgium) X Malisse	5	6	1
(United Kingdom) G Rusedski	7	4	6
(United States) R Kendrick	3	2
Q	(United States) M Boeker	6	6
(Switzerland) M Chiudinelli	5	7^{7}	2
(United States) J Salzenstein	7	6^{4}	6
(United States) P Goldstein	4	6	7^{7}
5	(Croatia) I Karlović	6	3	6^{4}

Second round
1	(United States) V Spadea	6	6
(United States) J Blake	3	1
(United States) J Morrison	6^{4}	3
Q	(United States) H Armando	7^{7}	6
(United Kingdom) G Rusedski	6	6
Q	(United States) M Boeker	3	4
(United States) J Salzenstein	6	2	6
(United States) P Goldstein	2	6	1

Quarterfinals
1	(United States) V Spadea	6	1	6
Q	(United States) H Armando	3	6	4
(United Kingdom) G Rusedski	4	6^{7}
(United States) J Salzenstein	6	7^{9}

Semifinals
1	(United States) V Spadea	6	6
(United States) J Salzenstein	1	3

=== Bottom half ===
First round
6	(France) C Saulnier	6	4	5
(Denmark) K Carlsen	2	6	7
(Germany) B Phau	4	6	6
WC	(United States) W Odesnik	6	3	0
(Chile) A García	6	2	3
Q	(United States) A Delic	2	6	6
(United States) J Gambill	3	4
3	(Croatia) M Ančić	6	6
8	(Czech Republic) R Štěpánek	7^{9}	6^{1}	1
(France) S de Chaunac	6^{7}	7^{7}	6
(France) J Golmard	7	3	6
(Belgium) D Norman	5	6	4
(Brazil) R Mello	6	6
(Belgium) G Elseneer	1	4
Q	(United States) A Pedroso	1	2
2	(United States) M Fish	6	6

Second round
(Denmark) K Carlsen	5	6	6
(Germany) B Phau	7	4	2
Q	(United States) A Delic	1	3
3	(Croatia) M Ančić	6	6
(France) S de Chaunac	3	2
(France) J Golmard	6	6
(Brazil) R Mello	5	6	6
2	(United States) M Fish	7	4	4

Quarterfinals
(Denmark) K Carlsen	2	5
3	(Croatia) M Ančić	6	7
(France) J Golmard	7^{7}	3	3
(Brazil) R Mello	6^{2}	6	6

Semifinals
3	(Croatia) M Ančić	6^{2}	3
(Brazil) R Mello	7^{7}	6
