= 2005 Millennium International Tennis Championships – Singles =

Singles
- 2005 Millennium International Tennis Championships

Final
- Champion: (Belgium) Xavier Malisse
- Runner-up: (Czech Republic) Jiří Novák
- Score: 7–6^{(8–6)}, 6–2

Details
- Draw: 32
- Seeds: 8

Events
Singles	Doubles
← 2004 ·	Delray Beach Open	· 2006 →

Xavier Malisse defeated Jiří Novák 7–6^{(8–6)}, 6–2 to win the 2005 Millennium International Tennis Championships singles event. Ricardo Mello was the defending champion.

== Seeds ==
1. (United States) Vincent Spadea (semifinals)
2. (Czech Republic) Jiří Novák (final)
3. (Belgium) Xavier Malisse (champion)
4. (France) Cyril Saulnier (first round)
5. (Brazil) Ricardo Mello (second round)
6. (Georgia (country)) ~~Irakli Labadze~~ (withdrew)
7. (Denmark) Kenneth Carlsen (quarterfinals)
8. (United States) Kevin Kim (quarterfinals)

== Draw ==
=== Key ===
- Q = Qualifier
- WC = Wild card
- LL = Lucky loser
- Alt = Alternate
- SE = Special exempt
- PR = Protected ranking
- ITF = ITF entry
- JE = Junior exempt
- w/o = Walkover
- r = Retired
- d = Defaulted
- SR = Special ranking

=== Finals ===
Semifinals
1	(United States) Vincent Spadea	5	4
3	(Belgium) Xavier Malisse	7	6
(South Africa) Wesley Moodie	3	3
2	(Czech Republic) Jiří Novák	6	6

Final
3	(Belgium) Xavier Malisse	7^{8}	6
2	(Czech Republic) Jiří Novák	6^{6}	2

=== Top half ===
First round
1	(United States) V Spadea	6	6
(United States) H Armando	2	3
(United States) J Blake	6	2	2
Q	(Russia) T Gabashvili	4	6	6
(France) O Mutis	6^{6}	7^{7}	3
WC	(United States) T Widom	7^{8}	6^{4}	6
(Canada) F Dancevic	4	1
8	(United States) K Kim	6	6
3	(Belgium) X Malisse	6	4	7
(United States) J Morrison	2	6	5
(Croatia) R Karanušić	2	6	3
(Argentina) J Guzmán	6	3	6
Q	(China) P Sun	6	6
Q	(United States) M Boeker	3	4
(United States) G Weiner	2	1
LL	(Paraguay) R Delgado	6	6

Second round
1	(United States) V Spadea	4	7	6
Q	(Russia) T Gabashvili	6	5	3
WC	(United States) T Widom	2	3
8	(United States) K Kim	6	6
3	(Belgium) X Malisse	6	3	6
(Argentina) J Guzmán	4	6	1
Q	(China) P Sun	7^{8}	1	1
LL	(Paraguay) R Delgado	6^{6}	6	6

Quarterfinals
1	(United States) V Spadea	7	6^{0}	6
8	(United States) K Kim	5	7^{7}	4
3	(Belgium) X Malisse	6	6
LL	(Paraguay) R Delgado	2	2

Semifinals
1	(United States) V Spadea	5	4
3	(Belgium) X Malisse	7	6

=== Bottom half ===
First round
5	(Brazil) R Mello	7^{7}	6
(Czech Republic) T Zíb	6^{4}	3
(United States) J Salzenstein	5	2
(South Africa) W Moodie	7	6
(Netherlands) P Wessels	6	6
(Netherlands) D van Scheppingen	2	4
(United States) J Gambill	7	3	6
4	(France) C Saulnier	5	6	4
7	(Denmark) K Carlsen	7	6
WC	(United States) E Nunez	5	4
Q	(United States) B Vahaly	7	6
(United States) R Kendrick	5	4
(Germany) P Kohlschreiber	6	6
WC	(United States) W Odesnik	3	4
(United States) A Delic	4	3
2	(Czech Republic) J Novák	6	6

Second round
5	(Brazil) R Mello	4	4
(South Africa) W Moodie	6	6
(Netherlands) P Wessels	6	6^{3}	6
(United States) J Gambill	4	7^{7}	3
7	(Denmark) K Carlsen	2	7^{7}	6
Q	(United States) B Vahaly	6	6^{5}	3
(Germany) P Kohlschreiber	2	1
2	(Czech Republic) J Novák	6	6

Quarterfinals
(South Africa) W Moodie	5
(Netherlands) P Wessels	0^{r}
7	(Denmark) K Carlsen	3	5
2	(Czech Republic) J Novák	6	7

Semifinals
(South Africa) W Moodie	3	3
2	(Czech Republic) J Novák	6	6
