= 2007 Delray Beach International Tennis Championships =

- Date: January 27 – February 4
- Edition: 15th
- Category: International Series
- Draw: 24S (RR) / 16D / 16Q
- Prize money: US$416,000
- Surface: Hard (Plexicushion)
- Location: Delray Beach, Florida, United States

Champions

Singles
- (Belgium) Xavier Malisse

Doubles
- (United States) Hugo Armando / (Belgium) Xavier Malisse
← 2006 ·	Delray Beach Open	· 2008 →

The 2007 Delray Beach International Tennis Championships was a men's professional tennis event on the 2007 ATP Tour in Delray Beach, Florida, United States, held from January 27 to February 4. Xavier Malisse won the title, an ATP International Series level tournament. Xavier Malisse won the singles title.

This was the third tournament of the season (alongside Adelaide, Viña del Mar, Buenos Aires and Las Vegas) that implemented a 24-player Round robin tournament for the singles competition, as part of the round-robin trials proposed during this season.

== Singles main-draw entrants ==
=== Seeds ===
Country	Player	Rank^{1}	Seed
USA	James Blake	5	1
GER	Tommy Haas	12	2
BEL	Xavier Malisse	30	3
GER	Benjamin Becker	57	4
GER	Florian Mayer	58	5
GER	Philipp Kohlschreiber	61	6
ESP	Guillermo García López	65	7
USA	Vincent Spadea	71	8

- Rankings are as of January 22, 2007.

=== Other entrants ===
The following players received wildcards into the main draw:

- (United States) Jan-Michael Gambill
- (United States) Michael Russell
- (United States) Ryan Sweeting

The following players received entry from the qualifying draw:

- (United States) Scoville Jenkins
- (United States) Jesse Levine
- (Ukraine) Sergiy Stakhovsky
- (Serbia) Dušan Vemić

== Doubles main-draw entrants ==
=== Seeds ===
Country	Player	Country	Player	Rank^{1}	Seed
RSA	Jeff Coetzee	NED	Rogier Wassen	93	1
USA	Eric Butorac	USA	Travis Parrott	131	2
POL	Łukasz Kubot	ROM	Andrei Pavel	137	3
GBR	James Auckland	AUS	Stephen Huss	139	4

- ^{1} Rankings are as of January 22, 2007.

=== Other entrants ===
The following pairs received wildcards into the main draw:

- (Greece) Konstantinos Economidis / (Russia) Teymuraz Gabashvili
- (United States) Jan-Michael Gambill / (Germany) Rainer Schüttler

== Finals ==
=== Singles ===
(Belgium) Xavier Malisse defeated (United States) James Blake, 5–7, 6–4, 6–4

- It was Malisse's 2nd title of the year and the 3rd and final title on his career.

=== Doubles ===
(United States) Hugo Armando / (Belgium) Xavier Malisse defeated (United Kingdom) James Auckland / (Australia) Stephen Huss, 6–3, 6–7^{(4–7)}, [10–5]

- It was the only title of his career for Armando, and the 2nd title of the year and the 4th of his career for Malisse.
