= 2008 Delray Beach International Tennis Championships – Doubles =

Doubles
- 2008 Delray Beach International Tennis Championships

Final
- Champions: (Belarus) Max Mirnyi; (United Kingdom) Jamie Murray
- Runners-up: (United States) Bob Bryan; (United States) Mike Bryan
- Score: 6–4, 3–6, [10–6]

Events
Singles	Doubles
← 2007 ·	Delray Beach Open	· 2009 →

Hugo Armando and Xavier Malisse were the defending champions, but lost in the first round to Bob Bryan and Mike Bryan.

Max Mirnyi and Jamie Murray won in the final 6–4, 3–6, [10–6], against Bob Bryan and Mike Bryan.

== Seeds ==
1. (United States) Bob Bryan / (United States) Mike Bryan (final)
2. (Belarus) Max Mirnyi / (United Kingdom) Jamie Murray (champions)
3. (United States) Eric Butorac / (Australia) Todd Perry (first round)
4. (Russia) Igor Kunitsyn / (United States) Jim Thomas (first round)

== Draw ==
=== Key ===
- Q = Qualifier
- WC = Wild card
- LL = Lucky loser
- Alt = Alternate
- SE = Special exempt
- PR = Protected ranking
- ITF = ITF entry
- JE = Junior exempt
- w/o = Walkover
- r = Retired
- d = Defaulted
- SR = Special ranking

=== Draw ===
First round

Quarterfinals

Semifinals

Final

1
- (United States) B Bryan
- (United States) M Bryan
6
7^{7}

WC
- (United States) H Armando
- (Belgium) X Malisse
3
6^{3}

1
- (United States) B Bryan
- (United States) M Bryan
6
6

- (United States) A Delić
- (United States) R Ram
1
7^{7}
[5]

- (Pakistan) A-u-H Qureshi
- (United States) B Reynolds
4
4

- (Pakistan) A-u-H Qureshi
- (United States) B Reynolds
6
6^{3}
[10]

1
- (United States) B Bryan
- (United States) M Bryan
7
4
[10]

3
- (United States) E Butorac
- (Australia) T Perry
6
5
[5]

- (United States) M Fish
- (The Bahamas) M Knowles
5
6
[5]

- (United States) M Fish
- (The Bahamas) M Knowles
1
7
[10]

- (United States) M Fish
- (The Bahamas) M Knowles
6
6

- (United States) V Spadea
- (United States) D Young
4
2

- (United States) S Lipsky
- (United States) D Martin
3
4

- (United States) S Lipsky
- (United States) D Martin
6
6

1
- (United States) B Bryan
- (United States) M Bryan
4
6
[6]

- (United States) R Kendrick
- (United States) S Querrey
6
7

2
- (Belarus) M Mirnyi
- (United Kingdom) J Murray
6
3
[10]

WC
- (United States) J Blake
- (United States) K Jones
3
5

- (United States) R Kendrick
- (United States) S Querrey
6^{5}
4

- (Australia) S Huss
- (United States) A Kuznetsov
4
7^{10}
[10]

- (Australia) S Huss
- (United States) A Kuznetsov
7^{7}
6

4
- (Russia) I Kunitsyn
- (United States) J Thomas
6
6^{8}
[8]

- (Australia) S Huss
- (United States) A Kuznetsov
5
1

- (Germany) B Becker
- (Czech Republic) J Levinský
3
4

2
- (Belarus) M Mirnyi
- (United Kingdom) J Murray
7
6

- (Romania) V Hănescu
- (United Kingdom) R Hutchins
6
6

- (Romania) V Hănescu
- (United Kingdom) R Hutchins
6
4
[5]

- (Spain) G García López
- (France) F Serra
6
6^{5}
[9]

2
- (Belarus) M Mirnyi
- (United Kingdom) J Murray
3
6
[10]

2
- (Belarus) M Mirnyi
- (United Kingdom) J Murray
3
7^{7}
[11]
