= 2006 Delray Beach International Tennis Championships =

Tennis tournament

- Date: January 30 – February 6
- Edition: 14th
- Category: International Series
- Draw: 32S / 16D
- Prize money: $355,000
- Location: Delray Beach, Florida, U.S.
- Venue: Delray Beach Tennis Center

Champions

Singles
- (Germany) Tommy Haas

Doubles
- (The Bahamas) Mark Knowles / (Canada) Daniel Nestor
← 2005 ·	Delray Beach Open	· 2007 →

The 2006 Delray Beach International Tennis Championships was an ATP men's tennis tournament held in Delray Beach, Florida in the United States. The tournament was held from January 30 to February 6.

== Finals ==
=== Singles ===
(Germany) Tommy Haas defeated (Belgium) Xavier Malisse 6–3, 3–6, 7–6^{(7–5)}

- It was Haas' 1st title of the year and the 8th of his career.

=== Doubles ===
(The Bahamas) Mark Knowles / (Canada) Daniel Nestor defeated (South Africa) Chris Haggard / (South Africa) Wesley Moodie 6–2, 6–3

- It was Knowles' 1st title of the year and the 40th of his career. It was Nestor's 1st title of the year and the 42nd of his career.
