= 2005 Millennium International Tennis Championships =

- Date: January 31 – February 7
- Edition: 13th
- Category: International Series
- Draw: 32S / 16D
- Prize money: $355,000
- Location: Delray Beach, Florida, U.S.
- Venue: Delray Beach Tennis Center

Champions

Singles
- (Belgium) Xavier Malisse

Doubles
- (Sweden) Simon Aspelin / (Australia) Todd Perry
← 2004 ·	Delray Beach Open	· 2006 →

The 2005 Millennium International Tennis Championships was an ATP men's tennis tournament held in Delray Beach, Florida, United States that was part of the International Series of the 2005 ATP Tour. It was the 13th edition of the tournament and was held from January 31 to February 7. Third-seeded Xavier Malisse won the singles title.

== Finals ==
=== Singles ===
(Belgium) Xavier Malisse defeated (Czech Republic) Jiří Novák 7–6^{(8–6)}, 6–2

- It was Malisse's first singles title of the year and of his career.

=== Doubles ===
(Sweden) Simon Aspelin / (Australia) Todd Perry defeated (Australia) Jordan Kerr / (United States) Jim Thomas 6–3, 6–3

- It was Aspelin's 1st title of the year and the 4th of his career. It was Perry's 1st title of the year and the 2nd of his career.
