= 2004 Millennium International Tennis Championships – Doubles =

Doubles
- 2004 Millennium International Tennis Championships

Final
- Champions: (India) Leander Paes (Czech Republic) Radek Štěpánek
- Runners-up: (Argentina) Gastón Etlis (Argentina) Martín Rodríguez
- Score: 6–0, 6–3

Events
Singles	Doubles
← 2003 ·	Delray Beach Open	· 2005 →

Leander Paes and Nenad Zimonjić were the defending champions, but Zimonjić did not participate this year.

Paes and Radek Štěpánek won in the final 6–0, 6–3, against Gastón Etlis and Martín Rodríguez.

== Seeds ==
1. (Argentina) Gastón Etlis / (Argentina) Martín Rodríguez (final)
2. (India) Leander Paes / (Czech Republic) Radek Štěpánek (champions)
3. (Argentina) Martín García / (Argentina) Sebastián Prieto (first round)
4. (South Africa) Chris Haggard / (South Africa) Robbie Koenig (first round)

== Draw ==
=== Key ===
- Q = Qualifier
- WC = Wild card
- LL = Lucky loser
- Alt = Alternate
- SE = Special exempt
- PR = Protected ranking
- ITF = ITF entry
- JE = Junior exempt
- w/o = Walkover
- r = Retired
- d = Defaulted
- SR = Special ranking

=== Draw ===
First round
1	(Argentina) G Etlis (Argentina) M Rodríguez	6	6
(France) S de Chaunac (France) C Saulnier	3	2
(United States) A Delic (Belarus) M Mirnyi	7	3	2
(Chile) A García (Brazil) R Mello	5	6	6
3	(Argentina) M García (Argentina) S Prieto	6^{9}	4
WC	(United States) M Fish (United States) K Jones	7^{11}	6
(Spain) E Benfele Álvarez (France) J Golmard	2	4
(Belgium) X Malisse (The Bahamas) M Merklein	6	6
(United States) R Leach (United States) B MacPhie	4	6	7
(South Africa) J Coetzee (United States) T Parrott	6	3	5
(Australia) J Kerr (United States) J Thomas	6	6
4	(South Africa) C Haggard (South Africa) R Koenig	3	4
(Denmark) K Carlsen (Croatia) I Karlović	6	6
(United States) J-M Gambill (United States) V Spadea	3	4
WC	(United States) J Blake (United States) J Morrison	2	4
2	(India) L Paes (Czech Republic) R Štěpánek	6	6

Quarterfinals
1	(Argentina) G Etlis (Argentina) M Rodríguez	6	6^{6}	7^{7}
(Chile) A García (Brazil) R Mello	3	7^{8}	6^{1}
WC	(United States) M Fish (United States) K Jones	6	3	2
(Belgium) X Malisse (The Bahamas) M Merklein	3	6	6
(United States) R Leach (United States) B MacPhie	4	6	6
(Australia) J Kerr (United States) J Thomas	6	3	4
(Denmark) K Carlsen (Croatia) I Karlović	4	6^{6}
2	(India) L Paes (Czech Republic) R Štěpánek	6	7^{8}

Semifinals
1	(Argentina) G Etlis (Argentina) M Rodríguez	6^{5}	7^{8}	6
(Belgium) X Malisse (The Bahamas) M Merklein	7^{7}	6^{6}	4
(United States) R Leach (United States) B MacPhie	4	5
2	(India) L Paes (Czech Republic) R Štěpánek	6	7

Final
1	(Argentina) G Etlis (Argentina) M Rodríguez	0	3
2	(India) L Paes (Czech Republic) R Štěpánek	6	6
