= 2013 Bob and Mike Bryan tennis season =

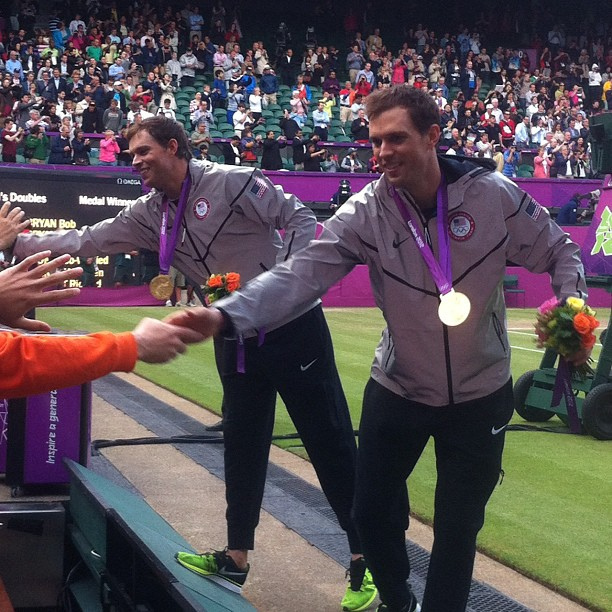
- The Bryans are pictured together at the 2012 Olympics
- Full name: Bob Bryan; Mike Bryan
- Country: United States
- Calendar prize money: $1,307,358

Singles
- Current ranking: No. 1
- Ranking change from previous year: Mike Bryan; Bob Bryan ▲

Grand Slam & significant results
- Australian Open: W
- French Open: W
- Wimbledon: W
- US Open: SF

Doubles
- Season record: 54-7 (88.52%)
- Calendar titles: 10
- Current ranking: No. 1
- Ranking change from previous year: Steady

Davis Cup
- Davis Cup: Team Lost Quarterfinal World Group
- Last updated on: 05:40, 21 August 2013 (UTC).

The 2013 Bob and Mike Bryan tennis season officially commenced on 31 December 2012 with the start of the 2013 ATP World Tour. However, they did not choose to compete until a week later at Apia International Sydney, which started on January 7, 2013.

== Year in detail ==
=== Early Hardcourt events ===
==== Australian Open ====
The Bryans further cemented their legacy in tennis history at the season's first Grand Slam event, the Australian Open. Their victory in Melbourne was their 13th Grand Slam men's doubles title, the all-time record for a men's doubles team. They had previously been tied with Australians John Newcombe and Tony Roche.

=== Clay court events ===
==== French Open ====
They claimed their 14th Grand Slam win at the French Open, which just happened to be their second at the event, but in the interim had three final appearances.

=== Grass court events ===
==== Wimbledon ====
The Bryans won their 15th Grand Slam title, becoming the first men's doubles team ever in the Open era to hold all four Grand Slam titles at the same time.

== All matches ==
This table chronicles all the matches of Bob and Mike Bryan in 2013, including walkovers (W/O) which the ATP does not count as wins. They are marked ND for non-decision or no decision.

Key
W	F	SF	QF	#R	RR	Q#	P#	DNQ	A	Z#	PO	G	S	B	NMS	NTI	P	NH

(W) winner; (F) finalist; (SF) semifinalist; (QF) quarterfinalist; (#R) rounds 4, 3, 2, 1; (RR) round-robin stage; (Q#) qualification round; (P#) preliminary round; (DNQ) did not qualify; (A) absent; (Z#) Davis/Fed Cup Zonal Group (with number indication) or (PO) play-off; (G) gold, (S) silver or (B) bronze Olympic/Paralympic medal; (NMS) not a Masters tournament; (NTI) not a Tier I tournament; (P) postponed; (NH) not held; (SR) strike rate (events won / competed); (W–L) win–loss record.
To avoid confusion and double counting, these charts are updated at the conclusion of a tournament or when the player's participation has ended.

=== Doubles matches ===
Tournament	Match	Round	Opponents (seed or key)	Ranks	Result	Score
Apia International Sydney; Sydney, Australia; ATP 250; Hard, outdoor 7 – 12 January 2013
Apia International Sydney; Sydney, Australia; ATP 250; Hard, outdoor 7 – 12 January 2013	1	1R	(Colombia) Juan Sebastián Cabal / (Poland) Marcin Matkowski	#47 / #16	Win	6–4, 5–7, [11–9]
Apia International Sydney; Sydney, Australia; ATP 250; Hard, outdoor 7 – 12 January 2013	2	QF	(France) Julien Benneteau / (France) Michaël Llodra	#99 / #33	Win	6–3, 6–2
Apia International Sydney; Sydney, Australia; ATP 250; Hard, outdoor 7 – 12 January 2013	3	SF	(Spain) Marcel Granollers / (Spain) Marc López (3)	#10 / #6	Win	7–5, 6–3
Apia International Sydney; Sydney, Australia; ATP 250; Hard, outdoor 7 – 12 January 2013	4	W	(Belarus) Max Mirnyi / (Romania) Horia Tecău (4)	#7 / #9	Win (1)	6–4, 6–4
Australian Open; Melbourne, Australia; Grand Slam tournament Hard, outdoor 14 – 27 January 2013
Australian Open; Melbourne, Australia; Grand Slam tournament Hard, outdoor 14 – 27 January 2013	5	1R	(Austria) Oliver Marach / (Argentina) Horacio Zeballos	#54 / #63	Win	7–5, 6–3
Australian Open; Melbourne, Australia; Grand Slam tournament Hard, outdoor 14 – 27 January 2013	6	2R	(Italy) Flavio Cipolla / (Italy) Andreas Seppi	#315 / #92	Win	6–3, 6–4
Australian Open; Melbourne, Australia; Grand Slam tournament Hard, outdoor 14 – 27 January 2013	7	3R	(France) Jérémy Chardy / (Poland) Łukasz Kubot	#77 / #38	Win	6–7^{(4–7)}, 6–4, 6–3
Australian Open; Melbourne, Australia; Grand Slam tournament Hard, outdoor 14 – 27 January 2013	8	QF	(Italy) Daniele Bracciali / (Czech Republic) Lukáš Dlouhý	#24 / #84	Win	6–3, 7–5
Australian Open; Melbourne, Australia; Grand Slam tournament Hard, outdoor 14 – 27 January 2013	9	SF	(Italy) Simone Bolelli / (Italy) Fabio Fognini	#278 / #110	Win	6–4, 4–6, 6–1
Australian Open; Melbourne, Australia; Grand Slam tournament Hard, outdoor 14 – 27 January 2013	10	W	(Netherlands) Robin Haase / (Netherlands) Igor Sijsling	#152 / #327	Win (2)	6–3, 6–4
Davis Cup, First Round; Jacksonville, United States; Davis Cup; Hard, indoor 1 – 3 February 2013
Davis Cup, First Round; Jacksonville, United States; Davis Cup; Hard, indoor 1 – 3 February 2013	11	1R; R3	(Brazil) Marcelo Melo / (Brazil) Bruno Soares	#16 / #19	Win	6–7^{(6–8)}, 7–6^{(9–7)}, 4–6, 6–3, 3–6
SAP Open; San Jose, United States; ATP 250; Hard, indoor 11 – 17 February 2013
SAP Open; San Jose, United States; ATP 250; Hard, indoor 11 – 17 February 2013	12	1R	(United States) Steve Johnson / (United States) Jack Sock	#169 / #252	Win	7–6^{(7–3)}, 7–6^{(7–5)}
SAP Open; San Jose, United States; ATP 250; Hard, indoor 11 – 17 February 2013	13	QF	(Australia) Lleyton Hewitt / (Australia) Marinko Matosevic	#270 / #197	Loss	4–6, 7–6^{(7–4)}, [7–10]
US National Indoor Tennis C'ships; Memphis, United States; ATP 500; Hard, indoor 18 – 24 February 2013
US National Indoor Tennis C'ships; Memphis, United States; ATP 500; Hard, indoor 18 – 24 February 2013	14	1R	(Colombia) Robert Farah / (Germany) Tommy Haas	#58 / #430	Win	6–1, 6–1
US National Indoor Tennis C'ships; Memphis, United States; ATP 500; Hard, indoor 18 – 24 February 2013	15	QF	(Mexico) Santiago González / (United States) Scott Lipsky	#37 / #29	Win	7–5, 6–4
US National Indoor Tennis C'ships; Memphis, United States; ATP 500; Hard, indoor 18 – 24 February 2013	16	SF	(Austria) Alexander Peya / (Brazil) Bruno Soares (4)	#23 / #19	Win	6–3, 7–6^{(7–3)}
US National Indoor Tennis C'ships; Memphis, United States; ATP 500; Hard, indoor 18 – 24 February 2013	17	W	(United States) James Blake / (United States) Jack Sock (WC)	#154 / #294	Win (3)	6–1, 6–2
BNP Paribas Open; Indian Wells, United States; ATP 1000; Hard, outdoor 4 – 17 March 2013
BNP Paribas Open; Indian Wells, United States; ATP 1000; Hard, outdoor 4 – 17 March 2013	18	1R	(Croatia) Marin Čilić / (Israel) Jonathan Erlich	#57 / #52	Win	6–2, 7–5
BNP Paribas Open; Indian Wells, United States; ATP 1000; Hard, outdoor 4 – 17 March 2013	19	2R	(United States) John Isner / (United States) Sam Querrey	#118 / #51	Win	6–3, 6–3
BNP Paribas Open; Indian Wells, United States; ATP 1000; Hard, outdoor 4 – 17 March 2013	20	QF	(Poland) Łukasz Kubot / (Serbia) Janko Tipsarević	#25 / #74	Win	6–7^{(4–7)}, 6–4, [10–7]
BNP Paribas Open; Indian Wells, United States; ATP 1000; Hard, outdoor 4 – 17 March 2013	21	SF	(Mexico) Santiago González / (United States) Scott Lipsky	#37 / #30	Win	6–4, 4–6, [11–9]
BNP Paribas Open; Indian Wells, United States; ATP 1000; Hard, outdoor 4 – 17 March 2013	22	W	(Philippines) Treat Huey / (Poland) Jerzy Janowicz	#36 / #136	Win (4)	6–3, 3–6, [10–6]
Sony Open Tennis; Miami, United States; ATP 1000; Hard, outdoor 18 – 31 March 2013
Sony Open Tennis; Miami, United States; ATP 1000; Hard, outdoor 18 – 31 March 2013	23	1R	(Belarus) Max Mirnyi / (Russia) Mikhail Youzhny	#7 / #113	Loss	4–6, 6–2, [5–10]
Davis Cup, Quarterfinals; Boise, United States; Davis Cup; Hard, indoor 5 – 7 April 2013
Davis Cup, Quarterfinals; Boise, United States; Davis Cup; Hard, indoor 5 – 7 April 2013	24	QF; R3	(Serbia) Ilija Bozoljac / (Serbia) Nenad Zimonjić	#1150 / #22	Loss	6–7^{(5–7)}, 6–7^{(1–7)}, 7–5, 6–4, 13–15
US Men's Clay Court C'ships; Houston, United States; ATP 250; Clay, outdoor 8 – 14 April 2013
US Men's Clay Court C'ships; Houston, United States; ATP 250; Clay, outdoor 8 – 14 April 2013	25	1R	(Austria) Oliver Marach / (Brazil) André Sá	#52 / #86	Win	6–0, 6–1
US Men's Clay Court C'ships; Houston, United States; ATP 250; Clay, outdoor 8 – 14 April 2013	26	QF	(Germany) Philipp Marx / (Romania) Florin Mergea	#71 / #69	Win	7–5, 6–2
US Men's Clay Court C'ships; Houston, United States; ATP 250; Clay, outdoor 8 – 14 April 2013	27	SF	(Sweden) Johan Brunström / (Canada) Jesse Levine	#55 / #192	Win	6–3, 6–4
US Men's Clay Court C'ships; Houston, United States; ATP 250; Clay, outdoor 8 – 14 April 2013	28	F	(United Kingdom) Jamie Murray / (Australia) John Peers	#84 / #70	Loss (1)	6–1, 6–7^{(3–7)}, [10–12]
Monte Carlo Rolex Masters; Monte Carlo, Monaco; ATP 1000; Clay, outdoor 15 – 21 April 2013
Monte Carlo Rolex Masters; Monte Carlo, Monaco; ATP 1000; Clay, outdoor 15 – 21 April 2013	–	1R	Bye			
Monte Carlo Rolex Masters; Monte Carlo, Monaco; ATP 1000; Clay, outdoor 15 – 21 April 2013	29	2R	(Germany) Philipp Kohlschreiber / (Germany) Florian Mayer	#222 / #139	Win	6–3, 6–2
Monte Carlo Rolex Masters; Monte Carlo, Monaco; ATP 1000; Clay, outdoor 15 – 21 April 2013	30	QF	(Austria) Jürgen Melzer / (India) Leander Paes	#30 / #13	Win	4–6, 6–3, [10–5]
Monte Carlo Rolex Masters; Monte Carlo, Monaco; ATP 1000; Clay, outdoor 15 – 21 April 2013	31	SF	(Canada) Milos Raonic / (Australia) Bernard Tomic	#188 / #548	Win	6–3, 6–3
Monte Carlo Rolex Masters; Monte Carlo, Monaco; ATP 1000; Clay, outdoor 15 – 21 April 2013	32	F	(France) Julien Benneteau / (Serbia) Nenad Zimonjić	#88 / #22	Loss (2)	6–4, 6–7^{(4–7)}, [12–14]
Mutua Madrid Open; Madrid, Spain; ATP 1000; Clay, outdoor 6 – 12 May 2013
Mutua Madrid Open; Madrid, Spain; ATP 1000; Clay, outdoor 6 – 12 May 2013	–	1R	Bye			
Mutua Madrid Open; Madrid, Spain; ATP 1000; Clay, outdoor 6 – 12 May 2013	33	2R	(United States) John Isner / (United States) Sam Querrey	#437 / #109	Win	7–6^{(7–6)}, 7–5
Mutua Madrid Open; Madrid, Spain; ATP 1000; Clay, outdoor 6 – 12 May 2013	34	QF	(Germany) Tommy Haas / (Czech Republic) Radek Štěpánek	#218 / #16	Win	7–6^{(7–2)}, 6–3
Mutua Madrid Open; Madrid, Spain; ATP 1000; Clay, outdoor 6 – 12 May 2013	35	SF	(France) Jérémy Chardy / (Poland) Łukasz Kubot	#89 / #25	Win	6–3, 6–7^{(1–7)}, [10–4]
Mutua Madrid Open; Madrid, Spain; ATP 1000; Clay, outdoor 6 – 12 May 2013	36	W	(Austria) Alexander Peya / (Brazil) Bruno Soares (7)	#18 / #14	Win (5)	6–2, 6–3
Internazionali BNL d'Italia; Rome, Italy; ATP 1000; Clay, outdoor 13 – 19 May 2013
Internazionali BNL d'Italia; Rome, Italy; ATP 1000; Clay, outdoor 13 – 19 May 2013	–	1R	Bye			
Internazionali BNL d'Italia; Rome, Italy; ATP 1000; Clay, outdoor 13 – 19 May 2013	37	2R	(Italy) Paolo Lorenzi / (Italy) Potito Starace (WC)	#129 / #63	Win	6–1, 6–4
Internazionali BNL d'Italia; Rome, Italy; ATP 1000; Clay, outdoor 13 – 19 May 2013	38	QF	(Spain) David Marrero / (Spain) Fernando Verdasco	#20 / #25	Win	6–4, 7–5
Internazionali BNL d'Italia; Rome, Italy; ATP 1000; Clay, outdoor 13 – 19 May 2013	39	SF	(Belarus) Max Mirnyi / (Romania) Horia Tecău (5)	#13 / #7	Win	6–4, 6–7^{(2–7)}, [10–3]
Internazionali BNL d'Italia; Rome, Italy; ATP 1000; Clay, outdoor 13 – 19 May 2013	40	W	(India) Mahesh Bhupathi / (India) Rohan Bopanna (6)	#10 / #12	Win (6)	6–2, 6–3
French Open; Paris, France; Grand Slam tournament Clay, outdoor 27 May – 9 June 2013
French Open; Paris, France; Grand Slam tournament Clay, outdoor 27 May – 9 June 2013	41	1R	(France) Jonathan Eysseric / (France) Fabrice Martin (WC)	#388 / #317	Win	6–3, 6–4
French Open; Paris, France; Grand Slam tournament Clay, outdoor 27 May – 9 June 2013	42	2R	(United States) Eric Butorac / (United States) Jack Sock	#42 / #93	Win	7–5, 7–6^{(7–2)}
French Open; Paris, France; Grand Slam tournament Clay, outdoor 27 May – 9 June 2013	43	3R	(Germany) Christopher Kas / (Austria) Oliver Marach	#63 / #64	Win	1–0, retired
French Open; Paris, France; Grand Slam tournament Clay, outdoor 27 May – 9 June 2013	44	QF	(Spain) David Marrero / (Spain) Fernando Verdasco (8)	#20 / #23	Win	6–3, 6–4
French Open; Paris, France; Grand Slam tournament Clay, outdoor 27 May – 9 June 2013	45	SF	(Austria) Alexander Peya / (Brazil) Bruno Soares (7)	#14 / #13	Win	6–1, 6–4
French Open; Paris, France; Grand Slam tournament Clay, outdoor 27 May – 9 June 2013	46	W	(France) Michaël Llodra / (France) Nicolas Mahut	#45 / #70	Win (7)	6–4, 4–6, 7–6^{(7–4)}
Aegon Championships; London, United Kingdom; ATP 250; Grass, outdoor 10 – 16 June 2013
Aegon Championships; London, United Kingdom; ATP 250; Grass, outdoor 10 – 16 June 2013	–	1R	Bye			
Aegon Championships; London, United Kingdom; ATP 250; Grass, outdoor 10 – 16 June 2013	47	2R	(Spain) Guillermo García-López / (Australia) John-Patrick Smith (Alt)	#434 / #82	Win	7–6^{(7–2)}, 7–5
Aegon Championships; London, United Kingdom; ATP 250; Grass, outdoor 10 – 16 June 2013	48	QF	(United Kingdom) Jamie Murray / (Australia) John Peers (WC)	#67 / #61	Win	7–6^{(7–5)}, 6–7^{(9–11)}, [11–9]
Aegon Championships; London, United Kingdom; ATP 250; Grass, outdoor 10 – 16 June 2013	49	SF	(India) Mahesh Bhupathi / (India) Rohan Bopanna (3)	#7 / #10	Win	6–4, 6–2
Aegon Championships; London, United Kingdom; ATP 250; Grass, outdoor 10 – 16 June 2013	50	W	(Austria) Alexander Peya / (Brazil) Bruno Soares (4)	#9 / #6	Win (8)	4–6, 7–5, [10–3]
The Championships, Wimbledon; London, United Kingdom; Grand Slam tournament Grass, outdoor 24 June – 7 July 2013
The Championships, Wimbledon; London, United Kingdom; Grand Slam tournament Grass, outdoor 24 June – 7 July 2013	51	1R	(Brazil) Marcelo Demoliner / (Brazil) André Sá	#77 / #67	Win	6–4, 6–4, 6–1
The Championships, Wimbledon; London, United Kingdom; Grand Slam tournament Grass, outdoor 24 June – 7 July 2013	52	2R	(Spain) David Marrero / (Italy) Andreas Seppi	#16 / #82	Win	6–3, 7–5, 6–4
The Championships, Wimbledon; London, United Kingdom; Grand Slam tournament Grass, outdoor 24 June – 7 July 2013	53	3R	(Philippines) Treat Huey / (United Kingdom) Dominic Inglot (16)	#28 / #39	Win	7–5, 6–3, 7–6^{(7–3)}
The Championships, Wimbledon; London, United Kingdom; Grand Slam tournament Grass, outdoor 24 June – 7 July 2013	54	QF	(India) Mahesh Bhupathi / (Austria) Julian Knowle (8)	#7 / #27	Win	7–6^{(7–5)}, 7–6^{(7–3)}, 7–6^{(7–4)}
The Championships, Wimbledon; London, United Kingdom; Grand Slam tournament Grass, outdoor 24 June – 7 July 2013	55	SF	(India) Rohan Bopanna / (France) Édouard Roger-Vasselin (14)	#10 / #46	Win	6–7^{(4–7)}, 6–4, 6–3, 5–7, 6–3
The Championships, Wimbledon; London, United Kingdom; Grand Slam tournament Grass, outdoor 24 June – 7 July 2013	56	W	(Croatia) Ivan Dodig / (Brazil) Marcelo Melo (12)	#35 / #19	Win (9)	3–6, 6–3, 6–4, 6–4
Rogers Cup; Montreal, Canada; ATP 1000; Hard, outdoor 5 – 11 August 2013
Rogers Cup; Montreal, Canada; ATP 1000; Hard, outdoor 5 – 11 August 2013	–	1R	Bye			
Rogers Cup; Montreal, Canada; ATP 1000; Hard, outdoor 5 – 11 August 2013	57	2R	(Italy) Andreas Seppi / (Russia) Mikhail Youzhny	#76 / #96	Win	6–3, 6–4
Rogers Cup; Montreal, Canada; ATP 1000; Hard, outdoor 5 – 11 August 2013	58	QF	(Sweden) Robert Lindstedt / (Canada) Daniel Nestor (6)	#11 / #18	Loss	7–6^{(7–2)}, 3–6, [5–10]
Western & Southern Open; Cincinnati, United States; ATP 1000; Hard, outdoor 12 – 18 August 2013
Western & Southern Open; Cincinnati, United States; ATP 1000; Hard, outdoor 12 – 18 August 2013	–	1R	Bye			
Western & Southern Open; Cincinnati, United States; ATP 1000; Hard, outdoor 12 – 18 August 2013	–	2R	(France) Jérémy Chardy / (France) Richard Gasquet	#108 / #340	Walkover	N/A
Western & Southern Open; Cincinnati, United States; ATP 1000; Hard, outdoor 12 – 18 August 2013	59	QF	(United States) James Blake / (United States) Steve Johnson (WC)	#65 / #183	Win	6–2, 6–4
Western & Southern Open; Cincinnati, United States; ATP 1000; Hard, outdoor 12 – 18 August 2013	60	SF	(Mexico) Santiago González / (United States) Scott Lipsky	#30 / #29	Win	4–6, 7–6^{(8–6)}, [10–6]
Western & Southern Open; Cincinnati, United States; ATP 1000; Hard, outdoor 12 – 18 August 2013	61	W	(Spain) Marcel Granollers / (Spain) Marc López (2)	#8 / #7	Win (10)	6–4, 4–6, [10–4]
US Open; New York City, United States; Grand Slam tournament Hard, outdoor 26 August – 8 September 2013
US Open; New York City, United States; Grand Slam tournament Hard, outdoor 26 August – 8 September 2013	62	1R	(Argentina) Federico Delbonis / (Argentina) Leonardo Mayer	#202 / #228	Win	7–6^{(7–1)}, 6–2
US Open; New York City, United States; Grand Slam tournament Hard, outdoor 26 August – 8 September 2013	63	2R	(United States) Eric Butorac / (Denmark) Frederik Nielsen	#50 / #36	Win	6–3, 6–2
US Open; New York City, United States; Grand Slam tournament Hard, outdoor 26 August – 8 September 2013	64	3R	(Canada) Daniel Nestor / (Canada) Vasek Pospisil	#15 / #150	Win	6–7^{(1–7)}, 7–5, 6–2
US Open; New York City, United States; Grand Slam tournament Hard, outdoor 26 August – 8 September 2013	65	QF	(United Kingdom) Colin Fleming / (United Kingdom) Jonathan Marray (12)	#21 / #31	Win	7–6^{(9–7)}, 6–4
US Open; New York City, United States; Grand Slam tournament Hard, outdoor 26 August – 8 September 2013	66	SF	(India) Leander Paes / (Czech Republic) Radek Štěpánek (4)	#9 / #8	Loss	6–3, 3–6, 4–6
Japan Open Tennis Championships; Tokyo, Japan; ATP 500; Hard, outdoor 30 September – 6 October 2013
Japan Open Tennis Championships; Tokyo, Japan; ATP 500; Hard, outdoor 30 September – 6 October 2013	67	1R	(Spain) Nicolás Almagro / (Uruguay) Pablo Cuevas (PR)	#240 / #70	Loss	5–7, 6–1, [6–10]
Shanghai Rolex Masters; Shanghai, China; ATP 1000; Hard, outdoor 7 – 13 October 2013
Shanghai Rolex Masters; Shanghai, China; ATP 1000; Hard, outdoor 7 – 13 October 2013	–	1R	Bye			
Shanghai Rolex Masters; Shanghai, China; ATP 1000; Hard, outdoor 7 – 13 October 2013	68	2R	(Spain) Pablo Andújar / (Spain) Feliciano López	#160 / #128	Win	6–3, 6–2
Shanghai Rolex Masters; Shanghai, China; ATP 1000; Hard, outdoor 7 – 13 October 2013	69	QF	(Philippines) Treat Huey / (United Kingdom) Dominic Inglot	#27 / #30	Win	7–5, 7–6^{(7–4)}
Shanghai Rolex Masters; Shanghai, China; ATP 1000; Hard, outdoor 7 – 13 October 2013	70	SF	(Croatia) Ivan Dodig / (Brazil) Marcelo Melo (5)	#19 / #11	Loss	7–6^{(7–5)}, 5–7, [7–10]
Valencia Open 500; Valencia, Spain; ATP 500; Hard, indoor 21 – 27 October 2013
Valencia Open 500; Valencia, Spain; ATP 500; Hard, indoor 21 – 27 October 2013	71	1R	(Italy) Daniele Bracciali / (Italy) Fabio Fognini	#56 / #36	Win	6–4, 6–3
Valencia Open 500; Valencia, Spain; ATP 500; Hard, indoor 21 – 27 October 2013	72	QF	(Mexico) Santiago González / (United States) Scott Lipsky	#34 / #33	Win	6–4, 7–5
Valencia Open 500; Valencia, Spain; ATP 500; Hard, indoor 21 – 27 October 2013	73	SF	(Germany) Tommy Haas / (Brazil) André Sá	#117 / #71	Win	6–3, 6–4
Valencia Open 500; Valencia, Spain; ATP 500; Hard, indoor 21 – 27 October 2013	74	F	(Austria) Alexander Peya / (Brazil) Bruno Soares (2)	#4 / #3	Loss (3)	6–7^{(3–7)}, 7–6^{(7–1)}, [11–13]
BNP Paribas Masters; Paris, France; ATP 1000; Hard, indoor 28 October – 3 November 2013
BNP Paribas Masters; Paris, France; ATP 1000; Hard, indoor 28 October – 3 November 2013	–	1R	Bye			
BNP Paribas Masters; Paris, France; ATP 1000; Hard, indoor 28 October – 3 November 2013	75	2R	(Poland) Mariusz Fyrstenberg / (Poland) Marcin Matkowski	#22 / #19	Win	6–3, 5–7, [10–8]
BNP Paribas Masters; Paris, France; ATP 1000; Hard, indoor 28 October – 3 November 2013	76	QF	(Pakistan) Aisam-ul-Haq Qureshi / (Netherlands) Jean-Julien Rojer (8)	#14 / #14	Win	3–6, 6–3, [10–5]
BNP Paribas Masters; Paris, France; ATP 1000; Hard, indoor 28 October – 3 November 2013	77	SF	(Croatia) Ivan Dodig / (Brazil) Marcelo Melo (4)	#11 / #8	Win	6–4, 7–5
BNP Paribas Masters; Paris, France; ATP 1000; Hard, indoor 28 October – 3 November 2013	78	W	(Austria) Alexander Peya / (Brazil) Bruno Soares (2)	#4 / #3	Win (11)	6–3, 6–3
Barclays ATP World Tour Finals; London, United Kingdom; ATP Finals; Hard, indoor 4 – 11 November 2013
Barclays ATP World Tour Finals; London, United Kingdom; ATP Finals; Hard, indoor 4 – 11 November 2013	79	RR	(Croatia) Ivan Dodig / (Brazil) Marcelo Melo (3)	#6 / #5	Win	6–3, 3–6, [8–10]
Barclays ATP World Tour Finals; London, United Kingdom; ATP Finals; Hard, indoor 4 – 11 November 2013	80	RR	(Pakistan) Aisam-ul-Haq Qureshi / (Netherlands) Jean-Julien Rojer (5)	#15 / #15	Win	7–6^{(7–3)}, 1–6, [14–12]
Barclays ATP World Tour Finals; London, United Kingdom; ATP Finals; Hard, indoor 4 – 11 November 2013	81	RR	(Poland) Mariusz Fyrstenberg / (Poland) Marcin Matkowski (8)	#20 / #19	Win	4–6, 6–3, [10–5]
Barclays ATP World Tour Finals; London, United Kingdom; ATP Finals; Hard, indoor 4 – 11 November 2013	82	SF	(Austria) Alexander Peya / (Brazil) Bruno Soares (2)	#4 / #3	Win	4–6, 6–4, [10–8]
Barclays ATP World Tour Finals; London, United Kingdom; ATP Finals; Hard, indoor 4 – 11 November 2013	83	F	(Spain) David Marrero / (Spain) Fernando Verdasco (6)	#7 / #14	Loss (4)	5–7, 7–6^{(7–3)}, [7–10]

- Source for Bob (ATP)
- Source for Mike (ATP)

=== Mixed doubles matches ===
Bob

Tournament	Match	Round	Opponents (seed or key)	Ranks	Result	Score
Australian Open; Melbourne, Australia; Grand Slam tournament Hard, outdoor 14 – 27 January 2013; Partner: (India) Sania Mirza
Australian Open; Melbourne, Australia; Grand Slam tournament Hard, outdoor 14 – 27 January 2013; Partner: (India) Sania Mirza	1	1R	(Australia) Samantha Stosur / (Australia) Luke Saville (WC)	– / #535	Win	6–2, 6–2
Australian Open; Melbourne, Australia; Grand Slam tournament Hard, outdoor 14 – 27 January 2013; Partner: (India) Sania Mirza	2	2R	(United States) Abigail Spears / (United States) Scott Lipsky	#15 / #25	Win	4–6, 6–1, [10–4]
Australian Open; Melbourne, Australia; Grand Slam tournament Hard, outdoor 14 – 27 January 2013; Partner: (India) Sania Mirza	3	QF	(Czech Republic) Lucie Hradecká / (Czech Republic) František Čermák	#4 / #33	Loss	5–7, 4–6

Mike

Tournament	Match	Round	Opponents (seed or key)	Ranks	Result	Score
Australian Open; Melbourne, Australia; Grand Slam tournament Hard, outdoor 14 – 27 January 2013; Partner: (United States) Lisa Raymond
Australian Open; Melbourne, Australia; Grand Slam tournament Hard, outdoor 14 – 27 January 2013; Partner: (United States) Lisa Raymond	–	1R	(Czech Republic) Květa Peschke / (Poland) Marcin Matkowski	#17 / #16	Withdrew	N/A

== Tournament schedule ==
Date	Tournament	City	Category	Surface	2012 result	2012 points	2013 points	Outcome
Jan. 7–13	Apia International Sydney	Sydney (AUS)	ATP World Tour 250	Hard	W	250	250	Won against Max Mirnyi/Horia Tecău
Jan. 14–27	Australian Open	Melbourne (AUS)	Grand Slam	Hard	F	1200	2000	Won against Robin Haase/Igor Sijsling
Feb. 1–3	Davis Cup: United States vs Brazil	Jacksonville (USA)	Davis Cup	Hard (i)	DNS	0	0	First Round: USA def. BRA but Bryan's lost to Marcelo Melo/Bruno Soares
Feb. 11–17	SAP Open	San Jose (USA)	ATP World Tour 250	Hard (i)	A	0	45	QF loss against Lleyton Hewitt/Marinko Matosevic
Feb. 18–24	U.S. National Indoor Tennis Championships	Memphis (USA)	ATP World Tour 500	Hard (i)	A	0	500	Won against James Blake/Jack Sock
Feb. 25–Mar. 3	Delray Beach International Tennis Championships	Delray Beach (USA)	ATP World Tour 250	Hard	QF	45	0	DNS
Mar. 07–17	BNP Paribas Open	Indian Wells (USA)	ATP Masters 1000	Hard	QF	180	1000	Won against Treat Conrad Huey/Jerzy Janowicz
Mar. 20–31	Sony Open Tennis	Miami (USA)	ATP Masters 1000	Hard	SF	360	0	First Round loss against Max Mirnyi/Mikhail Youzhny
Apr.05–07	Davis Cup: USA vs Serbia	Boise (USA)	Davis Cup	Hard (i)	DNS	0	130	Quarterfinals: SRB def. USA and Bryan's lost to Ilija Bozoljac/Nenad Zimonjic
Apr 8–14	U.S. Men's Clay Court Championships	Houston (USA)	ATP World Tour 250	Hard	DNS	0	150	Final against Jamie Murray/John Peers
Apr.15–21	Monte-Carlo Rolex Masters	Monaco (MON)	ATP Masters 1000	Clay	W	1000	600	Final against Julien Benneteau/Nenad Zimonjic
Apr.22–28	Barcelona Open BancSabadell	Barcelona (ESP)	ATP World Tour 500	Clay	QF	90	0	DNS
May 5–12	Mutua Madrid Open	Madrid (ESP)	ATP Masters 1000	Clay	2R	0	1000	Won against Alexander Peya/Bruno Soares
May 12–19	Internazionali BNL d'Italia	Rome (ITA)	ATP Masters 1000	Clay	QF	180	1000	Won against Mahesh Bhupathi/Rohan Bopanna
May 20–26	Open de Nice Côte d’Azur	Nice (FRA)	ATP World Tour 250	Clay	W	250	0	DNS
May 26–Jun. 09	French Open	Paris (FRA)	Grand Slam	Clay	F	1200	2000	Won against Michaël Llodra/Nicolas Mahut
Jun. 10–16	AEGON Championships	London (GBR)	ATP World Tour 250	Grass	W	250	250	Won against Alexander Peya/Bruno Soares
Jun. 24–Jul. 07	Wimbledon	London (GBR)	Grand Slam	Grass	W	720	2000	Won against Ivan Dodig/Marcelo Melo
Aug.05–11	Rogers Cup	Montreal (CAN)	ATP Masters 1000	Hard	W	1000	180	QF loss against Robert Lindstedt/Daniel Nestor
Aug. 12–18	Western & Southern Open	Cincinnati (USA)	ATP Masters 1000	Hard	SF	360	1000	Won against Marcel Granollers/Marc López
Aug. 26–Sep. 09	US Open	New York City (USA)	Grand Slam	Hard	W	2000		
Sep. 30–Oct. 06	China Open	Beijing (CHN)	ATP World Tour 500	Hard	W	500		
Oct. 07–13	Shanghai Rolex Masters	Shanghai (CHN)	ATP Masters 1000	Hard	2R	0		
Oct. 28–Nov. 03	BNP Paribas Masters	Paris (FRA)	ATP Masters 1000	Hard (i)	2R	0		
November 4–10	ATP World Tour Finals	London (GBR)	ATP World Tour Finals	Hard (i)	RR	200		

- 2012 source
- 2013 source
- 2012 source
- 2013 source
