= 2008 Delray Beach International Tennis Championships – Singles =

Singles
- 2008 Delray Beach International Tennis Championships

Final
- Champion: (Japan) Kei Nishikori
- Runner-up: (United States) James Blake
- Score: 3–6, 6–1, 6–4

Details
- Draw: 32
- Seeds: 8

Events
Singles	Doubles
- Delray Beach Open

Xavier Malisse was the defending champion, but lost in the first round to Bobby Reynolds.

Kei Nishikori won his first ATP title at 3–6, 6–1, 6–4, against James Blake.

== Seeds ==
1. (United States) James Blake (final)
2. (Germany) Tommy Haas (first round)
3. (United States) Sam Querrey (semifinals)
4. (Israel) Dudi Sela (withdrew due to personal reasons)
5. (Germany) Florian Mayer (first round, retired due to a leg injury)
6. (United States) Vincent Spadea (quarterfinals)
7. (Romania) Victor Hănescu (withdrew due to illness)
8. (United States) Mardy Fish (quarterfinals)

== Draw ==
Key

- Q = Qualifier
- WC = Wild card
- LL = Lucky loser
- Alt = Alternate
- ITF = ITF entry
- PR = Protected ranking
- SR = Special ranking
- SE = Special exempt
- JE = Junior exempt
- JR = Junior Accelerator Programme entrant
- CO = College Accelerator Programme entrant
- NG = Next Gen Accelerator Program entrant
- w/o = Walkover
- r = Retired
- d = Defaulted

=== Finals ===
Semifinals
1	(United States) James Blake	6	6
WC	(United States) Robby Ginepri	4	4
3	(United States) Sam Querrey	6	2	6^{7}
Q	(Japan) Kei Nishikori	4	6	7^{9}

Final
1	(United States) James Blake	6	1	4
Q	(Japan) Kei Nishikori	3	6	6

=== Top half ===
First round
1	(United States) J Blake	7	7
(United States) R Kendrick	5	5
(Chile) P Capdeville	6	6
WC	(United States) C Bowles	2	4
(Russia) I Kunitsyn	6	7^{7}
(Germany) B Becker	3	6^{1}
Q	(Slovenia) L Gregorc	6^{5}	2
LL	(Belarus) M Mirnyi	7^{7}	6
LL	(United States) A Bogomolov, Jr.	1	0
(United States) M Russell	6	6
WC	(United States) R Ginepri	6	6
(France) M Montcourt	3	0
(Spain) I Navarro	6	3	6
(France) F Serra	3	6	3
Q	(Italy) M Crugnola	1	5
8	(United States) M Fish	6	7

Second round
1	(United States) J Blake	6	6
(Chile) P Capdeville	1	4
(Russia) I Kunitsyn	7^{7}	6
LL	(Belarus) M Mirnyi	6^{4}	3
(United States) M Russell	5	6	2
WC	(United States) R Ginepri	7	4	6
(Spain) I Navarro	6	5	3
8	(United States) M Fish	2	7	6

Quarterfinals
1	(United States) J Blake	6	6
(Russia) I Kunitsyn	2	4
WC	(United States) R Ginepri	6	4	6
8	(United States) M Fish	1	6	4

Semifinals
1	(United States) J Blake	6	6
WC	(United States) R Ginepri	4	4

=== Bottom half ===
First round
6	(United States) V Spadea	6	6
(Germany) D Gremelmayr	3	4
(Luxembourg) G Müller	7	7^{7}
WC	(United States) J Levine	5	6^{4}
(United States) W Odesnik	4	2
(Spain) G García López	6	6
(Kazakhstan) Y Schukin	1	4
3	(United States) S Querrey	6	6
5	(Germany) F Mayer	0	3^{r}
Q	(Japan) K Nishikori	6	4
(United States) D Young	6^{7}	3
Q	(United States) A Delic	7^{9}	6
(United States) B Reynolds	6	4	6
(Belgium) X Malisse	2	6	3
(Argentina) D Hartfield	6	3	6
2	(Germany) T Haas	2	6	2

Second round
6	(United States) V Spadea	7	4	6
(Luxembourg) G Müller	5	6	3
(Spain) G García López	4	7	4
3	(United States) S Querrey	6	5	6
Q	(Japan) K Nishikori	6^{7}	6	6
Q	(United States) A Delic	7^{9}	4	2
(United States) B Reynolds	7	2	7^{7}
(Argentina) D Hartfield	5	6	6^{3}

Quarterfinals
6	(United States) V Spadea	2	4
3	(United States) S Querrey	6	6
Q	(Japan) K Nishikori	6	6
(United States) B Reynolds	2	4

Semifinals
3	(United States) S Querrey	6	2	6^{7}
Q	(Japan) K Nishikori	4	6	7^{9}
