= 2013 SAP Open – Singles =

Singles
- 2013 SAP Open

Final
- Champion: (Canada) Milos Raonic
- Runner-up: (Germany) Tommy Haas
- Score: 6–4, 6–3

Details
- Draw: 28 (4Q / 3WC)
- Seeds: 8

Events
Singles	Doubles
← 2012 ·	Pacific Coast Championships

Milos Raonic was the two-time defending champion and won the title for the third year in a row, defeating Tommy Haas in the final 6–4, 6–3.

== Seeds ==
1. (Canada) Milos Raonic (champion)
2. (United States) John Isner (semifinals)
3. (United States) Sam Querrey (semifinals)
4. (Germany) Tommy Haas (final)
5. (Spain) Fernando Verdasco (first round)
6. (Uzbekistan) Denis Istomin (quarterfinals)
7. (Australia) Marinko Matosevic (second round)
8. (Belgium) Xavier Malisse (quarterfinals)

== Draw ==
=== Key ===
- Q = Qualifier
- WC = Wild card
- LL = Lucky loser
- Alt = Alternate
- SE = Special exempt
- PR = Protected ranking
- ITF = ITF entry
- JE = Junior exempt
- w/o = Walkover
- r = Retired
- d = Defaulted
- SR = Special ranking

=== Finals ===
Semifinals
1	(Canada) Milos Raonic	6	6
3	(United States) Sam Querrey	4	2
4	(Germany) Tommy Haas	6	6
2	(United States) John Isner	3	4

Final
1	(Canada) Milos Raonic	6	6
4	(Germany) Tommy Haas	4	3

=== Top half ===
First round
(United States) M Russell	6	7
Q	(United States) D Young	3	5
(Germany) B Becker	6^{3}	7	6
(United States) R Harrison	7^{7}	5	3
Q	(United States) R Sweeting	3	4
6	(Uzbekistan) D Istomin	6	6
(Slovenia) B Kavčič	6	4	6^{4}
(Australia) L Hewitt	3	6	7^{7}
(Italy) F Cipolla	6^{1}	6^{10}
(Colombia) A Falla	7^{7}	7^{12}
WC	(United States) J Sock	6^{5}	1
7	(Australia) M Matosevic	7^{7}	6

Second round
1	(Canada) M Raonic	6	7
(United States) M Russell	2	5
(Germany) B Becker	3	7^{7}	2
6	(Uzbekistan) D Istomin	6	6^{5}	6
3	(United States) S Querrey	7^{8}	1	7^{7}
(Australia) L Hewitt	6^{6}	6	6^{4}
(Colombia) A Falla	6	6
7	(Australia) M Matosevic	4	4

Quarterfinals
1	(Canada) M Raonic	7^{7}	6
6	(Uzbekistan) D Istomin	6^{0}	3
3	(United States) S Querrey	6	4	7
(Colombia) A Falla	3	6	5

Semifinals
1	(Canada) M Raonic	6	6
3	(United States) S Querrey	4	2

=== Bottom half ===
First round
5	(Spain) F Verdasco	3	3
Q	(United States) T Smyczek	6	6
(Croatia) I Karlović	7^{7}	4	6^{6}
WC	(United States) S Johnson	6^{2}	6	7^{8}
(Canada) J Levine	7	6
WC	(United States) B Klahn	5	2
8	(Belgium) X Malisse	6	3	6
(Japan) G Soeda	4	6	3
(Australia) M Ebden	6	7
Q	(South Africa) R de Voest	2	5
(Canada) V Pospisil	7	6
(Russia) E Donskoy	5	1

Second round
Q	(United States) T Smyczek	3	3
WC	(United States) S Johnson	6	6
(Canada) J Levine	3	1
4	(Germany) T Haas	6	6
8	(Belgium) X Malisse	5	7	7^{7}
(Australia) M Ebden	7	5	6^{1}
(Canada) V Pospisil	6^{3}	6	3
2	(United States) J Isner	7^{7}	2	6

Quarterfinals
WC	(United States) S Johnson	4	2
4	(Germany) T Haas	6	6
8	(Belgium) X Malisse	6^{8}	2
2	(United States) J Isner	7^{10}	6

Semifinals
4	(Germany) T Haas	6	6
2	(United States) J Isner	3	4

== Qualifying ==
=== Seeds ===
1. (United States) Tim Smyczek (qualified)
2. (Russia) Alex Bogomolov Jr. (qualifying competition)
3. (United States) Denis Kudla (qualifying competition)
4. (Ukraine) Illya Marchenko (qualifying competition)
5. (United States) Ryan Sweeting (qualified)
6. (Chinese Taipei) Jimmy Wang (first round)
7. (United States) Donald Young (qualified)
8. (Colombia) Robert Farah (second round)

=== Qualifiers ===
1. (United States) Tim Smyczek
2. (United States) Ryan Sweeting
3. (United States) Donald Young
4. (South Africa) Rik de Voest

=== Draw ===
==== First qualifier ====
First round
1	(United States) Tim Smyczek	6	6
(United States) William Boe-Wiegaard	2	4
(Germany) Robin Kern	5	3
(Ukraine) Denys Molchanov	7	6
(Canada) Érik Chvojka	7	6
(United States) Chase Buchanan	5	2
(United States) Nicolas Meister	6	6
6	(Chinese Taipei) Jimmy Wang	4	4

Second round
1	(United States) Tim Smyczek	6	2
(Ukraine) Denys Molchanov	3	1^{r}
(Canada) Érik Chvojka	6	6
(United States) Nicolas Meister	3	4

Qualifying competition
1	(United States) Tim Smyczek	6	3	7
(Canada) Érik Chvojka	4	6	5

==== Second qualifier ====
First round
2	(Russia) Alex Bogomolov Jr.	6	6
(France) Pierre-Hugues Herbert	4	4
(Zimbabwe) Takanyi Garanganga	4	3^{r}
(United States) Dennis Lajola	6	4
(United States) Greg Ouellette	6	6^{5}	6^{4}
(United States) Chris Wettengel	4	7^{7}	7^{7}
(Czech Republic) Marek Michalička	1	0
5	(United States) Ryan Sweeting	6	6

Second round
2	(Russia) Alex Bogomolov Jr.	6	6
(United States) Dennis Lajola	1	2
(United States) Chris Wettengel	0	4
5	(United States) Ryan Sweeting	6	6

Qualifying competition
2	(Russia) Alex Bogomolov Jr.	5	6	6^{4}
5	(United States) Ryan Sweeting	7	3	7^{7}

==== Third qualifier ====
First round
3	(United States) Denis Kudla	6	6
(United States) Denis Zivkovic	1	4
(United States) Daniel Kosakowski	6	0	1
(United States) Nicholas Monroe	3	6	6
(South Africa) Izak van der Merwe	6	2	2
(Germany) Simon Stadler	3	6	6
WC	(United States) Denny Fafek	4	4
7	(United States) Donald Young	6	6

Second round
3	(United States) Denis Kudla	6	2	6
(United States) Nicholas Monroe	4	6	1
(Germany) Simon Stadler	3	5
7	(United States) Donald Young	6	7

Qualifying competition
3	(United States) Denis Kudla	4	3
7	(United States) Donald Young	6	6

==== Fourth qualifier ====
First round
4	(Ukraine) Illya Marchenko	6	6
WC	(Bulgaria) Boris Nicola Bakalov	4	0
(India) Prakash Amritraj	3	6	2
(United States) Jason Jung	6	2	6
(Slovenia) Luka Gregorc	3	3
(South Africa) Rik de Voest	6	6
(United States) Kevin Kim	5	6	3
8	(Colombia) Robert Farah	7	4	6

Second round
4	(Ukraine) Illya Marchenko	6	6
(United States) Jason Jung	3	3
(South Africa) Rik de Voest	6	7
8	(Colombia) Robert Farah	3	5

Qualifying competition
4	(Ukraine) Illya Marchenko	6^{5}	4
(South Africa) Rik de Voest	7^{7}	6
