= 2007 Delray Beach International Tennis Championships – Singles =

Singles
- 2007 Delray Beach International Tennis Championships

Final
- Champion: (Belgium) Xavier Malisse
- Runner-up: (United States) James Blake
- Score: 5–7, 6–4, 6–4

Details
- Draw: 32 (round robin)
- Seeds: 8

Events
Singles	Doubles
- Delray Beach Open

Tommy Haas was the defending champion, but lost in quarterfinals to Vincent Spadea.

Xavier Malisse won in the final 5–7, 6–4, 6–4 against James Blake.

== Seeds ==
1. (United States) James Blake (final)
2. (Germany) Tommy Haas (quarterfinals)
3. (Belgium) Xavier Malisse (champion)
4. (Germany) Benjamin Becker (semifinals)
5. (Germany) Florian Mayer (quarterfinals)
6. (Germany) Philipp Kohlschreiber (round robin)
7. (Spain) Guillermo García-López (quarterfinals)
8. (United States) Vincent Spadea (semifinals)

== Draw ==
Key

- Q = Qualifier
- WC = Wild card
- LL = Lucky loser
- Alt = Alternate
- ITF = ITF entry
- PR = Protected ranking
- SR = Special ranking
- SE = Special exempt
- JE = Junior exempt
- JR = Junior Accelerator Programme entrant
- CO = College Accelerator Programme entrant
- NG = Next Gen Accelerator Program entrant
- w/o = Walkover
- r = Retired
- d = Defaulted

=== Finals ===
Quarterfinals
1	(United States) James Blake	6	6
5	(Germany) Florian Mayer	3	4
4	(Germany) Benjamin Becker	7^{7}	6
(Italy) Davide Sanguinetti	6^{5}	3
7	(Spain) Guillermo García López	1	1
3	(Belgium) Xavier Malisse	6	6
8	(United States) Vincent Spadea	6	2	6
2	(Germany) Tommy Haas	3	6	4

Semifinals
1	(United States) James Blake	6	7^{9}
4	(Germany) Benjamin Becker	3	6^{7}
3	(Belgium) Xavier Malisse	6	6
8	(United States) Vincent Spadea	2	2

Final
1	(United States) James Blake	7	4	4
3	(Belgium) Xavier Malisse	5	6	6

=== Round robin ===
	Group 1	(United States) Blake	(United States) Kendrick	(United States) Jenkins	RR W–L	Set W–L	Game W–L	Standings
1	(United States) James Blake		6–3, 6–2	6–1, 6–3	2–0	4–0 (100%)	24–9 (72.7%)	1
	(United States) Robert Kendrick	3–6, 2–6		6–4, 6–4	1–1	2–2 (50.0%)	17–20 (45.9%)	2
Q	(United States) Scoville Jenkins	1–6, 3–6	4–6, 4–6		0–2	0–4 (0.0%)	12–24 (33.3%)	3

	Group 2	(Germany) Mayer	(Russia) Kunitsyn	(Romania) Pavel	RR W–L	Set W–L	Game W–L	Standings
5	(Germany) Florian Mayer		6–1, 6–3	6–3, 3–6, 6–2	2–0	4–1 (80.0%)	27–15 (64.3%)	1
	(Russia) Igor Kunitsyn	1–6, 3–6		1–6, 3–6	0–2	0–4 (0.0%)	8–24 (25.0%)	3
	(Romania) Andrei Pavel	3–6, 6–3, 2–6	6–1, 6–3		1–1	2–3 (40.0%)	23–19 (54.8%)	2

	Group 3	(Germany) Becker	(United States) Kim	(United States) Levine	RR W–L	Set W–L	Game W–L	Standings
4	(Germany) Benjamin Becker		7–6^{(7–4)}, 6–3	6–3, 6–3	2–0	4–0 (100%)	25–15 (62.5%)	1
	(United States) Kevin Kim	6–7^{(4–7)}, 3–6		2–6, 2–6	0–2	0–4 (0.0%)	13–25 (34.2%)	3
Q	(United States) Jesse Levine	3–6, 3–6	6–2, 6–2		1–1	2–2 (50.0%)	18–16 (52.9%)	2

	Group 4	(Germany) Kohlschreiber	(United States) Delic	(Italy) Sanguinetti	RR W–L	Set W–L	Game W–L	Standings
6	(Germany) Philipp Kohlschreiber		7–6^{(8–6)}, 1–6, 4–6	5–7, 3–6	0–2	1–4 (20.0%)	20–31 (39.2%)	3
	(United States) Amer Delic	6–7^{(6–8)}, 6–1, 6–4		3–6, 6–4, 3–6	1–1	3–3 (50.0%)	30–28 (51.7%)	2
	(Italy) Davide Sanguinetti	7–5, 6–3	6–3, 4–6, 6–3		2–0	4–1 (80.0%)	29–20 (59.2%)	1

	Group 5	(Spain) García López	(Denmark) Pless	(Russia) Gabashvili	RR W–L	Set W–L	Game W–L	Standings
7	(Spain) Guillermo García López		6–3, 7–6^{(7–5)}	6–3, 6–2	2–0	4–0 (100%)	25–14 (64.1%)	1
	(Denmark) Kristian Pless	3–6, 6–7^{(5–7)}		6–7^{(9–11)}, 7–6^{(7–2)}, 6–7^{(5–7)}	0–2	1–4 (20.0%)	28–33 (45.9%)	3
	(Russia) Teymuraz Gabashvili	3–6, 2–6	7–6^{(11–9)}, 6–7^{(2–7)}, 7–6^{(7–5)}		1–1	3–2 (60.0%)	25–31 (44.6%)	2

	Group 6	(Belgium) Malisse	(Germany) Schüttler	(Colombia) Falla	RR W–L	Set W–L	Game W–L	Standings
3	(Belgium) Xavier Malisse		7–6^{(7–4)}, 6–7^{(1–7)}, 3–6	6–4, 7–6^{(8–6)}	1–1	3–2 (60.0%)	29–29 (50.0%)	1
	(Germany) Rainer Schüttler	6–7^{(4–7)}, 7–6^{(7–1)}, 6–3		4–6, 3–6	1–1	2–3 (40.0%)	26–28 (48.1%)	3
	(Colombia) Alejandro Falla	4–6, 6–7^{(6–8)}	6–4, 6–3		1–1	2–2 (50.0%)	22–20 (52.4%)	2

	Group 7	(United States) Spadea	(Germany) Greul	(United States) Sweeting	RR W–L	Set W–L	Game W–L	Standings
8	(United States) Vincent Spadea		6–2, 7–5	7–5, 6–4	2–0	4–0 (100%)	26–16 (61.9%)	1
	(Germany) Simon Greul	2–6, 5–7		2–6, 2–6	0–2	0–4 (0.0%)	11–25 (30.5%)	3
WC	(United States) Ryan Sweeting	5–7, 4–6	6–2, 6–2		1–1	2–2 (50.0%)	21–17 (55.3%)	2

	Group 8	(Germany) Haas	(Chinese Taipei) Lu	(United States) Querrey	RR W–L	Set W–L	Game W–L	Standings
2	(Germany) Tommy Haas		2–6, 6–4, 6–3	6–4, 7–5	2–0	4–1 (80.0%)	27–22 (55.1%)	1
	(Chinese Taipei) Lu Yen-hsun	6–2, 4–6, 3–6		6–7^{(10–12)}, 4–6	0–2	1–4 (20.0%)	23–27 (46.0%)	3
	(United States) Sam Querrey	4–6, 5–7	7–6^{(12–10)}, 6–4		1–1	2–2 (50.0%)	22–23 (48.9%)	2

== Elimination round ==
Prior to the round robin and after the completion of the qualifying draws, the 16 players with the lowest tier in the tournament (4 qualifiers, 3 wild cards and 9 based on ATP rankings) competed in the elimination round in order to get one of the 8 last spots into the round robin competition. Winners in this round entered as main entrants.

Main draw elimination round
Event	Winner	Loser	Score
Main Entrant 1	(Italy) Davide Sanguinetti	(Serbia) Dušan Vemić [Q]	6–2, 4–6, 6–2
Main Entrant 2	(Colombia) Alejandro Falla	(Ukraine) Sergiy Stakhovsky [Q]	6–4, 6–4
Main Entrant 3	(Romania) Andrei Pavel	(Serbia) Ilija Bozoljac	6–3, 1–0, retired
Main Entrant 4	(Russia) Teymuraz Gabashvili	(United States) Jan-Michael Gambill [WC]	7–6^{(7–3)}, 6–4
Main Entrant 5	(United States) Ryan Sweeting [WC]	(United States) Michael Russell [WC]	7–6^{(7–4)}, 2–2, retired
Main Entrant 6	(United States) Sam Querrey	(Greece) Konstantinos Economidis	6–0, 6–2
Main Entrant 7	(United States) Scoville Jenkins [Q]	(United Kingdom) Alex Bogdanovic	6–3, 7–6^{(7–3)}
Main Entrant 8	(United States) Jesse Levine [Q]	(Poland) Łukasz Kubot	6–3, 6–2

== Qualifying ==
=== Seeds ===
1. (Colombia) Santiago Giraldo (qualifying competition)
2. (United States) Hugo Armando (qualifying competition)
3. (Germany) Benedikt Dorsch (first round)
4. (United Kingdom) Alan Mackin (first round)
5. (United States) Todd Widom (first round)
6. (Switzerland) Michael Lammer (qualifying competition)
7. (Canada) Frédéric Niemeyer (qualifying competition)
8. (Ukraine) Sergiy Stakhovsky (qualified)

=== Qualifiers ===
1. (Serbia) Dušan Vemić
2. (Ukraine) Sergiy Stakhovsky
3. (United States) Jesse Levine
4. (United States) Scoville Jenkins

=== Qualifying draw ===
==== First qualifier ====
First round
1	(Colombia) Santiago Giraldo	7^{7}	1	7^{7}
(United Kingdom) James Auckland	6^{4}	6	6^{4}
(Serbia) Dušan Vemić	7^{9}	6
5	(United States) Todd Widom	6^{7}	4

Qualifying competition
1	(Colombia) Santiago Giraldo	4	4
(Serbia) Dušan Vemić	6	6

==== Second qualifier ====
First round
2	(United States) Hugo Armando	6	6
(Netherlands Antilles) Jean-Julien Rojer	3	3
WC	(United States) Alex Clayton	6^{3}	4
8	(Ukraine) Sergiy Stakhovsky	7^{7}	6

Qualifying competition
2	(United States) Hugo Armando	4	3
8	(Ukraine) Sergiy Stakhovsky	6	6

==== Third qualifier ====
First round
3	(Germany) Benedikt Dorsch	6^{6}	4
WC	(United States) Jesse Levine	7^{8}	6
WC	(Haiti) Olivier Claude Sajous	3	4
6	(Switzerland) Michael Lammer	6	6

Qualifying competition
WC	(United States) Jesse Levine	7	6
6	(Switzerland) Michael Lammer	5	0

==== Fourth qualifier ====
First round
4	(United Kingdom) Alan Mackin	3	6	4
(United States) Scoville Jenkins	6	4	6
(United States) Roman Borvanov	3	2
7	(Canada) Frédéric Niemeyer	6	6

Qualifying competition
(United States) Scoville Jenkins	6^{4}	7^{7}	6
7	(Canada) Frédéric Niemeyer	7^{7}	6^{5}	2
