= 2013 SAP Open =

- Date: February 11–17
- Edition: 125th
- Category: World Tour 250 series
- Draw: 32S / 16D
- Prize money: $546,930
- Surface: Hard
- Location: San Jose, United States
- Venue: HP Pavilion

Champions

Singles
- (Canada) Milos Raonic

Doubles
- (Belgium) Xavier Malisse / (Germany) Frank Moser
← 2012 ·	Pacific Coast Championships

The 2013 SAP Open was a men's tennis tournament played on indoor hard courts. It was the 125th and final edition of the SAP Open, and part of the ATP World Tour 250 series of the 2013 ATP World Tour. It took place at the HP Pavilion in San Jose, United States, from February 11 through February 17, 2013. First-seeded Milos Raonic won the singles title.

== Finals ==
=== Singles ===
- (Canada) Milos Raonic defeated (Germany) Tommy Haas, 6–4, 6–3

=== Doubles ===
- (Belgium) Xavier Malisse / (Germany) Frank Moser defeated (Australia) Lleyton Hewitt / (Australia) Marinko Matosevic, 6–0, 6–7^{(5–7)}, [10–4]

== Singles main-draw entrants ==
=== Seeds ===
Country	Player	Rank^{1}	Seed
CAN	Milos Raonic	13	1
USA	John Isner	16	2
USA	Sam Querrey	20	3
GER	Tommy Haas	22	4
ESP	Fernando Verdasco	24	5
UZB	Denis Istomin	46	6
AUS	Marinko Matosevic	49	7
BEL	Xavier Malisse	51	8

- Rankings are as of February 4, 2013.

=== Other entrants ===
The following players received wildcards into the singles main draw:

- (United States) Steve Johnson
- (United States) Bradley Klahn
- (United States) Jack Sock

The following players received entry from the qualifying draw:

- (South Africa) Rik de Voest
- (United States) Tim Smyczek
- (United States) Ryan Sweeting
- (United States) Donald Young

=== Withdrawals ===
Before the tournament

- (South Africa) Kevin Anderson (elbow injury)
- (United States) Brian Baker (knee injury)
- (Ukraine) Alexandr Dolgopolov (ankle injury)
- (United States) Mardy Fish (heart problem)
- (Spain) Feliciano López (wrist injury)

== Doubles main-draw entrants ==
=== Seeds ===
Country	Player	Country	Player	Rank^{1}	Seed
USA	Bob Bryan	USA	Mike Bryan	3	1
ESP	David Marrero	ESP	Fernando Verdasco	45	2
MEX	Santiago González	USA	Scott Lipsky	67	3
BEL	Xavier Malisse	GER	Frank Moser	124	4

- Rankings are as of February 4, 2013.

=== Other entrants ===
The following pairs received wildcards into the doubles main draw:

- (Australia) Lleyton Hewitt / (Australia) Marinko Matosevic
- (United States) Steve Johnson / (United States) Jack Sock

The following pair received entry as alternate:

- (Australia) Matthew Ebden / (United States) Michael Russell

=== Withdrawals ===
Before the tournament

- (United States) Sam Querrey (personal reasons)
