= 2005 Millennium International Tennis Championships – Doubles =

Doubles
- 2005 Millennium International Tennis Championships

Final
- Champions: (Sweden) Simon Aspelin (Australia) Todd Perry
- Runners-up: (Australia) Jordan Kerr (United States) Jim Thomas
- Score: 6–3, 6–3

Events
Singles	Doubles
← 2004 ·	Delray Beach Open	· 2006 →

Leander Paes and Radek Štěpánek were the defending champions, but did not participate this year.

Simon Aspelin and Todd Perry won in the final 6–3, 6–3 against Jordan Kerr and Jim Thomas.

== Seeds ==
1. (Sweden) Simon Aspelin / (Australia) Todd Perry (champions)
2. (United States) Rick Leach / (United States) Brian MacPhie (semifinals)
3. (Czech Republic) Jaroslav Levinský / (Czech Republic) Jiří Novák (quarterfinals)
4. (Australia) Jordan Kerr / (United States) Jim Thomas (final)

== Draw ==
=== Key ===
- Q = Qualifier
- WC = Wild card
- LL = Lucky loser
- Alt = Alternate
- SE = Special exempt
- PR = Protected ranking
- ITF = ITF entry
- JE = Junior exempt
- w/o = Walkover
- r = Retired
- d = Defaulted
- SR = Special ranking

=== Draw ===
First round
1	(Sweden) S Aspelin (Australia) T Perry	7^{7}	6^{5}	6
(United States) J-M Gambill (Australia) P Hanley	6^{5}	7^{7}	4
(Netherlands) D van Scheppingen (Netherlands) P Wessels	7	6
(Australia) A Fisher (United States) G Oliver	5	4
3	(Czech Republic) J Levinský (Czech Republic) J Novák	6	7^{7}
(Australia) N Healey (United States) V Spadea	3	6^{0}
(South Africa) J Coetzee (United States) T Parrott	6	3	6
(Brazil) A Sá (Netherlands) R Wassen	1	6	3
WC	(United States) L Jensen (United States) M Jensen	3	0
WC	(United States) R Kendrick (The Bahamas) M Merklein	6	6
Alt	(Germany) S Fitz (Russia) T Gabashvili	1	3
4	(Australia) J Kerr (United States) J Thomas	6	6
(Brazil) R Mello (South Africa) W Moodie	4	7^{9}	7^{7}
(United States) K Kim (United States) T Phillips	6	6^{7}	6^{5}
(Germany) K Braasch (Czech Republic) T Cibulec	6^{2}	2
2	(United States) R Leach (United States) B MacPhie	7^{7}	6

Quarterfinals
1	(Sweden) S Aspelin (Australia) T Perry	w/o
(Netherlands) D van Scheppingen (Netherlands) P Wessels
3	(Czech Republic) J Levinský (Czech Republic) J Novák	3	7^{9}	4
(South Africa) J Coetzee (United States) T Parrott	6	6^{7}	6
WC	(United States) R Kendrick (The Bahamas) M Merklein	4	5
4	(Australia) J Kerr (United States) J Thomas	6	7
(Brazil) R Mello (South Africa) W Moodie	3	6^{4}
2	(United States) R Leach (United States) B MacPhie	6	7^{7}

Semifinals
1	(Sweden) S Aspelin (Australia) T Perry	7^{7}	4	7
(South Africa) J Coetzee (United States) T Parrott	6^{3}	6	5
4	(Australia) J Kerr (United States) J Thomas	6	6
2	(United States) R Leach (United States) B MacPhie	3	4

Final
1	(Sweden) S Aspelin (Australia) T Perry	6	6
4	(Australia) J Kerr (United States) J Thomas	3	3
