= 2013 SAP Open – Doubles =

Doubles
- 2013 SAP Open

Final
- Champions: (Belgium) Xavier Malisse (Germany) Frank Moser
- Runners-up: (Australia) Lleyton Hewitt (Australia) Marinko Matosevic
- Score: 6–0, 6–7^{(5–7)}, [10–4]

Details
- Draw: 16
- Seeds: 4

Events
Singles	Doubles
- Pacific Coast Championships

Mark Knowles and Xavier Malisse were the defending champions but Knowles did not participate this year because of his retirement from professional tennis in September 2012. Malisse played alongside Frank Moser and successfully defended the title, defeating Lleyton Hewitt and Marinko Matosevic in the final 6–0, 6–7^{(5–7)}, [10–4].

== Seeds ==
1. (United States) Bob Bryan / (United States) Mike Bryan (quarterfinals)
2. (Spain) David Marrero / (Spain) Fernando Verdasco (first round)
3. (Mexico) Santiago González / (United States) Scott Lipsky (quarterfinals)
4. (Belgium) Xavier Malisse / (Germany) Frank Moser (champions)

== Draw ==
Key

- Q = Qualifier
- WC = Wild card
- LL = Lucky loser
- Alt = Alternate
- ITF = ITF entry
- PR = Protected ranking
- SR = Special ranking
- SE = Special exempt
- JE = Junior exempt
- JR = Junior Accelerator Programme entrant
- CO = College Accelerator Programme entrant
- NG = Next Gen Accelerator Program entrant
- w/o = Walkover
- r = Retired
- d = Defaulted

=== Draw ===
First round
1	(United States) B Bryan (United States) M Bryan	7^{7}	7^{7}
WC	(United States) S Johnson (United States) J Sock	6^{3}	6^{5}
(Germany) P Marx (Romania) F Mergea	6	6^{5}	[2]
WC	(Australia) L Hewitt (Australia) M Matosevic	1	7^{7}	[10]
3	(Mexico) S González (United States) S Lipsky	6	6
(United States) J Cerretani (Canada) A Shamasdin	3	4
(United States) N Monroe (Germany) S Stadler	4	4
(Russia) M Elgin (Uzbekistan) D Istomin	6	6
(Germany) B Becker (Italy) F Cipolla	3	6^{6}
Alt	(Australia) M Ebden (United States) M Russell	6	7^{8}
(United Kingdom) J Murray (Australia) J Peers	4	4
4	(Belgium) X Malisse (Germany) F Moser	6	6
(Colombia) A Falla (Colombia) R Farah	6	6
(United States) R Harrison (United States) J Isner	2	1
(South Africa) R de Voest (Germany) T Haas	6	6^{5}	[10]
2	(Spain) D Marrero (Spain) F Verdasco	1	7^{7}	[6]

Quarterfinals
1	(United States) B Bryan (United States) M Bryan	4	7^{7}	[7]
WC	(Australia) L Hewitt (Australia) M Matosevic	6	6^{4}	[10]
3	(Mexico) S González (United States) S Lipsky	4	4
(Russia) M Elgin (Uzbekistan) D Istomin	6	6
Alt	(Australia) M Ebden (United States) M Russell	3	3
4	(Belgium) X Malisse (Germany) F Moser	6	6
(Colombia) A Falla (Colombia) R Farah	5	7^{7}	[10]
(South Africa) R de Voest (Germany) T Haas	7	6^{3}	[6]

Semifinals
WC	(Australia) L Hewitt (Australia) M Matosevic	6^{7}	7^{7}	[10]
(Russia) M Elgin (Uzbekistan) D Istomin	7^{9}	6^{2}	[5]
4	(Belgium) X Malisse (Germany) F Moser	6	6
(Colombia) A Falla (Colombia) R Farah	4	1

Final
WC	(Australia) L Hewitt (Australia) M Matosevic	0	7^{7}	[4]
4	(Belgium) X Malisse (Germany) F Moser	6	6^{5}	[10]
