= 2003 Delray Beach International Tennis Championships – Singles =

Singles
- 2003 Delray Beach International Tennis Championships

Final
- Champion: (United States) Jan-Michael Gambill
- Runner-up: (United States) Mardy Fish
- Score: 6–0, 7–6^{(7–5)}

Details
- Draw: 32
- Seeds: 8

Events
Singles	Doubles
← 2002 ·	Delray Beach Open	· 2004 →

Davide Sanguinetti was the defending champion but did not compete that year.

Jan-Michael Gambill won in the final 6–0, 7–6^{(7–5)} against Mardy Fish.

== Seeds ==
1. (United States) Andy Roddick (first round, retired)
2. (Argentina) Guillermo Coria (first round)
3. (Chile) Marcelo Ríos (semifinals)
4. (United States) Jan-Michael Gambill (champion)
5. (France) Arnaud Clément (first round)
6. (Netherlands) Raemon Sluiter (first round)
7. (Austria) Stefan Koubek (first round)
8. (United States) Vince Spadea (second round)

== Draw ==
=== Key ===
- Q = Qualifier
- WC = Wild card
- LL = Lucky loser
- Alt = Alternate
- SE = Special exempt
- PR = Protected ranking
- ITF = ITF entry
- JE = Junior exempt
- w/o = Walkover
- r = Retired
- d = Defaulted
- SR = Special ranking

=== Finals ===
Semifinals
(United States) Mardy Fish	6	6
WC/3	(Chile) Marcelo Ríos	3	4
4	(United States) Jan-Michael Gambill	6	2	7^{7}
Q	(United States) Robert Kendrick	3	6	6^{5}

Final
(United States) Mardy Fish	0	6^{5}
4	(United States) Jan-Michael Gambill	6	7^{7}

=== Top half ===
First round
1	(United States) A Roddick	6^{4}	3^{r}
(United States) M Fish	7^{7}	4
(Brazil) F Meligeni	6	6
(Hungary) A Sávolt	3	4
(Spain) A Martín	6	3	6
(United States) B Vahaly	4	6	3
(Georgia (country)) I Labadze	7^{8}	7
6	(Netherlands) R Sluiter	6^{6}	5
WC/3	(Chile) M Ríos	6	6
(United States) J Morrison	3	3
(Netherlands) M Verkerk	7^{7}	6
Q	(Brazil) R Mello	6^{5}	4
(Brazil) A Sá	5	2
(South Korea) H-T Lee	7	6
(Switzerland) M Kratochvil	6	7^{7}
5	(France) A Clément	3	6^{5}

Second round
(United States) M Fish	6	7^{7}
(Brazil) F Meligeni	2	6^{4}
(Spain) A Martín	6	6
(Georgia (country)) I Labadze	4	2
WC/3	(Chile) M Ríos	2	6	7
(Netherlands) M Verkerk	6	4	5
(South Korea) H-T Lee	6	6
(Switzerland) M Kratochvil	2	3

Quarterfinals
(United States) M Fish	6	6
(Spain) A Martín	3	3
WC/3	(Chile) M Ríos	6	6
(South Korea) H-T Lee	3	4

Semifinals
(United States) M Fish	6	6
WC/3	(Chile) M Ríos	3	4

=== Bottom half ===
First round
8	(United States) V Spadea	6	6
Q	(France) M Llodra	3	0
(Brazil) F Saretta	6	6
Q	(United States) P Goldstein	4	4
WC	(United States) J Gimelstob	6	6
LL	(United States) A Bogomolov, Jr.	4	0
(Germany) N Kiefer	2	4
4	(United States) J-M Gambill	6	6
7	(Austria) S Koubek	4	4
Q	(United States) R Kendrick	6	6
(Monaco) J-R Lisnard	6	4	6
(Germany) L Burgsmüller	2	6	2
(Belarus) V Voltchkov	6	6
WC	(United States) A Kim	4	4
(Armenia) S Sargsian	7	6
2	(Argentina) G Coria	5	2

Second round
8	(United States) V Spadea	4	6	4
(Brazil) F Saretta	6	3	6
WC	(United States) J Gimelstob	5	5
4	(United States) J-M Gambill	7	7
Q	(United States) R Kendrick	7	7
(Monaco) J-R Lisnard	5	5
(Belarus) V Voltchkov	5	6	1
(Armenia) S Sargsian	7	4	0^{r}

Quarterfinals
(Brazil) F Saretta	6	6^{3}	0
4	(United States) J-M Gambill	4	7^{7}	6
Q	(United States) R Kendrick	6	6
(Belarus) V Voltchkov	0	4

Semifinals
4	(United States) J-M Gambill	6	2	7^{7}
Q	(United States) R Kendrick	3	6	6^{5}
