= 2003 Delray Beach International Tennis Championships – Doubles =

Doubles
- 2003 Delray Beach International Tennis Championships

Final
- Champions: (India) Leander Paes (Serbia and Montenegro) Nenad Zimonjić
- Runners-up: (Netherlands) Raemon Sluiter (Netherlands) Martin Verkerk
- Score: 7–5, 3–6, 7–5

Events
Singles	Doubles
← 2002 ·	Delray Beach Open	· 2004 →

Martin Damm and Cyril Suk were the defending champions but did not compete that year.

Leander Paes and Nenad Zimonjić won in the final 7–5, 3–6, 7–5 against Raemon Sluiter and Martin Verkerk.

== Seeds ==
1. (India) Mahesh Bhupathi / (Australia) Joshua Eagle (first round)
2. (South Africa) David Adams / (South Africa) Robbie Koenig (first round)
3. (United States) Jan-Michael Gambill / (United States) Graydon Oliver (semifinals)
4. (Czech Republic) František Čermák / (Czech Republic) Leoš Friedl (first round)

== Draw ==
=== Key ===
- Q = Qualifier
- WC = Wild card
- LL = Lucky loser
- Alt = Alternate
- SE = Special exempt
- PR = Protected ranking
- ITF = ITF entry
- JE = Junior exempt
- w/o = Walkover
- r = Retired
- d = Defaulted
- SR = Special ranking

First round
1	(India) M Bhupathi (Australia) J Eagle	3	6^{4}
(Sweden) S Aspelin (Australia) N Healey	6	7^{7}
WC	(United States) P Goldstein (United States) R Kendrick	7^{9}	7^{7}
(Argentina) A Schneiter (United States) J Tarango	6^{7}	6^{3}
4	(Czech Republic) F Čermák (Czech Republic) L Friedl	7	6^{1}	2
(United States) A Roddick (United States) B Vahaly	5	7^{7}	6
(South Korea) H-T Lee (Belarus) V Voltchkov	6	1^{r}
(Netherlands) R Sluiter (Netherlands) M Verkerk	4	1
(Argentina) M Hood (Australia) A Kratzmann	2	4
(Argentina) L Lobo (Chile) M Ríos	6	6
(Monaco) J-R Lisnard (France) M Llodra	6	1	1
3	(United States) J-M Gambill (United States) G Oliver	3	6	6
(United States) D Bowen (Spain) A Martín	6^{2}	6^{0}
WC	(United States) L Jensen (United States) M Jensen	7^{7}	7^{7}
(India) L Paes (Serbia and Montenegro) N Zimonjić	6	6^{4}	6
2	(South Africa) D Adams (South Africa) R Koenig	2	7^{7}	1

Quarterfinals
(Sweden) S Aspelin (Australia) N Healey	7^{7}	3	4
WC	(United States) P Goldstein (United States) R Kendrick	6^{4}	6	6
(United States) A Roddick (United States) B Vahaly
(Netherlands) R Sluiter (Netherlands) M Verkerk	w/o
(Argentina) L Lobo (Chile) M Ríos	6^{9}	2
3	(United States) J-M Gambill (United States) G Oliver	7^{11}	6
WC	(United States) L Jensen (United States) M Jensen
(India) L Paes (Serbia and Montenegro) N Zimonjić	w/o

Semifinals
WC	(United States) P Goldstein (United States) R Kendrick	4	6	6^{4}
(Netherlands) R Sluiter (Netherlands) M Verkerk	6	3	7^{7}
3	(United States) J-M Gambill (United States) G Oliver	3	6	3
(India) L Paes (Serbia and Montenegro) N Zimonjić	6	3	6

Final
(Netherlands) R Sluiter (Netherlands) M Verkerk	5	6	5
(India) L Paes (Serbia and Montenegro) N Zimonjić	7	3	7
