= 2004 Millennium International Tennis Championships =

- Date: September 13–20
- Edition: 12th
- Category: International Series
- Draw: 32S / 16D
- Prize money: $355,000
- Location: Delray Beach, Florida, U.S.
- Venue: Delray Beach Tennis Center

Champions

Singles
- (Brazil) Ricardo Mello

Doubles
- (India) Leander Paes / (Czech Republic) Radek Štěpánek
← 2003 ·	Delray Beach Open	· 2005 →

The 2004 Millennium International Tennis Championships was an ATP tournament held in Delray Beach, Florida, United States that was part of the International Series of the 2004 ATP Tour. It was the 12th editions of the tournament and was held from September 13 to September 20. Unseeded Ricardo Mello won the singles title.

== Finals ==
=== Singles ===
(Brazil) Ricardo Mello defeated (United States) Vincent Spadea 7–6^{(7–2)}, 6–3

- It was Mello's only singles title of the year and of his career.

=== Doubles ===
(India) Leander Paes / (Czech Republic) Radek Štěpánek defeated (Argentina) Gastón Etlis / (Argentina) Martín Rodríguez 6–0, 6–3

- It was Paes's 4th title of the year and the 33rd of his career. It was Štěpánek's 3rd title of the year and the 9th of his career.
