= Adrian Bohane =

Irish-American tennis player

- Country (sports): Ireland; United States
- Born: September 15, 1981 (age 43); Ireland
- Height: 6 ft 4 in (193 cm)
- Plays: Left-handed

Singles
- Career record: 0–1
- Highest ranking: No. 986 (Nov 22, 2004)

Doubles
- Highest ranking: No. 1522 (Jul 12, 2004)

Adrian Bohane (born September 15, 1981) is an Irish-American former professional tennis player.

Bohane was born in Ireland and moved to the United States during his childhood. His father, Mick, was a Gaelic football representative for Cork and played in the 1964 Munster Championship final.

A tall left-hander, Bohane was ranked amongst the top-20 juniors in the United States. His junior career included a win over Andy Roddick, in the 1998 Panama Bowl final. He went on to play collegiate tennis for Ohio State University.

In 2004 he made an ATP Tour main draw appearance at the Delray Beach International Tennis Championships, where he lost his first round match to James Blake in three sets.
