= 2006 Delray Beach International Tennis Championships – Doubles =

Doubles
- 2006 Delray Beach International Tennis Championships

Final
- Champions: (The Bahamas) Mark Knowles (Canada) Daniel Nestor
- Runners-up: (South Africa) Chris Haggard (South Africa) Wesley Moodie
- Score: 6–2, 6–3

Events
Singles	Doubles
← 2005 ·	Delray Beach Open	· 2007 →

Simon Aspelin and Todd Perry were the defending champions, but did not participate this year.

Mark Knowles and Daniel Nestor won in the final 6–2, 6–3, against Chris Haggard and Wesley Moodie.

== Seeds ==
1. (The Bahamas) Mark Knowles / (Canada) Daniel Nestor (champions)
2. (Australia) Jordan Kerr / (United States) Travis Parrott (first round)
3. (South Africa) Chris Haggard / (South Africa) Wesley Moodie (final)
4. (South Africa) Jeff Coetzee / (Netherlands) Rogier Wassen (quarterfinals)

== Draw ==
=== Key ===
- Q = Qualifier
- WC = Wild card
- LL = Lucky loser
- Alt = Alternate
- SE = Special exempt
- PR = Protected ranking
- ITF = ITF entry
- JE = Junior exempt
- w/o = Walkover
- r = Retired
- d = Defaulted
- SR = Special ranking

=== Draw ===
First round
1	(The Bahamas) M Knowles (Canada) D Nestor	6^{4}	6	[10]
(United States) K Kim (South Korea) H-t Lee	7^{7}	2	[2]
(United States) R Ginepri (United States) B Reynolds
(Paraguay) R Delgado (France) O Patience	w/o
4	(South Africa) J Coetzee (Netherlands) R Wassen	7	7
(United States) J Gimelstob (United States) J Thomas	5	5
(Austria) O Marach (Czech Republic) C Suk	7^{7}	2	[10]
(Germany) M Kohlmann (Luxembourg) G Müller	6^{5}	6	[6]
(Thailand) D Udomchoke (Chinese Taipei) Y-t Wang	3	3
WC	(United States) A Bogomolov Jr. (United States) T Widom	6	6
(Australia) A Fisher (United States) T Phillips	1	4
3	(South Africa) C Haggard (South Africa) W Moodie	6	6
WC	(United States) A Clayton (United States) R Kendrick	4	2
(Romania) A Pavel (Romania) R Sabău	6	6
(Spain) G García-López (United States) V Spadea	6	6
2	(Australia) J Kerr (United States) T Parrott	2	4

Quarterfinals
1	(The Bahamas) M Knowles (Canada) D Nestor	6	6
(Paraguay) R Delgado (France) O Patience	1	1
4	(South Africa) J Coetzee (Netherlands) R Wassen	0	5
(Austria) O Marach (Czech Republic) C Suk	6	7
WC	(United States) A Bogomolov Jr. (United States) T Widom	3	2
3	(South Africa) C Haggard (South Africa) W Moodie	6	6
(Romania) A Pavel (Romania) R Sabău	2	6^{2}
(Spain) G García-López (United States) V Spadea	2	7^{7}

Semifinals
1	(The Bahamas) M Knowles (Canada) D Nestor	6^{5}	7^{15}	[10]
(Austria) O Marach (Czech Republic) C Suk	7^{7}	6^{13}	[4]
3	(South Africa) C Haggard (South Africa) W Moodie	6	6
(Spain) G García-López (United States) V Spadea	4	1

Final
1	(The Bahamas) M Knowles (Canada) D Nestor	6	6
3	(South Africa) C Haggard (South Africa) W Moodie	2	3
