= 2008 Delray Beach International Tennis Championships =

- Date: February 11–17
- Edition: 16th
- Category: International Series
- Draw: 32S / 16D
- Prize money: $411,000
- Surface: Hard / outdoor
- Location: Delray Beach, Florida, U.S.
- Venue: Delray Beach Tennis Center

Champions

Singles
- (Japan) Kei Nishikori

Doubles
- (Belarus) Max Mirnyi / (United Kingdom) Jamie Murray
← 2007 ·	Delray Beach Open	· 2009 →

The 2008 Delray Beach International Tennis Championships was a men's tennis tournament played on outdoor hard courts. It was the 16th edition of the Delray Beach International Tennis Championships, and was part of the International Series of the 2008 ATP Tour. It took place at the Delray Beach Tennis Center in Delray Beach, Florida, United States, from February 11 through February 17, 2008.

The field was headlined by ATP No. 12, 2007 Davis Cup champion and Australian Open quarterfinalist James Blake, 2007 U.S. Open quarterfinalist Tommy Haas, and 2007 Cincinnati Masters quarterfinalist Sam Querrey. Other top seeds competing were 2007 Tokyo quarterfinalist Dudi Sela, Auckland quarterfinalist Florian Mayer, Vincent Spadea, Victor Hănescu and Mardy Fish.

In winning the tournament Kei Nishikori became the first Japanese man in nearly sixteen years to win an ATP Tour event. Shuzo Matsuoka, the last one to do so, against Todd Woodbridge at the 1992 Seoul Open, used to coach Nishikori.

== Finals ==
=== Singles ===
(Japan) Kei Nishikori defeated (United States) James Blake, 3–6, 6–1, 6–4

- It was Kei Nishikori's 1st career singles title.

=== Doubles ===
(Belarus) Max Mirnyi / (United Kingdom) Jamie Murray defeated (United States) Bob Bryan / (United States) Mike Bryan, 6–4, 3–6, [10–6]
