= 2007 Delray Beach International Tennis Championships – Doubles =

Doubles
- 2007 Delray Beach International Tennis Championships

Final
- Champions: (United States) Hugo Armando (Belgium) Xavier Malisse
- Runners-up: (United Kingdom) James Auckland (Australia) Stephen Huss
- Score: 6–3, 6–7^{(4–7)}, [10–5]

Events
Singles	Doubles
← 2006 ·	Delray Beach Open	· 2008 →

Mark Knowles and Daniel Nestor were the defending champions, but did not participate this year.

Hugo Armando and Xavier Malisse won in the final 6–3, 6–7^{(4–7)}, [10–5], against James Auckland and Stephen Huss.

== Seeds ==
1. (South Africa) Jeff Coetzee / (Netherlands) Rogier Wassen (semifinals)
2. (United States) Eric Butorac / (United States) Travis Parrott (quarterfinals)
3. (Poland) Łukasz Kubot / (Romania) Andrei Pavel (semifinals)
4. (United Kingdom) James Auckland / (Australia) Stephen Huss (final)

== Draw ==
=== Key ===
- Q = Qualifier
- WC = Wild card
- LL = Lucky loser
- Alt = Alternate
- SE = Special exempt
- PR = Protected ranking
- ITF = ITF entry
- JE = Junior exempt
- w/o = Walkover
- r = Retired
- d = Defaulted
- SR = Special ranking

=== Draw ===
First round
1	(South Africa) J Coetzee (Netherlands) R Wassen	7^{7}	6
(Colombia) A Falla (Spain) G García-López	6^{5}	2
(India) R Bopanna (South Africa) C Haggard	6	6^{3}	[2]
(Italy) D Sanguinetti (United States) V Spadea	2	7^{7}	[10]
4	(United Kingdom) J Auckland (Australia) S Huss	7^{7}	4	[11]
(United States) A Delic (United States) R Kendrick	6^{4}	6	[9]
WC	(United States) J-M Gambill (Germany) R Schüttler	6	4	[14]
(Germany) S Greul (United States) K Kim	2	6	[12]
(Germany) B Becker (Russia) I Kunitsyn	6^{5}	6	[10]
(Chinese Taipei) Y-h Lu (Denmark) K Pless	7^{7}	3	[8]
WC	(Greece) K Economidis (Russia) T Gabashvili	6^{9}	6	[7]
3	(Poland) Ł Kubot (Romania) A Pavel	7^{11}	3	[10]
(United States) H Armando (Belgium) X Malisse	6	6
(Germany) P Kohlschreiber (Germany) F Mayer	1	4
(United States) C Drake (United States) S Lipsky	3	4
2	(United States) E Butorac (United States) T Parrott	6	6

Quarterfinals
1	(South Africa) J Coetzee (Netherlands) R Wassen	6	7
(Italy) D Sanguinetti (United States) V Spadea	3	5
4	(United Kingdom) J Auckland (Australia) S Huss	7	6^{2}	[17]
WC	(United States) J-M Gambill (Germany) R Schüttler	5	7^{7}	[15]
(Germany) B Becker (Russia) I Kunitsyn	2	2
3	(Poland) Ł Kubot (Romania) A Pavel	6	6
(United States) H Armando (Belgium) X Malisse	6	7^{7}
2	(United States) E Butorac (United States) T Parrott	4	6^{3}

Semifinals
1	(South Africa) J Coetzee (Netherlands) R Wassen	6^{3}	1
4	(United Kingdom) J Auckland (Australia) S Huss	7^{7}	6
3	(Poland) Ł Kubot (Romania) A Pavel	7^{7}	3	[8]
(United States) H Armando (Belgium) X Malisse	6^{1}	6	[10]

Final
4	(United Kingdom) J Auckland (Australia) S Huss	3	7^{7}	[5]
(United States) H Armando (Belgium) X Malisse	6	6^{4}	[10]
