= 2003 Delray Beach International Tennis Championships =

- Date: March 3–9
- Edition: 11th
- Category: International Series
- Draw: 32S / 16D
- Prize money: $355,000
- Location: Delray Beach, Florida, U.S.
- Venue: Delray Beach Tennis Center

Champions

Singles
- (United States) Jan-Michael Gambill

Doubles
- (India) Leander Paes / (Serbia and Montenegro) Nenad Zimonjić
- Delray Beach Open

The 2003 Delray Beach International Tennis Championships was a men's tennis tournament played on outdoor hard courts at the Delray Beach Tennis Center in Delray Beach, Florida in the United States, and was part of the International Series of the 2003 ATP Tour. It was the 11th edition of the tournament and was held from March 3 through March 9, 2003. Fourth-seeded Jan-Michael Gambill won the singles title.

== Finals ==
=== Singles ===
(United States) Jan-Michael Gambill defeated (United States) Mardy Fish 6–0, 7–6^{(7–5)}

- It was Gambill's 1st singles title of the year and the 3rd and last of his career.

=== Doubles ===
(India) Leander Paes / (Serbia and Montenegro) Nenad Zimonjić defeated (Netherlands) Raemon Sluiter / (Netherlands) Martin Verkerk 7–5, 3–6, 7–5

- It was Paes's 2nd title of the year and the 28th of his career. It was Zimonjić's 1st title of the year and the 6th of his career.
