= 2006 Delray Beach International Tennis Championships – Singles =

Singles
- 2006 Delray Beach International Tennis Championships

Final
- Champion: (Germany) Tommy Haas
- Runner-up: (Belgium) Xavier Malisse
- Score: 6–3, 3–6, 7–6^{(7–5)}

Details
- Draw: 32
- Seeds: 8

Events
Singles	Doubles
- Delray Beach Open

Xavier Malisse was the defending champion but lost in the final 6–3, 3–6, 7–6^{(7–5)} against Tommy Haas.

== Seeds ==
1. (United States) Andre Agassi (quarterfinals)
2. (United States) Robby Ginepri (first round)
3. (Belgium) Xavier Malisse (final)
4. (Germany) Tommy Haas (champion)
5. (South Africa) Wesley Moodie (first round)
6. (Germany) Florian Mayer (quarterfinals)
7. (Luxembourg) Gilles Müller (quarterfinals)
8. (United States) Vince Spadea (semifinals)

== Draw ==
Key

- Q = Qualifier
- WC = Wild card
- LL = Lucky loser
- Alt = Alternate
- ITF = ITF entry
- PR = Protected ranking
- SR = Special ranking
- SE = Special exempt
- JE = Junior exempt
- JR = Junior Accelerator Programme entrant
- CO = College Accelerator Programme entrant
- NG = Next Gen Accelerator Program entrant
- w/o = Walkover
- r = Retired
- d = Defaulted

=== Finals ===
Semifinals
(Spain) Guillermo García López	6^{4}	1
3	(Belgium) Xavier Malisse	7^{7}	6
4	(Germany) Tommy Haas	6	6
8	(United States) Vince Spadea	3	2

Final
3	(Belgium) Xavier Malisse	3	6	6^{5}
4	(Germany) Tommy Haas	6	3	7^{7}

=== Top half ===
First round
WC/1	(United States) A Agassi	6	6
(Brazil) R Mello	4	4
(United States) B Reynolds	6	1	4
(Paraguay) R Delgado	4	6	6
(Germany) B Phau	1	4
(Spain) G García López	6	6
Q	(United States) T Widom	3	6	6
5	(South Africa) W Moodie	6	4	4
3	(Belgium) X Malisse	6	6
WC	(Armenia) S Sargsian	2	2
(United States) J Gimelstob	6	6
(Thailand) D Udomchoke	4	4
(Austria) O Marach	2
(France) C Saulnier	0^{r}
(Germany) M Berrer	6	0	3
6	(Germany) F Mayer	4	6	6

Second round
WC/1	(United States) A Agassi	4	7^{7}	6
(Paraguay) R Delgado	6	6^{4}	0
(Spain) G García López	6	6
Q	(United States) T Widom	3	2
3	(Belgium) X Malisse	6	7
(United States) J Gimelstob	2	5
(Austria) O Marach	5	3
6	(Germany) F Mayer	7	6

Quarterfinals
WC/1	(United States) A Agassi	4	2
(Spain) G García López	6	6
3	(Belgium) X Malisse	6^{4}	6	6
6	(Germany) F Mayer	7^{7}	2	3

Semifinals
(Spain) G García López	6^{4}	1
3	(Belgium) X Malisse	7^{7}	6

=== Bottom half ===
First round
7	(Luxembourg) G Müller	7^{7}	6
Q	(Sweden) B Rehnquist	6^{4}	4
Q	(United States) J Salzenstein	7	7^{7}
(Romania) R Sabău	5	6^{5}
(France) O Patience	3	6^{4}
(Romania) A Pavel	6	7^{7}
(Russia) I Kunitsyn	6^{4}	2
4	(Germany) T Haas	7^{7}	6
8	(United States) V Spadea	5	6	6
(Taiwan) Y-T Wang	7	1	1
Q	(United States) R Kendrick	6	7
(United States) K Kim	4	5
WC	(United States) M Fish	3	3
(Germany) S Greul	6	6
(South Korea) H-T Lee	5	6	6
2	(United States) R Ginepri	7	2	4

Second round
7	(Luxembourg) G Müller	6	6
Q	(United States) J Salzenstein	3	4
(Romania) A Pavel	7^{7}	1	5
4	(Germany) T Haas	6^{1}	6	7
8	(United States) V Spadea	6	6
Q	(United States) R Kendrick	4	1
(Germany) S Greul	6	3	4
(South Korea) H-T Lee	2	6	6

Quarterfinals
7	(Luxembourg) G Müller	3	2
4	(Germany) T Haas	6	6
8	(United States) V Spadea	6	6
(South Korea) H-T Lee	3	3

Semifinals
4	(Germany) T Haas	6	6
8	(United States) V Spadea	3	2
