= Hugo Armando =

American tennis player

- Country (sports): United States
- Residence: Bradenton, Florida, US
- Born: May 27, 1978 (age 47) Miami, US
- Height: 6 ft 0 in (1.83 m)
- Turned pro: 1997
- Retired: 2008
- Plays: Right-handed (one-handed backhand)
- Prize money: $588,523

Singles
- Career record: 13–30
- Career titles: 0
- Highest ranking: No. 100 (August 6, 2001)

Grand Slam singles results
- Australian Open: Q1 (2008)
- French Open: 1R (2005)
- Wimbledon: Q3 (2008)
- US Open: 1R (2001)

Doubles
- Career record: 8–17
- Career titles: 1
- Highest ranking: No. 85 (February 5, 2007)

Grand Slam doubles results
- Australian Open: 1R (2008)
- Wimbledon: 1R (2008)
- US Open: 1R (2000)

Hugo Armando (born on May 27, 1978) is an American tennis coach and former professional tour tennis player. Since 2023 he has been coaching Venus Williams.

== ATP career finals ==
=== Doubles (1 title) ===
Legend (singles)
Grand Slam (0)
Tennis Masters Cup (0)
ATP Masters Series (0)
ATP Tour (1)

Result	W/L	Date	Tournament	Surface	Partner	Opponents	Score
Win	1–0	Feb 2007	Delray Beach, United States	Hard	(Belgium) Xavier Malisse	(United Kingdom) James Auckland (Australia) Stephen Huss	6–3, 6–7^{(4–7)}, [10–5]
