= Xavier Malisse =

Belgian tennis coach and former tennis player (1980)

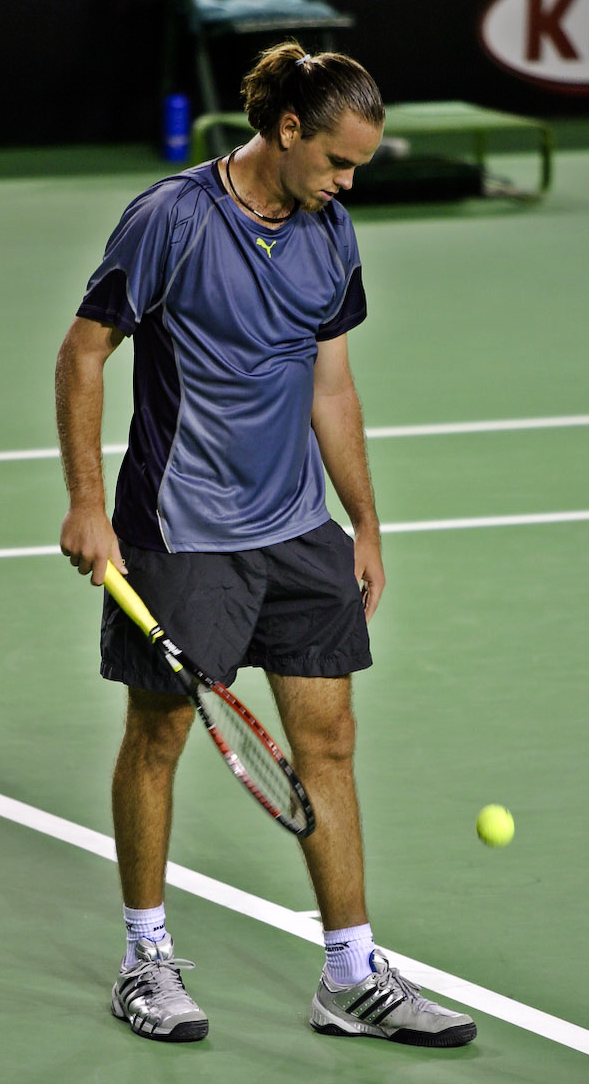
- Malisse at the 2005 Australian Open
- Country (sports): Belgium
- Residence: Sarasota, United States
- Born: 19 July 1980 (age 45) Kortrijk, Belgium
- Height: 1.85 m (6 ft 1 in)
- Turned pro: 1998
- Retired: 2013 (last doubles match 2022)
- Plays: Right-handed (two-handed backhand)
- Prize money: $5,702,871

Singles
- Career record: 294–274
- Career titles: 3
- Highest ranking: No. 19 (12 August 2002)

Grand Slam singles results
- Australian Open: 3R (2003, 2011)
- French Open: 4R (2002, 2004)
- Wimbledon: SF (2002)
- US Open: 4R (2001, 2003, 2005)

Other tournaments
- Olympic Games: 1R (2004)

Doubles
- Career record: 132–115
- Career titles: 9
- Highest ranking: No. 25 (7 November 2011)

Grand Slam doubles results
- Australian Open: 2R (2003–2006, 2011)
- French Open: W (2004)
- Wimbledon: 3R (2005)
- US Open: 2R (2003)
- Last updated on: 24 October 2022.

Xavier Malisse (born 19 July 1980) is a Belgian tennis coach and a former professional player. Born in the north-western Flemish city of Kortrijk and nicknamed X-Man, he is one of only two Belgian men (the other being David Goffin) to have been ranked in the top 20 of the ATP Tour, with a career-high singles ranking of world No. 19.

== Career ==
=== Juniors ===
As a junior Malisse compiled a singles win–loss record of 66–18, reaching as high as No. 10 in the junior world singles rankings in 1997. He made the quarterfinals of Wimbledon in 1997, whilst his final junior tournament was winning Eddie Herr later that year.

=== 1998–2008 ===
Malisse turned professional in 1998.

His best performance in Grand Slam singles competition was at the 2002 Wimbledon championships, where he reached the semi-final, beating Galo Blanco, Vince Spadea, Yevgeny Kafelnikov and Britain's Greg Rusedski in five sets en route, as well as former champion Richard Krajicek. He eventually lost to runner-up David Nalbandian, again in five sets. Malisse and Olivier Rochus won the French Open doubles championship in 2004. He has won three ATP tour singles titles: Delray Beach in 2005 and 2007, and Chennai in 2007.

=== 2009 ===
After a difficult year, Malisse found himself with a world ranking of 205. In his first tournament of the year in Brisbane, he lost in the last qualifying round to American Bobby Reynolds. A week later, in Medibank International Sydney, he reached the main draw, but lost to Mario Ančić in the first round.

At the Australian Open, he first won his qualifying matches. In the first round of the main draw, he defeated Michaël Llodra. However, in the next round, he lost to Andy Roddick in four sets. In October, he won a Challenger tournament in Lyon, and this pushed him back into the world's top 100 for the first time in nearly two years.

He was banned for a year over doping allegations.

=== 2010 ===
Malisse lost in the third round of Wimbledon to Sam Querrey in five sets.

=== 2011 ===
Xavier started the 2011 season by reaching the final of Chennai. In March, he won the doubles title in the Indian Wells Masters with Alexandr Dolgopolov of Ukraine. He reached the fourth round at Wimbledon, where he lost to Bernard Tomic.

=== 2012 ===
Xavier reached the fourth round of Wimbledon where he faced Roger Federer. Federer won the first two sets and went a break up in the third, but Malisse came back to win the third set and move 2–0 in the fourth. Federer subsequently won six out of the next seven games to win the match and went on to win the Title.

=== 2016–2018 ===
After retiring in 2013 and competing in an ITF doubles event in 2015, Malisse entered the 2016 Meerbusch Challenger in doubles, ultimately conceding a walkover to end his playing career. He then participated in the ATP Champions Tour until 2018.

=== 2021–2022 ===
Malisse came out of retirement to play doubles at the 2021 European Open having received a wildcard alongside Lloyd Harris whom he was coaching. The pair made the semifinals defeating top seeds Ivan Dodig and Marcelo Melo en route before losing to 3rd seeds Jean-Julien Rojer and Wesley Koolhof in straight sets.

He also participated in the 2022 European Open having received again a wildcard to play doubles with Diego Schwartzman. In the first round they managed to beat Raven Klaasen and Marcelo Melo in straight sets. In the quarterfinals, they lost to Botic van de Zandschulp and Tallon Griekspoor in two tie-breaks.

== Significant finals ==
=== Grand Slam finals ===
==== Doubles: 1 (1–0) ====
Result	Year	Championship	Surface	Partner	Opponents	Score
Win	2004	French Open	Clay	(Belgium) Olivier Rochus	(France) Michaël Llodra (France) Fabrice Santoro	7–5, 7–5

=== Masters 1000 finals ===
==== Doubles: 1 (1–0) ====
Result	Year	Tournament	Surface	Partner	Opponents	Score
Win	2011	Indian Wells	Hard	(Ukraine) Alexandr Dolgopolov	(Switzerland) Roger Federer (Switzerland) Stan Wawrinka	6–4, 6–7^{(5–7)}, [10–7]

== ATP career finals ==
=== Singles: 12 (3 titles, 9 runners-up) ===
Legend Grand Slam tournaments (0–0) Tennis Masters Cup / ATP World Tour Finals (0–0) ATP Masters Series / ATP World Tour Masters 1000 (0–0) ATP International Series Gold / ATP World Tour 500 Series (0–0) ATP International Series / ATP World Tour 250 Series (3–9)	Titles by surface Hard (3–4) Clay (0–4) Grass (0–0) Carpet (0–1)	Titles by setting Outdoor (3–8) Indoor (0–1)

Result	W–L	Date	Tournament	Tier	Surface	Opponent	Score
Loss	0–1	Nov 1998	Mexican Open, Mexico	World Series	Clay	(Czech Republic) Jiří Novák	3–6, 3–6
Loss	0–2	May 1999	Delray Beach ITC, US	World Series	Clay	(Australia) Lleyton Hewitt	4–6, 7–6^{(7–2)}, 1–6
Loss	0–3	Mar 2001	Delray Beach ITC, US	International	Hard	(United States) Jan-Michael Gambill	5–7, 4–6
Loss	0–4	Apr 2001	Atlanta Tennis Challenge, US	International	Clay	(United States) Andy Roddick	2–6, 4–6
Loss	0–5	May 2004	St. Pölten Open, Austria	International	Clay	(Italy) Filippo Volandri	1–6, 4–6
Loss	0–6	Oct 2004	Grand Prix de Tennis de Lyon, France	International	Carpet (i)	(Sweden) Robin Söderling	2–6, 6–3, 4–6
Win	1–6	Jan 2005	Delray Beach ITC, US	International	Hard	(Czech Republic) Jiří Novák	7–6^{(8–6)}, 6–2
Loss	1–7	Jan 2006	Adelaide International, Australia	International	Hard	(France) Florent Serra	3–6, 4–6
Loss	1–8	Feb 2006	Delray Beach ITC, US	International	Hard	(Germany) Tommy Haas	3–6, 6–3, 6–7^{(5–7)}
Win	2–8	Jan 2007	Chennai Open, India	International	Hard	(Austria) Stefan Koubek	6–1, 6–3
Win	3–8	Feb 2007	Delray Beach ITC, US (2)	International	Hard	(United States) James Blake	5–7, 6–4, 6–4
Loss	3–9	Jan 2011	Chennai Open, India	250 Series	Hard	(Switzerland) Stanislas Wawrinka	5–7, 6–4, 1–6

=== Doubles: 13 (9 titles, 4 runners-up) ===
Legend Grand Slam tournaments (1–0) Tennis Masters Cup / ATP World Tour Finals (0–0) ATP Masters Series / ATP World Tour Masters 1000 (1–0) ATP International Series Gold / ATP World Tour 500 Series (0–0) ATP International Series / ATP World Tour 250 Series (7–4)	Titles by surface Hard (8–3) Clay (1–1) Grass (0–0) Carpet (0–0)	Titles by setting Outdoor (7–3) Indoor (2–1)

Result	W–L	Date	Tournament	Tier	Surface	Partner	Opponents	Score
Win	1–0	Jun 2004	French Open, France	Grand Slam	Clay	(Belgium) Olivier Rochus	(France) Michaël Llodra (France) Fabrice Santoro	7–5, 7–5
Win	2–0	Jan 2005	Adelaide International, Australia	International	Hard	(Belgium) Olivier Rochus	(Sweden) Simon Aspelin (Australia) Todd Perry	7–6^{(7–5)}, 6–4
Win	3–0	Jan 2007	Chennai Open, India	International	Hard	(Belgium) Dick Norman	(Spain) Rafael Nadal (Spain) Bartolomé Salvá Vidal	7–6^{(7–4)}, 7–6^{(7–4)}
Win	4–0	Feb 2007	Delray Beach ITC, US	International	Hard	(United States) Hugo Armando	(United Kingdom) James Auckland (Australia) Stephen Huss	6–3, 6–7^{(4–7)}, [10–5]
Loss	4–1	Jan 2008	Auckland Open, New Zealand	International	Hard	(Austria) Jürgen Melzer	(Peru) Luis Horna (Argentina) Juan Mónaco	4–6, 6–3, [7–10]
Loss	4–2	Feb 2011	Pacific Coast Championships, US	250 Series	Hard (i)	(Colombia) Alejandro Falla	(United States) Scott Lipsky (United States) Rajeev Ram	4–6, 6–4, [8–10]
Win	5–2	Mar 2011	Indian Wells Masters, US	Masters 1000	Hard	(Ukraine) Alexandr Dolgopolov	(Switzerland) Roger Federer (Switzerland) Stanislas Wawrinka	6–4, 6–7^{(5–7)}, [10–7]
Win	6–2	Jul 2011	Los Angeles Open, US	250 Series	Hard	(The Bahamas) Mark Knowles	(India) Somdev Devvarman (Philippines) Treat Huey	7–6^{(7–3)}, 7–6^{(12–10)}
Win	7–2	Feb 2012	Pacific Coast Championships, US	250 Series	Hard (i)	(The Bahamas) Mark Knowles	(South Africa) Kevin Anderson (Germany) Frank Moser	6–4, 1–6, [10–5]
Loss	7–3	May 2012	Bavarian Championships, Germany	250 Series	Clay	(Belgium) Dick Norman	(Czech Republic) František Čermák (Slovakia) Filip Polášek	4–6, 5–7
Loss	7–4	Jul 2012	Atlanta Open, US	250 Series	Hard	(United States) Michael Russell	(Australia) Matthew Ebden (United States) Ryan Harrison	3–6, 6–3, [6–10]
Win	8–4	Jul 2012	Los Angeles Open, US (2)	250 Series	Hard	(Belgium) Ruben Bemelmans	(United Kingdom) Jamie Delgado (United Kingdom) Ken Skupski	7–6^{(7–5)}, 4–6, [10–7]
Win	9–4	Feb 2013	Pacific Coast Championships, US (2)	250 Series	Hard (i)	(Germany) Frank Moser	(Australia) Lleyton Hewitt (Australia) Marinko Matosevic	6–0, 6–7^{(5–7)}, [10–4]

== ATP Challenger and ITF Futures finals ==
=== Singles: 7 (4–3) ===
Legend ATP Challenger (4–3) ITF Futures (0–0)	Finals by surface Hard (4–3) Clay (0–0) Grass (0–0) Carpet (0–0)

Result	W–L	Date	Tournament	Tier	Surface	Opponent	Score
Win	1–0	Oct 2000	San Antonio, United States	Challenger	Hard	(Haiti) Ronald Agénor	7–6^{(7–3)}, 6–3
Loss	1–1	Oct 2005	Mons, Belgium	Challenger	Hard	(Belgium) Olivier Rochus	2–6, 0–6
Win	2–1	Jul 2008	Moncton, Canada	Challenger	Hard	(Thailand) Danai Udomchoke	6–4, 6–4
Win	3–1	Aug 2009	Granby, Canada	Challenger	Hard	(South Africa) Kevin Anderson	6–4, 6–4
Loss	3–2	Aug 2009	Vancouver, Canada	Challenger	Hard	(Cyprus) Marcos Baghdatis	4–6, 4–6
Loss	3–3	Sep 2009	St. Remy, France	Challenger	Hard	(Cyprus) Marcos Baghdatis	4–6, 1–6
Win	4–3	Oct 2009	Orleans, France	Challenger	Hard	(France) Stéphane Robert	6–1, 6–2

=== Doubles: 4 (2–2) ===
Legend ATP Challenger (2–2) ITF Futures (0–0)	Finals by surface Hard (1–1) Clay (1–1) Grass (0–0) Carpet (0–0)

Result	W–L	Date	Tournament	Tier	Surface	Partner	Opponents	Score
Loss	0–1	Jul 1999	Ostend, Belgium	Challenger	Clay	(Belgium) Wim Neefs	(South Africa) Marcos Ondruska (Australia) Steven Randjelovic	2–6, 4–6
Win	1–1	Jul 2008	Bogotá, Colombia	Challenger	Clay	(Colombia) Carlos Salamanca	(Colombia) Juan Sebastián Cabal (Colombia) Michael Quintero	6–1, 6–4
Win	2–1	Sep 2008	Donetsk, Ukraine	Challenger	Hard	(Belgium) Dick Norman	(Israel) Harel Levy (Israel) Noam Okun	4–6, 6–1, [13–11]
Loss	2–2	Sep 2012	Orleans, France	Challenger	Hard	(United Kingdom) Ken Skupski	(Czech Republic) Lukáš Dlouhý (Luxembourg) Gilles Müller	2–6, 7–6^{(7–5)}, [7–10]

== Performance timelines ==
Key
W	F	SF	QF	#R	RR	Q#	P#	DNQ	A	Z#	PO	G	S	B	NMS	NTI	P	NH

(W) winner; (F) finalist; (SF) semifinalist; (QF) quarterfinalist; (#R) rounds 4, 3, 2, 1; (RR) round-robin stage; (Q#) qualification round; (P#) preliminary round; (DNQ) did not qualify; (A) absent; (Z#) Davis/Fed Cup Zonal Group (with number indication) or (PO) play-off; (G) gold, (S) silver or (B) bronze Olympic/Paralympic medal; (NMS) not a Masters tournament; (NTI) not a Tier I tournament; (P) postponed; (NH) not held; (SR) strike rate (events won / competed); (W–L) win–loss record.

=== Singles ===
Tournament	1998	1999	2000	2001	2002	2003	2004	2005	2006	2007	2008	2009	2010	2011	2012	2013	W–L
Grand Slam tournaments
Australian Open	A	A	A	A	2R	3R	1R	1R	2R	1R	1R	2R	1R	3R	1R	2R	8–12
French Open	A	1R	A	3R	4R	3R	4R	2R	1R	A	A	A	2R	2R	1R	1R	13–11
Wimbledon	A	1R	A	2R	SF	1R	4R	2R	2R	A	2R	1R	3R	4R	4R	1R	20–13
US Open	A	3R	2R	4R	3R	4R	1R	4R	3R	2R	Q1	Q1	1R	1R	1R	1R	17–13
Win–loss	0–0	2–3	1–1	6–3	11–4	7–4	6–4	5–4	4–4	1–2	1–2	1–2	3–4	6–4	3–4	1–4	58–49
ATP Masters Series
Indian Wells Masters	A	3R	A	A	1R	2R	2R	1R	3R	A	2R	A	A	3R	2R	1R	10–10
Miami Masters	A	1R	2R	A	1R	2R	3R	2R	2R	A	3R	A	1R	2R	2R	3R	10–12
Monte Carlo Masters	A	A	A	A	1R	1R	1R	2R	1R	A	1R	A	A	1R	A	1R	1–8
Rome Masters	A	A	A	A	3R	1R	A	A	2R	A	A	A	A	2R	Q2	1R	4–5
Madrid Masters	A	A	A	A	2R	A	1R	A	1R	A	A	A	A	3R	A	1R	3–5
Canada Masters	A	A	A	1R	1R	1R	1R	3R	QF	A	A	A	2R	A	A	1R	6–8
Cincinnati Masters	A	1R	A	2R	3R	2R	1R	1R	1R	A	A	A	A	1R	A	A	4–8
Shanghai Masters	Not Masters Series											A	A	A	A	A	0–0
Paris Masters	A	A	A	3R	2R	A	2R	1R	1R	A	A	A	1R	A	A	A	4–6
Hamburg Masters	A	A	A	A	1R	2R	1R	A	1R	A	1R	NMS					1–5
Win–loss	0–0	2–3	1–1	3–3	6–9	3–7	4–8	3–6	7–9	0–0	3–4	0–0	1–3	6–6	2–2	2–6	43–67
Career statistics
Titles–Finals	0–1	0–1	0–0	0–2	0–0	0–0	0–2	1–1	0–2	2–2	0–0	0–0	0–0	0–1	0–0	0–0	3–12
Year-end ranking	161	145	127	33	25	55	48	47	37	112	162	94	60	49	47	135	

=== Doubles ===
Tournament	2003	2004	2005	2006	2007	2008	2009	2010	2011	2012	2013	W–L
Grand Slam tournaments
Australian Open	2R	2R	2R	2R	1R	1R	A	A	2R	1R	2R	6–9
French Open	2R	W	3R	QF	A	A	A	1R	2R	3R	1R	15–7
Wimbledon	2R	2R	3R	A	A	A	A	1R	A	1R	2R	5–6
US Open	2R	1R	A	1R	A	A	A	1R	3R	1R	1R	3–7
Win–loss	4–4	8–3	5–3	4–3	0–1	0–1	0–0	0–3	4–3	2–4	2–4	29–29

== Top 10 wins ==
Season	1998	1999	2000	2001	2002	2003	2004	2005	2006	2007	2008	2009	2010	2011	2012	2013	Total
Wins	0	0	0	2	3	1	1	0	2	2	1	0	2	0	1	1	16

#	Player	Rank	Event	Surface	Rd	Score
2001
1.	(Russia) Marat Safin	2	Los Angeles, United States	Hard	2R	7–5, 6–3
2.	(United Kingdom) Tim Henman	9	US Open, New York, United States	Hard	3R	6–7^{(6–8)}, 6–3, 7–5, 4–6, 6–4
2002
3.	(Russia) Marat Safin	6	Rome, Italy	Clay	2R	6–3, 6–4
4.	(United Kingdom) Tim Henman	6	French Open, Paris, France	Clay	2R	6–2, 3–6, 7–6^{(7–4)}, 6–3
5.	(Russia) Yevgeny Kafelnikov	6	Wimbledon, London, United Kingdom	Grass	3R	7–6^{(7–4)}, 7–5, 6–1
2003
6.	(Australia) Lleyton Hewitt	6	Cincinnati, United States	Hard	1R	3–6, 6–4, 6–2
2004
7.	(Germany) Rainer Schüttler	7	French Open, Paris, France	Clay	1R	6–4, 7–5, 6–4
2006
8.	(Argentina) Gastón Gaudio	8	Rome, Italy	Clay	1R	4–6, 6–3, 6–3
9.	(Russia) Nikolay Davydenko	5	Toronto, Canada	Hard	1R	6–3, 7–5
2007
10.	(Spain) Rafael Nadal	2	Chennai, India	Hard	SF	6–4, 7–6^{(7–4)}
11.	(United States) James Blake	6	Delray Beach, United States	Hard	F	5–7, 6–4, 6–4
2008
12.	(Argentina) David Nalbandian	7	Miami, United States	Hard	2R	6–1, 6–4
2010
13.	(Serbia) Novak Djokovic	3	Queen's Club, London, United Kingdom	Grass	3R	6–3, 4–6, 6–2
14.	(Czech Republic) Tomáš Berdych	8	Washington, D.C., United States	Hard	QF	6–4, 3–6, 6–2
2012
15.	(France) Jo-Wilfried Tsonga	7	Valencia, Spain	Hard (i)	1R	3–1, ret.
2013
16.	(Spain) David Ferrer	4	Rosmalen, Netherlands	Grass	1R	7–6^{(7–3)}, 6–3
