= 2000 Brighton International – Doubles =

Doubles
- 2000 Brighton International

Final
- Champions: (Australia) Michael Hill (United States) Jeff Tarango
- Runners-up: (United States) Paul Goldstein (United States) Jim Thomas
- Score: 6–3, 7–5

Events
Singles	Doubles
← 1999 ·	Brighton International

David Adams and Jeff Tarango were the defending champions, but played in this year with different partners.

Adams teamed up with Diego Nargiso and lost in first round to Cristian Brandi and Aleksandar Kitinov.

Tarango teamed up with Michael Hill and successfully defended his title, by defeating Paul Goldstein and Jim Thomas 6–3, 7–5 in the final.

== Seeds ==
A champion seed is indicated in bold text while text in italics indicates the round in which that seed was eliminated.

1. (South Africa) David Adams / (Italy) Diego Nargiso (first round, retired)
2. **(Australia) Michael Hill / (United States) Jeff Tarango (champions)**
3. (South Africa) Marius Barnard / (South Africa) Robbie Koenig (first round)
4. (South Africa) Brent Haygarth / (United States) Jack Waite (first round)

== Draw ==
=== Key ===
- Q = Qualifier
- WC = Wild card
- LL = Lucky loser
- Alt = Alternate
- SE = Special exempt
- PR = Protected ranking
- ITF = ITF entry
- JE = Junior exempt
- w/o = Walkover
- r = Retired
- d = Defaulted
- SR = Special ranking

=== Draw ===
First round
1	(South Africa) D Adams (Italy) D Nargiso	2^{r}
**(Italy) C Brandi** **(North Macedonia) A Kitinov**	2
WC	(United Kingdom) B Cowan (United Kingdom) J Delgado	4	3
**(United States) P Goldstein** **(United States) J Thomas**	**6**	**6**
3	(South Africa) M Barnard (South Africa) R Koenig	6^{7}	6^{5}
**(Croatia) G Ivanišević** **(Croatia) I Ljubičić**	**7^{9}**	**7^{7}**
**(South Africa) P Rosner** **(South Africa) J Weir-Smith**	**6**	**7^{8}**
WC	(United Kingdom) L Childs (United Kingdom) J Nelson	2	6^{6}
**(Germany) L Burgsmüller** **(Israel) J Erlich**	**6**	**6**
(Czech Republic) P Kovačka (Czech Republic) P Kudrnáč	2	4
WC	**(Germany) MK Goellner** **(United Kingdom) G Rusedski**	**6**	**6**
4	(South Africa) B Haygarth (United States) J Waite	3	2
Q	(United Kingdom) J Davidson (United Kingdom) O Freelove	3	4
**(United States) D Bowen** **(United States) C Woodruff**	**6**	**6**
(Israel) E Ran (Spain) J Velasco Jr.	5	3
2	**(Australia) M Hill** **(United States) J Tarango**	**7**	**6**

Quarterfinals
(Italy) C Brandi (North Macedonia) A Kitinov	5	6^{4}
**(United States) P Goldstein** **(United States) J Thomas**	**7**	**7^{7}**
(Croatia) G Ivanišević (Croatia) I Ljubičić	6^{3}	**6**	6^{5}
**(South Africa) P Rosner** **(South Africa) J Weir-Smith**	**7^{7}**	3	**7^{7}**
(Germany) L Burgsmüller (Israel) J Erlich	3	6^{8}
WC	**(Germany) MK Goellner** **(United Kingdom) G Rusedski**	**6**	**7^{10}**
(United States) D Bowen (United States) C Woodruff	**6**	3	5
2	**(Australia) M Hill** **(United States) J Tarango**	3	**6**	**7**

Semifinals
**(United States) P Goldstein** **(United States) J Thomas**	5	**7**	**6**
(South Africa) P Rosner (South Africa) J Weir-Smith	**7**	5	3
WC	(Germany) MK Goellner (United Kingdom) G Rusedski	3	2
2	**(Australia) M Hill** **(United States) J Tarango**	**6**	**6**

Final
(United States) P Goldstein (United States) J Thomas	3	5
2	**(Australia) M Hill** **(United States) J Tarango**	**6**	**7**
