= 2000 Hall of Fame Tennis Championships =

- Date: July 10–16
- Edition: 25th
- Category: ATP International Series
- Draw: 32S / 16D
- Prize money: $350,000
- Surface: Grass / outdoor
- Location: Newport, Rhode Island, US
- Venue: Newport Casino

Champions

Singles
- (Netherlands) Peter Wessels

Doubles
- (Israel) Jonathan Erlich / (Israel) Harel Levy
← 1999 ·	Hall of Fame Tennis Championships	· 2001 →

The 2000 Hall of Fame Tennis Championships (also known as 2000 Miller Lite Hall of Fame Championships for sponsorship reasons) was a tennis tournament played on grass courts at the International Tennis Hall of Fame in Newport, Rhode Island in the United States and was part of the ATP International Series of the 2000 ATP Tour. It was the 25th edition of the tournament and was held from July 10 through July 16, 2000.

== Finals ==
=== Singles ===
(Netherlands) Peter Wessels defeated (Germany) Jens Knippschild 7–6^{(7–3)}, 6–3

- It was Wessels' only singles title of his career.

=== Doubles ===
(Israel) Jonathan Erlich / (Israel) Harel Levy defeated (United Kingdom) Kyle Spencer / (United States) Mitch Sprengelmeyer 7–6^{(7–2)}, 7–5
