= Daniel Fiala =

Czech tennis player (born 1972)

- Country (sports): Czech Republic
- Born: 24 June 1972 (age 52)
- Prize money: $15,775

Singles
- Highest ranking: No. 409 (29 Apr 1996)

Doubles
- Career record: 0–2
- Highest ranking: No. 236 (6 Jun 1994)

Daniel Fiala (born 24 June 1972) is a Czech former professional tennis player.

Active on tour in the 1990s, Fiala reached career best rankings of 409 in singles and 236 in doubles. He made two ATP Tour doubles main draw appearances at the Czech Indoor tournament in Ostrava and was a four-time doubles finalist on the ATP Challenger Tour. After retiring he became a coach and has coached WTA Tour player Libuše Průšová.

== ATP Challenger/ITF Futures finals ==
=== Doubles: 7 (3–4) ===
Legend
ATP Challenger (0–4)
ITF Futures (3–0)

Result	W–L	Date	Tournament	Tier	Surface	Partner	Opponents	Score
Loss	0–1	Aug 1992	Liège Challenger, Liège	Challenger	Clay	(Czechoslovakia) Robert Novotny	(Spain) Juan Carlos Báguena (Belgium) Eduardo Masso	2–6, 3–6
Loss	0–2	Jun 1994	Tashkent Challenger, Tashkent	Challenger	Clay	(Czech Republic) Jan Kodeš Jr.	(Morocco) Karim Alami (Hungary) Sándor Noszály	7–6, 4–6, 6–7
Win	1–0	May 1998	Yugoslavia F3, Belgrade	Futures	Clay	(Australia) Dejan Petrović	(Slovakia) Vladimír Pláteník (Australia) Joseph Sirianni	6–3, 5–7, 6–3
Win	2–0	Jun 1998	Yugoslavia F3A, Niš	Futures	Clay	(Australia) Dejan Petrović	(Austria) Matey Pampulov (Brazil) Paulo Taicher	W/O
Win	3–0	Jun 1998	Yugoslavia F3B, Zaječar	Futures	Clay	(Australia) Dejan Petrović	(Hungary) Miklós Jancsó (Hungary) Gábor Jaross	6–1, 3–6, 6–3
Loss	0–3	Aug 1999	Sopot Challenger, Sopot	Challenger	Clay	(Czech Republic) Jiri Hobler	(Poland) Bartłomiej Dąbrowski (Poland) Michał Gawłowski	4–6, 6–3, 3–6
Loss	0–4	Sep 1999	Budapest Challenger, Budapest	Challenger	Clay	(Czech Republic) Leoš Friedl	(Israel) Harel Levy (Israel) Noam Okun	4–6, 6–4, 2–6
