= 1999 Bournemouth International – Doubles =

Doubles
- 1999 Bournemouth International

Final
- Champions: (South Africa) David Adams (United States) Jeff Tarango
- Runners-up: (Germany) Michael Kohlmann (Sweden) Nicklas Kulti
- Score: 6–3, 6–7^{(5–7)}, 7–6^{(7–5)}

Events
Singles	Doubles
← 1998 ·	Bournemouth International	· 2000 →

Neil Broad and Kevin Ullyett were the defending champions, but lost in semifinals to Michael Kohlmann and Nicklas Kulti.

David Adams and Jeff Tarango won the title by defeating Michael Kohlmann and Nicklas Kulti 6–3, 6–7^{(5–7)}, 7–6^{(7–5)} in the final.

== Seeds ==
1. (South Africa) David Adams / (United States) Jeff Tarango (champions)
2. (United Kingdom) Neil Broad / (Zimbabwe) Kevin Ullyett (semifinals)
3. (Germany) Michael Kohlmann / (Sweden) Nicklas Kulti (final)
4. (United States) Devin Bowen / (Argentina) Mariano Hood (semifinals)

== Draw ==
=== Key ===
- Q = Qualifier
- WC = Wild card
- LL = Lucky loser
- Alt = Alternate
- SE = Special exempt
- PR = Protected ranking
- ITF = ITF entry
- JE = Junior exempt
- w/o = Walkover
- r = Retired
- d = Defaulted
- SR = Special ranking

=== Draw ===
First round
1	(South Africa) D Adams (United States) J Tarango	7	7
(United Kingdom) J Davidson (Italy) V Santopadre	5	5
(Morocco) K Alami (Belgium) T Vanhoudt	7	4	6
(Italy) M Ardinghi (Italy) D Sanguinetti	6	6	4
4	(United States) D Bowen (Argentina) M Hood	6	6
(Germany) MK Goellner (United States) F Montana	4	3
WC	(United Kingdom) M Maclagan (United Kingdom) K Spencer	6	3	6
WC	(United Kingdom) S Dickson (United Kingdom) L Milligan	1	6	1
(South Africa) M Barnard (United States) J Waite	6	6
WC	(United Kingdom) D Sherwood (United Kingdom) T Spinks	1	1
(United States) B Coupe (South Africa) B Haygarth	3	4
3	(Germany) M Kohlmann (Sweden) N Kulti	6	6
(Argentina) G Etlis (Spain) Á López Morón	0	6	7
Q	(Italy) A Gaudenzi (Italy) D Nargiso	6	3	6
WC	(United Kingdom) J Delgado (United Kingdom) M Lee	3	6	2
2	(United Kingdom) N Broad (Zimbabwe) K Ullyett	6	3	6

Quarterfinals
1	(South Africa) D Adams (United States) J Tarango	6	6
(Morocco) K Alami (Belgium) T Vanhoudt	3	4
4	(United States) D Bowen (Argentina) M Hood	6	3	6
WC	(United Kingdom) M Maclagan (United Kingdom) K Spencer	1	6	2
(South Africa) M Barnard (United States) J Waite	2	4
3	(Germany) M Kohlmann (Sweden) N Kulti	6	6
(Argentina) G Etlis (Spain) Á López Morón	0	1
2	(United Kingdom) N Broad (Zimbabwe) K Ullyett	6	6

Semifinals
1	(South Africa) D Adams (United States) J Tarango	6	6
4	(United States) D Bowen (Argentina) M Hood	2	2
3	(Germany) M Kohlmann (Sweden) N Kulti	2	7	7
2	(United Kingdom) N Broad (Zimbabwe) K Ullyett	6	5	6

Final
1	(South Africa) D Adams (United States) J Tarango	6	6^{5}	7^{7}
3	(Germany) M Kohlmann (Sweden) N Kulti	3	7^{7}	6^{5}
