= James Nelson (tennis) =

British tennis player (born 1982)

- Full name: James Nelson
- Country (sports): Great Britain
- Born: 18 February 1982 (age 43) Newcastle, England, United Kingdom
- Plays: Right-handed
- Prize money: $30,864

Singles
- Career record: 0–0
- Career titles: 0; 0 Challenger, 0 futures
- Highest ranking: No. 590 (14 May 2001)

Grand Slam singles results
- Wimbledon: Q2 (2000)

Doubles
- Career record: 0–3
- Career titles: 0; 0 Challenger, 4 futures
- Highest ranking: No. 323 (22 July 2002)

Grand Slam doubles results
- Wimbledon: 1R (2000, 2001)

Grand Slam mixed doubles results
- Wimbledon: 1R (2001)
- Last updated on: 22 December 2021.

James Nelson (born 18 February 1982) is a British former professional tennis player.

== Biography ==
A right-handed player from Newcastle, Nelson won the boys' doubles title at the 2000 US Open, partnering Lee Childs. It was the first title won by British players at the US Open for 32 years. The two players finished 2000 as the top ranked pair in the ITF year-end doubles rankings.

His only main draw appearance on the ATP Tour came in the doubles at the 2000 Brighton International.

Nelson played in the main draw of Wimbledon in both 2000 and 2001. At the 2000 Wimbledon Championships he was a wildcard pairing with Mark Hilton and they were beaten in a four-set first round match by Czechs Petr Pála and Pavel Vízner. He received another opportunity to compete in the men's doubles at the 2001 Wimbledon Championships, but he and partner Lee Childs were unable to get past their first round opponents, the Bryan brothers. Partnering Helen Crook, he also featured in the mixed doubles draw.

He retired from professional tennis at the age of 20.

== Junior Grand Slam finals ==
=== Doubles: 1 (1 title) ===
Result	Year	Tournament	Surface	Partner	Opponents	Score
Win	2000	US Open	Hard	(United Kingdom) Lee Childs	(United States) Robby Ginepri (United States) Tres Davis	6–2, 6–4

== ATP Challenger and ITF Futures finals ==
=== Doubles: 8 (4–4) ===
Legend ATP Challenger (0–0) ITF Futures (4–4)	Finals by surface Hard (4–2) Clay (0–1) Grass (0–0) Carpet (0–1)

Result	W–L	Date	Tournament	Tier	Surface	Partner	Opponents	Score
Win	1–0	Oct 2000	Great Britain F11, Leeds	Futures	Hard	(United Kingdom) Lee Childs	(United Kingdom) James Auckland (United Kingdom) Barry Fulcher	5–4^{(6–4)}, 5–3, 2–4, 4–2
Loss	1–1	Jan 2001	India F1, Jorhat	Futures	Clay	(United Kingdom) Oliver Freelove	(India) Fazaluddin Syed (Uzbekistan) Dmitriy Tomashevich	6–2, 5–7, 4–6
Loss	1–2	Feb 2001	Grsaat Britain F1, Nottingham	Futures	Carpet	(United Kingdom) Lee Childs	(United Kingdom) Oliver Freelove (United Kingdom) James Davidson	4–6, 7–6^{(7–4)}, 6–7^{(1–7)},
Win	2–2	Aug 2001	Great Britain F6, Bath	Futures	Hard	(United Kingdom) Simon Dickson	(France) Benjamin Cassaigne (France) Julien Couly	6–1, 7–6^{(7–2)}
Win	3–2	Aug 2001	Great Britain F7, Cumberland	Futures	Hard	(United Kingdom) Simon Dickson	(Republic of Ireland) John Doran (United States) Alex Witt	7–6^{(7–3)}, 6–1
Win	4–2	Sep 2001	Great Britain F9, Sunderland	Futures	Hard	(United Kingdom) Simon Dickson	(Canada) Dominic Boulet (Germany) Sebastian Fitz	2–6, 7–5, 7–5
Loss	4–3	Oct 2001	Grsaat Britain F11, Leeds	Futures	Hard	(United Kingdom) Simon Dickson	(Czech Republic) Jaroslav Levinsky (Croatia) Lovro Zovko	5–7, 4–6
Loss	4–4	Oct 2002	Grsaat Britain F10, Jersey	Futures	Hard	(United Kingdom) Simon Dickson	(South Africa) Wesley Moodie (Austria) Luben Pampoulov	3–6, 2–6
