= 1999 ATP Challenger Series =

Tennis tour

Details
- Duration: 25 January 1999 – 12 December 1999
- Edition: 22nd
- Tournaments: 115

Achievements (singles)

The ATP Challenger Series is the second tier tour for professional tennis organised by the Association of Tennis Professionals (ATP). The 1999 ATP Challenger Series calendar comprised 115 tournaments, with prize money ranging from $25,000 up to $125,000.

== Schedule ==
=== January ===
Date	Country	Tournament	Prizemoney	Surface	Singles champion	Doubles champions
25.01.	Germany	Heilbronn Open	$ 100,000	Carpet (i)	(Italy) Laurence Tieleman	(Germany) Michael Kohlmann (Switzerland) Filippo Veglio

=== February ===
Date	Country	Tournament	Prizemoney	Surface	Singles champion	Doubles champions
01.02.	United States	Amarillo Challenger	$ 50,000	Hard (i)	(Romania) Gabriel Trifu	(United States) Bob Bryan (United States) Mike Bryan
01.02.	India	Kolkata Challenger	$ 50,000	Grass	(India) Leander Paes	(Israel) Noam Behr (Israel) Eyal Ran
01.02.	Germany	Warsteiner Challenger	$ 25,000	Carpet (i)	(Belarus) Vladimir Voltchkov	(Germany) Michael Kohlmann (Switzerland) Filippo Veglio
01.02.	Uruguay	Punta del Este Challenger	$ 25,000	Clay	(Argentina) Marcelo Charpentier	(Argentina) Lucas Arnold Ker (Uruguay) Marcelo Filippini
08.02.	India	Lucknow Challenger I	$ 50,000	Grass	(Finland) Tuomas Ketola	(Portugal) Nuno Marques (Belgium) Tom Vanhoudt
08.02.	Germany	Volkswagen Challenger	$ 25,000	Carpet (i)	(Germany) Axel Pretzsch	(Brazil) Adriano Ferreira (Venezuela) Maurice Ruah
15.02.	Germany	Warsteiner Challenger Lübeck	$ 25,000	Carpet (i)	(Germany) Axel Pretzsch	(Germany) Franz Stauder (Germany) Patrick Sommer
22.02.	Vietnam	Ho Chi Minh Challenger	$ 50,000	Hard	(Netherlands) John van Lottum	(Spain) Juan Ignacio Carrasco (Spain) Jairo Velasco Jr.
22.02.	United States	Laguna Hills Challenger	$ 50,000	Hard	(Canada) Sébastien Lareau	(United States) Paul Goldstein (United States) Brian MacPhie
22.02.	France	Cherbourg Challenger	$ 37.500	Hard (i)	(France) Sébastien Grosjean	(Australia) Michael Hill (Australia) Andrew Painter

=== March ===
Date	Country	Tournament	Prizemoney	Surface	Singles champion	Doubles champions
01.03.	Singapore	Singapore Challenger	$ 50,000	Hard	(Italy) Mosé Navarra	(South Africa) Jeff Coetzee (South Africa) Damien Roberts
01.03.	France	Grenoble Challenger	$ 37.500	Hard (i)	(France) Julien Boutter	(United States) Adam Peterson (United States) Chris Tontz
01.03.	Germany	Residenza Open Magdeburg	$ 25,000	Carpet (i)	(Germany) Markus Hantschk	(Australia) Michael Hill (Australia) Andrew Painter
08.03.	Ecuador	Salinas Challenger	$ 75,000	Hard	(Argentina) Juan Ignacio Chela	(Argentina) Mariano Hood (Argentina) Sebastián Prieto
08.03.	France	Besançon Challenger	$ 25,000	Hard (i)	(Croatia) Ivan Ljubičić	(Spain) Juan Ignacio Carrasco (Spain) Jairo Velasco Jr.
08.03.	Japan	Kyoto Challenger	$ 25,000	Carpet (i)	(Austria) Julian Knowle	(Austria) Julian Knowle (Switzerland) Lorenzo Manta
29.03.	Italy	Barletta Challenger	$ 25,000	Clay	(Spain) Jacobo Díaz	(Argentina) Guillermo Cañas (Spain) Javier Sánchez

=== April ===
Date	Country	Tournament	Prizemoney	Surface	Singles champion	Doubles champions
05.04.	Italy	Napoli Challenger	$ 100,000	Clay	(Spain) Juan Carlos Ferrero	(South Africa) Marcos Ondruska (United States) Jack Waite
12.04.	Bermuda	XL Bermuda Open	$ 100,000	Clay	(Argentina) Hernán Gumy	(United States) Doug Flach (United States) Richey Reneberg
12.04.	France	Nice Challenger	$ 100,000	Clay	(Argentina) Gastón Gaudio	(Argentina) Martín García (Argentina) Sebastián Prieto
12.04.	India	New Delhi Challenger	$ 25,000	Hard	(India) Leander Paes	(Israel) Noam Behr (Israel) Eyal Ran
26.04.	Portugal	Espinho Challenger	$ 125,000	Clay	(Argentina) Gastón Gaudio	(Spain) Joan Balcells (Argentina) Gastón Etlis

=== May ===
Date	Country	Tournament	Prizemoney	Surface	Singles champion	Doubles champions
03.05.	Slovenia	Ljubljana Challenger	$ 125,000	Clay	(Belarus) Vladimir Voltchkov	(Italy) Massimo Valeri (Belgium) Tom Vanhoudt
10.05.	United States	Birmingham Challenger	$ 50,000	Clay	(Brazil) Francisco Costa	(United States) Bob Bryan (United States) Mike Bryan
10.05.	Israel	Jerusalem Challenger	$ 50,000	Hard	(Israel) Lior Mor	(South Africa) Jeff Coetzee (Finland) Tuomas Ketola
24.05.	Bulgaria	Sofia Challenger II	$ 25,000	Clay	(Germany) Marcello Craca	(Germany) Karsten Braasch (Germany) Tomas Behrend
31.05.	Czech Republic	Prostějov Challenger	$ 125,000	Clay	(Australia) Richard Fromberg	(Romania) Dinu Pescariu (United States) Eric Taino
31.05.	Germany	Quelle Cup	$ 50,000	Clay	(Haiti) Ronald Agénor	(Federal Republic of Yugoslavia) Nebojša Đorđević (South Africa) Marcos Ondruska
31.05.	Great Britain	Surbiton Challenger	$ 50,000	Grass	(Armenia) Sargis Sargsian	(Australia) Scott Draper (Australia) Todd Woodbridge

=== June ===
Date	Country	Tournament	Prizemoney	Surface	Singles champion	Doubles champions
07.06.	Portugal	Maia Challenger	$ 125,000	Clay	(Spain) Juan Carlos Ferrero	(Argentina) Mariano Hood (Argentina) Sebastián Prieto
07.06.	Germany	ATU Cup	$ 75,000	Clay	(Spain) Roberto Carretero	(Spain) Emilio Benfele Álvarez (Federal Republic of Yugoslavia) Dušan Vemić
14.06.	Germany	Nord/LB Open	$ 125,000	Clay	(Germany) Jens Knippschild	(Spain) Albert Portas (Spain) Germán Puentes
14.06.	Croatia	Zagreb Challenger	$ 50,000	Clay	(Italy) Andrea Gaudenzi	(Croatia) Ivan Ljubičić (Croatia) Lovro Zovko
21.06.	Italy	Biella Challenger	$ 25,000	Clay	(Chile) Nicolás Massú	(Italy) Filippo Messori (Italy) Massimo Valeri
21.06.	Germany	Wartburg Open	$ 25,000	Clay	(Spain) Juan Albert Viloca	(United States) Mitch Sprengelmeyer (South Africa) Jason Weir-Smith
21.06.	Czech Republic	Prague Challenger I	$ 25,000	Clay	(Czech Republic) Michal Tabara	(Czech Republic) Michal Tabara (Czech Republic) Radomír Vašek
28.06.	Italy	Venice Challenger	$ 100,000	Clay	(Romania) Andrei Pavel	(Spain) Albert Portas (Spain) Germán Puentes
28.06.	Germany	Müller Cup	$ 50,000	Clay	(Morocco) Younes El Aynaoui	(Australia) Andrew Painter (South Africa) Byron Talbot
28.06.	Switzerland	Lugano Challenger	$ 25,000	Clay	(Czech Republic) Michal Tabara	(Czech Republic) Michal Tabara (Czech Republic) Radomír Vašek
28.06.	France	Montauban Challenger	$ 25,000	Clay	(Spain) Álex López Morón	(Sweden) Simon Aspelin (Czech Republic) Ota Fukárek

=== July ===
Date	Country	Tournament	Prizemoney	Surface	Singles champion	Doubles champions
05.07.	Belgium	Ostend Challenger	$ 125,000	Clay	(France) Olivier Malcor	(South Africa) Marcos Ondruska (Australia) Steven Randjelovic
05.07.	Great Britain	Bristol Challenger	$ 50,000	Grass	(Netherlands) Raemon Sluiter	(Germany) Jan-Ralph Brandt (South Africa) Jeff Coetzee
05.07.	Canada	Granby Challenger	$ 50,000	Hard	(Czech Republic) Petr Kralert	(United States) Kevin Kim (Venezuela) Jimy Szymanski
05.07.	Germany	Oberstaufen Cup	$ 25,000	Clay	(Germany) Alexander Popp	(Netherlands) Edwin Kempes (Czech Republic) Petr Luxa
12.07.	Austria	Graz Challenger	$ 100,000	Clay	(Czech Republic) Tomáš Zíb	(Portugal) Nuno Marques (Belgium) Tom Vanhoudt
12.07.	United States	Aptos Challenger	$ 50,000	Hard	(Australia) Michael Hill	(Australia) Michael Hill (United States) Scott Humphries
12.07.	France	Contrexéville Challenger	$ 50,000	Clay	(Haiti) Ronald Agénor	(France) Jérôme Hanquez (France) Régis Lavergne
12.07.	Great Britain	Manchester Challenger	$ 50,000	Grass	(Italy) Igor Gaudi	(South Africa) Jeff Coetzee (South Africa) Neville Godwin
19.07.	Great Britain	Newcastle Challenger	$ 50,000	Clay	(United States) Jeff Tarango	(Netherlands) Marcus Hilpert (South Africa) Vaughan Snyman
19.07.	Italy	Olbia Challenger	$ 50,000	Hard	(Italy) Stefano Pescosolido	(Italy) Omar Camporese (Italy) Giorgio Galimberti
19.07.	Netherlands	Scheveningen Challenger	$ 50,000	Clay	(Spain) Emilio Benfele Álvarez	(Israel) Eyal Ran (Belgium) Tom Vanhoudt
19.07.	Finland	Tampere Challenger	$ 50,000	Clay	(Czech Republic) Radomír Vašek	(Czech Republic) Petr Dezort (Czech Republic) Radomír Vašek
19.07.	United States	Winnetka Challenger	$ 50,000	Hard	(United States) Alex O'Brien	(United States) James Blake (United States) Thomas Blake
19.07.	Spain	Córdoba Challenger	$ 37.500	Hard	(Uzbekistan) Oleg Ogorodov	(Japan) Satoshi Iwabuchi (Uzbekistan) Oleg Ogorodov
26.07.	Turkey	Istanbul Challenger	$ 100,000	Hard	(Uzbekistan) Vadim Kutsenko	(Japan) Gouichi Motomura (Uzbekistan) Oleg Ogorodov
26.07.	Great Britain	Edinburgh Challenger	$ 25,000	Clay	(Argentina) Héctor Moretti	(Netherlands) Marcus Hilpert (South Africa) Vaughan Snyman

=== August ===
Date	Country	Tournament	Prizemoney	Surface	Singles champion	Doubles champions
02.08.	Poland	Poznań Challenger	$ 100,000	Clay	(Spain) Galo Blanco	(Italy) Massimo Ardinghi (Italy) Davide Sanguinetti
02.08.	Spain	Open Castilla y León	$ 100,000	Hard	(France) Cyril Saulnier	(Switzerland) Roger Federer (Netherlands) Sander Groen
02.08.	United States	Lexington Challenger	$ 50,000	Hard	(Israel) Harel Levy	(United States) Michael Sell (Romania) Gabriel Trifu
02.08.	Brazil	Gramado Challenger	$ 25,000	Hard	(United Kingdom) Jamie Delgado	(Brazil) Antonio Prieto (Brazil) Alexandre Simoni
02.08.	Austria	Nettingsdorf Challenger	$ 25,000	Clay	(Hungary) Attila Sávolt	(Austria) Georg Blumauer (Austria) Alexander Peya
09.08.	United States	Binghamton Challenger	$ 50,000	Hard	(France) Antony Dupuis	(United States) Mitch Sprengelmeyer (South Africa) Jason Weir-Smith
09.08.	Brazil	Belo Horizonte Challenger	$ 25,000	Hard	(United Kingdom) Jamie Delgado	(Brazil) Daniel Melo (Brazil) Antonio Prieto
09.08.	Spain	Madrid Challenger	$ 25,000	Hard	(Czech Republic) Ota Fukárek	(Japan) Thomas Shimada (South Africa) Myles Wakefield
09.08.	Poland	Sopot Challenger	$ 25,000	Clay	(Spain) Roberto Carretero	(Poland) Bartłomiej Dąbrowski (Poland) Michał Gawłowski
09.08.	Austria	Vienna Challenger	$ 25,000	Clay	(Switzerland) Michel Kratochvil	(Austria) Julian Knowle (Austria) Thomas Strengberger
16.08.	Czech Republic	Prague Challenger II	$ 100,000	Clay	(Italy) Davide Sanguinetti	(Czech Republic) Petr Kovačka (Czech Republic) Pavel Kudrnáč
16.08.	United States	Bronx Challenger	$ 50,000	Hard	(Germany) Alexander Popp	(South Africa) Jeff Coetzee (Mexico) Alejandro Hernández
16.08.	Germany	Volvo Sylt Open	$ 50,000	Clay	(Switzerland) Michel Kratochvil	(Germany) Rene Nicklisch (Hungary) Attila Sávolt
16.08.	Italy	Bressanone Challenger	$ 25,000	Clay	(Italy) Gianluca Luddi	(Czech Republic) David Miketa (Czech Republic) Radovan Světlík
23.08.	Switzerland	Geneva Challenger	$ 50,000	Clay	(Switzerland) Michel Kratochvil	(Spain) Emilio Benfele Álvarez (Spain) Álex López Morón
23.08.	Italy	Manerbio Challenger	$ 25,000	Clay	(Hungary) Attila Sávolt	(Austria) Thomas Strengberger (Italy) Massimo Valeri
30.08.	Germany	Black Forest Open	$ 37.500	Clay	(Czech Republic) Michal Tabara	(Spain) Joan Balcells (Austria) Thomas Strengberger

=== September ===
Date	Country	Tournament	Prizemoney	Surface	Singles champion	Doubles champions
06.09.	Ukraine	Kyiv Challenger	$ 75,000	Clay	(Spain) Emilio Benfele Álvarez	(Sweden) Simon Aspelin (Sweden) Johan Landsberg
06.09.	Ecuador	Quito Challenger	$ 75,000	Clay	(Chile) Nicolás Massú	(Brazil) Paulo Taicher (Argentina) Andrés Zingman
06.09.	Germany	Rhein-Main Challenger	$ 25,000	Clay	(Germany) Rene Nicklisch	(Argentina) Francisco Cabello (Germany) Michael Kohlmann
06.09.	Bulgaria	Sofia Challenger I	$ 25,000	Clay	(Germany) Marcello Craca	(Germany) Karsten Braasch (Germany) Tomas Behrend
13.09.	Romania	Brașov Challenger	$ 50,000	Clay	(Spain) David Sánchez	(Romania) Andrei Pavel (Romania) Gabriel Trifu
13.09.	Hungary	Budapest Challenger	$ 25,000	Clay	(France) Stéphane Huet	(Israel) Harel Levy (Israel) Noam Okun
13.09.	North Macedonia	Skopje Challenger	$ 25,000	Clay	(Greece) Vasilis Mazarakis	(Hungary) Gergely Kisgyörgy (Australia) Steven Randjelovic
20.09.	Poland	Szczecin Challenger	$ 125,000	Clay	(Sweden) Andreas Vinciguerra	(North Macedonia) Aleksandar Kitinov (United States) Jack Waite
20.09.	United States	Austin Challenger	$ 37.500	Hard	(Brazil) André Sá	(South Africa) Marcos Ondruska (South Africa) Wesley Whitehouse
20.09.	Spain	Copa Sevilla	$ 25,000	Clay	(Argentina) Sebastián Prieto	(Argentina) Marcelo Charpentier (Puerto Rico) José Frontera
27.09.	United States	San Antonio Challenger	$ 37.500	Hard	(The Bahamas) Mark Knowles	(United States) Mitch Sprengelmeyer (South Africa) Jason Weir-Smith

=== October ===
Date	Country	Tournament	Prizemoney	Surface	Singles champion	Doubles champions
04.10.	Israel	Tel Aviv Challenger	$ 50,000	Hard	(Czech Republic) Ctislav Doseděl	(Israel) Noam Behr (Israel) Eyal Ran
04.10.	United States	Tulsa Challenger	$ 50,000	Hard	(Brazil) André Sá	(South Africa) Jeff Coetzee (Mexico) Alejandro Hernández
11.10.	Spain	Barcelona Challenger	$ 100,000	Clay	(Spain) Fernando Vicente	(Spain) Eduardo Nicolás (Spain) Germán Puentes
11.10.	Brazil	São Paulo Challenger	$ 100,000	Clay	(Argentina) Hernán Gumy	(Brazil) Jaime Oncins (Argentina) Daniel Orsanic
11.10.	United States	Dallas Challenger	$ 37.500	Hard	(Brazil) André Sá	(Australia) Paul Kilderry (Australia) Grant Silcock
18.10.	Egypt	Cairo Challenger	$ 125,000	Clay	(Morocco) Karim Alami	(Spain) Juan Ignacio Carrasco (Spain) Jairo Velasco Sr.
18.10.	Peru	Lima Challenger	$ 100,000	Clay	(Argentina) Juan Ignacio Chela	(Argentina) Pablo Albano (Argentina) Martín García
18.10.	Hong Kong	Hongkong Challenger	$ 50,000	Hard	(France) Stéphane Huet	(South Africa) Neville Godwin (Australia) Michael Hill
18.10.	United States	Houston Challenger	$ 37.500	Hard	(South Africa) Marcos Ondruska	(United States) David DiLucia (United States) Michael Sell
18.10.	Germany	Okal Cup	$ 25,000	Carpet (i)	(Switzerland) George Bastl	(Czech Republic) Petr Pála (Czech Republic) Pavel Vízner
25.10.	France	Brest Challenger	$ 100,000	Hard (i)	(Switzerland) Roger Federer	(Czech Republic) Martin Damm (Belarus) Max Mirnyi
25.10.	Uzbekistan	Samarkand Challenger	$ 25,000	Clay	(Uzbekistan) Oleg Ogorodov	(Israel) Noam Behr (Russia) Andrei Stoliarov

=== November ===
Date	Country	Tournament	Prizemoney	Surface	Singles champion	Doubles champions
01.11.	Chile	Santiago Challenger	$ 100,000	Clay	(Chile) Nicolás Massú	(Brazil) Antonio Prieto (Brazil) Cristiano Testa
01.11.	Germany	Lambertz Open by STAWAG	$ 50,000	Carpet (i)	(Netherlands) Raemon Sluiter	(Germany) Lars Burgsmüller (Japan) Takao Suzuki
01.11.	Japan	Yokohama Challenger	$ 25,000	Hard (i)	(South Korea) Lee Hyung-taik	(Japan) Satoshi Iwabuchi (Japan) Thomas Shimada
08.11.	Uruguay	Montevideo Challenger	$ 100,000	Clay	(Morocco) Karim Alami	(Argentina) Pablo Albano (Argentina) Martín García
08.11.	United States	Miami Challenger	$ 50,000	Hard	(South Africa) Marcos Ondruska	(Canada) Jocelyn Robichaud (South Africa) Myles Wakefield
15.11.	Argentina	Buenos Aires Challenger	$ 100,000	Clay	(Argentina) Franco Squillari	(Argentina) Guillermo Cañas (Argentina) Martín García
15.11.	Andorra	Andorra Challenger	$ 75,000	Hard (i)	(United States) Justin Gimelstob	(Spain) Juan Ignacio Carrasco (Spain) Jairo Velasco Jr.
15.11.	Mexico	Puebla Challenger	$ 25,000	Hard	(United States) Michael Sell	(Mexico) Óscar Ortiz (Mexico) Marco Osorio
15.11.	United States	Rancho Mirage Challenger	$ 25,000	Hard	(United States) Bob Bryan	(Japan) Thomas Shimada (South Africa) Myles Wakefield
22.11.	Mexico	Guadalajara Challenger	$ 100,000	Clay	(Brazil) Francisco Costa	(Japan) Thomas Shimada (South Africa) Myles Wakefield
29.11.	Venezuela	Caracas Challenger	$ 100,000	Hard	(Morocco) Younes El Aynaoui	(Argentina) Gastón Etlis (Argentina) Martín Rodríguez
29.11.	Germany	Nümbrecht Challenger	$ 50,000	Carpet (i)	(Switzerland) George Bastl	(Germany) Dirk Dier (Germany) Jens Knippschild
29.11.	United States	Urbana Challenger	$ 50,000	Hard	(Canada) Frédéric Niemeyer	(United States) Paul Goldstein (United States) Jim Thomas
29.11.	India	Lucknow Challenger II	$ 25,000	Grass	(India) Leander Paes	(Denmark) Kristian Pless (Thailand) Paradorn Srichaphan

=== December ===
Date	Country	Tournament	Prizemoney	Surface	Singles champion	Doubles champions
06.12.	United States	Burbank Challenger	$ 37.500	Hard	(United States) Cecil Mamiit	(United States) Bob Bryan (United States) Mike Bryan
06.12.	India	Jaipur Challenger	$ 25,000	Grass	(India) Leander Paes	(Czech Republic) Tomáš Anzari (Japan) Satoshi Iwabuchi
06.12.	Mexico	Mexico City Challenger	$ 25,000	Clay	(Argentina) Federico Browne	(Argentina) Gastón Etlis (Argentina) Damián Furmanski
06.12.	Australia	Perth Challenger	$ 25,000	Hard	(Australia) Paul Kilderry	(Australia) Paul Kilderry (Australia) Grant Silcock
