= 2000 Brighton International – Singles =

Singles
- 2000 Brighton International

Final
- Champion: (United Kingdom) Tim Henman
- Runner-up: (Slovakia) Dominik Hrbatý
- Score: 6–2, 6–2

Events
Singles	Doubles
- Brighton International

Adrian Voinea was the defending champion, but did not participate.

Tim Henman won the title, defeating Dominik Hrbatý 6–2, 6–2 in the final.

Goran Ivanišević retired in his second round match against Lee Hyung-taik, after he angrily smashed all of his rackets.

== Seeds ==
A champion seed is indicated in bold text while text in italics indicates the round in which that seed was eliminated.

1. (United Kingdom) **Tim Henman (champion)**
2. (Slovakia) Dominik Hrbatý (final)
3. (France) Fabrice Santoro (first round)
4. (Italy) Gianluca Pozzi (first round)
5. (Belarus) Vladimir Voltchkov (semifinals)
6. (United Kingdom) Greg Rusedski (first round)
7. (Italy) Davide Sanguinetti (quarterfinals)
8. (Germany) Markus Hantschk (first round)

== Draw ==
Key

- Q = Qualifier
- WC = Wild card
- LL = Lucky loser
- Alt = Alternate
- ITF = ITF entry
- PR = Protected ranking
- SR = Special ranking
- SE = Special exempt
- JE = Junior exempt
- JR = Junior Accelerator Programme entrant
- CO = College Accelerator Programme entrant
- NG = Next Gen Accelerator Program entrant
- w/o = Walkover
- r = Retired
- d = Defaulted

=== Finals ===
Semifinals
1	**(United Kingdom) Tim Henman**	**6**	**6**
(South Korea) Lee Hyung-taik	2	1
5	(Belarus) Vladimir Voltchkov	1	0
2	**(Slovakia) Dominik Hrbatý**	**6**	**6**

Final
1	**(United Kingdom) Tim Henman**	**6**	**6**
2	(Slovakia) Dominik Hrbatý	2	2

=== Top half ===
First round
1	**(United Kingdom) T Henman**	**6**	**6**
(Czech Republic) M Tabara	0	2
**(Netherlands) R Sluiter**	**6**	**6**
Q	(France) J-R Lisnard	1	1
Q	**(Germany) M-K Goellner**	**6**	**7^{7}**
(Australia) W Arthurs	0	6^{4}
**(United States) C Woodruff**	**6**	**6**
8	(Germany) M Hantschk	4	3
4	(Italy) G Pozzi	**6**	5	5
**(Croatia) G Ivanišević**	3	**7**	**7**
LL	(Australia) J Sekulov	1	2
**(South Korea) H-t Lee**	**6**	**6**
Q	**(Italy) R Furlan**	5	**6**	**7^{7}**
(Belgium) C Rochus	**7**	3	6^{5}
**(United States) P Goldstein**	**7^{7}**	**6**
6	(United Kingdom) G Rusedski	6^{4}	3

Second round
1	**(United Kingdom) T Henman**	**7^{10}**	**6**
(Netherlands) R Sluiter	6^{8}	1
Q	(Germany) M-K Goellner	4	**6**	2
**(United States) C Woodruff**	**6**	3	**6**
(Croatia) G Ivanišević	5	**7^{7}**	1^{r}
**(South Korea) H-t Lee**	**7**	6^{5}	3
Q	**(Italy) R Furlan**	**7**	**6**
(United States) P Goldstein	5	4

Quarterfinals
1	**(United Kingdom) T Henman**	w/o
(United States) C Woodruff
**(South Korea) H-t Lee**	**6**	**6**
Q	(Italy) R Furlan	1	3

Semifinals
1	**(United Kingdom) T Henman**	**6**	**6**
(South Korea) H-t Lee	2	1

=== Bottom half ===
First round
5	**(Belarus) V Voltchkov**	6^{1}	**6**	**6**
WC	(United Kingdom) L Milligan	**7^{7}**	3	1
Q	(United Kingdom) O Freelove	**7**	3	4
**(Italy) D Nargiso**	5	**6**	**6**
WC	**(United Kingdom) L Childs**	**6**	**7^{7}**
(Armenia) S Sargsian	3	6^{0}
**(Croatia) I Ljubičić**	**7^{7}**	**6**
3	(France) F Santoro	6^{5}	2
7	**(Italy) D Sanguinetti**	**7**	5	**6**
(United Kingdom) J Delgado	5	**7**	1
**(United Kingdom) B Cowan**	**7^{7}**	**6**
WC	(United Kingdom) M Lee	6^{1}	4
(United States) J Tarango	6^{5}	4
**(Germany) A Popp**	**7^{7}**	**6**
(United States) V Spadea	1	2
2	**(Slovakia) D Hrbatý**	**6**	**6**

Second round
5	**(Belarus) V Voltchkov**	w/o
(Italy) D Nargiso
WC	(United Kingdom) L Childs	2	4
**(Croatia) I Ljubičić**	**6**	**6**
7	**(Italy) D Sanguinetti**	**6**	**6**
(United Kingdom) B Cowan	4	3
(Germany) A Popp	**6**	1	0
2	**(Slovakia) D Hrbatý**	4	**6**	**6**

Quarterfinals
5	**(Belarus) V Voltchkov**	**7^{7}**	4	**6**
(Croatia) I Ljubičić	6^{1}	**6**	3
7	(Italy) D Sanguinetti	2	1
2	**(Slovakia) D Hrbatý**	**6**	**6**

Semifinals
5	(Belarus) V Voltchkov	1	0
2	**(Slovakia) D Hrbatý**	**6**	**6**
