= 2000 Hall of Fame Tennis Championships – Singles =

Singles
- 2000 Hall of Fame Tennis Championships

Final
- Champion: (Netherlands) Peter Wessels
- Runner-up: (Germany) Jens Knippschild
- Score: 7–6^{(7–3)}, 6–3

Events
Singles	Doubles
- Hall of Fame Tennis Championships

Chris Woodruff was the defending champion, but lost in second round to Mardy Fish.

Peter Wessels won the title by defeating Jens Knippschild 7–6^{(7–3)}, 6–3 in the final.

== Seeds ==
1. (United States) Chris Woodruff (second round)
2. (Italy) Gianluca Pozzi (second round)
3. (United States) Paul Goldstein (quarterfinals)
4. (Sweden) Jonas Björkman (quarterfinals)
5. (Australia) Jason Stoltenberg (semifinals)
6. (Germany) David Prinosil (second round)
7. (Australia) Wayne Arthurs (semifinals)
8. (Italy) Laurence Tieleman (second round)

== Draw ==
Key

- Q = Qualifier
- WC = Wild card
- LL = Lucky loser
- Alt = Alternate
- ITF = ITF entry
- PR = Protected ranking
- SR = Special ranking
- SE = Special exempt
- JE = Junior exempt
- JR = Junior Accelerator Programme entrant
- CO = College Accelerator Programme entrant
- NG = Next Gen Accelerator Program entrant
- w/o = Walkover
- r = Retired
- d = Defaulted

=== Final ===
Semifinals
7	(Australia) Wayne Arthurs	6^{6}	7^{9}	4
(Netherlands) Peter Wessels	7^{8}	6^{7}	6
5	(Australia) Jason Stoltenberg	3	4
(Germany) Jens Knippschild	6	6

Final
(Netherlands) Peter Wessels	7^{7}	6
(Germany) Jens Knippschild	6^{3}	3

=== Top half ===
First round
1	(United States) C Woodruff	6	6
(United States) M Russell	1	2
Q	(United States) M Fish	6^{2}	6	6
(Italy) C Caratti	7^{7}	3	2
WC	(United States) B Bryan	7	6
Q	(United States) J Thomas	5	2
(Australia) J Sekulov	2	2
7	(Australia) W Arthurs	6	6
4/WC	(Sweden) J Björkman	4	6	6
(Germany) A Pretzsch	6	3	2
(Germany) C Vinck	6	6
WC	(United States) J Morrison	1	2
(Canada) D Nestor	7^{7}	5^{r}
(Netherlands) P Wessels	6^{2}	7
(Israel) H Levy	6^{5}	6	3
6	(Germany) D Prinosil	7^{7}	3	6

Second round
1	(United States) C Woodruff	4	6	4
Q	(United States) M Fish	6	0	6
WC	(United States) B Bryan	3	4
7	(Australia) W Arthurs	6	6
4/WC	(Sweden) J Björkman	7^{8}	6
(Germany) C Vinck	6^{6}	0
(Netherlands) P Wessels	6	7
6	(Germany) D Prinosil	4	5

Quarterfinals
Q	(United States) M Fish	3	2
7	(Australia) W Arthurs	6	6
4/WC	(Sweden) J Björkman	6^{5}	3
(Netherlands) P Wessels	7^{7}	6

Semifinals
7	(Australia) W Arthurs	6^{6}	7^{9}	4
(Netherlands) P Wessels	7^{8}	6^{7}	6

=== Bottom half ===
First round
5	(Australia) J Stoltenberg	4	6	7^{8}
Q	(South Africa) N Godwin	6	3	6^{6}
(Russia) A Stoliarov	3	3
(Australia) D Petrović	6	6
(United States) J Gimelstob	6^{4}	6	3
(Finland) T Ketola	7^{7}	2	6
(Japan) G Motomura	4	3
3	(United States) P Goldstein	6	6
8	(Italy) L Tieleman	6	6
(Switzerland) L Manta	4	3
(Germany) J Knippschild	6	6^{5}	6
(South Africa) M Ondruska	3	7^{7}	2
(Spain) Ó Burrieza	6	3	5
Q	(Australia) S Draper	4	6	7
(France) A Dupuis	6^{4}	4
2	(Italy) G Pozzi	7^{7}	6

Second round
5	(Australia) J Stoltenberg	6	6
(Australia) D Petrović	3	2
(Finland) T Ketola	3	1
3	(United States) P Goldstein	6	6
8	(Italy) L Tieleman	6^{4}	3
(Germany) J Knippschild	7^{7}	6
Q	(Australia) S Draper	6	6
2	(Italy) G Pozzi	4	4

Quarterfinals
5	(Australia) J Stoltenberg	7^{7}	7^{7}
3	(United States) P Goldstein	6^{5}	6^{3}
(Germany) J Knippschild	6	6
Q	(Australia) S Draper	4	3

Semifinals
5	(Australia) J Stoltenberg	3	4
(Germany) J Knippschild	6	6
