= 1999 Bournemouth International – Singles =

Singles
- 1999 Bournemouth International

Final
- Champion: (Romania) Adrian Voinea
- Runner-up: (Austria) Stefan Koubek
- Score: 1–6, 7–5 7–6(2)

Events
Singles	Doubles
← 1998 ·	Bournemouth International	· 2000 →

Félix Mantilla was the defending champion but he lost in the first round to Kenneth Carlson.

Adrian Voinea won in the final against Stefan Koubek 1–6, 7–5, 7–6(2).

== Seeds ==
1. (Sweden) Thomas Enqvist (Semi finalist, retired back injury)
2. (Spain) Félix Mantilla (1st round)
3. (Morocco) Younes El Aynaoui (semi-finalist)
4. (Ukraine) Andrei Medvedev (round 1)
5. (Austria) Stefan Koubek (Runner up)
6. (France) Arnaud Di Pasquale (round 2)
7. (Norway) Christian Ruud (round 1)
8. (Morocco) Karim Alami (quarterfinals)

== Draw ==
=== Key ===
- Q = Qualifier
- WC = Wild card
- LL = Lucky loser
- Alt = Alternate
- SE = Special exempt
- PR = Protected ranking
- ITF = ITF entry
- JE = Junior exempt
- w/o = Walkover
- r = Retired
- d = Defaulted
- SR = Special ranking

=== Finals ===
Semifinals
(Romania) A Voinea	6	6
3	(Morocco) Y El Aynaoui	3	4
1	(Sweden) T Enqvist	3	6	5^{r}
5	(Austria) S Koubek	6	2	5

Final
(Romania) A Voinea	1	7	7
5	(Austria) S Koubek	6	5	6^{2}

=== Top half ===
First round
1	(Sweden) T Enqvist	7	6
(Sweden) N Kulti	5	1
(Spain) Á López Morón	6	6^{5}	6
(Argentina) G Etlis	1	7	3
(Spain) J Díaz	6	6
WC	(United Kingdom) J Delgado	2	1
8	(Morocco) K Alami	7	6
(Italy) D Sanguinetti	6^{6}	2
(Sweden) M Gustafsson	7	6
4	(Ukraine) A Medvedev	2	6^{5}
Q	(Argentina) M Hood	6	6
Q	(Italy) D Scala	3	2
5	(Austria) S Koubek	6	7
WC	(South Korea) H Lee	4	6^{4}
(Haiti) R Agénor	7	6
Q	(Italy) D Nargiso	6^{5}	1

Second round
1	(Sweden) T Enqvist	6	7
(Spain) Á López Morón	4	5
(Spain) J Díaz	1	6^{9}
8	(Morocco) K Alami	6	7
(Sweden) M Gustafsson	6	6
Q	(Argentina) M Hood	2	1
5	(Austria) S Koubek	6	6
(Haiti) R Agénor	4	1

Quarterfinals
1	(Sweden) T Enqvist	6	7
8	(Morocco) K Alami	3	5
(Sweden) M Gustafsson	3	2
5	(Austria) S Koubek	6	6

Semifinals
1	(Sweden) T Enqvist	3	6	5^{r}
5	(Austria) S Koubek	6	2	5

=== Bottom half ===
First round
6	(France) A Di Pasquale	6	6
WC	(United Kingdom) M Maclagan	3	4
(Germany) H Dreekmann	4	4
WC	(Germany) M Kohlmann	6	6
Q	(Italy) V Santopadre	0	0
Q	(United States) J Tarango	6	6
3	(Morocco) Y El Aynaoui	3	7	6
(Italy) A Gaudenzi	6	6^{5}	4
7	(Norway) C Ruud	1	1
(Germany) T Behrend	6	6
Q	(Germany) M Goellner	6	6
(Australia) R Fromberg	2	1
(Romania) A Voinea	1	6	6
(Germany) M Hantschk	6	4	2
(Denmark) K Carlsen	5	2
2	(Spain) F Mantilla	7	6

Second round
6	(France) A Di Pasquale	4	6	4
(Germany) H Dreekmann	6	2	6
Q	(Italy) V Santopadre	5	7	6
3	(Morocco) Y El Aynaoui	7	5	2
(Germany) T Behrend	6	3	3
Q	(Germany) M Goellner	4	6	6
(Romania) A Voinea	7	5	6
(Denmark) K Carlsen	5	7	1

Quarterfinals
(Germany) H Dreekmann
3	(Morocco) Y El Aynaoui	w/o
Q	(Germany) M Goellner	1	4
(Romania) A Voinea	6	6

Semifinals
3	(Morocco) Y El Aynaoui	6^{7}	4
(Romania) A Voinea	7	6
