= 2000 Hall of Fame Tennis Championships – Doubles =

Doubles
- 2000 Hall of Fame Tennis Championships

Final
- Champions: (Israel) Jonathan Erlich (Israel) Harel Levy
- Runners-up: (United Kingdom) Kyle Spencer (United States) Mitch Sprengelmeyer
- Score: 7–6^{(7–2)}, 7–5

Events
Singles	Doubles
- Hall of Fame Tennis Championships

Wayne Arthurs and Leander Paes were the defending champions, but none competed this year. Arthurs decided to focus on the singles tournament.

Jonathan Erlich and Harel Levy won the title by defeating Kyle Spencer and Mitch Sprengelmeyer 7–6^{(7–2)}, 7–5 in the final.

== Seeds ==
1. (United States) Bob Bryan / (United States) Mike Bryan (semifinals)
2. (South Africa) Neville Godwin / (South Africa) Marcos Ondruska (quarterfinals)
3. (United States) Paul Goldstein / (United States) Jim Thomas (first round)
4. (Australia) Andrew Painter / (Canada) Jocelyn Robichaud (first round)

== Draw ==
Key

- Q = Qualifier
- WC = Wild card
- LL = Lucky loser
- Alt = Alternate
- ITF = ITF entry
- PR = Protected ranking
- SR = Special ranking
- SE = Special exempt
- JE = Junior exempt
- JR = Junior Accelerator Programme entrant
- CO = College Accelerator Programme entrant
- NG = Next Gen Accelerator Program entrant
- w/o = Walkover
- r = Retired
- d = Defaulted

=== Draw ===
First round
1	(United States) B Bryan (United States) M Bryan	6	6
WC	(United States) Jonathan Beardsley (United States) Michael Passarella	2	0
Q	(Finland) V Liukko (Netherlands) P Wessels	6	7^{10}
(United States) M Keil (United States) M Russell	4	6^{8}
4	(Australia) A Painter (Canada) J Robichaud	4	4
(Israel) J Erlich (Israel) H Levy	6	6
(Finland) T Ketola (South Africa) G Williams	1	4
(The Bahamas) M Merklein (United States) C Woodruff	6	6
WC	(United States) J Morrison (United States) D Root	3	6	2
(Switzerland) L Manta (Italy) L Tieleman	6	3	6
(United States) S Humphries (United States) B Hawk	6	5	6
3	(United States) P Goldstein (United States) J Thomas	2	7	3
WC	(Australia) S Draper (Australia) J Stoltenberg	6^{5}	6	6^{6}
(United States) M Sprengelmeyer (United Kingdom) K Spencer	7^{7}	3	7^{8}
(Germany) J Knippschild (Russia) A Stoliarov	4	5
2	(South Africa) N Godwin (South Africa) M Ondruska	6	7

Quarterfinals
1	(United States) B Bryan (United States) M Bryan	7^{7}	6
Q	(Finland) V Liukko (Netherlands) P Wessels	6^{4}	2
(Israel) J Erlich (Israel) H Levy	3	6	6
(The Bahamas) M Merklein (United States) C Woodruff	6	2	3
(Switzerland) L Manta (Italy) L Tieleman	6	7^{7}
(United States) S Humphries (United States) B Hawk	4	6^{3}
(United States) M Sprengelmeyer (United Kingdom) K Spencer	6	7^{8}
2	(South Africa) N Godwin (South Africa) M Ondruska	3	6^{6}

Semifinals
1	(United States) B Bryan (United States) M Bryan	4	6	3
(Israel) J Erlich (Israel) H Levy	6	3	6
(Switzerland) L Manta (Italy) L Tieleman	4	4
(United States) M Sprengelmeyer (United Kingdom) K Spencer	6	6

Final
(Israel) J Erlich (Israel) H Levy	7^{7}	7
(United States) M Sprengelmeyer (United Kingdom) K Spencer	6^{2}	5
