= 1998 Bournemouth International – Doubles =

Doubles
- 1998 Bournemouth International

Final
- Champions: (United Kingdom) Neil Broad (Zimbabwe) Kevin Ullyett
- Runners-up: (Australia) Wayne Arthurs (Spain) Alberto Berasategui
- Score: 7–6, 6–3

Events
| Singles | men | women |
| Doubles | men | women |
| ← 1997 · | Bournemouth International | · 1999 → |

The 1998 Bournemouth International was a men's tennis tournament played on Clay in Bournemouth, Great Britain that was part of the International Series of the 1998 ATP Tour. It was the third edition of the tournament and was held from 14 September – 20 September.

== Seeds ==
Champion seeds are indicated in bold text while text in italics indicates the round in which those seeds were eliminated.

1. (South Africa) David Adams / (Australia) David Macpherson (semifinals)
2. (United Kingdom) **Neil Broad** / (South Africa) **Kevin Ullyett (champions)**
3. (South Africa) Chris Haggard / (United States) Jack Waite (quarterfinals)
4. (Australia) Wayne Arthurs / (Spain) Alberto Berasategui (final)

== Draw ==
=== Key ===
- Q = Qualifier
- WC = Wild card
- LL = Lucky loser
- Alt = Alternate
- ITF = ITF entry
- PR = Protected ranking
- SR = Special ranking
- SE = Special exempt
- JE = Junior exempt
- JR = Junior Accelerator Programme entrant
- CO = College Accelerator Programme entrant
- NG = Next Gen Accelerator Program entrant
- w/o = Walkover
- r = Retired
- d = Defaulted

=== Finals ===
First round
1 | (South Africa) **D Adams** **(Australia) D Macpherson** | **6** | **6**
(South Africa) M Ondruska (United Kingdom) C Wilkinson | 2 | 2
(United Kingdom) **M Maclagan** **(United Kingdom) D Sapsford** | **7** | **7**
(Australia) P Kilderry (Netherlands) S Noteboom | 6 | 5
4 | (Australia) **W Arthurs** **(Spain) A Berasategui** | **6** | **6**
(Italy) C Brandi (Italy) V Santopadre | 2 | 3
(South Africa) **M Barnard** **(Russia) A Olhovskiy** | 3 | **6** | **6**
(United Kingdom) B Cowan (United Kingdom) T Spinks | **6** | 4 | 3
(Germany) **M Kohlmann** **(Sweden) L-A Wahlgren** | **6** | **6**
(Argentina) D del Río (Netherlands) S Groen | 3 | 3
3 | (South Africa) **C Haggard** **(United States) J Waite** | 3 | **6** | **7**
(Spain) J Burillo (Germany) M-K Goellner | **6** | 4 | 5
(United States) **D Bowen** **(United States) E Taino** | **6** | 2 | **7**
(Spain) J Balcells (Spain) T Carbonell | 0 | **6** | 6
2 | (United Kingdom) **N Broad** **(South Africa) K Ullyett** | 6 | **7** | **7**
(Argentina) F Browne (Argentina) M Rodríguez | **7** | 5 | 5

Quarterfinals
1 | (South Africa) **D Adams** **(Australia) D Macpherson** | **6** | **7**
(United Kingdom) M Maclagan (United Kingdom) D Sapsford | 4 | 6
4 | (Australia) **W Arthurs** **(Spain) A Berasategui** | 2 | **6** | **6**
(South Africa) M Barnard (Russia) A Olhovskiy | **6** | 3 | 3
(Germany) **M Kohlmann** **(Sweden) L-A Wahlgren** | 5 | **6** | **6**
3 | (South Africa) C Haggard (United States) J Waite | **7** | 2 | 3
(United States) D Bowen (United States) E Taino | **6** | 6 | 2
2 | (United Kingdom) **N Broad** **(South Africa) K Ullyett** | 3 | **7** | **6**

Semifinals
1 | (South Africa) D Adams (Australia) D Macpherson | 6 | 3
4 | (Australia) **W Arthurs** **(Spain) A Berasategui** | **7** | **6**
(Germany) M Kohlmann (Sweden) L-A Wahlgren | **6** | 4 | 5
2 | (United Kingdom) **N Broad** **(South Africa) K Ullyett** | 4 | **6** | **7**

Final
4 | (Australia) W Arthurs (Spain) A Berasategui | 6 | 3
2 | (United Kingdom) **N Broad** **(South Africa) K Ullyett** | **7** | **6**
