= 1992 ATP Challenger Series =

Tennis tour

Details
- Duration: 20 January 1992 – 20 December 1992
- Edition: 15th
- Tournaments: 89

Achievements (singles)

The ATP Challenger Series is the second-tier tour for professional tennis organised by the Association of Tennis Professionals (ATP). The 1992 ATP Challenger Series calendar comprised 89 tournaments, with prize money ranging from $25,000 up to $100,000.

== Schedule ==
=== January ===
Date	Country	Tournament	Prizemoney	Surface	Singles champion	Doubles champions
20.01.	Germany	Heilbronn Open	$ 75,000	Carpet (i)	(Germany) Karsten Braasch	(United States) Doug Eisenman (Norway) Bent-Ove Pedersen
27.01.	India	Bangalore Challenger	$ 25,000	Clay	(Italy) Mario Visconti	(United Kingdom) Nick Brown (United Kingdom) Andrew Foster

=== February ===
Date	Country	Tournament	Prizemoney	Surface	Singles champion	Doubles champions
03.02.	Indonesia	Jakarta Challenger	$100,000	Clay	(Italy) Claudio Pistolesi	(Netherlands) Mark Koevermans (Mexico) Leonardo Lavalle
24.02.	France	Rennes Challenger	$100,000	Hard (i)	(Germany) Karsten Braasch	(United States) Francisco Montana (United States) Kenny Thorne
24.02.	United States	Indian Wells Challenger	$ 50,000	Hard	(Australia) Richard Fromberg	(South Africa) Pieter Aldrich (South Africa) Danie Visser

=== March ===
Date	Country	Tournament	Prizemoney	Surface	Singles champion	Doubles champions
02.03.	Spain	Zaragoza Challenger	$100,000	Hard (i)	(Brazil) Luiz Mattar	(South Africa) David Adams (Russia) Andrei Olhovskiy
09.03.	Tunisia	Tunis Challenger	$ 75,000	Clay	(Uruguay) Marcelo Filippini	(South Africa) David Adams (Czechoslovakia) Martin Damm
09.03.	Chile	Santiago de Chile Challenger	$ 25,000	Clay	(Argentina) Marcelo Ingaramo	(Sweden) Christer Allgårdh (Netherlands) Jacco Van Duyn
23.03.	Morocco	Agadir Challenger	$ 75,000	Clay	(Argentina) Guillermo Pérez Roldán	(United States) Mike Briggs (United States) Trevor Kronemann
30.03.	Italy	Parioli Challenger	$ 75,000	Clay	(Argentina) Franco Davín	(United States) Shelby Cannon (United States) Greg Van Emburgh

=== April ===
Date	Country	Tournament	Prizemoney	Surface	Singles champion	Doubles champions
06.04.	Israel	Jerusalem Challenger	$ 50,000	Clay	(Israel) Gilad Bloom	(New Zealand) Steve Guy (Australia) Carl Limberger
13.04.	Mexico	San Luis Potosí Challenger	$100,000	Clay	(Mexico) Leonardo Lavalle	(Mexico) Luis Herrera (Mexico) Leonardo Lavalle
20.04.	Portugal	Oporto Challenger I	$100,000	Clay	(Spain) José Francisco Altur	(Australia) Carl Limberger (Czechoslovakia) Tomáš Anzari
20.04.	United States	Birmingham Challenger	$ 50,000	Clay	(Sweden) Mikael Pernfors	(United States) Bret Garnett (Sweden) Tobias Svantesson
20.04.	Japan	Nagoya Challenger	$ 50,000	Hard	(United States) Chuck Adams	(United Kingdom) Jeremy Bates (United Kingdom) Mark Petchey
27.04.	Mexico	Acapulco Challenger	$100,000	Clay	(Mexico) Leonardo Lavalle	(South Africa) Royce Deppe (South Africa) Brent Haygarth
27.04.	Chinese Taipei	Taipeh Challenger	$100,000	Hard	(Australia) Sandon Stolle	(Australia) Broderick Dyke (Sweden) Peter Lundgren

=== May ===
Date	Country	Tournament	Prizemoney	Surface	Singles champion	Doubles champions
04.05.	Malaysia	Kuala Lumpur Challenger I	$ 50,000	Hard	(Australia) Sandon Stolle	(Australia) Jamie Morgan (Australia) Sandon Stolle
04.05.	Slovenia	Ljubljana Challenger	$ 50,000	Clay	(Sweden) Magnus Larsson	(Sweden) Magnus Larsson (Sweden) Mikael Tillström
04.05.	Brazil	São Paulo Challenger I	$ 50,000	Hard	(Mexico) Luis Herrera	(South Africa) Grant Stafford (Zimbabwe) Kevin Ullyett
04.05.	Czechoslovakia	Prague Challenger	$ 25,000	Clay	(Czechoslovakia) Karol Kučera	(Czechoslovakia) Martin Damm (Czechoslovakia) David Rikl
11.05.	Belgium	Antwerp Challenger	$ 25,000	Clay	(Germany) Marc-Kevin Goellner	(Australia) Michael Brown (Australia) Roger Rasheed
11.05.	Brazil	Itu Challenger	$ 25,000	Hard	(United States) Robbie Weiss	(South Africa) Grant Stafford (Zimbabwe) Kevin Ullyett

=== June ===
Date	Country	Tournament	Prizemoney	Surface	Singles champion	Doubles champions
01.06.	Italy	Turin Challenger	$100,000	Clay	(Argentina) Franco Davín	(Zimbabwe) Byron Black (South Africa) John-Laffnie de Jager
01.06.	Germany	Quelle Cup	$ 50,000	Clay	(Czechoslovakia) Martin Střelba	(Germany) Rüdiger Haas (Germany) Udo Riglewski
08.06.	France	Yvetot Challenger	$100,000	Clay	(Haiti) Ronald Agénor	(Sweden) Mårten Renström (Sweden) Mikael Tillström
08.06.	Germany	Cologne Challenger	$ 50,000	Clay	(Denmark) Kenneth Carlsen	(Germany) Marc-Kevin Goellner (Germany) Bernd Karbacher
15.06.	Germany	Gerry Weber Open	$ 50,000	Clay	(Germany) Marc-Kevin Goellner	(Germany) Karsten Braasch (Sweden) Lars Koslowski
22.06.	Austria	Salzburg Challenger	$100,000	Clay	(Spain) Jordi Arrese	(Sweden) Jan Apell (Sweden) Mikael Tillström
29.06.	Portugal	Oporto Challenger II	$100,000	Clay	(Spain) Jordi Arrese	(United States) Doug Eisenman (Norway) Bent-Ove Pedersen
29.06.	Italy	Salerno Challenger	$ 75,000	Clay	(Argentina) Gabriel Markus	(Australia) Andrew Kratzmann (Australia) Roger Rasheed
29.06.	Spain	Copa Sevilla	$ 25,000	Clay	(Colombia) Mauricio Hadad	(Sweden) Christer Allgårdh (Sweden) Tomas Nydahl

=== July ===
Date	Country	Tournament	Prizemoney	Surface	Singles champion	Doubles champions
06.07.	Great Britain	Bristol Challenger	$ 50,000	Grass	(Germany) Patrick Baur	(Australia) Dejan Petrović (Pakistan) Aisam-ul-Haq Qureshi
06.07.	Germany	Müller Cup	$ 50,000	Clay	(South Africa) Marcos Ondruska	(Argentina) Gustavo Luza (Argentina) Daniel Orsanic
06.07.	Brazil	Gramado Challenger	$ 25,000	Hard	(Italy) Nicola Bruno	(United States) Richard Matuszewski (United States) John Sullivan
13.07.	Finland	Tampere Challenger	$100,000	Hard	(Denmark) Kenneth Carlsen	(Sweden) Jonas Björkman (Sweden) Johan Donar
13.07.	Great Britain	Newcastle Challenger	$ 50,000	Grass	(United Kingdom) Greg Rusedski	(Argentina) Javier Frana (South Africa) Christo van Rensburg
13.07.	Brazil	Campos Challenger	$ 25,000	Hard	(United States) Richard Matuszewski	(Brazil) José Daher (United States) Mario Tabares
20.07.	United States	Aptos Challenger	$ 50,000	Hard	(United States) Alex O'Brien	(United States) Paul Annacone (United States) Alex O'Brien
20.07.	Brazil	Belo Horizonte Challenger	$ 25,000	Clay	(Austria) Gilbert Schaller	(Brazil) Nelson Aerts (Brazil) Alexandre Hocevar
20.07.	Germany	Oberstaufen Cup	$ 25,000	Clay	(Italy) Massimo Valeri	(Australia) Johan Anderson (Sweden) Lars-Anders Wahlgren
27.07.	Brazil	Lins Challenger	$ 50,000	Clay	(Austria) Gilbert Schaller	(Portugal) João Cunha e Silva (Venezuela) Nicolás Pereira
27.07.	Poland	Poznań Challenger	$ 50,000	Clay	(Czechoslovakia) Ctislav Doseděl	(Poland) Tomasz Iwański (Belgium) Dick Norman
27.07.	United States	Winnetka Challenger	$ 50,000	Hard	(United States) Chuck Adams	(Australia) Andrew Kratzmann (Australia) Roger Rasheed
27.07.	Austria	Vienna Challenger	$ 25,000	Clay	(Austria) Thomas Buchmayer	(Poland) Wojciech Kowalski (Sweden) Krister Wedenby

=== August ===
Date	Country	Tournament	Prizemoney	Surface	Singles champion	Doubles champions
03.08.	Italy	Pescara Challenger	$ 50,000	Clay	(Spain) Federico Sánchez	(Italy) Massimo Cierro (Sweden) Nicklas Utgren
03.08.	Belgium	Liège Challenger	$ 25,000	Clay	(Chile) Sergio Cortés	(Spain) Juan Carlos Báguena (Belgium) Eduardo Masso
03.08.	Brazil	Ribeirão Challenger	$ 25,000	Clay	(Chile) Gabriel Silberstein	(Sweden) Christer Allgårdh (Venezuela) Maurice Ruah
10.08.	United States	New Haven Challenger	$ 50,000	Hard	(United States) Jimmy Arias	(United States) Todd Nelson (India) Leander Paes
10.08.	Spain	Open Castilla y León	$100,000	Hard	(France) Guillaume Raoux	(Netherlands) Mike van den Berg (Netherlands) Joost Wijnhoud
10.08.	Brazil	Fortaleza Challenger	$ 25,000	Clay	(Venezuela) Maurice Ruah	(Australia) Andrew Kratzmann (Australia) Roger Rasheed
17.08.	Austria	Graz Challenger	$100,000	Clay	(Argentina) Guillermo Pérez Roldán	(Germany) David Prinosil (Czechoslovakia) Richard Vogel
17.08.	Turkey	Istanbul Challenger	$100,000	Hard	(Sweden) Henrik Holm	(France) Stéphane Simian (France) Bertrand Lemercier
17.08.	Switzerland	Geneva Challenger	$ 50,000	Clay	(Chile) Sergio Cortés	(Belgium) Filip Dewulf (Belgium) Tom Vanhoudt
17.08.	Brazil	São Paulo Challenger II	$ 50,000	Clay	(Argentina) Martin Stringari	(Argentina) Pablo Albano (Brazil) Cássio Motta
31.08.	Italy	Merano Challenger	$ 50,000	Clay	(Germany) Lars Koslowski	(Netherlands) Sander Groen (Germany) David Prinosil

=== September ===
Date	Country	Tournament	Prizemoney	Surface	Singles champion	Doubles champions
07.09.	Portugal	Azores Challenger	$100,000	Hard	(Sweden) Henrik Holm	(Sweden) Henrik Holm (Sweden) Nicklas Utgren
07.09.	Italy	Venice Challenger	$100,000	Clay	(Austria) Thomas Muster	(Federal Republic of Yugoslavia) Nebojša Đorđević (South Africa) Marcos Ondruska
07.09.	Brazil	Guarujá Challenger	$ 25,000	Hard	(Venezuela) Nicolás Pereira	(Venezuela) Maurice Ruah (United States) Mario Tabares
14.09.	Morocco	Casablanca Challenger	$ 50,000	Clay	(Austria) Gilbert Schaller	(Belgium) Filip Dewulf (Belgium) Tom Vanhoudt
21.09.	Romania	Bucharest Challenger	$100,000	Clay	(Argentina) Horacio de la Peña	(Argentina) Horacio de la Peña (South Africa) Marcos Ondruska
21.09.	Colombia	Bogotá Challenger	$ 50,000	Clay	(Spain) Daniel Marco	(Venezuela) Nicolás Pereira (United States) Mario Tabares
21.09.	United States	Fairfield Challenger	$ 50,000	Hard	(United States) Jared Palmer	(United States) Jared Palmer (United States) Jim Pugh
21.09.	Singapore	Singapore Challenger	$ 50,000	Hard	(France) Lionel Roux	(Barbados) Martin Blackman (Italy) Laurence Tieleman
28.09.	Mexico	Monterrey Challenger	$100,000	Hard	(United States) Alex O'Brien	(The Bahamas) Mark Knowles (United States) Alex O'Brien
28.09.	Colombia	Cali Challenger	$ 50,000	Hard	(Colombia) Mauricio Hadad	(Germany) Michael Geserer (Brazil) Fabio Silberberg

=== October ===
Date	Country	Tournament	Prizemoney	Surface	Singles champion	Doubles champions
05.10.	Ireland	Dublin Challenger	$ 50,000	Hard	(Czechoslovakia) Martin Damm	(Netherlands) Sander Groen (Germany) Arne Thoms
05.10.	Mexico	Ixtapa Challenger	$ 50,000	Hard	(Mexico) Luis Herrera	
05.10.	Italy	Reggio Calabria Challenger	$ 50,000	Clay	(Argentina) Roberto Azar	(South Africa) Brent Haygarth (Czechoslovakia) Tomáš Anzari
12.10.	United States	Ponte Vedra Beach Challenger	$100,000	Hard	(Mexico) Luis Herrera	(United States) Jared Palmer (United States) Jim Pugh
12.10.	Argentina	Buenos Aires Challenger	$ 50,000	Clay	(Spain) Juan Gisbert Jr.	(Argentina) Pablo Albano (Argentina) Javier Frana
12.10.	France	Cherbourg Challenger	$ 50,000	Hard (i)	(Sweden) Jan Apell	(United States) Kent Kinnear (Germany) Christian Saceanu
12.10.	Brazil	Recife Challenger	$ 50,000	Hard	(Brazil) Luiz Mattar	(Canada) Sébastien Lareau (Canada) Daniel Nestor
19.10.	Venezuela	Caracas Challenger	$ 75,000	Hard	(Czechoslovakia) Daniel Vacek	(United States) Doug Eisenman (United States) Tom Mercer
26.10.	France	Brest Challenger	$100,000	Hard (i)	(South Africa) Marcos Ondruska	(South Africa) Marius Barnard (South Africa) Brent Haygarth

=== November ===
Date	Country	Tournament	Prizemoney	Surface	Singles champion	Doubles champions
02.11.	Germany	Lambertz Open by STAWAG	$ 50,000	Carpet (i)	(Czechoslovakia) Martin Damm	(South Africa) Grant Stafford (South Africa) Christo van Rensburg
02.11.	Philippines	Manila Challenger	$ 25,000	Hard	(Australia) Richard Fromberg	(Australia) Richard Fromberg (New Zealand) Steve Guy
09.11.	Germany	Munich Challenger	$ 50,000	Carpet (i)	(Czechoslovakia) Daniel Vacek	(Netherlands) Sander Groen (Germany) Arne Thoms
09.11.	Brunei	Brunei Challenger	$ 25,000	Hard	(United States) Louis Gloria	(Republic of Ireland) Owen Casey (United States) Donald Johnson
09.11.	Canada	Halifax Challenger	$ 25,000	Hard	(Canada) Sébastien Lareau	(South Africa) Ellis Ferreira (United States) Richard Schmidt
16.11.	Mexico	Guadalajara Challenger	$100,000	Clay	(United States) David Witt	(South Africa) Royce Deppe (Czechoslovakia) David Rikl
16.11.	Brazil	São Luís Challenger	$ 50,000	Hard	(Brazil) Luiz Mattar	(Brazil) Luiz Mattar (Brazil) Jaime Oncins
16.11.	Malaysia	Kuala Lumpur Challenger II	$ 25,000	Hard	(United Kingdom) Chris Wilkinson	(United States) Mitch Michulka (United Kingdom) Mark Petchey
23.11.	United States	Pembroke Pines Challenger	$ 75,000	Clay	(Mexico) Leonardo Lavalle	(Sweden) Rikard Bergh (United States) Trevor Kronemann
23.11.	Australia	Launceston Challenger	$ 25,000	Hard	(Australia) Richard Fromberg	(Australia) Richard Fromberg (Australia) Pat Rafter
30.11.	United States	Naples Challenger	$ 50,000	Clay	(Spain) Juan Gisbert Jr.	(United States) Todd Nelson (Sweden) Tobias Svantesson
30.11.	Australia	Perth Challenger	$ 25,000	Hard	(United States) Kent Kinnear	(South Africa) Lan Bale (South Africa) David Nainkin

=== December ===
Date	Country	Tournament	Prizemoney	Surface	Singles champion	Doubles champions
07.12.	China	Guangzhou Challenger	$ 25,000	Hard	(South Korea) Roh Gap-taik	(United States) Kent Kinnear (Germany) Christian Saceanu
14.12.	Hong Kong	Hongkong Challenger	$ 25,000	Hard	(United States) Tommy Ho	(United States) Donald Johnson (India) Leander Paes
