= 1998 Bournemouth International =

- Date: 14–20 September
- Edition: 3rd
- Category: International Series
- Surface: Clay / outdoor
- Location: Bournemouth, England

Champions

Singles
- (Spain) Félix Mantilla

Doubles
- (United Kingdom) Neil Broad / (Zimbabwe) Kevin Ullyett
← 1997 ·	Bournemouth International	· 1999 →

The 1998 Bournemouth International was a men's tennis tournament played on Clay in Bournemouth, Great Britain that was part of the International Series of the 1998 ATP Tour. It was the third edition of the tournament and was held from 14 September until 20 September 1998. Félix Mantilla won the singles title.

== Finals ==
=== Singles ===
(Spain) Félix Mantilla defeated (Spain) Albert Costa, 6–3, 7–5

=== Doubles ===
(United Kingdom) Neil Broad / (Zimbabwe) Kevin Ullyett defeated (Australia) Wayne Arthurs / (Spain) Alberto Berasategui, 7–6, 6–3
