= 1998 Bournemouth International – Singles =

Singles
- 1998 Bournemouth International

Final
- Champion: (Spain) Félix Mantilla
- Runner-up: (Spain) Albert Costa
- Score: 6–3, 7–5

Events
Singles	men	women
Doubles	men	women
← 1997 ·	Bournemouth International	· 1999 →

The 1998 Bournemouth International was a men's tennis tournament played on Clay in Bournemouth, Great Britain that was part of the International Series of the 1998 ATP Tour. It was the third edition of the tournament and was held from 14 to 20 September 1998.

== Seeds ==
Champion seeds are indicated in bold text while text in italics indicates the round in which those seeds were eliminated.

1. (Spain) Alberto Berasategui (quarterfinals)
2. (Spain) Albert Costa (final)
3. (Spain) **Félix Mantilla (champion)**
4. (Sweden) Magnus Norman (first round)
5. (Spain) Fernando Vicente (first round)
6. (Argentina) Mariano Zabaleta (first round)
7. (United States) Steve Campbell (first round)
8. (France) Arnaud Clément (quarterfinals)

== Draw ==
=== Key ===
- Q = Qualifier
- WC = Wild card
- LL = Lucky loser
- Alt = Alternate
- SE = Special exempt
- PR = Protected ranking
- ITF = ITF entry
- JE = Junior exempt
- w/o = Walkover
- r = Retired
- d = Defaulted
- SR = Special ranking

=== Finals ===
Semifinals
(Germany) Marc-Kevin Goellner	4	2
3	**(Spain) Félix Mantilla**	**6**	**6**
(Italy) Vincenzo Santopadre	6	0
2	**(Spain) Albert Costa**	**7**	**6**

Final
3	**(Spain) Félix Mantilla**	**6**	**7**
2	(Spain) Albert Costa	3	5

=== Top half ===
First round
1	**(Spain) A Berasategui**	**6**	**7**
(United Kingdom) N Gould	4	6
**(Argentina) M Rodríguez**	**7**	**6**
(United Kingdom) B Cowan	5	2
**(Germany) M-K Goellner**	**6**	**6**
(Italy) M Meneschincheri	3	2
**(Sweden) T Nydahl**	**6**	**6**
7	(United States) S Campbell	3	3
3	**(Spain) F Mantilla**	**6**	**6**
(Argentina) F Browne	4	2
**(Spain) J Burillo**	**6**	4	**6**
(Spain) S Bruguera	4	**6**	2
**(Australia) T Larkham**	**6**	**6**
(United Kingdom) M Maclagan	1	1
**(Austria) S Koubek**	**6**	5	**7**
6	(Argentina) M Zabaleta	1	**7**	6

Second round
1	**(Spain) A Berasategui**	**6**	4	**6**
(Argentina) M Rodríguez	3	**6**	4
**(Germany) M-K Goellner**	**7**	**6**
(Sweden) T Nydahl	6	2
3	**(Spain) F Mantilla**	**7**	**6**
(Spain) J Burillo	5	2
(Australia) T Larkham	**6**	0	5
**(Austria) S Koubek**	4	**6**	**7**

Quarterfinals
1	(Spain) A Berasategui	4	3
**(Germany) M-K Goellner**	**6**	**6**
3	**(Spain) F Mantilla**	6	**6**	**6**
(Austria) S Koubek	**7**	4	4

Semifinals
(Germany) M-K Goellner	4	2
3	**(Spain) F Mantilla**	**6**	**6**

=== Bottom half ===
First round
**(Spain) Á López Morón**	**7**	**6**
5	(Spain) F Vicente	5	1
**(Spain) Ó Serrano**	**6**	**6**
(Switzerland) I Heuberger	1	3
**(Germany) M Kohlmann**	**6**	**6**
(France) C Auffray	4	1
**(Italy) V Santopadre**	2	**6**	**7**
4	(Sweden) M Norman	**6**	2	6
8	**(France) A Clément**	**6**	**6**
(South Africa) M Ondruska	2	3
**(Slovakia) J Krošlák**	**6**	**7**
(United Kingdom) C Wilkinson	4	5
**(Netherlands) D van Scheppingen**	**6**	**6**
(Bulgaria) O Stanoytchev	4	3
2	**(Spain) A Costa**	**6**	**6**
(Germany) M Craca	3	3

Second round
**(Spain) Á López Morón**	4	**6**	**6**
(Spain) Ó Serrano	**6**	4	2
(Germany) M Kohlmann	0	3
**(Italy) V Santopadre**	**6**	**6**
8	**(France) A Clément**	**7**	**7**
(Slovakia) J Krošlák	2	6
(Netherlands) D van Scheppingen	3	2
2	**(Spain) A Costa**	**6**	**6**

Quarterfinals
(Spain) Á López Morón	3	3
**(Italy) V Santopadre**	**6**	**6**
8	(France) A Clément	**6**	3	6
2	**(Spain) A Costa**	4	**6**	**7**

Semifinals
(Italy) V Santopadre	6	0
2	**(Spain) A Costa**	**7**	**6**
