= Lee Childs =

British tennis player

- Country (sports): United Kingdom
- Residence: Bridgwater, England, United Kingdom
- Born: 11 June 1982 (age 43) Yeovil, Somerset, England, United Kingdom
- Plays: Right-handed (one-handed backhand)
- Coach: Danny Sapsford
- Prize money: $201,900

Singles
- Career record: 3–8 (at ATP Tour and Grand Slam-level, and in Davis Cup)
- Career titles: 0
- Highest ranking: No. 251 (21 June 2004)

Grand Slam singles results
- Wimbledon: 2R (2003)

Doubles
- Career record: 0–8 (at ATP Tour and Grand Slam-level, and in Davis Cup)
- Career titles: 0
- Highest ranking: No. 344 (22 August 2005)

Grand Slam doubles results
- Wimbledon: 1R (1999, 2001, 2002, 2003, 2004, 2007)

Grand Slam mixed doubles results
- Wimbledon: 3R (2002)
- Last updated on: 24 December 2021.

Lee Childs (born 6 November 1982, in Yeovil) is a retired British tennis player from England.

Following match victories in 2000, Childs was hailed as "the future of British tennis" and a successor to Tim Henman and Greg Rusedski. At the 2003 Wimbledon Championships, he famously defeated Nikolay Davydenko in the first round in 5 sets. The score was 2–6, 7–6^{(2)}, 1–6, 7–6^{(5)}, 6–2. He then lost in the next round to a 17-year-old Rafael Nadal in straight sets, 6–2, 6–4, 6–3.

Growing up, Lee went to Pawlett Primary School. He got his passion for tennis from his head teacher, Chris Vincent.

== Junior Grand Slam finals ==
=== Doubles: 1 (1 title) ===
Result	Year	Tournament	Surface	Partner	Opponents	Score
Win	2000	US Open	Hard	(United Kingdom) James Nelson	(United States) Robby Ginepri (United States) Tres Davis	6–2, 6–4

== ATP Challenger and ITF Futures finals ==
=== Singles: 6 (2–4) ===
Legend ATP Challenger (0–1) ITF Futures (2–3)	Finals by surface Hard (2–4) Clay (0–0) Grass (0–0) Carpet (0–0)

Result	W–L	Date	Tournament	Tier	Surface	Opponent	Score
Loss	0–1	Oct 2000	Great Britain F9, Glasgow	Futures	Hard	(Switzerland) Jean-Claude Scherrer	3–5, 4–5^{(3–5)}, 2–4
Loss	0–2	Oct 2000	Great Britain F10, Edinburgh	Futures	Hard	(South Africa) Wesley Moodie	5–4^{(8–6)}, 3–5, 2–4, 5–4^{(7–5)}, 3–5
Win	1–2	Oct 2000	Great Britain F11, Leeds	Futures	Hard	(Germany) Bernard Parun	5–4^{(7–5)}, 5–3, 5–3
Loss	1–3	Oct 2003	Tumkur, India	Challenger	Hard	(Germany) Philipp Kohlschreiber	5–7, 6–7^{(5–7)}
Loss	1–4	Nov 2005	Canada F2, Rimouski	Futures	Hard	(Germany) Benjamin Becker	6–3, 3–6, 4–6
Win	2–4	May 2007	Greece F2, Syros	Futures	Hard	(United Kingdom) Miles Kasiri	2–0 ret.

=== Doubles: 12 (5–7) ===
Legend ATP Challenger (0–1) ITF Futures (5–6)	Finals by surface Hard (4–5) Clay (0–1) Grass (1–0) Carpet (0–1)

Result	W–L	Date	Tournament	Tier	Surface	Partner	Opponents	Score
Loss	0–1	Sep 1999	Great Britain F8, Sunderland	Futures	Hard	(United Kingdom) Simon Dickson	(United Kingdom) Oliver Freelove (United States) Jeff Laski	2–6, 4–6
Win	1–1	Oct 2000	Great Britain F11, Leeds	Futures	Hard	(United Kingdom) James Nelson	(United Kingdom) James Auckland (United Kingdom) Barry Fulcher	5–4^{(6–4)}, 5–3, 2–4, 4–2
Loss	1–2	Feb 2001	Great Britain F1, Nottingham	Futures	Carpet	(United Kingdom) James Nelson	(United Kingdom) Oliver Freelove (United Kingdom) James Davidson	4–6, 7–6^{(7–4)}, 6–7^{(1–7)}
Loss	1–3	Nov 2001	Bolton, United Kingdom	Challenger	Hard	(United Kingdom) Mark Hilton	(Belgium) Gilles Elseneer (Belgium) Wim Neefs	4–6, 3–6
Loss	1–4	May 2002	Great Britain F3, Bournemouth	Futures	Clay	(United Kingdom) Mark Hilton	(Czech Republic) Jaroslav Levinsky (Czech Republic) Michal Navratil	0–6, 2–6
Loss	1–5	Apr 2005	Great Britain F6, Bath	Futures	Hard	(Germany) Alexander Flock	(United Kingdom) Ross Hutchins (United Kingdom) Martin Lee	6–7^{(4–7)}, 3–6
Loss	1–6	Sep 2005	Great Britain F11, Nottingham	Futures	Hard	(United Kingdom) Martin Lee	(France) Olivier Charroin (Norway) Frederick Sundsten	3–6, 6–3, 3–6
Loss	1–7	Nov 2005	Canada F2, Rimouski	Futures	Hard	(Norway) Frederick Sundsten	(United Kingdom) Ross Hutchins (United Kingdom) Jamie Murray	6–7^{(5–7)}, 6–7^{(6–8)}
Win	2–7	Jul 2006	Great Britain F9, Felixstowe	Futures	Grass	(Australia) Luke Bourgeois	(United Kingdom) Ross Hutchins (United Kingdom) Josh Goodall	4–6, 6–3, 7–6^{(7–3)}
Win	3–7	Apr 2007	Great Britain F7, Bath	Futures	Hard	(United Kingdom) Ross Hutchins	(France) Thomas Oger (Croatia) Lovro Zovko	1–6, 6–4, 6–4
Win	4–7	Apr 2007	Great Britain F8, Bath	Futures	Hard	(Australia) Luke Bourgeois	(United Kingdom) Jamie Delgado (Croatia) Lovro Zovko	3–6, 5–3 ret.
Win	5–7	May 2007	Greece F2, Syros	Futures	Hard	(United Kingdom) Edward Corrie	(United Kingdom) Iain Atkinson (United Kingdom) Sean Thornley	6–3, 7–5
