= Mitch Michulka =

American tennis player

- Country (sports): United States
- Born: May 31, 1969 (age 57) Dallas, Texas

Singles
- Highest ranking: No. 579 (Oct 12, 1992)

Doubles
- Highest ranking: No. 287 (Nov 23, 1992)

Mitch Michulka (born May 31, 1969) is an American former professional tennis player.

Michulka played collegiate tennis for the University of Texas and earned All-American honors for doubles in 1990, reaching the NCAA Division I doubles final with Michael Penman.

On the professional tour, Michulka competed mostly on the satellite circuit but had one title win on the ATP Challenger Tour, partnering Mark Petchey in the doubles at Kuala Lumpur in 1992.

== ATP Challenger titles ==
=== Doubles: (1) ===
No.	Date	Tournament	Surface	Partner	Opponents	Score
1.	Nov 1992	Kuala Lumpur-2 Challenger; Kuala Lumpur, Malaysia	Hard	(United Kingdom) Mark Petchey	(Republic of Ireland) Owen Casey (United States) Donald Johnson	7–6, 6–1
