= Jason Weir-Smith =

South African tennis player

- Country (sports): South Africa
- Born: 8 August 1975 (age 50) Johannesburg, South Africa
- Height: 6 ft 2 in (188 cm)
- Turned pro: 1997
- Plays: Left-handed
- Prize money: $99,336

Singles
- Highest ranking: No. 548 (4 Oct 1999)

Doubles
- Career record: 16-30
- Career titles: 0
- Highest ranking: No. 81 (18 Jun 2001)

Grand Slam doubles results
- Australian Open: 1R (2001)
- French Open: 2R (2001)
- Wimbledon: 1R (2001)
- US Open: 2R (2001)

Jason Weir-Smith (born 8 August 1975) is a former professional tennis player from South Africa.

== Career ==
Weir-Smith won the doubles title at the Coffee Bowl junior tournament in 1993, with Juan Antonio Marín as his partner.

A doubles specialist, Weir-Smith played collegiate tennis at Texas Christian University and was a doubles All-American while playing with the Horned Frogs in 1996 and 1997.

The South African competed in the men's doubles at six Grand Slam tournaments during his career, including all four in 2001. He made the second round at the 2001 French Open (with Neville Godwin) and 2001 US Open (with Aleksandar Kitinov).

He never reached a final on the ATP Tour but was a doubles semi-finalist on four occasions, at Umag in 2000, the 2000 Brighton International, the 2001 Heineken Open in Auckland and Munich's BMW Open in 2001. His partner in Umag, Brighton and Auckland was Paul Rosner and he partnered John-Laffnie de Jager in Munich.

== Challenger titles ==
=== Doubles: (5) ===
| No. | Year | Tournament | Surface | Partner | Opponents | Score |
|---|---|---|---|---|---|---|
| 1. | 1999 | Eisenach, Germany | Clay | (United States) Mitch Sprengelmeyer | (Germany) Dirk Dier (Germany) Marcus Hilpert | 6–3, 6–1 |
| 2. | 1999 | Binghamton, United States | Hard | (United States) Mitch Sprengelmeyer | (United States) Kevin Kim (South Korea) Hyung-Taik Lee | 5–7, 6–4, 6–2 |
| 3. | 1999 | San Antonio, United States | Hard | (United States) Mitch Sprengelmeyer | (Australia) Andrew Painter (South Africa) Byron Talbot | 6–3, 7–6^{(8–6)} |
| 4. | 2000 | Segovia, Spain | Hard | (Australia) Ashley Fisher | (Australia) Jordan Kerr (South Africa) Damien Roberts | 7–6^{(7–5)}, 6–1 |
| 5. | 2001 | Wroclaw, Poland | Hard | (Zimbabwe) Wayne Black | (Austria) Julian Knowle (Germany) Michael Kohlmann | 6–3, 6–4 |
