= 1999 Bournemouth International =

Men's tennis tournament

- Date: 13–19 September
- Edition: 4th
- Category: International Series
- Surface: Clay / outdoor
- Location: Bournemouth, England

Champions

Singles
- (Romania) Adrian Voinea

Doubles
- (South Africa) David Adams / (United States) Jeff Tarango
← 1998 ·	Bournemouth International	· 2000 →

The 1999 Bournemouth International was a men's tennis tournament that took place between the 13 and 19 September 1999, on clay in Bournemouth. It was an International Series event which was part of the 1999 ATP Tour. Félix Mantilla was the defending champion but he lost in the first round to Kenneth Carlsen. Adrian Voinea defeated Stefan Koubek in the final.

== Finals ==
=== Singles ===
(Romania) Adrian Voinea defeated (Austria) Stefan Koubek 1–6, 7–5, 7–6^{(7–2)}

=== Doubles ===
(South Africa) David Adams / (United States) Jeff Tarango def. (Germany) Michael Kohlmann / (Sweden) Nicklas Kulti 6–3, 6–7^{(5–7)}, 7–6^{(7–5)}
