= Oliver Freelove =

British tennis player

- Full name: Oliver Freelove
- Country (sports): Great Britain
- Born: 5 March 1977 (age 48)
- Prize money: $34,497

Singles
- Career record: 0–1
- Highest ranking: No. 535 (28 May 2001)

Doubles
- Career record: 0–4
- Highest ranking: No. 259 (9 April 2001)

Grand Slam doubles results
- Wimbledon: 1R (2000, 2001)

Grand Slam mixed doubles results
- Wimbledon: 1R (2003)

Oliver Freelove (born 5 March 1977) is a British former professional tennis player.

== Biography ==
Freelove played collegiate tennis in the United States for the University of Illinois. He earned All-American honours in the 1998/99 season.

On the professional tour he was more successful as a doubles player, but featured in the singles at the 2000 Brighton International and won the first set of his opening round match against Diego Nargiso, before losing in three.

All of his Wimbledon main draw appearances came in doubles. He competed in the men's doubles with James Davidson in 2000 and then again in 2001 partnering Kyle Spencer, losing both first round matches in four sets. At the 2003 Wimbledon Championships he played with Helen Crook in the mixed doubles draw.

He is now in the finance industry and currently works for Marex Spectron.
