= Kyle Spencer (tennis) =

British tennis player

- Country (sports): United Kingdom
- Residence: Rancho Palos Verdes, California, United States
- Born: 26 January 1976 (age 49); Glasgow, Scotland, United Kingdom
- Height: 1.91 m (6 ft 3 in)
- Turned pro: 1998
- Plays: Right-handed
- Prize money: US $60,291

Singles
- Career record: 0–0
- Career titles: 0; 0 Challenger, 0 Futures
- Highest ranking: No. 953 (21 September 1998)

Doubles
- Career record: 6–15
- Career titles: 0; 0 Challenger, 2 Futures
- Highest ranking: No. 126 (17 July 2000)

Grand Slam doubles results
- Wimbledon: 1R (2000, 2001, 2002)
- US Open: Q1 (2000)

Other doubles tournaments
- Olympic Games: 1R (2000)

Grand Slam mixed doubles results
- Wimbledon: 2R (2002)
- Last updated on: 28 July 2022.

Kyle Spencer (born 26 January 1976) is a former tennis player from the United Kingdom.

Spencer represented the United Kingdom in the men's doubles competition at the 2000 Summer Olympics in Sydney, partnering Barry Cowan. The pair was eliminated in the first round.

Spencer's highest ranking in singles was World No. 953, which he reached on 21 September 1998. His highest doubles ranking was World No. 126, which he reached on 17 July 2000.

Spencer has coached U.S. college tennis teams at Baylor University, University of Maryland, and North Carolina State University.

== ATP career finals ==
=== Doubles: 1 (1 runner-up) ===
Legend Grand Slam Tournaments (0–0) ATP World Tour Finals (0–0) ATP Masters 1000 Series (0–0) ATP 500 Series (0–0) ATP 250 Series (0–1)	Finals by surface Hard (0–0) Clay (0–0) Grass (0–1) Carpet (0–0)	Finals by setting Outdoors (0–1) Indoors (0–0)

Result	W–L	Date	Tournament	Tier	Surface	Partner	Opponents	Score
Loss	0–1	Jul 2000	Newport, United States	International Series	Grass	(United States) Mitch Sprengelmeyer	(Israel) Jonathan Erlich (Israel) Harel Levy	6–7^{(2–7)}, 5–7

== ATP Challenger and ITF Futures finals ==
=== Doubles: 9 (2–7) ===
Legend ATP Challenger (0–4) ITF Futures (2–3)	Finals by surface Hard (0–5) Clay (1–0) Grass (0–0) Carpet (1–2)

Result	W–L	Date	Tournament	Tier	Surface	Partner	Opponents	Score
Win	1–0	Jun 1998	USA F4, Tallahassee	Futures	Clay	(United States) Cecil Mamiit	(Canada) Jocelyn Robichaud (United States) Michael Russell	3–6, 6–1, 6–2
Loss	1–1	Sep 1998	France F6, Mulhouse	Futures	Hard	(South Africa) Louis Vosloo	(United States) Andrew Rueb (South Africa) Vaughan Snyman	4–6, 1–6
Win	2–1	Feb 1999	Great Britain F3, Eastbourne	Futures	Carpet	(United Kingdom) James Davidson	(Czech Republic) Leoš Friedl (France) Régis Lavergne	7–6, 6–4
Loss	2–2	Oct 1999	Japan F6, Fukuoka	Futures	Carpet	(United States) Michael Joyce	(Japan) Tasuku Iwami (Japan) Ryuso Tsujino	6–4, 6–7, 4–6
Loss	2–3	Nov 1999	Yokohama, Japan	Challenger	Carpet	(United States) Michael Joyce	(Japan) Satoshi Iwabuchi (Japan) Thomas Shimada	2–6, 4–6
Loss	2–4	Feb 2000	Wrocław, Poland	Challenger	Hard	(Canada) Jocelyn Robichaud	(Czech Republic) Petr Kovačka (Czech Republic) Pavel Kudrnáč	6–3, 6–7^{(8–6)}, 4–6
Loss	2–5	Mar 2001	Singapore, Singapore	Challenger	Hard	(United States) Brandon Hawk	(Australia) Tim Crichton (Australia) Ashley Fisher	6–3, 3–6, 4–6
Loss	2–6	Sep 2001	Tarzana, United States	Challenger	Hard	(United States) Glenn Weiner	(United States) Michael Joyce (United States) Zack Fleishman	1–6, 7–5, 6–7^{(6–8)}
Loss	2–7	Oct 2005	France F16, Nevers	Futures	Hard	(United Kingdom) David Sherwood	(France) Julien Jeanpierre (France) Jean-Michel Pequery	4–6, 7–6^{(9–7)}, 5–7

== Performance timeline ==
Key
W	F	SF	QF	#R	RR	Q#	P#	DNQ	A	Z#	PO	G	S	B	NMS	NTI	P	NH

(W) winner; (F) finalist; (SF) semifinalist; (QF) quarterfinalist; (#R) rounds 4, 3, 2, 1; (RR) round-robin stage; (Q#) qualification round; (P#) preliminary round; (DNQ) did not qualify; (A) absent; (Z#) Davis/Fed Cup Zonal Group (with number indication) or (PO) play-off; (G) gold, (S) silver or (B) bronze Olympic/Paralympic medal; (NMS) not a Masters tournament; (NTI) not a Tier I tournament; (P) postponed; (NH) not held; (SR) strike rate (events won / competed); (W–L) win–loss record.

=== Doubles ===
Tournament	1996	1997	1998	1999	2000	2001	2002	SR	W–L	Win%
Grand Slam tournaments
Australian Open	A	A	A	A	A	A	A	0 / 0	0–0	–
French Open	A	A	A	A	A	A	A	0 / 0	0–0	–
Wimbledon	Q1	A	A	Q1	1R	1R	1R	0 / 3	0–3	0%
US Open	A	A	A	A	Q1	A	A	0 / 0	0–0	–
Win–loss	0–0	0–0	0–0	0–0	0–1	0–1	0–1	0 / 3	0–3	0%
Olympic Games
Summer Olympics	A	Not Held			1R	NH		0 / 1	0–1	0%
ATP Tour Masters 1000
Indian Wells	A	A	Q1	A	A	A	A	0 / 0	0–0	–
Canada	A	A	A	2R	A	A	A	0 / 1	1–1	50%
Cincinnati	A	A	A	A	Q2	A	A	0 / 0	0–0	–
Win–loss	0–0	0–0	0–0	1–1	0–0	0–0	0–0	0 / 1	1–1	50%
