= Mitch Sprengelmeyer =

American tennis player (born 1975)

- Country (sports): United States
- Residence: Pendleton, South Carolina
- Born: January 9, 1975 (age 51) Boulder, Colorado, U.S.
- Height: 6 ft 1 in (185 cm)
- Turned pro: 1997
- Plays: Left-handed
- Prize money: $71,636

Singles
- Highest ranking: No. 814 (August 10, 1998)

Doubles
- Career record: 9-20
- Career titles: 0
- Highest ranking: No. 92 (July 9, 2001)

Grand Slam doubles results
- Australian Open: 1R (2000)
- French Open: 2R (2001)
- Wimbledon: 1R (2001)
- US Open: 1R (1999, 2000)

Mitchell Dell "Mitch" Sprengelmeyer (born January 9, 1975) is a former professional tennis player from the United States.

== Career ==
Sprengelmeyer, a three time All-American, played collegiate tennis for Clemson University from 1994 to 1997. In 1997, Sprengelmeyer was the NCAA ITA Senior Player of the Year and also won the Van Nostrand Memorial Award, the first person to win both in the same year. Sprengelmeyer was also named ACC Player of the Year in 1997.

Sprengelmeyer competed in the men's doubles at seven Grand Slam tournaments, winning a Grand Slam match at the 2001 French Open, with Aleksandar Kitinov. They defeated Jan Siemerink and Grant Stafford, then lost in the second round to Max Mirnyi and David Prinosil. In the 2001 Wimbledon Championships, Sprengelmeyer also played in the mixed doubles, partnering Lilia Osterloh. He and partner Kyle Spencer were doubles runners-up at the 2000 Hall of Fame Tennis Championships, an ATP Tour tournament, in Newport.

Sprengelmeyer has three career wins over the Bryan Brothers. The first win was with Adam Peterson at a Challenger event in Texas, and the other two wins were with Mark Merklein in back-to-back finals of Challenger events in California, the Bryan Brother's home state.

== ATP career finals ==
=== Doubles: 1 (0–1) ===
Result	No.	Year	Tournament	Surface	Partner	Opponents	Score
Loss	1.	Jul 2000	Newport, United States	Grass	(United Kingdom) Kyle Spencer	(Israel) Jonathan Erlich (Israel) Harel Levy	6–7^{(2–7)}, 5–7

== Challenger titles ==
=== Doubles: (7) ===
No.	Year	Tournament	Surface	Partner	Opponents	Score
1.	1999	Eisenach, Germany	Clay	(South Africa) Jason Weir-Smith	(Germany) Dirk Dier (Germany) Marcus Hilpert	6–3, 6–1
2.	1999	Binghamton, United States	Hard	(South Africa) Jason Weir-Smith	(United States) Kevin Kim (South Korea) Hyung-Taik Lee	5–7, 6–4, 6–2
3.	1999	San Antonio, United States	Hard	(South Africa) Jason Weir-Smith	(Australia) Andrew Painter (South Africa) Byron Talbot	6–3, 7–6^{(8–6)}
4.	2000	Burbank, United States	Hard	(The Bahamas) Mark Merklein	(United States) Bob Bryan (United States) Mike Bryan	7–6^{(7–5)}, 7–5
5.	2000	Rancho Mirage, United States	Hard	(The Bahamas) Mark Merklein	(United States) Bob Bryan (United States) Mike Bryan	6–4, 3–6, 7–6^{(7–3)}
6.	2001	Rocky Mount, United States	Clay	(The Bahamas) Mark Merklein	(Australia) Paul Kilderry (Australia) Peter Tramacchi	7–5, 7–6^{(9–7)}
7.	2001	Venice, Italy	Clay	(The Bahamas) Mark Merklein	(Peru) Luis Horna (Argentina) Sebastián Prieto	6–4, 7–6^{(9–7)}
