= Harel Levy =

Israeli tennis player

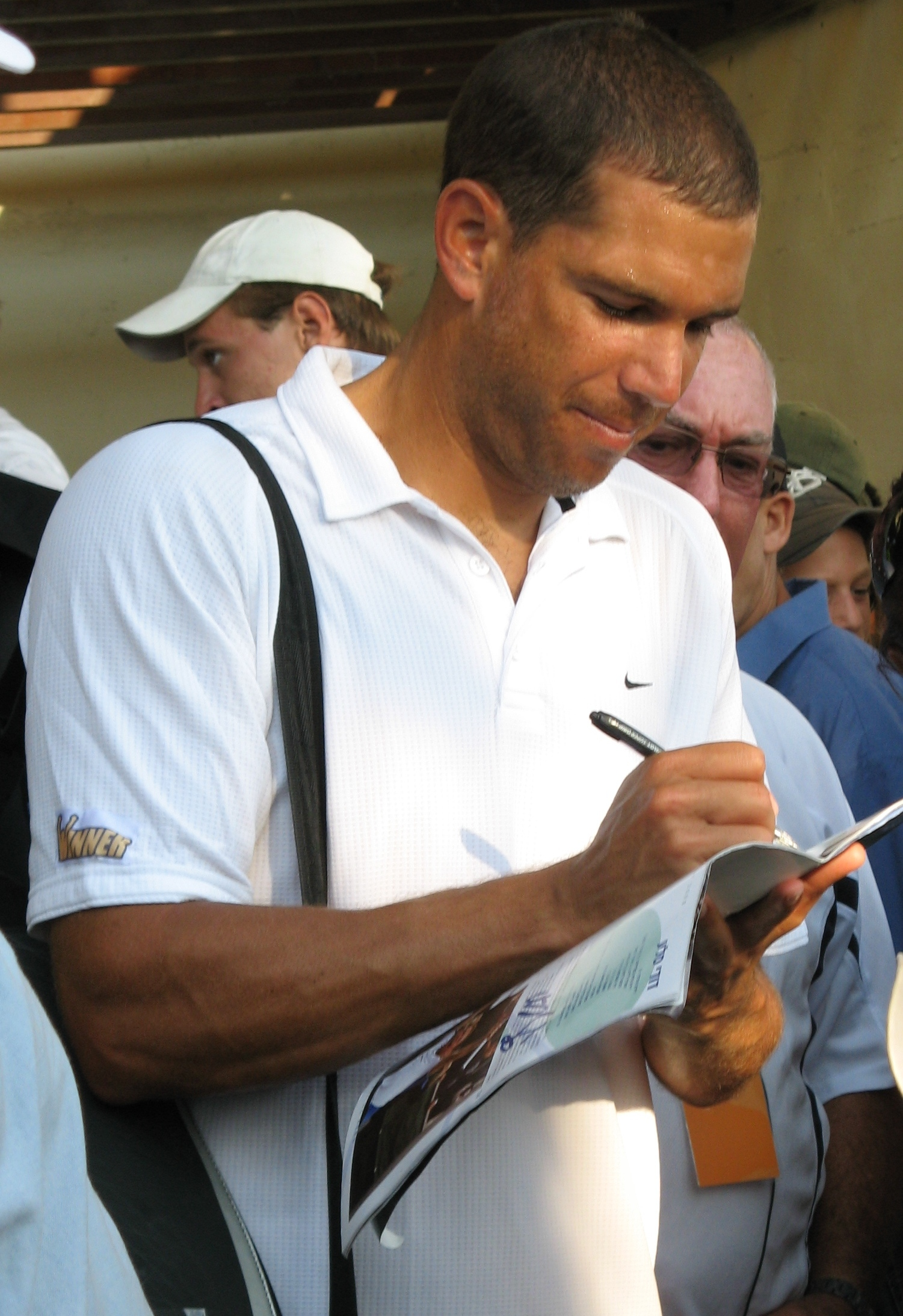
- Native name: הראל לוי
- Country (sports): Israel
- Residence: Ramat HaSharon, Israel
- Born: 5 August 1978 (age 48) Nahshonim, Israel
- Height: 1.85 m (6 ft 1 in)
- Turned pro: 1995
- Retired: 2011
- Plays: Right-handed (one-handed backhand)
- Prize money: $1,579,908

Singles
- Career record: 63–99
- Career titles: 0
- Highest ranking: No. 30 (25 June 2001)

Grand Slam singles results
- Australian Open: 2R (2001)
- French Open: 2R (2001)
- Wimbledon: 2R (2000)
- US Open: 2R (2002)

Doubles
- Career record: 38–51
- Career titles: 1
- Highest ranking: No. 71 (19 May 2008)

Grand Slam doubles results
- Australian Open: 2R (2006)
- French Open: 2R (2006)
- Wimbledon: QF (2007)
- US Open: 1R (2001, 2007)

Team competitions
- Davis Cup: SF (2009)
- Last updated on: 24 September 2021.

Harel Levy (Hebrew: הראל לוי; born 5 August 1978) is a retired Israeli professional tennis player, and the current captain of Israel's Davis Cup team. He reached the final of the 2000 Toronto Masters and achieved a career-high singles ranking of World No. 30 (June 2001), with his best doubles ranking being World No. 71 in May 2008. Levy was a key factor in Israel's semifinal run in the 2009 Davis Cup.

In a career interrupted first by Israeli Army service and later by serious right hip surgery in 2001, Levy notably scored victories over Pete Sampras, Andy Roddick, Michael Chang and Wayne Ferreira. As well as reaching the singles final of the 2000 Toronto Masters, he finished runner-up at Nottingham in 2001 and won a doubles title in Newport, Rhode Island.

In September 2017, Levy was named the captain of Israel's Davis Cup team.

== Early and personal life ==
Levy was born in Nahshonim, Israel, and is Jewish. Levy, Noam Okun, and Dudi Sela were Israel's top singles players a number of years, and were among a number of Jewish professional tennis players.

Levy is a good friend of Brazilian tennis champion Gustavo Kuerten, with whom Levy has often been a hitting partner.

Levy is a fan of the soccer team Maccabi Haifa.

== Tennis career ==
Levy began playing tennis at age seven. His family moved to Portugal for a year and half when he was nine years old. They returned to Israel, and in 1992 the family moved to Ramat HaSharon so he could train at the Israel Tennis Centers there. That year, he was No. 1 in the under-14 age group in Israel.

=== 1995–99 ===
After turning pro in 1995, Levy served his required time in the Israeli military, but the IDF (Israel Defense Forces) allowed him to compete in events during his service.

In March 1998 he and Lior Mor won in Israel, defeating Barry Cowan and Filippo Veglio in the final. In June he and partner Raviv Weidenfeld won in Ireland, defeating Daniele Braccoalo and Igor Gaudi 7–6, 6–4 in the final. In July he and Mor won in Greece, defeating Gilles Elseneer and Wim Neefs in the final.

In July 1999 while ranked No. 241 he beat Michael Chang, formerly ranked No 2 in the world, at the Safeway Challenger in Aptos, California. In August 1999 at Indianapolis he defeated world No. 40 Jiří Novák. In September he and partner Noam Okun won at Budapest, defeating Daniel Fiala and Leoš Friedl in the final.

=== 2000–04 ===
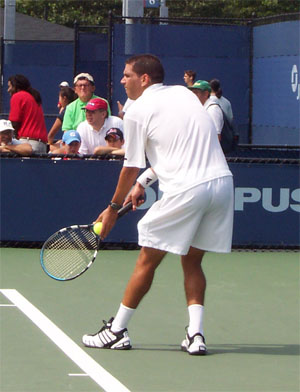
Harel Levy at the 2004 U.S. Open

In January 2000 he and partner Jonathan Erlich won at Orlando, Florida, defeating Óscar Ortiz and Jimy Szymanski in the final. In July they won at Newport, Rhode Island, defeating Kyle Spencer and Mitch Sprengelmeyer in the final of the Hall of Fame tennis championships.

In July 2000 at the Tennis Masters Series-Canada tournament in Toronto, while ranked only 144th in the world, he used whiplike ground strokes, a tantalizing drop shot, and winners off his one-handed to beat world No. 73 Martin Damm, No. 47 Stefan Koubek, No. 27 Sébastien Grosjean, No. 61 Jérôme Golmard, and No. 55 Jiří Novák, before losing in the finals to No. 9 Marat Safin. Levy more than doubled his career earnings with the $211,000 runner-up prize. Levy was the first Israeli to reach an ATP Tour final since Amos Mansdorf in 1994, and jumped to No. 70 in the world rankings.

Levy completed his three years of military service in the IDF in August 2000.

In March 2001 he upset world No. 10 Tim Henman of Great Britain at Scottsdale.

In May 2001 Levy upset the world's top player, Pete Sampras, at the Italian Open, saving 13 of 17 break points. In his next match at the tournament, he beat world No. 33 Francisco Clavet, and then whipped Nicolas Kiefer, winning 80% of his first serves. Levy played down his achievements by joking that he was more depressed by his Israeli soccer team (Maccabi Haifa) losing that week than excited by his success. "I still like soccer much more than tennis", he shrugged. In the quarterfinals he subsequently lost to Sweden's Andreas Vinciguerra.

In June 2001 Levy upset world No. 17 Wayne Ferreira of South Africa. He then beat world No. 40 Andy Roddick, with powerful groundstrokes and spinning drop shots, while sustaining a right hip injury. At one point, Roddick prostrated himself on the court, worshiping with outstretched arms in Levy's direction after Levy had gone up 40–0 on Roddick's serve on three cross-court passes. "He'd produced three running passing shots in a row", Roddick explained. "My approach play hadn't been bad. He just came up with power and speed and there was nothing I could do about it at all." Levy lost in the finals of the Nottingham Tournament in England to Thomas Johansson of Sweden, despite his use of what had become by then his trademark drop volleys. In late June he retired from his first round Wimbledon match with a hip injury. On 25 June, at the age of 22, he reached the ranking of No. 30 in the world.

In November 2001 Levy flew to the US for arthroscopic surgery for an injured knee, and also had complicated right hip surgery to address his injury in Nottingham. He spent six months home in Ramat Ha-Sharon, a suburb of Tel Aviv, recuperating, and in April 2002 returned to playing tennis.

Levy was hampered by injuries for much of the 2002 season. By July 2002, his ranking had dropped to 326. The following month he said: "I'm not going to be back to a hundred percent, but if I get back to 90%, I'll be very happy."

At the US Open in 2002 he defeated world No. 30 Andrei Pavel. A partisan crowd cheered him on. Asked how much the crowd helped him, Levy shrugged: "In percentages, you want? OK, around 23½."

At the Forest Hills Tennis Classic in May 2003, Levy defeated top-seeded world No. 96 Justin Gimelstob 6–2, 6–3.

At the qualifying tournament for Wimbledon in 2003, Levy defeated Paul Goldstein in the first round, and reached the 3rd round before losing. In September 2003, Levy and partner Paul Baccanello of Australia won the doubles title at the Open de l'Isère, defeating Rik de Voest and Johan Landsberg in Grenoble, France. Levy also reached the singles final at the tournament. Later that month he paired with Amir Hadad to defeat Fred Hemmes Jr. and Raemon Sluiter to win in Groningen, the Netherlands. In October he and Hadad defeated Scott Humphries and Mark Merklein to win in Nottingham, England. Levy was back in peak form at the Dnipropetrovsk tournament in November 2003. He reached the singles final before succumbing to Georgian Irakli Labadze 3–6, 6–3, 1–6. Levy fared better in the doubles tournament where, along with partner Jonathan Erlich he won the title in straight sets, over Simon Aspelin and Johan Landsberg. He and Erlich also won that month at Bratislava, Slovakia, defeating Mario Ančić and Martin García in the final. He finished 2003 ranked 111th in the world in singles.

=== 2005–2011 ===
The doubles performances of Levy and his partner Amir Hadad in the months of April and May 2005, were impressive. In late April the Israelis captured the Hungary F1 tournament in Budapest, defeating Nikola Martinović and Joško Topić 5–7, 6–2, 6–1 in the final. A few days later they won the F2 title in Miskolc as well, beating Bastian Knittel and Marius Zay in the final. Levy and Hadad then competed in May in the German town of Furth, where they took the title from Jan Frode Andersen and Johan Landsberg. In July they won at Budaors, Hungary, defeating Adam Chadaj and Stéphane Robert.

In 2005 Levy won the USTA Tulsa Challenger, beating Benedikt Dorsch of Germany, the reigning NCAA men's singles champion, in a three-hour duel. In September 2005 he and partner Noam Okun won in Istanbul, Turkey, defeating David Škoch and Martin Štěpánek in the final, 6–4, 7–5.

In January 2006, a right shoulder injury forced him to retire from a Sydney ATP singles match, and sidelined him for a week. In June 2006 he and Giorgio Galimberti won in Milan, Italy, defeating Frederico Gil and Juan Albert Viloca in the final, 6–3, 6–3. In August he and partner Sam Warburg won in the Bronx, New York, defeating Scott Lipsky and David Martin in the Bronx Classic final, 6–4, 7–5.

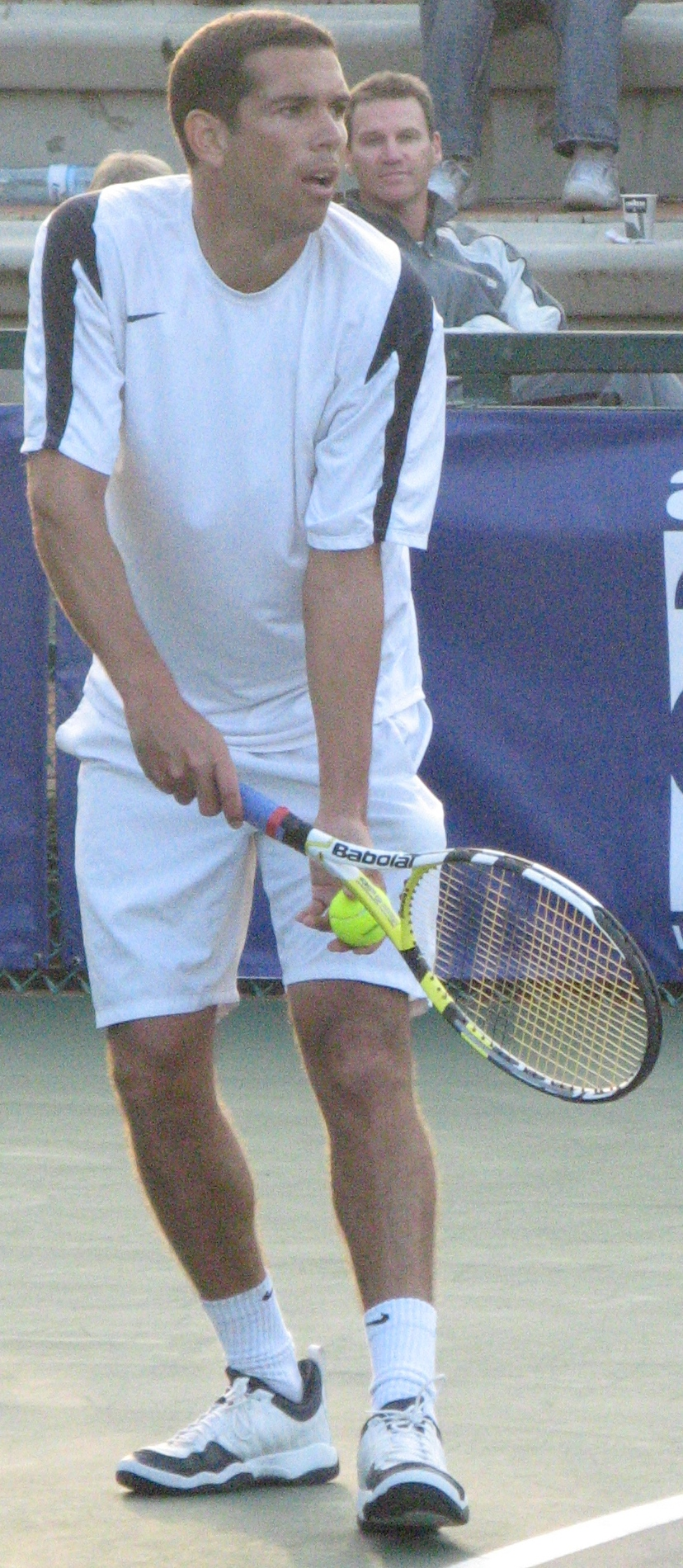
Levy at 2008 Israel Tennis Championship

In early 2007 Levy was suspended from all competition for three months by the Israel Tennis Federation for failing to participate in a State Cup tennis match that the ITF had organized. In April 2007 he and Warburg won at Valencia, California, defeating Cecil Mamiit and Eric Taino in the final. In June they won at Yuba City, California, defeating Eric Nuñez and Jean-Julien Rojer in the final. In July 2007 Levy and Rajeev Ram competed together in doubles at Wimbledon, where they made it through the qualifying rounds and to the quarterfinals – Levy's best grand slam showing to date. On their way they defeated 15th-seeded Martín García and Sebastián Prieto in five sets in the third round. They lost in the quarters to No. 10 seeds Arnaud Clément and Michaël Llodra, 6–3, 6–2, 6–2. Later in July, Levy, who had slipped to 264 in the world rankings since his surgery, won a challenger title in Manchester, Great Britain, beating Travis Rettenmaier 6–2, 6–4 in the final.

In the men's final of the Israeli Championship in December 2007 Levy, who had won the title in 1997, 1999, and 2002, defeated Dekel Valtzer, 6–0, 6–1. By December, Levy had risen 125 places in 2007. His coach, Oded Jacob, said: "Levy suffered a very serious injury in 2001 from which some players have never managed to recover. He went through some very difficult years of physical and mental recuperation. I think he's recovered from that now, and I feel he's learned to come to terms with the fact that he's no longer No. 30 in the world. His goal now is to return to the top 100."

In December 2008 Levy claimed the fifth Israeli championship title of his career, beating Dudi Sela 6–4, 3–6, 7–5. "I won the match because I always believed I would", said Levy. In doubles Levy and Noam Okun lost in the finals to Andy Ram and Noam Behr, 6–1, 6–4.

Levy decided at the beginning of 2009 to enter slowly reduce his participation in singles tournaments, and put an emphasis on his doubles career with Noam Okun. But after his Davis Cup win in Sweden, he changed his plans. To prepare for the tie with Russia, he realized he had to once again stress his singles career, and while he kept playing doubles, he played singles anywhere possible.

=== Davis Cup ===
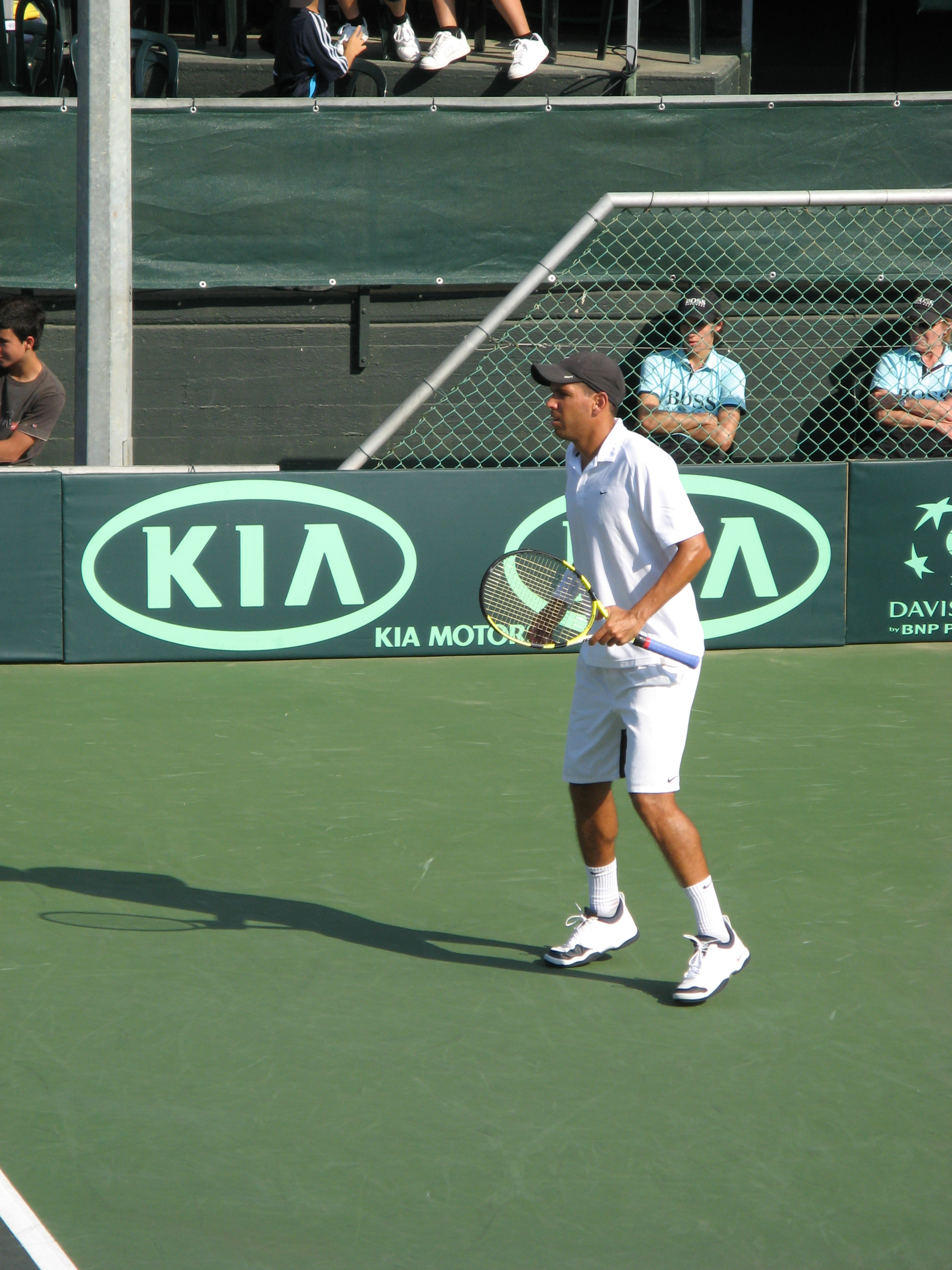
Levy Playing Davis Cup

Levy played for Israel's Davis Cup team starting in 1998, with a 22–15 record through July 2009. In 2008 he played in a tie against Sweden, in which he was not victorious in the final and deciding match. However, he redeemed Israel and himself in 2009 against Sweden.

In September 2008 against the Peru Davis Cup team, after losing one match in singles to Luis Horna 7–5, 5–7, 7–6^{(3)}, 6–3, Levy paired with Andy Ram to win the doubles tie 6–1, 6–1, 6–2, as Israel won 4–1.

In the 2009 World Group Playoffs in March 2009, Israel again faced Sweden. 2002 Australian Open champion Thomas Johansson defeated Levy in the opening match, 6–7^{(3)}, 6–4, 7–5, 4–6, 8–6, in just under 4 hours, but Levy won the decisive final match against Andreas Vinciguerra in Vinciguerra's hometown of Malmö, Sweden, 6–4, 4–6, 6–4, 3–6, 8–6 in a marathon 3 hour, 44 minutes to lead the Israeli team to a come-from-behind 3–2 victory over the 7-time Davis Cup champion Swedes at Baltic Hall, allowing Israel to advance in the 2009 Davis Cup. In their 84-year Davis Cup history, the Swedes had never before lost a tie after holding a 2–1 lead.

"I had a coach who always told me that I'm a winner, and that I will always be one. The press labeled me as a loser when I wasn't doing well, and now they say I'm a winner. I know my worth, and I proved to myself that I can still win big matches", Levy said. He added: "Despite all the difficult years, scouring the globe to play in small tournaments with little success, I'm now experiencing a joy that has made it all worthwhile."

Israel (ranked 8th in the Davis Cup standings, with 5,394 points) hosted heavily favored Russia (which won in both 2002 and 2006, and was the top-ranked country in Davis Cup standings, with 27,897 points) in a Davis Cup quarterfinal tie in July 2009, on indoor hard courts at the Nokia Arena in Tel Aviv. Israel was represented by Levy, Dudi Sela, Jonathan Erlich, and Andy Ram. Russia's lineup consisted of Marat Safin (No. 24 in the world; former world No. 1), Igor Andreev (26), Igor Kunitsyn (35), and Mikhail Youzhny (44; former world No. 8). "I believe we can do it against Russia", predicted Levy. The stage was set by Safin, who prior to the tie told the press: "With all due respect, Israel was lucky to get to the quarterfinals." The Israeli team's response was to beat the Russian team in each of their first three matches, thereby winning the tie. Levy was aware that the Russians thought he was incapable of playing at their level, let alone beating Russia's top player, Andreev. Levy, ranked world No. 210, beat Andreev, world No. 24, 6–4, 6–2, 4–6, 6–2 in the opening match. Levy said: "I had a feeling Andreev couldn't hurt me in any way, while I could do almost anything, and that made me very calm. I forced him to feel very uncomfortable on the court, lowering his confidence, and his game became more simple." Sela (No. 33) followed by beating Russian Youzhny 3–6, 6–1, 6–0, 7–5. Israeli captain Eyal Ran likened his players to two fighter jets on the court. The 10,500 spectators were the largest crowd ever for a tennis match in Israel.

The next day Israelis Ram and Erlich beat Safin and Kunitsyn 6–3, 6–4, 6–7^{(3)}, 4–6, 6–4 in front of a boisterous crowd of over 10,000. Ran was carried shoulder-high around the Tel Aviv stadium, as the 10,000-strong crowd applauded. With the tie clinched for Israel, the reverse singles rubbers were "dead", and instead of best-of-five matches, best-of-three sets were played, with the outcomes of little to no importance. Israel wrapped up a 4–1 victory over Russia, as Levy defeated Kunitsyn 6–4, 4–6, 7–6^{(2)}, while Sela retired with a wrist injury while down 3–4 in the first set against Andreev.

Israel next faced the Spanish Davis Cup team in Spain, in Israel's first appearance in the Davis Cup semifinals.

== Captain of Israel Davis Cup Team ==
In September 2017, Levy was named the captain of Israel's Davis Cup team, taking over from Eyal Ran.

== ATP career finals ==
=== Singles: 2 (2 runner-ups) ===
Legend Grand Slam tournaments (0–0) ATP World Tour Finals (0–0) ATP World Tour Masters 1000 (0–1) ATP World Tour 500 Series (0–0) ATP World Tour 250 Series (0–1)	Titles by surface Hard (0–1) Clay (0–0) Grass (0–1)	Titles by setting Outdoor (0–2) Indoor (0–0)

Result	W–L	Date	Tournament	Tier	Surface	Opponent	Score
Loss	0–1	Aug 2000	Toronto, Canada	Masters 1000	Hard	(Russia) Marat Safin	2–6, 3–6
Loss	0–2	Jun 2001	Nottingham, United Kingdom	250 Series	Grass	(Sweden) Thomas Johansson	5–7, 3–6

=== Doubles: 2 (1 title, 1 runner-up) ===
Legend Grand Slam tournaments (0–0) ATP World Tour Finals (0–0) ATP World Tour Masters 1000 (0–0) ATP World Tour 500 Series (0–0) ATP World Tour 250 Series (1–1)	Titles by surface Hard (0–1) Clay (0–0) Grass (1–0)	Titles by setting Outdoor (1–1) Indoor (0–0)

Result	W–L	Date	Tournament	Tier	Surface	Partner	Opponents	Score
Win	1–0	Jul 2000	Newport, United States	250 Series	Grass	(Israel) Jonathan Erlich	(United Kingdom) Kyle Spencer (United States) Mitch Sprengelmeyer	7–6^{(7–2)}, 7–5
Loss	1–1	Feb 2010	Johannesburg, South Africa	250 Series	Hard	(Slovakia) Karol Beck	(India) Rohan Bopanna (Pakistan) Aisam Qureshi	6–2, 3–6, [5–10]

== ATP Challenger and ITF Futures finals ==
=== Singles: 16 (11–5) ===
Legend ATP Challenger (4–3) ITF Futures (7–2)	Finals by surface Hard (8–5) Clay (2–0) Grass (1–0) Carpet (0–0)

Result	W–L	Date	Tournament	Tier	Surface	Opponent	Score
Win	1–0	Mar 1998	Israel F1, Jaffa	Futures	Hard	(Israel) Noam Behr	6–3, 6–2
Loss	1–1	Jul 1998	Greece F6, Veria	Futures	Hard	(Israel) Lior Mor	4–6, 4–6
Win	2–1	Jul 1998	Greece F7, Athens	Futures	Clay	(Belgium) Wim Neefs	6–0, 6–1
Win	3–1	Jun 1999	Italy F10, Pavia	Futures	Clay	(Greece) Vasilis Mazarakis	6–4, 7–5
Loss	3–2	Jul 1999	Aptos, United States	Challenger	Hard	(Australia) Michael Hill	7–6, 4–6, 2–6
Win	4–2	Aug 1999	Lexington, United States	Challenger	Hard	(United States) Kevin Kim	6–4, 7–6
Win	5–2	Jan 2000	USA F1, Pembroke Pines	Futures	Hard	(France) Rodolphe Gilbert	7–6^{(7–5)}, 4–6, 6–2
Loss	5–3	Sep 2003	Grenoble, France	Challenger	Hard	(France) Richard Gasquet	5–7, 6–7^{(1–7)}
Loss	5–4	Nov 2003	Dnipropetrovsk, Ukraine	Challenger	Hard	(Georgia (country)) Irakli Labadze	3–6, 6–3, 1–6
Win	6–4	Oct 2005	Tulsa, United States	Challenger	Hard	(Germany) Benedikt Dorsch	5–7, 7–5, 7–6^{(8–6)}
Win	7–4	Mar 2007	Israel F3, Ra'anana	Futures	Hard	(Germany) Alexander Satschko	7–6^{(7–4)}, 6–3
Win	8–4	Jul 2007	Manchester, United Kingdom	Challenger	Grass	(United States) Travis Rettenmaier	6–2, 6–4
Win	9–4	Dec 2007	Israel F5, Ramat HaSharon	Futures	Hard	(Bulgaria) Todor Enev	6–4, 6–0
Loss	9–5	Feb 2009	Israel F2, Eilat	Futures	Hard	(Israel) Noam Okun	4–6, 4–6
Win	10–5	Feb 2009	Israel F3, Eilat	Futures	Hard	(Israel) Noam Okun	walkover
Win	11–5	Jul 2009	Lexington, United States	Challenger	Hard	(United States) Alex Kuznetsov	6–4, 4–6, 6–2

=== Doubles: 47 (26–21) ===
Legend ATP Challenger (18–17) ITF Futures (8–4)	Finals by surface Hard (16–14) Clay (9–5) Grass (0–1) Carpet (1–1)

Result	W–L	Date	Tournament	Tier	Surface	Partner	Opponents	Score
Win	1–0	Mar 1998	Israel F2, Ashkelon	Futures	Hard	(Israel) Lior Mor	(United Kingdom) Barry Cowan (Switzerland) Filippo Veglio	6–4, 7–6
Win	2–0	Jun 1998	Ireland F1, Dublin	Futures	Carpet	(Israel) Raviv Weidenfeld	(Italy) Daniele Bracciali (Italy) Igor Gaudi	7–6, 6–4
Win	3–0	Jul 1998	Greece F7, Athens	Futures	Clay	(Israel) Lior Mor	(Belgium) Gilles Elseneer (Belgium) Wim Neefs	6–3, 0–6, 6–3
Loss	3–1	Mar 1999	Israel F2, Ashkelon	Futures	Hard	(Israel) Amir Hadad	(Israel) Eyal Erlich (Israel) Jonathan Erlich	4–6, 2–6
Loss	3–2	Jun 1999	Italy F10, Pavia	Futures	Clay	(France) Maxime Boyé	(Hungary) Gergely Kisgyörgy (Australia) Dejan Petrovic	7–6, 3–6, 1–6
Loss	3–3	Jul 1999	Granby, Canada	Challenger	Hard	(Israel) Lior Mor	(United States) Kevin Kim (Venezuela) Jimy Szymanski	6–4, 1–6, 4–6
Loss	3–4	Jul 1999	Aptos, United States	Challenger	Hard	(Israel) Lior Mor	(United States) Scott Humphries (Australia) Michael Hill	6–7, 6–1, 5–7
Win	4–4	Sep 1999	Budapest, Hungary	Challenger	Clay	(Israel) Noam Okun	(Czech Republic) Daniel Fiala (Czech Republic) Leoš Friedl	6–4, 4–6, 6–2
Win	5–4	Jan 2000	USA F2, Altamonte Springs	Futures	Hard	(Israel) Jonathan Erlich	(Mexico) Óscar Ortiz (Venezuela) Jimy Szymanski	6–3, 6–4
Loss	5–5	Feb 2003	Great Britain F2, Nottingham	Futures	Carpet	(Israel) Jonathan Erlich	(United Kingdom) Mark Hilton (Israel) Andy Ram	6–7^{(7–9)}, 2–6
Loss	5–6	Mar 2003	Salinas, Ecuador	Challenger	Hard	(Germany) Michael Kohlmann	(Argentina) Martín García (Argentina) Sebastián Prieto	walkover
Loss	5–7	Sep 2003	Istanbul, Turkey	Challenger	Hard	(Israel) Amir Hadad	(Israel) Jonathan Erlich (Israel) Andy Ram	6–7^{(5–7)}, 6–7^{(6–8)}
Win	6–7	Sep 2003	Grenoble, France	Challenger	Hard	(Australia) Paul Baccanello	(South Africa) Rik de Voest (Sweden) Johan Landsberg	5–7, 6–4, 7–6^{(7–5)}
Win	7–7	Oct 2003	Groningen, Netherlands	Challenger	Hard	(Israel) Amir Hadad	(Netherlands) Fred Hemmes (Netherlands) Raemon Sluiter	6–4, 6–4
Win	8–7	Nov 2003	Nottingham, United Kingdom	Challenger	Hard	(Israel) Amir Hadad	(United States) Scott Humphries (The Bahamas) Mark Knowles	6–4, 6–7^{(3–7)}, 6–3
Win	9–7	Nov 2003	Bratislava, Slovakia	Challenger	Hard	(Israel) Jonathan Erlich	(Croatia) Mario Ančić (Argentina) Martín García	7–6^{(9–7)}, 6–3
Win	10–7	Nov 2003	Dnipropetrovsk, Ukraine	Challenger	Hard	(Israel) Jonathan Erlich	(Sweden) Simon Aspelin (Sweden) Johan Landsberg	6–4, 6–3
Loss	10–8	Jul 2004	Granby, Canada	Challenger	Hard	(Italy) Davide Sanguinetti	(Canada) Frank Dancevic (United States) Brian Baker	2–6, 6–7^{(5–7)}
Loss	10–9	Jan 2005	Nouméa, New Caledonia	Challenger	Hard	(France) Jérôme Golmard	(Australia) Stephen Huss (South Africa) Wesley Moodie	3–6, 0–6
Win	11–9	May 2005	Hungary F1, Budapest	Futures	Clay	(Israel) Amir Hadad	(Croatia) Nikola Martinovic (Croatia) Joško Topić	5–7, 6–2, 6–1
Win	12–9	May 2005	Hungary F2, Miskolc	Futures	Clay	(Israel) Amir Hadad	(Germany) Bastian Knittel (Germany) Marius Zay	6–1, 6–0
Loss	12–10	May 2005	Budapest, Hungary	Challenger	Clay	(Israel) Amir Hadad	(Australia) Stephen Huss (Sweden) Johan Landsberg	6–7^{(4–7)}, 1–6
Win	13–10	Jun 2005	Furth, Germany	Challenger	Clay	(Israel) Amir Hadad	(Norway) Jan-Frode Andersen (Sweden) Johan Landsberg	6–1, 6–2
Loss	13–11	Jun 2005	Košice, Slovakia	Challenger	Clay	(Sweden) Johan Landsberg	(Czech Republic) Petr Luxa (Slovakia) Igor Zelenay	4–6, 2–6
Win	14–11	Jul 2005	Budaors, Hungary	Challenger	Clay	(Israel) Amir Hadad	(Poland) Adam Chadaj (France) Stéphane Robert	6–4, 6–7^{(7–9)}, 6–3
Loss	14–12	Jul 2005	Aptos, United States	Challenger	Hard	(Israel) Noam Okun	(Australia) Nathan Healey (United States) Eric Taino	5–7, 6–7^{(4–7)}
Win	15–12	Sep 2005	Istanbul, Turkey	Challenger	Hard	(Israel) Noam Okun	(Czech Republic) David Škoch (Czech Republic) Martin Štěpánek	6–4, 7–5
Loss	15–13	Oct 2005	Tulsa, United States	Challenger	Hard	(South Africa) Rik de Voest	(United States) Scott Lipsky (United States) David Martin	0–6, 2–6
Loss	15–14	May 2006	Atlanta, United States	Challenger	Clay	(Israel) Dudi Sela	(United States) Hugo Armando (Brazil) André Sá	4–6, 4–6
Win	16–14	Jun 2006	Milan, Italy	Challenger	Clay	(Italy) Giorgio Galimberti	(Portugal) Fred Gil (Spain) Juan Albert Viloca	6–3, 6–3
Win	17–14	Aug 2006	Bronx, United States	Challenger	Hard	(United Kingdom) Martin Lee	(United States) Scott Lipsky (United States) David Martin	6–4, 7–5
Loss	17–15	Oct 2006	Calabasas, United States	Challenger	Hard	(United States) Sam Warburg	(United States) Robert Kendrick (Philippines) Cecil Mamiit	7–5, 4–6, [5–10]
Win	18–15	Apr 2007	Valencia, United States	Challenger	Hard	(United States) Sam Warburg	(Philippines) Eric Taino (Philippines) Cecil Mamiit	6–2, 6–4
Win	19–15	Jun 2007	Yuba City, United States	Challenger	Hard	(United States) Sam Warburg	(United States) Eric Nunez (Netherlands Antilles) Jean-Julien Rojer	6–4, 6–4
Win	20–15	Nov 2007	Champaign-Urbana, United States	Challenger	Hard	(United States) Sam Warburg	(United States) Scott Lipsky (United States) Brendan Evans	6–4, 6–0
Win	21–15	Nov 2007	Knoxville, United States	Challenger	Hard	(United States) Sam Warburg	(United Kingdom) Jamie Baker (United States) Brendan Evans	3–6, 6–2, [10–6]
Win	22–15	Dec 2007	Israel F5, Ramat HaSharon	Futures	Hard	(Israel) Amir Hadad	(Belarus) Sergey Betov (Ukraine) Denys Molchanov	6–7^{(7–9)}, 6–4, [10–3]
Win	23–15	Apr 2008	Bermuda, Bermuda	Challenger	Clay	(United States) Jim Thomas	(South Africa) Chris Haggard (Australia) Peter Luczak	6–7^{(4–7)}, 6–4, [11–9]
Win	24–15	May 2008	San Remo, Italy	Challenger	Clay	(United States) Jim Thomas	(Germany) Matthias Bachinger (Germany) Daniel Brands	6–4, 6–4
Loss	24–16	Jun 2008	Surbiton, United Kingdom	Challenger	Grass	(United States) Jim Thomas	(France) Arnaud Clément (France) Édouard Roger-Vasselin	6–7^{(4–7)}, 7–6^{(7–3)}, [7–10]
Loss	24–17	Sep 2008	Donetsk, Ukraine	Challenger	Hard	(Israel) Noam Okun	(Belgium) Xavier Malisse (Belgium) Dick Norman	6–4, 1–6, [11–13]
Win	25–17	Feb 2009	Israel F2, Eilat	Futures	Hard	(Israel) Noam Okun	(Netherlands) Tim Van Terheijden (Estonia) Jürgen Zopp	6–3, 6–0
Win	26–17	May 2009	Izmir, Turkey	Challenger	Hard	(Israel) Jonathan Erlich	(India) Prakash Amritraj (United States) Rajeev Ram	6–3, 6–3
Loss	26–18	Jul 2009	Lexington, United States	Challenger	Hard	(Israel) Amir Hadad	(South Africa) Kevin Anderson (United States) Ryler Deheart	4–6, 6–4, [6–10]
Loss	26–19	Aug 2009	Granby, Canada	Challenger	Hard	(Israel) Amir Hadad	(United Kingdom) Colin Fleming (United Kingdom) Ken Skupski	3–6, 6–7^{(6–8)}
Loss	26–20	Sep 2009	Genoa, Italy	Challenger	Clay	(Israel) Amir Hadad	(Italy) Daniele Bracciali (Italy) Alessandro Motti	4–6, 2–6
Loss	26–21	Oct 2015	Israel F14, Ramat HaSharon	Futures	Hard	(Israel) Noam Okun	(Hungary) Gabor Borsos (Hungary) Ádám Kellner	4–6, 6–7^{(7–9)}

== Performance timelines ==
Key
W	F	SF	QF	#R	RR	Q#	DNQ	A	NH

(W) winner; (F) finalist; (SF) semifinalist; (QF) quarterfinalist; (#R) rounds 4, 3, 2, 1; (RR) round-robin stage; (Q#) qualification round; (DNQ) did not qualify; (A) absent; (NH) not held; (SR) strike rate (events won / competed); (W–L) win–loss record.

=== Singles ===
Tournament	1998	1999	2000	2001	2002	2003	2004	2005	2006	2007	2008	2009	2010	SR	W–L	Win %
Grand Slam tournaments
Australian Open	A	Q1	A	2R	A	Q1	Q2	Q2	1R	Q1	1R	A	Q1	0 / 3	1–3	25%
French Open	A	A	1R	2R	1R	Q1	1R	A	Q2	Q2	Q1	A	Q2	0 / 4	1–4	20%
Wimbledon	Q1	A	2R	1R	1R	Q3	Q1	Q1	A	Q2	Q1	Q2	A	0 / 3	1–3	25%
US Open	Q3	Q1	1R	1R	2R	Q1	Q1	Q2	Q3	Q2	Q2	Q2	Q2	0 / 3	1–3	25%
Win–loss	0–0	0–0	1–3	2–4	1–3	0–0	0–1	0–0	0–1	0–0	0–1	0–0	0–0	0 / 13	4–13	24%
ATP Tour Masters 1000
Indian Wells Masters	A	A	A	A	A	A	2R	A	Q1	A	Q1	A	A	0 / 1	1–1	50%
Miami Open	A	A	Q1	1R	A	A	Q2	A	Q1	A	Q2	A	Q2	0 / 1	0–1	0%
Monte-Carlo Masters	A	A	A	1R	A	A	A	A	A	A	A	A	A	0 / 1	0–1	0%
Italian Open	A	A	A	QF	Q1	A	A	A	A	A	A	A	A	0 / 1	3–1	75%
Hamburg Open	A	A	A	2R	A	A	A	A	A	A	Not Masters			0 / 1	1–1	50%
Canadian Open	A	A	F	1R	Q2	Q2	Q2	A	A	A	A	A	A	0 / 2	4–2	67%
Cincinnati Masters	A	A	2R	1R	Q1	Q1	Q2	A	A	A	A	A	A	0 / 2	1–2	33%
Shanghai Masters	Not Held											A	Q1	0 / 0	0–0	–
Paris Masters	A	A	2R	A	A	A	A	A	A	A	A	A	A	0 / 1	0–1	0%
Win–loss	0–0	0–0	5–3	4–6	0–0	0–0	1–1	0–0	0–0	0–0	0–0	0–0	0–0	0 / 10	10–10	50%

=== Doubles ===
Tournament	1998	1999	2000	2001	2002	2003	2004	2005	2006	2007	2008	2009	SR	W–L	Win %
Grand Slam tournaments
Australian Open	A	A	A	1R	A	A	1R	2R	A	A	1R	A	0 / 4	1–4	20%
French Open	A	A	A	A	A	A	1R	A	2R	A	1R	A	0 / 3	1–3	25%
Wimbledon	Q1	A	A	2R	A	A	A	A	A	QF	A	Q1	0 / 2	4–2	67%
US Open	A	Q1	A	1R	A	A	A	A	A	1R	1R	A	0 / 3	0–3	0%
Win–loss	0–0	0–0	0–0	1–3	0–0	0–0	0–2	1–1	1–1	3–2	0–3	0–0	0 / 12	6–12	33%
ATP Tour Masters 1000
Monte Carlo	A	A	A	Q1	A	A	A	A	A	A	A	A	0 / 0	0–0	–
Canada Masters	A	A	1R	A	A	A	A	A	A	A	A	A	0 / 1	0–1	0%
Paris Masters	A	A	Q1	A	A	A	A	A	A	A	A	A	0 / 0	0–0	–
Win–loss	0–0	0–0	0–1	0–0	0–0	0–0	0–0	0–0	0–0	0–0	0–0	0–0	0 / 1	0–1	0%

== See also ==
- List of select Jewish tennis players
