= James Davidson (tennis) =

British tennis player

- Full name: James Davidson
- Country (sports): Great Britain
- Born: 16 September 1973 (age 52)
- Prize money: $34,863

Singles
- Highest ranking: No. 597 (28 August 1995)

Doubles
- Career record: 0–3
- Highest ranking: No. 279 (2 April 2001)

Grand Slam doubles results
- Wimbledon: 1R (2000)

Grand Slam mixed doubles results
- Wimbledon: 1R (2001)

James Davidson (born 16 September 1973) is a British former professional tennis player.

== Biography ==
Davidson played in the doubles main draws of two ATP Tour tournaments, the 1999 Bournemouth International and 2000 Brighton International.

At the age of 26 he made his first main draw at Wimbledon in 2000, as a wildcard pairing with Oliver Freelove. They were beaten in their first round match in four sets by Paul Kilderry and Alberto Martín.

He partnered with Victoria Davies at the 2001 Wimbledon Championships. The wildcard pair won a long second set tiebreak 10–8 but went down in the third, to Julien Boutter and Nathalie Dechy.

A former coach of Aljaž Bedene, he has been coaching London based Frenchman Jérémy Chardy since 2018.
