= 2000 Brighton International =

- Date: November 20–26
- Edition: 5th
- Category: International Series
- Location: Brighton, United Kingdom

Champions

Singles
- (United Kingdom) Tim Henman

Doubles
- (Australia) Michael Hill / (United States) Jeff Tarango
← 1999 ·	Brighton International

The 2000 Brighton International (also known as the 2000 Samsung Open for sponsorship reasons) was a men's tennis tournament played on indoor hard court in Brighton, United Kingdom the event was an International Series event which was part of the 2000 ATP Tour. The tournament was held from November 20 to 26.

== Champions ==
=== Singles ===
(United Kingdom) Tim Henman defeated (Slovakia) Dominik Hrbatý, 6–2, 6–2.

=== Doubles ===
(Australia) Michael Hill / (United States) Jeff Tarango defeated (United States) Paul Goldstein / (United States) Jim Thomas, 6–3, 7–5.
