= 1999 ITF Men's Circuit =

Details

Achievements (singles)

The 1999 ITF Men's Circuit was the 1999 edition of the third-tier tour for men's professional tennis. It was organised by the International Tennis Federation and is a tier below the ATP Challenger Tour. The ITF Men's Circuit included satellite events and 228 'Futures' tournaments played year round across six continents, with prize money ranging from $10,000 to $15,000.

== Futures events ==
$15,000 tournaments
$10,000 tournaments

=== January ===
Tournament	Date	City	Surface	Singles champions	Doubles champions
USA F1 Futures $15,000	January 4	Altamonte Springs; USA	Hard	(United States) James Blake	(United States) Bob Bryan (United States) Mike Bryan
India F1 Futures $10,000	January 11	Chandigarh; India	Grass	(Israel) Amir Hadad	(Israel) Jonathan Erlich (Israel) Amir Hadad
USA F2 Futures $15,000	January 11	Miami; USA	Hard	(United States) Bob Bryan	(United States) Bob Bryan (United States) Mike Bryan
India F2 Futures $10,000	January 18	Ahmedabad; India	Hard	(Slovakia) Boris Borgula	(United States) Todd Meringoff (United States) Andrew Rueb
India F3 Futures $10,000	January 25	Bombay; India	Hard	(Thailand) Paradorn Srichaphan	(Sweden) Simon Aspelin (Sweden) Johan Landsberg

=== February ===
Tournament	Date	City	Surface	Singles champions	Doubles champions
Great Britain F1 Futures $15,000	February 3	Leeds; Great Britain	Carpet (i)	(Germany) Alexander Popp	(Czech Republic) Leoš Friedl (Slovenia) Borut Urh
Great Britain F2 Futures $15,000	February 10	Chigwell; Great Britain	Carpet (i)	(Austria) Julian Knowle	(Czech Republic) Leoš Friedl (Slovenia) Borut Urh
Croatia F1 Futures $15,000	February 15	Zagreb; Croatia	Hard	(Croatia) Ivan Ljubičić	(Israel) Jonathan Erlich (Israel) Nir Welgreen
Great Britain F3 Futures $15,000	February 17	Eastbourne; Great Britain	Carpet (i)	(Germany) Jan Boruszewski	(United Kingdom) James Davidson (United Kingdom) Kyle Spencer
Croatia F2 Futures $15,000	February 22	Zagreb; Croatia	Hard	(Croatia) Ivan Ljubičić	(Czech Republic) Ota Fukárek (Israel) Nir Welgreen

=== March ===
Tournament	Date	City	Surface	Singles champions	Doubles champions
Philippines F1 Futures $15,000	March 1	Manila; Philippines	Hard	(Sweden) Jan Hermansson	(Germany) Marcus Hilpert (United States) Andrew Rueb
Israel F1 Futures $15,000	March 8	Tel Aviv; Israel	Hard	(Sweden) Kalle Flygt	(United Kingdom) James Davidson (Netherlands) Marc Merry
Philippines F2 Futures $15,000	March 8	Manila; Philippines	Hard	(Sweden) Jan Hermansson	(Germany) Marcus Hilpert (United States) Andrew Rueb
France F1 Futures $15,000	March 15	Douai; France	Carpet (i)	(France) Lionel Roux	(France) Jérôme Hanquez (France) Régis Lavergne
Israel F2 Futures $15,000	March 15	Ashkelon; Israel	Hard	(Israel) Noam Behr	(Israel) Eyal Erlich (Israel) Jonathan Erlich
Italy F1 Futures $15,000	March 15	Sassari; Italy	Clay	(Belgium) Kris Goossens	(Italy) Igor Gaudi (Italy) Filippo Messori
Japan F1 Futures $15,000	March 17	Isawa; Japan	Clay	(South Korea) Lee Hyung-taik	(United States) Kevin Kim (South Korea) Lee Hyung-taik
France F2 Futures $15,000	March 22	Poitiers; France	Carpet (i)	(Czech Republic) Radomír Vašek	(Austria) Julian Knowle (Switzerland) Lorenzo Manta
Italy F2 Futures $15,000	March 22	Cagliari; Italy	Clay	(Italy) Igor Gaudi	(Italy) Igor Gaudi (Italy) Filippo Messori
Japan F2 Futures $15,000	March 24	Shirako; Japan	Carpet	(Japan) Yaoki Ishii	(Japan) Yaoki Ishii (Japan) Mitsuru Takada
France F3 Futures $15,000	March 29	Melun; France	Carpet (i)	(Netherlands) Martin Verkerk	(North Macedonia) Aleksandar Kitinov (Austria) Gerald Mandl

=== April ===
Tournament	Date	City	Surface	Singles champions	Doubles champions
France F4 Futures $10,000	April 5	Clermont-Ferrand; France	Carpet (i)	(Germany) Alexander Popp	(Belgium) Gilles Elseneer (Austria) Gerald Mandl
New Zealand F1 Futures $10,000	April 7	Tauranga; New Zealand	Hard	(Greece) Anastasios Vasiliadis	(Australia) Luke Bourgeois (Australia) Dejan Petrović
Uzbekistan F1 Futures $15,000	April 12	Andijan; Uzbekistan	Hard	(Russia) Andrei Stoliarov	(Sweden) Simon Aspelin (Sweden) Johan Landsberg
France F5 Futures $10,000	April 12	Saint-Brieuc; France	Clay (i)	(Belgium) Réginald Willems	(Israel) Amir Hadad (France) Régis Lavergne
Italy F3 Futures $10,000	April 12	Rome; Italy	Clay	(Italy) Pietro Angelini	(France) Maxime Boyé (France) Nicolas Kischkewitz
New Zealand F2 Futures $10,000	April 14	Timaru; New Zealand	Hard	(Australia) James Sekulov	(Australia) Luke Bourgeois (Australia) Dejan Petrović
Uzbekistan F2 Futures $15,000	April 19	Namangan; Uzbekistan	Hard	(Uzbekistan) Oleg Ogorodov	(Sweden) Simon Aspelin (Sweden) Johan Landsberg
Argentina F1 Futures $10,000	April 19	Córdoba; Argentina	Clay	(Argentina) Damián Furmanski	(Argentina) Damián Furmanski (Brazil) Alexandre Simoni
Italy F4 Futures $10,000	April 20	Frascati; Italy	Clay	(Romania) Ionuț Moldovan	(Argentina) Daniel Caracciolo (Argentina) Diego Palmeiro
Great Britain F4 Futures $15,000	April 21	Hatfield; Great Britain	Clay	(Sweden) Patrik Fredriksson	(France) Guillaume Marx (Israel) Kobi Ziv
Indonesia F1 Futures $15,000	April 21	Jakarta; Indonesia	Hard	(Austria) Julian Knowle	(Indonesia) Bonit Wiryawan (Indonesia) Sulistyo Wibowo
New Zealand F3 Futures $10,000	April 21	Christchurch; New Zealand	Hard	(South Africa) Louis Vosloo	(United States) Wynn Criswell (South Africa) Shaun Rudman
Italy F5 Futures $10,000	April 26	Rome; Italy	Clay	(Italy) Elia Grossi	(Italy) Giorgio Galimberti (Italy) Filippo Messori
Argentina F2 Futures $10,000	April 26	Córdoba; Argentina	Clay	(Argentina) Marcelo Charpentier	(Argentina) Guillermo Coria (Argentina) David Nalbandian
Indonesia F2 Futures $15,000	April 28	Jakarta; Indonesia	Hard	(Australia) James Sekulov	(Indonesia) Bonit Wiryawan (Indonesia) Sulistyo Wibowo
Great Britain F5 Futures $15,000	April 28	Hatfield; Great Britain	Clay	(Monaco) Jean-René Lisnard	(United Kingdom) Simon Dickson (United Kingdom) Danny Sapsford

=== May ===
Tournament	Date	City	Surface	Singles champions	Doubles champions
China F1 Futures $15,000	May 3	Beijing; China, P.R.	Hard	(South Korea) Lee Hyung-taik	(Austria) Zbynek Mlynarik (Australia) Steven Randjelovic
Italy F6 Futures $10,000	May 3	Viterbo; Italy	Clay	(Italy) Fabio Maggi	(Italy) Daniele Bracciali (Italy) Filippo Messori
Argentina F3 Futures $10,000	May 3	Córdoba; Argentina	Clay	(Argentina) Agustín Garizzio	(Argentina) Ignacio González King (Brazil) Alexandre Simoni
Germany F1 Futures $15,000	May 5	Esslingen; Germany	Clay	(France) Sébastien de Chaunac	(Germany) Franz Stauder (Germany) Patrick Sommer
Great Britain F6 Futures $15,000	May 5	Newcastle; Great Britain	Clay	(United Kingdom) Luke Milligan	(Australia) Ben Ellwood (United Kingdom) Miles Maclagan
Yugoslavia F1 Futures $10,000	May 10	Belgrade; Yugoslavia	Clay		
USA F3 Futures $15,000	May 10	Tallahassee; USA	Clay	(Canada) Bobby Kokavec	(United States) Rob Givone (United States) Glenn Weiner
Great Britain F7 Futures $15,000	May 10	Edinburgh; Great Britain	Clay	(Sweden) Patrik Fredriksson	(Australia) Ben Ellwood (United Kingdom) Miles Maclagan
China F2 Futures $15,000	May 10	Shenyang; China, P.R.	Hard	(South Korea) Lee Hyung-taik	(Australia) Ashley Ford (France) Anthony La Porte
Chile F1 Futures $10,000	May 10	Coquimbo; Chile	Clay	(Brazil) Alexandre Simoni	(Brazil) Leandro Rosa (Brazil) Alexandre Simoni
Greece F1 Futures $10,000	May 10	Arta; Greece	Hard	(Greece) Nikos Rovas	(Sweden) Simon Aspelin (Sweden) Jan Hermansson
Italy F7 Futures $10,000	May 11	Verona; Italy	Clay	(Netherlands) Melvyn op der Heijde	(Italy) Massimo Ardinghi (Italy) Filippo Messori
Japan F3 Futures $15,000	May 12	Fukuoka; Japan	Hard	(Japan) Satoshi Iwabuchi	(Chinese Taipei) Chen Wei-ju (South Korea) Kwon Oh-hee
Germany F2 Futures $15,000	May 12	Schwäbisch Hall; Germany	Clay	(Poland) Bartłomiej Dąbrowski	(Uzbekistan) Oleg Ogorodov (Belarus) Vladimir Voltchkov
USA F4 Futures $15,000	May 17	Vero Beach; USA	Clay	(United States) Michael Russell	(Georgia (country)) Irakli Labadze (Croatia) Lovro Zovko
Yugoslavia F2 Futures $10,000	May 17	Belgrade; Yugoslavia	Clay		
Greece F2 Futures $10,000	May 17	Filippiada; Greece	Hard	(Sweden) Jan Hermansson	(Germany) Jan-Ralph Brandt (Germany) Markus Menzler
Japan F4 Futures $15,000	May 17	Fukuoka; Japan	Hard	(Japan) Satoshi Iwabuchi	(Japan) Satoshi Iwabuchi (Japan) Mitsuru Takada
Korea F1 Futures $15,000	May 17	Seoul; Korea, Rep.	Clay	(Australia) Steven Randjelovic	(South Korea) Chung Hee-sung (South Korea) Chung Hee-seok
Italy F8 Futures $10,000	May 17	Forlì; Italy	Clay	(Italy) Florian Allgauer	(Italy) Enzo Artoni (Argentina) Sebastian Weisz
Chile F2 Futures $10,000	May 17	Antofagasta; Chile	Clay	(Paraguay) Paulo Carvallo	(Paraguay) Paulo Carvallo (Colombia) Miguel Tobón
Germany F3 Futures $15,000	May 19	Neckarau; Germany	Clay	(Germany) Alexander Popp	(Japan) Thomas Shimada (South Africa) Myles Wakefield
Greece F3 Futures $10,000	May 24	Ioannina; Greece	Hard	(Greece) Anastasios Vasiliadis	(Germany) Jan-Ralph Brandt (Germany) Markus Menzler
Korea F2 Futures $15,000	May 24	Seoul; Korea, Rep.	Clay	(South Korea) Baek Seung-bok	(South Korea) Kim Dong-hyun (South Korea) Lee Hyung-taik
Mexico F1 Futures $10,000	May 24	Campeche; Mexico	Hard	(France) Cedric Kauffmann	(France) Cedric Kauffmann (United States) Mike Mather
Chile F3 Futures $10,000	May 24	Santiago; Chile	Clay	(Paraguay) Paulo Carvallo	(Paraguay) Paulo Carvallo (Colombia) Miguel Tobón
Yugoslavia F3 Futures $10,000	May 24	Belgrade; Yugoslavia	Clay		
USA F5 Futures $15,000	May 24	Boca Raton; USA	Clay	(Austria) Horst Skoff	(United States) Kevin Kim (Venezuela) Yohny Romero
Italy F9 Futures $10,000	May 25	Ladispoli; Italy	Clay	(France) Guillaume Marx	(France) Nicolas Kischkewitz (Italy) Stefano Tarallo
Germany F4 Futures $10,000	May 26	Villingen; Germany	Clay	(Croatia) Željko Krajan	(Netherlands) Martijn Belgraver (Netherlands) Melle van Gemerden
USA F6 Futures $15,000	May 31	Weston; USA	Clay	(United States) Michael Russell	(United States) Michael Jessup (Australia) Lee Pearson
Germany F4B Futures $15,000	May 31	Riemerling; Germany	Clay	(Croatia) Željko Krajan	(Mexico) Enrique Abaroa (Argentina) Damián Furmanski
Ireland F1 Futures $15,000	May 31	Dublin; Ireland	Carpet	(United Kingdom) Luke Milligan	(Italy) Daniele Bracciali (Italy) Igor Gaudi
Italy F10 Futures $10,000	May 31	Pavia; Italy	Clay	(Israel) Harel Levy	(Hungary) Gergely Kisgyörgy (Australia) Dejan Petrović
Mexico F2 Futures $10,000	May 31	Mérida; Mexico	Hard	(France) Cedric Kauffmann	(United States) Wynn Criswell (United States) Javier Gutiérrez
Bulgaria F1 Futures $10,000	May 31	Sofia; Bulgaria	Clay		

=== June ===
Tournament	Date	City	Surface	Singles champions	Doubles champions
Finland F1 Futures $10,000	June 7	Oulu; Finland	Clay	(Sweden) Johan Örtegren	(Sweden) Mikael Maatta (Sweden) Björn Rehnquist
Mexico F3 Futures $10,000	June 7	Cancún; Mexico	Hard	(Cuba) Lázaro Navarro	(Cuba) Lázaro Navarro (Cuba) Juan Pino
Macedonia F1 Futures $10,000	June 7	Skopje; Macedonia	Clay		
Poland F1 Futures $15,000	June 7	Kraków; Poland	Clay	(Israel) Noam Okun	(Mexico) Enrique Abaroa (Czech Republic) Pavel Kudrnáč
Italy F11 Futures $10,000	June 7	Valdengo; Italy	Clay	(Greece) Vasilis Mazarakis	(Spain) Javier García-Sintes (Spain) Carlos Martinez-Comet
Ireland F2 Futures $15,000	June 7	Dublin; Ireland	Carpet	(Israel) Nir Welgreen	(Italy) Daniele Bracciali (Italy) Igor Gaudi
Germany F5 Futures $15,000	June 7	Augsburg; Germany	Clay	(Netherlands) Martin Verkerk	(Germany) Björn Phau (Germany) Lars Uebel
Ukraine F2 Futures $10,000	June 12	Donetsk; Ukraine	Clay		
Yugoslavia F4 Futures $10,000	June 12	Niš; Yugoslavia	Clay		
USA F7 Futures $15,000	June 14	Berkeley; USA	Hard	(France) Thomas Dupré	(South Africa) Gareth Williams (South Africa) Haydn Wakefield
Germany F6 Futures $15,000	June 14	Trier; Germany	Clay	(Netherlands) Martin Verkerk	(Argentina) Federico Browne (Sweden) Johan Landsberg
Italy F12 Futures $10,000	June 14	Turin; Italy	Clay	(Argentina) David Nalbandian	(Argentina) Guillermo Coria (Argentina) David Nalbandian
Poland F2 Futures $15,000	June 14	Zabrze; Poland	Clay	(Poland) Bartłomiej Dąbrowski	(Czech Republic) Petr Dezort (Czech Republic) Pavel Kudrnáč
Hungary F1 Futures $10,000	June 14	Budapest; Hungary	Clay	(Argentina) Carlos Gómez-Díaz	(Slovakia) Martin Hromec (Slovakia) Vladimír Pláteník
Mexico F4 Futures $10,000	June 14	Guadalajara; Mexico	Hard	(Mexico) Luis Herrera	(Mexico) Federico Contreras (Mexico) Jorge Lozano
Finland F2 Futures $10,000	June 14	Helsinki; Finland	Clay	(Sweden) Johan Settergren	(Brazil) Daniel Melo (Brazil) Antonio Prieto
Canada F1 Futures $10,000	June 14	Toronto; Canada	Hard	(South Africa) Louis Vosloo	(Australia) Paul Hanley (Australia) Nathan Healey
USA F8 Futures $15,000	June 21	Danville; USA	Hard	(France) Thomas Dupré	(United States) Brandon Hawk (United States) Doug Root
Yugoslavia F5 Futures $10,000	June 21	Zaječar; Yugoslavia	Clay		
Ukraine F3 Futures $10,000	June 21	Kyiv; Ukraine	Clay		
Canada F2 Futures $10,000	June 21	Montreal; Canada	Hard	(United States) James Blake	(Germany) Jan Boruszewski (Germany) Markus Menzler
Finland F3 Futures $10,000	June 21	Vierumäki; Finland	Clay	(Sweden) Marcus Sarstrand	(France) Stéphane Matheu (Belgium) Olivier Rochus
Hungary F2 Futures $10,000	June 21	Budapest; Hungary	Clay	(France) Olivier Malcor	(France) Maxime Boyé (France) Olivier Malcor
Poland F3 Futures $15,000	June 21	Szamotuły; Poland	Clay		
Hungary F3 Futures $10,000	June 28	Budapest; Hungary	Clay	(Slovakia) Roman Smotlak	(Hungary) Gergely Kisgyörgy (Hungary) Peter Madarassy
Indonesia F3 Futures $15,000	June 28	Jakarta; Indonesia	Hard	(Russia) Vadim Kutsenko	(Indonesia) Bonit Wiryawan (Indonesia) Sulistyo Wibowo
Greece F4 Futures $15,000	June 28	Alexandroupoli; Greece	Carpet	(Greece) Konstantinos Economidis	(Bulgaria) Ivaylo Traykov (Bulgaria) Milen Velev
Canada F3 Futures $10,000	June 28	Montreal; Canada	Hard	(Canada) Simon Larose	(United States) Jeff Laski (Canada) Jerry Turek
USA F9 Futures $15,000	June 28	Redding; USA	Hard	(United States) Taylor Dent	(United States) Brandon Hawk (United States) Doug Root

=== July ===
Tournament	Date	City	Surface	Singles champions	Doubles champions
Austria F1 Futures $10,000	July 5	Salzburg; Austria	Clay	(Slovakia) Roman Smotlak	(Croatia) Goran Orešić (Italy) Uros Vico
Spain F1 Futures $15,000	July 5	Elche; Spain	Clay	(Spain) Albert Montañés	(Australia) Tim Crichton (Australia) Todd Perry
France F6 Futures $10,000	July 5	Bourg-en-Bresse; France	Clay	(France) Julien Cuaz	(France) Maxime Boyé (France) Jean-Michel Pequery
Greece F5 Futures $15,000	July 5	Thessaloniki; Greece	Clay	(Bulgaria) Milen Velev	(Slovakia) Martin Hromec (Slovakia) Vladimír Pláteník
Indonesia F4 Futures $15,000	July 5	Jakarta; Indonesia	Hard	(South Korea) Yoon Yong-il	(Indonesia) Andrian Raturandang (South Korea) Yoon Yong-il
USA F10 Futures $15,000	July 5	Chico; USA	Hard	(United States) Brandon Hawk	(United States) Jason Cook (United States) Jeff Morrison
Turkey F1 Futures $10,000	July 5	Istanbul; Turkey	Hard	(Israel) Lior Dahan	(Australia) Jordan Kerr (Australia) Toby Mitchell
Germany F7 Futures $15,000	July 12	Kassel; Germany	Clay	(Czech Republic) David Škoch	(Kazakhstan) Yuri Schukin (Germany) Andreas Tattermusch
France F7 Futures $10,000	July 12	Aix-en-Provence; France	Clay	(United States) Hugo Armando	(France) Maxime Boyé (France) Julien Varlet
Spain F2 Futures $15,000	July 12	Alicante; Spain	Clay	(Spain) Antonio Navarro	(Mexico) Enrique Abaroa (Australia) Ashley Fisher
Austria F2 Futures $10,000	July 12	Telfs; Austria	Clay	(Austria) Konstantin Gruber	(Austria) Gerald Mandl (Austria) Thomas Strengberger
Turkey F2 Futures $10,000	July 12	Istanbul; Turkey	Hard	(Israel) Eyal Erlich	(Pakistan) Aisam-ul-Haq Qureshi (Uzbekistan) Dmitri Tomashevich
Slovenia F1 Futures $10,000	July 12	Kranj; Slovenia	Clay	(Czech Republic) Jan Hernych	(Czech Republic) Leoš Friedl (Czech Republic) Petr Kovačka
Austria F3 Futures $10,000	July 19	Schwaz; Austria	Clay	(Austria) Werner Eschauer	(Argentina) Daniel Caracciolo (Argentina) Fernando Las Heras
Spain F3 Futures $10,000	July 19	Dénia; Spain	Clay	(Greece) Solon Peppas	(Spain) Óscar Hernández (France) Julien Jeanpierre
France F8 Futures $10,000	July 19	Aix-les-Bains; France	Clay	(Algeria) Slimane Saoudi	(France) Julien Cassaigne (France) Nicolas Mahut
Germany F8 Futures $10,000	July 19	Zell; Germany	Clay	(Germany) Alexander Waske	(Australia) Stephen Huss (Australia) Lee Pearson
Slovenia F2 Futures $10,000	July 19	Portorož; Slovenia	Clay	(Italy) Uros Vico	(Czech Republic) Leoš Friedl (Czech Republic) Petr Kovačka
Turkey F3 Futures $10,000	July 19	Istanbul; Turkey	Hard	(Israel) Andy Ram	(Pakistan) Aisam-ul-Haq Qureshi (Uzbekistan) Dmitri Tomashevich
USA F11 Futures $15,000	July 19	Godfrey; USA	Hard	(South Africa) Louis Vosloo	(Australia) Paul Hanley (Australia) Nathan Healey
Uruguay F1 Futures $15,000	July 19	Montevideo; Uruguay	Clay	(Argentina) Walter Grinovero	(Brazil) Pedro Braga (Brazil) Leonardo Silva
Uruguay F2 Futures $15,000	July 26	José Ignacio; Uruguay	Clay	(Brazil) Ricardo Mello	(Argentina) Sergio Roitman (Argentina) Andrés Zingman
USA F12 Futures $15,000	July 26	St. Joseph; USA	Hard	(France) Thomas Dupré	(United States) Cary Franklin (United States) Graydon Oliver
Slovenia F3 Futures $10,000	July 26	Maribor; Slovenia	Clay	(Czech Republic) Jan Vacek	(Slovenia) Marko Dolecek (Slovenia) Borut Martincevic
Italy F14 Futures $10,000	July 26	San Benedetto del Tronto; Italy	Clay	(Italy) Stefano Tarallo	(Italy) Stefan Pircher (Italy) Alessandro Tombolini
Germany F9 Futures $10,000	July 26	Leun; Germany	Clay	(Australia) Lee Pearson	(Australia) Stephen Huss (Australia) Lee Pearson
France F9 Futures $10,000	July 26	Toulon; France	Clay	(France) Olivier Patience	(France) Julien Cuaz (France) Olivier Patience
Spain F4 Futures $10,000	July 26	Gandia; Spain	Clay	(Spain) Manuel Sala	(Australia) Tim Crichton (Australia) Todd Perry
Egypt F1 Futures $10,000	July 26	Cairo; Egypt	Clay	(Morocco) Mounir El Aarej	(Australia) Darin Currall (Australia) Glenn Knox

=== August ===
Tournament	Date	City	Surface	Singles champions	Doubles champions
USA F13 Futures $15,000	August 2	Decatur; USA	Hard	(Germany) Björn Phau	(South Africa) Gareth Williams (United States) Jeff Williams
Egypt F2 Futures $10,000	August 2	Cairo; Egypt	Clay	(Czech Republic) František Čermák	(Austria) Ronald Dueller (Austria) Thiemo Maier
Spain F5 Futures $10,000	August 2	Xàtiva; Spain	Clay	(Spain) Óscar Hernández	(Australia) Tim Crichton (Australia) Todd Perry
Estonia F1 Futures $10,000	August 2	Pärnu; Estonia	Clay	(Sweden) Nicklas Timfjord	(Finland) Lassi Ketola (Finland) Tero Vilen
Italy F15 Futures $10,000	August 2	Iesi; Italy	Clay	(Romania) Ionuț Moldovan	(Argentina) Daniel Caracciolo (Argentina) Fernando Las Heras
Italy F16 Futures $10,000	August 9	Trani; Italy	Clay	(Italy) Riccardo Ciruolo	(Brazil) Rodrigo Monte (Brazil) Otavio Rovati
Latvia F1 Futures $10,000	August 9	Jūrmala; Latvia	Clay	(Poland) Piotr Szczepanik	(Australia) Jordan Kerr (Australia) Michael Logarzo
Egypt F3 Futures $10,000	August 9	Cairo; Egypt	Clay	(Czech Republic) František Čermák	(Czech Republic) František Čermák (Germany) Matthias A Muller
Belgium F1 Futures $15,000	August 9	Jupille-sur-Meuse; Belgium	Clay	(Belgium) Olivier Rochus	(Sweden) Henrik Andersson (Sweden) Johan Settergren
USA F14 Futures $15,000	August 9	Kansas City; USA	Hard	(South Korea) Yoon Yong-il	(South Africa) Gareth Williams (United States) Jeff Williams
Russia F1 Futures $15,000	August 16	Moscow; Russia	Clay		
Belgium F2 Futures $15,000	August 16	Brussels; Belgium	Clay	(Germany) Jan Weinzierl	(Sweden) Henrik Andersson (Sweden) Johan Settergren
Spain F6 Futures $15,000	August 16	Vigo; Spain	Clay	(Spain) Feliciano López	(Spain) Carlos Castellanos (Spain) Javier Perez-Vazquez
Lithuania F1 Futures $10,000	August 16	Vilnius; Lithuania	Clay	(Slovenia) Marko Tkalec	(Australia) Jordan Kerr (Australia) Michael Logarzo
Morocco F1 Futures $10,000	August 16	Tangier; Morocco	Clay	(Spain) Rubén Ramírez Hidalgo	(Australia) Tim Crichton (Australia) Todd Perry
Romania F1 Futures $15,000	August 16	Galați; Romania	Clay	(Romania) Teodor-Dacian Crăciun	(France) Benjamin Cassaigne (France) Michaël Llodra
Ukraine F4 Futures $15,000	August 23	Horlivka; Ukraine	Clay	(France) Olivier Patience	(France) Rodolphe Cadart (France) Olivier Patience
Romania F2 Futures $15,000	August 23	Bacău; Romania	Clay	(Austria) Konstantin Gruber	(Australia) Phillip Harris (Argentina) Cristian Kordasz
Morocco F2 Futures $10,000	August 23	Casablanca; Morocco	Clay	(Spain) Pedro Rico	(United States) Mirko Pehar (Germany) Andreas Weber
Spain F7 Futures $15,000	August 23	Irun; Spain	Clay	(Belgium) Réginald Willems	(Argentina) Andrés Schneiter (Argentina) Marcello Wowk
Belarus F1 Futures $15,000	August 23	Minsk; Belarus	Carpet	(Russia) Mikhail Youzhny	(Turkey) Efe Üstündağ (Israel) Raviv Weidenfeld
Ukraine F5 Futures $15,000	August 30	Horlivka; Ukraine	Clay	(France) Rodolphe Cadart	(Republic of Ireland) Scott Barron (Germany) Andreas Tattermusch
Russia F2 Futures $15,000	August 30	Samara; Russia	Hard	(Russia) Mikhail Youzhny	(Russia) Andrei Youzhny (Russia) Mikhail Youzhny
Peru F1 Futures $10,000	August 30	Arequipa; Peru	Clay	(Chile) Adrián García	(Paraguay) Paulo Carvallo (Cuba) Lázaro Navarro
Spain F8 Futures $15,000	August 30	Santander; Spain	Clay	(Spain) Tommy Robredo	(Andorra) Joan Jimenez-Guerra (Spain) Feliciano López
Morocco F3 Futures $10,000	August 30	Casablanca; Morocco	Clay	(Spain) Rubén Ramírez Hidalgo	(Morocco) Mounir El Aarej (Mauritius) Kamil Patel

=== September ===
Tournament	Date	City	Surface	Singles champions	Doubles champions
Spain F9 Futures $15,000	September 6	Oviedo; Spain	Clay	(Argentina) Andrés Schneiter	(Spain) Carlos Martinez-Comet (Spain) Tommy Robredo
France F10 Futures $15,000	September 6	Bagnères-de-Bigorre; France	Hard	(France) Rodolphe Gilbert	(France) Julien Cuaz (France) Lionel Roux
Peru F2 Futures $10,000	September 6	Lima; Peru	Clay	(Greece) Solon Peppas	(Peru) Iván Miranda (Peru) Américo Venero
Russia F3 Futures $15,000	September 6	Tolyatti; Russia	Hard	(Russia) Igor Kunitsyn	(Turkey) Efe Üstündağ (Israel) Raviv Weidenfeld
Turkey F4 Futures $10,000	September 6	Istanbul; Turkey	Hard		
Turkey F5 Futures $10,000	September 13	Adora; Turkey	Carpet	(Belgium) Timothy Aerts	(Slovenia) Miha Gregorc (Slovenia) Andrej Kračman
Peru F3 Futures $10,000	September 13	Lima; Peru	Clay	(Argentina) Sergio Roitman	(Italy) Enzo Artoni (Argentina) Sergio Roitman
France F11 Futures $15,000	September 13	Mulhouse; France	Hard (i)	(France) Nicolas Thomann	(France) Julien Cuaz (France) Lionel Roux
Norway F1 Futures $10,000	September 13	Oslo; Norway	Carpet (i)	(Sweden) Johan Settergren	(United States) Mitty Arnold (United States) Thomas Blake
Turkey F6 Futures $10,000	September 20	Antalya; Turkey	Clay	(Belgium) Timothy Aerts	(Israel) Amir Hadad (Israel) Andy Ram
Sweden F1 Futures $10,000	September 20	Gothenburg; Sweden	Hard (i)	(Norway) Helge Koll-Frafjord	(Sweden) Robert Lindstedt (Sweden) Fredrik Lovén
Germany F10 Futures $10,000	September 20	Oberhaching; Germany	Carpet (i)	(Czech Republic) Radim Žitko	(Czech Republic) Pavel Kudrnáč (Czech Republic) Petr Kovačka
France F12 Futures $15,000	September 20	Plaisir; France	Hard (i)	(France) Michaël Llodra	(Italy) Stefano Pescosolido (Russia) Andrei Stoliarov
Great Britain F8 Futures $10,000	September 20	Sunderland; Great Britain	Hard (i)	(Belgium) Olivier Rochus	(United Kingdom) Oliver Freelove (United States) Jeff Laski
Bolivia F1 Futures $10,000	September 20	La Paz; Bolivia	Clay	(Colombia) Miguel Tobón	(Brazil) Leandro Rosa (Lebanon) Jicham Zaatini
Sweden F2 Futures $10,000	September 27	Gothenburg; Sweden	Hard (i)	(United States) Mitty Arnold	(United States) Mitty Arnold (United States) Thomas Blake
Bolivia F2 Futures $10,000	September 27	Cochabamba; Bolivia	Clay	(Argentina) Rodrigo Cerdera	(Chile) Jaime Fillol Jr. (Chile) Adrián García
Great Britain F9 Futures $10,000	September 27	Glasgow; Great Britain	Hard (i)	(United Kingdom) Mark Hilton	(New Zealand) Alistair Hunt (United Kingdom) Tom Spinks
France F13 Futures $15,000	September 27	Nevers; France	Hard (i)	(Netherlands) Rogier Wassen	(Austria) Gerald Mandl (Czech Republic) Martin Štěpánek
Germany F11 Futures $10,000	September 27	Offenbach; Germany	Hard (i)	(Slovenia) Andrej Kračman	(Slovenia) Andrej Kračman (Germany) Oliver Maiberger
Italy F17 Futures $15,000	September 27	Sardinia; Italy	Hard	(Italy) Elia Grossi	(Austria) Werner Eschauer (Austria) Wolfgang Schranz

=== October ===
Tournament	Date	City	Surface	Singles champions	Doubles champions
Uzbekistan F3 Futures $10,000	October 4	Guliston; Uzbekistan	Hard	(Belarus) Alexander Shvets	(Belarus) Alexander Shvets (Uzbekistan) Dmitri Tomashevich
Italy F18 Futures $15,000	October 4	Selargius; Italy	Hard	(Italy) Filippo Volandri	(Austria) Werner Eschauer (Austria) Wolfgang Schranz
Indonesia F5 Futures $15,000	October 4	Jakarta; Indonesia	Hard	(Pakistan) Aisam-ul-Haq Qureshi	(Japan) Thomas Shimada (South Africa) Myles Wakefield
Germany F12 Futures $10,000	October 4	Offenbach; Germany	Hard (i)	(Czech Republic) Jan Vacek	(Germany) Bernard Parun (New Zealand) Tony Parun
France F14 Futures $10,000	October 4	Sarreguemines; France	Carpet (i)	(France) Régis Lavergne	(France) Régis Lavergne (France) Jean-Michel Pequery
Great Britain F10 Futures $15,000	October 4	Edinburgh; Great Britain	Hard (i)	(Russia) Mikhail Youzhny	(United Kingdom) James Davidson (Sweden) Fredrik Lovén
Bolivia F3 Futures $10,000	October 4	Santa Cruz; Bolivia	Clay	(Argentina) Rodrigo Cerdera	(Argentina) Walter Grinovero (Argentina) Martín Vassallo Argüello
Great Britain F11 Futures $15,000	October 11	Leeds; Great Britain	Hard (i)	(Russia) Mikhail Youzhny	(Sweden) Björn Rehnquist (Sweden) Nicklas Timfjord
France F15 Futures $10,000	October 11	St. Dizier; France	Hard (i)	(France) Michaël Llodra	(France) Michaël Llodra (France) Jean-Michel Pequery
Indonesia F6 Futures $15,000	October 11	Jakarta; Indonesia	Hard	(Japan) Hideki Kaneko	(Japan) Thomas Shimada (South Africa) Myles Wakefield
Uzbekistan F4 Futures $10,000	October 11	Fergana; Uzbekistan	Hard	(Belarus) Alexander Shvets	(Israel) Lior Dahan (Belgium) Kris Goossens
Paraguay F1 Futures $10,000	October 11	Asunción; Paraguay	Clay	(Argentina) Edgardo Massa	(Argentina) Gustavo Marcaccio (Argentina) Patricio Rudi
Uzbekistan F5 Futures $10,000	October 18	Qarshi; Uzbekistan	Hard	(Belarus) Alexander Shvets	(Italy) Stefano Galvani (Israel) Andy Ram
Paraguay F2 Futures $10,000	October 18	Asunción; Paraguay	Clay	(Argentina) Diego Moyano	(Chile) Jaime Fillol Jr. (Chile) Adrián García
USA F15 Futures $15,000	October 18	Beaumont; USA	Hard	(Finland) Kim Tiilikainen	(United States) Zack Fleishman (United States) Kelly Gullett
Mexico F5 Futures $10,000	October 18	Playa del Carmen; Mexico	Hard	(Venezuela) José de Armas	(Brazil) Leonardo Silva (Brazil) Flávio Saretta
Japan F5 Futures $15,000	October 18	Kobe; Japan	Carpet	(South Korea) Lee Hyung-taik	(Japan) Tasuku Iwami (Japan) Ryuso Tsujino
France F16 Futures $15,000	October 18	La Roche-sur-Yon; France	Hard (i)	(France) Régis Lavergne	(Belgium) David Basile (Belgium) Arnaud Fontaine
Australia F1 Futures $15,000	October 25	Beaumaris; Australia	Clay	(Australia) Ben Ellwood	(Australia) Tim Crichton (Australia) Domenic Marafiote
France F17 Futures $10,000	October 25	Rodez; France	Hard (i)	(France) Jean-Michel Pequery	(United Kingdom) Oliver Freelove (United Kingdom) Tom Spinks
Japan F6 Futures $15,000	October 25	Fukuoka; Japan	Carpet	(Japan) Yaoki Ishii	(Japan) Tasuku Iwami (Japan) Ryuso Tsujino
Mexico F6 Futures $10,000	October 25	Chihuahua; Mexico	Hard	(Greece) Solon Peppas	(Venezuela) José de Armas (Mexico) Daniel Langre
USA F16 Futures $15,000	October 25	Waco; USA	Hard	(United Kingdom) Arvind Parmar	(Canada) Frédéric Niemeyer (Canada) Jerry Turek
Tunisia F1 Futures $15,000	October 25	Tunis; Tunisia	Clay	(Argentina) Cristian Kordasz	(Czech Republic) František Čermák (Czech Republic) Petr Dezort
Paraguay F3 Futures $10,000	October 25	Asunción; Paraguay	Clay	(Brazil) Ricardo Mello	(Italy) Enzo Artoni (Argentina) Sergio Roitman

=== November ===
Tournament	Date	City	Surface	Singles champions	Doubles champions
Thailand F1 Futures $15,000	November 1	Bangkok; Thailand	Hard	(Israel) Eyal Ran	(Israel) Eyal Ran (Uzbekistan) Dmitri Tomashevich
Tunisia F2 Futures $15,000	November 1	Tunis; Tunisia	Clay	(Netherlands) Rogier Wassen	(Finland) Tapio Nurminen (Finland) Janne Ojala
USA F17 Futures $15,000	November 1	Hattiesburg; USA	Hard	(Finland) Kim Tiilikainen	(South Africa) Gareth Williams (United States) Jeff Williams
Mexico F7 Futures $10,000	November 1	León; Mexico	Hard	(Brazil) Flávio Saretta	(Mexico) Marco Osorio (Mexico) Víctor Romero
Greece F6 Futures $15,000	November 1	Heraklion; Greece	Hard	(Spain) Óscar Burrieza	(Croatia) Davor Grgic (Netherlands) Djalmar Sistermans
Australia F2 Futures $15,000	November 1	Frankston; Australia	Clay	(Australia) Dejan Petrović	(Australia) Paul Kilderry (Australia) Grant Silcock
Argentina F4 Futures $15,000	November 1	Rosario; Argentina	Clay	(Argentina) José Acasuso	(Argentina) Guillermo Coria (Argentina) David Nalbandian
USA F18 Futures $15,000	November 8	Lafayette; USA	Hard	(Slovenia) Miha Gregorc	(United States) Zack Fleishman (United States) Kelly Gullett
Thailand F2 Futures $15,000	November 8	Pattaya City; Thailand	Hard	(Thailand) Danai Udomchoke	(Canada) Dave Abelson (Australia) Ashley Fisher
Argentina F5 Futures $15,000	November 8	Lanús; Argentina	Clay	(Argentina) Mariano Delfino	(Brazil) Marcos Daniel (Brazil) Ricardo Schlachter
Cyprus F1 Futures $15,000	November 8	Nicosia; Cyprus	Clay	(Austria) Clemens Trimmel	(Italy) Alessandro Da Col (Federal Republic of Yugoslavia) Jovan Savic
Chile F4 Futures $10,000	November 15	Santiago; Chile	Clay	(Argentina) Diego Moyano	(Italy) Enzo Artoni (Argentina) Andrés Schneiter
Australia F3 Futures $15,000	November 15	Berri; Australia	Grass	(Australia) Ben Ellwood	(Australia) Chris Rae (Australia) Sebastien Swierk
USA F19 Futures $15,000	November 15	Grenelefe; USA	Hard	(United States) James Blake	(Canada) Bobby Kokavec (Canada) Jocelyn Robichaud
Vietnam F1 Futures $10,000	November 15	Ho Chi Minh City; Vietnam	Hard	(Japan) Yaoki Ishii	(New Zealand) Mark Nielsen (Pakistan) Aisam-ul-Haq Qureshi
USA F20 Futures $15,000	November 22	Clearwater; USA	Hard	(United States) James Blake	(United States) Brandon Hawk (Canada) Bobby Kokavec
Australia F4 Futures $15,000	November 22	Barmera; Australia	Grass	(Australia) Sebastien Swierk	(Australia) Paul Hanley (Australia) Nathan Healey
Chile F5 Futures $10,000	November 22	Valparaíso; Chile	Clay	(Italy) Filippo Messori	(Chile) Jaime Fillol Jr. (Chile) Adrián García
Brazil F1 Futures $15,000	November 22	Vitória; Brazil	Clay	(Brazil) Marcos Daniel	(Brazil) Thiago Alves (Brazil) Adriano Ferreira
Bangladesh F1 Futures $15,000	November 22	Rajshahi; Bangladesh	Hard	(South Africa) Donavan September	(Australia) Ashley Fisher (United States) Minh Le
USA F21 Futures $15,000	November 29	Laguna Niguel; USA	Hard	(Austria) Alexander Peya	(South Africa) Gareth Williams (United States) Jeff Williams
Bangladesh F2 Futures $15,000	November 29	Dhaka; Bangladesh	Hard	(Pakistan) Aisam-ul-Haq Qureshi	(Australia) Ashley Fisher (United States) Minh Le
Brazil F2 Futures $15,000	November 29	Niterói; Brazil	Clay	(Croatia) Ivan Beroš	(Brazil) Leandro Rosa (Brazil) Ricardo Schlachter
Chile F6 Futures $10,000	November 29	Santiago; Chile	Clay	(Chile) Adrián García	(Chile) Jaime Fillol Jr. (Chile) Adrián García

=== December ===
Tournament	Date	City	Surface	Singles champions	Doubles champions
USA F22 Futures $15,000	December 6	Phoenix; USA	Hard	(Belgium) Olivier Rochus	(United States) Diego Ayala (United States) Robert Kendrick
