= 1998 ITF Men's Circuit =

Details

Achievements (singles)

The 1998 ITF Men's Circuit was the 1998 edition of the third-tier tour for men's professional tennis. It was organised by the International Tennis Federation and is a tier below the ATP Challenger Tour. The ITF Men's Circuit included satellite events and 212 'Futures' tournaments played year round across six continents, with prize money ranging from $10,000 to $15,000.

== Futures events ==
$15,000 tournaments
$10,000 tournaments

=== January ===
Tournament	Date	City	Surface	Singles champions	Doubles champions
India F2 Futures $10,000	January 5	Chandigarh, India	Grass	(India) Syed Fazaluddin	(Germany) Marcus Hilpert (United States) Todd Meringoff
India F3 Futures $10,000	January 12	Indore, India	Hard	(United States) Andrew Rueb	(Lebanon) Ali Hamadeh (United States) Andrew Rueb

=== February ===
Tournament	Date	City	Surface	Singles champions	Doubles champions
Austria F1 Futures $10,000	February 2	Bergheim, Austria	Carpet (i)	(Slovenia) Borut Urh	(Czech Republic) Leoš Friedl (Czech Republic) Martin Štěpánek
Great Britain F1 Futures $15,000	February 4	Bramhall, Great Britain	Carpet (i)	(Netherlands) Marc Merry	(Sweden) Mathias Hellström (Sweden) Fredrik Lovén
Austria F2 Futures $10,000	February 9	Bergheim, Austria	Carpet (i)	(Bulgaria) Ivaylo Traykov	(Germany) Markus Menzler (Germany) Markus Wislsperger
Ghana F1 Futures $10,000	February 9	Accra, Ghana	Clay	(Italy) Gabrio Castrichella	(France) Nicolas Kischkewitz (United Kingdom) Miles Maclagan
Great Britain F2 Futures $15,000	February 11	Chigwell, Great Britain	Carpet (i)	(Sweden) Fredrik Lovén	(United Kingdom) Barry Cowan (United Kingdom) Tom Spinks
Austria F3 Futures $10,000	February 16	Mondseeland, Austria	Carpet (i)	(Czech Republic) Radek Štěpánek	(Czech Republic) Petr Pála (Slovenia) Borut Urh
Ghana F2 Futures $10,000	February 16	Accra, Ghana	Clay	(Australia) Steven Randjelovic	(Argentina) Carlos Gómez-Díaz (Brazil) Ricardo Schlachter
Great Britain F3 Futures $15,000	February 18	Eastbourne, Great Britain	Carpet (i)	(Sweden) Kalle Flygt	(Sweden) Kalle Flygt (Sweden) Fredrik Lovén
Togo F1 Futures $10,000	February 23	Lomé, Togo	Hard	(Ivory Coast) Claude N'Goran	(Hungary) Peter Madarassy (Australia) Steven Randjelovic
Germany F1 Futures $10,000	February 25	Oberhaching, Germany	Carpet (i)	(Sweden) Johan Settergren	(United Kingdom) Barry Cowan (United Kingdom) Nick Gould

=== March ===
Tournament	Date	City	Surface	Singles champions	Doubles champions
Philippines F1 Futures $15,000	March 2	Manila, Philippines	Hard	(Venezuela) Jimy Szymanski	(Philippines) Cecil Mamiit (Philippines) Eric Taino
Germany F2 Futures $10,000	March 4	Offenbach, Germany	Hard (i)	(Sweden) Marcus Sarstrand	(France) Stéphane Matheu (France) Olivier Morel
Philippines F2 Futures $15,000	March 9	Manila, Philippines	Hard	(Venezuela) Jimy Szymanski	(Chinese Taipei) Chen Chih-jung (South Korea) Lee Hyung-taik
Greece F1 Futures $10,000	March 16	Seròs, Greece	Hard	(Sweden) Patrik Fredriksson	(Sweden) Fredrik Bergh (Sweden) Jan Hermansson
Indonesia F1 Futures $15,000	March 16	Manado, Indonesia	Hard		
Israel F1 Futures $15,000	March 16	Jaffa, Israel	Hard	(Israel) Harel Levy	(Finland) Tapio Nurminen (Finland) Janne Ojala
Japan F1 Futures $15,000	March 16	Ishiwa, Japan	Clay	(Russia) Vadim Kutsenko	(United States) Todd Meringoff (United States) Andrew Rueb
Italy F1 Futures $15,000	March 17	Cagliari, Italy	Clay	(Spain) David Caballero	(Czech Republic) Radek Štěpánek (Czech Republic) Michal Tabara
Greece F2 Futures $10,000	March 23	Kalamata, Greece	Hard	(Sweden) Patrik Fredriksson	(United Kingdom) Nick Gould (United Kingdom) Tom Spinks
Indonesia F2 Futures $15,000	March 23	Ujung Pandang, Indonesia	Hard		
Israel F2 Futures $15,000	March 23	Ashkelon, Israel	Hard	(Belarus) Vladimir Voltchkov	(Israel) Harel Levy (Israel) Lior Mor
Italy F2 Futures $15,000	March 24	Sassari, Italy	Clay	(Finland) Kim Tiilikainen	(Germany) Markus Hantschk (Austria) Johannes Unterberger
Japan F2 Futures $15,000	March 25	Shirako, Japan	Carpet	(Japan) Tetsuya Chaen	(United States) Todd Meringoff (United States) Andrew Rueb
Greece F3 Futures $10,000	March 30	Chalcis, Greece	Hard	(Germany) Jan-Ralph Brandt	(United Kingdom) David Draper (Sweden) Jan Hermansson

=== April ===
Tournament	Date	City	Surface	Singles champions	Doubles champions
Uzbekistan F1 Futures $15,000	April 13	Fergana, Uzbekistan	Hard		
Italy F3 Futures $10,000	April 14	Rome, Italy	Clay	(Argentina) Miguel Pastura	(Argentina) Agustín Calleri (Argentina) Óscar Rodríguez
Argentina F1 Futures $15,000	April 20	Buenos Aires, Argentina	Clay	(Brazil) Ricardo Schlachter	(Brazil) Cristiano Testa (Brazil) João Zwetsch
Germany F3 Futures $15,000	April 20	Riemerling, Germany	Clay	(Germany) Daniel Elsner	(Czech Republic) Tomáš Cibulec (Czech Republic) Petr Kovačka
Italy F4 Futures $10,000	April 20	Unknown, Italy	Clay	(Argentina) Agustín Calleri	(Argentina) Agustín Calleri (Croatia) Igor Šarić
Uzbekistan F2 Futures $15,000	April 20	Andijan, Uzbekistan	Hard	(Belarus) Max Mirnyi	(Belarus) Max Mirnyi (Belarus) Vladimir Voltchkov
Great Britain F4 Futures $15,000	April 22	Bournemouth, Great Britain	Clay	(France) Grégory Carraz	(Australia) Ben Ellwood (Sweden) Kalle Flygt
Argentina F2 Futures $15,000	April 27	Mendoza, Argentina	Clay	(Brazil) Ricardo Schlachter	(Brazil) Cristiano Testa (Brazil) João Zwetsch
Germany F4 Futures $15,000	April 27	Esslingen, Germany	Clay	(Spain) Jordi Mas	(Argentina) Federico Browne (Argentina) Martín García
Italy F5 Futures $10,000	April 27	Frascati, Italy	Clay	(Argentina) Agustín Calleri	(Italy) Giorgio Galimberti (Italy) Massimo Valeri
Uzbekistan F3 Futures $15,000	April 27	Namangan, Uzbekistan	Hard	(Japan) Gouichi Motomura	(Israel) Michael Kogan (Israel) Ofer Sela
Great Britain F5 Futures $15,000	April 29	Hatfield, Great Britain	Clay	(Belgium) Christophe Rochus	(South Africa) Justin Bower (South Africa) Damien Roberts

=== May ===
Tournament	Date	City	Surface	Singles champions	Doubles champions
China F1 Futures $15,000	May 4	Beijing, China, P.R.	Hard	(South Korea) Yoon Yong-il	(South Korea) Kim Dong-hyun (Netherlands) Raemon Sluiter
Germany F5 Futures $15,000	May 4	Schwäbisch Hall, Germany	Clay	(Netherlands) Martijn Belgraver	(Germany) Markus Menzler (Germany) Markus Wislsperger
Great Britain F6 Futures $15,000	May 4	Cardiff, Great Britain	Clay	(France) Rodolphe Cadart	(United Kingdom) Nick Gould (United Kingdom) Tom Spinks
China F2 Futures $15,000	May 11	Tianjin, China, P.R.	Hard	(Japan) Hideki Kaneko	(South Korea) Lee Hyung-taik (South Korea) Yoon Yong-il
Germany F6 Futures $15,000	May 11	Neckarau, Germany	Clay	(Argentina) Agustín Garizzio	(Poland) Bartłomiej Dąbrowski (Australia) Jurek Stasiak
Russia F1 Futures $15,000	May 11	Saratov, Russia	Hard	(Belarus) Max Mirnyi	(Russia) Denis Golovanov (Belarus) Max Mirnyi
USA F1 Futures $15,000	May 11	Delray Beach, USA	Clay	(Haiti) Ronald Agénor	(Sweden) Simon Aspelin (United States) Chris Tontz
Yugoslavia F1 Futures $10,000	May 11	Belgrade, Yugoslavia	Clay	(Czech Republic) Václav Roubíček	(Slovakia) Martin Hromec (Czech Republic) Adolf Musil
Germany F7 Futures $15,000	May 18	Augsburg, Germany	Clay	(Brazil) Ricardo Schlachter	(Germany) Sascha Bandermann (New Zealand) James Greenhalgh
Italy F6 Futures $10,000	May 18	Rome, Italy	Clay	(Italy) Gianluca Gatto	(France) Nicolas Kischkewitz (Italy) Massimo Valeri
Russia F2 Futures $15,000	May 18	Samara, Russia	Hard	(Belarus) Max Mirnyi	(Russia) Denis Golovanov (Belarus) Max Mirnyi
USA F2 Futures $15,000	May 18	Vero Beach, USA	Clay	(Haiti) Ronald Agénor	(Sweden) Simon Aspelin (United States) Chris Tontz
Yugoslavia F2 Futures $10,000	May 18	Belgrade, Yugoslavia	Clay	(Italy) Igor Gaudi	(Federal Republic of Yugoslavia) Nikola Gnjatović (Australia) Dejan Petrović
Germany F8 Futures $10,000	May 25	Schwaigern, Germany	Clay	(France) Olivier Malcor	(Czech Republic) Tomáš Cibulec (Czech Republic) Petr Kovačka
Italy F7 Futures $10,000	May 25	Parma, Italy	Clay	(Italy) Massimo Valeri	(Italy) Giorgio Galimberti (Italy) Massimo Valeri
Korea F1 Futures $15,000	May 25	Seogwipo, Korea, Rep.	Hard	(South Korea) Lee Hyung-taik	(South Korea) Han Min-kyu (South Korea) Lee Sang-hoon
USA F3 Futures $15,000	May 25	Boca Raton, USA	Clay	(Haiti) Ronald Agénor	(United States) Tad Berkowitz (Mexico) Javier Gutiérrez
Yugoslavia F3 Futures $10,000	May 25	Belgrade, Yugoslavia	Clay	(Czech Republic) Václav Roubíček	(Czech Republic) Daniel Fiala (Australia) Dejan Petrović

=== June ===
Tournament	Date	City	Surface	Singles champions	Doubles champions
Germany F9 Futures $10,000	June 1	Villingen, Germany	Clay	(Spain) David Caballero	(Czech Republic) Leoš Friedl (Australia) Steven Randjelovic
Ireland F1 Futures $15,000	June 1	Dublin, Ireland	Carpet	(Australia) Michael Hill	(Israel) Harel Levy (Israel) Raviv Weidenfeld
Italy F8 Futures $10,000	June 1	Bressanone, Italy	Clay	(Czech Republic) Radovan Světlík	(Czech Republic) Radovan Světlík (Slovenia) Borut Urh
Korea F2 Futures $15,000	June 1	Seogwipo, Korea, Rep.	Hard	(South Korea) Lee Hyung-taik	(South Korea) Kim Dong-hyun (South Korea) Kim Young-jun
USA F4 Futures $15,000	June 1	Tallahassee, USA	Clay	(Philippines) Cecil Mamiit	(Philippines) Cecil Mamiit (United Kingdom) Kyle Spencer
Yugoslavia F3A Futures $10,000	June 1	Niš, Yugoslavia	Clay	(Italy) Matteo Colla	(Czech Republic) Daniel Fiala (Australia) Dejan Petrović
Finland F1 Futures $10,000	June 8	Oulu, Finland	Clay	(Finland) Ville Liukko	(Sweden) Tobias Hildebrand (Finland) Ville Liukko
Ireland F2 Futures $15,000	June 8	Dublin, Ireland	Carpet	(Austria) Julian Knowle	(United States) Scott Humphries (Australia) Michael Hill
Italy F9 Futures $10,000	June 8	Valdengo, Italy	Clay	(Slovenia) Borut Urh	(France) Nicolas Kischkewitz (France) Guillaume Marx
Yugoslavia F3B Futures $10,000	June 8	Zaječar, Yugoslavia	Clay	(Bulgaria) Milen Velev	(Czech Republic) Daniel Fiala (Australia) Dejan Petrović
Canada F1 Futures $10,000	June 15	Mississauga, Canada	Hard	(Azerbaijan) Emin Ağayev	(Lebanon) Ali Hamadeh (United States) Todd Meringoff
Finland F2 Futures $10,000	June 15	Vierumäki, Finland	Clay	(Finland) Tommi Lenho	(Sweden) Johan Landsberg (Sweden) Klas Pettersson
Greece F4 Futures $15,000	June 15	Corfu, Greece	Carpet	(Israel) Lior Mor	(Belgium) Gilles Elseneer (Belgium) Wim Neefs
Macedonia F1 Futures $10,000	June 15	Skopje, Macedonia	Clay	(France) Cyril Buscaglione	(Austria) Matej Pampoulov (Bulgaria) Milen Velev
Poland F1 Futures $15,000	June 15	Kraków, Poland	Clay	(Argentina) Andrés Schneiter	(Czech Republic) Tomáš Cibulec (Poland) Piotr Szczepanik
USA F5 Futures $15,000	June 15	Lafayette, USA	Hard	(Philippines) Cecil Mamiit	(United States) Chris Groer (United States) Mitch Sprengelmeyer
Italy F10 Futures $10,000	June 16	Turin, Italy	Clay	(France) Olivier Malcor	(Italy) Omar Camporese (Portugal) João Cunha e Silva
Germany F10 Futures $10,000	June 17	Albstadt, Germany	Clay	(Germany) Daniel Elsner	(Spain) Juan Giner (Spain) Jose Maria Vicente
Hungary F1 Futures $10,000	June 17	Budapest, Hungary	Clay	(Austria) Rainer Falenti	(Hungary) Kornél Bardóczky (Hungary) Miklós Jancsó
Canada F2 Futures $10,000	June 22	Montreal, Canada	Hard	(South Korea) Lee Hyung-taik	(Canada) Simon Larose (Canada) Jocelyn Robichaud
Croatia F1 Futures $10,000	June 22	Veli Lošinj, Croatia	Clay	(Slovenia) Marko Tkalec	(Croatia) Saša Hiršzon (Croatia) Željko Krajan
Finland F3 Futures $10,000	June 22	Hämeenlinna, Finland	Clay	(Finland) Tapio Nurminen	(Finland) Lassi Ketola (Finland) Janne Ojala
Greece F5 Futures $15,000	June 22	Athens, Greece	Clay	(Israel) Lior Mor	(Israel) Lior Mor (Belgium) Wim Neefs
Macedonia F2 Futures $10,000	June 22	Kočani, Macedonia	Clay	(Bulgaria) Mark Markov	(Austria) Matej Pampoulov (Bulgaria) Milen Velev
Poland F2 Futures $15,000	June 22	Zabrze, Poland	Clay	(Czech Republic) Jan Hernych	(Czech Republic) František Čermák (Czech Republic) Petr Dezort
USA F6 Futures $15,000	June 22	Waco, USA	Hard	(United States) Bob Bryan	(United States) Bob Bryan (United States) Mike Bryan
Germany F11 Futures $15,000	June 24	Trier, Germany	Clay	(Germany) Daniel Elsner	(Germany) Gerald Fauser (Germany) Thomas Messmer
Hungary F2 Futures $10,000	June 24	Budapest, Hungary	Clay	(Hungary) Kornél Bardóczky	(Hungary) László Fonó (Hungary) Krisztian Keresztes
Canada F3 Futures $10,000	June 29	Boucherville, Canada	Hard	(South Korea) Lee Hyung-taik	(United States) Tad Berkowitz (Mexico) Javier Gutiérrez
Croatia F2 Futures $10,000	June 29	Mali Lošinj, Croatia	Clay	(Slovakia) Vladimír Pláteník	(Croatia) Luka Kutanjac (Slovakia) Vladimír Pláteník
Denmark F1 Futures $10,000	June 29	Kolding, Denmark	Clay	(Denmark) Frederik Fetterlein	(Australia) Phillip Harris (Australia) Todd Perry
USA F7 Futures $15,000	June 29	College Station, USA	Hard	(United States) Ryan Sachire	(United States) Ben Gabler (United States) Arvid Swan

=== July ===
Tournament	Date	City	Surface	Singles champions	Doubles champions
Germany F12 Futures $15,000	July 1	Kassel, Germany	Clay	(Argentina) Andrés Schneiter	(Italy) Enzo Artoni (Argentina) Federico Browne
Hungary F3 Futures $10,000	July 1	Sopron, Hungary	Clay	(Hungary) Gergely Kisgyörgy	(Hungary) Gergely Kisgyörgy (Australia) Dejan Petrović
Croatia F3 Futures $10,000	July 6	Mali Lošinj, Croatia	Clay	(Australia) Allen Belobrajdic	(Croatia) Goran Prpić (Croatia) Krešimir Ritz
Denmark F2 Futures $10,000	July 6	Odense, Denmark	Clay	(United States) Rafael de Mesa	(Denmark) Jonathan Printzlau (Denmark) Jan Tribler
France F1 Futures $10,000	July 6	Bourg-en-Bresse, France	Clay	(France) Jérôme Haehnel	(United States) Hugo Armando (Argentina) Pablo Bianchi
Greece F6 Futures $15,000	July 6	Veria, Greece	Hard	(Israel) Lior Mor	(Germany) Markus Menzler (Germany) Patrick Sommer
Spain F1 Futures $15,000	July 6	Albufereta, Spain	Clay	(Argentina) Andrés Schneiter	(Spain) Juan Giner (Spain) Jose Maria Vicente
USA F8 Futures $15,000	July 6	Tulsa, USA	Hard	(United States) Bob Bryan	(United States) Bob Bryan (United States) Mike Bryan
Austria F4 Futures $10,000	July 8	Seefeld, Austria	Clay	(Czech Republic) Petr Dezort	(Czech Republic) Adolf Musil (Australia) Dejan Petrović
Germany F13 Futures $10,000	July 8	Leun, Germany	Clay	(Germany) Tomas Behrend	(Germany) Mathias Huning (Germany) Tobias Huning
Denmark F3 Futures $10,000	July 13	Svendborg, Denmark	Clay	(Sweden) Johan Settergren	(Australia) Leigh Holland (Australia) Joseph Sirianni
France F2 Futures $10,000	July 13	Aix-en-Provence, France	Clay	(Argentina) Carlos Gómez-Díaz	(United States) Hugo Armando (Argentina) Pablo Bianchi
Greece F7 Futures $15,000	July 13	Athens, Greece	Clay	(Israel) Harel Levy	(Israel) Harel Levy (Israel) Lior Mor
Spain F2 Futures $15,000	July 13	Elche, Spain	Clay	(Argentina) Gastón Gaudio	(Spain) Sergi Durán (Spain) Javier Perez-Vazquez
Austria F5 Futures $10,000	July 15	Schwaz, Austria	Clay	(Argentina) Héctor Moretti	(Australia) Paul Hanley (Australia) Dejan Petrović
Slovenia F1 Futures $10,000	July 15	Kranj, Slovenia	Clay	(Czech Republic) Pavel Kudrnáč	(Czech Republic) Leoš Friedl (Czech Republic) Petr Kovačka
Austria F6 Futures $10,000	July 20	Bergheim, Austria	Clay	(Austria) Alexander Peya	(Germany) Patrick Sommer (Germany) Markus Wislsperger
Brazil F1 Futures $15,000	July 20	Londrina, Brazil	Clay	(Argentina) Sergio Roitman	(Argentina) Damián Furmanski (Argentina) Martín García
France F3 Futures $10,000	July 20	Aix-les-Bains, France	Clay	(France) Maxime Boyé	(Argentina) Roberto Álvarez (Argentina) Pablo Bianchi
Spain F3 Futures $10,000	July 20	Gandia, Spain	Clay	(Spain) Juan Carlos Ferrero	(Spain) Gorka Fraile (Spain) Juan Antonio Saiz
Slovenia F2 Futures $10,000	July 22	Portorož, Slovenia	Clay	(Czech Republic) Jan Vacek	(Slovenia) Andrej Kračman (Slovenia) Blaž Trupej
Brazil F2 Futures $15,000	July 27	Campos do Jordão, Brazil	Hard	(Argentina) Juan Ignacio Chela	(Brazil) Nelson Aerts (Brazil) Cristiano Testa
Egypt F1 Futures $10,000	July 27	Cairo, Egypt	Clay	(Morocco) Mehdi Tahiri	(Germany) Patrick Gottesleben (Slovakia) Martin Hromec
France F4 Futures $10,000	July 27	Toulon, France	Clay	(Spain) Ivan Rodrigo	(Venezuela) Kepler Orellana (Argentina) Leonardo Olguín
Italy F11 Futures $10,000	July 27	Forlì, Italy	Clay	(Italy) Gianluca Luddi	(Italy) Florian Allgauer (Italy) Igor Gaudi
Spain F4 Futures $10,000	July 27	Dénia, Spain	Clay	(Spain) Javier Perez-Vazquez	(Spain) Pedro Canovas (Spain) Juan Giner
Slovenia F3 Futures $10,000	July 29	Novo Mesto, Slovenia	Clay	(Slovenia) Jaka Bozic	(Slovenia) Jaka Bozic (Slovenia) Blaž Trupej

=== August ===
Tournament	Date	City	Surface	Singles champions	Doubles champions
Belgium F1 Futures $15,000	August 3	Louvain-la-Neuve, Belgium	Clay	(Sweden) Kalle Flygt	(France) Nicolas Coutelot (France) Johann Potron
Ecuador F1 Futures $10,000	August 3	Guayaquil, Ecuador	Clay	(Peru) Luis Horna	(Peru) Luis Horna (Peru) Rodolfo Rake
Egypt F2 Futures $10,000	August 3	Cairo, Egypt	Clay	(Italy) Stefano Galvani	(Egypt) Amr Ghoneim (Egypt) Karim Maamoun
Estonia F1 Futures $10,000	August 3	Pärnu, Estonia	Clay	(Poland) Piotr Szczepanik	(Sweden) Henrik Andersson (Sweden) Nicklas Timfjord
Italy F12 Futures $15,000	August 3	Gardone Val Trompia, Italy	Clay	(Germany) Markus Wislsperger	(Germany) Markus Menzler (Germany) Markus Wislsperger
Spain F5 Futures $10,000	August 3	Xàtiva, Spain	Clay	(Spain) Juan Giner	(Spain) Agustin Banos (Argentina) Rafael Serpa-Guinazu
Slovenia F4 Futures $10,000	August 5	Slovenia	Clay	(Croatia) Željko Krajan	(Czech Republic) Leoš Friedl (Czech Republic) Petr Kovačka
Belarus F1 Futures $15,000	August 10	Minsk, Belarus	Carpet	(Uzbekistan) Dmitri Tomashevich	(Belarus) Evgeni Mikheev (Belarus) Andrei Samets
Belgium F2 Futures $15,000	August 10	Charleroi, Belgium	Clay	(Sweden) Fredrik Lovén	(Belgium) Arnaud Fontaine (Belgium) Wim Neefs
Croatia F4 Futures $10,000	August 10	Umag, Croatia	Clay	(Germany) Jakub Záhlava	(Croatia) Ivo Karlović (Croatia) Lovro Zovko
Ecuador F2 Futures $10,000	August 10	Quito, Ecuador	Clay	(Colombia) Miguel Tobón	(Brazil) Pedro Braga (Colombia) Juan-Camilo Gamboa
Egypt F3 Futures $10,000	August 10	Cairo, Egypt	Clay	(Morocco) Mehdi Tahiri	(Germany) Daniel Merkert (Austria) Thiemo Maier
Italy F13 Futures $15,000	August 10	Varese, Italy	Clay	(France) Cyril Saulnier	(Italy) Massimo Boscatto (Italy) Stefano Tarallo
Latvia F1 Futures $10,000	August 10	Jūrmala, Latvia	Clay	(Germany) Alexander Popp	(Italy) Manuel Jorquera (Sweden) Robert Lindstedt
Yugoslavia F5 Futures $10,000	August 10	Subotica, Yugoslavia	Clay	(Spain) Javier Perez-Vazquez	(Israel) Michael Kogan (Australia) Dejan Petrović
Ecuador F3 Futures $10,000	August 17	Ibarra, Ecuador	Clay	(Colombia) Miguel Tobón	(Colombia) Philippe Moggio (Colombia) Miguel Tobón
Italy F14 Futures $15,000	August 17	Pavia, Italy	Clay	(Belgium) Réginald Willems	(Italy) Enzo Artoni (Italy) Silvio Scaiola
Lithuania F1 Futures $10,000	August 17	Vilnius, Lithuania	Carpet	(Sweden) Johan Örtegren	(Slovakia) Viktor Bruthans (New Zealand) James Shortall
Spain F6 Futures $15,000	August 17	Vigo, Spain	Clay	(Chile) Nicolás Massú	(Spain) Pedro Canovas (Spain) Tommy Robredo
Yugoslavia F6 Futures $10,000	August 17	Niš, Yugoslavia	Clay	(Bulgaria) Ivaylo Traykov	(Argentina) Jose Arnedo (Federal Republic of Yugoslavia) Nikola Gnjatović
Austria F7 Futures $15,000	August 18	Vienna, Austria	Clay	(Austria) Thomas Schiessling	(Czech Republic) Petr Dezort (Czech Republic) Petr Kovačka
Croatia F5 Futures $10,000	August 18	Umag, Croatia	Clay	(Croatia) Lovro Zovko	(Sweden) Simon Aspelin (Norway) Helge Koll
Russia F3 Futures $15,000	August 18	Moscow, Russia	Carpet	(Germany) Patrick Gottesleben	(Russia) Kirill Ivanov-Smolensky (Uzbekistan) Dmitri Tomashevich
Spain F7 Futures $15,000	August 24	Irun, Spain	Clay	(Chile) Nicolás Massú	(Chile) Nicolás Massú (Spain) Angel Jose Martin
Yugoslavia F7 Futures $10,000	August 24	Nikšić, Yugoslavia	Clay	(Bulgaria) Ivaylo Traykov	(Federal Republic of Yugoslavia) Nikola Gnjatović (Australia) Dejan Petrović
Austria F8 Futures $15,000	August 25	Vienna, Austria	Clay	(Czech Republic) Jan Vacek	(Belgium) Wim Neefs (Austria) Johannes Unterberger
Croatia F6 Futures $10,000	August 25	Umag, Croatia	Clay	(Croatia) Željko Krajan	(Croatia) Josip Dumanic (Croatia) Krešimir Ritz
Italy F15 Futures $15,000	August 25	Manerbio, Italy	Clay	(Czech Republic) Radovan Světlík	(Italy) Filippo Messori (Italy) Massimo Valeri
Ukraine F1 Futures $15,000	August 26	Gorlovka, Ukraine	Clay	(Ukraine) Dimitri Poliakov	(Italy) Manuel Jorquera (Ivory Coast) Claude N'Goran
Peru F1 Futures $10,000	August 31	Lima, Peru	Clay	(Peru) Luis Horna	(Brazil) Marcos Daniel (Brazil) Rodrigo Monte
Spain F8 Futures $15,000	August 31	Santander, Spain	Clay	(Spain) Juan Carlos Ferrero	(Sweden) Daniel Pahlsson (Sweden) Robert Samuelsson

=== September ===
Tournament	Date	City	Surface	Singles champions	Doubles champions
Romania F1 Futures $15,000	September 1	Galați, Romania	Clay	(Poland) Bartłomiej Dąbrowski	(Austria) Julian Knowle (Poland) Piotr Szczepanik
Ukraine F2 Futures $15,000	September 1	Gorlovka, Ukraine	Clay	(Russia) Igor Kunitsyn	(Russia) Kirill Ivanov-Smolensky (Uzbekistan) Dmitri Tomashevich
France F5 Futures $15,000	September 7	Bagnères-de-Bigorre, France	Hard	(France) Thierry Guardiola	(Monaco) Jean-René Lisnard (France) Michaël Llodra
Peru F2 Futures $10,000	September 7	Lima, Peru	Clay	(Peru) Luis Horna	(Paraguay) Paulo Carvallo (Argentina) Edgardo Massa
Romania F2 Futures $15,000	September 7	Bacău, Romania	Clay	(Poland) Bartłomiej Dąbrowski	(Italy) Manuel Jorquera (Sweden) Robert Lindstedt
Spain F9 Futures $15,000	September 7	Oviedo, Spain	Clay	(France) Rodolphe Cadart	(Spain) David Morente (Germany) Andreas Weber
Spain F10 Futures $15,000	September 12	, Spain	Outdoor		
France F6 Futures $15,000	September 14	Mulhouse, France	Hard (i)	(Switzerland) Lorenzo Manta	(United States) Andrew Rueb (South Africa) Vaughan Snyman
Norway F1 Futures $10,000	September 14	Oslo, Norway	Carpet (i)	(Sweden) Nicklas Timfjord	(Norway) Lars Hjarrand (Norway) Helge Koll
Peru F3 Futures $10,000	September 14	Lima, Peru	Clay	(Peru) Luis Horna	(Paraguay) Paulo Carvallo (Argentina) Edgardo Massa
Bolivia F1 Futures $10,000	September 21	La Paz, Bolivia	Clay	(Argentina) Emiliano Redondi	(Brazil) Pedro Braga (Mexico) Víctor Romero
France F7 Futures $15,000	September 21	Plaisir, France	Hard (i)	(France) Rodolphe Gilbert	(United States) Andrew Rueb (South Africa) Vaughan Snyman
Sweden F1 Futures $10,000	September 22	Gothenburg, Sweden	Hard (i)	(Sweden) Fredrik Jonsson	(United States) Mitty Arnold (United States) Todd Meringoff
Great Britain F7 Futures $10,000	September 23	Sunderland, Great Britain	Hard (i)	(United Kingdom) Martin Lee	(United Kingdom) Ross Matheson (United Kingdom) Tom Spinks
Bolivia F2 Futures $10,000	September 28	Cochabamba, Bolivia	Clay	(Paraguay) Paulo Carvallo	(Togo) Jean-Kome Loglo (Cuba) Lázaro Navarro
France F8 Futures $15,000	September 28	Nevers, France	Hard (i)	(France) Rodolphe Gilbert	(Monaco) Jean-René Lisnard (France) Michaël Llodra
Sweden F2 Futures $10,000	September 28	Gothenburg, Sweden	Hard (i)	(Sweden) Mathias Hellström	(Sweden) Joel Christensen (Sweden) Robert Lindstedt
Yugoslavia F8 Futures $15,000	September 28	Belgrade, Yugoslavia	Clay		
Great Britain F8 Futures $10,000	September 30	Glasgow, Great Britain	Hard (i)	(Germany) Alexander Popp	(United Kingdom) James Davidson (United Kingdom) David Sherwood
Japan F3 Futures $15,000	September 30	Fukuoka, Japan	Carpet	(South Korea) Kwon Oh-hee	(Chinese Taipei) Chen Chih-jung (Chinese Taipei) Lin Bing-chao

=== October ===
Tournament	Date	City	Surface	Singles champions	Doubles champions
Bolivia F3 Futures $10,000	October 5	Santa Cruz, Bolivia	Clay	(Argentina) Diego Veronelli	(Chile) Sebastian Contador (Colombia) Eduardo Rincón
Finland F4 Futures $10,000	October 5	Oulu, Finland	Carpet (i)	(Sweden) Andreas Vinciguerra	(Sweden) Robert Lindstedt (Sweden) Robert Samuelsson
France F9 Futures $10,000	October 5	Forbach, France	Carpet (i)	(Belgium) Olivier Rochus	(Czech Republic) Pavel Kudrnáč (Czech Republic) Radim Žitko
Uzbekistan F4 Futures $15,000	October 5	Fergana, Uzbekistan	Hard	(Russia) Andrei Stoliarov	(Uzbekistan) Oleg Ogorodov (Uzbekistan) Dmitri Tomashevich
Great Britain F9 Futures $15,000	October 7	Leeds, Great Britain	Hard (i)	(Germany) Alexander Popp	(United Kingdom) Iain Bates (Germany) Alexander Popp
Japan F4 Futures $15,000	October 7	Maishima, Japan	Carpet	(South Korea) Lee Hyung-taik	(South Korea) Lee Hyung-taik (South Korea) Yoon Yong-il
Argentina F3 Futures $10,000	October 12	Santa Fe, Argentina	Clay	(Argentina) Roberto Álvarez	(Argentina) Ignacio González King (Argentina) Edgardo Massa
France F10 Futures $10,000	October 12	Saint-Dizier, France	Hard (i)	(France) Simon Blanc	(Czech Republic) Pavel Kudrnáč (Czech Republic) Radim Žitko
Uzbekistan F5 Futures $15,000	October 12	Qarshi, Uzbekistan	Hard	(Uzbekistan) Oleg Ogorodov	(Uzbekistan) Oleg Ogorodov (Uzbekistan) Dmitri Tomashevich
Great Britain F10 Futures $15,000	October 14	Edinburgh, Great Britain	Hard (i)	(Germany) Alexander Popp	(Australia) Ashley Naumann (United States) Andrew Rueb
Argentina F4 Futures $10,000	October 19	Resistencia, Chaco, Argentina	Clay	(Argentina) Roberto Álvarez	(Argentina) Mauro Barman (Argentina) Sebastian Di Stefano
France F11 Futures $10,000	October 19	La Roche-sur-Yon, France	Hard (i)	(France) Rodolphe Cadart	(France) Régis Lavergne (France) Guillaume Marx
Argentina F5 Futures $10,000	October 26	Buenos Aires, Argentina	Clay	(Argentina) Juan Ignacio Chela	(Italy) Enzo Artoni (Argentina) Miguel Pastura
Brunei F1 Futures $10,000	October 26	Bandar Seri Begawan, Brunei	Hard	(United States) Michael Jessup	(Japan) Thomas Shimada (United States) Jim Thomas
France F12 Futures $10,000	October 26	Rodez, France	Hard (i)	(Belgium) Olivier Rochus	(France) Stéphane Matheu (France) Olivier Morel
Tunisia F1 Futures $15,000	October 26	Tunis, Tunisia	Clay	(France) Rodolphe Cadart	(Spain) Óscar Burrieza (Spain) Agustin Banos
Australia F1 Futures $15,000	October 28	Beaumaris, Australia	Clay	(Australia) Joseph Sirianni	(Australia) Paul Hanley (Australia) Nathan Healey

=== November ===
Tournament	Date	City	Surface	Singles champions	Doubles champions
Brazil F3 Futures $10,000	November 2	Recife, Brazil	Hard	(Brazil) Leonardo Silva	(Brazil) Marcos Daniel (Brazil) Alexandre Simoni
Paraguay F1 Futures $10,000	November 2	Asunción, Paraguay	Clay	(Argentina) Juan Ignacio Chela	(Argentina) Damián Furmanski (Argentina) Martín García
Thailand F1 Futures $10,000	November 2	Bangkok, Thailand	Hard	(Thailand) Paradorn Srichaphan	(Chinese Taipei) Chen Chih-jung (Chinese Taipei) Lin Bing-chao
Tunisia F2 Futures $15,000	November 2	Tunis, Tunisia	Clay	(Spain) Óscar Burrieza	(Czech Republic) František Čermák (Czech Republic) Petr Dezort
Australia F2 Futures $15,000	November 4	Frankston, Australia	Clay	(Australia) Toby Mitchell	(Belgium) Kris Goossens (Australia) Toby Mitchell
Brazil F4 Futures $10,000	November 9	Piracicaba, Brazil	Clay	(Brazil) Paulo Taicher	(Brazil) Daniel Melo (Brazil) Antonio Prieto
India F4 Futures $15,000	November 9	Calcutta, India	Clay	(Russia) Vadim Kutsenko	(Russia) Vadim Kutsenko (Uzbekistan) Oleg Ogorodov
Paraguay F2 Futures $10,000	November 9	Asunción, Paraguay	Clay	(Argentina) Sergio Roitman	(Paraguay) Paulo Carvallo (Uruguay) Gonzalo Rodríguez
Vietnam F1 Futures $10,000	November 9	Ho Chi Minh City, Vietnam	Hard	(Chinese Taipei) Lin Bing-chao	(Chinese Taipei) Chen Chih-jung (Chinese Taipei) Lin Bing-chao
Brazil F5 Futures $10,000	November 16	Florianópolis, Brazil	Clay	(Uruguay) Federico Dondo	(Brazil) Daniel Melo (Brazil) Antonio Prieto
Chile F1 Futures $10,000	November 16	Santiago, Chile	Clay	(Chile) Gabriel Keymer	(Chile) Fernando González (Colombia) Miguel Tobón
Paraguay F3 Futures $10,000	November 16	Asunción, Paraguay	Clay	(Argentina) Sergio Roitman	(Paraguay) Paulo Carvallo (Uruguay) Gonzalo Rodríguez
Pakistan F1 Futures $15,000	November 17	Islamabad, Pakistan	Clay	(Croatia) Ivan Vajda	(Russia) Vadim Kutsenko (Uzbekistan) Oleg Ogorodov
Australia F3 Futures $15,000	November 18	Berri, Australia	Grass	(Australia) Ben Ellwood	(Australia) Paul Hanley (Australia) Nathan Healey
Japan F5 Futures $15,000	November 18	Kumamoto, Japan	Hard	(South Korea) Kwon Oh-hee	(Japan) Yaoki Ishii (Japan) Mitsuru Takada
Brazil F6 Futures $15,000	November 23	Curitiba, Brazil	Clay	(Austria) Thomas Schiessling	(Brazil) Daniel Melo (Brazil) Antonio Prieto
Chile F2 Futures $10,000	November 23	Viña del Mar, Chile	Clay	(Chile) Hermes Gamonal	(Chile) Sergio Cortés (Chile) Francisco Ruiz
Uruguay F1 Futures $10,000	November 23	Montevideo, Uruguay	Clay	(Argentina) Agustín Garizzio	(Paraguay) Paulo Carvallo (Uruguay) Gonzalo Rodríguez
USA F9 Futures $15,000	November 23	Tucson, USA	Hard	(Venezuela) Kepler Orellana	(Sweden) Simon Aspelin (Netherlands) Djalmar Sistermans
Australia F4 Futures $15,000	November 25	Barmera, Australia	Grass	(New Zealand) Alistair Hunt	(Australia) Jordan Kerr (Australia) Michael Logarzo
Japan F6 Futures $15,000	November 25	Saitama, Japan	Hard	(Japan) Satoshi Iwabuchi	(United States) Michael Jessup (United States) Minh Le
Brazil F7 Futures $15,000	November 30	Pouso Alegre, Brazil	Clay	(Austria) Thomas Schiessling	(Brazil) Daniel Melo (Brazil) Antonio Prieto
Chile F3 Futures $10,000	November 30	Santiago, Chile	Clay	(Chile) Fernando González	(Germany) Sascha Bandermann (Argentina) Federico Browne
Uruguay F2 Futures $10,000	November 30	Paysandú, Uruguay	Clay	(Argentina) Agustín Garizzio	(Paraguay) Paulo Carvallo (Uruguay) Gonzalo Rodríguez
USA F10 Futures $15,000	November 30	Phoenix, USA	Hard	(United States) Michael Joyce	(United States) Bob Bryan (United States) Mike Bryan
USA F11 Futures $15,000	November 30	Clearwater, USA	Hard	(Portugal) João Cunha e Silva	(United States) Chris Groer (United States) Mitch Sprengelmeyer

=== December ===
Tournament	Date	City	Surface	Singles champions	Doubles champions
Uruguay F3 Futures $10,000	December 7	Punta del Este, Uruguay	Clay	(Portugal) Emanuel Couto	(Uruguay) Alejandro Olivera (Uruguay) Martin Peyrot
USA F12 Futures $15,000	December 7	Grenelefe, USA	Hard	(United States) Bob Bryan	(United States) Bob Bryan (United States) Mike Bryan
India F1 Futures $10,000	December 29	New Delhi, India	Hard	(Russia) Vadim Kutsenko	(Israel) Jonathan Erlich (Israel) Noam Okun
