= Fredrik Lovén =

Swedish tennis player (born 1976)

- Full name: Fredrik Lovén
- Country (sports): Sweden
- Born: 26 May 1976 (age 49); Sweden
- Plays: Right-handed
- Prize money: $56,189

Singles
- Career record: 0–0
- Career titles: 0; 0 Challenger, 2 Futures
- Highest ranking: No. 365 (11 November 2002)

Grand Slam singles results
- Wimbledon: Q3 (1998)

Doubles
- Career record: 1–1
- Career titles: 0; 3 Challenger, 14 Futures
- Highest ranking: No. 210 (12 November 2001)

Fredrik Lovén (born 26 May 1976) is a former professional tennis player from Sweden.

== Biography ==
Lovén made his only ATP Tour main draw appearance at the 2000 Stockholm Open, partnering Robert Lindstedt in the doubles. The pair, who had made it through qualifying, reached the quarter-finals with a win over Czech fourth seeds David Rikl and Cyril Suk.

Most of his singles matches were played on the Futures circuit. As a doubles player he won three Challenger titles.

Now based in Oslo, Lovén is the Sports Director at Heming Tennis and a former coach of WTA Tour players. He has previously coached Eleni Daniilidou, Sofia Arvidsson and Kaia Kanepi.

== ATP Challenger and ITF Futures finals ==
=== Singles: 4 (2–2) ===
Legend ATP Challenger (0–0) ITF Futures (2–2)	Finals by surface Hard (0–2) Clay (1–0) Grass (0–0) Carpet (1–0)

Result	W–L	Date	Tournament	Tier	Surface	Opponent	Score
Win	1–0	Feb 1998	Great Britain F2, Chigwell	Futures	Carpet	(United Kingdom) Ross Matheson	6–4, 6–1
Loss	1–1	Mar 1998	Greece F1, Seros	Futures	Hard	(Sweden) Patrik Fredriksson	2–6, 2–6
Win	2–1	Aug 1998	Belgium F2, Charleroi	Futures	Clay	(Belgium) Reginald Willems	6–0, 6–3
Loss	2–2	Sep 2002	Sweden F2, Gothenburg	Futures	Hard	(Sweden) Pierre Berntsson	2–6, 3–6

=== Doubles: 25 (17–8) ===
Legend ATP Challenger (3–3) ITF Futures (14–5)	Finals by surface Hard (6–3) Clay (5–2) Grass (1–0) Carpet (5–3)

Result	W–L	Date	Tournament	Tier	Surface	Partner	Opponents	Score
Win	1–0	Feb 1998	Great Britain F1, Bramhall	Futures	Carpet	(Sweden) Mathias Hellström	(Netherlands) Marc Merry (Italy) Mosé Navarra	7–6, 6–1
Win	2–0	Feb 1998	Great Britain F3, Eastbourne	Futures	Carpet	(Sweden) Kalle Flygt	(United Kingdom) Barry Cowan (United Kingdom) Tom Spinks	6–7, 6–4, 6–4
Loss	2–1	Mar 1998	Greece F1, Seros	Futures	Hard	(Sweden) Patrik Fredriksson	(Sweden) Fredrik Bergh (Sweden) Jan Hermansson	3–6, 2–6
Loss	2–2	May 1998	Germany F8, Schwaigern	Futures	Clay	(Sweden) Tobias Hildebrand	(Czech Republic) Tomáš Cibulec (Czech Republic) Petr Kovačka	6–3, 3–6, 6–7
Win	3–2	Jul 1998	Tampere, Finland	Challenger	Clay	(Sweden) Tobias Hildebrand	(Austria) Julian Knowle (Belgium) Christophe Rochus	7–6, 1–6, 6–0
Win	4–2	Sep 1999	Sweden F1, Gothenburg	Futures	Hard	(Sweden) Robert Lindstedt	(United States) Mitty Arnold (United States) Thomas Blake	3–6, 6–3, 7–6
Loss	4–3	Oct 1999	Sweden F2, Gothenburg	Futures	Hard	(Sweden) Robert Lindstedt	(United States) Mitty Arnold (United States) Thomas Blake	6–1, 6–7, 5–7
Win	5–3	Oct 1999	Great Britain F10, Edinburgh	Futures	Hard	(United Kingdom) James Davidson	(Germany) Andreas Tattermusch (Czech Republic) Robin Vik	6–3, 7–6
Loss	5–4	Jan 2000	Heilbronn, Germany	Challenger	Carpet	(Sweden) Magnus Larsson	(Netherlands) Jan Siemerink (Netherlands) John Van Lottum	5–7, 6–7^{(6–8)}
Win	6–4	Feb 2000	Great Britain F2, Chigwell	Futures	Carpet	(United Kingdom) James Davidson	(France) Maxime Boye (Croatia) Ivo Karlović	7–6^{(7–1)}, 7–6^{(7–5)}
Loss	6–5	Mar 2000	France F7, Poitiers	Futures	Carpet	(Sweden) Robert Lindstedt	(France) Maxime Boye (Croatia) Ivo Karlović	7–5, 3–6, 6–7^{(1–7)}
Win	7–5	Sep 2000	Sweden F1, Gothenburg	Futures	Carpet	(Sweden) Robert Lindstedt	(Germany) Andreas Tattermusch (Germany) Ulrich Tippenhauer	6–2, 6–4
Win	8–5	Feb 2001	Wolfsburg, Germany	Challenger	Carpet	(Sweden) Robert Lindstedt	(Germany) Jan Boruszewski (Germany) Markus Menzler	7–6^{(8–6)}, 6–7^{(7–9)}, 6–4
Win	9–5	May 2001	Great Britain F5, Newcastle	Futures	Clay	(Sweden) Nicklas Timfjord	(Australia) Steven Randjelovic (Sweden) Robert Samuelsson	6–3, 6–0
Win	10–5	Jul 2001	Manchester, United Kingdom	Challenger	Grass	(Australia) Ben Ellwood	(South Africa) Wesley Moodie (South Africa) Shaun Rudman	4–6, 7–5, 6–4
Loss	10–6	Sep 2001	Freudenstadt, Germany	Challenger	Clay	(South Africa) Damien Roberts	(Germany) Franz Stauder (Germany) Alexander Waske	3–6, 6–4, 3–6
Win	11–6	Sep 2001	Sweden F2, Gothenburg	Futures	Hard	(Sweden) Robert Lindstedt	(Sweden) Daniel Andersson (Sweden) Robert Samuelsson	6–4, 6–4
Loss	11–7	Mar 2002	New Zealand F1, Blenheim	Futures	Hard	(Netherlands) Melle van Gemerden	(Australia) Ashley Ford (Australia) David Mcnamara	1–6, 7–5, 4–6
Win	12–7	May 2002	Germany F4, Arnsberg	Futures	Clay	(Germany) Denis Gremelmayr	(Romania) Victor Ioniță (Germany) Daniel Lesske	6–1, 6–2
Win	13–7	Sep 2002	Sweden F1, Gothenburg	Futures	Hard	(Sweden) Kalle Flygt	(Sweden) Rickard Holmstrom (Sweden) Nicklas Timfjord	7–5, 5–7, 6–4
Loss	13–8	Feb 2003	Lübeck, Germany	Challenger	Carpet	(Sweden) Robert Lindstedt	(Czech Republic) Ota Fukárek (Australia) Jordan Kerr	3–6, 6–3, 3–6
Win	14–8	Apr 2003	Germany F1, Riemerling	Futures	Clay	(Sweden) Robert Lindstedt	(France) Édouard Roger-Vasselin (France) Jo-Wilfried Tsonga	6–4, 6–1
Win	15–8	May 2003	Germany F2, Esslingen	Futures	Clay	(Sweden) Robert Lindstedt	(Germany) Sebastian Jaeger (Germany) Florian Jeschonek	6–3, 6–4
Win	16–8	Sep 2003	Sweden F1, Gothenburg	Futures	Hard	(Sweden) Mathias Hellström	(Australia) Mark Hlawaty (Germany) Simon Stadler	6–4, 6–4
Win	17–8	Sep 2003	Sweden F2, Gothenburg	Futures	Hard	(Sweden) Mathias Hellström	(Finland) Lassi Ketola (Finland) Janne Ojala	6–3, 7–5
