= Massimo Boscatto =

Italian tennis player (born 1971)

- Full name: Massimo Boscatto
- Country (sports): Italy
- Born: 21 June 1971 (age 53); Naples, Italy
- Height: 5 ft 10 in (178 cm)
- Turned pro: 1988
- Plays: Right-handed
- Prize money: $46,799

Singles
- Career record: 0–2
- Career titles: 0; 0 Challenger, 0 Futures
- Highest ranking: No. 355 (15 April 1991)

Grand Slam singles results
- Australian Open: Q1 (1988)

Doubles
- Career record: 10–11
- Career titles: 0; 3 Challenger, 1 Futures
- Highest ranking: No. 110 (24 June 1991)

Grand Slam doubles results
- Wimbledon: 1R (1991)
- Last updated on: 13 May 2023.

Massimo Boscatto (born 21 June 1971) is a former professional tennis player from Italy.

== Biography ==
Boscatto, born in Naples, Italy, was primarily a doubles player. As a junior he represented Italy in the Sunshine Cup and his biggest individual success was reaching the final of the boys' doubles event at the 1988 US Open. He and partner Stefano Pescosolido lost the final to the home pairing of Jonathan Stark and John Yancey.

At the 1991 Mediterranean Games in Athens, Boscatto again partnered with Pescosolido and together they won a gold medal in the men's doubles, secured with a win over Spaniards Alberto Berasategui and Àlex Corretja.

On tour his biggest success was in reaching the final of an ATP Tour tournament in Genoa in 1991, with Massimo Ardinghi. He also won all of his three ATP Challenger doubles titles that year.

His only Grand Slam appearance was at the 1991 Wimbledon Championships. He competed in the men's doubles with Pescosolido. They were beaten in the first round by Jeff Brown and Bret Garnett.

== Junior Grand Slam finals ==
=== Doubles: 1 (1 runner-up) ===
Result	Year	Tournament	Surface	Partner	Opponents	Score
Loss	1988	US Open	Hard	(Italy) Stefano Pescosolido	(United States) Jonathan Stark (United States) John Yancey	6–7, 5–7

== ATP career finals ==
=== Doubles: 1 (1 runner-up) ===
Legend Grand Slam Tournaments (0–0) ATP World Tour Finals (0–0) ATP Masters Series (0–0) ATP Championship Series (0–0) ATP World Series (0–1)	Finals by surface Hard (0–0) Clay (0–1) Grass (0–0) Carpet (0–0)	Finals by setting Outdoors (0–1) Indoors (0–0)

Result	W–L	Date	Tournament	Tier	Surface	Partner	Opponents	Score
Loss	0–1	Jun 1991	Genoa, Italy	World Series	Clay	(Italy) Massimo Ardinghi	(Spain) Marcos Górriz (Venezuela) Alfonso Mora	7–5, 5–7, 3–6

== ATP Challenger and ITF Futures finals ==
=== Doubles: 8 (4–4) ===
Legend ATP Challenger (3–1) ITF Futures (1–3)	Finals by surface Hard (0–0) Clay (4–4) Grass (0–0) Carpet (0–0)

Result	W–L	Date	Tournament	Tier	Surface	Partner	Opponents	Score
Win	1–0	Feb 1991	Jakarta, Indonesia	Challenger	Clay	(Italy) Massimo Ardinghi	(Australia) Peter Carter (Sweden) Niclas Kroon	5–7, 6–4, 7–6
Win	2–0	Mar 1991	Marseille, France	Challenger	Clay	(Italy) Stefano Pescosolido	(Netherlands) Tom Kempers (Netherlands) Tom Nijssen	6–2, 2–6, 6–3
Win	3–0	Oct 1991	Siracusa, Italy	Challenger	Clay	(Italy) Cristian Brandi	(Italy) Diego Nargiso (Italy) Stefano Pescosolido	3–6, 7–6, 7–6
Loss	3–1	Oct 1991	Reggio Calabria, Italy	Challenger	Clay	(Italy) Eugenio Rossi	(Italy) Cristian Brandi (Italy) Federico Mordegan	5–7, 3–6
Loss	3–2	May 1998	Yugoslavia F2, Belgrade	Futures	Clay	(Italy) Igor Gaudi	(Serbia and Montenegro) Nikola Gnjatovic (Serbia) Dejan Petrović	3–6, 6–3, 3–6
Win	4–2	Aug 1998	Italy F13, Varese	Futures	Clay	(Italy) Stefano Tarallo	(Argentina) Leonardo Olguín (Argentina) Miguel Pastura	7–6, 7–5
Loss	4–3	Aug 1998	Italy F14, Pavia	Futures	Clay	(Italy) Stefano Tarallo	(Italy) Enzo Artoni (Italy) Silvio Scaiola	2–6, 2–6
Loss	4–4	Aug 1998	Italy F15, Manerbio	Futures	Clay	(France) Nicolas Kischkewitz	(Italy) Filippo Messori (Italy) Massimo Valeri	4–6, 6–3, 1–6
