= Enrique Abaroa =

Mexican tennis player (born 1974)

- Country (sports): Mexico
- Residence: Monterrey, Mexico
- Born: 10 January 1974 (age 51); Monterrey, Mexico
- Height: 1.83 m (6 ft 0 in)
- Plays: Right-handed
- Prize money: $25,258

Singles
- Career record: 0–0
- Career titles: 0; 0 Challenger, 0 Futures
- Highest ranking: No. 607 (2 August 1993)

Doubles
- Career record: 0–3
- Career titles: 0; 1 Challenger, 5 Futures
- Highest ranking: No. 170 (10 July 2000)
- Last updated on: 5 December 2021.

Enrique Abaroa Martinez (born 10 January 1974) is a Mexican former tennis player.

Abaroa has a career high ATP singles ranking of 607 achieved on 2 August 1993. He also has a career high ATP doubles ranking of 170 achieved on 10 July 2000.

Abaroa represented Mexico at the Davis Cup, where he had a W/L record of 0–1.

== Junior Grand Slam finals ==
=== Doubles: 1 (1 title) ===
Result	Year	Tournament	Surface	Partner	Opponents	Score
Win	1992	French Open	Clay	(Australia) Grant Doyle	(Russia) Yevgeny Kafelnikov (Germany) Alex Rădulescu	7–6^{(7–0)}, 6–3

== ATP Challenger and ITF Futures finals ==
=== Doubles: 8 (6–2) ===
Legend ATP Challenger (1–1) ITF Futures (5–1)	Finals by surface Hard (1–1) Clay (5–1) Grass (0–0) Carpet (0–0)

Result	W–L	Date	Tournament	Tier	Surface	Partner	Opponents	Score
Win	1–0	Jun 1999	Germany F4B, Riemerling	Futures	Clay	(Argentina) Damián Furmanski	(Russia) Yuri Schukin (Germany) Erik Truempler	6–4, 6–0
Win	2–0	Jun 1999	Poland F1, Kraków	Futures	Clay	(Czech Republic) Pavel Kudrnáč	(Czech Republic) Jaroslav Levinský (Czech Republic) Pavel Šnobel	6–3, 6–1
Win	3–0	Jul 1999	Spain F2, Alicante	Futures	Clay	(Australia) Ashley Fisher	(Australia) Tim Crichton (Australia) Todd Perry	6–4, 2–6, 7–6
Win	4–0	Jun 2000	USA F14, Tampa	Futures	Clay	(Colombia) Mauricio Hadad	(United States) Mitty Arnold (United States) James Blake	6–1, 7–6^{(7–2)}
Loss	4–1	Jul 2000	Eisenach, Germany	Challenger	Clay	(Australia) Tim Crichton	(Brazil) Daniel Melo (Brazil) Alexandre Simoni	1–6, 7–6^{(7–2)}, 1–6
Win	5–1	Oct 2000	Tulsa, United States	Challenger	Hard	(United States) Michael Sell	(Romania) Gabriel Trifu (United States) Glenn Weiner	5–7, 6–4, 6–2
Win	6–1	May 2001	USA F13, Tampa	Futures	Clay	(Australia) Lee Pearson	(Australia) Jaymon Crabb (Australia) James Sekulov	7–6^{(7–3)}, 6–4
Loss	6–2	Oct 2003	Mexico F17, Monterrey	Futures	Hard	(Mexico) Luis-Manuel Flores	(Brazil) Franco Ferreiro (Mexico) Eduardo Magadan-Castro	5–7, 4–6
