= Maxime Boyé =

French tennis player

- Country (sports): France
- Born: 6 March 1976 (age 49)
- Plays: Left-handed
- Prize money: $36,518

Singles
- Highest ranking: No. 299 (13 Aug 2001)

Grand Slam singles results
- Australian Open: Q1 (1993)
- French Open: Q1 (1994)

Doubles
- Career record: 0–1
- Highest ranking: No. 235 (3 Apr 2000)

Maxime Boyé (French: [maksim bwaje]; born 6 March 1976) is a French former professional tennis player.

== Career ==
As a junior, Boyé was a left-handed prodigious player from Nancy who won several youth tournaments. In 1990, Boyé became one of the few players to win both the Petits As and the European Junior Championships in the same year. Two years later, in 1992, Boyé won a World Youth Cup (Junior Davis Cup) title for France. He was a junior doubles finalist at the 1994 French Open, partnering Nicolas Escudé.

Boyé had a best singles ranking of 299 on the professional tour and made an ATP Tour doubles main draw appearance at the 1992 Bordeaux Open. At ATP Challenger level, he was a doubles finalist in Mumbai in 2000 and as a singles qualifier in Hull in 2001 made the semi-finals. He won one singles and five doubles titles on the ITF Futures circuit.

== ATP Challenger/ITF Futures finals ==
=== Singles: 3 (1–2) ===
Legend
ITF Futures (1–2)

Result	W–L	Date	Tournament	Tier	Surface	Opponent	Score
Win	1–0	Jul 1998	France F3, Aix-les-Bains	Futures	Clay	(Spain) Marc Canovas-Martos	7–6, 6–4
Loss	1–1	Aug 1998	Spain F7, Irun	Futures	Clay	(Chile) Nicolás Massú	4–6, 6–3, 3–6
Loss	1–2	Jan 2001	USA F2, Delray Beach	Futures	Hard	(Japan) Yaoki Ishii	2–6, 4–6

=== Doubles: 12 (5–7) ===
Legend
ATP Challenger (0–1)
ITF Futures (5–6)

Result	W–L	Date	Tournament	Tier	Surface	Partner	Opponents	Score
Loss	0–1	Mar 1998	Philippines F1, Manila	Futures	Hard	(France) Thierry Guardiola	(United States) Cecil Mamiit (Philippines) Eric Taino	6–4, 2–6, 1–6
Win	1–1	Apr 1999	Italy F3 Rome	Futures	Clay	(France) Nicolas Kischkewitz	(Sweden) Jan Hermansson (Sweden) Robert Lindstedt	3–6, 6–2, 6–3
Loss	1–2	Apr 1999	Italy F4, Frascati	Futures	Clay	(France) Nicolas Kischkewitz	(Argentina) Daniel Caracciolo (Argentina) Diego Palmeiro	6–7, 1–6
Loss	1–3	Jun 1999	Italy F10, Pavia	Futures	Clay	(Israel) Harel Levy	(Hungary) Gergely Kisgyörgy (Australia) Dejan Petrović	7–6, 3–6, 1–6
Win	2–3	Jun 1999	Hungary F2, Budapest	Futures	Clay	(France) Olivier Malcor	(Hungary) Zoltán Böröczky (Hungary) Balazs Vaci	6–2, 6–1
Win	3–3	Jul 1999	France F6, Bourg-en-Bresse	Futures	Clay	(France) Jean-Michel Pequery	(United States) Hugo Armando (United States) Minh Le	W/O
Win	4–3	Jul 1999	France F7, Aix-en-Provence	Futures	Clay	(France) Julien Varlet	(France) Arnaud Clément (France) Sebastien Lami	6–4, 6–4
Loss	4–4	Feb 2000	Great Britain F2, Chigwell	Futures	Carpet	(Croatia) Ivo Karlović	(United Kingdom) James Davidson (Sweden) Fredrik Lovén	6–7^{(1)}, 6–7^{(5)}
Loss	0–1	Mar 2000	Mumbai Challenger, Mumbai	Challenger	Hard	(Israel) Jonathan Erlich	(Czech Republic) Tomáš Anzari (Japan) Satoshi Iwabuchi	6–7^{(9)}, 4–6
Win	5–4	Mar 2000	France F7, Poitiers	Futures	Carpet	(Croatia) Ivo Karlović	(Sweden) Robert Lindstedt (Sweden) Fredrik Lovén	5–7, 6–3, 7–6^{(1)}
Loss	5–5	Apr 2000	France F10, Saint-Brieuc	Futures	Clay	(France) Jérôme Hanquez	(France) Sebastiende Chaunac (France) Olivier Patience	W/O
Loss	5–6	Mar 2002	France F6 Lille	Futures	Hard	(France) Thomas Dupré	(France) Julien Benneteau (France) Nicolas Mahut	3–6, 5–7
