= Nikola Gnjatović =

Serbian tennis player

- Country (sports): Yugoslavia
- Born: 15 September 1979 (age 45); Vračar, Serbia, Yugoslavia
- Plays: Right-handed

Singles
- Career record: 0–2 (Davis Cup)
- Highest ranking: No. 759 (3 May 1999)

Doubles
- Career record: 0–1 (Davis Cup)
- Highest ranking: No. 424 (17 May 1999)

Nikola Gnjatović (born 15 September 1979) is a Serbian former professional tennis player.

Gnjatović was born in Vračar, Belgrade and started out at the Košutnjak tennis club. When he was 16 he won Yugoslavia's national under 18s championship in both singles and doubles. Srđan Đoković, father of Novak, once said that he had never seen a more talented player. In 1999, he represented the Yugoslavia Davis Cup team for a tie against Morocco in Casablanca. His career however soon unravelled after he began taking heroin. He became addicted to the drug and over a 17 year period was hospitalised on numerous occasions, but is now clean.

== ITF Futures finals ==
=== Doubles: 4 (3–1) ===
| Result | W–L | Date | Tournament | Surface | Partner | Opponents | Score |
|---|---|---|---|---|---|---|---|
| Loss | 0–1 | May 1998 | Yugoslavia F1, Belgrade | Clay | (Federal Republic of Yugoslavia) Mirko Jovanović | (Slovakia) Martin Hromec (Czech Republic) Adolf Musil | 1–6, 2–6 |
| Win | 1–1 | May 1998 | Yugoslavia F2, Belgrade | Clay | (Australia) Dejan Petrović | (Italy) Massimo Boscatto (Italy) Igor Gaudi | 6–3, 3–6, 6–3 |
| Win | 2–1 | Aug 1998 | Yugoslavia F6, Niš | Clay | (Argentina) Jose-Maria Arnedo | (Slovakia) Martin Hromec (Australia) Dejan Petrović | 6–4, 7–6 |
| Win | 3–1 | Aug 1998 | Yugoslavia F7, Nikšić | Clay | (Australia) Dejan Petrović | (Argentina) Jose-Maria Arnedo (Israel) Michael Kogan | 6–4, 5–7, 6–2 |

== See also ==
- List of Serbia Davis Cup team representatives
