= Adolf Musil =

Czech tennis player (born 1974)

- Country (sports): Czech Republic
- Born: 10 February 1974 (age 51)
- Prize money: $15,012

Singles
- Career record: 0–1
- Highest ranking: No. 330 (21 Aug 1995)

Doubles
- Career record: 0–1
- Highest ranking: No. 279 (30 Mar 1998)

Adolf Musil (born 10 February 1974) is a Czech former professional tennis player.

Musil reached a career best singles ranking of 330 on the professional tour. He had a win over world number 52 Fabrice Santoro at the 1995 Graz Challenger and qualified for an ATP Tour main draw at the 1996 Croatian Indoors.

== ITF Futures titles ==
=== Doubles: (2) ===
No.	Date	Tournament	Surface	Partner	Opponents	Score
1.	May 1998	Yugoslavia F1, Belgrade	Clay	(Slovakia) Martin Hromec	(Federal Republic of Yugoslavia) Nikola Gnjatović (Federal Republic of Yugoslavia) Mirko Jovanović	6–1, 6–2
2.	Jul 1998	Austria F4, Seefeld	Clay	(Australia) Dejan Petrović	(Austria) Ronald Dueller (Austria) Zbynek Mlynarik	6–4, 6–3
