= Guillaume Marx =

French tennis player

- Full name: Guillaume Marx
- Country (sports): France
- Born: 24 May 1972 (age 53)
- Prize money: $76,331

Singles
- Career record: 0–2
- Highest ranking: No. 236 (21 February 2000)

Doubles
- Career record: 0–3
- Highest ranking: No. 230 (27 October 1997)

Grand Slam doubles results
- French Open: 1R (1993, 1997)

Guillaume Marx (born 24 May 1972) is a former professional tennis player from France.

== Biography ==
Marx had a best singles ranking of 236 in the world. He qualified for the main draw of two ATP Tour tournaments in 1993, the Italian Open (Rome Masters) and Swiss Open. As a doubles player, he played in the main draw of the French Open men's doubles events in both 1993 and 1997.

Now based in Canada, Marx is the former coach of Félix Auger-Aliassime and has previously worked with Milos Raonic.

== Challenger titles ==
=== Doubles: (1) ===
No.	Year	Tournament	Surface	Partner	Opponents	Score
1.	1997	Mallorca, Spain	Clay	(Italy) Massimo Ardinghi	(United States) Devin Bowen (Egypt) Tamer El-Sawy	6–3, 6–2
