= Franz Stauder =

German tennis player

- Full name: Franz Stauder
- Country (sports): Germany
- Born: 28 May 1977 (age 48)
- Prize money: $84,765

Singles
- Career record: 0–2
- Highest ranking: No. 322 (7 June 1999)

Doubles
- Career record: 3–6
- Highest ranking: No. 147 (1 April 2002)

Franz Stauder (born 28 May 1977) is a former professional tennis player from Germany and current head coach at TC Rot-Weiß Worms.

== Biography ==
His first appearance in the main draw of an ATP Tour level tournament came at the 1996 Gerry Weber Open in Halle where he partnered Pat Cash in the doubles. He also featured twice in the singles event at Halle, as a wildcard in 1997 and a qualifier in 1998, for a first round exit in each. On the second occasion, the 1998 Gerry Weber Open, he took world number 27 Jan Siemerink to a final set tiebreak. From 1998 to 2001 he competed in the men's doubles at Halle every year. He was a quarter-finalist three times, twice with Karsten Braasch and once with Rainer Schüttler.

Stauder, who won six Challenger titles, narrowly missed out on qualifying for the singles draw at the 1999 Wimbledon Championships. In the final qualifying round he had a two set lead over Britain's Jamie Delgado, but the local player came back to win 7–5 in the fifth set.

In 2007, he tested positive for a metabolite of cannabis, from a sample given during qualifying in Halle. The International Tennis Federation ruled that Stauder had "no intent" to "enhance his sporting performance" through taking the drug. As a result, discretion was exercised and he received only a two-month suspension, as well as forfeiting relevant ranking points and prize money.

== Challenger titles ==
=== Doubles: (6) ===
No.	Year	Tournament	Surface	Partner	Opponents	Score
1.	1999	Lübeck, Germany	Carpet	(Germany) Patrick Sommer	(Germany) Michael Kohlmann (Switzerland) Filippo Veglio	6–4, 7–5
2.	2001	Freudenstadt, Germany	Clay	(Germany) Alexander Waske	(Sweden) Fredrik Lovén (South Africa) Damien Roberts	6–3, 4–6, 6–3
3.	2002	Magdeburg, Germany	Carpet	(Ukraine) Orest Tereshchuk	(Belgium) Dick Norman (Netherlands) Djalmar Sistermans	6–4, 6–3
4.	2003	Zell, Germany	Clay	(Germany) Karsten Braasch	(Norway) Jan Frode Andersen (Austria) Oliver Marach	6–3, 4–6, 6–3
5.	2003	Freudenstadt, Germany	Clay	(Germany) Alexander Waske	(Poland) Mariusz Fyrstenberg (Poland) Marcin Matkowski	6–4, 7–5
6.	2003	Aschaffenburg, Germany	Clay	(Germany) Karsten Braasch	(Norway) Jan Frode Andersen (Germany) Philipp Petzschner	6–4, 7–5
