= Paulo Carvallo =

Paraguayan tennis player

- Full name: Paulo Sergio Carvallo
- Country (sports): Paraguay
- Born: 11 July 1976 (age 48); Asunción, Paraguay
- Plays: Right-handed
- Prize money: $19,655

Singles
- Career record: 8–7 (Davis Cup)
- Highest ranking: No. 354 (7 Jun 1999)

Doubles
- Career record: 10–5 (Davis Cup)
- Highest ranking: No. 223 (13 Sep 1999)

Paulo Sergio Carvallo (born 11 July 1976) is a Paraguayan former professional tennis player.

Born in Asunción, Carvallo played in 15 Davis Cup ties for Paraguay, from his debut in 1999. He featured in a World Group play-off tie against the Czech Republic in 2004 and was competitive in his loss to former world number five Jiří Novák, claiming the first set. This was his final Davis Cup appearance until 2010, when he played a one-off tie before retirement. He won a total of eight singles and ten doubles rubbers for Paraguay.

While competing on the professional tour he reached a career high singles ranking of 354. He won three singles and nine doubles titles on the ITF Circuit. On the ATP Challenger Tour, he played and lost in three doubles finals.

Carvallo represented Paraguay at the 2003 Pan American Games in Santo Domingo.
