= Leun =

- Town
- Coat of arms

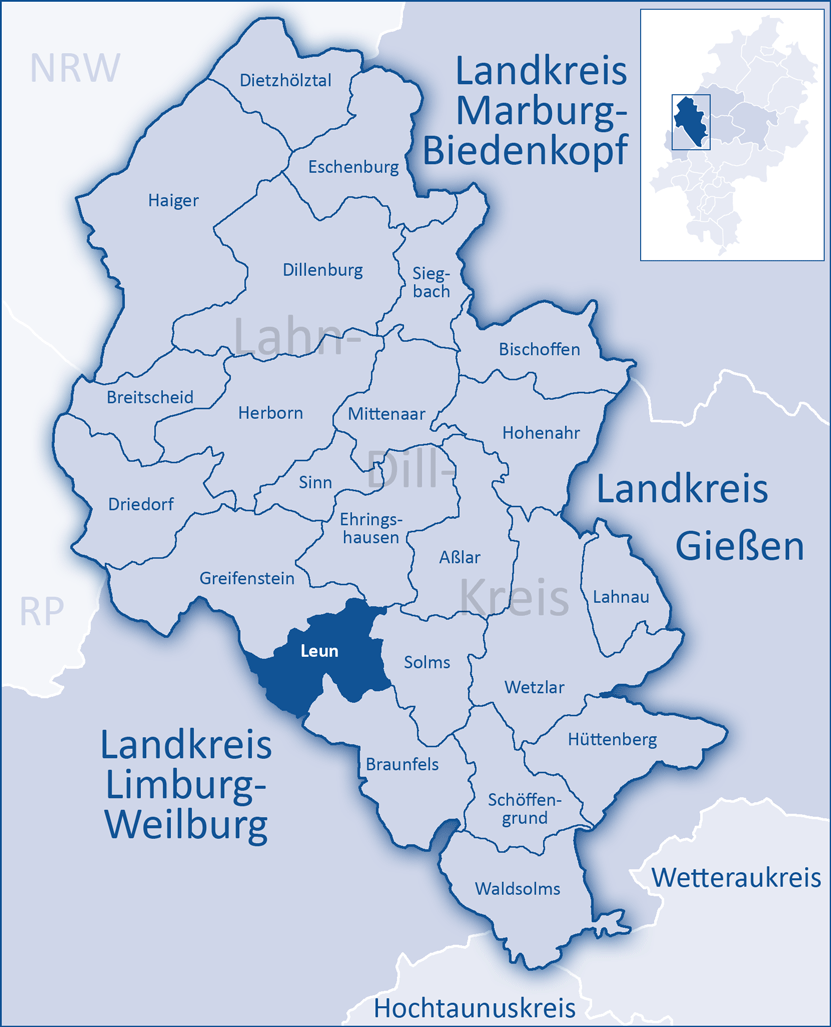
- Location of Leun within Lahn-Dill-Kreis district
- Interactive map of Leun
- Location within Germany Location within Hesse
- Coordinates: 50°33′N 08°22′E
- Country: Germany
- State: Hesse
- Admin. region: Gießen
- District: Lahn-Dill-Kreis

Government
  - Mayor (2017–23): Björn Hartmann (CDU)

Area
  - Total: 28.66 km^{2} (11.07 sq mi)
- Elevation: 155 m (509 ft)

Population (2025-12-31)
  - Total: 5,712
  - Density: 199.3/km^{2} (516.2/sq mi)
- Time zone: UTC+01:00 (CET)
  - Summer (DST): UTC+02:00 (CEST)
- Postal codes: 35638
- Dialling codes: 06473
- Vehicle registration: LDK
- Website: www.leun.de

Leun (German pronunciation: [lɔʏn]) is a small town in the Lahn-Dill-Kreis in Hesse, Germany.

== Geography ==
=== Location ===
Leun lies some 10 km west of Wetzlar between the foothills of the northern Taunus and the Westerwald in the Lahn valley, at a height of 150 to 330 m above sea level.

=== Neighbouring communities ===
Leun borders in the north on the communities of Greifenstein and Ehringshausen, in the east on the town of Solms, in the south on the town of Braunfels (all in the Lahn-Dill-Kreis) and in the west on the community of Löhnberg (Limburg-Weilburg).

=== Constituent communities ===
The town consists of the five centres of Biskirchen, Bissenberg, Lahnbahnhof, Leun and Stockhausen.

== History ==
Leun had its first documentary mention in 771. Building a stone bridge in the late 15th century and being granted market rights helped the village's economic growth, which in 1664 resulted in town rights being granted.

As part of Hesse's municipal reform, the new, bigger town of Leun came into being when the main town of Leun and the other aforesaid communities voluntarily joined together on 1 January 1972.

== Politics ==
=== Town council ===
The municipal elections on 6 March 2016 yielded the following results:

SPD	8 seats
CDU	8 seats
FWG	3 seats
Greens	3 seats
NPD	3 seats

Note: FWG is a citizens' coalition.

== Partnerships ==
The town of Leun maintains partnerships with the following places:

- (France) Feytiat in the département of Haute-Vienne since 1980
- (Germany) Rastenberg, Thuringia since 1990

== Sightseeing ==
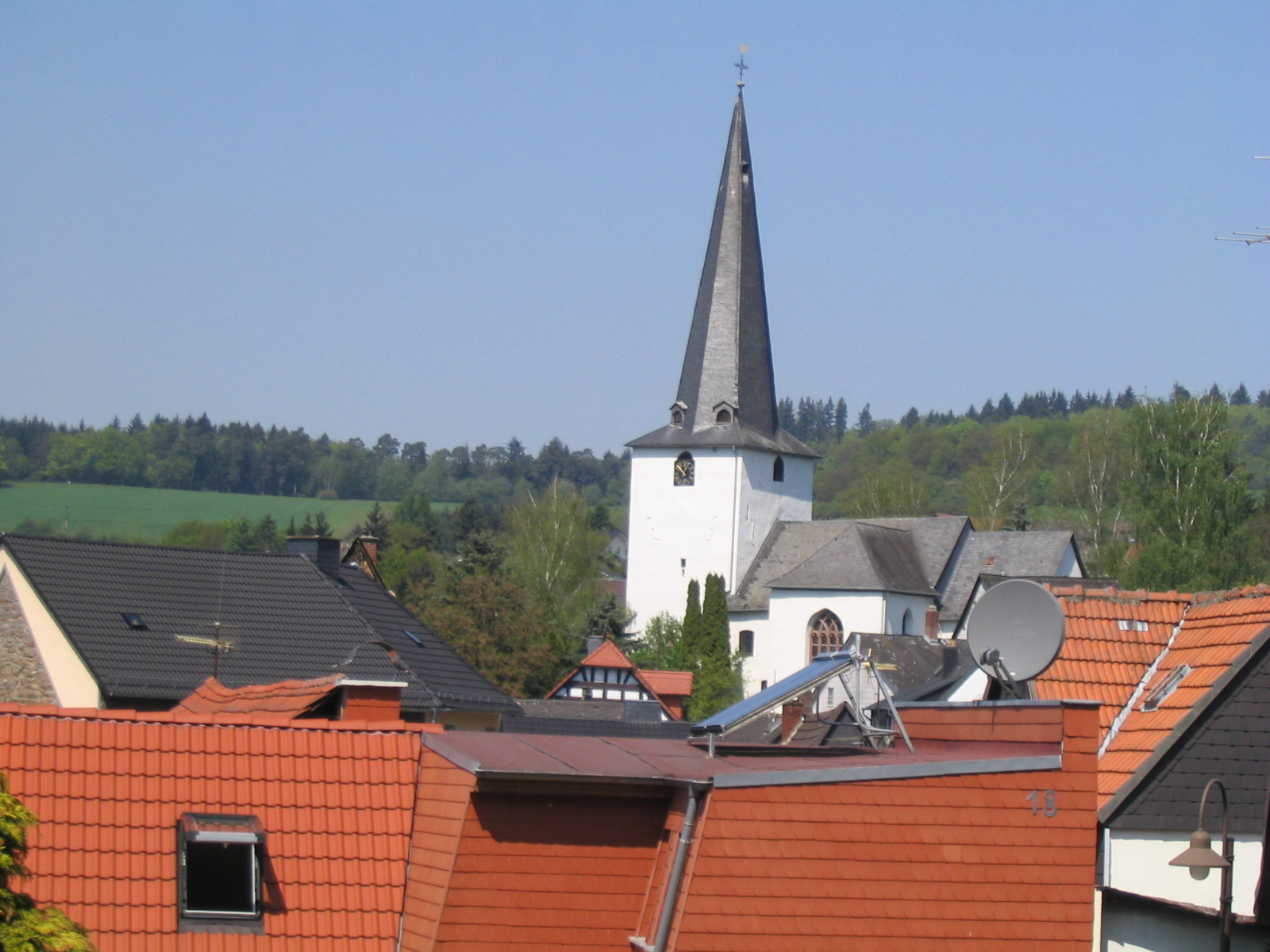
Evangelical Church in Leun seen from the Dollberg

=== Evangelical Church ===
In the historic main town of Leun stands the Evangelical Church, whose exact building date is unknown. The mighty "defensive" tower and the main nave are Romanesque, whereas the sanctuary's and transept's origins are early and late Gothic respectively.

Within the church is an old and, in terms of art history, meaningful, wooden pulpit with panelling showing Southwest Asian motifs. In the transept stands the organ built in 1808 by the brothers Philipp Heinrich and Johann Georg Bürgy. It has 13 stops on one manual keyboard, and a pedalboard. In the tower hang three bells, none of which comes from the bellmaker's that originally did business in the town.

Up from the church lies the graveyard in which can be found remains of the old town wall and the old Upper Gate.

=== Historic town core ===
The town core still has a few stately timber-frame houses that bear witness to the town's bygone wealth. In one is housed the town museum. The best known among them is the Erkerhaus ("Bay Window House") on Limburger Straße, which nowadays is counted among the town's landmarks. At the great Baroque porch into the yard, the remains of the former Junkernhof (see Junker) can be recognized, seat of the family Mohr, with a still preserved manor house. Also worth seeing are the old mill and the old Latin school.

=== Biskirchen ===
In the constituent community of Biskirchen are the ruins of the old Bischofskirche (Bishop's Church), and a well house housing the healing spring that appears here.

=== Natural monuments ===
In the northern forest is the Leuner Burg, but although "Burg" means "castle", it is actually a former quarry which is now considered a natural monument.

== Sport ==
Leun is where the regular tennis tournament called the Leun Open is held.

== Transport ==
Leun lies on Federal Highway (Bundesstraße) 49.

To the north, by way of Ehringshausen, is an interchange with the Autobahn A 45.

Within Leun's municipal area are found two railway stations, Leun/Braunfels (in the constituent community of Lahnbahnhof) and Stockhausen on the Lahntal railway (Lahntalbahn) running from Gießen through Limburg to Koblenz.

== Notable residents ==
- Harald Turner (1891–1947), German Nazi SS commander executed for war crimes
