= Patrick Sommer =

German former professional tennis player

- Country (sports): Germany
- Born: 10 September 1976 (age 48); Neu-Ulm, West Germany
- Prize money: $12,038

Singles
- Highest ranking: No. 560 (10 Aug 1998)

Doubles
- Highest ranking: No. 219 (21 Jun 1999)

Patrick Sommer (born 10 September 1976) is a German former professional tennis player.

Born in Neu-Ulm, Sommer reached a career high singles world ranking of 560. He had a best ranking of 219 in doubles and as a doubles player won an ATP Challenger tournament in Lübeck in 1999, partnering Franz Stauder.

== Challenger/Futures titles ==
Legend
ATP Challenger (1)
ITF Futures (3)

=== Doubles ===
| No. | Date | Tournament | Tier | Surface | Partner | Opponents | Score |
|---|---|---|---|---|---|---|---|
| 1. | Jul 1998 | Greece F6, Veria | Futures | Hard | (Germany) Markus Menzler | (Israel) Michael Kogan (Israel) Andy Ram | 6–0, 6–4 |
| 2. | Jul 1998 | Austria F6, Bergheim | Futures | Clay | (Germany) Markus Wislsperger | (Germany) Lars Rehmann (Germany) Ullrich-Jasper Seetzen | 6–4, 6–4 |
| 1. | Feb 1999 | Lübeck Challenger; Lübeck, Germany | Challenger | Carpet | (Germany) Franz Stauder | (Germany) Michael Kohlmann (Switzerland) Filippo Veglio | 6–4, 7–5 |
| 3. | May 1999 | Germany F1, Esslingen | Futures | Clay | (Germany) Franz Stauder | (Spain) Juan Gisbert Schultze (Spain) Jordi Mas | 6–2, 4–6, 6–4 |
