= Massimo Ardinghi =

Italian tennis player

- Country (sports): Italy
- Born: 6 March 1971 (age 54); Genova, Italy
- Height: 1.75 m (5 ft 9 in)
- Prize money: $164,274

Singles
- Career record: 1–4
- Highest ranking: No. 194 (6 July 1992)

Doubles
- Career record: 18–30
- Highest ranking: No. 111 (28 September 1998)

Grand Slam doubles results
- Australian Open: 1R (1999)
- Wimbledon: 2R (1996)

Massimo Ardinghi (born 6 March 1971) is a former professional tennis player from Italy.

Ardinghi enjoyed most of his professional tour tennis success while playing doubles. During his career he finished runner-up at 2 doubles events. He achieved a career-high doubles ranking of world No. 111 in 1998.

== ATP Tour career finals ==
=== Doubles (2 runners-up) ===
Result	W–L	Date	Tournament	Surface	Partner	Opponents	Score
Loss	0–1	Jun 1991	Genova, Italy	Clay	(Italy) Massimo Boscatto	(Spain) Marcos Aurelio Gorriz (Venezuela) Alfonso Mora	7–5, 5–7, 3–6
Loss	0–2	Mar 1999	Casablanca, Morocco	Clay	(Italy) Vincenzo Santopadre	(Brazil) Fernando Meligeni (Brazil) Jaime Oncins	2–6, 3–6
