= Grenelefe, Florida =

- Census-designated place
- Location within Florida Location within the United States
- Coordinates: 28°03′29″N 81°33′14″W
- Country: United States
- State: Florida
- County: Polk

Area
  - Total: 4.33 sq mi (11.22 km^{2})
  - Land: 4.25 sq mi (11.01 km^{2})
  - Water: 0.085 sq mi (0.22 km^{2})
- Elevation: 79 ft (24 m)

Population (2020)
  - Total: 2,495
  - Density: 587.2/sq mi (226.71/km^{2})
- Time zone: UTC-5 (Eastern (EST))
  - Summer (DST): UTC-4 (EDT)
- ZIP code: 33844
- Area code: 863
- GNIS feature ID: 2583350

Grenelefe is an unincorporated community and census-designated place located in Polk County, Florida, United States. Its population was 2,495 as of the 2020 census.

== Geography ==
According to the U.S. Census Bureau, the community has an area of 4.341 square miles (11.24 km^{2}); 4.029 square miles (10.44 km^{2}) of its area is land, and 0.312 square miles (0.81 km^{2}) is water.

== Demographics ==
Historical population
Census	Pop.	Note	%±
2020	2,495		—
U.S. Decennial Census

Grenelefe first appeared as a census designated place in the 2010 U.S. census.

=== 2020 census ===
As of the 2020 census, Grenelefe had a population of 2,495. The median age was 43.9 years. 18.0% of residents were under the age of 18 and 22.0% of residents were 65 years of age or older. For every 100 females there were 93.6 males, and for every 100 females age 18 and over there were 93.2 males age 18 and over.

0.0% of residents lived in urban areas, while 100.0% lived in rural areas.

There were 1,073 households in Grenelefe, of which 25.0% had children under the age of 18 living in them. Of all households, 49.6% were married-couple households, 18.9% were households with a male householder and no spouse or partner present, and 24.3% were households with a female householder and no spouse or partner present. About 25.3% of all households were made up of individuals and 10.4% had someone living alone who was 65 years of age or older.

There were 1,378 housing units, of which 22.1% were vacant. The homeowner vacancy rate was 1.3% and the rental vacancy rate was 15.8%.

Racial composition as of the 2020 census
Race	Number	Percent
White	1,481	59.4%
Black or African American	302	12.1%
American Indian and Alaska Native	14	0.6%
Asian	23	0.9%
Native Hawaiian and Other Pacific Islander	4	0.2%
Some other race	218	8.7%
Two or more races	453	18.2%
Hispanic or Latino (of any race)	714	28.6%
