= Tom Spinks =

British tennis player

- Full name: Tom Spinks
- Country (sports): Great Britain
- Born: 11 July 1975 (age 49); Norfolk, England
- Plays: Right-handed
- Prize money: $61,253

Singles
- Career record: 0–1
- Career titles: 0
- Highest ranking: No. 422 (3 April 2000)

Grand Slam singles results
- Wimbledon: 1R (1999)

Doubles
- Career record: 1–6
- Career titles: 0
- Highest ranking: No. 237 (5 October 1998)

Grand Slam doubles results
- Wimbledon: 2R (1996)

Tom Spinks (born 11 July 1975) is a British former professional tennis player.

== Biography ==
Spinks, a right-handed player from Norfolk, was the highest ranked player to compete at the 1999 Wimbledon Championships, after receiving entry to the main draw as a wildcard. He lost in the first round to Switzerland's Lorenzo Manta in a two-hour and 42 minute long four-set match. Spinks came from 2–5 down to claim the first set in a tiebreak, then lost further tiebreaks in the next two sets, before the Swiss player took the fourth 6–2.

As a doubles player, Spinks played in three editions of Wimbledon, with a best result the second round in 1996, with Ross Matheson. He also appeared twice in the doubles at the Bournemouth International and once at the Nottingham Open. In 2000 he partnered with Martin Hromec to win the Kyoto Challenger.

== Challenger titles ==
=== Doubles: (1) ===
No.	Year	Tournament	Surface	Partner	Opponents	Score
1.	2000	Kyoto, Japan	Carpet	(Slovakia) Martin Hromec	(Japan) Yaoki Ishii (Japan) Satoshi Iwabuchi	6–4, 7–6^{(5)}
