= Markus Menzler =

German tennis player

- Country (sports): Germany
- Born: 25 July 1977 (age 47)
- Plays: Right-handed
- Prize money: $25,141

Singles
- Career record: 0–1
- Highest ranking: No. 385 (12 Jul 1999)

Doubles
- Highest ranking: No. 314 (14 Sep 1998)

Markus Menzler (born 25 July 1977) is a German former professional tennis player.

Menzler reached a best singles world ranking of 385 and made an ATP Tour main draw appearance at the 1999 Heineken Trophy in s-Hertogenbosch, where he lost his first round match to sixth seed Jonas Björkman.

Now working as a coach in Herford, Menzler is married to former WTA Tour player Kirstin Freye.

== ITF Futures titles ==
=== Doubles: (7) ===
No.	Date	Tournament	Surface	Partner	Opponents	Score
1.	Feb 1998	Austria F2, Bergheim	Carpet	(Germany) Markus Wislsperger	(France) Julien Boutter (France) Jean-Michel Pequery	4–6, 6–1, 6–0
2.	May 1998	Germany F5, Schwäbisch Hall	Clay	(Germany) Markus Wislsperger	(Hungary) Kornél Bardóczky (Hungary) Tamás György	6–4, 3–6, 7–6
3.	Jul 1998	Greece F6, Veria	Hard	(Germany) Patrick Sommer	(Israel) Michael Kogan (Israel) Andy Ram	6–0, 6–4
4.	Aug 1998	Italy F12, Gardone Val Trompia	Clay	(Germany) Markus Wislsperger	(Argentina) Leonardo Olguín (Argentina) Miguel Pastura	7–6, 5–7, 6–3
5.	May 1999	Greece F2, Filippiada	Hard	(Germany) Jan-Ralph Brandt	(Belgium) Gilles Elseneer (Israel) Eyal Erlich	6–7, 6–4, 6–4
6.	May 1999	Greece F3, Ioannina	Hard	(Germany) Jan-Ralph Brandt	(Greece) Konstantinos Economidis (Greece) Nikos Rovas	6–2, 6–2
7.	Jun 1999	Canada F2, Montreal	Hard	(Germany) Jan Boruszewski	(United States) Wynn Criswell (South Africa) Louis Vosloo	6–7, 6–4, 6–3
