= Stefano Tarallo =

Italian tennis player

- Full name: Stefano Tarallo
- Country (sports): Italy
- Born: 8 March 1976 (age 49); Rome, Italy
- Height: 1.85 m (6 ft 1 in)
- Plays: Right-handed
- Prize money: $71,544

Singles
- Career record: 1–1
- Highest ranking: No. 147 (2 October 2000)

Doubles
- Career record: 0–2
- Highest ranking: No. 266 (1 May 2000)

Stefano Tarallo (born 8 March 1976) is a former professional tennis player from Italy.

== Biography ==
A right-handed player from Rome, Tarallo turned professional in 1996.

He reached his career best singles ranking of 147 in 2000, a year in which he won three titles on the Challenger circuit.

At the Palermo ATP Tour tournament in 2000 he received a wildcard into the main draw and made the round of 16, with a first-round win over Federico Luzzi, who he partnered with in the doubles.

In 2001 he featured in the qualifying draws for the Australian Open and French Open.

== Challenger titles ==
=== Singles: (3) ===
No.	Date	Tournament	Surface	Opponent	Score
1.	9 July 2000	Sassuolo, Italy	Clay	(Spain) Álex Calatrava	7–6^{5}, 3–6, 7–6^{4}
2.	27 August 2000	Manerbio, Italy	Clay	(Belgium) Kris Goossens	6–3, 6–4
3.	10 September 2000	Sofia, Bulgaria	Clay	(Italy) Stefano Galvani	6–1, 6–2
