= Mitty Arnold =

American tennis player

- Full name: Milton Higgins Arnold
- Country (sports): United States
- Born: July 15, 1974 (age 52)
- Prize money: $14,117

Singles
- Highest ranking: No. 491 (Oct 11, 1999)

Doubles
- Career record: 0–3
- Highest ranking: No. 268 (Jul 10, 2000)

Milton Higgins Arnold (born July 15, 1974) is an American former professional tennis player.

Raised in Providence, Rhode Island, Arnold attended Milton Academy in neighbouring Massachusetts and first played tennis at the age of eight. He is a 1997 graduate of Harvard University.

Arnold was named on the Ivy League First Team for doubles in each of his four seasons at Harvard (1994-1997). As a senior in 1997 he and partner Thomas Blake earned All-American honors, reaching the NCAA doubles semi-finals.

While competing on the professional tour, Arnold had career best rankings of 491 in singles and 268 in doubles.

Arnold made three doubles main draw appearances at the ATP Tour tournament in Newport.

== ITF Futures titles ==
=== Singles: (1) ===
No.	Date	Tournament	Surface	Opponent	Score
1.	Oct 1999	Sweden F2, Gothenburg	Hard	(Sweden) Marcus Sarstrand	6–4, 6–3

=== Doubles: (3) ===
No.	Date	Tournament	Surface	Partner	Opponents	Score
1.	Sep 1998	Sweden F1, Gothenburg	Hard	(United States) Todd Meringoff	(Sweden) Joel Christensen (Sweden) Robert Lindstedt	4–6, 6–4, 6–3
2.	Sep 1999	Norway F1, Oslo	Carpet	(United States) Thomas Blake	(Sweden) Henrik Andersson (Sweden) Johan Settergren	6–2, 7–6
3.	Oct 1999	Sweden F2, Gothenburg	Hard	(United States) Thomas Blake	(Sweden) Robert Lindstedt (Sweden) Fredrik Lovén	1–6, 7–6, 7–5
