= Damián Furmanski =

Argentine tennis player

- Full name: Damián Furmanski
- Country (sports): Argentina
- Born: 5 October 1975 (age 49)
- Prize money: $78,999

Singles
- Highest ranking: No. 198 (24 April 2000)

Doubles
- Career record: 0–1
- Highest ranking: No. 231 (18 August 1997)

Damián Furmanski (born 5 October 1975) is a former professional tennis player from Argentina.

== Biography ==
Furmanski began competing on tour in the early 1990s. He represented Argentina at the 1993 Maccabiah Games in Israel.

As a professional player he competed mostly on the Futures and Challenger circuits. His only main draw appearance on the ATP Tour came in the doubles at the 1997 U.S. Pro Tennis Championships in Boston, where he and partner José Frontera featured as lucky losers from qualifying. In 1999 he won the Mexico City Challenger doubles title partnering Gastón Etlis. He reached his best singles ranking of 198 in the world in 2000.

After retiring from the tour in 2002, Furmanski moved to Dallas, Texas to launch a tennis academy.

== Challenger titles ==
=== Doubles: (1) ===
No.	Year	Tournament	Surface	Partner	Opponents	Score
1.	1999	Mexico City, Mexico	Clay	(Argentina) Gaston Etlis	(Brazil) Paolo Taicher (Argentina) Andy Zingman	6–4, 6–3
