= Kalle Flygt =

Swedish tennis player

- Full name: Kalle Flygt
- Country (sports): Sweden
- Born: 15 June 1976 (age 48)
- Prize money: $85,350

Singles
- Career record: 2–3
- Career titles: 0
- Highest ranking: No. 250 (21 September 1998)

Grand Slam singles results
- Australian Open: Q2 (2002)
- Wimbledon: Q2 (1998)

Doubles
- Career record: 2–3
- Career titles: 0
- Highest ranking: No. 235 (19 August 1996)

Kalle Flygt (born 15 June 1976) is a former professional tennis player from Sweden.

== Biography ==
Flygt, who comes from Uppsala, made his earliest ATP Tour appearances in doubles, at Båstad in 1995 and 1996.

He played singles at the 1998 Japan Open Tennis Championships where he was beaten in the first round by Brian MacPhie. When he returned to the Tokyo event in 2000 he was more successful, with wins over 11th seed Mariano Zabaleta and Brazil's André Sá, before being eliminated by Byron Black in the round of 16.

In 2001 he competed in the main singles draw at Båstad and was runner-up in the doubles at a Challenger tournament in Brasov.
