= Olivier Malcor =

French tennis player

- Full name: Olivier Malcor
- Country (sports): France
- Born: 28 January 1975 (age 50); Falaise, France
- Height: 5 ft 11 in (180 cm)
- Plays: Right-handed
- Prize money: $82,160

Singles
- Career record: 0–3
- Highest ranking: No. 161 (10 April 2000)

Doubles
- Highest ranking: No. 476 (2 October 1995)

Olivier Malcor (born 28 January 1975) is a former professional tennis player from France.

== Biography ==
Born in Falaise, Malcor was a right-handed player who turned professional in 1994. He had a career best ranking of 161 and competed in the qualifying draw of all four grand slam tournaments. His biggest title win came at the Ostend Challenger in 1999, beating Álex López Morón in the final. He qualified for the main draw of three ATP Tour tournaments, the 1999 U.S. Men's Clay Court Championships in Orlando, the San Marino Open in 2000 and the 2001 Grand Prix Hassan II in Casablanca.

Malcor is married to former WTA Tour player Sarah Pitkowski.

He has coached several top French players, including Julien Benneteau, Michael Llodra, Nicolas Mahut, Paul-Henri Mathieu and Constant Lestienne.

== Challenger titles ==
=== Singles: (1) ===
No.	Year	Tournament	Surface	Opponent	Score
1.	1999	Ostend, Belgium	Clay	(Spain) Álex López Morón	6–3, 6–1
