= Réginald Willems =

Belgian tennis player

- Full name: Réginald Willems
- Country (sports): Belgium
- Born: 6 September 1977 (age 49) Brussels, Belgium
- Plays: Right-handed
- Prize money: $85,760

Singles
- Career record: 1–1
- Career titles: 0
- Highest ranking: No. 145 (21 August 2000)

Doubles
- Highest ranking: No. 408 (18 May 1998)

Réginald Willems (born 6 September 1977) is a former professional tennis player from Belgium.

== Biography ==
=== Playing career ===
Willems, who comes from Brussels, began competing professionally in 1996.

He had his best year on tour in 2000, when he reached a career high 145 in the world. His only ATP Tour main draw appearance came at the 2000 Grand Prix Hassan II in Casablanca, which he entered as a qualifier. He defeated German Alexander Popp in the first round, then lost in the next round to eventual finalist Sébastien Grosjean. At the 2000 Wimbledon Championships he made the final round of qualifying, where he was beaten in five sets by countryman Olivier Rochus. All three of his Challenger finals came in 2000 and he won his only title at Pozoblanco in Córdoba, Spain.

=== Coaching ===
In late 2008 he replaced Julien Hoferlin as captain of the Belgium Davis Cup team. Willems took charge of a team which had been relegated to the Europe/Africa Zone for the 2009 Davis Cup and was able to return the side to the World Group in his first year, with a 3–2 win over Ukraine in the 2009 Play-offs. They were unable to get past the Czech Republic in the first round of the 2010 Davis Cup, but remained in the World Group with an unlikely play-off win over Australia in Cairns.

He resigned as captain amid discontent in the team following Belgium's first-round World Group loss to Spain in 2011. His selection of the inexperienced Ruben Bemelmans against Rafael Nadal in the second rubber of the tie was met with criticism. Olivier Rochus, who had been expected to play the match, spoke out publicly against the decision by Willems and called the missed opportunity to play Nadal as one of the biggest disappointments of his career. At the same time doubles specialist Dick Norman, who was omitted from the side, called for Belgium to have an impartial coach, noting that Willems is also the personal coach of Rochus and Steve Darcis, who both played in the tie.

From 2011 to 2014 he was the coach of David Goffin, during which time the Belgian rose from outside the top 200 to 42 in the world.

== Challenger titles ==
=== Singles: (1) ===
No.	Year	Tournament	Surface	Opponent	Score
1.	2000	Córdoba, Spain	Hard	(Russia) Denis Golovanov	4–6, 7–5, 7–6^{(4)}
