= Petr Kovačka =

Czech tennis player (born 1971)

- Full name: Petr Kovačka
- Country (sports): Czech Republic
- Born: 23 December 1971 (age 54) Jihlava, Czechoslovakia
- Plays: Right-handed
- Prize money: $59,060

Singles
- Highest ranking: No. 609 (21 August 1995)

Doubles
- Career record: 2–12
- Career titles: 0
- Highest ranking: No. 109 (16 October 2000)

Grand Slam doubles results
- US Open: 1R (2000)

Coaching career (2021)
- Barbora Krejčíková (2021)

Petr Kovačka (born 23 December 1971) is a former professional tennis player from the Czech Republic. He used to coach Barbora Krejčíková.

== Biography ==
Kovačka toured as a doubles specialist and played most of his matches alongside countryman Pavel Kudrnáč. It was partnering Kudrnáč that he qualified for the main draw of the 2000 US Open. They lost in the opening round in straight sets to the Argentine pairing of Gastón Etlis and Sebastián Prieto, the first in a tiebreak and second 4–6. The pair won a total of three Challenger titles together and made the semi-finals of the ATP Tour tournament in San Marino in 2000. He reached his career best doubles ranking in 2000, which was 109 in the world.

His daughters, Alena and Jana, are both tennis players.

== Challenger titles ==
=== Doubles: (3) ===
No.	Year	Tournament	Surface	Partner	Opponents	Score
1.	1999	Prague, Czech Republic	Clay	(Czech Republic) Pavel Kudrnáč	(Czech Republic) Petr Dezort (Czech Republic) Leoš Friedl	6–0, 6–1
2.	2000	Wrocław, Poland	Hard	(Czech Republic) Pavel Kudrnáč	(Canada) Jocelyn Robichaud (United Kingdom) Kyle Spencer	3–6, 7–6^{(6)}, 6–4
3.	2000	Barletta, Italy	Clay	(Czech Republic) Pavel Kudrnáč	(Romania) Dinu Pescariu (Italy) Vincenzo Santopadre	6–7^{(4)}, 6–2, 6–0
