= Igor Gaudi =

Italian tennis player

- Country (sports): Italy
- Residence: Rome
- Born: 10 April 1975 (age 50); Rimini, Italy
- Height: 1.88 m (6 ft 2 in)
- Turned pro: Right-handed
- Plays: 1993
- Prize money: $103,002

Singles
- Career record: 0–3
- Career titles: 0
- Highest ranking: No. 169 (11 October 1999)

Grand Slam singles results
- Wimbledon: 1R (2000)

Doubles
- Career record: 0–2
- Career titles: 0
- Highest ranking: No. 221 (7 April 1997)

Igor Gaudi (born 10 Apr 1975) is a former professional tennis player from Italy.

== Career ==
Gaudi competed in the San Marino three times. In 1995 and 1999 he took part in the singles and in 1999 he played in the doubles, with Giorgio Galimberti. He didn't register a win in any tournament.

After winning his final qualification match over Vincenzo Santopadre, in five sets, Gaudi made it into the main draw of the 2000 Wimbledon Championships, where he was beaten in the opening round by Moroccan Hicham Arazi.

He tested positive for Norandrosterone in early 2003 and was suspended by the Italian Tennis Federation.

== Challenger titles ==
=== Singles: (1) ===
No.	Year	Tournament	Surface	Opponent	Score
1.	1999	Manchester, UK	Grass	(South Africa) Neville Godwin	7–6^{(8–6)}, 6–2

=== Doubles: (2) ===
No.	Year	Tournament	Surface	Partner	Opponents	Score
1.	1995	Merano, Italy]	Clay	(Italy) Cristian Brandi	(Italy) Giorgio Galimberti (Sweden) Federico Rovai	7–6, 6–3
2.	2001	Sofia, Bulgaria	Clay	(Italy) Stefano Galvani	(Spain) Oscar Hernandez (Russia) Dmitry Vlasov	6–4, 6–1
