= Nicolas Kischkewitz =

French tennis player

- Country (sports): France
- Born: 4 April 1974 (age 50)
- Plays: Right-handed
- Prize money: $31,294

Singles
- Career record: 1–1
- Highest ranking: No. 260 (12 June 1995)

Grand Slam singles results
- French Open: Q1 (1995, 1997)
- Wimbledon: Q2 (1996)

Doubles
- Highest ranking: No. 277 (3 August 1998)

Nicolas Kischkewitz (born 4 April 1974) is a French former professional tennis player.

Kischkewitz, a right-handed player from Marseille, was a 1992 French Open junior semi-finalist.

While competing on the professional circuit he reached a best singles ranking of 260. His best ATP Tour performance came as a main draw qualifier at the 1993 Dutch Open, where he had a first round win over world number 61 Horacio de la Peña, then fell to third seed Thomas Muster.
