= Martin Hromec =

Slovak tennis player

- Country (sports): Slovakia
- Born: 9 January 1976 (age 49)
- Prize money: $68,673

Singles
- Career record: 0–0
- Highest ranking: No. 218 (21 October 1996)

Doubles
- Career record: 0–1
- Highest ranking: No. 185 (18 August 1997)

Martin Hromec (born 9 January 1976) is a Slovak professional tennis player. He has competed in the Davis Cup several times and men's doubles tournaments particularly in the mid to late 1990s. In the 1998 Davis Cup he played with Ján Krošlák.
