= Men's World Tennis Tour =

Series of professional tennis tournaments

The Men's World Tennis Tour (formerly ITF Men's Circuit) is a series of professional tennis tournaments held around the world that are organized by World Tennis (formerly the International Tennis Federation). The tour represents the lowest rung of the men's professional tennis ladder. World Tennis tournaments are incorporated into the ATP rankings, enabling young professionals to progress on to the ATP Challenger Tour and ultimately the full ATP Tour. Nearly every professional male player has spent some time on the Men's World Tennis Tour.

== Format ==
Originally, the ITF Men's Circuit consisted of satellite tournaments, each of which took place over four weeks. However, in the late 1990s, the ITF introduced Futures tournaments, allowing for greater flexibility in the organization of the tournaments for national associations, and participation in tournaments for players. Over time, the ratio of Futures tournaments to satellites increased until 2007, when satellites were eliminated.

Futures tournaments allow for players to win career titles and improve their rankings. Futures are held in both singles and doubles and last one week. As of 2017, the prize fund for each tournament is either US$15,000 or US$25,000. Some tournaments also provide housing for participants. Futures usually have sizable qualifying draws, which allow unranked players to enter tournaments and earn ATP ranking points.

In 2019, reforms were made to the circuit, renaming it the ITF World Tennis Tour as a new umbrella name for former Pro Circuit and Junior Circuit tournaments and will serve as the player pathway between the junior game and the elite levels of professional tennis. The launch of the tour is the culmination of a series of ITF reforms designed to support talented junior players in their progression to the senior game, and target the prize money effectively at professional tournaments to enable more players to make a living.

== ATP ranking points ==
Ranking point distribution by seasons listed below.

=== 2018 ===
| Tournament category | W | F | SF | QF | R16 |
|---|---|---|---|---|---|
| Futures 25,000 +H | 35 | 20 | 10 | 4 | 1 |
| Futures 25,000 | 27 | 15 | 8 | 3 | 1 |
| Futures 15,000 +H | 27 | 15 | 8 | 3 | 1 |
| Futures 15,000 | 18 | 10 | 6 | 2 | 1 |

=== 2019 ===
| Tournament category | W | F | SF |
|---|---|---|---|
| M25+H | 5 | 3 | 1 |
| M25 | 3 | 1 | 0 |

=== 2020–2021 ===
| Tournament category | W | F | SF | QF | R16 |
|---|---|---|---|---|---|
| M25 | 20 | 12 | 6 | 3 | 1 |
| M15 | 10 | 6 | 4 | 2 | 1 |

=== 2022–present ===
| Tournament category | W | F | SF | QF | R16 |
|---|---|---|---|---|---|
| M25 | 25 | 16 | 8 | 3 | 1 |
| M15 | 15 | 8 | 4 | 2 | 1 |

== Seasons ==
- 1998 ITF Men's Circuit
- 1999 ITF Men's Circuit
- 2000 ITF Men's Circuit
- 2001 ITF Men's Circuit
- 2002 ITF Men's Circuit
- 2003 ITF Men's Circuit
- 2004 ITF Men's Circuit
- 2005 ITF Men's Circuit
- 2006 ITF Men's Circuit
- 2007 ITF Men's Circuit
- 2008 ITF Men's Circuit
- 2009 ITF Men's Circuit
- 2010 ITF Men's Circuit
- 2011 ITF Men's Circuit
- 2012 ITF Men's Circuit
- 2013 ITF Men's Circuit
- 2014 ITF Men's Circuit
- 2015 ITF Men's Circuit
- 2016 ITF Men's Circuit
- 2017 ITF Men's Circuit
- 2018 ITF Men's Circuit
- 2019 ITF Men's World Tennis Tour
- 2020 ITF Men's World Tennis Tour
- 2021 ITF Men's World Tennis Tour
- 2022 ITF Men's World Tennis Tour
- 2023 ITF Men's World Tennis Tour
- 2024 ITF Men's World Tennis Tour
- 2025 ITF Men's World Tennis Tour
- 2026 ITF Men's World Tennis Tour
