= 2000 French Open – Men's singles qualifying =

Men's singles qualifying
- 2000 French Open

Events
Singles	men	women		boys	girls
Doubles	men	women	mixed	boys	girls
WC Singles	men	women	quad
WC Doubles	men	women	quad
Legends	−45	45+	women

Qualification
Singles	men	women
- French Open

This article displays the qualifying draw for the Men's Singles at the 2000 French Open.

== Seeds ==
1. (Czech Republic) Bohdan Ulihrach (qualified)
2. (Italy) Laurence Tieleman (second round)
3. (Argentina) Agustín Calleri (qualified)
4. (Netherlands) Jan Siemerink (first round)
5. (Switzerland) Lorenzo Manta (first round)
6. (Germany) Jens Knippschild (withdrew)
7. (Spain) Álex López Morón (first round)
8. (Germany) Tomas Behrend (qualifying competition, lucky loser)
9. (Argentina) Gastón Etlis (second round)
10. (Spain) Julián Alonso (first round)
11. (France) Thierry Guardiola (qualified)
12. (Switzerland) Michel Kratochvil (qualified)
13. (Czech Republic) Michal Tabara (first round)
14. (Spain) Joan Balcells (qualified)
15. (Argentina) Federico Browne (qualifying competition, lucky loser)
16. (Sweden) Fredrik Jonsson (first round)
17. (Russia) Andrei Stoliarov (second round)
18. (Netherlands) Peter Wessels (first round)
19. (Spain) Jacobo Díaz (qualified)
20. (Spain) Emilio Benfele Álvarez (first round)
21. (Netherlands) Raemon Sluiter (second round)
22. (Canada) Sébastien Lareau (first round)
23. (India) Leander Paes (first round)
24. (Australia) James Sekulov (second round)
25. (Spain) Álex Calatrava (second round)
26. (United Kingdom) Jamie Delgado (first round)
27. (Spain) Germán Puentes-Alcaniz (second round)
28. (Czech Republic) Petr Kralert (qualifying competition)
29. (South Africa) Marcos Ondruska (second round)
30. (Spain) David Sánchez (qualifying competition)
31. (United States) Cecil Mamiit (first round)
32. (Chile) Fernando González (first round)

== Qualifiers ==
1. (Czech Republic) Bohdan Ulihrach
2. (Argentina) Marcelo Charpentier
3. (Argentina) Agustín Calleri
4. (Spain) Óscar Serrano
5. (France) Nicolas Mahut
6. (Germany) Björn Phau
7. (Argentina) Guillermo Coria
8. (Austria) Werner Eschauer
9. (Hungary) Attila Sávolt
10. (Germany) Christian Vinck
11. (France) Thierry Guardiola
12. (Switzerland) Michel Kratochvil
13. (Spain) Jacobo Díaz
14. (Spain) Joan Balcells
15. (Israel) Harel Levy
16. (France) Éric Prodon

== Lucky losers ==
1. (Germany) Tomas Behrend
2. (Argentina) Federico Browne

== Qualifying draw ==
Key

- Q = Qualifier
- WC = Wild card
- LL = Lucky loser
- Alt = Alternate
- ITF = ITF entry
- PR = Protected ranking
- SR = Special ranking
- SE = Special exempt
- JE = Junior exempt
- JR = Junior Accelerator Programme entrant
- CO = College Accelerator Programme entrant
- NG = Next Gen Accelerator Program entrant
- w/o = Walkover
- r = Retired
- d = Defaulted

=== First qualifier ===
First round
1	(Czech Republic) Bohdan Ulihrach	6	6
(Paraguay) Ramón Delgado	2	0
(Germany) Andy Fahlke	1	6	6
WC	(France) Paul-Henri Mathieu	6	3	2
WC	(France) Rodolphe Gilbert	6	7
(Zimbabwe) Wayne Black	4	5
(Uzbekistan) Vadim Kutsenko	2	6	6
31	(United States) Cecil Mamiit	6	1	3

Second round
1	(Czech Republic) Bohdan Ulihrach	6	6
(Germany) Andy Fahlke	2	2
WC	(France) Rodolphe Gilbert	3	6	5
(Uzbekistan) Vadim Kutsenko	6	2	7

Qualifying competition
1	(Czech Republic) Bohdan Ulihrach	3	6	6
(Uzbekistan) Vadim Kutsenko	6	1	1

=== Second qualifier ===
First round
2	(Italy) Laurence Tieleman	7	7
(Italy) Gianluca Luddi	5	5
(Argentina) Diego Moyano	1	6	2
(Italy) Giorgio Galimberti	6	4	6
(Argentina) Marcelo Charpentier	6	4
PR	(Italy) Marco Meneschincheri	0	1^{r}
(Venezuela) Jimy Szymanski	6
32	(Chile) Fernando González	2^{r}

Second round
2	(Italy) Laurence Tieleman	3	1
(Italy) Giorgio Galimberti	6	6
(Argentina) Marcelo Charpentier	6	6
(Venezuela) Jimy Szymanski	3	0

Qualifying competition
(Italy) Giorgio Galimberti	1	1
(Argentina) Marcelo Charpentier	6	6

=== Third qualifier ===
First round
3	(Argentina) Agustín Calleri	7	6
(Belgium) Réginald Willems	5	2
(Australia) Michael Hill	3	7^{7}	6
(South Africa) Neville Godwin	6	6^{2}	3
(Italy) Vincenzo Santopadre	6	7^{7}
(Canada) Daniel Nestor	4	6^{5}
(New Zealand) Mark Nielsen	3	4
29	(South Africa) Marcos Ondruska	6	6

Second round
3	(Argentina) Agustín Calleri	6	6
(Australia) Michael Hill	1	2
(Italy) Vincenzo Santopadre	7^{7}	6
29	(South Africa) Marcos Ondruska	6^{5}	3

Qualifying competition
3	(Argentina) Agustín Calleri	7	7
(Italy) Vincenzo Santopadre	5	5

=== Fourth qualifier ===
First round
4	(Netherlands) Jan Siemerink	4	6	6
(Spain) Óscar Serrano	6	4	8
(Norway) Jan Frode Andersen	5	6^{5}
(Argentina) Hector Moretti	7	7^{7}
(Belgium) Xavier Malisse	6	7
(United Kingdom) Arvind Parmar	4	5
(United States) Michael Sell	3	4
30	(Spain) David Sánchez	6	6

Second round
(Spain) Óscar Serrano	6	6
(Argentina) Hector Moretti	2	2
(Belgium) Xavier Malisse	4	4
30	(Spain) David Sánchez	6	6

Qualifying competition
(Spain) Óscar Serrano	6	4	6
30	(Spain) David Sánchez	3	6	2

=== Fifth qualifier ===
First round
5	(Switzerland) Lorenzo Manta	6	5	10
WC	(France) Nicolas Mahut	3	7	12
(Italy) Igor Gaudi	4	0
(Spain) Tommy Robredo	6	6
(Italy) Stefano Pescosolido	4	3
(Greece) Vasilis Mazarakis	6	6
(Japan) Satoshi Iwabuchi	2	5
28	(Czech Republic) Petr Kralert	6	7

Second round
WC	(France) Nicolas Mahut	7^{7}	2	6
(Spain) Tommy Robredo	6^{3}	6	1
(Greece) Vasilis Mazarakis	6	3	7
28	(Czech Republic) Petr Kralert	4	6	9

Qualifying competition
WC	(France) Nicolas Mahut	6	6^{4}	6
28	(Czech Republic) Petr Kralert	3	7^{7}	1

=== Sixth qualifier ===
First round
Alt	(Czech Republic) Radomír Vašek	2	3
(Argentina) José Acasuso	6	6
WC	(France) Olivier Patience	7^{8}	4	6
(Brazil) Francisco Costa	6^{6}	6	3
(Germany) Björn Phau	6	6
(Russia) Andrei Cherkasov	1	2
(United States) Bob Bryan	4	4
27	(Spain) Germán Puentes-Alcaniz	6	6

Second round
(Argentina) José Acasuso	2	7	6
WC	(France) Olivier Patience	6	5	2
(Germany) Björn Phau	7	6
27	(Spain) Germán Puentes-Alcaniz	5	0

Qualifying competition
(Argentina) José Acasuso	5	2
(Germany) Björn Phau	7	6

=== Seventh qualifier ===
First round
7	(Spain) Álex López Morón	7	5	3
WC	(Argentina) Guillermo Coria	5	7	6
(Spain) Salvador Navarro	7	6
(Austria) Julian Knowle	5	3
(Peru) Luis Horna	6	7
(Czech Republic) Ota Fukárek	3	5
WC	(France) Rodolphe Cadart	3	5
25	(Spain) Álex Calatrava	6	7

Second round
WC	(Argentina) Guillermo Coria	6	6
(Spain) Salvador Navarro	0	4
(Peru) Luis Horna	7^{7}	6
25	(Spain) Álex Calatrava	6^{3}	3

Qualifying competition
WC	(Argentina) Guillermo Coria	4	6	6
(Peru) Luis Horna	6	0	0

=== Eighth qualifier ===
First round
8	(Germany) Tomas Behrend	6	6
(Argentina) Mariano Hood	4	3
(United States) Hugo Armando	4	1
(Germany) Lars Burgsmüller	6	6
WC	(France) Julien Benneteau	6	6
(Israel) Lior Dahan	1	4
(Austria) Werner Eschauer	6	6
26	(United Kingdom) Jamie Delgado	1	1

Second round
8	(Germany) Tomas Behrend	6^{2}	7^{10}	6
(Germany) Lars Burgsmüller	7^{7}	6^{8}	3
WC	(France) Julien Benneteau	4	2
(Austria) Werner Eschauer	6	6

Qualifying competition
8	(Germany) Tomas Behrend	4	6^{5}
(Austria) Werner Eschauer	6	7^{7}

=== Ninth qualifier ===
First round
9	(Argentina) Gastón Etlis	6	6
(Canada) Frédéric Niemeyer	1	3
(South Africa) Jeff Coetzee	2	2
(Argentina) Sebastián Prieto	6	6
(Hungary) Attila Sávolt	6	6
(Spain) Eduardo Nicolás	2	3
(Belarus) Alexander Shvets	4	4
24	(Australia) James Sekulov	6	6

Second round
9	(Argentina) Gastón Etlis	2	2
(Argentina) Sebastián Prieto	6	6
(Hungary) Attila Sávolt	6	6
24	(Australia) James Sekulov	2	2

Qualifying competition
(Argentina) Sebastián Prieto	4	4
(Hungary) Attila Sávolt	6	6

=== Tenth qualifier ===
First round
10	(Spain) Julián Alonso	3	3
WC	(France) Lionel Roux	6	6
(Germany) Christian Vinck	6	6
(Japan) Gouichi Motomura	3	2
PR	(France) Jean-Baptiste Perlant	1	5
(Romania) Răzvan Sabău	6	7
(Finland) Tuomas Ketola	6	6
23	(India) Leander Paes	3	3

Second round
WC	(France) Lionel Roux	6	6^{3}	4
(Germany) Christian Vinck	3	7^{7}	6
(Romania) Răzvan Sabău	6	5	4
(Finland) Tuomas Ketola	0	7	6

Qualifying competition
(Germany) Christian Vinck	7	6
(Finland) Tuomas Ketola	5	4

=== Eleventh qualifier ===
First round
11	(France) Thierry Guardiola	6	3	6
(United Kingdom) Barry Cowan	4	6	4
(United States) Michael Joyce	4	2
(Uzbekistan) Oleg Ogorodov	6	6
(Germany) Oliver Gross	6	6
(Japan) Yaoki Ishii	3	1
(Czech Republic) Petr Luxa	6	6
22	(Canada) Sébastien Lareau	4	4

Second round
11	(France) Thierry Guardiola	3	6	6
(Uzbekistan) Oleg Ogorodov	6	4	1
(Germany) Oliver Gross	6	7
(Czech Republic) Petr Luxa	4	5

Qualifying competition
11	(France) Thierry Guardiola	6	6
(Germany) Oliver Gross	4	3

=== Twelfth qualifier ===
First round
12	(Switzerland) Michel Kratochvil	7^{7}	6
(Brazil) Daniel Melo	6^{3}	4
(Spain) Albert Montañés	6	7
(Czech Republic) David Miketa	4	5
(Russia) Mikhail Youzhny	1	3
(Belgium) Olivier Rochus	6	6
(Switzerland) Ivo Heuberger	3	2
21	(Netherlands) Raemon Sluiter	6	6

Second round
12	(Switzerland) Michel Kratochvil	6	3	6
(Spain) Albert Montañés	2	6	4
(Belgium) Olivier Rochus	6	6
21	(Netherlands) Raemon Sluiter	4	2

Qualifying competition
12	(Switzerland) Michel Kratochvil	6	6
(Belgium) Olivier Rochus	2	1

=== Thirteenth qualifier ===
First round
13	(Czech Republic) Michal Tabara	6	3	5
(Italy) Mosé Navarra	1	6	7
(France) Olivier Malcor	6	6
(Australia) Todd Woodbridge	1	3
(Israel) Lior Mor	6	6
(Finland) Ville Liukko	2	4
(France) Nicolas Coutelot	7	4	4
19	(Spain) Jacobo Díaz	5	6	6

Second round
(Italy) Mosé Navarra	7
(France) Olivier Malcor	5^{r}
(Israel) Lior Mor	2	1
19	(Spain) Jacobo Díaz	6	6

Qualifying competition
(Italy) Mosé Navarra	1	4
19	(Spain) Jacobo Díaz	6	6

=== Fourteenth qualifier ===
First round
14	(Spain) Joan Balcells	6	4
(Spain) Óscar Burrieza	3	2^{r}
(Greece) Solon Peppas	6	7
(United States) Kevin Kim	4	5
(Italy) Cristiano Caratti	6	6
(Argentina) Damián Furmanski	4	4
PR	(Belgium) Johan Van Herck	7	6^{3}	10
20	(Spain) Emilio Benfele Álvarez	5	7^{7}	8

Second round
14	(Spain) Joan Balcells	6	6
(Greece) Solon Peppas	4	4
(Italy) Cristiano Caratti	1	6^{3}
PR	(Belgium) Johan Van Herck	6	7^{7}

Qualifying competition
14	(Spain) Joan Balcells	6	6^{6}	6
PR	(Belgium) Johan Van Herck	4	7^{8}	2

=== Fifteenth qualifier ===
First round
15	(Argentina) Federico Browne	2	6	8
(The Bahamas) Mark Knowles	6	0	6
(Germany) Michael Kohlmann	3	6	6
(United States) Michael Russell	6	4	3
(Austria) Martin Spöttl	4	6	6
(Spain) Ignacio Truyol	6	3	8
(Israel) Harel Levy	6	6
18	(Netherlands) Peter Wessels	2	4

Second round
15	(Argentina) Federico Browne	6	6
(Germany) Michael Kohlmann	1	4
(Spain) Ignacio Truyol	2	2
(Israel) Harel Levy	6	6

Qualifying competition
15	(Argentina) Federico Browne	4	6	3
(Israel) Harel Levy	6	4	6

=== Sixteenth qualifier ===
First round
16	(Sweden) Fredrik Jonsson	6	2	4
WC	(France) Éric Prodon	4	6	6
(Australia) Dejan Petrovic	4	2
(Belgium) Filip Dewulf	6	6
PR	(South Africa) Justin Bower	7^{8}	6^{2}	2
PR	(Italy) Renzo Furlan	6^{6}	7^{7}	6
(Germany) Axel Pretzsch	5	2
17	(Russia) Andrei Stoliarov	7	6

Second round
WC	(France) Éric Prodon	7^{7}	6
(Belgium) Filip Dewulf	6^{4}	2
PR	(Italy) Renzo Furlan	6	6
17	(Russia) Andrei Stoliarov	3	3

Qualifying competition
WC	(France) Éric Prodon	6	6^{3}	6
PR	(Italy) Renzo Furlan	2	7^{7}	4
