= 2001 Hamburg Masters – Singles =

Singles
- 2001 Hamburg Masters

Final
- Champion: (Spain) Albert Portas
- Runner-up: (Spain) Juan Carlos Ferrero
- Score: 4–6, 6–2, 0–6, 7–6^{(7–5)}, 7–5

Details
- Draw: 64 (3WC/8Q/1LL)
- Seeds: 16

Events
Singles	Doubles
← 2000 ·	Hamburg European Open	· 2002 →

Qualifier Albert Portas defeated Juan Carlos Ferrero in the final, 4–6, 6–2, 0–6, 7–6^{(7–5)}, 7–5 to win the singles tennis title at the 2001 Hamburg European Open.

Gustavo Kuerten was the defending champion, but lost in the first round to Max Mirnyi.

== Seeds ==
A champion seed is indicated in bold text while text in italics indicates the round in which that seed was eliminated.

1. (Brazil) Gustavo Kuerten (first round)
2. (Russia) Marat Safin (second round)
3. (United States) Andre Agassi (second round)
4. (United States) Pete Sampras (first round)
5. (Sweden) Magnus Norman (second round)
6. (Russia) Yevgeny Kafelnikov (first round)
7. (Australia) Lleyton Hewitt (semifinals)
8. (Spain) Juan Carlos Ferrero (final)
9. (United Kingdom) Tim Henman (first round)
10. (Spain) Àlex Corretja (second round)
11. (France) Arnaud Clément (first round)
12. (France) Sébastien Grosjean (third round)
13. (Sweden) Thomas Enqvist (first round)
14. (United States) Jan-Michael Gambill (third round)
15. (Slovakia) Dominik Hrbatý (first round)
16. (Switzerland) Roger Federer (first round)

== Draw ==
=== Key ===
- Q = Qualifier
- WC = Wild card
- LL = Lucky loser
- Alt = Alternate
- ITF = ITF entry
- PR = Protected ranking
- SR = Special ranking
- SE = Special exempt
- JE = Junior exempt
- JR = Junior Accelerator Programme entrant
- CO = College Accelerator Programme entrant
- NG = Next Gen Accelerator Program entrant
- w/o = Walkover
- r = Retired
- d = Defaulted

=== Finals ===
Semifinals
8	(Spain) **Juan Carlos Ferrero**	**6**	**6**
(Spain) Albert Costa	1	2
Q	(Spain) **Albert Portas**	3	**7**	**6**
7	(Australia) Lleyton Hewitt	**6**	5	2

Final
8	(Spain) Juan Carlos Ferrero	**6**	2	**6**	6^{5}	5
Q	(Spain) **Albert Portas**	4	**6**	0	**7^{7}**	**7**

=== Top half ===
==== Section 1 ====
First round
1	(Brazil) G Kuerten	3	**6**	6^{5}
(Belarus) **M Mirnyi**	**6**	3	**7^{7}**
(Germany) D Prinosil	4	4
(Sweden) **T Johansson**	**6**	**6**
(Chile) **M Ríos**	**6**	**6**
(Spain) C Moyá	4	4
WC	(Germany) A Pretzsch	2	5
14	(United States) **J-M Gambill**	**6**	**7**
10	(Spain) **À Corretja**	**6**	**6**
(United Kingdom) G Rusedski	3	4
(Ecuador) **N Lapentti**	**6**	**7^{7}**
(Germany) R Schüttler	4	6^{3}
(Israel) **H Levy**	**6**	**6**
Q	(France) A Dupuis	2	3
Q	(Spain) S Bruguera	**6**	1	4
8	(Spain) **J C Ferrero**	3	**6**	**6**

Second round
(Belarus) M Mirnyi	2	0
(Sweden) **T Johansson**	**6**	**6**
(Chile) M Ríos	3	4
14	(United States) **J-M Gambill**	**6**	**6**
10	(Spain) A Corretja	4	1
(Ecuador) **N Lapentti**	**6**	**6**
(Israel) H Levy	6^{5}	3
8	(Spain) **J C Ferrero**	**7^{7}**	**6**

Third round
(Sweden) **T Johansson**	3	**6**	**6**
14	(United States) J-M Gambill	**6**	4	4
(Ecuador) N Lapentti	4	3
8	(Spain) **J C Ferrero**	**6**	**6**

Quarterfinals
(Sweden) T Johansson	2	2
8	(Spain) **J C Ferrero**	**6**	**6**

==== Section 2 ====
First round
3	(United States) **A Agassi**	**6**	**6**
(Italy) D Sanguinetti	1	4
(France) **F Santoro**	**6**	**6**
(Italy) G Pozzi	1	4
(Germany) **N Kiefer**	**6**	**6**
(Romania) A Pavel	4	4
(United States) **T Martin**	**6**	**7^{7}**
13	(Sweden) T Enqvist	2	6^{5}
11	(France) A Clément	5	2
(Czech Republic) **B Ulihrach**	**7**	**6**
(Spain) F Clavet	3	4
(Spain) **A Costa**	**6**	**6**
(Sweden) A Vinciguerra	5	3
(France) **C Pioline**	**7**	**6**
(France) **N Escudé**	**7**	**7**
6	(Russia) Y Kafelnikov	5	5

Second round
3	(United States) A Agassi	3	**7**	4
(France) **F Santoro**	**6**	5	**6**
(Germany) **N Kiefer**	**6**	**7**
(United States) T Martin	3	5
(Czech Republic) B Ulihrach	**6**	1	1^{r}
(Spain) **A Costa**	4	**6**	2
(France) C Pioline	4	**6**	1
(France) **N Escudé**	**6**	3	**6**

Third round
(France) **F Santoro**	**6**	**6**
(Germany) N Kiefer	3	3
(Spain) **A Costa**	**6**	**6**
(France) N Escudé	3	0

Quarterfinals
(France) F Santoro	1	2
(Spain) **A Costa**	**6**	**6**

=== Bottom half ===
==== Section 3 ====
First round
5	(Sweden) **M Norman**	**6**	**7**
Q	(Switzerland) M Rosset	3	5
(Belarus) V Voltchkov	1	3
Q	(Spain) **A Portas**	**6**	**6**
(Morocco) Y El Aynaoui	6^{7}	6^{1}
Q	(Argentina) **A Calleri**	**7^{9}**	**7^{7}**
(Sweden) J Björkman	2	**6**	0
12	(France) **S Grosjean**	**6**	3	**6**
15	(Slovakia) D Hrbatý	3	2
(Germany) **T Haas**	**6**	**6**
(Morocco) **H Arazi**	**6**	1	**6**
(Netherlands) S Schalken	3	**6**	1
LL	(Spain) **A Martín**	**6**	**6**
(Ukraine) A Medvedev	3	0
(Spain) **Á Calatrava**	6^{3}	**6**	**6**
4	(United States) P Sampras	**7^{7}**	3	4

Second round
5	(Sweden) M Norman	6^{5}	6^{7}
Q	(Spain) **A Portas**	**7^{7}**	**7^{9}**
Q	(Argentina) A Calleri	**6**	5	2
12	(France) **S Grosjean**	3	**7**	**6**
(Germany) T Haas	**6**	6^{8}	5
(Morocco) **H Arazi**	2	**7^{10}**	**7**
LL	(Spain) **A Martín**	**6**	**6**
(Spain) Á Calatrava	3	2

Third round
Q	(Spain) **A Portas**	**6**	4	**6**
12	(France) S Grosjean	3	**6**	2
(Morocco) H Arazi	2	3
LL	(Spain) **A Martín**	**6**	**6**

Quarterfinals
Q	(Spain) **A Portas**	**6**	**6**
LL	(Spain) A Martín	3	2

==== Section 4 ====
First round
7	(Australia) **L Hewitt**	**6**	**6**
Q	(France) A di Pasquale	3	2
(South Africa) W Ferreira	4	**6**	3
(Spain) **F Vicente**	**6**	4	**6**
(Australia) **A Ilie**	4	**7^{7}**	**6**
Q	(Spain) J Balcells	**6**	6^{5}	4
WC	(Germany) **L Burgsmüller**	**6**	**6**
9	(United Kingdom) T Henman	1	4
16	(Switzerland) R Federer	3	4
(Argentina) **F Squillari**	**6**	**6**
Q	(Sweden) M Gustafsson	4	4
(United States) **M Chang**	**6**	**6**
(Argentina) **G Gaudio**	**6**	**6**
(Argentina) M Puerta	2	3
WC	(Germany) J Knippschild	2	4
2	(Russia) **M Safin**	**6**	**6**

Second round
7	(Australia) **L Hewitt**	3	**6**	**6**
(Spain) F Vicente	**6**	2	4
(Australia) **A Ilie**	**6**	**6**
WC	(Germany) L Burgsmüller	3	2
(Argentina) **F Squillari**	**6**	5	**6**
(United States) M Chang	2	**7**	3
(Argentina) **G Gaudio**	**6**	**7^{7}**
2	(Russia) M Safin	0	6^{0}

Third round
7	(Australia) **L Hewitt**	**6**	**7^{7}**
(Australia) A Ilie	2	6^{2}
(Argentina) **F Squillari**	**6**	**6**
(Argentina) G Gaudio	4	3

Quarterfinals
7	(Australia) **L Hewitt**	**6**	**6**
(Argentina) F Squillari	4	2

== Qualifying ==
=== Qualifying seeds ===
1. (Spain) Alberto Martín (qualifying competition, **lucky loser**)
2. (Spain) **Albert Portas (qualified)**
3. (Spain) **Joan Balcells (qualified)**
4. (Australia) Wayne Arthurs (first round)
5. (France) **Arnaud Di Pasquale (qualified)**
6. (Sweden) **Magnus Gustafsson (qualified)**
7. (Switzerland) **Marc Rosset (qualified)**
8. (Switzerland) Michel Kratochvil (first round)
9. (Belgium) Xavier Malisse (qualifying competition)
10. (Belgium) Olivier Rochus (qualifying competition)
11. (Spain) **Sergi Bruguera (qualified)**
12. (Croatia) Ivan Ljubičić (qualifying competition)
13. (Argentina) **Agustín Calleri (qualified)**
14. (Argentina) Mariano Zabaleta (qualifying competition, retired due to an illness)
15. (Spain) Félix Mantilla (qualifying competition)
16. (France) **Antony Dupuis (qualified)**

=== Qualifiers ===
1. (Argentina) **Agustín Calleri**
2. (Spain) **Albert Portas**
3. (Spain) **Joan Balcells**
4. (France) **Antony Dupuis**
5. (France) **Arnaud Di Pasquale**
6. (Sweden) **Magnus Gustafsson**
7. (Switzerland) **Marc Rosset**
8. (Spain) **Sergi Bruguera**

=== Lucky loser ===
1. (Spain) **Alberto Martín** (replaces (Germany) Alexander Popp)

=== Qualifying draw ===
==== First qualifier ====
First round
1	**(Spain) Alberto Martín**	**6**	**6**
WC	(Germany) Philipp Kohlschreiber	3	2
Alt	(Thailand) Paradorn Srichaphan	0	0
13	**(Argentina) Agustín Calleri**	**6**	**6**

Qualifying competition
1	(Spain) Alberto Martín	3	6^{9}
13	**(Argentina) Agustín Calleri**	**6**	**7^{11}**

==== Second qualifier ====
First round
2	**(Spain) Albert Portas**	**6**	**6**
WC	(Germany) Christian Vinck	1	2
(Italy) Andrea Gaudenzi	0	5
14	**(Argentina) Mariano Zabaleta**	**6**	**7**

Qualifying competition
2	**(Spain) Albert Portas**	**6**	3
14	(Argentina) Mariano Zabaleta	3	1^{r}

==== Third qualifier ====
First round
3	**(Spain) Joan Balcells**	**6**	3	**6**
(Czech Republic) Jiří Vaněk	3	**6**	1
(Austria) Stefan Koubek	3	4
9	**(Belgium) Xavier Malisse**	**6**	**6**

Qualifying competition
3	**(Spain) Joan Balcells**	3	**6**	**6**
9	(Belgium) Xavier Malisse	**6**	1	3

==== Fourth qualifier ====
First round
4	(Australia) Wayne Arthurs	6^{7}	**7**	5
Alt	**(Spain) Germán Puentes**	**7^{9}**	5	**7**
(France) Julien Boutter	**6**	3	2
16	**(France) Antony Dupuis**	1	**6**	**6**

Qualifying competition
Alt	(Spain) Germán Puentes	6^{4}	1
16	**(France) Antony Dupuis**	**7^{7}**	**6**

==== Fifth qualifier ====
First round
5	**(France) Arnaud Di Pasquale**	6^{2}	**6**	**6**
(Belgium) Christophe Rochus	**7^{7}**	1	3
(Russia) Andrei Stoliarov	0	1
12	**(Croatia) Ivan Ljubičić**	**6**	**6**

Qualifying competition
5	**(France) Arnaud Di Pasquale**	**6**	**6**
12	(Croatia) Ivan Ljubičić	4	3

==== Sixth qualifier ====
First round
6	**(Sweden) Magnus Gustafsson**	**7**	**6**
(Germany) Daniel Elsner	5	4
WC	(Germany) Andy Fahlke	**6**	4	1
10	**(Belgium) Olivier Rochus**	0	**6**	**6**

Qualifying competition
6	**(Sweden) Magnus Gustafsson**	4	**7^{7}**	**6**
10	(Belgium) Olivier Rochus	**6**	6^{5}	3

==== Seventh qualifier ====
First round
7	**(Switzerland) Marc Rosset**	**6**	**6**
(Spain) Tommy Robredo	2	2
(Austria) Markus Hipfl	4	0
15	**(Spain) Félix Mantilla**	**6**	**6**

Qualifying competition
7	**(Switzerland) Marc Rosset**	**6**	**6**
15	(Spain) Félix Mantilla	3	2

==== Eighth qualifier ====
First round
8	(Switzerland) Michel Kratochvil	**6**	5	1
**(Spain) David Sánchez**	1	**7**	**6**
WC	(Germany) Denis Gremelmayr	2	1
11	**(Spain) Sergi Bruguera**	**6**	**6**

Qualifying competition
(Spain) David Sánchez	3	6^{7}
11	**(Spain) Sergi Bruguera**	**6**	**7^{9}**
