= 2001 Hamburg Masters – Doubles =

Doubles
- 2001 Hamburg Masters

Final
- Champions: (Sweden) Jonas Björkman (Australia) Todd Woodbridge
- Runners-up: (Canada) Daniel Nestor (Australia) Sandon Stolle
- Score: 7–6^{(7–2)}, 3–6, 6–3

Details
- Draw: 32 (6WC/2Q)
- Seeds: 8

Events
Singles	Doubles
← 2000 ·	Hamburg European Open	· 2002 →

Todd Woodbridge and Mark Woodforde were the defending champions but only Woodbridge competed that year with Jonas Björkman.

Björkman and Woodbridge won in the final 7–6^{(7–2)}, 3–6, 6–3 against Daniel Nestor and Sandon Stolle.

== Seeds ==
Champion seeds are indicated in bold text while text in italics indicates the round in which those seeds were eliminated.

1. (Sweden) **Jonas Björkman** / (Australia) **Todd Woodbridge (champions)**
2. (Canada) Daniel Nestor / (Australia) Sandon Stolle (final)
3. (Czech Republic) Jiří Novák / (Czech Republic) David Rikl (first round, retired due to Novák's personal reasons)
4. (Australia) Joshua Eagle / (Australia) Andrew Florent (first round)
5. (South Africa) Wayne Ferreira / (Russia) Yevgeny Kafelnikov (first round, defaulted)
6. (South Africa) Ellis Ferreira / (United States) Jared Palmer (quarterfinals)
7. (Australia) Wayne Arthurs / (Federal Republic of Yugoslavia) Nenad Zimonjić (second round)
8. (South Africa) David Adams / (Argentina) Martín García (second round)

== Draw ==
=== Key ===
- Q = Qualifier
- WC = Wild card
- LL = Lucky loser
- Alt = Alternate
- ITF = ITF entry
- PR = Protected ranking
- SR = Special ranking
- SE = Special exempt
- JE = Junior exempt
- JR = Junior Accelerator Programme entrant
- CO = College Accelerator Programme entrant
- NG = Next Gen Accelerator Program entrant
- w/o = Walkover
- r = Retired
- d = Defaulted

=== Final ===
Final
1	(Sweden) **Jonas Björkman** (Australia) **Todd Woodbridge**	**7^{7}**	3	**6**
2	(Canada) Daniel Nestor (Australia) Sandon Stolle	6^{2}	**6**	3

=== Top half ===
First round
1	(Sweden) **J Björkman** (Australia) **T Woodbridge**	**6**	**7^{8}**
(South Africa) C Haggard (Belgium) T Vanhoudt	4	6^{6}
(Spain) T Carbonell (Australia) M Hill	5	5
(Russia) **A Olhovskiy** (France) **F Santoro**	**7**	**7**
(Argentina) L Arnold (Czech Republic) C Suk	**6**	1	3
(Zimbabwe) **W Black** (Zimbabwe) **K Ullyett**	4	**6**	**6**
WC	(United Kingdom) T Henman (United States) T Martin	3	2
6	(South Africa) **E Ferreira** (United States) **J Palmer**	**6**	**6**
4	(Australia) J Eagle (Australia) A Florent	2	6^{2}
(Brazil) **J Oncins** (Argentina) **D Orsanic**	**6**	**7^{7}**
WC	(Germany) **N Kiefer** (Ecuador) **N Lapentti**	**7^{7}**	**6**
(India) M Bhupathi (India) L Paes	6^{4}	3
(Czech Republic) **P Pála** (Czech Republic) **P Vízner**	**7**	3	**6**
(Germany) J Knippschild (Germany) D Prinosil	5	**6**	2
Q	(Spain) **A Portas** (Spain) **G Puentes**	3
5	(South Africa) W Ferreira (Russia) Y Kafelnikov	4^{d}

Second round
1	(Sweden) **J Björkman** (Australia) **T Woodbridge**	**6**	**7^{7}**
(Russia) A Olhovskiy (France) F Santoro	3	6^{3}
(Zimbabwe) W Black (Zimbabwe) K Ullyett	3	**6**	3
6	(South Africa) **E Ferreira** (United States) **J Palmer**	**6**	4	**6**
(Brazil) **J Oncins** (Argentina) **D Orsanic**	**6**	**7**
WC	(Germany) N Kiefer (Ecuador) N Lapentti	1	5
(Czech Republic) **P Pála** (Czech Republic) **P Vízner**	**6**	**6**
Q	(Spain) A Portas (Spain) G Puentes	2	3

Quarterfinals
1	(Sweden) **J Björkman** (Australia) **T Woodbridge**	**6**	**7^{9}**
6	(South Africa) E Ferreira (United States) J Palmer	3	6^{7}
(Brazil) J Oncins (Argentina) D Orsanic	3	2
(Czech Republic) **P Pála** (Czech Republic) **P Vízner**	**6**	**6**

Semifinals
1	(Sweden) **J Björkman** (Australia) **T Woodbridge**	**6**	**6**
(Czech Republic) P Pála (Czech Republic) P Vízner	3	4

=== Bottom half ===
First round
7	(Australia) **W Arthurs** (Federal Republic of Yugoslavia) **N Zimonjić**	3	**6**	**7^{7}**
WC	(Germany) M Kohlmann (Germany) R Schüttler	**6**	3	6^{4}
(Slovakia) D Hrbatý (United States) J Tarango	5	3
WC	(Germany) **T Haas** (Belarus) **M Mirnyi**	**7**	**6**
(Japan) T Shimada (South Africa) M Wakefield	3	3
(The Bahamas) **M Knowles** (United States) **B MacPhie**	**6**	**6**
(United States) **J-M Gambill** (United States) **S Humphries**	3
3	(Czech Republic) J Novák (Czech Republic) D Rikl	2^{r}
8	(South Africa) **D Adams** (Argentina) **M García**	**6**	**6**
WC	(Germany) K Braasch (Germany) L Burgsmüller	3	2
WC	(Switzerland) M Rosset (Russia) M Safin	0	5
Q	(Sweden) **S Aspelin** (Australia) **A Kratzmann**	**6**	**7**
(United States) **B Bryan** (United States) **M Bryan**	**7**	**6**
(Switzerland) R Federer (United States) A O'Brien	5	3
(Argentina) P Albano (Australia) D Macpherson	6^{1}	3
2	(Canada) **D Nestor** (Australia) **S Stolle**	**7^{7}**	**6**

Second round
7	(Australia) W Arthurs (Federal Republic of Yugoslavia) N Zimonjić	6^{8}	6^{7}
WC	(Germany) **T Haas** (Belarus) **M Mirnyi**	**7^{10}**	**7^{9}**
(The Bahamas) **M Knowles** (United States) **B MacPhie**	**6**	**6**
(United States) J-M Gambill (United States) S Humphries	2	3
8	(South Africa) D Adams (Argentina) M García	6^{8}	3
Q	(Sweden) **S Aspelin** (Australia) **A Kratzmann**	**7^{10}**	**6**
(United States) B Bryan (United States) M Bryan	**7^{7}**	4	4
2	(Canada) **D Nestor** (Australia) **S Stolle**	6^{4}	**6**	**6**

Quarterfinals
WC	(Germany) T Haas (Belarus) M Mirnyi	**6**	4	1
(The Bahamas) **M Knowles** (United States) **B MacPhie**	2	**6**	**6**
Q	(Sweden) S Aspelin (Australia) A Kratzmann	**7^{7}**	4	4
2	(Canada) **D Nestor** (Australia) **S Stolle**	6^{0}	**6**	**6**

Semifinals
(The Bahamas) M Knowles (United States) B MacPhie	3	**6**	6^{7}
2	(Canada) **D Nestor** (Australia) **S Stolle**	**6**	4	**7^{9}**

== Qualifying ==
=== Qualifying seeds ===
1. (South Africa) Marius Barnard / (South Africa) Robbie Koenig (qualifying competition)
2. (Argentina) Mariano Hood / (Argentina) Sebastián Prieto (first round)
3. **(Sweden) Simon Aspelin / (Australia) Andrew Kratzmann (qualified)**
4. **(Spain) Albert Portas / (Spain) Germán Puentes (qualified)**

=== Qualifiers ===
1. **(Sweden) Simon Aspelin / (Australia) Andrew Kratzmann**
2. **(Spain) Albert Portas / (Spain) Germán Puentes**

=== Qualifying draw ===
==== First qualifier ====
First round
1	**(South Africa) Marius Barnard** **(South Africa) Robbie Koenig**	5	**6**	**6**
WC	(Israel) Harel Levy (Netherlands) Sjeng Schalken	**7**	2	2
WC	(France) Arnaud Di Pasquale (France) Nicolas Escudé	1	**6**	5
3	**(Sweden) Simon Aspelin** **(Australia) Andrew Kratzmann**	**6**	3	**7**

Qualifying competition
1	(South Africa) Marius Barnard (South Africa) Robbie Koenig	**6**	6^{9}	5
3	**(Sweden) Simon Aspelin** **(Australia) Andrew Kratzmann**	4	**7^{11}**	**7**

==== Second qualifier ====
First round
2	(Argentina) Mariano Hood (Argentina) Sebastián Prieto	4	3
**(Spain) Joan Balcells** **(Spain) Alberto Martín**	**6**	**6**
WC	(Germany) Andy Fahlke (Thailand) Paradorn Srichaphan	2	2
4	**(Spain) Albert Portas** **(Spain) Germán Puentes**	**6**	**6**

Qualifying competition
(Spain) Joan Balcells (Spain) Alberto Martín	4	6^{6}
4	**(Spain) Albert Portas** **(Spain) Germán Puentes**	**6**	**7^{8}**
