= 2000 Hamburg Masters – Singles =

Singles
- 2000 Hamburg Masters

Final
- Champion: (Brazil) Gustavo Kuerten
- Runner-up: (Russia) Marat Safin
- Score: 6–4, 5–7, 6–4, 5–7, 7–6^{(7–3)}

Details
- Draw: 64 (4WC/8Q)
- Seeds: 16

Events
Singles	Doubles
← 1999 ·	Hamburg European Open	· 2001 →

Gustavo Kuerten defeated Marat Safin in the final, 6–4, 5–7, 6–4, 5–7, 7–6^{(7–3)} to win the singles tennis title at the 2000 Hamburg European Open.

Marcelo Ríos was the defending champion, but was defeated in the semifinals by Safin.

== Seeds ==
A champion seed is indicated in bold text while text in italics indicates the round in which that seed was eliminated.

1. (United States) Pete Sampras (second round)
2. (Russia) Yevgeny Kafelnikov (first round)
3. (Sweden) Magnus Norman (quarterfinals)
4. (France) Cédric Pioline (quarterfinals)
5. (Brazil) **Gustavo Kuerten (champion)**
6. (Ecuador) Nicolás Lapentti (first round)
7. (Sweden) Thomas Enqvist (second round)
8. (United Kingdom) Tim Henman (third round)
9. (Spain) Álex Corretja (third round)
10. (Australia) Lleyton Hewitt (second round)
11. (Australia) Patrick Rafter (first round)
12. (Russia) Marat Safin (final)
13. (Morocco) Younes El Aynaoui (third round)
14. (Slovakia) Dominik Hrbatý (first round)
15. (Spain) Juan Carlos Ferrero (second round)
16. (Germany) Tommy Haas (first round)

== Draw ==
=== Key ===
- Q = Qualifier
- WC = Wild card
- LL = Lucky loser
- Alt = Alternate
- ITF = ITF entry
- PR = Protected ranking
- SR = Special ranking
- SE = Special exempt
- JE = Junior exempt
- JR = Junior Accelerator Programme entrant
- CO = College Accelerator Programme entrant
- NG = Next Gen Accelerator Program entrant
- w/o = Walkover
- r = Retired
- d = Defaulted

=== Finals ===
Semifinals
Q	(Romania) Andrei Pavel	3	3
5	(Brazil) **Gustavo Kuerten**	**6**	**6**
12	(Russia) **Marat Safin**	**7^{10}**	**6**
(Chile) Marcelo Ríos	6^{8}	2

Final
5	(Brazil) **Gustavo Kuerten**	**6**	5	**6**	5	**7^{7}**
12	(Russia) Marat Safin	4	**7**	4	**7**	6^{3}

=== Top half ===
==== Section 1 ====
First round
1	(United States) **P Sampras**	**6**	**7^{7}**
(United States) C Woodruff	4	6^{5}
(France) **A di Pasquale**	**7**	1	**6**
(Czech Republic) S Doseděl	5	**6**	3
Q	(Romania) **A Pavel**	**6**	**6**
(Switzerland) R Federer	4	3
(Spain) C Moyà	**6**	2	6^{5}
15	(Spain) **J C Ferrero**	3	**6**	**7^{7}**
10	(Australia) **L Hewitt**	**6**	**7^{8}**
(Australia) M Philippoussis	4	6^{6}
(Argentina) G Gaudio	3	3
(Argentina) **M Zabaleta**	**6**	**6**
WC	(Germany) M-K Goellner	3	1
(France) **J Golmard**	**6**	**6**
(Morocco) H Arazi	4	5
8	(United Kingdom) **T Henman**	**6**	**7**

Second round
1	(United States) P Sampras	4	4
(France) **A di Pasquale**	**6**	**6**
Q	(Romania) **A Pavel**	**6**	**6**
15	(Spain) J C Ferrero	4	4
10	(Australia) L Hewitt	**7**	3	2
(Argentina) **M Zabaleta**	5	**6**	**6**
(France) J Golmard	**6**	4	1
8	(United Kingdom) **T Henman**	2	**6**	**6**

Third round
(France) A di Pasquale	3	6^{6}
Q	(Romania) **A Pavel**	**6**	**7^{8}**
(Argentina) **M Zabaleta**	**7**	**6**
8	(United Kingdom) T Henman	5	3

Quarterfinals
Q	(Romania) **A Pavel**	**7**	**6**
(Argentina) M Zabaleta	5	4

==== Section 2 ====
First round
3	(Sweden) **M Norman**	**6**	**6**
(Sweden) T Johansson	2	4
WC	(Germany) **R Schüttler**	**6**	3	**6**
(United States) V Spadea	4	**6**	3
Q	(Spain) **A Martín**	**6**	3	**6**
(Czech Republic) D Vacek	4	**6**	1
Q	(France) S Huet	3	**6**	4
13	(Morocco) **Y El Aynaoui**	**6**	3	**6**
11	(Australia) P Rafter	4	5
(South Africa) **W Ferreira**	**6**	**7**
Q	(Australia) **R Fromberg**	**7**	**6**
(Brazil) F Meligeni	5	3
(France) **S Grosjean**	**7**	**7^{7}**
(France) F Santoro	5	6^{2}
(Morocco) K Alami	**7**	2	3
5	(Brazil) **G Kuerten**	5	**6**	**6**

Second round
3	(Sweden) **M Norman**	3	**6**	**6**
WC	(Germany) R Schüttler	**6**	3	1
Q	(Spain) A Martín	3	1
13	(Morocco) **Y El Aynaoui**	**6**	**6**
(South Africa) **W Ferreira**	**6**	3	**7^{7}**
Q	(Australia) R Fromberg	4	**6**	6^{2}
(France) S Grosjean	1	**6**	3
5	(Brazil) **G Kuerten**	**6**	3	**6**

Third round
3	(Sweden) **M Norman**	3	**6**	**6**
13	(Morocco) Y El Aynaoui	**6**	1	4
(South Africa) W Ferreira	1	2
5	(Brazil) **G Kuerten**	**6**	**6**

Quarterfinals
3	(Sweden) M Norman	4	2
5	(Brazil) **G Kuerten**	**6**	**6**

=== Bottom half ===
==== Section 3 ====
First round
6	(Ecuador) N Lapentti	6^{4}	3
(Switzerland) **M Rosset**	**7^{7}**	**6**
Q	(United States) J Tarango	5	**6**	4
(Zimbabwe) **B Black**	**7**	3	**6**
(Spain) **F Mantilla**	**6**	**6**
Q	(Armenia) S Sargsian	3	4
(Spain) Á Costa	6^{3}	6^{1}
12	(Russia) **M Safin**	**7^{7}**	**7^{7}**
14	(Slovakia) D Hrbatý	4	6^{7}
(Ukraine) **A Medvedev**	**6**	**7^{9}**
(United States) M Chang	5	5
Q	(United States) **J-M Gambill**	**7**	**7**
Q	(Romania) A Voinea	3	**7**	4
(Belarus) **M Mirnyi**	**6**	5	**6**
(Czech Republic) J Novák	6^{3}	2
4	(France) **C Pioline**	**7^{7}**	**6**

Second round
(Switzerland) **M Rosset**	**6**	**6**
(Zimbabwe) B Black	3	2
(Spain) F Mantilla	3	0
12	(Russia) **M Safin**	**6**	**6**
(Ukraine) **A Medvedev**	1	**7**	**6**
Q	(United States) J-M Gambill	**6**	5	2
(Belarus) M Mirnyi	6^{5}	3
4	(France) **C Pioline**	**7^{7}**	**6**

Third round
(Switzerland) M Rosset	4	5
12	(Russia) **M Safin**	**6**	**7**
(Ukraine) A Medvedev	**6**	2	3
4	(France) **C Pioline**	4	**6**	**6**

Quarterfinals
12	(Russia) **M Safin**	**7^{7}**	4	**6**
4	(France) C Pioline	6^{4}	**6**	3

==== Section 4 ====
First round
7	(Sweden) **T Enqvist**	**6**	4	**6**
(Slovakia) K Kučera	3	**6**	4
(Spain) **F Clavet**	**6**	**6**
WC	(Germany) D Prinosil	4	2
(Spain) F Vicente	1	1
(United States) **T Martin**	**6**	**6**
(Argentina) F Squillari	3	2
9	(Spain) **Á Corretja**	**6**	**6**
16	(Germany) T Haas	6^{6}	4
WC	(Germany) **M Kohlmann**	**7^{8}**	**6**
(France) N Escudé	4	1
(Chile) **M Ríos**	**6**	**6**
(Argentina) **M Puerta**	**6**	**6**
(Austria) S Koubek	4	2
(Netherlands) **S Schalken**	**6**	**6**
2	(Russia) Y Kafelnikov	4	3

Second round
7	(Sweden) T Enqvist	6^{3}	4
(Spain) **F Clavet**	**7^{7}**	**6**
(United States) T Martin	3	2
9	(Spain) **Á Corretja**	**6**	**6**
WC	(Germany) M Kohlmann	1	0
(Chile) **M Ríos**	**6**	**6**
(Argentina) **M Puerta**	**6**	**6**
(Netherlands) S Schalken	4	4

Third round
(Spain) **F Clavet**	**6**	**6**
9	(Spain) Á Corretja	4	1
(Chile) **M Ríos**	**7^{7}**	**6**
(Argentina) M Puerta	6^{4}	0

Quarterfinals
(Spain) F Clavet	4	3
(Chile) **M Ríos**	**6**	**6**

== Qualifying ==
=== Qualifying seeds ===
1. (France) Arnaud Clément (qualifying competition)
2. (Armenia) **Sargis Sargsian (qualified)**
3. (Australia) **Richard Fromberg (qualified)**
4. (Croatia) Goran Ivanišević (qualifying competition)
5. (United States) **Jeff Tarango (qualified)**
6. (Italy) Andrea Gaudenzi (first round)
7. (Spain) Galo Blanco (first round)
8. (Spain) Albert Portas (qualifying competition)
9. (United States) **Jan-Michael Gambill (qualified)**
10. (Switzerland) George Bastl (qualifying competition)
11. (Spain) **Alberto Martín (qualified)**
12. (Sweden) Magnus Gustafsson (first round)
13. (Romania) **Andrei Pavel (qualified)**
14. (Croatia) Ivan Ljubičić (qualifying competition)
15. (Brazil) André Sá (first round)
16. (Belgium) Christophe Rochus (first round)

=== Qualifiers ===
1. (Romania) **Adrian Voinea**
2. (Armenia) **Sargis Sargsian**
3. (Australia) **Richard Fromberg**
4. (Romania) **Andrei Pavel**
5. (United States) **Jeff Tarango**
6. (Spain) **Alberto Martín**
7. (France) **Stéphane Huet**
8. (United States) **Jan-Michael Gambill**

=== Qualifying draw ===
==== First qualifier ====
First round
1	**(France) Arnaud Clément**	**6**	**6**
(Canada) Daniel Nestor	2	2
**(Romania) Adrian Voinea**	3	**6**	**7^{7}**
15	(Brazil) André Sá	**6**	1	6^{5}

Qualifying competition
1	(France) Arnaud Clément	5	2
**(Romania) Adrian Voinea**	**7**	**6**

==== Second qualifier ====
First round
2	**(Armenia) Sargis Sargsian**	**6**	**6**
(Switzerland) Michel Kratochvil	3	2
**(Germany) Axel Pretzsch**	2	**6**	**6**
16	(Belgium) Christophe Rochus	**6**	4	2

Qualifying competition
2	**(Armenia) Sargis Sargsian**	4	**7**	**6**
(Germany) Axel Pretzsch	**6**	5	0

==== Third qualifier ====
First round
3	**(Australia) Richard Fromberg**	**6**	**6**
WC	(Germany) Philipp Hammer	1	1
(The Bahamas) Mark Knowles	**6**	3	4
14	**(Croatia) Ivan Ljubičić**	4	**6**	**6**

Qualifying competition
3	**(Australia) Richard Fromberg**	**7**	**6**
14	(Croatia) Ivan Ljubičić	5	4

==== Fourth qualifier ====
First round
4	**(Croatia) Goran Ivanišević**	**6**	**6**
WC	(Germany) Volker Neumann	1	1
WC	(Germany) Martin Sinner	3	2
13	**(Romania) Andrei Pavel**	**6**	**6**

Qualifying competition
4	(Croatia) Goran Ivanišević	4	3
13	**(Romania) Andrei Pavel**	**6**	**6**

==== Fifth qualifier ====
First round
5	**(United States) Jeff Tarango**	**6**	**6**
(Germany) Andy Fahlke	4	3
**(France) Cyril Saulnier**	**6**	**6**
12	(Sweden) Magnus Gustafsson	4	2

Qualifying competition
5	**(United States) Jeff Tarango**	**7^{7}**	**6**
(France) Cyril Saulnier	6^{4}	3

==== Sixth qualifier ====
First round
6	(Italy) Andrea Gaudenzi	**6**	5	4
**(Zimbabwe) Wayne Black**	2	**7**	**6**
WC	(Germany) Florian Kunth	1	0
11	**(Spain) Alberto Martín**	**6**	**6**

Qualifying competition
(Zimbabwe) Wayne Black	0	2
11	**(Spain) Alberto Martín**	**6**	**6**

==== Seventh qualifier ====
First round
7	(Spain) Galo Blanco	**6**	1	4
**(France) Stéphane Huet**	4	**6**	**6**
(Australia) Wayne Arthurs	4	4
10	**(Switzerland) George Bastl**	**6**	**6**

Qualifying competition
**(France) Stéphane Huet**	**6**	3	**6**
10	(Switzerland) George Bastl	3	**6**	0

==== Eighth qualifier ====
First round
8	**(Spain) Albert Portas**	**6**	**6**
(Sweden) Fredrik Jonsson	1	3
(Germany) Jens Knippschild	6^{3}	4
9	**(United States) Jan-Michael Gambill**	**7^{7}**	**6**

Qualifying competition
8	(Spain) Albert Portas	3	5
9	**(United States) Jan-Michael Gambill**	**6**	**7**
