= 2000 Hamburg Masters – Doubles =

Tennis tournament

Doubles
- 2000 Hamburg Masters

Final
- Champions: (Australia) Todd Woodbridge (Australia) Mark Woodforde
- Runners-up: (Australia) Wayne Arthurs (Australia) Sandon Stolle
- Score: 6–7^{(4–7)}, 6–4, 6–3

Details
- Draw: 32 (6WC/2Q)
- Seeds: 8

Events
Singles	Doubles
← 1999 ·	Hamburg European Open	· 2001 →

Wayne Arthurs and Andrew Kratzmann were the defending champions, but competed this year with different partners.

Arthurs teamed up with Sandon Stolle and lost in the final 6–7^{(4–7)}, 6–4, 6–3 to tournament winners Todd Woodbridge and Mark Woodforde.

Kratzmann teamed up with Wayne Black and lost in first round to Tomás Carbonell and Donald Johnson.

== Seeds ==
1. (United States) Alex O'Brien / (United States) Jared Palmer (first round)
2. (South Africa) Ellis Ferreira / (United States) Rick Leach (first round)
3. (Australia) Todd Woodbridge / (Australia) Mark Woodforde (champions)
4. (South Africa) David Adams / (South Africa) John-Laffnie de Jager (first round)
5. (Zimbabwe) Byron Black / (South Africa) Piet Norval (second round)
6. (South Africa) Wayne Ferreira / (Russia) Yevgeny Kafelnikov (second round)
7. (Czech Republic) Jiří Novák / (Czech Republic) David Rikl (quarterfinals)
8. (India) Mahesh Bhupathi / (The Bahamas) Mark Knowles (second round)

== Draw ==
=== Key ===
- Q = Qualifier
- WC = Wild card
- LL = Lucky loser
- Alt = Alternate
- ITF = ITF entry
- PR = Protected ranking
- SR = Special ranking
- SE = Special exempt
- JE = Junior exempt
- JR = Junior Accelerator Programme entrant
- CO = College Accelerator Programme entrant
- NG = Next Gen Accelerator Program entrant
- w/o = Walkover
- r = Retired
- d = Defaulted

=== Finals ===
Semifinals
WC	(Australia) Lleyton Hewitt (Australia) Patrick Pafter	4	3
3	(Australia) Todd Woodbridge (Australia) Mark Woodforde	6	6
(Australia) Joshua Eagle (Australia) Andrew Florent	6^{1}	6^{5}
(Australia) Wayne Arthurs (Australia) Sandon Stolle	7^{7}	7^{7}

Final
3	(Australia) Todd Woodbridge (Australia) Mark Woodforde	6^{4}	6	6
(Australia) Wayne Arthurs (Australia) Sandon Stolle	7^{7}	4	3

=== Top half ===
First round
1	(United States) A O'Brien (United States) J Palmer	6	3	6^{6}
WC	(Germany) M-K Goellner (Germany) M Kohlmann	3	6	7^{8}
(Spain) T Carbonell (United States) D Johnson	7	6
(Zimbabwe) W Black (Australia) A Kratzmann	5	2
Q	(Spain) A Martín (Spain) A Portas	5	4
WC	(Australia) L Hewitt (Australia) P Rafter	7	6
WC	(Germany) K Braasch (Germany) D Dier	4	5
8	(India) M Bhupathi (The Bahamas) M Knowles	6	7
3	(Australia) T Woodbridge (Australia) M Woodforde	6	6
(United States) J Tarango (Czech Republic) D Vacek	0	3
WC	(Germany) J Knippschild (Germany) R Schüttler	7^{7}	4	6
(Croatia) G Ivanišević (Germany) D Prinosil	6^{5}	6	2
(Australia) D Macpherson (Sweden) P Nyborg	2	7^{7}	0
(Argentina) L Arnold Ker (Brazil) J Oncins	6	6^{1}	6
(United States) P Galbraith (United States) B MacPhie	5	5
5	(Zimbabwe) B Black (South Africa) P Norval	7	7

Second round
WC	(Germany) M-K Goellner (Germany) M Kohlmann	6	7^{7}
(Spain) T Carbonell (United States) D Johnson	3	6^{3}
WC	(Australia) L Hewitt (Australia) P Rafter	3	6	6
8	(India) M Bhupathi (The Bahamas) M Knowles	6	4	3
3	(Australia) T Woodbridge (Australia) M Woodforde	7	2	6
WC	(Germany) J Knippschild (Germany) R Schüttler	5	6	1
(Argentina) L Arnold Ker (Brazil) J Oncins	6	6
5	(Zimbabwe) B Black (South Africa) P Norval	3	3

Quarterfinals
WC	(Germany) M-K Goellner (Germany) M Kohlmann	2	1
WC	(Australia) L Hewitt (Australia) P Rafter	6	6
3	(Australia) T Woodbridge (Australia) M Woodforde	7	5	6
(Argentina) L Arnold Ker (Brazil) J Oncins	5	7	3

Semifinals
WC	(Australia) L Hewitt (Australia) P Rafter	4	3
3	(Australia) T Woodbridge (Australia) M Woodforde	6	6

=== Bottom half ===
First round
6	(South Africa) W Ferreira (Russia) Y Kafelnikov	6	7
(Sweden) S Aspelin (Sweden) J Landsberg	3	5
(France) O Delaître (France) F Santoro	3	6^{6}
Q	(Switzerland) R Federer (Switzerland) M Rosset	6	7^{8}
(Australia) J Eagle (Australia) A Florent	7^{9}	4	6
WC	(Germany) J-R Brandt (Germany) M Sinner	6^{7}	6	1
(Belarus) M Mirnyi (Canada) D Nestor	6	7^{7}
4	(South Africa) D Adams (South Africa) J-L de Jager	4	6^{1}
7	(Czech Republic) J Novák (Czech Republic) D Rikl	6	6
WC	(Germany) A Fahlke (Croatia) I Ljubičić	2	4
(South Africa) C Haggard (North Macedonia) A Kitinov	0	2
(United States) J-M Gambill (United States) S Humphries	6	6
(South Africa) R Koenig (Russia) A Olhovskiy	2	6	3
(Czech Republic) M Damm (Slovakia) D Hrbatý	6	4	6
(Australia) W Arthurs (Australia) S Stolle	6	6
2	(South Africa) E Ferreira (United States) R Leach	4	4

Second round
6	(South Africa) W Ferreira (Russia) Y Kafelnikov	4	6	3
Q	(Switzerland) R Federer (Switzerland) M Rosset	6	1	6
(Australia) J Eagle (Australia) A Florent	6	2	7^{7}
(Belarus) M Mirnyi (Canada) D Nestor	2	6	6^{4}
7	(Czech Republic) J Novák (Czech Republic) D Rikl	6	6
(United States) J-M Gambill (United States) S Humphries	1	2
(Czech Republic) M Damm (Slovakia) D Hrbatý	6^{5}	4
(Australia) W Arthurs (Australia) S Stolle	7^{7}	6

Quarterfinals
Q	(Switzerland) R Federer (Switzerland) M Rosset	6^{3}	6	6^{5}
(Australia) J Eagle (Australia) A Florent	7^{7}	4	7^{7}
7	(Czech Republic) J Novák (Czech Republic) D Rikl	7	3	4
(Australia) W Arthurs (Australia) S Stolle	5	6	6

Semifinals
(Australia) J Eagle (Australia) A Florent	6^{1}	6^{5}
(Australia) W Arthurs (Australia) S Stolle	7^{7}	7^{7}

== Qualifying ==
=== Qualifying seeds ===
1. (Spain) Juan Ignacio Carrasco / (Spain) Jairo Velasco Jr. (first round)
2. (Brazil) Antonio Prieto / (Czech Republic) Cyril Suk (first round)
3. (Czech Republic) Petr Pála / (Czech Republic) Pavel Vízner (first round)
4. (United States) Devin Bowen / (Romania) Andrei Pavel (qualifying competition)

=== Qualifiers ===
1. (Spain) Alberto Martín / (Spain) Albert Portas
2. (Switzerland) Roger Federer / (Switzerland) Marc Rosset

=== Qualifying draw ===
==== First qualifier ====
First round
1	(Spain) Juan Ignacio Carrasco (Spain) Jairo Velasco Jr.	6	4	1
(Spain) Alberto Martín (Spain) Albert Portas	4	6	6
WC	(France) Arnaud Clément (France) Sébastien Grosjean	3	6	3
4	(United States) Devin Bowen (Romania) Andrei Pavel	6	4	6

Qualifying competition
(Spain) Alberto Martín (Spain) Albert Portas	5	6	6
4	(United States) Devin Bowen (Romania) Andrei Pavel	7	3	3

==== Second qualifier ====
First round
2	(Brazil) Antonio Prieto (Czech Republic) Cyril Suk	4	2
WC	(Slovakia) Karol Kučera (Russia) Marat Safin	6	6
WC	(Switzerland) Roger Federer (Switzerland) Marc Rosset	6	6
3	(Czech Republic) Petr Pála (Czech Republic) Pavel Vízner	3	4

Qualifying competition
WC	(Slovakia) Karol Kučera (Russia) Marat Safin
WC	(Switzerland) Roger Federer (Switzerland) Marc Rosset	w/o
