= 2002 Hamburg Masters – Singles =

Singles
- 2002 Hamburg Masters

Final
- Champion: (Switzerland) Roger Federer
- Runner-up: (Russia) Marat Safin
- Score: 6–1, 6–3, 6–4

Details
- Draw: 64 (4WC/8Q/2LL)
- Seeds: 16

Events
Singles	Doubles
← 2001 ·	Hamburg Masters	· 2003 →

Roger Federer defeated Marat Safin in the final, 6–1, 6–3, 6–4 to win the singles tennis title at the 2002 Hamburg Masters. It was his first Masters title and the first of an eventual 28 Masters titles. With the win, Federer entered the top ten in rankings for the first time.

Albert Portas was the defending champion, but lost in the first round to Björn Phau.

== Seeds ==
A champion seed is indicated in bold text while text in italics indicates the round in which that seed was eliminated.

1. (Australia) Lleyton Hewitt (quarterfinals)
2. (Brazil) Gustavo Kuerten (quarterfinals)
3. (Spain) Juan Carlos Ferrero (first round)
4. (Russia) Yevgeny Kafelnikov (first round)
5. (United Kingdom) Tim Henman (second round)
6. (Russia) Marat Safin (final)
7. (Germany) Tommy Haas (third round)
8. (Sweden) Thomas Johansson (second round)
9. (United States) ~~Andre Agassi~~ (withdrew)
10. (France) Sébastien Grosjean (second round)
11. (Switzerland) **Roger Federer (champion)**
12. (United States) Pete Sampras (first round)
13. (United States) Andy Roddick (third round)
14. (Czech Republic) Jiří Novák (third round)
15. (Argentina) Guillermo Cañas (third round)
16. (Morocco) Younes El Aynaoui (third round)

== Draw ==
=== Key ===
- Q = Qualifier
- WC = Wild card
- LL = Lucky loser
- Alt = Alternate
- SE = Special exempt
- PR = Protected ranking
- ITF = ITF entry
- JE = Junior exempt
- w/o = Walkover
- r = Retired
- d = Defaulted
- SR = Special ranking

=== Finals ===
Quarterfinals
1	(Australia) Lleyton Hewitt	3	1
6	**(Russia) Marat Safin**	**6**	**6**
(Austria) Stefan Koubek	**7^{7}**	3	1
**(Spain) Tommy Robredo**	6^{2}	**6**	**6**
(Belarus) **Max Mirnyi**	**7^{7}**	4	**6**
Q	(France) Julien Boutter	6^{4}	**6**	3
11	**(Switzerland) Roger Federer**	**6**	1	**6**
2	(Brazil) Gustavo Kuerten	0	**6**	2

Semifinals
6	(Russia) **Marat Safin**	**6**	4
(Spain) Tommy Robredo	4	2^{r}
(Belarus) Max Mirnyi	4	4
11	(Switzerland) **Roger Federer**	**6**	**6**

Final
6	(Russia) Marat Safin	1	3	4
11	(Switzerland) **Roger Federer**	**6**	**6**	**6**

=== Top half ===
==== Section 1 ====
First round
1	(Australia) **L Hewitt**	**7**	**6**
WC	(Germany) P Kohlschreiber	5	4
WC	(Germany) **B Phau**	**6**	**6**
(Spain) A Portas	4	2
(Spain) **F Mantilla**	**6**	**7^{7}**
(Sweden) T Enqvist	4	6^{5}
(United States) J Blake	6^{4}	2
14	(Czech Republic) **J Novák**	**7^{7}**	**6**
LL	(Brazil) F Meligeni	2	2
Q	(Spain) **D Sánchez**	**6**	**6**
(Australia) M Philippoussis	4	4
(Argentina) **J I Chela**	**6**	**6**
(Argentina) D Nalbandian	4	3
(Spain) **A Martín**	**6**	**6**
(Italy) D Sanguinetti	3	4
6	(Russia) **M Safin**	**6**	**6**

Second round
1	(Australia) **L Hewitt**	**6**	**6**
WC	(Germany) B Phau	3	3
(Spain) F Mantilla	2	0
14	(Czech Republic) **J Novák**	**6**	**6**
Q	(Spain) D Sánchez	3	**6**	2
(Argentina) **J I Chela**	**6**	1	**6**
(Spain) A Martín	4	2
6	(Russia) **M Safin**	**6**	**6**

Third round
1	(Australia) **L Hewitt**	**6**	**6**
14	(Czech Republic) J Novák	4	3
(Argentina) J I Chela	6^{6}	5
6	(Russia) **M Safin**	**7^{8}**	**7**

Quarterfinals
1	(Australia) L Hewitt	3	1
6	(Russia) **M Safin**	**6**	**6**

==== Section 2 ====
First round
3	(Spain) J C Ferrero	**6**	3	4
(Spain) **A Costa**	2	**6**	**6**
(Austria) **S Koubek**	**7**	**6**
Q	(France) A Dupuis	5	1
(South Africa) **W Ferreira**	4	**7^{7}**	**6**
Q	(Belgium) O Rochus	**6**	6^{0}	4
(France) F Santoro	6^{3}	3
16	(Morocco) **Y El Aynaoui**	**7^{7}**	**6**
10	(France) **S Grosjean**	**6**	**6**
(United States) J-M Gambill	2	2
(Argentina) F Squillari	**6**	2	1
(Spain) **T Robredo**	0	**6**	**6**
(Netherlands) **S Schalken**	**6**	**6**
(Switzerland) M Kratochvil	4	4
WC	(Germany) L Burgsmüller	1	1
7	(Germany) **T Haas**	**6**	**6**

Second round
(Spain) A Costa	5	6^{5}
(Austria) **S Koubek**	**7**	**7^{7}**
(South Africa) W Ferreira	6^{11}	3
16	(Morocco) **Y El Aynaoui**	**7^{13}**	**6**
10	(France) S Grosjean	5	5
(Spain) **T Robredo**	**7**	**7**
(Netherlands) S Schalken	5	3
7	(Germany) **T Haas**	**7**	**6**

Third round
(Austria) **S Koubek**	**7^{8}**	**6**
16	(Morocco) Y El Aynaoui	6^{6}	2
(Spain) **T Robredo**	**6**	**6**
7	(Germany) T Haas	4	4

Quarterfinals
(Austria) S Koubek	**7^{7}**	3	1
(Spain) **T Robredo**	6^{2}	**6**	**6**

=== Bottom half ===
==== Section 3 ====
First round
8	(Sweden) **T Johansson**	6^{2}	**6**	**6**
(Sweden) J Björkman	**7^{7}**	3	3
(France) A Clément	4	4
Q	(Argentina) **M Zabaleta**	**6**	**6**
(Spain) **C Moyá**	**6**	2	**6**
Q	(Russia) M Youzhny	3	**6**	4
(Belarus) **M Mirnyi**	**6**	**6**
12	(United States) P Sampras	3	4
13	(United States) **A Roddick**	**7^{7}**	**6**
(United States) T Martin	6^{4}	2
(Croatia) I Ljubičić	**6**	5	4
(Germany) **R Schüttler**	3	**7**	**6**
Q	(France) **J Boutter**	**7^{7}**	**6**
(Spain) A Montañés	6^{2}	4
(Spain) **À Corretja**	**6**	**6**
4	(Russia) Y Kafelnikov	1	2

Second round
8	(Sweden) T Johansson	4	2
Q	(Argentina) **M Zabaleta**	**6**	**6**
(Spain) C Moyá	6^{6}	6^{3}
(Belarus) **M Mirnyi**	**7^{8}**	**7^{7}**
13	(United States) **A Roddick**	**6**	**6**
(Germany) R Schüttler	4	4
Q	(France) **J Boutter**	5	**7**	**6**
(Spain) À Corretja	**7**	5	2

Third round
Q	(Argentina) M Zabaleta	3	**6**	4
(Belarus) **M Mirnyi**	**6**	2	**6**
13	(United States) A Roddick	3	5
Q	(France) **J Boutter**	**6**	**7**

Quarterfinals
(Belarus) **M Mirnyi**	**7^{7}**	4	**6**
Q	(France) J Boutter	6^{4}	**6**	3

==== Section 4 ====
First round
5	(United Kingdom) **T Henman**	**6**	**6**
(France) N Escudé	4	2
Q	(Romania) **A Voinea**	**7**	**7**
LL	(Hungary) A Sávolt	5	5
(Morocco) H Arazi	3^{r}
(Czech Republic) **B Ulihrach**	4
(Ecuador) N Lapentti	1	4
11	(Switzerland) **R Federer**	**6**	**6**
15	(Argentina) **G Cañas**	**7**	1	**6**
(Belgium) X Malisse	5	**6**	0
(Chile) **F González**	**7**	**6**
WC	(Germany) C Vinck	5	4
Q	(Australia) W Arthurs	4	4
(Romania) **A Pavel**	**6**	**6**
(Germany) N Kiefer	4	5
2	(Brazil) **G Kuerten**	**6**	**7**

Second round
5	(United Kingdom) T Henman	6^{5}	**6**	4
Q	(Romania) **A Voinea**	**7^{7}**	2	**6**
(Czech Republic) B Ulihrach	3	0
11	(Switzerland) **R Federer**	**6**	**6**
15	(Argentina) **G Cañas**	2	**7^{7}**	**6**
(Chile) F González	**6**	6^{0}	0
(Romania) A Pavel	3	6^{5}
2	(Brazil) **G Kuerten**	**6**	**7^{7}**

Third round
Q	(Romania) A Voinea	5	4
11	(Switzerland) **R Federer**	**7**	**6**
15	(Argentina) G Cañas	5	2
2	(Brazil) **G Kuerten**	**7**	**6**

Quarterfinals
11	(Switzerland) **R Federer**	**6**	1	**6**
2	(Brazil) G Kuerten	0	**6**	2

== Qualifying ==
=== Qualifying seeds ===
1. (France) **Julien Boutter (qualified)**
2. (Brazil) Fernando Meligeni (qualifying competition, **Lucky loser**)
3. (Argentina) **Mariano Zabaleta (qualified)**
4. (Romania) **Adrian Voinea (qualified)**
5. (Russia) **Mikhail Youzhny (qualified)**
6. (Thailand) Paradorn Srichaphan (first round)
7. (Belgium) **Olivier Rochus (qualified)**
8. (Hungary) Attila Sávolt (qualifying competition, **Lucky loser**)
9. (Spain) **David Sánchez (qualified)**
10. (Spain) Fernando Vicente (first round)
11. (Slovakia) Karol Kučera (first round)
12. (Belgium) Christophe Rochus (qualifying competition)
13. (Russia) Nikolay Davydenko (qualifying competition, retired due to a knee injury)
14. (Austria) Markus Hipfl (qualifying competition)
15. (France) **Antony Dupuis (qualified)**
16. (United States) Vince Spadea (first round)

=== Qualifiers ===
1. (France) **Julien Boutter**
2. (France) **Antony Dupuis**
3. (Argentina) **Mariano Zabaleta**
4. (Romania) **Adrian Voinea**
5. (Russia) **Mikhail Youzhny**
6. (Australia) **Wayne Arthurs**
7. (Belgium) **Olivier Rochus**
8. (Spain) **David Sánchez**

=== Lucky losers ===
1. (Brazil) **Fernando Meligeni**
2. (Hungary) **Attila Sávolt**

=== Qualifying draw ===
==== First qualifier ====
First round
1	**(France) Julien Boutter**	6^{3}	**6**	**6**
(Switzerland) Marc Rosset	**7^{7}**	1	3
**(United States) Bob Bryan**	**6**	4	**6**
10	(Spain) Fernando Vicente	4	**6**	4

Qualifying competition
1	**(France) Julien Boutter**	**6**	**6**
(United States) Bob Bryan	4	1

==== Second qualifier ====
First round
2	**(Brazil) Fernando Meligeni**	**7^{7}**	**6**
(Sweden) Magnus Larsson	6^{2}	2
(Germany) Markus Hantschk	6^{4}	3
15	**(France) Antony Dupuis**	**7^{7}**	**6**

Qualifying competition
2	(Brazil) Fernando Meligeni	**6**	2	1
15	**(France) Antony Dupuis**	3	**6**	**6**

==== Third qualifier ====
First round
3	**(Argentina) Mariano Zabaleta**	**7**	**6**
(Germany) Michael Kohlmann	5	3
WC	(Germany) Jens Knippschild	3	**6**	1
14	**(Austria) Markus Hipfl**	**6**	1	**6**

Qualifying competition
3	**(Argentina) Mariano Zabaleta**	**6**	4
14	(Austria) Markus Hipfl	2	1^{r}

==== Fourth qualifier ====
First round
4	**(Romania) Adrian Voinea**	**6**	5	**6**
(Greece) Vasilis Mazarakis	4	**7**	2
WC	(Germany) Florian Lemke	3	0
12	**(Belgium) Christophe Rochus**	**6**	**6**

Qualifying competition
4	**(Romania) Adrian Voinea**	**6**	**6**
12	(Belgium) Christophe Rochus	1	1

==== Fifth qualifier ====
First round
5	**(Russia) Mikhail Youzhny**	**6**	**6**
(Argentina) Gastón Etlis	3	2
**(Spain) Galo Blanco**	5	**6**	**6**
16	(United States) Vince Spadea	**7**	4	4

Qualifying competition
5	**(Russia) Mikhail Youzhny**	**6**	**6**
(Spain) Galo Blanco	2	4

==== Sixth qualifier ====
First round
6	(Thailand) Paradorn Srichaphan	4	4
**(Australia) Wayne Arthurs**	**6**	**6**
(United States) Michael Russell	**6**	1	1
13	**(Russia) Nikolay Davydenko**	1	**6**	**6**

Qualifying competition
**(Australia) Wayne Arthurs**	**6**	6
13	(Russia) Nikolay Davydenko	3	6^{r}

==== Seventh qualifier ====
First round
7	**(Belgium) Olivier Rochus**	**6**	**7**
(United States) Taylor Dent	4	5
**(France) Cédric Pioline**	**6**	**6**
11	(Slovakia) Karol Kučera	1	2

Qualifying competition
7	**(Belgium) Olivier Rochus**	**6**	3	**6**
(France) Cédric Pioline	3	**6**	3

==== Eighth qualifier ====
First round
8	**(Hungary) Attila Sávolt**	**6**	**6**
WC	(Germany) Michael Berrer	2	3
WC	(Germany) Philipp Petzschner	2	1
9	**(Spain) David Sánchez**	**6**	**6**

Qualifying competition
8	(Hungary) Attila Sávolt	1	5
9	**(Spain) David Sánchez**	**6**	**7**
