= 2001 Hamburg Masters =

- Date: 14–20 May
- Edition: 95th
- Category: Tennis Masters Series
- Draw: 64S / 32D
- Prize money: $2,450,000
- Surface: Clay / outdoor
- Location: Hamburg, Germany
- Venue: Rothenbaum Tennis Center

Champions

Singles
- (Spain) Albert Portas

Doubles
- (Sweden) Jonas Björkman / (Australia) Todd Woodbridge
← 2000 ·	Hamburg Masters	· 2002 →

The 2001 Hamburg Masters was a men's tennis tournament played on outdoor clay courts. It was the 95th edition of the Hamburg Masters and was part of the Tennis Masters Series of the 2001 ATP Tour. It took place at the Am Rothenbaum in Hamburg in Germany from 14 May through 20 May 2001.

The men's field was headlined by ATP No. 1, Buenos Aires, Acapulco, Monte Carlo and Hamburg defending champion Gustavo Kuerten, Paris and US Open champion and Dubai runner-up Marat Safin, and Australian Open, Indian Wells and Miami champion and San Jose runner-up Andre Agassi. Other top seeds competing were Wimbledon defending champion Pete Sampras, Sydney and Scottsdale finalist Magnus Norman, Yevgeny Kafelnikov, Lleyton Hewitt and Juan Carlos Ferrero.

== Finals ==
=== Singles ===
(Spain) Albert Portas defeated (Spain) Juan Carlos Ferrero 4–6, 6–2, 0–6, 7–6^{(7–5)}, 7–5

- It was Portas' only singles title of his career.

=== Doubles ===
(Sweden) Jonas Björkman / (Australia) Todd Woodbridge defeated (Canada) Daniel Nestor / (Australia) Sandon Stolle 7–6^{(7–2)}, 3–6, 6–3

- It was Björkman's 4th title of the year and the 29th of his career. It was Woodbridge's 3rd title of the year and the 72nd of his career.
