= 2002 Hamburg Masters =

- Date: 13–19 May
- Edition: 96th
- Category: Tennis Masters Series
- Draw: 64S / 32D
- Prize money: $2,328,000
- Surface: Clay / outdoor
- Location: Hamburg, Germany
- Venue: Am Rothenbaum

Champions

Singles
- (Switzerland) Roger Federer

Doubles
- (India) Mahesh Bhupathi / (United States) Jan-Michael Gambill
← 2001 ·	Hamburg Masters	· 2003 →

The 2002 Hamburg Masters was a men's tennis tournament played on outdoor clay courts. It was the 96th edition of the Hamburg Masters and was part of the Tennis Masters Series of the 2002 ATP Tour. It took place at the Am Rothenbaum in Hamburg in Germany from 13 May through 19 May 2002.

The men's singles event field was headlined by World no.1 Lleyton Hewitt. Other top seeds competing were (in order) Gustavo Kuerten, Juan Carlos Ferrero and Yevgeny Kafelnikov. Ninth-seeded Andre Agassi withdrew just before the tournament and was replaced by lucky loser Fernando Meligeni. Roger Federer, seeded 11th, won the singles title.

== Finals ==
=== Singles ===
(Switzerland) Roger Federer defeated (Russia) Marat Safin 6–1, 6–3, 6–4

- It was Federer's 2nd title of the year and the 3rd of his career. It was his 1st Masters title of his career.

=== Doubles ===
(India) Mahesh Bhupathi / (United States) Jan-Michael Gambill defeated (Sweden) Jonas Björkman / (Australia) Todd Woodbridge 6–2, 6–4

- It was Bhupathi's 3rd title of the year and the 24th of his career. It was Gambill's 1st title of the year and the 5th of his career.
