= 2002 Hamburg Masters – Doubles =

Doubles
- 2002 Hamburg Masters

Final
- Champions: (India) Mahesh Bhupathi (United States) Jan-Michael Gambill
- Runners-up: (Sweden) Jonas Björkman (Australia) Todd Woodbridge
- Score: 6–2, 6–4

Events
Singles	Doubles
← 2001 ·	Hamburg Masters	· 2003 →

Jonas Björkman and Todd Woodbridge were the defending champions but lost in the final 6–2, 6–4 against Mahesh Bhupathi and Jan-Michael Gambill.

== Seeds ==
Champion seeds are indicated in bold text while text in italics indicates the round in which those seeds were eliminated.

1. (United States) Donald Johnson / (United States) Jared Palmer (second round)
2. (The Bahamas) Mark Knowles / (Canada) Daniel Nestor (quarterfinals)
3. (Zimbabwe) Wayne Black / (Zimbabwe) Kevin Ullyett (first round)
4. (Sweden) Jonas Björkman / (Australia) Todd Woodbridge (final)
5. (United States) Bob Bryan / (United States) Mike Bryan (first round)
6. (Australia) Joshua Eagle / (Australia) Sandon Stolle (quarterfinals)
7. (Czech Republic) Petr Pála / (Czech Republic) Pavel Vízner (first round)
8. (United States) Rick Leach / (United States) Brian MacPhie (first round)

== Draw ==
=== Key ===
- Q = Qualifier
- WC = Wild card
- LL = Lucky loser
- Alt = Alternate
- SE = Special exempt
- PR = Protected ranking
- ITF = ITF entry
- JE = Junior exempt
- w/o = Walkover
- r = Retired
- d = Defaulted
- SR = Special ranking

=== Final ===
Final
4	(Sweden) Jonas Björkman (Australia) Todd Woodbridge	2	4
	(India) **Mahesh Bhupathi** (United States) **Jan-Michael Gambill**	**6**	**6**

=== Top half ===
First round
1	(United States) **D Johnson** (United States) **J Palmer**	3	**6**	**[10]**
(United States) A Roddick (France) F Santoro	**6**	3	[6]
WC	(Germany) L Burgsmüller (Germany) J Knippschild	3	2
(Czech Republic) **J Novák** (Czech Republic) **R Štěpánek**	**6**	**6**
(France) **A Clément** (France) **N Escudé**	4	**6**	**[10]**
(Argentina) L Arnold (Argentina) G Etlis	**6**	3	[7]
(United Kingdom) T Henman (Australia) L Hewitt	6^{7}	3
6	(Australia) **J Eagle** (Australia) **S Stolle**	**7^{9}**	**6**
4	(Sweden) **J Björkman** (Australia) **T Woodbridge**	**6**	**6**
(Sweden) S Aspelin (United States) J Tarango	3	3
ALT	(Sweden) **T Enqvist** (Ecuador) **N Lapentti**	**6**	6^{5}	**[10]**
(Germany) K Braasch (Russia) A Olhovskiy	2	**7^{7}**	[4]
(Australia) P Hanley (Australia) A Kratzmann	4	4
(France) **J Boutter** (Netherlands) **S Schalken**	**6**	**6**
(South Africa) **D Adams** (Germany) **M Kohlmann**	**6**	**6**
7	(Czech Republic) P Pála (Czech Republic) P Vízner	4	2

Second round
1	(United States) D Johnson (United States) J Palmer	4	4
(Czech Republic) **J Novák** (Czech Republic) **R Štěpánek**	**6**	**6**
(France) A Clément (France) N Escudé	**6**	2	[4]
6	(Australia) **J Eagle** (Australia) **S Stolle**	1	**6**	**[10]**
4	(Sweden) **J Björkman** (Australia) **T Woodbridge**	**6**	**7^{7}**
ALT	(Sweden) T Enqvist (Ecuador) N Lapentti	3	6^{5}
(France) J Boutter (Netherlands) S Schalken	6^{3}	4
(South Africa) **D Adams** (Germany) **M Kohlmann**	**7^{7}**	**6**

Quarterfinals
(Czech Republic) **J Novák** (Czech Republic) **R Štěpánek**	**7**	3	**[10]**
6	(Australia) J Eagle (Australia) S Stolle	5	**6**	[5]
4	(Sweden) **J Björkman** (Australia) **T Woodbridge**	**6**	4	**[11]**
(South Africa) D Adams (Germany) M Kohlmann	3	**6**	[9]

Semifinals
(Czech Republic) J Novák (Czech Republic) R Štěpánek	**6**	3	[10]
4	(Sweden) **J Björkman** (Australia) **T Woodbridge**	2	**6**	**[12]**

=== Bottom half ===
First round
5	(United States) B Bryan (United States) M Bryan	**6**	2	[7]
(India) **M Bhupathi** (United States) **J-M Gambill**	3	**6**	**[10]**
(Czech Republic) **T Cibulec** (India) **L Paes**	**6**	**6**
(Czech Republic) L Friedl (Czech Republic) D Rikl	2	4
(Argentina) G Cañas (Russia) M Safin	6^{9}	4
(Sweden) **T Johansson** (Australia) **M Philippoussis**	**7^{11}**	**6**
WC	(Germany) **N Kiefer** (Romania) **A Pavel**	**7**	**6**
3	(Zimbabwe) W Black (Zimbabwe) K Ullyett	5	3
8	(United States) R Leach (United States) B MacPhie	2	3
(Australia) **W Arthurs** (Czech Republic) **C Suk**	**6**	**6**
WC	(Germany) P Petzschner (Germany) B Phau	4	4
(South Africa) **W Ferreira** (Russia) **Y Kafelnikov**	**6**	**6**
(Australia) **M Hill** (Czech Republic) **D Vacek**	**6**	**6**
(South Africa) R Koenig (Japan) T Shimada	3	3
(Germany) T Haas (Germany) R Schüttler	6^{3}	4
2	(The Bahamas) **M Knowles** (Canada) **D Nestor**	**7^{7}**	**6**

Second round
(India) **M Bhupathi** (United States) **J-M Gambill**	**6**	4	**[10]**
(Czech Republic) T Cibulec (India) L Paes	2	**6**	[5]
(Sweden) T Johansson (Australia) M Philippoussis
WC	(Germany) **N Kiefer** (Romania) **A Pavel**	w/o
(Australia) W Arthurs (Czech Republic) C Suk	**7^{7}**	3	[8]
(South Africa) **W Ferreira** (Russia) **Y Kafelnikov**	6^{5}	**6**	**[10]**
(Australia) M Hill (Czech Republic) D Vacek	**7^{7}**	5	[11]
2	(The Bahamas) **M Knowles** (Canada) **D Nestor**	6^{3}	**7**	**[13]**

Quarterfinals
(India) **M Bhupathi** (United States) **J-M Gambill**	5	**7**	**[10]**
WC	(Germany) N Kiefer (Romania) A Pavel	**7**	5	[8]
(South Africa) **W Ferreira** (Russia) **Y Kafelnikov**	6^{6}	**7^{7}**	**[10]**
2	(The Bahamas) M Knowles (Canada) D Nestor	**7^{8}**	6^{2}	[8]

Semifinals
(India) **M Bhupathi** (United States) **J-M Gambill**	**6**	**7^{7}**
(South Africa) W Ferreira (Russia) Y Kafelnikov	1	6^{3}
