= Michael Kohlmann =

German tennis player

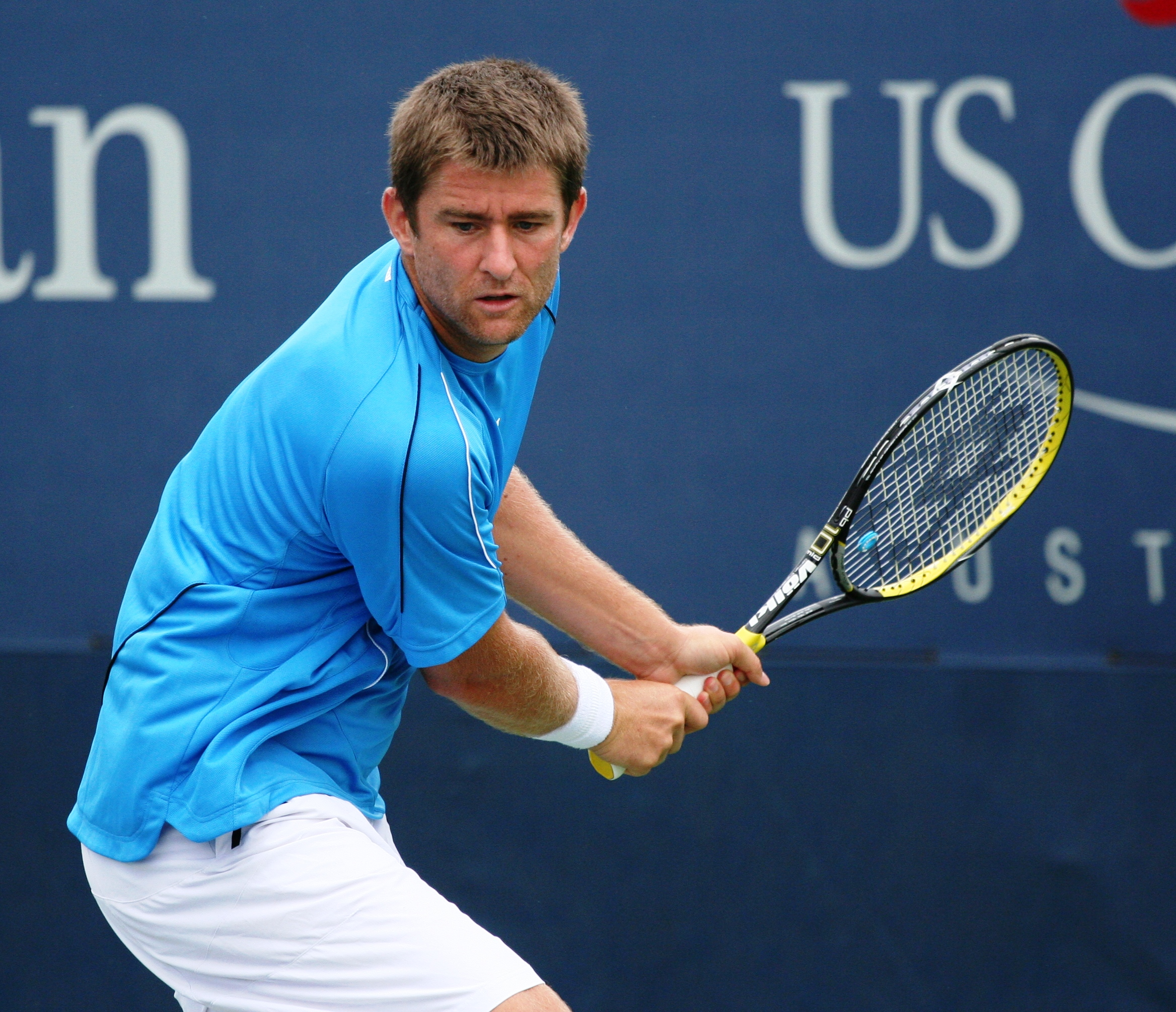
- Country (sports): Germany
- Residence: Munich, Germany
- Born: 11 January 1974 (age 52) Hagen, Germany
- Height: 1.87 m (6 ft 1 1/2 in)
- Turned pro: 1995
- Retired: 2013
- Plays: Right-handed (two-handed backhand)
- Prize money: $1,798,467

Singles
- Career record: 25–49
- Career titles: 0
- Highest ranking: No. 98 (30 November 1998)

Grand Slam singles results
- Australian Open: 1R (1999, 2002)
- French Open: Q3 (2001, 2002)
- Wimbledon: 1R (1999, 2000, 2002)
- US Open: 3R (1998)

Doubles
- Career record: 219–261
- Career titles: 5
- Highest ranking: No. 27 (5 March 2007)

Grand Slam doubles results
- Australian Open: SF (2010)
- French Open: QF (2007)
- Wimbledon: 2R (2002, 2006, 2007, 2008, 2012)
- US Open: 3R (2006)

Grand Slam mixed doubles results
- Australian Open: 1R (2011)
- French Open: 1R (2010)
- Wimbledon: 2R (2005)

Team competitions
- Davis Cup: SF (2007)
- Last updated on: 29 June 2021.

Michael Kohlmann (born 11 January 1974) is a retired professional tennis player from Germany.

Primarily a doubles specialist, he has won five ATP Tour doubles titles in his career. In March 2007, he reached his career-high doubles ranking of World No. 27.

Kohlmann reached the third round of the 1998 US Open in singles and was part of the squad who reached the semifinals of the 2007 Davis Cup. Since 2015 he is the captain of the Germany Davis Cup Team.

== Performance timelines ==
Key
W	F	SF	QF	#R	RR	Q#	DNQ	A	NH

(W) winner; (F) finalist; (SF) semifinalist; (QF) quarterfinalist; (#R) rounds 4, 3, 2, 1; (RR) round-robin stage; (Q#) qualification round; (DNQ) did not qualify; (A) absent; (NH) not held; (SR) strike rate (events won / competed); (W–L) win–loss record.

=== Singles ===
Tournament	1997	1998	1999	2000	2001	2002	2003	2004	2005	2006	SR	W–L	Win%
Grand Slam tournaments
Australian Open	A	Q1	1R	Q1	Q2	1R	Q2	A	A	Q1	0 / 2	0–2	0%
French Open	Q1	A	Q1	Q2	Q3	Q3	A	A	A	A	0 / 0	0–0	–
Wimbledon	A	Q2	1R	1R	Q3	1R	A	A	A	A	0 / 3	0–3	0%
US Open	A	3R	2R	Q2	A	Q1	Q3	A	A	A	0 / 2	3–2	60%
Win–loss	0–0	2–1	1–3	0–1	0–0	0–2	0–0	0–0	0–0	0–0	0 / 7	3–7	30%
ATP Tour Masters 1000
Indian Wells	A	A	A	A	A	A	A	Q1	A	A	0 / 0	0–0	–
Miami	A	A	A	A	A	Q1	Q1	A	A	A	0 / 0	0–0	–
Hamburg	A	Q1	1R	2R	A	Q1	Q1	A	A	Q1	0 / 2	1–2	33%
Stuttgart	A	A	Q2	A	A	A	A	A	A	A	0 / 0	0–0	–
Win–loss	0–0	0–0	0–1	1–1	0–0	0–0	0–0	0–0	0–0	0–0	0 / 2	1–2	33%

=== Doubles ===
Tournament	1998	1999	2000	2001	2002	2003	2004	2005	2006	2007	2008	2009	2010	2011	2012	2013	SR	W–L	Win%
Grand Slam tournaments
Australian Open	1R	2R	1R	1R	1R	1R	2R	1R	1R	1R	A	1R	SF	3R	2R	2R	0 / 15	10–15	40%
French Open	A	1R	A	2R	1R	2R	3R	2R	1R	QF	A	3R	1R	3R	1R	A	0 / 12	12–12	50%
Wimbledon	Q2	1R	Q2	Q1	2R	A	1R	1R	2R	2R	2R	A	1R	1R	2R	Q1	0 / 10	5–10	33%
US Open	2R	1R	1R	A	1R	2R	2R	A	3R	2R	1R	2R	2R	2R	1R	A	0 / 13	9–13	41%
Win–loss	1–2	1–4	0–2	1–2	1–4	2–3	4–4	1–3	3–4	5–4	1–2	3–3	5–4	5–4	2–4	1–1	0 / 50	36–50	42%
ATP Tour Masters 1000
Indian Wells	A	A	A	A	A	A	1R	QF	A	1R	A	A	A	A	A	A	0 / 3	2–3	40%
Miami	A	A	A	1R	3R	2R	A	1R	A	2R	A	A	QF	A	A	A	0 / 6	6–6	0%
Monte Carlo	A	A	A	A	A	A	A	2R	A	1R	A	A	2R	A	A	A	0 / 3	2–3	40%
Hamburg	1R	1R	QF	1R	QF	1R	QF	2R	2R	1R	A	Not Masters Series					0 / 10	8–10	44%
Stuttgart	A	2R	A	A	Not Held												0 / 1	1–1	50%
Paris Masters	A	A	A	A	A	A	A	A	A	A	A	A	2R	A	A	A	0 / 1	1–1	40%
Win–loss	0–1	1–2	2–1	0–2	4–2	1–2	2–2	4–4	1–1	1–4	0–0	0–0	4–3	0–0	0–0	0–0	0 / 24	20–24	45%

=== Mixed doubles ===
Tournament	2004	2005	2006	2007	2008	2009	2010	2011	SR	W–L	Win%
Grand Slam tournaments
Australian Open	A	A	A	A	A	A	A	1R	0 / 1	0–1	0%
French Open	A	A	A	A	A	A	1R	A	0 / 1	0–1	0%
Wimbledon	1R	2R	A	A	A	A	1R	A	0 / 3	1–3	25%
US Open	A	A	A	A	A	A	A	A	0 / 0	0–0	–
Win–loss	0–1	1–1	0–0	0–0	0–0	0–0	0–2	0–1	0 / 5	1–5	17%

== ATP Career Finals ==
=== Doubles: 19 (5 titles, 14 runner-ups) ===
Legend (doubles) Grand Slam (1–0) ATP World Tour Finals (0–0) ATP Masters Series (0–1) ATP Championship Series (0–1) ATP International Series (5–14)	Finals by surface Hard (3–5) Clay (1–7) Grass (0–2) Carpet (1–0)	Finals by setting Outdoor (3–11) Indoor (2–3)

Result	W–L	Date	Tournament	Tier	Surface	Partner	Opponents	Score
Loss	0–1	Sep 1999	Bournemouth, United Kingdom	World Series	Clay	(Sweden) Nicklas Kulti	(South Africa) David Adams (United States) Jeff Tarango	3–6, 7–6^{(7–5)}, 6–7^{(5–7)}
Loss	0–2	Jul 2000	Gstaad, Switzerland	International Series	Clay	(France) Jérôme Golmard	(Czech Republic) Jiří Novák (Czech Republic) David Rikl	6–3, 3–6, 4–6
Win	1–2	Feb 2002	Copenhagen, Denmark	International Series	Hard	(Austria) Julian Knowle	(Czech Republic) Jiří Novák (Czech Republic) Radek Štěpánek	7–6^{(12–10)}, 7–5
Loss	1–3	Apr 2002	Majorca, Spain	International Series	Clay	(Austria) Julian Knowle	(India) Mahesh Bhupathi (India) Leander Paes	2–6, 4–6
Win	2–3	Jan 2003	Madras, India	International Series	Hard	(Austria) Julian Knowle	(Czech Republic) František Čermák (Czech Republic) Leoš Friedl	7–6^{(7–1)}, 7–6^{(7–3)}
Loss	2–4	Feb 2003	Copenhagen, Denmark	International Series	Hard	(Austria) Julian Knowle	(Czech Republic) Tomáš Cibulec (Czech Republic) Pavel Vízner	5–7, 7–5, 6–2
Loss	2–5	Oct 2003	St. Petersburg, Russia	International Series	Clay	(Germany) Rainer Schüttler	(Austria) Julian Knowle (Serbia and Montenegro) Nenad Zimonjić	4–6, 4–6
Loss	2–6	May 2004	Casablanca, Morocco	International Series	Hard	(Switzerland) Yves Allegro	(Italy) Enzo Artoni (Spain) Fernando Vicente	6–7^{(1–7)}, 3–6
Loss	2–7	Aug 2004	Long Island, United States	International Series	Hard	(Switzerland) Yves Allegro	(France) Antony Dupuis (France) Michaël Llodra	2–6, 4–6
Win	3–7	Jan 2005	Auckland, New Zealand	International Series	Hard	(Switzerland) Yves Allegro	(Sweden) Simon Aspelin (Australia) Todd Perry	6–4, 7–6^{(7–4)}
Loss	3–8	Feb 2005	San José, United States	International Series	Hard	(Switzerland) Yves Allegro	(Australia) Wayne Arthurs (Australia) Paul Hanley	6–7^{(4–7)}, 4–6
Loss	3–9	Jul 2005	Gstaad, Switzerland	International Series	Clay	(Germany) Rainer Schüttler	(Czech Republic) František Čermák (Czech Republic) Leoš Friedl	6–7^{(6–8)}, 6–7^{(11–13)}
Win	4–9	Apr 2006	Houston, United States	International Series	Clay	(Germany) Alexander Waske	(Austria) Julian Knowle (Austria) Jürgen Melzer	5–7, 6–4, [10–5]
Loss	4–10	Apr 2006	Casablanca, Morocco	International Series	Clay	(Germany) Alexander Waske	(Austria) Julian Knowle (Austria) Jürgen Melzer	3–6, 4–6
Loss	4–11	Jun 2006	Halle, Germany	International Series	Grass	(Germany) Rainer Schüttler	(France) Fabrice Santoro (Serbia) Nenad Zimonjić	0–6, 4–6
Win	5–11	Jan 2007	Zagreb, Croatia	International Series	Carpet	(Germany) Alexander Waske	(Czech Republic) František Čermák (Czech Republic) Jaroslav Levinský	7–6^{(7–5)}, 4–6, [10–5]
Loss	5–12	Jul 2009	Newport, United States	International Series	Grass	(Netherlands) Rogier Wassen	(Australia) Jordan Kerr (United States) Rajeev Ram	7–6^{(8–6)}, 4–6, [6–10]
Loss	5–13	May 2010	Munich, Germany	International Series	Clay	(United States) Eric Butorac	(Austria) Oliver Marach (Spain) Santiago Ventura	7–5, 3–6, [14–16]
Loss	5–14	Oct 2011	Bangkok, Thailand	International Series	Hard	(Germany) Alexander Waske	(Austria) Oliver Marach (Pakistan) Aisam Qureshi	6–7^{(4–7)}, 6–7^{(5–7)}

== ATP Challenger and ITF Futures finals ==
=== Singles: 10 (5–5) ===
Legend ATP Challenger (5–5) ITF Futures (0–0)	Finals by surface Hard (2–1) Clay (0–1) Grass (0–0) Carpet (3–3)

Result	W–L	Date	Tournament	Tier	Surface	Opponent	Score
Win	1–0	Dec 1997	Bad Lippspringe, Germany	Challenger	Carpet	(Germany) Rainer Schüttler	4–6, 7–6, 7–5
Loss	1–1	Feb 1998	Lübeck, Germany	Challenger	Carpet	(Netherlands) Peter Wessels	6–7, 3–6
Win	2–1	Mar 1998	Kyoto, Japan	Challenger	Carpet	(United States) Steve Campbell	7–6, 3–6, 6–3
Loss	2–2	Feb 1999	Lübeck, Germany	Challenger	Carpet	(Germany) Axel Pretzsch	6–7, 4–6
Win	3–2	Feb 2001	Hull, United Kingdom	Challenger	Carpet	(Denmark) Kristian Pless	5–7, 7–6^{(7–3)}, 7–6^{(7–5)}
Loss	3–3	Mar 2001	Kyoto, Japan	Challenger	Carpet	(Netherlands) John van Lottum	7–6^{(7–3)}, 4–6, 5–7
Win	4–3	Aug 2001	Wrexham, United Kingdom	Challenger	Hard	(Slovakia) Ladislav Švarc	6–4, 6–2
Loss	4–4	Sep 2001	Zabrze, Poland	Challenger	Clay	(Czech Republic) Ota Fukárek	3–6, 4–6
Loss	4–5	Nov 2001	Caracas, Venezuela	Challenger	Hard	(Austria) Julian Knowle	6–7^{(5–7)}, 6–1, 3–6
Win	5–5	Dec 2001	San Jose, Costa Rica	Challenger	Hard	(Netherlands) John van Lottum	6–3, 6–4

=== Doubles: 41 (23–18) ===
Legend ATP Challenger (23–18) ITF Futures (0–0)	Finals by surface Hard (8–6) Clay (5–5) Grass (0–0) Carpet (10–7)

Result	W–L	Date	Tournament	Tier	Surface	Partner	Opponents	Score
Loss	0–1	Nov 1996	Portorož, Sloveniz	Challenger	Hard	(Germany) Mathias Huning	(Federal Republic of Yugoslavia) Nebojsa Djordjevic (North Macedonia) Aleksandar Kitinov	5–7, 7–5, 3–6
Win	1–1	Aug 1997	Nettingsdorf, Austria	Challenger	Clay	(Germany) Björn Jacob	(Austria) Thomas Buchmayer (Austria) Thomas Strengberger	6–2, 3–6, 6–3
Win	2–1	Sep 1997	Seville, Spain	Challenger	Clay	(Finland) Tuomas Ketola	(Spain) Álex Calatrava (Spain) Jose Imaz-Ruiz	4–6, 6–1, 6–3
Win	3–1	Dec 1997	Bad Lippspringe, Germany	Challenger	Carpet	(Finland) Tuomas Ketola	(Germany) Lars Koslowski (Germany) Dirk Dier	4–6, 6–3, 7–5
Win	4–1	Dec 1997	Wismar, Germany	Challenger	Carpet	(Germany) Lars Koslowski	(Mexico) Bernardo Martínez (Mexico) Óscar Ortiz	6–4, 7–6
Loss	4–2	Jul 1998	Ulm, Germany	Challenger	Clay	(Germany) Dirk Dier	(Brazil) Márcio Carlsson (Brazil) Jaime Oncins	4–6, 7–6, 3–6
Win	5–2	Jan 1999	Heilbronn, Germany	Challenger	Carpet	(Switzerland) Filippo Veglio	(United States) Justin Gimelstob (United States) Chris Woodruff	6–4, 6–7, 7–5
Win	6–2	Feb 1999	Hamburg, Germany	Challenger	Carpet	(Switzerland) Filippo Veglio	(Argentina) Martin Garcia (Brazil) Cristiano Testa	6–4, 7–6
Loss	6–3	Feb 1999	Lübeck, Germany	Challenger	Carpet	(Switzerland) Filippo Veglio	(Germany) Patrick Sommer (Germany) Franz Stauder	4–6, 5–7
Loss	6–4	Jul 1999	Ulm, Germany	Challenger	Clay	(Germany) Dirk Dier	(Australia) Andrew Painter (South Africa) Byron Talbot	3–6, 4–6
Win	7–4	Sep 1999	Aschaffenburg, Germany	Challenger	Clay	(Argentina) Francisco Cabello	(Italy) Vincenzo Santopadre (Brazil) Cristiano Testa	1–6, 6–3, 6–4
Loss	7–5	Mar 2000	Magdeburg, Germany	Challenger	Carpet	(Germany) Tomas Behrend	(Germany) Dirk Dier (Germany) Karsten Braasch	5–7, 6–7^{(6–8)}
Loss	7–6	Oct 2000	Eckental, Germany	Challenger	Carpet	(Switzerland) Ivo Heuberger	(Germany) Jens Knippschild (Germany) Karsten Braasch	6–7^{(5–7)}, 3–6
Loss	7–7	Nov 2000	Aachen, Germany	Challenger	Carpet	(Germany) Franz Stauder	(Netherlands) Sander Groen (Netherlands) Jan Siemerink	7–6^{(7–2)}, 6–7^{(7–9)}, 3–6
Win	8–7	Nov 2000	Knoxville, United States	Challenger	Hard	(Germany) Karsten Braasch	(South Africa) Jeff Coetzee (South Africa) Marcos Ondruska	6–0, 7–6^{(7–4)}
Loss	8–8	Feb 2001	Wrocław, Poland	Challenger	Hard	(Austria) Julian Knowle	(Zimbabwe) Wayne Black (South Africa) Jason Weir-Smith	7–6^{(7–2)}, 6–7^{(7–9)}, 3–6
Loss	8–9	Feb 2001	Lübeck, Germany	Challenger	Carpet	(Switzerland) Yves Allegro	(Austria) Julian Knowle (Switzerland) Lorenzo Manta	3–6, 6–3, 6–7^{(2–7)}
Win	9–9	Feb 2001	Hull, United Kingdom	Challenger	Carpet	(France) Michaël Llodra	(United Kingdom) Martin Lee (United Kingdom) Barry Cowan	6–2, 6–3
Win	10–9	Sep 2001	Zabrze, Poland	Challenger	Clay	(Austria) Julian Knowle	(Slovakia) Karol Beck (Slovakia) Igor Zelenay	6–1, 7–6^{(7–5)}
Loss	10–10	Sep 2001	Istanbul, Turkey	Challenger	Hard	(Netherlands) Sander Groen	(France) Michaël Llodra (Israel) Jonathan Erlich	walkover
Win	11–10	Nov 2001	Aachen, Germany	Challenger	Carpet	(Austria) Julian Knowle	(Germany) Marc-Kevin Goellner (South Africa) Marcos Ondruska	6–3, 7–6^{(7–4)}
Win	12–10	Nov 2001	Caracas, Venezuela	Challenger	Hard	(Austria) Julian Knowle	(Germany) Tomas Behrend (Brazil) Daniel Melo	7–5, 6–3
Loss	12–11	Dec 2001	Rio de Janeiro, Brazil	Challenger	Hard	(Austria) Julian Knowle	(United States) Justin Gimelstob (Australia) David Macpherson	6–7^{(5–7)}, 3–6
Loss	12–12	Mar 2003	Salinas, Ecuador	Challenger	Hard	(Israel) Harel Levy	(Argentina) Sebastián Prieto (Argentina) Martin Garcia	walkover
Win	13–12	Feb 2004	Wrocław, Poland	Challenger	Hard	(Slovakia) Dominik Hrbatý	(Poland) Bartłomiej Dąbrowski (Poland) Łukasz Kubot	7–5, 6–3
Loss	13–13	Nov 2004	Luxembourg, Luxembourg	Challenger	Hard	(Germany) Karsten Braasch	(Italy) Massimo Bertolini (Czech Republic) Petr Luxa	6–7^{(4–7)}, 6–4, 3–6
Loss	13–14	Nov 2005	Aachen, Germany	Challenger	Carpet	(Germany) Lars Burgsmüller	(United Kingdom) James Auckland (United Kingdom) Jamie Delgado	6–2, 5–7, 3–6
Win	14–14	Nov 2005	Helsinki, Finland	Challenger	Hard	(Switzerland) Yves Allegro	(Germany) Christopher Kas (Germany) Philipp Petzschner	4–6, 6–1, 6–4
Win	15–14	Jan 2006	Waikoloa, United States	Challenger	Hard	(United States) Cecil Mamiit	(United States) Scott Lipsky (United States) David Martin	6–3, 6–4
Win	16–14	Feb 2006	Belgrade, Serbia	Challenger	Carpet	(Germany) Alexander Waske	(Czech Republic) Ivo Minář (Czech Republic) Jan Minar	7–6^{(7–3)}, 6–3
Loss	16–15	Apr 2006	Mexico City, Mexico	Challenger	Clay	(Germany) Alexander Waske	(United States) Tripp Phillips (Netherlands) Rogier Wassen	7–6^{(7–4)}, 4–6, [11–13]
Win	17–15	Jan 2007	Heilbronn, Germany	Challenger	Hard	(Germany) Rainer Schüttler	(Netherlands) Sander Groen (France) Michaël Llodra	walkover
Win	18–15	Aug 2008	Istanbul, Turkey	Challenger	Hard	(Germany) Frank Moser	(Czech Republic) David Škoch (Slovakia) Igor Zelenay	7–6^{(7–4)}, 6–4
Win	19–15	Nov 2008	Aachen, Germany	Challenger	Carpet	(Germany) Alexander Waske	(United States) Travis Parrott (Slovakia) Filip Polášek	6–4, 6–4
Win	20–15	Feb 2009	Belgrade, Serbia	Challenger	Carpet	(Germany) Philipp Marx	(Pakistan) Aisam Qureshi (Croatia) Lovro Zovko	3–6, 6–2, [10–8]
Loss	20–16	Mar 2009	Rabat, Morocco	Challenger	Clay	(Germany) Philipp Marx	(Spain) Rubén Ramírez Hidalgo (Spain) Santiago Ventura	4–6, 6–7^{(5–7)}
Loss	20–17	Jul 2009	Poznań, Poland	Challenger	Clay	(Netherlands) Rogier Wassen	(Argentina) Sergio Roitman (France) Alexandre Sidorenko	4–6, 4–6
Win	21–17	Nov 2009	Eckental, Germany	Challenger	Carpet	(Austria) Alexander Peya	(Germany) Philipp Marx (Slovakia) Igor Zelenay	6–4, 7–6^{(7–4)}
Win	22–17	Apr 2011	Johannesburg, South Africa	Challenger	Hard	(Austria) Alexander Peya	(Germany) Andre Begemann (Australia) Matthew Ebden	6–2, 6–2
Win	23–17	Aug 2011	Cordenons, Italy	Challenger	Clay	(Austria) Julian Knowle	(Australia) Colin Ebelthite (Australia) Adam Feeney	2–6, 7–5, [10–5]
Loss	23–18	Nov 2012	Ortisei, Italy	Challenger	Carpet	(Australia) Rameez Junaid	(South Africa) Rik de Voest (Slovakia) Karol Beck	3–6, 4–6
