= Michel Kratochvil =

Swiss tennis player (born 1979)

Michel Frank Kratochvil
- Country (sports): Switzerland
- Residence: Ostermundigen, Switzerland
- Born: 7 April 1979 (age 47) Bern, Switzerland
- Height: 1.85 m (6 ft 1 in)
- Turned pro: 1997
- Retired: 2008
- Plays: Right-handed (two-handed backhand)
- Prize money: US$1,159,379

Singles
- Career record: 73–98
- Career titles: 0; 5 Challenger, 0 Futures
- Highest ranking: No. 35 (8 July 2002)

Grand Slam singles results
- Australian Open: 3R (2001)
- French Open: 3R (2000)
- Wimbledon: 4R (2002)
- US Open: 1R (2000, 2001, 2002)

Doubles
- Career record: 7–18
- Career titles: 0; 0 Challenger, 0 Futures
- Highest ranking: No. 269 (16 September 2002)
- Last updated on: 23 November 2022.

Michel Frank Kratochvil (Czech: Kratochvíl; born 7 April 1979) is a former tennis player from Switzerland. He was a member of the Swiss Davis Cup Team between 2000 and 2004 with a singles record 3–9, winning the decider in the first round of the 2003 World Group against Martin Verkerk of Netherlands 1–6, 7–6, 7–6, 6–1. He played doubles alongside Roger Federer in the 2002 Gstaad Open who was the defending champion but lost in the first round this time. He also defeated reigning champion Andre Agassi in the first round 2002 Indian Wells Masters.

== ATP career finals ==
=== Singles: 2 (2 runner-ups) ===
Legend Grand Slam Tournaments (0–0) ATP World Tour Finals (0–0) ATP Masters Series (0–0) ATP Championship Series (0–1) ATP World Series (0–1)	Finals by surface Hard (0–2) Clay (0–0) Grass (0–0) Carpet (0–0)	Finals by setting Outdoors (0–2) Indoors (0–0)

Result	W–L	Date	Tournament	Tier	Surface	Opponent	Score
Loss	0–1	Sep 2001	Shanghai, China	International Series	Hard	(Germany) Rainer Schüttler	3–6, 4–6
Loss	0–2	Oct 2001	Tokyo, Japan	Championship Series	Hard	(Australia) Lleyton Hewitt	4–6, 2–6

== ATP Challenger and ITF Futures finals ==
=== Singles: 10 (5–5) ===
Legend ATP Challenger (5–2) ITF Futures (0–3)	Finals by surface Hard (2–3) Clay (3–2) Grass (0–0) Carpet (0–0)

Result	W–L	Date	Tournament	Tier	Surface	Opponent	Score
Loss	0–1	Aug 1998	Austria F7, Vienna	Futures	Clay	(Austria) Thomas Schiessling	3–6, 4–6
Loss	0–2	Jan 1999	India F3, Bombay	Futures	Hard	(Thailand) Paradorn Srichaphan	6–7, 2–6
Loss	0–3	Apr 1999	Italy F4, Frascati	Futures	Clay	(Romania) Ionuț Moldovan	2–6, 1–6
Win	1–3	Aug 1999	Vienna, Austria	Challenger	Clay	(Argentina) Marcelo Charpentier	3–6, 7–6, 6–2
Win	2–3	Aug 1999	Sylt, Germany	Challenger	Clay	(Spain) Emilio Benfele Álvarez	6–1, 6–1
Win	3–3	Aug 1999	Geneva, Switzerland	Challenger	Clay	(Bulgaria) Orlin Stanoytchev	6–0, 6–1
Loss	3–4	Sep 2000	Houston, United States	Challenger	Hard	(United States) James Blake	6–7^{(5–7)}, 7–6^{(14–12)}, 3–6
Win	4–4	Nov 2000	Osaka, Japan	Challenger	Hard	(South Korea) Lee Hyung-taik	2–6, 6–2, 6–2
Win	5–4	Nov 2000	Brest, France	Challenger	Hard	(Sweden) Johan Settergren	3–6, 6–4, 7–6^{(7–2)}
Loss	5–5	Sep 2003	Istanbul, Turkey	Challenger	Hard	(Sweden) Robin Söderling	6–7^{(4–7)}, 2–6

=== Doubles: 4 (0–4) ===
Legend ATP Challenger (0–4) ITF Futures (0–0)	Finals by surface Hard (0–2) Clay (0–2) Grass (0–0) Carpet (0–0)

Result	W–L	Date	Tournament	Tier	Surface	Partner	Opponents	Score
Loss	0–1	Aug 1996	Geneva, Switzerland	Challenger	Clay	(Switzerland) George Bastl	(Germany) Patrick Baur (Germany) Jens Knippschild	1–6, 1–6
Loss	0–2	Aug 1999	Vienna, Austria	Challenger	Clay	(Czech Republic) Petr Kralert	(Austria) Julian Knowle (Austria) Thomas Strengberger	3–6, 2–6
Loss	0–3	Nov 2004	Réunion Island, Réunion	Challenger	Hard	(Czech Republic) Jiří Vaněk	(Thailand) Sanchai Ratiwatana (Thailand) Sonchat Ratiwatana	walkover
Loss	0–4	Aug 2007	Segovia, Spain	Challenger	Hard	(Luxembourg) Gilles Müller	(India) Rohan Bopanna (Pakistan) Aisam Qureshi	6–7^{(8–10)}, 3–6

== Performance timeline ==
Key
W	F	SF	QF	#R	RR	Q#	P#	DNQ	A	Z#	PO	G	S	B	NMS	NTI	P	NH

(W) winner; (F) finalist; (SF) semifinalist; (QF) quarterfinalist; (#R) rounds 4, 3, 2, 1; (RR) round-robin stage; (Q#) qualification round; (P#) preliminary round; (DNQ) did not qualify; (A) absent; (Z#) Davis/Fed Cup Zonal Group (with number indication) or (PO) play-off; (G) gold, (S) silver or (B) bronze Olympic/Paralympic medal; (NMS) not a Masters tournament; (NTI) not a Tier I tournament; (P) postponed; (NH) not held; (SR) strike rate (events won / competed); (W–L) win–loss record.

=== Singles ===
Tournament	1997	1998	1999	2000	2001	2002	2003	2004	2005	2006	2007	SR	W–L	Win%
Grand Slam tournaments
Australian Open	Q2	A	A	Q1	3R	2R	2R	Q3	A	A	A	0 / 3	4–3	57%
French Open	A	A	A	3R	1R	2R	1R	Q1	A	A	Q1	0 / 4	3–4	43%
Wimbledon	A	A	A	A	1R	4R	1R	Q2	A	A	Q1	0 / 3	3–3	50%
US Open	A	A	A	1R	1R	1R	A	Q1	A	A	Q1	0 / 3	0–3	0%
Win–loss	0–0	0–0	0–0	2–2	2–4	5–4	1–3	0–0	0–0	0–0	0–0	0 / 13	10–13	43%
ATP Tour Masters 1000
Indian Wells	A	A	A	Q1	Q2	2R	1R	A	A	A	A	0 / 2	1–2	33%
Miami	A	A	A	3R	1R	1R	1R	Q1	A	A	A	0 / 4	2–4	33%
Monte Carlo	A	A	A	A	Q1	2R	A	A	A	A	A	0 / 1	1–1	50%
Rome	A	A	A	A	A	2R	A	A	A	A	A	0 / 1	1–1	50%
Hamburg	A	A	A	Q1	Q1	1R	A	A	A	A	A	0 / 1	0–1	0%
Canada	A	A	A	A	A	1R	A	1R	A	A	A	0 / 2	0–2	0%
Cincinnati	A	A	A	A	A	1R	A	1R	A	A	A	0 / 2	0–2	0%
Madrid	Not Masters Series					1R	Q1	A	A	A	A	0 / 1	0–1	0%
Paris	A	A	A	A	A	1R	A	A	A	A	A	0 / 1	0–1	0%
Win–loss	0–0	0–0	0–0	2–1	0–1	3–9	0–2	0–2	0–0	0–0	0–0	0 / 15	5–15	25%
