= Jens Knippschild =

German tennis player (born 1975)

- Country (sports): Germany
- Residence: Arolsen, Germany
- Born: 15 February 1975 (age 51) Bad Arolsen, West Germany
- Height: 1.91 m (6 ft 3 in)
- Turned pro: 1992
- Retired: 2004
- Plays: Right-handed (one-handed backhand)
- Prize money: $1,017,972

Singles
- Career record: 48–69
- Career titles: 0
- Highest ranking: No. 76 (9 August 1999)

Grand Slam singles results
- Australian Open: 3R (1997)
- French Open: 4R (1998)
- Wimbledon: 3R (1999)
- US Open: 3R (1997)

Doubles
- Career record: 46–53
- Career titles: 2
- Highest ranking: No. 53 (9 June 1997)

Grand Slam doubles results
- Australian Open: 3R (2001)
- French Open: QF (1997)
- Wimbledon: 3R (1997)
- US Open: 3R (2000)

Jens Knippschild (born 15 February 1975) is a former tennis player from Germany, who turned professional in 1992. In his career, he won two doubles titles (2001, Båstad and 2002, Bucharest). The right-hander reached his highest singles ranking by the ATP on 9 August 1999, when he became the No. 76 of the world.

== ATP Tour finals ==
=== Singles: 1 (runner-up) ===
Legend Grand Slam tournaments ATP Championship Series ATP World Series (0–1)	Finals by surface Hard (0–0) Clay (0–0) Grass (0–1)	Finals by setting Outdoors (0–1) Indoors (0–0)

Result	W–L	Date	Tournament	Tier	Surface	Opponent	Score
Loss	0–1	Jul 2000	Newport, United States	International Series	Grass	(Netherlands) Peter Wessels	6–7^{(3–7)}, 3–6

=== Doubles: 3 (2 titles, 1 runner-up) ===
Legend Grand Slam tournaments ATP Championship Series ATP World Series (2–1)	Finals by surface Hard (0–0) Clay (2–1) Grass (0–0)	Finals by setting Outdoors (2–1) Indoors (0–0)

Result	W–L	Date	Tournament	Tier	Surface	Partner	Opponents	Score
Loss	0–1	May 1997	Munich, Germany	World Series	Clay	(Germany) Karsten Braasch	(Argentina) Pablo Albano (Spain) Àlex Corretja	6–3, 5–7, 2–6
Win	1–1	Jul 2001	Båstad, Sweden	International Series	Clay	(Germany) Karsten Braasch	(Sweden) Simon Aspelin (Australia) Andrew Kratzmann	7–6^{(7–3)}, 4–6, 7–6^{(7–5)}
Win	2–1	Sep 2002	Bucharest, Romania	International Series	Clay	(Sweden) Peter Nyborg	(Spain) Emilio Benfele Álvarez (Argentina) Andrés Schneiter	6–3, 6–3

== ATP Challenger and ITF Futures finals ==
=== Singles: 10 (5–5) ===
Legend ATP Challenger (5–4) ITF Futures (0–1)	Finals by surface Hard (0–1) Clay (2–4) Carpet (3–0)

Result	W–L	Date	Tournament	Tier	Surface	Opponent	Score
Loss	0–1	Jun 1994	Weiden, Germany	Challenger	Clay	(Sweden) Mikael Tillström	2–6, 4–6
Win	1–1	Feb 1996	Lübeck, Germany	Challenger	Carpet	(Germany) Nicolas Kiefer	7–6, 6–1
Win	2–1	Jul 1996	Oberstaufen, Germany	Challenger	Clay	(Chile) Gabriel Silberstein	6–3, 5–7, 7–6
Loss	2–2	Sep 1996	Bad Saarow, Germany	Challenger	Clay	(Sweden) Magnus Norman	2–6, 2–6
Win	3–2	Feb 1997	Wolfsburg, Germany	Challenger	Carpet	(Germany) Arne Thoms	6–4, 6–3
Loss	3–3	Sep 1998	Szczecin, Poland	Challenger	Clay	(Morocco) Younes El Aynaoui	3–6, 4–6
Win	4–3	Jun 1999	Braunschweig, Germany	Challenger	Clay	(Argentina) Franco Squillari	7–5, 7–6^{(8–6)}
Win	5–3	Oct 2000	Eckental, Germany	Challenger	Carpet	(France) Olivier Mutis	6–7^{(5–7)}, 7–6^{(7–4)}, 7–5
Loss	5–4	Aug 2001	Mönchengladbach, Germany	Challenger	Clay	(Austria) Jürgen Melzer	6–4, 1–6, 3–6
Loss	5–5	Oct 2002	France F20, Saint-Dizier	Futures	Hard	(Czech Republic) Martin Štěpánek	walkover

=== Doubles: 20 (15–5) ===
Legend ATP Challenger (14–5) ITF Futures (1–0)	Finals by surface Hard (1–0) Clay (12–3) Carpet (2–2)

Result	W–L	Date	Tournament	Tier	Surface	Partner	Opponents	Score
Loss	0–1	Jun 1996	Eisenach, Germany	Challenger	Clay	(Germany) Karsten Braasch	(United States) Donald Johnson (United States) Francisco Montana	3–6, 2–6
Win	1–1	Jun 1996	Braunschweig, Germany	Challenger	Clay	(Germany) Karsten Braasch	(Italy) Cristian Brandi (Italy) Filippo Messori	6–3, 6–4
Win	2–1	Jul 1996	Ulm, Germany	Challenger	Clay	(Germany) Karsten Braasch	(Soviet Union) Ģirts Dzelde (North Macedonia) Aleksandar Kitinov	7–5, 6–3
Win	3–1	Jul 1996	Oberstaufen, Germany	Challenger	Clay	(Germany) Karsten Braasch	(France) Maxime Huard (France) Guillaume Marx	6–2, 6–4
Win	4–1	Aug 1996	Geneva, Switzerland	Challenger	Clay	(Germany) Patrick Baur	(Switzerland) George Bastl (Switzerland) Michel Kratochvil	6–1, 6–1
Win	5–1	Sep 1996	Alpirsbach, Germany	Challenger	Clay	(Germany) Karsten Braasch	(Soviet Union) Ģirts Dzelde (Sweden) Tomas Nydahl	1–6, 6–3, 7–5
Win	6–1	Sep 1996	Bad Saarow, Germany	Challenger	Clay	(South Africa) Marcos Ondruska	(South Africa) Paul Rosner (Netherlands) Joost Winnink	6–3, 6–3
Loss	6–2	Nov 1996	Neumünster, Germany	Challenger	Carpet	(Germany) Patrick Baur	(Netherlands) Stephen Noteboom (Netherlands) Fernon Wibier	3–6, 4–6
Win	7–2	Apr 1998	Espinho, Portugal	Challenger	Clay	(Netherlands) Stephen Noteboom	(Spain) Alberto Martín (Czech Republic) Tomas Anzari	7–6, 7–5
Win	8–2	Aug 1998	Geneva, Switzerland	Challenger	Clay	(Sweden) Rikard Bergh	(Czech Republic) Michal Tabara (Czech Republic) Radomír Vašek	6–2, 3–6, 6–4
Loss	8–3	Jul 1999	Oberstaufen, Germany	Challenger	Clay	(Germany) Karsten Braasch	(Netherlands) Edwin Kempes (Czech Republic) Petr Luxa	5–7, 4–6
Win	9–3	Dec 1999	Numbrecht, Germany	Challenger	Carpet	(Germany) Dirk Dier	(Germany) Andreas Tattermusch (Germany) Andreas Weber	6–3, 7–5
Win	10–3	Jun 2000	Braunschweig, Germany	Challenger	Clay	(United States) Jeff Tarango	(Spain) Álex López Morón (Spain) Albert Portas	6–2, 6–2
Loss	10–4	Oct 2000	Barcelona, Spain	Challenger	Clay	(Germany) Marcus Hilpert	(Spain) Tomás Carbonell (Spain) Albert Portas	7–5, 1–6, 4–6
Win	11–4	Oct 2000	Eckental, Germany	Challenger	Carpet	(Germany) Karsten Braasch	(Switzerland) Ivo Heuberger (Germany) Michael Kohlmann	7–6^{(7–5)}, 6–3
Loss	11–5	Feb 2001	Hamburg, Germany	Challenger	Carpet	(Germany) Karsten Braasch	(Austria) Julian Knowle (Switzerland) Lorenzo Manta	3–6, 6–7^{(4–7)}
Win	12–5	Jun 2001	Braunschweig, Germany	Challenger	Clay	(Germany) Karsten Braasch	(Spain) Feliciano López (Spain) Francisco Roig	6–1, 6–1
Win	13–5	Aug 2001	Mönchengladbach, Germany	Challenger	Clay	(Spain) Jairo Velasco	(Belgium) Wim Neefs (Netherlands) Djalmar Sistermans	6–3, 6–3
Win	14–5	Jun 2002	Weiden, Germany	Challenger	Clay	(Serbia and Montenegro) Dušan Vemić	(Argentina) Sergio Roitman (Argentina) Andrés Schneiter	7–6^{(7–5)}, 6–2
Win	15–5	Jan 2004	Germany F2, Stuttgart	Futures	Hard	(Sweden) Robert Lindstedt	(Russia) Dmitri Vlasov (Croatia) Lovro Zovko	6–7^{(5–7)}, 6–3, 6–3

== Performance timelines ==
Key
W	F	SF	QF	#R	RR	Q#	DNQ	A	NH

(W) winner; (F) finalist; (SF) semifinalist; (QF) quarterfinalist; (#R) rounds 4, 3, 2, 1; (RR) round-robin stage; (Q#) qualification round; (DNQ) did not qualify; (A) absent; (NH) not held; (SR) strike rate (events won / competed); (W–L) win–loss record.

=== Singles ===
Tournament	1993	1994	1995	1996	1997	1998	1999	2000	2001	2002	SR	W–L	Win %
Grand Slam tournaments
Australian Open	A	A	A	A	3R	1R	2R	1R	1R	A	0 / 5	3–5	38%
French Open	A	A	Q2	A	2R	4R	2R	A	2R	2R	0 / 5	7–5	58%
Wimbledon	A	A	A	A	2R	1R	3R	A	1R	A	0 / 4	3–4	43%
US Open	A	A	A	A	3R	A	1R	2R	A	A	0 / 3	3–3	50%
Win–loss	0–0	0–0	0–0	0–0	6–4	3–3	4–4	1–2	1–3	1–1	0 / 17	16–17	48%
ATP World Tour Masters 1000
Miami	A	A	A	A	A	A	A	Q1	A	A	0 / 0	0–0	–
Monte Carlo	A	A	A	A	Q1	A	A	A	A	A	0 / 0	0–0	–
Hamburg	Q1	Q2	Q1	A	1R	3R	Q2	Q1	1R	Q1	0 / 3	2–3	40%
Stuttgart	A	A	A	A	A	A	A	1R	A	NH	0 / 1	0–1	0%
Win–loss	0–0	0–0	0–0	0–0	0–1	2–1	0–0	0–1	0–1	0–0	0 / 4	2–4	33%

=== Doubles ===
Tournament	1995	1996	1997	1998	1999	2000	2001	2002	SR	W–L	Win %
Grand Slam tournaments
Australian Open	A	A	1R	1R	1R	A	3R	A	0 / 4	2–4	33%
French Open	A	A	QF	3R	A	A	2R	1R	0 / 4	6–4	60%
Wimbledon	A	A	3R	2R	A	A	1R	A	0 / 3	3–3	50%
US Open	A	A	2R	A	A	3R	A	A	0 / 2	3–2	60%
Win–loss	0–0	0–0	6–4	3–3	0–1	2–1	3–3	0–1	0 / 13	14–13	52%
ATP World Tour Masters 1000
Monte Carlo	A	A	Q1	A	A	A	A	A	0 / 0	0–0	–
Hamburg	1R	A	2R	2R	2R	2R	1R	1R	0 / 7	4–7	36%
Stuttgart	A	A	A	A	A	1R	A	NH	0 / 1	0–1	0%
Win–loss	0–1	0–0	1–1	1–1	1–1	1–2	0–1	0–1	0 / 8	4–8	33%
