= 2000 Hamburg Masters =

- Date: 15–21 May
- Edition: 94th
- Category: ATP Masters Series
- Draw: 64S / 32D
- Prize money: $2,450,000
- Surface: Clay / outdoor
- Location: Hamburg, Germany
- Venue: Rothenbaum Tennis Center

Champions

Singles
- (Brazil) Gustavo Kuerten

Doubles
- (Australia) Todd Woodbridge / (Australia) Mark Woodforde
← 1999 ·	Hamburg Masters	· 2001 →

The 2000 Hamburg Masters was a men's tennis tournament played on outdoor clay courts. It was the 94th edition of the Hamburg Masters, and was part of the ATP Masters Series of the 2000 ATP Tour. It took place at the Rothenbaum Tennis Center in Hamburg, Germany, from 15 May until 21 May 2000. Fifth-seeded Gustavo Kuerten won the singles title.

== Finals ==
=== Singles ===
(Brazil) Gustavo Kuerten defeated (Russia) Marat Safin 6–4, 5–7, 6–4, 5–7, 7–6^{(7–3)}

- It was Kuerten's 2nd title of the year, and his 7th overall. It was his 1st Masters title of the year, and his 3rd overall.

=== Doubles ===
(Australia) Todd Woodbridge / (Australia) Mark Woodforde defeated (Australia) Wayne Arthurs / (Australia) Sandon Stolle, 6–7^{(4–7)}, 6–4, 6–3
