= Christian Vinck =

German tennis player

- Country (sports): Germany
- Residence: Hamm, Germany
- Born: 3 September 1975 (age 50) Hamm, Germany
- Height: 1.83 m (6 ft 0 in)
- Turned pro: 1993
- Plays: Left-handed
- Prize money: $482,534

Singles
- Career record: 17–48
- Highest ranking: No. 101 (12 February 2001)

Grand Slam singles results
- Australian Open: 1R (2001)
- French Open: 2R (2000)
- Wimbledon: 3R (2000)
- US Open: 1R (2000)

Doubles
- Career record: 0–3
- Highest ranking: No. 530 (9 February 1998)

Christian Vinck (born 3 September 1975) is a German former professional tennis player.

Vinck reached his highest individual ranking on the ATP Tour on 12 February 2001, when he became World number 101. He played primarily on the Challenger circuit.

Vinck's best performance in a grand slam event came at Wimbledon in 2000, when he made it to the third round.

== Career tour finals ==
=== Singles (4 titles) ===
Legend (singles)
Grand Slam (0)
Tennis Masters Cup (0)
ATP Masters Series (0)
ATP Tour (0)
Challengers (4)

No.	Date	Tournament	Surface	Opponent in the final	Score
1.	10 November 1997	Las Vegas	Hard	(United States) Andre Agassi	6–2, 7–5
2.	8 December 1997	Wismar	Carpet	(Switzerland) Ivo Heuberger	6–2, 7–6
3.	30 November 1998	Nümbrecht	Carpet	(Netherlands) Peter Wessels	6–7, 6–4, 6–4
4.	14 February 2000	Lübeck	Carpet	(Germany) Andy Fahlke	6–3, 6–1
