= Andy Fahlke =

German former professional tennis player

- Country (sports): Germany
- Born: 30 May 1979 (age 46) Hamburg, West Germany
- Height: 185 cm (6 ft 1 in)
- Turned pro: 1996
- Prize money: $62,211

Singles
- Career record: 0–1
- Highest ranking: No. 181 (21 February 2000)

Grand Slam singles results
- Australian Open: Q1 (2000, 2001)
- French Open: Q2 (2000)
- Wimbledon: Q1 (1998, 2000)

Doubles
- Career record: 0–1
- Highest ranking: No. 284 (7 May 2001)

Andy Fahlke (born 30 May 1979) is a German former professional tennis player.

== Biography ==
A right-handed player from Hamburg, Fahlke was one of four tennis playing brothers, who were coached by their father Gerhard while growing up.

Fahlke turned professional in 1996 and went on to reach a best singles ranking of 181 in the world, with qualifying appearances at the Australian Open, French Open and Wimbledon.

Most of his career was spent on the Challenger circuit, where he made three singles finals, but in 2000 he featured in the main draw of two ATP Tour tournaments. At the 2000 BMW Open in Munich he received a wildcard into the singles event and was beaten in the first round by Ivan Ljubičić, who he then partnered with in the doubles main draw at the 2000 Hamburg Masters.

In 2006 he was briefly the coach of Russian tennis player Nadia Petrova.

Fahlke now works as a psychotherapist in Appenweier.
