= Tennis at the 1999 Pan American Games – Men's doubles =

Men's doubles at the 1999 Pan American Games was won by André Sá and Paulo Taicher of Brazil.

== Medalists ==
Gold	(Brazil) André Sá and Paulo Taicher
Silver	(Mexico) Óscar Ortiz and Marco Osorio
Bronze	(United States) Bob Bryan and Mike Bryan
Bronze	(Venezuela) Yohny Romero and Maurice Ruah

== Seeds ==
1. (United States) Bob Bryan and Mike Bryan (Semifinalists)
2. (Brazil) André Sá and Paulo Taicher (Champions)
3. (Mexico) Óscar Ortíz and Marco Osorio (Finalists)
4. (Venezuela) Yohny Romero and Maurice Ruah (Semifinalists)

== Draw ==
=== Final rounds ===
Semifinals
1	(United States) Bob Bryan / Mike Bryan	4	4
3	(Mexico) Óscar Ortíz / Marco Osorio	6	6
4	(Venezuela) Yohny Romero / Maurice Ruah	6	4	3
2	(Brazil) André Sá / Paulo Taicher	3	6	6

Final
3	(Mexico) Óscar Ortíz / Marco Osorio	6	2
2	(Brazil) André Sá / Paulo Taicher	7	6

=== Top half ===
First Round
1	(United States) B Bryan / M Bryan
bye
bye
(Uruguay) F Dondo / G Rodríguez
(Trinidad and Tobago) S Evelyn / S Stone
bye
bye
(Chile) H Gamonal / A García
3	(Mexico) Ó Ortiz / M Osorio
bye
bye
(Cuba) S Martínez / L Navarro
(Argentina) G Coria / D Nalbandian
(Saint Vincent and the Grenadines) D Grant / A Talbert	w/o
(Antigua and Barbuda) A Fitzroy / G Williams	4	6
(Jamaica) N Gordon / J Smith	6	7

Second Round
1	(United States) B Bryan / M Bryan	6	6
(Uruguay) F Dondo / G Rodríguez	3	2
(Trinidad and Tobago) S Evelyn / S Stone	3	6	6
(Chile) H Gamonal / A García	6	4	3
3	(Mexico) Ó Ortiz / M Osorio	6	3	6
(Cuba) S Martínez / L Navarro	2	6	2
(Argentina) G Coria / D Nalbandian	6	6
(Jamaica) N Gordon / J Smith	2	3

Quarterfinals
1	(United States) B Bryan / M Bryan	6	6
(Trinidad and Tobago) S Evelyn / S Stone	2	1
3	(Mexico) Ó Ortiz / M Osorio	6	7
(Argentina) G Coria / D Nalbandian	4	6

Semifinals
1	(United States) B Bryan / M Bryan	4	4
3	(Mexico) Ó Ortiz / M Osorio	6	6

=== Bottom half ===
First Round
(Dominican Republic) S Camacho / J García
bye
(United States Virgin Islands) E Highfield / J Richard
(Paraguay) E Baez / F Insaurrealde
bye
bye
4	(Venezuela) Y Romero / M Ruah
(Canada) D Abelson / D Critchley
bye
bye
(Colombia) C Alvarado / D Ramírez
(Haiti) C Barthold / E Lacombe
bye
bye
2	(Brazil) A Sá / P Taicher

Second Round
(Dominican Republic) S Camacho / J García	6	6
(United States Virgin Islands) E Highfield / J Richard	4	4
(Paraguay) E Baez / F Insaurrealde	2	1
4	(Venezuela) Y Romero / M Ruah	6	6
(Canada) D Abelson / D Critchley
(Colombia) C Alvarado / D Ramírez	w/o
(Haiti) C Barthold / E Lacombe	0	1
2	(Brazil) A Sá / P Taicher	6	6

Quarterfinals
(Dominican Republic) S Camacho / J García	4	2
4	(Venezuela) Y Romero / M Ruah	6	6
(Canada) D Abelson / D Critchley	6	3	5
2	(Brazil) A Sá / P Taicher	3	6	7

Semifinals
4	(Venezuela) Y Romero / M Ruah	6	4	3
2	(Brazil) A Sá / P Taicher	3	6	6
