= Tennis at the 1999 Pan American Games – Men's singles =

Men's singles at the 1999 Pan American Games was won by Paul Goldstein of the United States.

== Medalists ==
| Gold | (United States) Paul Goldstein |
| Silver | (United States) Cecil Mamiit |
| Bronze | (Argentina) David Nalbandian |
| Bronze | (Brazil) Paulo Taicher |

== Seeds ==
1. (United States) Cecil Mamiit (finalist)
2. (United States) Paul Goldstein (champion)
3. (Brazil) André Sá (third round)
4. (Venezuela) Maurice Ruah (third round)
5. (United States) Bob Bryan (quarterfinalist)
6. (Brazil) Paulo Taicher (semifinalist)
7. (Uruguay) Federico Dondo (quarterfinalist)
8. (Brazil) Daniel Melo (quarterfinalist)
9. (Chile) Hermes Gamonal (third round)
10. (Venezuela) Yohny Romero (third round)
11. (Cuba) Lázaro Navarro-Batles (third round)
12. (Mexico) Marco Osorio (third round)
13. (Mexico) Óscar Ortíz (quarterfinalist)
14. (Argentina) David Nalbandian (semifinalist)
15. (Argentina) Edgardo Massa (third round)
16. (Chile) Adrián García (third round)

== Draw ==
=== Final rounds ===
Quarterfinals
1 | (United States) Cecil Mamiit | 4 | 6 | 6
7 | (Uruguay) Federico Dondo | 6 | 3 | 1
14 | (Argentina) David Nalbandian | 7 | 6
5 | (United States) Bob Bryan | 5 | 4
6 | (Brazil) Paulo Taicher | 7 | 6
13 | (Mexico) Óscar Ortiz | 6 | 4
8 | (Brazil) Daniel Melo | 4 | 4
2 | (United States) Paul Goldstein | 6 | 6

Semifinals
1 | (United States) Cecil Mamiit | 4 | 6 | 6
14 | (Argentina) David Nalbandian | 6 | 3 | 1
6 | (Brazil) Paulo Taicher | 4 | 4
2 | (United States) Paul Goldstein | 6 | 6

Final
1 | (United States) Cecil Mamiit | 4 | 4
2 | (United States) Paul Goldstein | 6 | 6

=== Earlier rounds ===
==== Section 1 ====
First round
(Trinidad and Tobago) S Evelyn | 6 | 6
(Saint Vincent and the Grenadines) A Talbert | 1 | 1
(Cuba) S Martínez | 6 | 6
(United States Virgin Islands) J Richards III | 0 | 2
(Canada) D Abelson | 6 | 6
(British Virgin Islands) S Walters | 0 | 2
(Antigua and Barbuda) F Anthony | 1 | 2
(Barbados) B Frost | 6 | 6

Second round
1 | (United States) C Mamiit | 6 | 6
(Trinidad and Tobago) S Evelyn | 3 | 4
(Cuba) S Martinez | 2 | 3
16 | (Chile) A Garcia
10 | (Venezuela) Y Romero | 5 | 6 | 7
(Canada) D Abelson | 7 | 1 | 5
(Barbados) B Frost | 2 | 3
7 | (Uruguay) F Dondo | 6 | 6

Third round
1 | (United States) C Mamiit | 6 | 7
16 | (Chile) A Garcia | 2 | 6
10 | (Venezuela) Y Romero | 1 | 6
7 | (Uruguay) F Dondo | 6 | 7

Quarterfinals
1 | (United States) C Mamiit | 4 | 6 | 6
7 | (Uruguay) F Dondo | 6 | 3 | 1

==== Section 2 ====
First round
(Canada) D Critchley | 6 | 6
(Dominican Republic) R Vallejo | 0 | 3
(Jamaica) N Gordon
(Colombia) D Ramírez | w/o

Second round
3 | (Brazil) A Sa | 6 | 6
(Canada) D Critchley | 4 | 4
(Jamaica) N Gordon | 2 | 2
14 | (Argentina) D Nalbandian | 6 | 6
12 | (Mexico) M Osorio | 6 | 6
(Haiti) C Barthold | 4 | 1
(Paraguay) F Insaurralde | 1 | 1
5 | (United States) B Bryan | 6 | 6

Third round
3 | (Brazil) A Sa | 6 | 3 | 4
14 | (Argentina) D Nalbandian | 1 | 6 | 6
12 | (Mexico) M Osorio | 2 | 3
5 | (United States) B Bryan | 6 | 6

Quarterfinals
14 | (Argentina) D Nalbandian | 7 | 6
5 | (United States) B Bryan | 5 | 4

==== Section 3 ====
First round
(Dominican Republic) S Camacho | 6 | 6
(Saint Vincent and the Grenadines) D Grant | 0 | 3
(Argentina) G Coria | 6 | 6
(Uruguay) G Rodríguez | 2 | 3

Second round
6 | (Brazil) P Taicher | 7 | 6
(Canada) D Boulet | 6 | 4
(Antigua and Barbuda) G Williams | 2 | 1
11 | (Cuba) L Navarro-Batles | 6 | 6
13 | (Mexico) O Ortiz | 6 | 6
(Dominican Republic) S Camacho | 3 | 2
(Argentina) G Coria | 1 | 6
4 | (Venezuela) M Ruah | 6 | 7

Third round
6 | (Brazil) P Taicher | 6 | 6
11 | (Cuba) L Navarro-Batles | 4 | 4
13 | (Mexico) O Ortiz | 5 | 7 | 6
4 | (Venezuela) M Ruah | 7 | 6 | 3

Quarterfinals
(Brazil) P Taicher | 7 | 6
(Mexico) O Ortiz | 6 | 4

==== Section 4 ====
First round
(Colombia) C Alvarado | w/o
(Trinidad and Tobago) S Stone
(Bolivia) J Antelo | 1 | 4
(Dominican Republic) J Garcia | 6 | 6
(United States Virgin Islands) E Highfield | 7 | 6
(Haiti) P Lacombe | 6 | 2
(Paraguay) E Baez-Britez | 1 | 5
(Jamaica) J Smith | 6 | 7

Second round
8 | (Brazil) D Melo | 6 | 6
(Trinidad and Tobago) S Stone | 2 | 0
(Dominican Republic) J Garcia | 4 | 2
9 | (Chile) H Gamonal | 6 | 6
15 | (Argentina) E Massa | 6 | 6
(United States Virgin Islands) E Highfield | 3 | 1
(Jamaica) J Smith | 5 | 0
2 | (United States) P Goldstein | 7 | 6

Third round
8 | (Brazil) D Melo | 6 | 6
9 | (Chile) H Gamonal | 3 | 3
15 | (Argentina) E Massa | 4 | 6
2 | (United States) P Goldstein | 6 | 7

Quarterfinals
8 | (Brazil) D Melo | 4 | 4
2 | (United States) P Goldstein | 6 | 6
