= 1998 ATP Challenger Series =

Tennis tour

Details
- Duration: 26 January 1998 – 4 January 1999
- Edition: 21st
- Tournaments: 114

Achievements (singles)

The ATP Challenger Series is the second tier tour for professional tennis organised by the Association of Tennis Professionals (ATP). The 1998 ATP Challenger Series calendar comprised 114 tournaments, with prize money ranging from $25,000 up to $125,000.

== Schedule ==
=== January ===
| Date | Country | Tournament | Prizemoney | Surface | Singles champion | Doubles champions |
|---|---|---|---|---|---|---|
| 26.01. | Germany | Heilbronn Open | $ 100,000 | Carpet (i) | (Germany) Martin Sinner | (United States) Geoff Grant (United States) Mark Merklein |

=== February ===
| Date | Country | Tournament | Prizemoney | Surface | Singles champion | Doubles champions |
|---|---|---|---|---|---|---|
| 02.02. | South Africa | West Bloomfield Challenger | $ 50,000 | Hard (i) | (United States) Alex O'Brien | (United States) Jim Thomas (Italy) Laurence Tieleman |
| 02.02. | Germany | Lippstadt Challenger | $ 25,000 | Carpet (i) | (Germany) Dirk Dier | (United Kingdom) Andrew Richardson (South Africa) Myles Wakefield |
| 09.02. | Germany | Volkswagen Challenger | $ 25,000 | Carpet (i) | (Switzerland) Ivo Heuberger | (Russia) Marat Safin (Federal Republic of Yugoslavia) Dušan Vemić |
| 16.02. | Singapore | Singapore Challenger | $ 50,000 | Hard | (Spain) Fernando Vicente | (United States) Jim Thomas (Italy) Laurence Tieleman |
| 16.02. | Germany | Warsteiner Challenger Lübeck | $ 25,000 | Carpet (i) | (Netherlands) Peter Wessels | (Switzerland) Lorenzo Manta (United Kingdom) Andrew Richardson |
| 23.02. | Vietnam | Ho Chi Minh Challenger | $ 50,000 | Hard | (Brazil) André Sá | (India) Mahesh Bhupathi (Australia) Peter Tramacchi |
| 23.02. | France | Cherbourg Challenger | $ 25,000 | Hard (i) | (France) Jérôme Golmard | (Italy) Massimo Ardinghi (Italy) Massimo Bertolini |

=== March ===
| Date | Country | Tournament | Prizemoney | Surface | Singles champion | Doubles champions |
|---|---|---|---|---|---|---|
| 02.03. | Thailand | Bangkok Challenger | $ 50,000 | Hard | (India) Leander Paes | (Australia) Peter Tramacchi (Zimbabwe) Kevin Ullyett |
| 02.03. | Germany | Residenza Open Magdeburg | $ 25,000 | Carpet (i) | (Germany) Lars Burgsmüller | (Israel) Eyal Erlich (Italy) Mosé Navarra |
| 09.03. | Ecuador | Salinas Challenger | $ 50,000 | Hard | (Brazil) André Sá | (United States) David DiLucia (United States) Michael Sell |
| 09.03. | Japan | Kyoto Challenger | $ 25,000 | Carpet (i) | (Germany) Michael Kohlmann | (Japan) Takao Suzuki (Zimbabwe) Kevin Ullyett |
| 30.03. | Italy | Barletta Challenger | $ 25,000 | Clay | (Argentina) Francisco Cabello | (Spain) Joan Balcells (Spain) Juan Ignacio Carrasco |

=== April ===
| Date | Country | Tournament | Prizemoney | Surface | Singles champion | Doubles champions |
|---|---|---|---|---|---|---|
| 06.04. | Bermuda | XL Bermuda Open | $ 100,000 | Clay | (Argentina) Hernán Gumy | (United States) Doug Flach (United States) Richey Reneberg |
| 06.04. | Italy | Napoli Challenger | $ 100,000 | Clay | (Italy) Davide Sanguinetti | (Italy) Massimo Bertolini (United States) Devin Bowen |
| 06.04. | Mexico | San Luis Potosí Challenger | $ 25,000 | Clay | (Ecuador) Luis Morejón | (Netherlands) Edwin Kempes (Netherlands) Peter Wessels |
| 13.04. | France | Nice Challenger | $ 100,000 | Clay | (Argentina) Mariano Puerta | (United States) Devin Bowen (Argentina) Mariano Hood |
| 13.04. | United States | Birmingham Challenger | $ 50,000 | Clay | (Norway) Christian Ruud | (United States) Doug Flach (United States) David Witt |
| 13.04. | India | Vadodara Challenger | $ 50,000 | Grass | (Australia) Peter Tramacchi | (South Africa) Myles Wakefield (South Africa) Wesley Whitehouse |
| 13.04. | Mexico | Puerto Vallarta Challenger | $ 25,000 | Hard (i) | (United States) Geoff Grant | (Mexico) Luis Herrera (Romania) Gabriel Trifu |
| 20.04. | Portugal | Espinho Challenger | $ 125,000 | Clay | (Argentina) Guillermo Cañas | (Germany) Jens Knippschild (Netherlands) Stephen Noteboom |
| 20.04. | Czech Republic | Prague Challenger | $ 25,000 | Clay | (Czech Republic) Michal Tabara | (Spain) Joan Balcells (Federal Republic of Yugoslavia) Nenad Zimonjić |

=== May ===
| Date | Country | Tournament | Prizemoney | Surface | Singles champion | Doubles champions |
|---|---|---|---|---|---|---|
| 04.05. | Slovenia | Ljubljana Challenger | $ 125,000 | Clay | (Romania) Dinu Pescariu | (South Africa) Marius Barnard (Netherlands) Stephen Noteboom |
| 04.05. | Israel | Jerusalem Challenger | $ 50,000 | Hard | (South Africa) Neville Godwin | (Israel) Noam Behr (Israel) Eyal Erlich |
| 11.05. | Czech Republic | Košice Challenger | $ 125,000 | Clay | (Slovakia) Dominik Hrbatý | (Czech Republic) Jiří Novák (Czech Republic) David Rikl |
| 11.05. | Germany | Ostdeutscher Sparkassen Cup | $ 50,000 | Clay | (Germany) Dirk Dier | (Argentina) Pablo Albano (Netherlands) Sander Groen |
| 18.05. | Hungary | Budapest Challenger I | $ 50,000 | Clay | (South Africa) Marcos Ondruska | (South Africa) Chris Haggard (South Africa) Paul Rosner |
| 25.05. | Ukraine | Kyiv Challenger | $ 50,000 | Clay | (Federal Republic of Yugoslavia) Nenad Zimonjić | (Austria) Thomas Buchmayer (Austria) Thomas Strengberger |
| 25.05. | Colombia | Medellín Challenger | $ 25,000 | Clay | (Brazil) Adriano Ferreira | (Brazil) Adriano Ferreira (Brazil) Cristiano Testa |

=== June ===
| Date | Country | Tournament | Prizemoney | Surface | Singles champion | Doubles champions |
|---|---|---|---|---|---|---|
| 01.06. | Czech Republic | Prostějov Challenger | $ 125,000 | Clay | (Australia) Richard Fromberg | (Netherlands) Edwin Kempes (Netherlands) Peter Wessels |
| 01.06. | Germany | Quelle Cup | $ 50,000 | Clay | (Norway) Christian Ruud | (Spain) Álex López Morón (Spain) Albert Portas |
| 01.06. | Great Britain | Surbiton Challenger | $ 50,000 | Grass | (Italy) Gianluca Pozzi | (Australia) Sandon Stolle (Australia) Peter Tramacchi |
| 08.06. | Croatia | Split Challenger | $ 100,000 | Clay | (Bulgaria) Orlin Stanoytchev | (United States) Geoff Grant (Hungary) Attila Sávolt |
| 08.06. | Germany | ATU Cup | $ 25,000 | Clay | (Argentina) Agustín Calleri | (Portugal) Nuno Marques (Federal Republic of Yugoslavia) Nenad Zimonjić |
| 15.06. | Germany | Nord/LB Open | $ 125,000 | Clay | (Argentina) Franco Squillari | (Spain) Tomás Carbonell (Spain) Francisco Roig |
| 15.06. | Croatia | Zagreb Challenger | $ 100,000 | Clay | (Czech Republic) Jiří Novák | (Spain) Julián Alonso (Argentina) Mariano Puerta |
| 22.06. | Italy | Biella Challenger | $ 25,000 | Clay | (Australia) Andrew Ilie | (Argentina) Diego del Río (United States) Eric Taino |
| 22.06. | Germany | Wartburg Open | $ 25,000 | Clay | (Netherlands) Edwin Kempes | (Brazil) Jaime Oncins (Brazil) Cristiano Testa |
| 22.06. | Czech Republic | Příbram Challenger | $ 25,000 | Clay | (France) Arnaud Di Pasquale | (Czech Republic) Ota Fukárek (Austria) Udo Plamberger |
| 29.06. | Italy | Venice Challenger | $ 100,000 | Clay | (Romania) Adrian Voinea | (Federal Republic of Yugoslavia) Nebojša Đorđević (South Africa) Marcos Ondruska |
| 29.06. | United States | Denver Challenger | $ 50,000 | Hard | (Japan) Takao Suzuki | (Australia) Michael Hill (United States) Glenn Weiner |
| 29.06. | Germany | Müller Cup | $ 50,000 | Clay | (Morocco) Younes El Aynaoui | (Brazil) Márcio Carlsson (Brazil) Jaime Oncins |
| 29.06. | France | Montauban Challenger | $ 25,000 | Clay | (Netherlands) Edwin Kempes | (Spain) Eduardo Nicolás (Spain) Germán Puentes |

=== July ===
| Date | Country | Tournament | Prizemoney | Surface | Singles champion | Doubles champions |
|---|---|---|---|---|---|---|
| 06.07. | Belgium | Ostend Challenger | $ 75,000 | Clay | (Australia) Andrew Ilie | (Italy) Cristian Brandi (Italy) Filippo Messori |
| 06.07. | Great Britain | Bristol Challenger | $ 50,000 | Grass | (Belgium) Denis van Uffelen | (Belarus) Max Mirnyi (Belarus) Vladimir Voltchkov |
| 06.07. | Canada | Granby Challenger | $ 50,000 | Hard | (Japan) Takao Suzuki | (Japan) Gouichi Motomura (Japan) Takao Suzuki |
| 06.07. | Germany | Oberstaufen Cup | $ 25,000 | Clay | (Austria) Wolfgang Schranz | (Portugal) Nuno Marques (Netherlands) Rogier Wassen |
| 13.07. | Italy | Merano Challenger | $ 125,000 | Clay | (Czech Republic) Ctislav Doseděl | (Argentina) Pablo Albano (Ecuador) Nicolás Lapentti |
| 13.07. | United States | Aptos Challenger | $ 50,000 | Hard | (United States) Cecil Mamiit | (United States) Bob Bryan (United States) Mike Bryan |
| 13.07. | France | Contrexéville Challenger | $ 50,000 | Clay | (Morocco) Younes El Aynaoui | (Argentina) Diego del Río (Argentina) Martín Rodríguez |
| 13.07. | Great Britain | Manchester Challenger | $ 50,000 | Grass | (United Kingdom) Chris Wilkinson | (Italy) Mosé Navarra (Italy) Stefano Pescosolido |
| 20.07. | Great Britain | Newcastle Challenger | $ 50,000 | Clay | (Argentina) Agustín Calleri | (South Africa) Jeff Coetzee (Netherlands) Edwin Kempes |
| 20.07. | Finland | Tampere Challenger | $ 50,000 | Clay | (Czech Republic) Tomáš Zíb | (Sweden) Tobias Hildebrand (Sweden) Fredrik Lovén |
| 27.07. | Turkey | Istanbul Challenger | $ 50,000 | Hard | (Czech Republic) Tomáš Zíb | (Czech Republic) Petr Luxa (Israel) Eyal Ran |
| 27.07. | Netherlands | Scheveningen Challenger | $ 50,000 | Clay | (Morocco) Younes El Aynaoui | (Argentina) Agustín Calleri (Sweden) Tobias Hildebrand |
| 27.07. | United States | Winnetka Challenger | $ 50,000 | Hard | (United States) Geoff Grant | (Australia) Grant Silcock (South Africa) Myles Wakefield |

=== August ===
| Date | Country | Tournament | Prizemoney | Surface | Singles champion | Doubles champions |
|---|---|---|---|---|---|---|
| 03.08. | Poland | Poznań Challenger | $ 125,000 | Clay | (Norway) Christian Ruud | (Argentina) Sebastián Prieto (Argentina) Martín Rodríguez |
| 03.08. | Spain | Open Castilla y León | $ 100,000 | Hard | (Czech Republic) Radek Štěpánek | (Czech Republic) Radek Štěpánek (Czech Republic) Tomáš Zíb |
| 03.08. | United States | Lexington Challenger | $ 50,000 | Hard | (United States) Paul Goldstein | (Australia) Ben Ellwood (Australia) Lleyton Hewitt |
| 03.08. | Brazil | Gramado Challenger | $ 25,000 | Hard | (Brazil) André Sá | (South Africa) Jeff Coetzee (South Africa) Damien Roberts |
| 03.08. | Mexico | Tijuana Challenger | $ 25,000 | Hard | (Australia) Michael Hill | (Australia) Michael Hill (United States) Scott Humphries |
| 10.08. | United States | Binghamton Challenger | $ 50,000 | Hard | (Japan) Takao Suzuki | (South Africa) Myles Wakefield (South Africa) Wesley Whitehouse |
| 10.08. | Brazil | Belo Horizonte Challenger | $ 25,000 | Hard | (Brazil) Francisco Costa | (Japan) Satoshi Iwabuchi (Japan) Thomas Shimada |
| 10.08. | Austria | Nettingsdorf Challenger | $ 25,000 | Clay | (Austria) Markus Hipfl | (Czech Republic) Tomáš Krupa (Slovenia) Borut Urh |
| 10.08. | Poland | Sopot Challenger | $ 25,000 | Clay | (Poland) Michał Chmela | (New Zealand) James Greenhalgh (Federal Republic of Yugoslavia) Nenad Zimonjić |
| 17.08. | Austria | Graz Challenger | $ 100,000 | Clay | (Spain) Carlos Costa | (Romania) Dinu Pescariu (Spain) Albert Portas |
| 17.08. | United States | Bronx Challenger | $ 50,000 | Hard | (United Kingdom) Miles Maclagan | (United States) Jared Palmer (Japan) Takao Suzuki |
| 17.08. | Poland | Warsaw Challenger | $ 50,000 | Clay | (Czech Republic) Jiří Vaněk | (New Zealand) James Greenhalgh (Federal Republic of Yugoslavia) Nenad Zimonjić |
| 24.08. | Switzerland | Geneva Challenger | $ 50,000 | Clay | (Spain) Juan Albert Viloca | (Sweden) Rikard Bergh (Germany) Jens Knippschild |
| 31.08. | Austria | Alpirsbach Challenger | $ 25,000 | Clay | (Austria) Stefan Koubek | (Czech Republic) Tomáš Cibulec (Czech Republic) Leoš Friedl |
| 31.08. | Serbia | Belgrade Challenger | $ 25,000 | Hard | (Czech Republic) Jiří Vaněk | (Netherlands) Raemon Sluiter (Federal Republic of Yugoslavia) Nenad Zimonjić |
| 31.08. | Bolivia | Santa Cruz Challenger | $ 25,000 | Clay | (Argentina) Gastón Gaudio | (Argentina) Marcelo Charpentier (Argentina) Andrés Schneiter |

=== September ===
| Date | Country | Tournament | Prizemoney | Surface | Singles champion | Doubles champions |
|---|---|---|---|---|---|---|
| 07.09. | Romania | Brașov Challenger | $ 50,000 | Clay | (Romania) Dinu Pescariu | (Spain) Juan Ignacio Carrasco (Spain) Jairo Velasco Jr. |
| 07.09. | Great Britain | Edinburgh Challenger | $ 50,000 | Clay | (Sweden) Tomas Nydahl | (Netherlands) Edwin Kempes (Netherlands) Peter Wessels |
| 07.09. | Ecuador | Quito Challenger | $ 50,000 | Clay | (Chile) Nicolás Massú | (Brazil) Adriano Ferreira (Mexico) Óscar Ortiz |
| 07.09. | Yugoslavia | Budva Challenger | $ 25,000 | Clay | (Germany) Tomas Behrend | (Spain) Eduardo Nicolás (Spain) Germán Puentes |
| 14.09. | Brazil | Florianópolis Challenger | $ 125,000 | Clay | (Argentina) Guillermo Cañas | (Brazil) Jaime Oncins (Brazil) André Sá |
| 14.09. | Hungary | Budapest Challenger II | $ 50,000 | Clay | (Italy) Renzo Furlan | (Hungary) Gábor Köves (Austria) Thomas Strengberger |
| 14.09. | North Macedonia | Skopje Challenger | $ 25,000 | Clay | (Spain) Jordi Mas | (Spain) Eduardo Nicolás (Spain) Germán Puentes |
| 21.09. | Poland | Szczecin Challenger | $ 125,000 | Clay | (Morocco) Younes El Aynaoui | (Bulgaria) Orlin Stanoytchev (Czech Republic) Radomír Vašek |
| 21.09. | United States | Urbana Challenger | $ 25,000 | Hard | (Canada) Daniel Nestor | (United States) Jared Palmer (United States) Jonathan Stark |
| 21.09. | Spain | Copa Sevilla | $ 25,000 | Clay | (Spain) Alberto Martín | (Spain) Alberto Martín (Spain) Salvador Navarro |
| 28.09. | Portugal | Oporto Challenger | $ 125,000 | Clay | (Morocco) Younes El Aynaoui | (Spain) Juan Ignacio Carrasco (Spain) Jairo Velasco Jr. |
| 28.09. | Venezuela | Caracas Challenger | $ 100,000 | Hard | (Brazil) Adriano Ferreira | (United States) Geoff Grant (Venezuela) Maurice Ruah |
| 28.09. | United States | Dallas Challenger | $ 50,000 | Hard | (Canada) Daniel Nestor | (United States) Jared Palmer (United States) Jonathan Stark |
| 28.09. | Italy | Olbia Challenger | $ 50,000 | Hard | (Italy) Daniele Bracciali | (Australia) Todd Larkham (United Kingdom) Chris Wilkinson |

=== October ===
| Date | Country | Tournament | Prizemoney | Surface | Singles champion | Doubles champions |
|---|---|---|---|---|---|---|
| 05.10. | Chile | Santiago Challenger | $ 100,000 | Clay | (Argentina) Sebastián Prieto | (Czech Republic) Ota Fukárek (Hungary) Attila Sávolt |
| 05.10. | United States | San Antonio Challenger | $ 50,000 | Hard | (United States) Geoff Grant | (United States) David DiLucia (United States) Michael Sell |
| 05.10. | Israel | Tel Aviv Challenger | $ 50,000 | Hard | (Italy) Gianluca Pozzi | (Czech Republic) Radek Štěpánek (Czech Republic) Michal Tabara |
| 12.10. | Spain | Barcelona Challenger | $ 100,000 | Clay | (Spain) Fernando Vicente | (Spain) José Antonio Conde (Spain) Javier Sánchez |
| 12.10. | Brazil | São Paulo Challenger | $ 100,000 | Clay | (Brazil) Fernando Meligeni | (Argentina) Diego del Río (Argentina) Martín Rodríguez |
| 12.10. | United States | San Diego Challenger | $ 50,000 | Hard | (Finland) Ville Liukko | (United States) Paul Goldstein (United States) Adam Peterson |
| 19.10. | Egypt | Cairo Challenger | $ 100,000 | Clay | (Spain) Albert Portas | (Spain) Albert Portas (Spain) Álex López Morón |
| 19.10. | Uruguay | Montevideo Challenger | $ 100,000 | Clay | (Argentina) Eduardo Medica | (Argentina) Francisco Cabello (Argentina) Agustín Calleri |
| 19.10. | Hong Kong | Hongkong Challenger | $ 50,000 | Hard | Not completed | |
| 19.10. | Germany | Okal Cup | $ 25,000 | Carpet (i) | (United States) Jared Palmer | (Czech Republic) Tomáš Cibulec (Netherlands) Raemon Sluiter |
| 19.10. | Uzbekistan | Samarkand Challenger | $ 25,000 | Clay | (Sweden) Fredrik Jonsson | (Israel) Noam Behr (Israel) Eyal Ran |
| 26.10. | France | Brest Challenger | $ 100,000 | Hard (i) | (France) Jérôme Golmard | (South Africa) Neville Godwin (South Africa) Marcos Ondruska |

=== November ===
| Date | Country | Tournament | Prizemoney | Surface | Singles champion | Doubles champions |
|---|---|---|---|---|---|---|
| 02.11. | Germany | Lambertz Open by STAWAG | $ 50,000 | Hard (i) | (Germany) Hendrik Dreekmann | (Netherlands) Menno Oosting (Czech Republic) Pavel Vízner |
| 09.11. | United States | Las Vegas Challenger | $ 50,000 | Hard | (United States) Cecil Mamiit | (South Africa) Marcos Ondruska (South Africa) Byron Talbot |
| 16.11. | Andorra | Andorra Challenger | $ 100,000 | Hard (i) | (United States) Justin Gimelstob | (United States) Justin Gimelstob (United States) Jack Waite |
| 16.11. | Argentina | Buenos Aires Challenger | $ 100,000 | Clay | (Morocco) Younes El Aynaoui | (Argentina) Guillermo Cañas (Argentina) Martín García |
| 16.11. | Mexico | Puebla Challenger | $ 25,000 | Hard | (Belarus) Vladimir Voltchkov | (Mexico) Alejandro González (Mexico) Mariano Sánchez |
| 16.11. | United States | Rancho Mirage Challenger | $ 25,000 | Hard | (Norway) Christian Ruud | (Australia) Wayne Arthurs (Australia) Peter Tramacchi |
| 23.11. | Peru | Lima Challenger | $ 100,000 | Clay | (Austria) Stefan Koubek | (Argentina) Diego del Río (Argentina) Martin Rodriguez |
| 23.11. | United States | Burbank Challenger | $ 25,000 | Hard | (United States) Cecil Mamiit | (United States) Mike Bryan (United States) Mike Bryan |
| 23.11. | Slovenia | Portorož Challenger | $ 25,000 | Hard (i) | (Germany) Rainer Schüttler | (Belarus) Max Mirnyi (Russia) Andrei Olhovskiy |
| 23.11. | Mexico | Toluca Challenger | $ 25,000 | Clay | (Netherlands) Rogier Wassen | (Mexico) Alejandro Hernández (Mexico) Mariano Sánchez |
| 30.11. | Mexico | Guadalajara Challenger | $ 100,000 | Clay | (Austria) Markus Hipfl | (Netherlands) Sander Groen (Lebanon) Ali Hamadeh |
| 30.11. | Germany | Nümbrecht Challenger | $ 50,000 | Carpet (i) | (Germany) Christian Vinck | (Belarus) Max Mirnyi (Russia) Andrei Olhovskiy |

=== December ===
| Date | Country | Tournament | Prizemoney | Surface | Singles champion | Doubles champions |
|---|---|---|---|---|---|---|
| 07.12. | Australia | Perth Challenger | $ 25,000 | Hard | (Australia) Lleyton Hewitt | (Australia) Lleyton Hewitt (Australia) Paul Kilderry |
| 07.12. | Chile | Cerveza Cristal | $ 25,000 | Clay | (Argentina) Gastón Gaudio | (Italy) Enzo Artoni (Argentina) Federico Browne |
| 21.12. | India | Ahmedabad Challenger | $ 25,000 | Hard | (France) Antony Dupuis | (Israel) Noam Okun (Israel) Nir Welgreen |
| 28.12. | India | Mumbai Challenger | $ 25,000 | Hard | (France) Antony Dupuis | (Israel) Noam Behr (Israel) Eyal Ran |
