= 1999 Davis Cup Americas Zone Group II =

International tennis competition

The Americas Zone was one of the three zones of the regional Davis Cup competition in 1999.

In the Americas Zone there were four different tiers, called groups, in which teams compete against each other to advance to the upper tier. Winners in Group II advanced to the Americas Zone Group I. Teams who lost their respective ties competed in the relegation play-offs, with winning teams remaining in Group II, whereas teams who lost their play-offs were relegated to the Americas Zone Group III in 2000.

== Participating nations ==
- Costa Rica
- Cuba
- Dominican Republic
- Haiti
- Mexico
- Paraguay
- Peru
- Uruguay

=== Draw ===
Relegation Play-offs
Port-au-Prince, Haiti (clay)
Paraguay	5
Haiti	0
San José, Costa Rica (hard)
Dominican Republic	2
Costa Rica	3

First Round
San Luis Potosí City, Mexico (hard)
Mexico	3
Paraguay	2
Havana, Cuba (indoor hard)
Cuba	4
Haiti	1
Santo Domingo, Dominican Rep. (hard)
Peru	4
Dominican Republic	1
San Rafael de Escazú, Costa Rica
Costa Rica	1
Uruguay	4

Second Round
Havana, Cuba (hard)
Mexico	3
Cuba	2
Lima, Peru (clay)
Peru	4
Uruguay	1

Third Round
Lima, Peru (clay)
Mexico	2
Peru	3

- Haiti and Dominican Republic relegated to Group III in 2000.
- Peru promoted to Group I in 2000.

== First round ==
=== Mexico vs. Paraguay ===
Mexico
3
Club Deportivo Potosino, San Luis Potosí City, Mexico
2–4 April 1999
Hard

Paraguay
2

			1	2	3	4	5
1	(Mexico) (Paraguay)	Alejandro Hernández; Paulo Carvallo	6; 4	6; 4	6; 0
2	(Mexico) (Paraguay)	Marco Osorio; Ramón Delgado	2; 6	7; 5	7^{7} 6^{5}	6; 2
3	(Mexico) (Paraguay)	Leonardo Lavalle / David Roditi; Paulo Carvallo / Ramón Delgado	6; 4	6^{4} 7^{7}	5; 7	4; 6
4	(Mexico) (Paraguay)	Alejandro Hernández; Ramón Delgado	6^{2} 7^{7}	4; 6	6; 3	6; 4	6; 1
5	(Mexico) (Paraguay)	Marco Osorio; Paulo Carvallo	6; 2	3; 6	3; 6

=== Cuba vs. Haiti ===
Cuba
4
Habana-Meliá Club, Havana, Cuba
2–4 April 1999
Hard (indoors)

Haiti
1

			1	2	3	4	5
1	(Cuba) (Haiti)	Lázaro Navarro-Batles; Jerry Joseph	7; 5	7; 5	6; 4
2	(Cuba) (Haiti)	Sandor Martínez Breijo; David Cardoza	4; 6	6; 4	6; 3	7^{8} 6^{6}
3	(Cuba) (Haiti)	Lázaro Navarro-Batles / Juan Pino; David Cardoza / Jerry Joseph	7^{7} 6^{4}	6; 3	7; 5
4	(Cuba) (Haiti)	Jorge Catala; Jean Max Mangones	6; 2	6; 3
5	(Cuba) (Haiti)	Sandor Martínez Breijo; Jerry Joseph	4; 6	6; 4	5; 7

=== Dominican Republic vs. Peru ===
Dominican Republic
1
Santo Domingo Hotel, Santo Domingo, Dominican Republic
2–4 April 1999
Hard

Peru
4

			1	2	3	4	5
1	(Dominican Republic) (Peru)	Genaro Deleon; Luis Horna	2; 6	6; 3	3; 6	3; 6
2	(Dominican Republic) (Peru)	Rodrigo Vallejo; Américo Venero	5; 7	6; 2	6^{3} 7^{7}	2; 6
3	(Dominican Republic) (Peru)	Sixto Camacho / Rodrigo Vallejo; Luis Horna / Américo Venero	3; 6	7^{7} 6^{5}	4; 6	3; 6
4	(Dominican Republic) (Peru)	Jhonson García; Alejandro Aramburú	3; 6	6; 4	5; 7
5	(Dominican Republic) (Peru)	Genaro Deleon; Iván Miranda	6; 2	6; 0

=== Costa Rica vs. Uruguay ===
Costa Rica
1
Costa Rica Country Club, San Rafael de Escazú, Costa Rica
2–4 April 1999
Hard

Uruguay
4

			1	2	3	4	5
1	(Costa Rica) (Uruguay)	Rafael Ávalos Brenes; Federico Dondo	6^{9} 7^{11}	7^{7} 6^{4}	4; 6	0; 6
2	(Costa Rica) (Uruguay)	Juan Antonio Marín; Alejandro Olivera	6; 3	2; 6	4; 6	6; 2	7; 5
3	(Costa Rica) (Uruguay)	Juan Antonio Marín / Kenneth Thome Bolanos; Federico Dondo / Gonzalo Rodríguez	7^{10} 6^{8}	3; 6	6^{8} 7^{10}	4; 6
4	(Costa Rica) (Uruguay)	Juan Antonio Marín; Federico Dondo	6^{2} 7^{7}	7^{7} 6^{2}	3; 6	6^{14} 7^{16}
5	(Costa Rica) (Uruguay)	Rafael Ávalos Brenes; Alejandro Olivera	4; 6	4; 6

== Second round ==
=== Cuba vs. Mexico ===
Cuba
2
Habana-Meliá Club, Havana, Cuba
16–18 July 1999
Hard

Mexico
3

			1	2	3	4	5
1	(Cuba) (Mexico)	Lázaro Navarro-Batles; Marco Osorio	7^{7} 6^{4}	4; 6	7^{7} 6^{1}	3; 6	7; 5
2	(Cuba) (Mexico)	Jorge Catala; Alejandro Hernández	3; 6	2; 6	3; 6
3	(Cuba) (Mexico)	Lázaro Navarro-Batles / Juan Pino; Óscar Ortiz / David Roditi	3; 6	6^{4} 7^{7}	2; 6
4	(Cuba) (Mexico)	Lázaro Navarro-Batles; Alejandro Hernández	6^{5} 7^{7}	7^{7} 6^{4}	6; 2	6; 3
5	(Cuba) (Mexico)	Sandor Martínez Breijo; Marco Osorio	2; 6	1; 6	6; 4	4; 6

=== Peru vs. Uruguay ===
Peru
4
Club Terrazas, Lima, Peru
16–18 July 1999
Clay

Uruguay
1

			1	2	3	4	5
1	(Peru) (Uruguay)	Alejandro Aramburú; Federico Dondo	2; 6	3; 6	2; 6
2	(Peru) (Uruguay)	Luis Horna; Alejandro Olivera	6; 3	5; 7	6; 0	6; 2
3	(Peru) (Uruguay)	Luis Horna / Américo Venero; Federico Dondo / Gonzalo Rodríguez	6; 3	6; 4	6; 2
4	(Peru) (Uruguay)	Luis Horna; Federico Dondo	6; 3	6; 3	4; 6	6^{6} 7^{8}	6; 0
5	(Peru) (Uruguay)	Iván Miranda; Alejandro Olivera	6; 3	7; 5

== Relegation play-offs ==
=== Haiti vs. Paraguay ===
Haiti
0
Cercle Bellevue, Port-au-Prince, Haiti
16–18 July 1999
Clay

Paraguay
5

			1	2	3	4	5
1	(Haiti) (Paraguay)	Jean Max Mangones; Paulo Carvallo	0; 6	0; 6	3; 6
2	(Haiti) (Paraguay)	Bertrand Madsen; Francisco Rodríguez	6^{1} 7^{7}	6^{5} 7^{7}	6; 4	6; 4	6; 8
3	(Haiti) (Paraguay)	Bertrand Lacombe / Bertrand Madsen; Paulo Carvallo / Francisco Rodríguez	2; 6	6^{6} 7^{8}	6; 4	4; 6
4	(Haiti) (Paraguay)	Bertrand Madsen; Paulo Carvallo	3; 6	4; 6
5	(Haiti) (Paraguay)	Philippe Lacombe; Francisco Rodríguez	1; 6	2; 6

=== Costa Rica vs. Dominican Republic ===
Costa Rica
3
Costa Rica Country Club, San Rafael de Escazú, Costa Rica
16–18 July 1999
Hard

Dominican Republic
2

			1	2	3	4	5
1	(Costa Rica) (Dominican Republic)	Rafael Ávalos Brenes; Rodrigo Vallejo	6^{4} 7^{7}	1; 6	6; 3	6; 4	6; 2
2	(Costa Rica) (Dominican Republic)	Juan Antonio Marín; Genaro Deleon	6^{3} 7^{7}	6; 3	6; 3	6; 2
3	(Costa Rica) (Dominican Republic)	Juan Antonio Marín / Kenneth Thome Bolanos; Sixto Camacho / Jhonson García	6; 2	6; 2	7^{8} 6^{6}
4	(Costa Rica) (Dominican Republic)	Juan Antonio Marín; Jhonson García	4; 6	6; 4	6^{8} 7^{10}
5	(Costa Rica) (Dominican Republic)	Federico Camacho; Genaro Deleon	2; 6	1; 6

== Third round ==
=== Peru vs. Mexico ===
Peru
3
Club Terrazas, Lima, Peru
24–26 September 1999
Clay

Mexico
2

			1	2	3	4	5
1	(Peru) (Mexico)	Luis Horna; Luis Herrera	6; 4	6; 3	6; 4
2	(Peru) (Mexico)	Américo Venero; Alejandro Hernández	5; 7	7^{7} 6^{3}	2; 6	6; 2	4; 6
3	(Peru) (Mexico)	Luis Horna / Américo Venero; Óscar Ortiz / David Roditi	5; 7	6; 4	3; 6	4; 6
4	(Peru) (Mexico)	Luis Horna; Alejandro Hernández	6; 1	6; 1	6; 4
5	(Peru) (Mexico)	Américo Venero; Luis Herrera	6; 3	6; 4	1; 6	6; 3
