= 1996 Cerveza Club Colombia Open – Doubles =

Doubles
- 1996 Cerveza Club Colombia Open
- 1995 Champions: (Czech Republic) Jiří Novák (Czech Republic) David Rikl

Final
- Champions: (Venezuela) Nicolás Pereira (Czech Republic) David Rikl
- Runners-up: (Ecuador) Pablo Campana (Ecuador) Nicolás Lapentti
- Score: 6–3, 7–6

Details
- Draw: 16
- Seeds: 4

Events
Singles	Doubles
- Cerveza Club Colombia Open

Jiří Novák and David Rikl were the defending champions but only Rikl competed that year with Nicolás Pereira.

Pereira and Rikl won in the final 6–3, 7–6 against Pablo Campana and Nicolás Lapentti.

== Seeds ==
Champion seeds are indicated in bold text while text in italics indicates the round in which those seeds were eliminated.

1. (Spain) José Antonio Conde / (Spain) Javier Sánchez (first round)
2. (Venezuela) **Nicolás Pereira** / (Czech Republic) **David Rikl (champions)**
3. (Argentina) Pablo Albano / (Argentina) Lucas Arnold (quarterfinals)
4. (South Africa) Brent Haygarth / (United States) Greg Van Emburgh (first round)

== Draw ==
Key

- Q = Qualifier
- WC = Wild card
- LL = Lucky loser
- Alt = Alternate
- ITF = ITF entry
- PR = Protected ranking
- SR = Special ranking
- SE = Special exempt
- JE = Junior exempt
- JR = Junior Accelerator Programme entrant
- CO = College Accelerator Programme entrant
- NG = Next Gen Accelerator Program entrant
- w/o = Walkover
- r = Retired
- d = Defaulted

First round
1	(Spain) J A Conde (Spain) J Sánchez	3	4
Q	(Argentina) **G Cañas** (Paraguay) **R Delgado**	**6**	**6**
(Argentina) **D del Río** (Brazil) **C Testa**	**6**	**7**
WC	(Colombia) C Drada (Colombia) P Moggio	4	5
4	(South Africa) B Haygarth (United States) G Van Emburgh	**6**	4	4
(France) **J Golmard** (France) **F Santoro**	4	**6**	**6**
(Ecuador) **P Campana** (Ecuador) **N Lapentti**	**6**	**6**
(Argentina) G Etlis (Israel) E Ran	4	3
(United States) B Shelton (The Bahamas) R Smith	6	4
(Zimbabwe) **W Black** (United States) **T. J. Middleton**	**7**	**6**
WC	(Colombia) M Rincón (Colombia) M Tobón	2	4
3	(Argentina) **P Albano** (Argentina) **L Arnold**	**6**	**6**
(Peru) A Aramburú (Senegal) Y Doumbia	4	**6**	3
WC	(Uruguay) **F Dondo** (Uruguay) **M Filippini**	**6**	3	**6**
(Canada) S Leblanc (South Africa) D Nainkin	2	5
2	(Venezuela) **N Pereira** (Czech Republic) **D Rikl**	**6**	**7**

Quarterfinals
Q	(Argentina) G Cañas (Paraguay) R Delgado	5	0
(Argentina) **D del Río** (Brazil) **C Testa**	**7**	**6**
(France) J Golmard (France) F Santoro	3	6
(Ecuador) **P Campana** (Ecuador) **N Lapentti**	**6**	**7**
(Zimbabwe) **W Black** (United States) **T. J. Middleton**	**6**	**7**
3	(Argentina) P Albano (Argentina) L Arnold	1	6
WC	(Uruguay) F Dondo (Uruguay) M Filippini	3	3
2	(Venezuela) **N Pereira** (Czech Republic) **D Rikl**	**6**	**6**

Semifinals
(Argentina) D del Río (Brazil) C Testa	6	4
(Ecuador) **P Campana** (Ecuador) **N Lapentti**	**7**	**6**
(Zimbabwe) W Black (United States) T. J. Middleton	3	**7**	0
2	(Venezuela) **N Pereira** (Czech Republic) **D Rikl**	**6**	6	**6**

Final
(Ecuador) Pablo Campana (Ecuador) Nicolás Lapentti	3	6
2	(Venezuela) **Nicolás Pereira** (Czech Republic) **David Rikl**	**6**	**7**
