= Tennis at the 1999 Pan American Games =

The tennis competition at the 1999 Pan American Games was held from July 29 to August 5, 1999, at the Winnipeg Lawn Tennis Club in Winnipeg, Manitoba, Canada. Men's and women's singles and doubles events were held.

== Medal summary ==
Event	Gold	Silver	Bronze
Men's singles	(United States) Paul Goldstein	(United States) Cecil Mamiit	(Argentina) David Nalbandian
Men's singles	(United States) Paul Goldstein	(United States) Cecil Mamiit	(Brazil) Paulo Taicher
Women's singles	(Venezuela) María Alejandra Vento-Kabchi	(United States) Tara Snyder	(Argentina) Mariana Díaz Oliva
Women's singles	(Venezuela) María Alejandra Vento-Kabchi	(United States) Tara Snyder	(United States) Alexandra Stevenson
Men's doubles	(Brazil) André Sá and Paulo Taicher	(Mexico) Óscar Ortiz and Marco Osorio	(United States) Bob Bryan and Mike Bryan
Men's doubles	(Brazil) André Sá and Paulo Taicher	(Mexico) Óscar Ortiz and Marco Osorio	(Venezuela) Yohny Romero and Maurice Ruah
Women's doubles	(Brazil) Joana Cortez and Vanessa Menga	(Chile) Paula Cabezas and Bárbara Castro	(Argentina) Mariana Díaz Oliva and Clarisa Fernández
Women's doubles	(Brazil) Joana Cortez and Vanessa Menga	(Chile) Paula Cabezas and Bárbara Castro	(Canada) Renata Kolbovic and Aneta Soukup

== Medal table ==
Rank	Nation	Gold	Silver	Bronze	Total
1	Brazil (BRA)	2	0	1	3
2	United States (USA)	1	2	2	5
3	Venezuela (VEN)	1	0	1	2
4	Chile (CHI)	0	1	0	1
4	Mexico (MEX)	0	1	0	1
6	Argentina (ARG)	0	0	3	3
7	Canada (CAN)	0	0	1	1
Totals (7 entries)		4	4	8	16

== See also ==
- Tennis at the Pan American Games
