= 1996 Cerveza Club Colombia Open – Singles =

Singles
- 1996 Cerveza Club Colombia Open
- 1995 Champion: (Ecuador) Nicolás Lapentti

Final
- Champion: (Austria) Thomas Muster
- Runner-up: (Ecuador) Nicolás Lapentti
- Score: 6–7^{(6–8)}, 6–2, 6–3

Details
- Draw: 32
- Seeds: 8

Events
Singles	Doubles
- Cerveza Club Colombia Open

Nicolás Lapentti was the defending champion but lost in the final 6–7^{(6–8)}, 6–2, 6–3 against Thomas Muster.

== Seeds ==
A champion seed is indicated in bold text while text in italics indicates the round in which that seed was eliminated.

1. (Austria) **Thomas Muster (champion)**
2. (Netherlands) Sjeng Schalken (quarterfinals)
3. (Spain) Javier Sánchez (second round)
4. (Ecuador) Nicolás Lapentti (final)
5. (Venezuela) Nicolás Pereira (second round)
6. (Uruguay) Marcelo Filippini (first round)
7. (Colombia) Mauricio Hadad (semifinals)
8. (France) Fabrice Santoro (second round)

== Draw ==
Key

- Q = Qualifier
- WC = Wild card
- LL = Lucky loser
- Alt = Alternate
- ITF = ITF entry
- PR = Protected ranking
- SR = Special ranking
- SE = Special exempt
- JE = Junior exempt
- JR = Junior Accelerator Programme entrant
- CO = College Accelerator Programme entrant
- NG = Next Gen Accelerator Program entrant
- w/o = Walkover
- r = Retired
- d = Defaulted

First round
WC/1	(Austria) **T Muster**	**6**	**6**
(Argentina) F Squillari	4	3
(Ecuador) L Morejón	4	4
(United States) **B Shelton**	**6**	**6**
(Senegal) Y Doumbia	3	4
Q	(Paraguay) **R Delgado**	**6**	**6**
(Ecuador) P Campana	**7**	4	4
8	(France) **F Santoro**	5	**6**	**6**
3	(Spain) **J Sánchez**	**6**	**6**
(Colombia) M Rincón	4	3
(Colombia) M Tobón	4	6^{2}
(Argentina) **L Arnold**	**6**	**7^{7}**
(Israel) **E Ran**	**6**	**6**
(Armenia) S Sargsian	4	4
(France) J Golmard	4	4
5	(Venezuela) **N Pereira**	**6**	**6**
6	(Uruguay) M Filippini	3	**6**	6^{3}
Q	(Uruguay) **F Dondo**	**6**	1	**7^{7}**
Q	(Argentina) G Cañas	1	2
(Mexico) **A Hernández**	**6**	**6**
(Zimbabwe) **W Black**	**6**	**7**
LL	(United States) W McGuire	4	5
(Czech Republic) D Rikl	4	**6**	4
4	(Ecuador) **N Lapentti**	**6**	4	**6**
7	(Colombia) **M Hadad**	**6**	**6**
(South Africa) D Nainkin	4	2
(Italy) **D Musa**	**6**	**6**
WC	(Colombia) P Moggio	2	1
(Argentina) **G Etlis**	**7**	0	**6**
WC	(Colombia) C Drada	5	**6**	4
Q	(Argentina) P Albano	3	**7**	5
2	(Netherlands) **S Schalken**	**6**	5	**7**

Second round
WC/1	(Austria) **T Muster**	**6**	**6**
(United States) B Shelton	4	4
Q	(Paraguay) **R Delgado**	**7^{7}**	**6**
8	(France) F Santoro	6^{2}	2
3	(Spain) J Sánchez	5	**6**	3
(Argentina) **L Arnold**	**7**	4	**6**
(Israel) **E Ran**	**6**	4	**6**
5	(Venezuela) N Pereira	2	**6**	2
Q	(Uruguay) F Dondo	5	4
(Mexico) **A Hernández**	**7**	**6**
(Zimbabwe) W Black	2	2
4	(Ecuador) **N Lapentti**	**6**	**6**
7	(Colombia) **M Hadad**	6^{4}	**7^{9}**	**6**
(Italy) D Musa	**7^{7}**	6^{7}	4
(Argentina) G Etlis	1	**6**	4
2	(Netherlands) **S Schalken**	**6**	3	**6**

Quarterfinals
WC/1	(Austria) **T Muster**	2	**6**	**7**
Q	(Paraguay) R Delgado	**6**	1	5
(Argentina) **L Arnold**	2	**6**	**6**
(Israel) E Ran	**6**	3	3
(Mexico) A Hernández	6^{5}	4
4	(Ecuador) **N Lapentti**	**7^{7}**	**6**
7	(Colombia) **M Hadad**	**6**	**7^{8}**
2	(Netherlands) S Schalken	2	6^{6}

Semifinals
WC/1	(Austria) **T Muster**	**6**	6^{7}	**6**
(Argentina) L Arnold	1	**7^{9}**	3
4	(Ecuador) **N Lapentti**	4	**6**	**7**
7	(Colombia) M Hadad	**6**	3	5

Final
WC/1	(Austria) **Thomas Muster**	6^{6}	**6**	**6**
4	(Ecuador) Nicolás Lapentti	**7^{8}**	2	3
