= 2006 Davis Cup Americas Zone Group III =

International tennis competition

The Group III tournament was held on June 14–18, in Maya Country Club, Santa Tecla, El Salvador on outdoor clay courts.

== Format ==
The eight teams were split into two groups and played in a round-robin format. The top two teams of each group advanced to the promotion pool, from which the two top teams were promoted to the Americas Zone Group II in 2007. The last two placed teams of each group from the preliminary round were relegated into the relegation pool, from which the two bottom teams were relegated to the Americas Zone Group IV in 2007.

== Pool A ==
	Group A	BAH	PUR	TRI	HON
1	Bahamas (2–1)		3–0	2–1	1–2
2	Puerto Rico (2–1)	0–3		3–0	3–0
3	Trinidad and Tobago (1–2)	1–2	0–3		3–0
4	Honduras (1–2)	2–1	0–3	0–3	

=== Trinidad and Tobago vs. Honduras ===
Trinidad and Tobago
3
Maya Country Club, Santa Tecla, El Salvador
14 June 2006
Clay

Honduras
0

			1	2	3
1	(Trinidad and Tobago) (Honduras)	Shane Stone; José Moncada	6^{4} 7^{7}	7^{7} 6^{2}	6; 3
2	(Trinidad and Tobago) (Honduras)	Richard Brown; Calton Álvarez	6; 3	6; 2
3	(Trinidad and Tobago) (Honduras)	Shane Stone / Troy Stone; Carlos Cáceres / Francklin García	6; 3	6; 0

=== Bahamas vs. Puerto Rico ===
Bahamas
3
Maya Country Club, Santa Tecla, El Salvador
14 June 2006
Clay

Puerto Rico
0

			1	2	3
1	(The Bahamas) (Puerto Rico)	Marvin Rolle; Ricardo González-Díaz	6; 3	5; 7	6; 3
2	(The Bahamas) (Puerto Rico)	Devin Mullings; Gilberto Álvarez	6; 3	6^{3} 7^{7}	6; 4
3	(The Bahamas) (Puerto Rico)	Devin Mullings / Marvin Rolle; Gabriel Montilla / Jorge Rangel	6; 4	6; 4

=== Trinidad and Tobago vs. Bahamas ===
Trinidad and Tobago
1
Maya Country Club, Santa Tecla, El Salvador
15 June 2006
Clay

Bahamas
2

			1	2	3
1	(Trinidad and Tobago) (The Bahamas)	Shane Stone; Marvin Rolle	3; 6	6; 3	3; 6
2	(Trinidad and Tobago) (The Bahamas)	Richard Brown; Devin Mullings	1; 6	4; 6
3	(Trinidad and Tobago) (The Bahamas)	Shane Stone / Troy Stone; Devin Mullings / Marvin Rolle	3; 6	6; 3	6; 4

=== Puerto Rico vs. Honduras ===
Puerto Rico
3
Maya Country Club, Santa Tecla, El Salvador
15 June 2006
Clay

Honduras
0

			1	2	3
1	(Puerto Rico) (Honduras)	Gilberto Álvarez; José Moncada	6; 1	4; 6	6; 2
2	(Puerto Rico) (Honduras)	Jorge Rangel; Calton Álvarez	6; 0	6; 2
3	(Puerto Rico) (Honduras)	Ricardo González-Díaz / Gabriel Montilla; Francklin García / José Moncada	7; 5	6; 2

=== Trinidad and Tobago vs. Puerto Rico ===
Trinidad and Tobago
0
Maya Country Club, Santa Tecla, El Salvador
16 June 2006
Clay

Puerto Rico
3

			1	2	3
1	(Trinidad and Tobago) (Puerto Rico)	Shane Stone; Ricardo González-Díaz	1; 6	2; 6
2	(Trinidad and Tobago) (Puerto Rico)	Richard Brown; Jorge Rangel	2; 6	7^{7} 6^{2}	4; 6
3	(Trinidad and Tobago) (Puerto Rico)	Michael Clarke / Troy Stone; Ricardo González-Díaz / Gabriel Montilla	3; 6	2; 6

=== Bahamas vs. Honduras ===
Bahamas
1
Maya Country Club, Santa Tecla, El Salvador
16 June 2006
Clay

Honduras
2

			1	2	3
1	(The Bahamas) (Honduras)	Christopher Eldon; José Moncada	4; 6	6; 2	2; 6
2	(The Bahamas) (Honduras)	H'Cone Thompson; Calton Álvarez	4; 6	6; 1	5; 7
3	(The Bahamas) (Honduras)	Christopher Eldon / H'Cone Thompson; Carlos Cáceres / José Moncada	6; 4	6^{7} 7^{9}	6; 3

== Pool B ==
	Group B	ESA	CUB	HAI	CRC
1	El Salvador (2–1)		2–1	3–0	1–2
2	Cuba (2–1)	1–2		3–0	2–1
3	Haiti (1–2)	0–3	0–3		2–1
4	Costa Rica (1–2)	2–1	1–2	1–2	

=== Cuba vs. El Salvador ===
Cuba
1
Maya Country Club, Santa Tecla, El Salvador
14 June 2006
Clay

El Salvador
2

			1	2	3
1	(Cuba) (El Salvador)	Edgar Hernandez-Perez; Jaime Cuellar	7; 5	6; 1
2	(Cuba) (El Salvador)	Ricardo Chile; Rafael Arévalo	4; 6	6; 4	1; 6
3	(Cuba) (El Salvador)	Ricardo Chile / Sandor Martínez; Rafael Arévalo / Jaime Cuellar	7^{7} 6^{3}	4; 6	4; 6

=== Haiti vs. Costa Rica ===
Haiti
2
Maya Country Club, Santa Tecla, El Salvador
14 June 2006
Clay

Costa Rica
1

			1	2	3
1	(Haiti) (Costa Rica)	Gael Gaetjens; Fernando Martínez Manrique	7^{7} 6^{4}	3; 6	6; 4
2	(Haiti) (Costa Rica)	Joel Allen; Juan Antonio Marín	1; 6	0; 6
3	(Haiti) (Costa Rica)	Joel Allen / Jean Marc Bazanne; Federico Camacho / Juan Antonio Marín	6; 2	7; 5

=== Cuba vs. Costa Rica ===
Cuba
2
Maya Country Club, Santa Tecla, El Salvador
15 June 2006
Clay

Costa Rica
1

			1	2	3
1	(Cuba) (Costa Rica)	Edgar Hernandez-Perez; Federico Camacho	6; 1	6; 3
2	(Cuba) (Costa Rica)	Ricardo Chile; Juan Antonio Marín	3; 6	1; 6
3	(Cuba) (Costa Rica)	Ricardo Chile / Sandor Martínez; Juan Antonio Marín / Fernando Martínez Manrique	6; 4	6; 1

=== El Salvador vs. Haiti ===
El Salvador
3
Maya Country Club, Santa Tecla, El Salvador
15 June 2006
Clay

Haiti
0

			1	2	3
1	(El Salvador) (Haiti)	Jaime Cuellar; Jean Marc Bazanne	6; 1	6; 4
2	(El Salvador) (Haiti)	Rafael Arévalo; Gael Gaetjens	6; 1	6; 4
3	(El Salvador) (Haiti)	Rafael Arévalo / Jaime Cuellar; Joel Allen / Gael Gaetjens	6; 3	6; 2

=== Cuba vs. Haiti ===
Cuba
3
Maya Country Club, Santa Tecla, El Salvador
16 June 2006
Clay

Haiti
0

			1	2	3
1	(Cuba) (Haiti)	Edgar Hernandez-Perez; Jean Marc Bazanne	6; 1	6; 3
2	(Cuba) (Haiti)	Ricardo Chile; Gael Gaetjens	6; 3	6; 0
3	(Cuba) (Haiti)	Edgar Hernandez-Perez / Sandor Martínez; Joel Allen / Gael Gaetjens	6; 4	6; 4

=== El Salvador vs. Costa Rica ===
El Salvador
1
Maya Country Club, Santa Tecla, El Salvador
16 June 2006
Clay

Costa Rica
2

			1	2	3
1	(El Salvador) (Costa Rica)	Andrés Weisskopf; Geoffrey Barton	3; 6	4; 6
2	(El Salvador) (Costa Rica)	José Baires; Federico Camacho	6; 4	3; 6	7; 9
3	(El Salvador) (Costa Rica)	Rafael Arévalo / Jaime Cuellar; Juan Antonio Marín / Fernando Martínez Manrique	7^{8} 6^{6}	6; 4

== Promotion pool ==
The top two teams from each of Pools A and B advanced to the Promotion pool. Results and points from games against the opponent from the preliminary round were carried forward.

(scores in italics carried over from Groups)

	1st–4th Play-off	ESA	CUB	BAH	PUR
1	El Salvador (3–0)		2–1	3–0	2–1
2	Cuba (2–1)	1–2		3–0	2–1
3	Bahamas (1–2)	0–3	0–3		3–0
4	Puerto Rico (0–3)	1–2	1–2	0–3	

- El Salvador and Cuba promoted to Group II in 2007.

=== Bahamas vs. El Salvador ===
Bahamas
0
Maya Country Club, Santa Tecla, El Salvador
17 June 2006
Clay

El Salvador
3

			1	2	3
1	(The Bahamas) (El Salvador)	Marvin Rolle; Jaime Cuellar	1; 6	4; 6
2	(The Bahamas) (El Salvador)	Devin Mullings; Rafael Arévalo	1; 6	4; 6
3	(The Bahamas) (El Salvador)	Devin Mullings / Marvin Rolle; Rafael Arévalo / Jaime Cuellar	5; 7	6; 2	1; 6

=== Puerto Rico vs. Cuba ===
Puerto Rico
1
Maya Country Club, Santa Tecla, El Salvador
17 June 2006
Clay

Cuba
2

			1	2	3
1	(Puerto Rico) (Cuba)	Gilberto Álvarez; Edgar Hernandez-Perez	7; 5	6; 1
2	(Puerto Rico) (Cuba)	Jorge Rangel; Ricardo Chile	2; 6	4; 6
3	(Puerto Rico) (Cuba)	Gilberto Álvarez / Gabriel Montilla; Ricardo Chile / Sandor Martínez	2; 6	4; 6

=== Bahamas vs. Cuba ===
Bahamas
0
Maya Country Club, Santa Tecla, El Salvador
18 June 2006
Clay

Cuba
3

			1	2	3
1	(The Bahamas) (Cuba)	Marvin Rolle; Edgar Hernandez-Perez	5; 7	6; 3	3; 6
2	(The Bahamas) (Cuba)	Devin Mullings; Ricardo Chile	2; 6	2; 6
3	(The Bahamas) (Cuba)	Devin Mullings / Marvin Rolle; Favel-Antonio Freyre-Perdomo / Sandor Martínez	1; 6	5; 7

=== El Salvador vs. Puerto Rico ===
El Salvador
2
Maya Country Club, Santa Tecla, El Salvador
18 June 2006
Clay

Puerto Rico
1

			1	2	3
1	(El Salvador) (Puerto Rico)	José Baires; Ricardo González-Díaz	3; 6	5; 7
2	(El Salvador) (Puerto Rico)	Rafael Arévalo; Jorge Rangel	6; 1	6; 2
3	(El Salvador) (Puerto Rico)	Rafael Arévalo / Jaime Cuellar; Gilberto Álvarez / Ricardo González-Díaz	6; 4	3; 6	8; 6

== Relegation pool ==
The bottom two teams from Pools A and B were placed in the relegation group. Results and points from games against the opponent from the preliminary round were carried forward.

(scores in italics carried over from Groups)

	5th–8th Play-off	HAI	CRC	TRI	HON
1	Haiti (2–1)		2–1	2–1	0–3
2	Costa Rica (2–1)	1–2		2–1	2–1
3	Trinidad and Tobago (1–2)	1–2	1–2		3–0
4	Honduras (1–2)	3–0	1–2	0–3	

- Trinidad & Tobago and Honduras relegated to Group IV in 2007.

=== Trinidad and Tobago vs. Haiti ===
Trinidad and Tobago
1
Maya Country Club, Santa Tecla, El Salvador
17 June 2006
Clay

Haiti
2

			1	2	3
1	(Trinidad and Tobago) (Haiti)	Michael Clarke; Gael Gaetjens	4; 6	1; 6
2	(Trinidad and Tobago) (Haiti)	Shane Stone; Joel Allen	6; 4	7; 5
3	(Trinidad and Tobago) (Haiti)	Shane Stone / Troy Stone; Joel Allen / Jean Marc Bazanne	2; 6	3; 6

=== Costa Rica vs. Honduras ===
Costa Rica
2
Maya Country Club, Santa Tecla, El Salvador
17 June 2006
Clay

Honduras
1

			1	2	3
1	(Costa Rica) (Honduras)	Fernando Martínez Manrique; José Moncada	3; 6	6; 3	3; 6
2	(Costa Rica) (Honduras)	Juan Antonio Marín; Calton Álvarez	6; 1	6; 1
3	(Costa Rica) (Honduras)	Federico Camacho / Juan Antonio Marín; Carlos Cáceres / José Moncada	6; 2	6; 4

=== Trinidad and Tobago vs. Costa Rica ===
Trinidad and Tobago
1
Maya Country Club, Santa Tecla, El Salvador
18 June 2006
Clay

Costa Rica
2

			1	2	3
1	(Trinidad and Tobago) (Costa Rica)	Shane Stone; Federico Camacho	6^{1} 7^{7}	0; 6
2	(Trinidad and Tobago) (Costa Rica)	Richard Brown; Juan Antonio Marín	2; 6	2; 6
3	(Trinidad and Tobago) (Costa Rica)	Shane Stone / Troy Stone; Geoffrey Barton / Fernando Martínez Manrique	6; 4	6; 4

=== Haiti vs. Honduras ===
Haiti
0
Maya Country Club, Santa Tecla, El Salvador
18 June 2006
Clay

Honduras
3

			1	2	3
1	(Haiti) (Honduras)	Nicolas Étienne; José Moncada	1; 6	0; 6
2	(Haiti) (Honduras)	Jean Marc Bazanne; Calton Álvarez	1; 6	2; 6
3	(Haiti) (Honduras)	Jean Marc Bazanne / Nicolas Étienne; Calton Álvarez / Francklin García	1; 6	4; 6

== Final standings ==
Rank	Team
1	El Salvador
2	Cuba
3	Bahamas
4	Puerto Rico
5	Haiti
6	Costa Rica
7	Trinidad and Tobago
8	Honduras

- El Salvador and Cuba promoted to Group II in 2007.
- Trinidad and Tobago and Honduras relegated to Group IV in 2007.
