= Andrés Zingman =

Argentine tennis player

- Full name: Andrés Zingman
- Country (sports): Argentina
- Born: 16 June 1974 (age 52) Buenos Aires, Argentina
- Prize money: $99,269

Singles
- Career record: 1–3
- Career titles: 0
- Highest ranking: No. 214 (8 March 1999)

Doubles
- Career record: 0–2
- Career titles: 0
- Highest ranking: No. 232 (13 December 1999)

Andrés Zingman (born 16 June 1974) is a former professional tennis player from Argentina.

== Biography ==
Zingman, known as "Andy", comes from Buenos Aires and began competing professionally in 1993.

He made his earliest ATP Tour main draw appearances in 1996, the first at the Swiss Open Gstaad where he lost to Karim Alami in the opening round, then at the Romanian Open in Bucharest, competing in both the singles and doubles. In Bucharest he faced another Moroccan Hicham Arazi in the first round, but this time came out on top, before losing in the second round to Carlos Moyá. As a doubles player he played at Gstaad again in 1997, partnering Dominik Hrbatý.

A regular on the Challenger circuit, he had a win over Franco Squillari, then 47 in the world, at the 1998 Sao Paulo tournament. His only Challenger title came in doubles, in Quito in the 1999 season.

He played as a qualifier in the main draw of the 1999 Gold Flake Open, an ATP Tour tournament held in Chennai.

In 1999 he featured in the qualifying events of all four Grand Slam tournaments.

In Israel, Zingman was a head coach at the David Squad, a non-profit school recognised as the top independent tennis academy in the country.

As of most recently, Zingman is a coach in Atlanta, Georgia. He currently coaches at the Universal Tennis Academy.

== Challenger titles ==
=== Doubles: (1) ===
No.	Year	Tournament	Surface	Partner	Opponents	Score
1.	1999	Quito, Ecuador	Clay	(Brazil) Paulo Taicher	(Mexico) Óscar Ortiz (Mexico) Marco Osorio	7–5, 4–6, 7–5
