= Tennis at the 2006 Central American and Caribbean Games =

- Location: Cartagena

The tennis competition at the 2006 Central American and Caribbean Games was held in Cartagena, Colombia.

== Medal summary ==
=== Men's events ===
Event	Gold	Silver	Bronze
Singles	Jhonson García (DOM)	Yohny Romero (VEN)	Víctor Estrella (DOM); Pablo González (COL)
Doubles	Michael Quintero and Carlos Salamanca (COL)	Víctor Estrella and Jhonson García (DOM)	Ricardo Chile and Sandor Martínez (CUB); Daniel Garza and Carlos Palencia (MEX)

=== Women's events ===
Event	Gold	Silver	Bronze
Singles	Kristina Brandi (PUR)	Milagros Sequera (VEN)	Daniela Múñoz Gallegos (MEX); Melissa Torres Sandoval (MEX)
Doubles	Mariana Muci and Milagros Sequera (VEN)	Yanet Núñez Mojarena and Yamilé Fors (CUB)	Erika Clarke and Valeria Pulido (MEX); Kristina Brandi and Vilmarie Castellvi (PUR)

=== Mixed event ===
Event	Gold	Silver	Bronze
Doubles	Yohny Romero and Milagros Sequera (VEN)	Gilberto Álvarez and Vilmarie Castellvi (PUR)	Ricardo Chile and Yamilé Fors (CUB); Víctor Estrella and Daysi Espinal (DOM)
