= Paulo Taicher =

Brazilian tennis player

- Full name: Paulo Henrique Taicher
- Country (sports): Brazil
- Born: 4 June 1977 (age 49) Rio Grande do Sul, Brazil
- Prize money: $38,430

Singles
- Highest ranking: No. 210 (5 July 1999)

Doubles
- Highest ranking: No. 186 (18 October 1999)
Medal record
Pan American Games
Gold medal – first place	1999 Winnipeg	Men's Doubles
Bronze medal – third place	1999 Winnipeg	Men's singles

Paulo Henrique Taicher (born 4 June 1977) is a former professional tennis player from Brazil.

Taicher, who comes from Novo Hamburgo, is most noted for his performance at the 1999 Pan American Games in Winnipeg, where he won two medals. He partnered with André Sá to win the men's doubles gold and was a bronze medalist in the singles.

== Challenger titles ==
=== Doubles: (1) ===
No.	Year	Tournament	Surface	Partner	Opponents	Score
1.	1999	Quito, Ecuador	Clay	(Argentina) Andrés Zingman	(Mexico) Óscar Ortiz (Mexico) Marco Osorio	7–5, 4–6, 7–5
