= Carlos Drada =

Colombian tennis player

- Full name: Carlos Alberto Drada
- Country (sports): Colombia
- Born: 9 February 1975 (age 51)
- Plays: Left-handed
- Prize money: $10,010

Singles
- Career record: 0–1
- Highest ranking: No. 490 (10 June 1996)

Doubles
- Career record: 0–1
- Highest ranking: No. 423 (23 May 1994)

Carlos Drada (born Feb 9 1975) is a Colombian former professional tennis player.

Drada, a left-handed player from Cali, represented the Colombia Davis Cup team in two ties, against Canada in 1995 and the Bahamas in 2000. His only ATP Tour main draw appearance came at the 1996 Colombia Open, where he lost in the first round to Gastón Etlis in three sets. He had a best singles ranking of 607 in the world.

Drada was a collegiate tennis player for the University of Kentucky. During his junior year he had a win over James Blake, the then top-ranked college player. He finished runner-up to Alex Kim in the 2000 NCAA singles championship, despite going into the tournament unseeded. In the semi-finals he again defeated the top ranked player in Jeff Morrison, who was also the defending champion.

Drada served as the Head Coach of Women’s Tennis at the University of Kentucky from 2006 to 2023.

On July 23, 2026 Drada joined the Harvard Women's Tennis Staff as Assistant Coach for the 2026-2027 Season.
