= Cristiano Testa =

Brazilian tennis player

- Full name: Cristiano Testa
- Country (sports): Brazil
- Born: 23 September 1973 (age 53)
- Plays: Left-handed
- Prize money: $56,825

Singles
- Highest ranking: No. 416 (26 August 1996)

Doubles
- Career record: 3–6
- Career titles: 0
- Highest ranking: No. 109 (17 January 2000)

Grand Slam doubles results
- Australian Open: 1R (2000)

Cristiano Testa (born 23 September 1973) is a former professional tennis player from Brazil. He is also known as Testinha.

== Biography ==
Testa, a left-handed player, represented Brazil's Junior Davis Cup team in 1989.

Turning professional in 1993, Testa competed mostly on tour as a doubles specialist. His best performance came at the 1996 Colombia Open where he made the semi-finals with Diego del Río. He made a total of 11 Challenger doubles finals, for three titles, in Medellín, Eisenach and Santiago. In 2000 he reached his highest doubles ranking of 109 in the world and earned a spot in the main draw of the 2000 Australian Open. He and partner Fernando Meligeni were beaten in the first round by eventual finalists Wayne Black and Andrew Kratzmann.

He now works as a junior tennis coach in Porto Alegre.

== Challenger titles ==
=== Doubles: (3) ===
No.	Year	Tournament	Surface	Partner	Opponents	Score
1.	1998	Medellín, Colombia	Clay	(Brazil) Adriano Ferreira	(Colombia) Juan-Camilo Gamboa (Colombia) Mauricio Hadad	3–6, 6–1, 6–2
2.	1998	Eisenach, Germany	Clay	(Brazil) Jaime Oncins	(Germany) Rene Nicklisch (Germany) Patrick Sommer	6–1, 6–3
3.	1999	Santiago, Chile	Clay	(Brazil) Antonio Prieto	(Spain) Germán Puentes (Spain) Álex López Morón	4–6, 6–4, 6–3
