= Adriano Ferreira =

Brazilian tennis player

- Country (sports): Brazil
- Born: March 16, 1974 (age 51) Bebedouro, Brazil
- Height: 1.96 m (6 ft 5 in)
- Turned pro: 1991
- Plays: Right-handed
- Prize money: US$92,834

Singles
- Career record: 0–0 (ATP Tour level, Grand Slam level, and Davis Cup)
- Career titles: 0
- Highest ranking: No. 146 (November 9, 1998)

Grand Slam singles results
- French Open: Q1 (1999)
- Wimbledon: Q1 (1998, 1999)
- US Open: Q1 (1998, 1999)

Doubles
- Career record: 1–3 (ATP Tour level, Grand Slam level, and Davis Cup)
- Career titles: 0
- Highest ranking: No. 140 (March 8, 1999)

Grand Slam doubles results
- Wimbledon: 1R (1999)
- US Open: Q1 (1998)

Adriano Ferreira (born March 16, 1974) is a former professional tennis player from Brazil.

== Titles (8) ==
=== Singles (2) ===
Legend Grand Slam (0) Tennis Masters Cup (0) ATP Masters Series (0) ATP Tour (0) Challengers (2)	Titles by surface Hard (1) Grass (0) Clay (1) Carpet (0)

No.	Date	Tournament	Surface	Opponent in the final	Score
1.	May 25, 1998	Medellín, Colombia	Clay	(Netherlands) Rogier Wassen	6–0, 6–4
2.	September 28, 1998	Caracas, Venezuela	Clay	(Venezuela) Kepler Orellana	6–1, 6–4

=== Doubles (6) ===
Legend Grand Slam (0) Tennis Masters Cup (0) ATP Masters Series (0) ATP Tour (0) Challengers (6)	Titles by surface Hard (1) Grass (0) Clay (4) Carpet (1)

No.	Date	Tournament	Surface	Partnering	Opponents in the final	Score
1.	May 25, 1998	Medellín, Colombia	Clay	(Brazil) Cristiano Testa	(Colombia) Juan-Camilo Gamboa (Colombia) Mauricio Hadad	3–6, 6–1, 6–2
2.	September 7, 1998	Quito, Ecuador	Clay	(Mexico) Óscar Ortiz	(Venezuela) Kepler Orellana (Venezuela) Jimy Szymanski	6–3, 6–4
3.	February 8, 1999	Wolfsburg, Germany	Carpet	(Venezuela) Maurice Ruah	(Germany) Karsten Braasch (Germany) Dirk Dier	Walkover
4.	May 28, 2001	Salvador, Brazil	Hard	(Brazil) Daniel Melo	(Mexico) Alejandro Hernández (Croatia) Ivo Karlović	1–6, 6–3, 7–6^{(3)}
5.	August 20, 2001	Ribeirão Preto, Brazil	Clay	(Brazil) Antonio Prieto	(Argentina) Sergio Roitman (Argentina) Andrés Schneiter	6–1, 6–7^{(6)}, 6–4
6.	September 24, 2001	São Paulo, Brazil	Clay	(Argentina) Edgardo Massa	(Brazil) Marcos Daniel (Brazil) Ricardo Mello	Walkover

== Runners-up (5) ==
=== Singles (1) ===
Legend Grand Slam (0) Tennis Masters Cup (0) ATP Masters Series (0) ATP Tour (0) Challengers (1)	Finals by surface Hard (0) Grass (1) Clay (0) Carpet (0)

No.	Date	Tournament	Surface	Opponent in the final	Score
1.	July 6, 1998	Bristol, England	Grass	(Belgium) Denis van Uffelen	6–3, 6–2

=== Doubles (4) ===
Legend Grand Slam (0) Tennis Masters Cup (0) ATP Masters Series (0) ATP Tour (0) Challengers (4)	Finals by surface Hard (2) Grass (0) Clay (2) Carpet (0)

No.	Date	Tournament	Surface	Partnering	Opponents in the final	Score
1.	August 25, 1997	Santa Cruz, Bolivia	Clay	(Brazil) Egberto Caldas	(Argentina) Mariano Hood (Argentina) Sebastián Prieto	7–6, 4–6, 6–3
2.	July 23, 2001	Campos do Jordão, Brazil	Hard	(Brazil) Daniel Melo	(Australia) Dejan Petrovic (Israel) Andy Ram	6–3, 6–4
3.	August 6, 2001	Gramado, Brazil	Hard	(Brazil) Daniel Melo	(Australia) Dejan Petrovic (Israel) Andy Ram	6–4, 6–4
4.	August 27, 2001	Campinas, Brazil	Clay	(Brazil) Antônio Prieto	(Argentina) Edgardo Massa (Brazil) Flávio Saretta	1–6, 7–6^{(5)}, 6–4
