= Tobias Hildebrand =

Swedish tennis player

- Country (sports): Sweden
- Born: 20 October 1975 (age 49)
- Plays: Right-handed
- Prize money: $22,199

Singles
- Career record: 0–0
- Career titles: 0 ITF
- Highest ranking: No. 394 (29 September 1997)

Doubles
- Career record: 0–2
- Career titles: 2 Challenger, 1 ITF
- Highest ranking: No. 190 (5 July 1999)
- Last updated on: 26 August 2019.

Tobias Hildebrand (born 20 October 1975) is a retired Swedish tennis player.

Hildebrand has a career high ATP singles ranking of 394 achieved on 29 September 1997. He also has a career high doubles ranking of 190 achieved on 5 July 1999.

Hildebrand has won 2 ATP Challenger doubles titles at the 1998 Tampere Open and the 1998 Scheveningen Challenger.

== Tour titles ==
Legend
Grand Slam (0)
ATP Masters Series (0)
ATP Tour (0)
Challengers (2)
ITF Futures (1)

=== Doubles ===
Result	Date	Category	Tournament	Surface	Partner	Opponents	Score
Win	June 1998	Futures	Oulu, Finland	Clay	(Finland) Ville Liukko	(Sweden) Johan Landsberg (Sweden) Klas Pettersson	7–5, 6–3
Win	July 1998	Challenger	Tampere, Finland	Clay	(Sweden) Fredrik Lovén	(Austria) Julian Knowle (Belgium) Christophe Rochus	7–6, 1–6, 6–0
Win	August 1998	Challenger	Scheveningen, Netherlands	Clay	(Argentina) Agustín Calleri	(Argentina) Sebastián Prieto (Argentina) Martín Rodríguez	6–2, 3–6, 6–2
