= Ricardo Chile =

Cuban tennis player (born 1982)

- Full name: Ricardo Chile-Fonte
- Country (sports): Cuba
- Born: 7 January 1982 (age 43)
- Prize money: $23,491

Singles
- Career record: 12–10 (Davis Cup)
- Highest ranking: No. 519 (15 Aug 2005)

Doubles
- Career record: 6–1 (Davis Cup)
- Highest ranking: No. 465 (15 Aug 2005)
Medal record
Central American and Caribbean Games
Bronze medal – third place	2006 Cartagena	Men's Doubles
Bronze medal – third place	2006 Cartagena	Mixed Doubles

Ricardo Chile-Fonte (born 7 January 1982) is a Cuban former professional tennis player.

Debuting in 2000, Chile appeared in 17 ties for the Cuba Davis Cup team, winning 12 singles and 6 doubles rubbers for his country. His Davis Cup career included a five-set win over Uruguay's Pablo Cuevas.

Chile represented Cuba at the 2003 Pan American Games in Santo Domingo and won two bronze medals at the 2006 Central American and Caribbean Games, both in doubles events.
