= Denis van Uffelen =

Former professional tennis player

- Country (sports): Belgium
- Born: 5 July 1971 (age 54) Brussels, Belgium
- Prize money: $18,359

Singles
- Highest ranking: No. 264 (13 July 1998)

Grand Slam singles results
- Australian Open: Q1 (1998)
- Wimbledon: Q1 (1995)
- US Open: Q1 (1998)

Doubles
- Highest ranking: No. 590 (7 November 1994)

Denis van Uffelen (born 5 July 1971) is a Belgian former professional tennis player.

Born in Brussels, van Uffelen competed on the professional tour in the 1990s and reached a career high singles world ranking of 264. His biggest achievement was winning the 1998 Bristol Challenger tournament, which he had entered into as a qualifier. He beat Adriano Ferreira in the final.

== ATP Challenger titles ==
=== Singles: (1) ===
No.	Date	Tournament	Surface	Opponents	Score
1.	Jul 1998	West of England Challenger, Bristol	Grass	(Brazil) Adriano Ferreira	6–3, 6–2
