= Yohny Romero =

Venezuelan tennis player (born 1978)

- Country (sports): Venezuela
- Born: 30 November 1978 (age 47) Caracas, Venezuela
- Plays: Right-handed
- Prize money: $69,353

Singles
- Career record: 8–9 (Davis Cup)
- Highest ranking: No. 262 (24 April 2006)

Grand Slam singles results
- Australian Open: Q1 (2006, 2007)
- Wimbledon: Q1 (2006)

Doubles
- Career record: 4–3 (Davis Cup)
- Highest ranking: No. 262 (22 June 1998)
Medal record
Pan American Games
Bronze medal – third place	1999 Winnipeg	Men's doubles
Central American and Caribbean Games
Gold medal – first place	2006 Cartagena	Mixed doubles
Silver medal – second place	2006 Cartagena	Men's singles

Yohny Romero (born 30 November 1978) is a Venezuelan former professional tennis player.

== Tennis career ==
Romero, who was born in Caracas, represented Venezuela in the Davis Cup from 1999 to 2010, featuring in a total of 16 ties. He won eight singles and four doubles rubbers.

While competing on the professional tour, Romero reached a career high singles ranking of 262 in the world, with qualifying draw appearances at the Australian Open and Wimbledon.

Romero partnered with Maurice Ruah to win a bronze medal for Venezuela in doubles at the 1999 Pan American Games. He was a mixed doubles gold medalist at the 2006 Central American and Caribbean Games, where he also claimed a silver medal in the singles event.

Since retiring he served as team captain of Venezuela's Fed Cup team for several years, then in 2017 took over as Davis Cup captain.
