= Nicolás Lapentti =

Ecuadorian tennis player

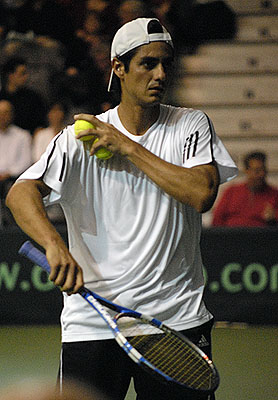
- Country (sports): Ecuador
- Residence: Miami, Florida, U.S.
- Born: 13 August 1976 (age 50) Guayaquil, Ecuador
- Height: 1.88 m (6 ft 2 in)
- Turned pro: 1995
- Retired: 2011 (last match 2017)
- Plays: Right-handed (two-handed backhand)
- Prize money: $6,313,898

Singles
- Career record: 321–299
- Career titles: 5
- Highest ranking: No. 6 (17 April 2000)

Grand Slam singles results
- Australian Open: SF (1999)
- French Open: 4R (2000)
- Wimbledon: QF (2002)
- US Open: 3R (2001)

Other tournaments
- Tour Finals: RR (1999)
- Grand Slam Cup: QF (1999)
- Olympic Games: 1R (1996, 2004, 2008)

Doubles
- Career record: 153–159
- Career titles: 3
- Highest ranking: No. 32 (10 May 1999)

Grand Slam doubles results
- Australian Open: QF (1999, 2001, 2003)
- French Open: QF (1998)
- Wimbledon: 3R (2003)
- US Open: 3R (2003)

Team competitions
- Davis Cup: 1R (2001, 2010)

Nicolás Alexander Lapentti Gómez (Spanish pronunciation: [nikoˈlas laˈpenti]; born 13 August 1976) is an Ecuadorian former professional tennis player. Lapentti was ranked world No. 6 in singles by the ATP in April 2000.

== Personal information ==
Lapentti began playing tennis at the age of six. His brothers, Giovanni and Leonardo, uncle Andrés, and cousins Roberto Quiroz and Emilio Gómez have also been professional tennis players. His brother Giovanni, reached a career-high singles ranking of world No. 110 in May 2005. In addition, the other brother Leonardo, was active at the lower levels of professional tennis. His father, also named Nicolás Lapentti, was a star basketball player at the college (now University) of St. Thomas in Minnesota from 1963 to 1967, and played on the Ecuador Olympic team. He set up the Nicolás Lapentti Foundation in late 2000 to help bring tennis to the underprivileged, and develop future champions. Other interests include soccer and reading Robert Ludlum books.

== Professional ==
=== Juniors ===
Lapentti first came to the tennis world's attention an outstanding junior player who won the Orange Bowl in Florida in 1994, when he also captured the junior doubles titles at the French Open (partnering with Gustavo Kuerten) and the US Open.

=== 1995: Turned Pro, First ATP title ===
Lapentti turned professional in 1995 and won his first top-level singles title later that year in Bogotá.

=== 1999-00: Australian Open semifinalist, world No. 6 ===
Lapentti was a semifinalist at the 1999 Australian Open, defeating Thomas Johansson, Magnus Norman, Mikael Tillström, Andrew Ilie and Karol Kučera before losing to Thomas Enqvist. He also won two tour singles titles that year and reached his career-high singles ranking of world No. 6 in April 2000.

=== 2002 ===
In 2002, Lapentti won his fifth tour singles title at St. Pölten, beating Fernando Vicente in straight sets in the final. In the second round of that tournament, his rival, Irakli Labadze, faced four match points but was not able to convert any of them. Lapentti finally won the tough three-set match.

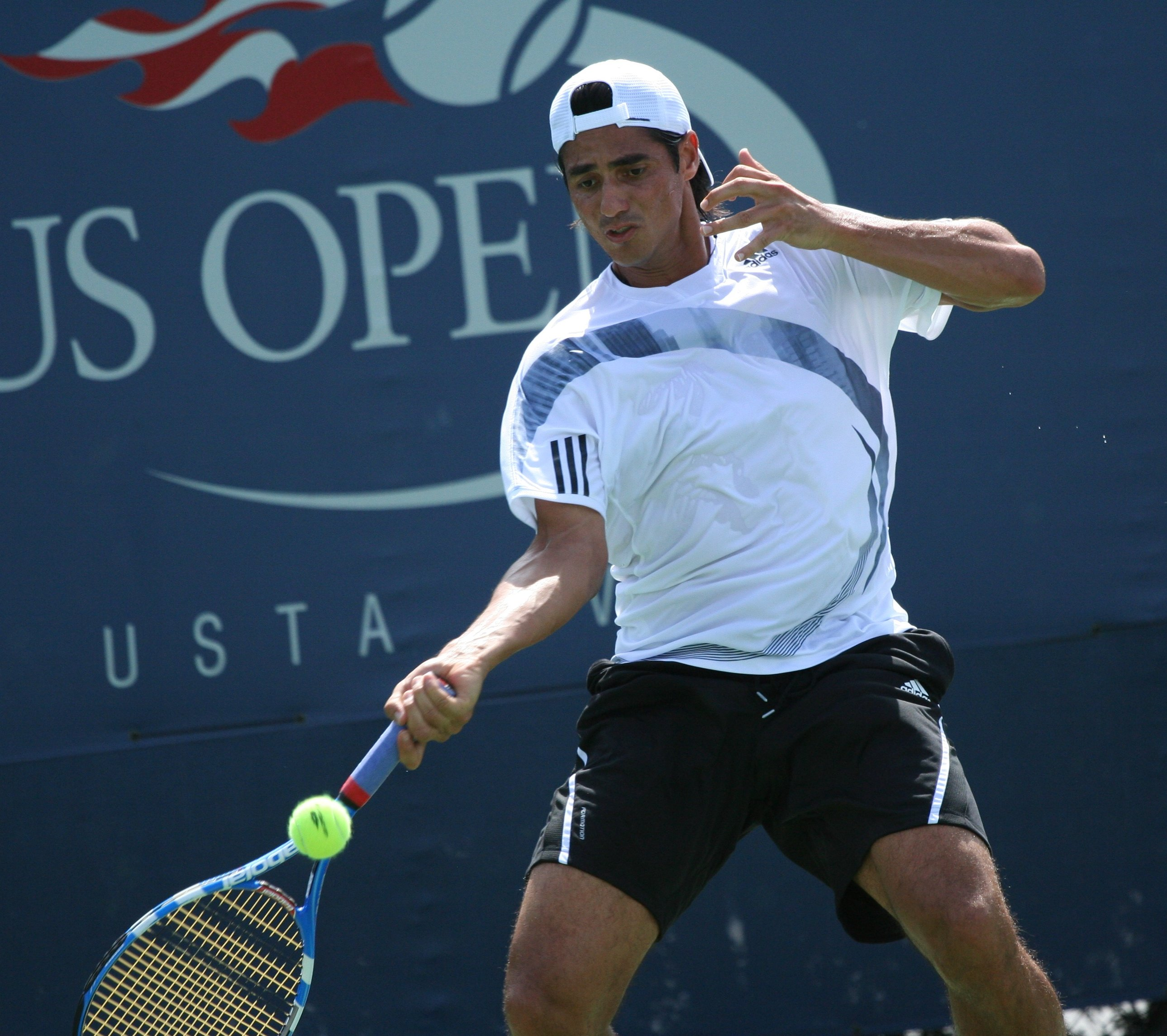
Nicolás Lapentti at the 2009 US Open

=== 2008-09 ===
At the 2008 Cincinnati Open, Lapentti defeated David Ferrer in second round, Fernando Verdasco in the third round and faced No. 2 seed Rafael Nadal in the quarterfinals where he lost in straight sets. With that victory over Lapentti, Nadal clinched the world No. 1 ranking for the first time. In his last participation in a Grand Slam, he had to retire against Novak Djokovic at the 2009 French Open.

=== 2017 ===
In 2017, it was announced that Nicolás would compete in the Ecuador Open doubles draw alongside brother Giovanni, playing in the final event of his career.

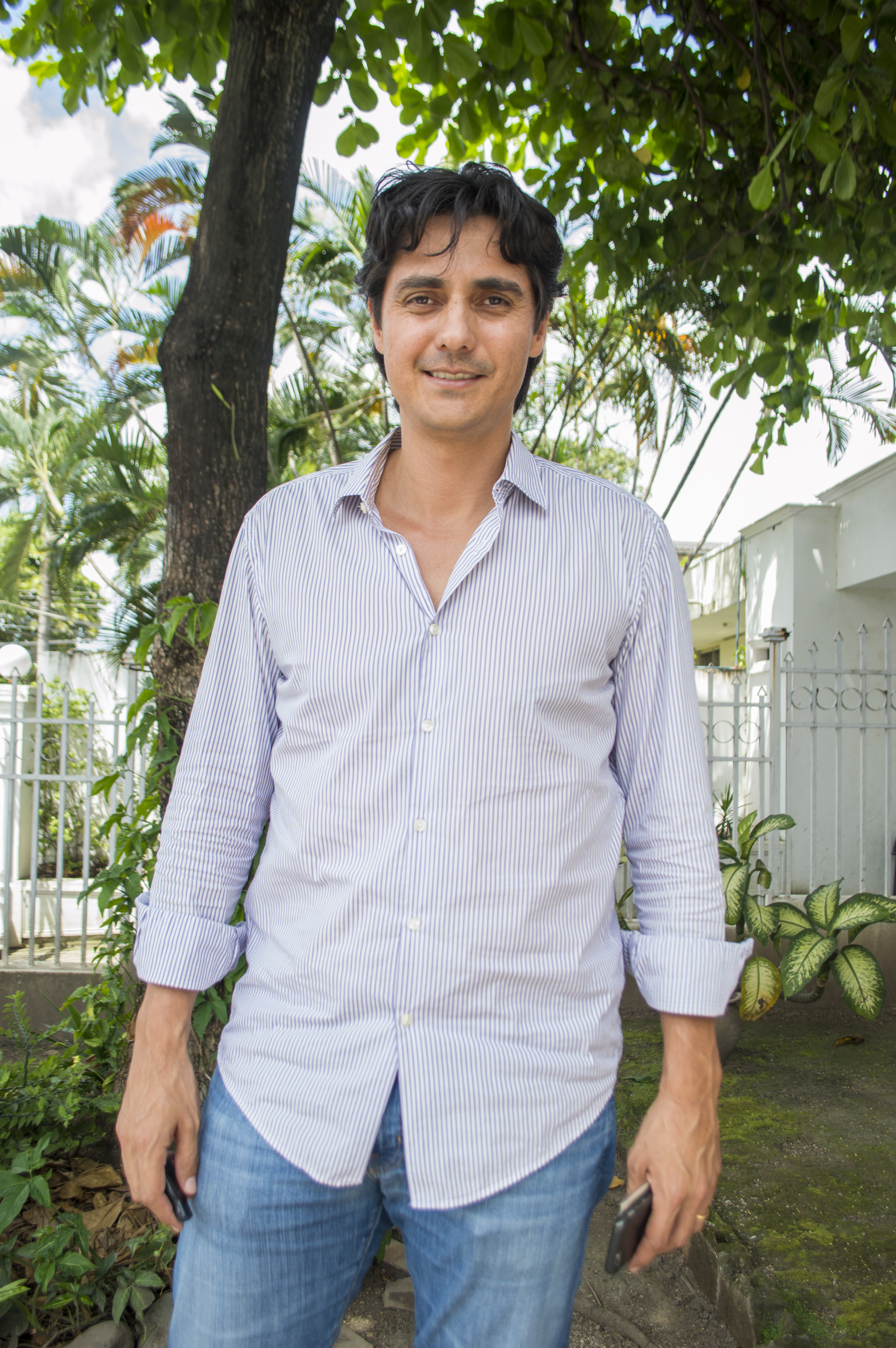
Nicolás Lapentti in 2017

== Davis Cup ==
He has also been a member of the Ecuador Davis Cup team since 1993. Representing his country in Davis Cup since he was 17, and won the deciding rubber against Great Britain (July 2000) to put Ecuador in the World Group. Moreover, he owns the Davis Cup record for most matches won in five sets, with a total of 13 victories.

== ATP career finals ==
=== Singles: 12 (5 wins, 7 losses) ===
Legend Grand Slam tournaments (0–0) Tennis Masters Cup (0–0) ATP Super 9 / ATP Masters Series (0–0) ATP Championship Series / ATP International Series Gold (2–1) ATP World Series / ATP International Series (3–6)	Finals by surface Hard (1–1) Clay (3–6) Grass (0–0) Carpet (1–0)	Finals by setting Outdoor (4–7) Indoor (1–0)

Result	W/L	Date	Tournament	Tier	Surface	Opponent	Score
Win	1–0	Sep 1995	Bogotá Open, Colombia	World Series	Clay	(Colombia) Miguel Tobón	2–6, 6–1, 6–4
Loss	1–1	Sep 1996	Bogotá Open, Colombia	World Series	Clay	(Austria) Thomas Muster	7–6^{(8–6)}, 2–6, 3–6
Loss	1–2	Oct 1997	Bogotá Open, Colombia	World Series	Clay	(Spain) Francisco Clavet	3–6, 3–6
Loss	1–3	Jul 1999	Swiss Open, Switzerland	World Series	Clay	(Spain) Albert Costa	6–7^{(4–7)}, 3–6, 4–6
Win	2–3	Aug 1999	Indianapolis Tennis Championships, United States	Champ. Series	Hard	(United States) Vince Spadea	4–6, 6–4, 6–4
Win	3–3	Oct 1999	Grand Prix de Lyon, France	World Series	Carpet (i)	(Australia) Lleyton Hewitt	6–3, 6–2
Loss	3–4	Oct 2000	Japan Open, Tokyo	Intl. Gold	Hard	(Netherlands) Sjeng Schalken	4–6, 6–3, 1–6
Win	4–4	Jul 2001	Austrian Open Kitzbühel, Austria	Intl. Gold	Clay	(Spain) Albert Costa	1–6, 6–4, 7–5, 7–5
Loss	4–5	Feb 2002	Santiago Open, Chile	International	Clay	(Chile) Fernando González	3–6, 7–6^{(7–5)}, 6–7^{(4–7)}
Win	5–5	May 2002	St. Pölten, Austria	International	Clay	(Spain) Fernando Vicente	7–5, 6–4
Loss	5–6	Jul 2003	Swedish Open, Båstad	International	Clay	(Argentina) Mariano Zabaleta	3–6, 4–6
Loss	5–7	Sep 2006	Campionati Internazionali di Sicilia, Italy	International	Clay	(Italy) Filippo Volandri	7–5, 1–6, 3–6

=== Doubles: 7 (3 wins, 4 losses) ===
Legend Grand Slam tournaments (0–0) Tennis Masters Cup (0–0) ATP Super 9 / ATP Masters Series (0–0) ATP Championship Series / ATP International Series Gold (0–0) ATP World Series / ATP International Series (3–4)	Finals by surface Hard (1–0) Clay (2–4) Grass (0–0) Carpet (0–0)	Finals by setting Outdoor (3–4) Indoor (0–0)

Result	W/L	Date	Tournament	Tier	Surface	Partner	Opponents	Score
Loss	0–1	Sep 1996	Bogotá Open, Colombia	World Series	Clay	(Ecuador) Pablo Campana	(Venezuela) Nicolás Pereira (Czech Republic) David Rikl	3–6, 6–7
Win	1–1	Aug 1997	Dutch Open, Amsterdam	World Series	Clay	(Australia) Paul Kilderry	(Australia) Andrew Kratzmann (Belgium) Libor Pimek	3–6, 7–5, 7–6
Win	2–1	Oct 1997	Mexican Open, Acapulco	World Series	Clay	(Argentina) Daniel Orsanic	(Mexico) Luis Herrera (Mexico) Mariano Sánchez	4–6, 6–3, 7–6
Loss	2–2	Nov 1997	Santiago Open, Chile	World Series	Clay	(Spain) Julián Alonso	(Netherlands) Hendrik Jan Davids (Australia) Andrew Kratzmann	6–7, 7–5, 4–6
Win	3–2	Jan 1999	Adelaide International, Australia	World Series	Hard	(Brazil) Gustavo Kuerten	(United States) Jim Courier (United States) Patrick Galbraith	6–4, 6–4
Loss	3–3	May 1999	Prague Open, Czech Republic	World Series	Clay	(United States) Mark Keil	(Czech Republic) Martin Damm (Czech Republic) Radek Štěpánek	0–6, 2–6
Loss	3–4	Feb 2004	Santiago Open, Chile	International	Clay	(Argentina) Martín Rodríguez	(Argentina) Juan Ignacio Chela (Argentina) Gastón Gaudio	6–7^{(2–7)}, 6–7^{(3–7)}

== Singles performance timeline ==
Key
W	F	SF	QF	#R	RR	Q#	P#	DNQ	A	Z#	PO	G	S	B	NMS	NTI	P	NH

(W) winner; (F) finalist; (SF) semifinalist; (QF) quarterfinalist; (#R) rounds 4, 3, 2, 1; (RR) round-robin stage; (Q#) qualification round; (P#) preliminary round; (DNQ) did not qualify; (A) absent; (Z#) Davis/Fed Cup Zonal Group (with number indication) or (PO) play-off; (G) gold, (S) silver or (B) bronze Olympic/Paralympic medal; (NMS) not a Masters tournament; (NTI) not a Tier I tournament; (P) postponed; (NH) not held; (SR) strike rate (events won / competed); (W–L) win–loss record.

Tournament	1993	1994	1995	1996	1997	1998	1999	2000	2001	2002	2003	2004	2005	2006	2007	2008	2009	2010	SR	W–L
Grand Slam tournaments
Australian Open	A	A	A	1R	A	2R	SF	2R	2R	4R	3R	2R	A	A	2R	A	1R	1R	0 / 11	15–11
French Open	A	A	A	1R	2R	1R	2R	4R	2R	1R	3R	1R	Q1	2R	2R	3R	1R	1R	0 / 14	12–14
Wimbledon	A	Q1	A	2R	1R	1R	2R	1R	A	QF	2R	A	A	A	2R	1R	1R	A	0 / 10	8–10
US Open	A	Q1	A	1R	2R	1R	2R	2R	3R	1R	2R	Q1	1R	Q3	1R	1R	2R	A	0 / 12	7–12
Win–loss	0–0	0–0	0–0	1–4	2–3	1–4	8–4	5–4	4–3	7–4	6–4	1–2	0–1	1–1	3–4	2–3	1–4	0–2	0 / 47	42–47
Year-end championships
Tennis Masters Cup	Did not qualify						RR	Did not qualify											0 / 1	0–3
Grand Slam Cup	Was Not Invited						QF	Not Held											0 / 1	1–1
ATP Masters Series
Indian Wells	A	A	A	1R	Q2	3R	A	SF	QF	1R	1R	3R	A	A	A	Q1	3R	A	0 / 8	12–8
Miami	A	Q1	Q2	1R	2R	1R	3R	QF	3R	QF	4R	2R	2R	1R	A	Q1	Q1	2R	0 / 12	14–12
Monte Carlo	A	A	A	A	Q2	1R	2R	1R	1R	1R	1R	A	A	Q1	A	2R	3R	A	0 / 8	4–8
Rome	A	A	A	A	A	2R	QF	2R	SF	1R	1R	1R	A	Q1	A	2R	Q1	Q1	0 / 8	10–8
Hamburg	A	A	A	A	A	2R	SF	1R	3R	1R	1R	2R	Q1	A	Q1	A	NM1		0 / 7	8–7
Canada	A	A	A	A	A	A	A	1R	2R	2R	1R	Q1	Q2	A	A	1R	Q2	A	0 / 5	2–5
Cincinnati	A	A	A	A	A	1R	3R	1R	1R	1R	1R	A	1R	Q1	Q1	QF	Q1	A	0 / 8	5–8
Madrid (Stuttgart)	A	A	A	A	A	A	3R	2R	3R	3R	Q1	A	Q1	A	Q1	Q1	A	A	0 / 4	5–4
Paris	A	A	A	A	A	A	SF	2R	3R	2R	2R	A	1R	A	Q2	Q2	A	A	0 / 6	7–6
Win–loss	0–0	0–0	0–0	0–2	0–1	3–6	16–7	8–9	15–9	7–9	3–8	4–4	1–3	0–1	0–0	5–4	4–2	1–1	0 / 66	67–66
Year-end ranking	326	632	109	121	63	90	7	24	23	29	57	122	95	67	109	86	97	447		

== Top 10 wins ==
Season	1994	1995	1996	1997	1998	1999	2000	2001	2002	2003	2004	2005	2006	2007	2008	2009	2010	Total
Wins	0	0	0	0	1	3	0	4	0	1	0	0	1	0	1	0	0	11

#	Player	Rank	Event	Surface	Rd	Score	LR
1998
1.	(Russia) Yevgeny Kafelnikov	7	Kitzbühel, Austria	Clay	3R	6–4, 6–1	61
1999
2.	(Spain) Àlex Corretja	8	Gstaad, Switzerland	Clay	1R	4–3 ret.	26
3.	(Spain) Carlos Moyá	10	Indianapolis, United States	Hard	QF	6–1, 6–2	20
4.	(Brazil) Gustavo Kuerten	5	Lyon, France	Carpet (i)	QF	5–7, 6–4, 7–5	14
2001
5.	(Sweden) Magnus Norman	5	Indian Wells, United States	Hard	1R	4–6, 6–1, 6–1	27
6.	(United Kingdom) Tim Henman	10	Indian Wells, United States	Hard	3R	6–4, 6–4	27
7.	(Spain) Juan Carlos Ferrero	4	Kitzbühel, Austria	Clay	QF	7–6^{(8–6)}, 6–2	36
8.	(Australia) Lleyton Hewitt	3	Paris Masters, France	Carpet (i)	2R	4–6, 6–4, 6–4	30
2003
9.	(Czech Republic) Jiří Novák	8	Miami Open, United States	Hard	2R	2–6, 6–3, 6–4	39
2006
10	(Russia) Nikolay Davydenko	6	Kitzbühel, Austria	Clay	2R	6–3, 6–3	116
2008
11.	(Spain) David Ferrer	4	Cincinnati, United States	Hard	2R	7–6^{(7–2)}, 3–6, 6–3	89

Awards
Preceded by (United States) Andre Agassi	ATP Most Improved Player; 1999	Succeeded by (Russia) Marat Safin
