= David Critchley =

English football manager

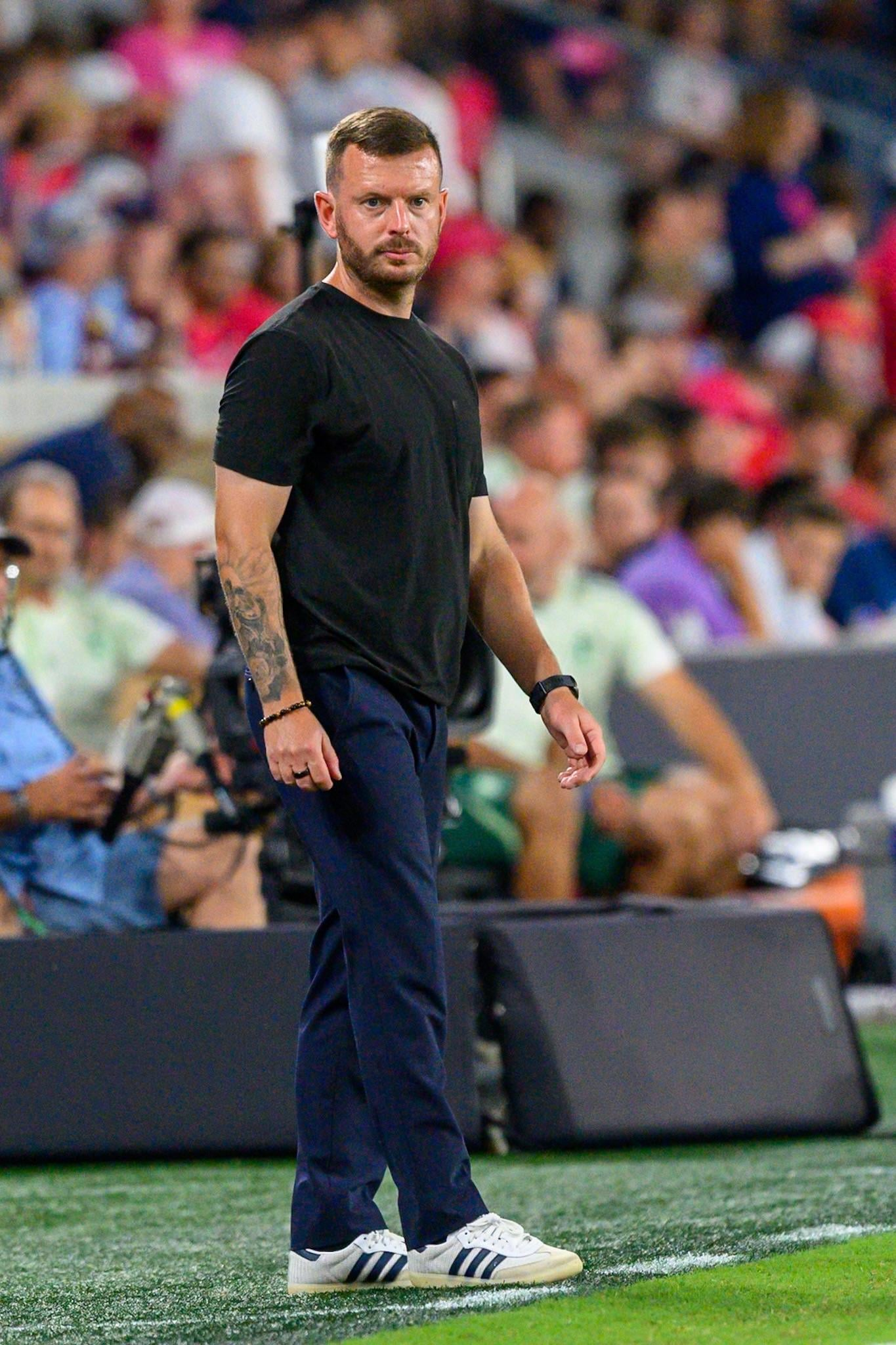
- Critchley with St. Louis City SC in 2025

Personal information
- Date of birth: 9 March 1983 (age 43)
- Place of birth: Liverpool, England

College career
Years	Team	Apps	(Gls)
2009–2013	Oklahoma Wesleyan University		

Managerial career
- 2013–2015: Northeast Oklahoma Football Club (coaching director)
- 2015–2018: Tulsa Soccer Club (technical director)
- 2018–2021: Lou Fusz Athletic (technical director)
- 2021–2024: St. Louis CITY SC Academy
- 2024–2025: St. Louis City 2
- 2025: St. Louis City SC (interim)
- 2026–: St. Louis City 2

David Critchley is an English professional football manager who is the head coach of MLS Next Pro club St. Louis City 2.

After moving to the USA in 2009, Critchley started out as a coaching director at Northeast Oklahoma Football Club, before moving into technical director roles. In 2021, he joined St. Louis City's academy and won two MLS Next Flex tournaments. He became interim manager at St. Louis City SC in 2025.

== Managerial career ==
David Critchley was born in Liverpool, England, before moving to the US in 2009 to play football at the Oklahoma Wesleyan University, where he spent four years. He became a coach at the OWU. In 2013, he was appointed as coaching director at Northeast Oklahoma Football Club.

In 2015, he was appointed technical director of Tulsa Soccer Club. In 2018, he was again appointed technical director, this time with Lou Fusz Athletic.

In 2021, Critchley was appointed to St.Louis CITY SC's Academy. He took the team's U16 team to a title in 2022, winning the MLS Next Flex tournament. In 2023, he led the U17 team to another MLS Next Flex win, as well as a quarter-final appearance in the playoffs.

On 15 November 2024, Critchley was promoted from the St. Louis CITY SC Academy to Head Coach of St. Louis City 2. During his time at the club, he has helped integrate players such as Mykhi Joyner, Caden Glover, Tyson Pearce, and Miguel Perez.

On 28 May 2025, Critchley was announced as interim coach at St. Louis City SC after the departure of head coach Olof Mellberg.

On 9 January 2026, Critchley resumed his position as Head Coach of St. Louis City 2, with Elvir Kafedžić joining him as his assistant coach.

== Managerial statistics ==
As of 28 February 2026

Team	From	To	Record				
Team	From	To	G	W	L	D	Win %
St. Louis City 2	15 November 2024	27 May 2025	11	7	4	0	63.64
St. Louis City SC (interim)	27 May 2025	16 December 2025	19	6	11	2	31.58
St. Louis City 2	9 January 2026	Present	3	3	0	0	100.00
Total			32	15	14	3	46.88
