= Dave Abelson =

Canadian tennis player

- Full name: David Abelson
- Country (sports): Canada
- Born: 13 February 1975 (age 50)
- Plays: Left-handed
- Prize money: $13,156

Singles
- Highest ranking: No. 822 (28 Feb 2000)

Doubles
- Career record: 0–1 (ATP Tour)
- Highest ranking: No. 307 (2 Oct 2000)

David Abelson (born 13 February 1975) is a Canadian former professional tennis player. He played in college for Miami University, competed in the 1997 Maccabiah Games in Israel, and was a Canadian representative at the 1999 Pan American Games in Winnipeg.

== Biography ==
Abelson was a collegiate player for Miami University in 1995-98. He was a MAC Freshman of the Year, and a four-time MAC First Team selection.

He competed for Canada at the 1997 Maccabiah Games in Israel.

Abelson was a Canadian representative at the 1999 Pan American Games in Winnipeg, competing in both singles and doubles. He made the singles second round and the quarter-finals of the doubles.

He won the 1999 Thailand F2 Futures with Australian Ashley Fisher.

In 1999 Abelson was ranked 6th among Canadian men, and in 2000 he was ranked 7th. His hometown at the time was Mont-Royal, Quebec, Canada.

On the professional tour, Abelson made his only ATP Tour main draw appearance at the 2000 Canadian Open, partnering Simon Larose in the doubles event.

== ITF Futures titles ==
=== Doubles: (1) ===
No.	Date	Tournament	Surface	Partner	Opponents	Score
1.	Nov 1999	Thailand F2, Pattaya City	Hard	(Australia) Ashley Fisher	(Poland) Bartłomiej Dąbrowski (Germany) Björn Jacob	6–4, ret.
