= 1996 Cerveza Club Colombia Open =

- Date: 9–15 September
- Edition: 3rd
- Category: World Series
- Draw: 32S / 16D
- Prize money: $303,000
- Surface: Clay / outdoor
- Location: Bogotá, Colombia
- Venue: Club Campestre El Rancho

Champions

Singles
- (Austria) Thomas Muster

Doubles
- (Venezuela) Nicolás Pereira / (Czech Republic) David Rikl
- Cerveza Club Colombia Open

The 1996 Cerveza Club Colombia Open was a men's professional tennis tournament played on outdoor clay courts at the Club Campestre El Rancho in Bogotá in Colombia and was part of the World Series of the 1996 ATP Tour. It was the third edition of the tournament and was held from 9 September through 15 September 1996. First-seeded Thomas Muster, who entered the main draw on a wildcard, won the singles title.

== Finals ==
=== Singles ===
(Austria) Thomas Muster defeated (Ecuador) Nicolás Lapentti 6–7^{(6–8)}, 6–2, 6–3

- It was Muster's 7th title of the year and the 43rd of his career.

=== Doubles ===
(Venezuela) Nicolás Pereira / (Czech Republic) David Rikl defeated (Ecuador) Pablo Campana / (Ecuador) Nicolás Lapentti 6–3, 7–6

- It was Pereira's 2nd title of the year and the 5th of his career. It was Rikl's 2nd title of the year and the 11th of his career.
