= Óscar Ortiz (tennis) =

Mexican tennis player (born 1973)

- Country (sports): Mexico
- Residence: Plantation, Florida, United States
- Born: May 9, 1973 (age 52) Mexico City, Mexico
- Height: 1.83 m (6 ft 0 in)
- Turned pro: 1991
- Plays: Left-handed
- Prize money: $185,806

Singles
- Career record: 1–10 (at ATP Tour-level, Grand Slam-level, and in Davis Cup)
- Career titles: 0; 2 Challenger, 0 Futures
- Highest ranking: No. 141 (29 May 1995)

Grand Slam singles results
- Australian Open: Q2 (1995, 1996)
- French Open: Q1 (1995)
- US Open: Q1 (1994, 1995, 1996)

Other tournaments
- Olympic Games: 2R (1996)

Doubles
- Career record: 9–21 (at ATP Tour-level, Grand Slam-level, and in Davis Cup)
- Career titles: 0; 8 Challenger, 0 Futures
- Highest ranking: No. 122 (15 July 1996)

Grand Slam doubles results
- US Open: 1R (1997)

Other doubles tournaments
- Olympic Games: 1R (1996)
Medal record
Men's Tennis
Representing Mexico
Pan American Games
Silver medal – second place	1999 Winnipeg	Men's doubles
- Last updated on: 1 November 2021.

Óscar Ortiz (born May 9, 1973, in Mexico City) is a former tennis player from Mexico, who turned professional in 1991. The left-hander represented his native country at the 1996 Summer Olympics in Atlanta, where he was defeated in the second round. Ortiz reached his highest singles ATP-ranking on May 29, 1995, when he became the number 141 of the world and became # 1 player in Mexico He won the silver medal at the Pan American Games

Reach number 122 in the ATP in doubles in June 1996. Panamerican Games Captain in Santo Domingo, Dominican Republic 2003 and Rio de Janeiro Brasil 2007 Federation Cup Captain from Mexico 2005 to 2008 Mexican Davis Cup Captain 2006 to 2008.

== ATP Challenger and ITF Futures finals ==
=== Singles: 2 (2–0) ===
Legend ATP Challenger (2–0) ITF Futures (0–0)	Finals by surface Hard (2–0) Clay (0–0) Grass (0–0) Carpet (0–0)

Result	W–L	Date	Tournament	Tier	Surface	Opponent	Score
Win	1–0	Jul 1994	Campos do Jordão, Brazil	Challenger	Hard	(Germany) Jan Weinzierl	7–6, 6–3
Win	2–0	Aug 1994	Fortaleza, Brazil	Challenger	Hard	(Italy) Laurence Tieleman	7–6, 6–1

=== Doubles: 17 (8–9) ===
Legend ATP Challenger (8–7) ITF Futures (0–2)	Finals by surface Hard (5–3) Clay (3–4) Grass (0–0) Carpet (0–2)

Result	W–L	Date	Tournament	Tier	Surface	Partner	Opponents	Score
Win	1–0	Jul 1993	Campinas, Brazil	Challenger	Clay	(Argentina) Gastón Etlis	(Argentina) Juan-Ignacio Garat (Argentina) Roberto Saad	6–4, 6–1
Loss	1–1	Sep 1994	Seoul, South Korea	Challenger	Hard	(Italy) Laurence Tieleman	(United States) Bill Barber (United States) Ari Nathan	6–7, 2–6
Win	2–1	Jun 1995	Bogotá, Colombia	Challenger	Clay	(India) Leander Paes	(Chile) Sergio Cortés (Portugal) João Cunha-Silva	7–6, 7–6
Win	3–1	Aug 1995	Rio de Janeiro, Brazil	Challenger	Hard	(Portugal) João Cunha-Silva	(France) Jean-Philippe Fleurian (Venezuela) Nicolás Pereira	7–5, 4–6, 6–1
Win	4–1	Apr 1996	Sliema, Malta	Challenger	Hard	(Mexico) Alejandro Hernández	(North Macedonia) Aleksandar Kitinov (Germany) Martin Zumpft	6–2, 3–6, 6–1
Loss	4–2	Jun 1996	Bogotá, Colombia	Challenger	Clay	(Mexico) Leonardo Lavalle	(United States) Brett Hansen-Dent (United States) T. J. Middleton	4–6, 3–6
Win	5–2	Jul 1996	São Paulo, Brazil	Challenger	Hard	(Mexico) Alejandro Hernández	(France) Jean-Philippe Fleurian (Portugal) João Cunha-Silva	6–2, 7–6
Win	6–2	Apr 1997	Puerto Vallarta, Mexico	Challenger	Hard	(Mexico) Alejandro Hernández	(United States) Francisco Montana (United States) Jack Waite	4–6, 6–2, 6–1
Loss	6–3	Jun 1997	Braunschweig, Germany	Challenger	Clay	(Socialist Federal Republic of Yugoslavia) Nebojsa Djordjevic	(United States) Brandon Coupe (South Africa) Paul Rosner	4–6, 3–6
Loss	6–4	Sep 1997	Guadalajara, Mexico	Challenger	Clay	(Mexico) Alejandro Hernández	(Brazil) Nelson Aerts (Brazil) André Sá	6–3, 2–6, 4–6
Loss	6–5	Dec 1997	Wismar, Germany	Challenger	Carpet	(Mexico) Bernardo Martínez	(Germany) Lars Burgsmüller (Germany) Michael Kohlmann	4–6, 6–7
Loss	6–6	Mar 1998	Kyoto, Japan	Challenger	Carpet	(Venezuela) Maurice Ruah	(Japan) Takao Suzuki (South Africa) Kevin Ullyett	6–4, 1–6, 4–6
Win	7–6	Sep 1998	Quito, Ecuador	Challenger	Clay	(Brazil) Adriano Ferreira	(Venezuela) Kepler Orellana (Venezuela) Jimy Szymanski	6–3, 6–4
Loss	7–7	Sep 1999	Quito, Ecuador	Challenger	Clay	(Mexico) Marco Osorio	(Brazil) Paulo Taicher (Argentina) Andrés Zingman	5–7, 6–4, 5–7
Win	8–7	Nov 1999	Puebla, Mexico	Challenger	Hard	(Mexico) Marco Osorio	(United States) Jeff Salzenstein (United States) Jim Thomas	6–1, 6–3
Loss	8–8	Jan 2000	USA F2, Altamonte Springs	Futures	Hard	(Venezuela) Jimy Szymanski	(Israel) Jonathan Erlich (Israel) Harel Levy	3–6, 4–6
Loss	8–9	Nov 2000	Mexico F5, Zacatecas	Futures	Hard	(Mexico) Eduardo Morones	(Brazil) Eduardo Bergmann (Hungary) Gergely Kisgyörgy	6–7^{(5–7)}, 5–7

== Performance timeline ==
Key
W	F	SF	QF	#R	RR	Q#	DNQ	A	NH

(W) winner; (F) finalist; (SF) semifinalist; (QF) quarterfinalist; (#R) rounds 4, 3, 2, 1; (RR) round-robin stage; (Q#) qualification round; (DNQ) did not qualify; (A) absent; (NH) not held; (SR) strike rate (events won / competed); (W–L) win–loss record.

=== Singles ===
Tournament	1994	1995	1996	SR	W–L
Grand Slam tournaments
Australian Open	A	Q2	Q2	0 / 0	0–0
French Open	A	Q1	A	0 / 0	0–0
Wimbledon	A	A	A	0 / 0	0–0
US Open	Q1	Q1	Q1	0 / 0	0–0
Win–loss	0–0	0–0	0–0	0 / 0	0–0
ATP Tour Masters 1000
Miami	Q1	Q1	Q3	0 / 0	0–0
Canada	Q3	A	A	0 / 0	0–0
Win–loss	0–0	0–0	0–0	0 / 0	0–0
