= Marco Osorio =

Mexican tennis player

- Full name: Marco Osorio
- Country (sports): Mexico
- Born: 1 April 1972 (age 53); Mexico City, Mexico
- Plays: Right-handed
- Prize money: $61,889

Singles
- Career record: 2–3
- Career titles: 0
- Highest ranking: No. 268 (13 April 1998)

Doubles
- Career record: 2–4
- Career titles: 0
- Highest ranking: No. 163 (12 October 1998)

Marco Osorio (born 1 April 1972) is a former professional tennis player from Mexico.

== Biography ==
Osorio made his first appearance at ATP Tour level in 1997, at his home tournament in Mexico City. It was the only time he made the main draw of a singles event and he was beaten in first round by Alejandro Hernández.

As a doubles player he won two Challenger tournaments and had his best ATP Tour performance at the 1998 Legg Mason Tennis Classic in Washington, where he teamed up with Bobby Kokavec to make the quarter-finals.

He played Davis Cup for the first time in 1998, when the Mexican team went to Cali to compete against Colombia and lost 2–3. His only appearance came in the doubles, which he and partner David Roditi lost in a five set match. In 1999 he featured in two further ties for Mexico, wins over Paraguay and Cuba. He played both singles rubbers in each of the ties and won the decisive fifth rubber to defeat Cuba, over Sandor Martínez-Breijo.

At the 1999 Pan American Games in Winnipeg he made the third round of the men's singles, but had more of an impact in the doubles competition, by claiming the silver medal. He and partner Óscar Ortiz upset the top seeds from the United States, the Bryan brothers, in the semi-finals. They lost the final to Brazil's Andre Sa and Paulo Taicher.

He played two more Davis Cup ties in 2000, with Mexico winning in Costa Rica then Guatemala.

== Challenger titles ==
=== Doubles: (2) ===
No.	Year	Tournament	Surface	Partner	Opponents	Score
1.	1997	Quito, Ecuador	Clay	(Mexico) Bernardo Martínez	(Paraguay) Ramón Delgado (Argentina) Martín García	6–4, 6–4
2.	1999	Puebla, Mexico	Hard	(Mexico) Óscar Ortz	(United States) Jeff Salzenstein (United States) Jim Thomas	6–1, 6–3

== See also ==
- List of Mexico Davis Cup team representatives
