= Federico Dondo =

Uruguayan tennis player (born 1971)

- Full name: Enrique Federico Dondo Umpierre
- Country (sports): Uruguay
- Born: 18 October 1971 (age 53); Uruguay
- Plays: Right-handed
- Prize money: $56,725

Singles
- Career record: 1–1
- Highest ranking: No. 232 (12 May 1997)

Doubles
- Career record: 2–2
- Highest ranking: No. 340 (16 September 1996)

Enrique Federico Dondo Umpierre (born 18 October 1971) is a former professional tennis player from Uruguay.

== Biography ==
Dondo, who comes from the city of Salto, appeared in 23 Davis Cup ties for Uruguay, the first in 1994.

A right-handed player, he made his only ATP Tour main draw in singles at the 1996 Colombia Open in Bogota, beating sixth seeded countryman Marcelo Filippini, before losing in the second round to Alejandro Hernández. In doubles he was a two-time ATP Tour quarter-finalist, partnering Marcelo Filippini.

He featured in the qualifying draws at both the French Open and Wimbledon in 1997.

At the 1999 Pan American Games he lost to Cecil Mamiit in the quarter-finals.

Retiring in 2004, he began coaching that year at San Isidro Lomas in Las Piedras.
