= Sandor Martínez =

Cuban tennis player

- Full name: Sandor Martínez-Breijo
- Country (sports): Cuba
- Born: 21 March 1981 (age 43)
- Plays: Right-handed
- Prize money: $14,022

Singles
- Career record: 4–9 (Davis Cup)
- Highest ranking: No. 1018 (11 Sep 2000)

Doubles
- Career record: 18–8 (Davis Cup)
- Highest ranking: No. 494 (4 Dec 2000)
Medal record
Central American and Caribbean Games
Gold medal – first place	1998 Maracaibo	Men's Team
Bronze medal – third place	2006 Cartagena	Men's Doubles

Sandor Martínez-Breijo (born 21 March 1981) is a Cuban former professional tennis player.

Martínez holds the Cuban record for the most Davis Cup appearances, featuring in a total of 29 ties between 1998 and 2009. He is the team's most successful doubles player, with 18 wins in doubles rubbers, to go with his four singles wins.

At the 1998 Central American and Caribbean Games, Martínez won a gold medal for Cuba in the team event, alongside Lázaro Navarro and Juan Pino. He also represented Cuba in the 1999 and 2007 editions of the Pan American Games.
