= 2016 Tiburon Challenger – Singles =

Singles
- 2016 Tiburon Challenger

Final
- Champion: (Barbados) Darian King
- Runner-up: (United States) Michael Mmoh
- Score: 7–6^{(7–2)}, 6–2

Events
Singles	Doubles
← 2015 ·	Tiburon Challenger	· 2017 →

Tim Smyczek was the defending champion but lost in the semifinals to Michael Mmoh.

Darian King won the title after defeating Mmoh 7–6^{(7–2)}, 6–2 in the final.

== Seeds ==
1. (Germany) Benjamin Becker (second round, retired)
2. (United States) Bjorn Fratangelo (quarterfinals)
3. (United States) Tim Smyczek (semifinals)
4. (United States) Frances Tiafoe (quarterfinals)
5. (United States) Dennis Novikov (quarterfinals)
6. (United States) Stefan Kozlov (second round)
7. (United States) Ernesto Escobedo (first round)
8. (France) Quentin Halys (second round)

== Draw ==
=== Key ===
- Q = Qualifier
- WC = Wild card
- LL = Lucky loser
- Alt = Alternate
- SE = Special exempt
- PR = Protected ranking
- ITF = ITF entry
- JE = Junior exempt
- w/o = Walkover
- r = Retired
- d = Defaulted
- SR = Special ranking

=== Finals ===
Semifinals
(Barbados) Darian King	4	7	7
WC	(United States) Mackenzie McDonald	6	5	5
3	(United States) Tim Smyczek	6	3	6^{6}
Q	(United States) Michael Mmoh	2	6	7^{8}

Final
(Barbados) Darian King	7^{7}	6
Q	(United States) Michael Mmoh	6^{2}	2

=== Top half ===
First round
1	(Germany) B Becker	7^{7}	6
(United States) T Paul	6^{1}	2
(India) Y Bhambri	2	6	3
(Barbados) D King	6	3	6
WC	(United States) B Baker	6	6
(United States) A Krajicek	4	3
WC	(United States) Robbie C. Bellamy	3	2
5	(United States) D Novikov	6	6
4	(United States) F Tiafoe	6	3	7
(United States) A Sarkissian	4	6	5
SE	(Australia) J-P Smith	6	3	6
(El Salvador) M Arévalo	3	6	3
(Canada) P Polansky	3	4
WC	(United States) M McDonald	6	6
Q	(Italy) S Caruso	6	2	6
7	(United States) E Escobedo	3	6	3

Second round
1	(Germany) B Becker	7^{7}	2	2^{r}
(Barbados) D King	6^{3}	6	4
WC	(United States) B Baker	4	6	1
5	(United States) D Novikov	6	3	6
4	(United States) F Tiafoe	6	6
SE	(Australia) J-P Smith	3	3
WC	(United States) M McDonald	7^{7}	6
Q	(Italy) S Caruso	6^{3}	2

Quarterfinals
(Barbados) D King	7	6
5	(United States) D Novikov	5	2
4	(United States) F Tiafoe	6	6^{5}	5
WC	(United States) M McDonald	3	7^{7}	7

Semifinals
(Barbados) D King	4	7	7
WC	(United States) M McDonald	6	5	5

=== Bottom half ===
First round
8	(France) Q Halys	5	7^{7}	6
(Slovenia) B Rola	7	6^{5}	1
(Slovenia) G Žemlja	1	4
(United States) M Krueger	6	6
(United States) D Nguyen	4	4
(Australia) S Groth	6	6
Q	(United Kingdom) B Klein	4	1^{r}
3	(United States) T Smyczek	6	2
6	(United States) S Kozlov	6	6
(Brazil) G Clezar	2	2
SE	(United States) T Sandgren	6	6^{5}	0^{r}
Q	(United States) M Mmoh	4	7^{7}	2
(Belgium) J De Loore	6	7^{10}
Q	(United Kingdom) L Glasspool	2	6^{8}
WC	(United States) N Rubin	7^{7}	5	3
2	(United States) B Fratangelo	6^{5}	7	6

Second round
8	(France) Q Halys	4	4
(United States) M Krueger	6	6
(Australia) S Groth	5	6^{11}
3	(United States) T Smyczek	7	7^{13}
6	(United States) S Kozlov	5	4
Q	(United States) M Mmoh	7	6
(Belgium) J De Loore	2	5
2	(United States) B Fratangelo	6	7

Quarterfinals
(United States) M Krueger	2	4
3	(United States) T Smyczek	6	6
Q	(United States) M Mmoh	6	7
2	(United States) B Fratangelo	0	5

Semifinals
3	(United States) T Smyczek	6	3	6^{6}
Q	(United States) M Mmoh	2	6	7^{8}
