= 2014 Tiburon Challenger – Singles =

Singles
- 2014 Tiburon Challenger

Final
- Champion: (United States) Sam Querrey
- Runner-up: (Australia) John Millman
- Score: 6–4, 6–2

Events
Singles	Doubles
← 2013 ·	Tiburon Challenger	· 2015 →

Peter Polansky was the defending champion, but withdrew because of an elbow injury.

Sam Querrey won the title, defeating John Millman in the final, 6–4, 6–2.

== Seeds ==
1. (United States) Sam Querrey (champion)
2. (United States) Tim Smyczek (quarterfinals)
3. (United States) Bradley Klahn (second round)
4. (Canada) Peter Polansky (withdrew)
5. (United States) Denis Kudla (first round)
6. (Netherlands) Thiemo de Bakker (first round)
7. (Canada) Frank Dancevic (first round)
8. (Italy) Luca Vanni (first round)

== Draw ==
=== Key ===
- Q = Qualifier
- WC = Wild card
- LL = Lucky loser
- Alt = Alternate
- SE = Special exempt
- PR = Protected ranking
- ITF = ITF entry
- JE = Junior exempt
- w/o = Walkover
- r = Retired
- d = Defaulted
- SR = Special ranking

=== Finals ===
Semifinals
1	(United States) Sam Querrey	6	7
Q	(Australia) Matt Reid	1	5
Q	(Germany) Nils Langer	7	2	5
(Australia) John Millman	5	6	7

Final
1	(United States) Sam Querrey	6	6
(Australia) John Millman	4	2

=== Top half ===
First round
1	(United States) S Querrey	6	6
WC	(United States) D Nguyen	1	4
(United States) R Williams	6	1	6
(Sweden) E Ymer	4	6	1
(United Kingdom) K Edmund	6	3	3
(Republic of Ireland) J McGee	3	6	6
(Australia) J Thompson	5	6	6
5	(United States) D Kudla	7	3	4
LL	(South Africa) F Wolmarans	4	7^{7}	6
(United States) W Odesnik	6	6^{3}	2
WC	(United States) T Fawcett	5	5
Q	(Australia) M Reid	7	7
WC	(United States) B Fratangelo	6	6
(United States) A Kuznetsov	4	4
(Republic of Ireland) L Sorensen	6	5	7
8	(Italy) L Vanni	3	7	5

Second round
1	(United States) S Querrey	6	6
(United States) R Williams	3	2
(Republic of Ireland) J McGee	7^{7}	6
(Australia) J Thompson	6^{0}	3
LL	(South Africa) F Wolmarans	2	7	3
Q	(Australia) M Reid	6	5	6
WC	(United States) B Fratangelo	4	7	6
(Republic of Ireland) L Sorensen	6	5	4

Quarterfinals
1	(United States) S Querrey	6	7
(Republic of Ireland) J McGee	1	5
Q	(Australia) M Reid	6	7
WC	(United States) B Fratangelo	4	5

Semifinals
1	(United States) S Querrey	6	6
Q	(Australia) M Reid	3	4

=== Bottom half ===
First round
6	(Netherlands) T de Bakker	1	3
Q	(Germany) N Langer	6	6
(Australia) J-P Smith	6	6
Alt	(Italy) T Fabbiano	1	4
(Australia) A Bolt	0	3
Q	(United States) M Giron	6	6
PR	(United States) T Sandgren	4	6^{3}
3	(United States) B Klahn	6	7^{7}
7	(Canada) F Dancevic	3	6^{3}
LL	(United Kingdom) L Broady	6	7^{7}
(Australia) J Millman	6	6
(United States) C Buchanan	0	0
WC	(United States) J Donaldson	6	6
Q	(United States) D Novikov	3	2
(United States) R Harrison	3	3
2	(United States) T Smyczek	6	6

Second round
Q	(Germany) N Langer	7^{7}	7
(Australia) J-P Smith	6^{3}	5
Q	(United States) M Giron	7^{7}	7^{7}
3	(United States) B Klahn	6^{3}	6^{1}
LL	(United Kingdom) L Broady	1	2
(Australia) J Millman	6	6
WC	(United States) J Donaldson	6	6^{3}	5
2	(United States) T Smyczek	2	7^{7}	7

Quarterfinals
Q	(Germany) N Langer	6	1	7
Q	(United States) M Giron	4	6	5
(Australia) J Millman	6	5	6
2	(United States) T Smyczek	1	7	3

Semifinals
Q	(Germany) N Langer	7	2	5
(Australia) J Millman	5	6	7
