= 2015 Tiburon Challenger – Doubles =

Doubles
- 2015 Tiburon Challenger
- 2014 Champion: (United States) Bradley Klahn (Canada) Adil Shamasdin

Events
Singles	Doubles
- Tiburon Challenger

Bradley Klahn and Adil Shamasdin were the defending champions, but chose not to compete this year.

== Seeds ==
1. (Sweden) Johan Brunström / (Denmark) Frederik Nielsen
2. (South Africa) Dean O'Brien / (South Africa) Ruan Roelofse (first round)
3. (United States) Dennis Novikov / (Chile) Julio Peralta (semifinals)
4. (Australia) Carsten Ball / (Australia) Matt Reid

== Draw ==
Key

- Q = Qualifier
- WC = Wild card
- LL = Lucky loser
- Alt = Alternate
- ITF = ITF entry
- PR = Protected ranking
- SR = Special ranking
- SE = Special exempt
- JE = Junior exempt
- JR = Junior Accelerator Programme entrant
- CO = College Accelerator Programme entrant
- NG = Next Gen Accelerator Program entrant
- w/o = Walkover
- r = Retired
- d = Defaulted

First round
1	(Sweden) J Brunström (Denmark) F Nielsen	6	6
(Uruguay) A Behar (Philippines) R Gonzales	2	2
Q	(Switzerland) A Bossel (France) Q Halys	2	3
(United Kingdom) B Klein (New Zealand) J Statham	6	6
3	(United States) D Novikov (Chile) J Peralta	3	6	[11]
(United States) C Buchanan (Slovenia) B Rola	6	3	[9]
(Germany) D Brown (United States) D Kudla	3	7^{7}	[9]
WC	(Sweden) A Göransson (France) F Lakat	6	6^{2}	[11]
(United States) S Bangoura (Czech Republic) M Michalička	6	6
WC	(United States) Andre Dome (United States) Eric Johnson	4	4
(United States) T Sandgren (United States) T Smyczek	6^{6}	6	[15]
4	(Australia) C Ball (Australia) M Reid	7^{8}	3	[17]
(Canada) P Bester (Canada) P Polansky	6^{10}	6	[11]
(United States) M Krueger (United States) Connor Smith	7^{12}	2	[9]
WC	(United States) D Baughman (United States) M McDonald	4	6	[10]
2	(South Africa) D O'Brien (South Africa) R Roelofse	6	3	[4]

Quarterfinals
1	(Sweden) J Brunström (Denmark) F Nielsen	6	6^{1}	[10]
(United Kingdom) B Klein (New Zealand) J Statham	3	7^{7}	[5]
3	(United States) D Novikov (Chile) J Peralta	6	6
WC	(Sweden) A Göransson (France) F Lakat	2	2
(United States) S Bangoura (Czech Republic) M Michalicka	1	6^{3}
4	(Australia) C Ball (Australia) M Reid	6	7^{7}
(Canada) P Bester (Canada) P Polansky	4	1
WC	(United States) D Baughman (United States) M McDonald	6	6

Semifinals
1	(Sweden) J Brunström (Denmark) F Nielsen	4	7^{7}	[10]
3	(United States) D Novikov (Chile) J Peralta	6	6^{3}	[5]
4	(Australia) C Ball (Australia) M Reid	6	6
WC	(United States) D Baughman (United States) M McDonald	4	4

Final
1	(Sweden) J Brunström (Denmark) F Nielsen	7^{7}	6
4	(Australia) C Ball (Australia) M Reid	6^{2}	1
