= 2018 Tiburon Challenger – Singles =

Singles
- 2018 Tiburon Challenger

Final
- Champion: (United States) Michael Mmoh
- Runner-up: (Spain) Marcel Granollers
- Score: 6–3, 7–5

Events
Singles	Doubles
← 2017 ·	Tiburon Challenger	· 2019 →

Cameron Norrie was the defending champion but chose not to defend his title.

Michael Mmoh won the title after defeating Marcel Granollers 6–3, 7–5 in the final.

== Seeds ==
1. (Spain) Marcel Granollers (final)
2. (Australia) Jordan Thompson (first round)
3. (Canada) Peter Polansky (second round)
4. (Switzerland) Henri Laaksonen (first round)
5. (United States) Michael Mmoh (champion)
6. (United States) Noah Rubin (semifinals)
7. (Australia) Marc Polmans (first round)
8. (United States) Bjorn Fratangelo (second round)

== Draw ==
=== Key ===
- Q = Qualifier
- WC = Wild card
- LL = Lucky loser
- Alt = Alternate
- SE = Special exempt
- PR = Protected ranking
- ITF = ITF entry
- JE = Junior exempt
- w/o = Walkover
- r = Retired
- d = Defaulted
- SR = Special ranking

=== Finals ===
Semifinals
1	(Spain) Marcel Granollers	6	6
6	(United States) Noah Rubin	2	2
5	(United States) Michael Mmoh	6	3	6
Alt	(Australia) James Duckworth	3	6	3

Final
1	(Spain) Marcel Granollers	3	5
5	(United States) Michael Mmoh	6	7

=== Top half ===
First round
1	(Spain) M Granollers	6	7
(United States) E King	2	5
Q	(Turkey) C İlkel	4	6	6
(Austria) L Miedler	6	4	3
(Australia) J-P Smith	6	6
(Spain) P Martínez	4	2
(Serbia) P Krstin	0	3
8	(United States) B Fratangelo	6	6
3	(Canada) P Polansky	6	6
WC	(United States) T Fawcett	4	4
(United States) C Eubanks	7^{7}	7^{7}
(Ecuador) R Quiroz	6^{4}	6^{4}
(United Kingdom) J Clarke	2	6^{5}
WC	(United States) JC Aragone	6	7^{7}
(Netherlands) T de Bakker	0	0
6	(United States) N Rubin	6	6

Second round
1	(Spain) M Granollers	6	7
Q	(Turkey) C İlkel	2	5
(Australia) J-P Smith	1	6	6
8	(United States) B Fratangelo	6	4	2
3	(Canada) P Polansky	3	3
(United States) C Eubanks	6	6
WC	(United States) JC Aragone	6^{3}	4
6	(United States) N Rubin	7^{7}	6

Quarterfinals
1	(Spain) M Granollers	6	6
(Australia) J-P Smith	2	3
(United States) C Eubanks	4	3
6	(United States) N Rubin	6	6

Semifinals
1	(Spain) M Granollers	6	6
6	(United States) N Rubin	2	2

=== Bottom half ===
First round
5	(United States) M Mmoh	6	6
(Barbados) D King	2	4
(United States) E Escobedo	6	7^{7}
Q	(Spain) R Ortega Olmedo	1	6^{2}
WC	(United States) B Holt	6	7^{7}
Q	(Canada) S Diez	3	6^{4}
WC	(United States) T Paul	6	6
4	(Switzerland) H Laaksonen	4	3
7	(Australia) M Polmans	4	4
(Australia) A Popyrin	6	6
Q	(United States) A Sarkissian	6^{1}	4
Alt	(Australia) J Duckworth	7^{7}	6
SE	(Denmark) M Torpegaard	6	6
(Australia) M Banes	4	2
(El Salvador) M Arévalo	2	7^{7}	7^{7}
2	(Australia) J Thompson	6	6^{2}	6^{5}

Second round
5	(United States) M Mmoh	6	3
(United States) E Escobedo	2	0^{r}
WC	(United States) B Holt	0^{r}
WC	(United States) T Paul	5
(Australia) A Popyrin	6	6^{2}	6^{6}
Alt	(Australia) J Duckworth	4	7^{7}	7^{8}
SE	(Denmark) M Torpegaard	3	6	3
(El Salvador) M Arévalo	6	0	6

Quarterfinals
5	(United States) M Mmoh	7^{9}	2	6
WC	(United States) T Paul	6^{7}	6	3
Alt	(Australia) J Duckworth	7	6
(El Salvador) M Arévalo	5	3

Semifinals
5	(United States) M Mmoh	6	3	6
Alt	(Australia) J Duckworth	3	6	3
