= 2018 Tiburon Challenger =

- Date: 24–30 September
- Edition: 12th
- Draw: 32S / 16D
- Surface: Hard
- Location: Tiburon, United States

Champions

Singles
- (United States) Michael Mmoh

Doubles
- (Mexico) Hans Hach Verdugo / (Australia) Luke Saville
← 2017 ·	Tiburon Challenger	· 2019 →

The 2018 Wells Fargo Tiburon Challenger was a professional tennis tournament played on outdoor hard courts. It was the twelfth edition of the tournament which was part of the 2018 ATP Challenger Tour. It took place in Tiburon, United States between September 24 and September 30, 2018.

== Singles main draw entrants ==
=== Seeds ===
Country	Player	Rank^{1}	Seed
ESP	Marcel Granollers	102	1
AUS	Jordan Thompson	111	2
CAN	Peter Polansky	113	3
SUI	Henri Laaksonen	121	4
USA	Michael Mmoh	124	5
USA	Noah Rubin	138	6
AUS	Marc Polmans	163	7
USA	Bjorn Fratangelo	169	8

- ^{1} Rankings are as of September 17, 2018.

=== Other entrants ===
The following players received wildcards into the singles main draw:

- (United States) JC Aragone
- (United States) Tom Fawcett
- (United States) Brandon Holt
- (United States) Tommy Paul

The following player received entry into the singles main draw as a special exempt:

- (Denmark) Mikael Torpegaard

The following player received entry into the singles main draw as an alternate:

- (Australia) James Duckworth

The following players received entry from the qualifying draw:

- (Canada) Steven Diez
- (Turkey) Cem İlkel
- (Spain) Roberto Ortega Olmedo
- (United States) Alexander Sarkissian

== Champions ==
=== Singles ===
- (United States) Michael Mmoh def. (Spain) Marcel Granollers 6–3, 7–5.

=== Doubles ===
- (Mexico) Hans Hach Verdugo / (Australia) Luke Saville def. (Spain) Gerard Granollers / (Spain) Pedro Martínez 6–3, 6–2.
