= 2023 Tiburon Challenger – Doubles =

Doubles
- 2023 Tiburon Challenger

Final
- Champions: (United Kingdom) Luke Johnson (Tunisia) Skander Mansouri
- Runners-up: (United States) William Blumberg (Venezuela) Luis David Martínez
- Score: 6–2, 6–3

Events
Singles	Doubles
← 2022 ·	Tiburon Challenger	· 2024 →

Leandro Riedi and Valentin Vacherot were the defending champions but chose not to defend their title.

Luke Johnson and Skander Mansouri won the title after defeating William Blumberg and Luis David Martínez 6–2, 6–3 in the final.

== Seeds ==
1. (United States) William Blumberg / (Venezuela) Luis David Martínez (final)
2. (United Kingdom) Luke Johnson / (Tunisia) Skander Mansouri (champions)
3. (United States) Christian Harrison / (Latvia) Miķelis Lībietis (first round)
4. (Mexico) Hans Hach Verdugo / (New Zealand) Artem Sitak (first round)

== Draw ==
Key

- Q = Qualifier
- WC = Wild card
- LL = Lucky loser
- Alt = Alternate
- ITF = ITF entry
- PR = Protected ranking
- SR = Special ranking
- SE = Special exempt
- JE = Junior exempt
- JR = Junior Accelerator Programme entrant
- CO = College Accelerator Programme entrant
- NG = Next Gen Accelerator Program entrant
- w/o = Walkover
- r = Retired
- d = Defaulted

First round
1	(United States) W Blumberg (Venezuela) LD Martínez	6	6
(Argentina) FA Gómez (Canada) K Stevenson	2	3
(United States) V Kirkov (United States) D Kudla	6	3	[1]
(United States) A Lawson (Australia) C Puttergill	3	6	[10]
3	(United States) C Harrison (Latvia) M Lībietis	6^{13}	3
(United States) E King (United States) M Krueger	7^{15}	6
WC	(United States) Christian Langmo (United States) Luke Tusher	3	2
WC	(United States) P Kypson (United States) E Quinn	6	6
(Australia) T Schoolkate (Australia) A Walton	4	7	[4]
(United States) M Kiger (Canada) B Sigouin	6	5	[10]
(United States) G Goldhoff (United States) A Perez	7	7^{7}
4	(Mexico) H Hach Verdugo (New Zealand) A Sitak	5	6^{5}
(France) L Lokoli (Switzerland) A Ritschard	1	7	[7]
(Philippines) R Gonzales (United States) N Moreno de Alboran	6	5	[10]
(United Kingdom) J Monday (United Kingdom) M Whitehouse	1	3
2	(United Kingdom) L Johnson (Tunisia) S Mansouri	6	6

Quarterfinals
1	(United States) W Blumberg (Venezuela) LD Martínez	6	6
(United States) A Lawson (Australia) C Puttergill	4	4
(United States) E King (United States) M Krueger	6	6^{1}	[11]
WC	(United States) P Kypson (United States) E Quinn	4	7^{7}	[13]
(United States) M Kiger (Canada) B Sigouin	4	6^{3}
(United States) G Goldhoff (United States) A Perez	6	7^{7}
(Philippines) R Gonzales (United States) N Moreno de Alboran	5	3
2	(United Kingdom) L Johnson (Tunisia) S Mansouri	7	6

Semifinals
1	(United States) W Blumberg (Venezuela) LD Martínez	6	6
WC	(United States) P Kypson (United States) E Quinn	2	4
(United States) G Goldhoff (United States) A Perez	4	6	[7]
2	(United Kingdom) L Johnson (Tunisia) S Mansouri	6	3	[10]

Final
1	(United States) W Blumberg (Venezuela) LD Martínez	2	3
2	(United Kingdom) L Johnson (Tunisia) S Mansouri	6	6
