= 2017 Tiburon Challenger – Doubles =

Doubles
- 2017 Tiburon Challenger

Final
- Champions: (Sweden) André Göransson (France) Florian Lakat
- Runners-up: (El Salvador) Marcelo Arévalo (Mexico) Miguel Ángel Reyes-Varela
- Score: 6–4, 6–4

Events
Singles	Doubles
- Tiburon Challenger

Matt Reid and John-Patrick Smith were the defending champions but chose not to defend their title.

André Göransson and Florian Lakat won the title after defeating Marcelo Arévalo and Miguel Ángel Reyes-Varela 6–4, 6–4 in the final.

== Seeds ==
1. (El Salvador) Marcelo Arévalo / (Mexico) Miguel Ángel Reyes-Varela (final)
2. (United Kingdom) Luke Bambridge / (Republic of Ireland) David O'Hare (semifinals)
3. (United Kingdom) Brydan Klein / (United Kingdom) Joe Salisbury (quarterfinals)
4. (Latvia) Miķelis Lībietis / (Sweden) Andreas Siljeström (quarterfinals)

== Draw ==
Key

- Q = Qualifier
- WC = Wild card
- LL = Lucky loser
- Alt = Alternate
- ITF = ITF entry
- PR = Protected ranking
- SR = Special ranking
- SE = Special exempt
- JE = Junior exempt
- JR = Junior Accelerator Programme entrant
- CO = College Accelerator Programme entrant
- NG = Next Gen Accelerator Program entrant
- w/o = Walkover
- r = Retired
- d = Defaulted

First round
1	(El Salvador) M Arévalo (Mexico) MÁ Reyes-Varela	6^{4}	6	[11]
(Barbados) D King (United Kingdom) C Norrie	7^{7}	3	[9]
WC	(United States) D Baughman (United States) M Mmoh	6	6^{6}	[6]
PR	(Belgium) R Bemelmans (Canada) F Dancevic	0	7^{8}	[10]
3	(United Kingdom) B Klein (United Kingdom) J Salisbury	3	6	[10]
(United States) D Kudla (United States) M McDonald	6	1	[8]
PR	(Colombia) A González (Ecuador) R Quiroz	7	6
WC	(United States) John Lamble (Portugal) B Saraiva	5	4
(United States) S Bangoura (United States) E King	6	4	[12]
WC	(Sweden) A Göransson (France) F Lakat	2	6	[14]
(United States) M Krueger (South Africa) R Roelofse	1	6	[7]
4	(Latvia) M Lībietis (Sweden) A Siljeström	6	2	[10]
(Mexico) H Hach Verdugo (India) R Ramanathan	1	1
Q	(United States) T Fawcett (Israel) E Leshem	6	6
(United States) T Sandgren (United States) T Smyczek	3	6	[5]
2	(United Kingdom) L Bambridge (Republic of Ireland) D O'Hare	6	3	[10]

Quarterfinals
1	(El Salvador) M Arévalo (Mexico) MÁ Reyes-Varela	7^{7}	6
PR	(Belgium) R Bemelmans (Canada) F Dancevic	6^{5}	4
3	(United Kingdom) B Klein (United Kingdom) J Salisbury	3	6	[3]
PR	(Colombia) A González (Ecuador) R Quiroz	6	4	[10]
WC	(Sweden) A Göransson (France) F Lakat	6	6
4	(Latvia) M Lībietis (Sweden) A Siljeström	4	3
Q	(United States) T Fawcett (Israel) E Leshem	4	4
2	(United Kingdom) L Bambridge (Republic of Ireland) D O'Hare	6	6

Semifinals
1	(El Salvador) M Arévalo (Mexico) MÁ Reyes-Varela	6	6
PR	(Colombia) A González (Ecuador) R Quiroz	3	4
WC	(Sweden) A Göransson (France) F Lakat	6	7
2	(United Kingdom) L Bambridge (Republic of Ireland) D O'Hare	3	5

Final
1	(El Salvador) M Arévalo (Mexico) MÁ Reyes-Varela	4	4
WC	(Sweden) A Göransson (France) F Lakat	6	6
