= 2012 Tiburon Challenger – Singles =

Singles
- 2012 Tiburon Challenger

Final
- Champion: (United States) Jack Sock
- Runner-up: (Germany) Mischa Zverev
- Score: 6–1, 1–6, 7–6^{(7–3)}

Events
Singles	Doubles
← 2011 ·	Tiburon Challenger	· 2013 →

Ivo Karlović was the defending champion but decided not to participate.
Jack Sock won the final against Mischa Zverev 6–1, 1–6, 7–6^{(7–3)}.

== Seeds ==
1. (Germany) Benjamin Becker (second round, withdrew due to abductor pain)
2. (United States) James Blake (quarterfinals)
3. (United States) Ryan Sweeting (first round)
4. (United States) Wayne Odesnik (first round)
5. (Italy) Matteo Viola (first round)
6. (United States) Tim Smyczek (first round)
7. (United States) Denis Kudla (quarterfinals)
8. (United States) Bobby Reynolds (semifinals)

== Draw ==
=== Key ===
- Q = Qualifier
- WC = Wild card
- LL = Lucky loser
- Alt = Alternate
- SE = Special exempt
- PR = Protected ranking
- ITF = ITF entry
- JE = Junior exempt
- w/o = Walkover
- r = Retired
- d = Defaulted
- SR = Special ranking

=== Finals ===
Semifinals
(United States) Jack Sock	6	7^{7}
(United States) Steve Johnson	4	6^{4}
8	(United States) Bobby Reynolds	4	3
(Germany) Mischa Zverev	6	6

Final
(United States) Jack Sock	6	1	7^{7}
(Germany) Mischa Zverev	1	6	6^{3}

=== Top half ===
First round
1	(Germany) B Becker	7^{7}	2	6
Q	(United States) N Meister	6^{4}	6	1
Alt	(United States) T Sandgren	0	4
(United States) J Sock	6	6
(United States) M Yani	3	4
(United States) R Williams	6	6
(South Africa) I van der Merwe	6	6
5	(Italy) M Viola	3	4
3	(United States) R Sweeting	1	2
(Colombia) R Farah	6	6
(Ukraine) S Bubka	6^{4}	4
(United States) S Johnson	7^{7}	6
WC	(United States) D Nguyen	1	4
Q	(Australia) C Guccione	6	6
Q	(Denmark) F Nielsen	2	6^{5}
7	(United States) D Kudla	6	7^{7}

Second round
1	(Germany) B Becker
(United States) J Sock	w/o
(United States) R Williams	6	6
(South Africa) I van der Merwe	2	3
(Colombia) R Farah	3	3
(United States) S Johnson	6	6
Q	(Australia) C Guccione	4	7^{8}	6^{4}
7	(United States) D Kudla	6	6^{6}	7^{7}

Quarterfinals
(United States) J Sock	7^{7}	3	6
(United States) R Williams	6^{5}	6	1
(United States) S Johnson	6	6
7	(United States) D Kudla	1	2

Semifinals
(United States) J Sock	6	7^{7}
(United States) S Johnson	4	6^{4}

=== Bottom half ===
First round
8	(United States) B Reynolds	7	6
WC	(United States) C Harrison	5	0
(Australia) M Reid	7^{7}	6
(Australia) J Millman	6^{2}	4
WC	(United States) B Klahn	6	6
(Australia) S Groth	3	3
Q	(United States) J Dadamo	6	6
4	(United States) W Odesnik	4	3
6	(United States) T Smyczek	4	1
(South Africa) R de Voest	6	6
WC	(United States) M McClune	6	2	1
(Germany) M Zverev	3	6	6
(Moldova) R Borvanov	0	6	1
SE	(United States) D Kosakowski	6	3	6
(United States) A Kuznetsov	4	4
2	(United States) J Blake	6	6

Second round
8	(United States) B Reynolds	3	6	6
(Australia) M Reid	6	1	4
WC	(United States) B Klahn	6	4	7
Q	(United States) J Dadamo	4	6	5
(South Africa) R de Voest	2	3
(Germany) M Zverev	6	6
SE	(United States) D Kosakowski	2	3
2	(United States) J Blake	6	6

Quarterfinals
8	(United States) B Reynolds	6	2	7^{7}
WC	(United States) B Klahn	4	6	6^{4}
(Germany) M Zverev	6	6
2	(United States) J Blake	0	2

Semifinals
8	(United States) B Reynolds	4	3
(Germany) M Zverev	6	6
