= 2016 Tiburon Challenger =

- Date: 26 September – 2 October
- Edition: 10th
- Draw: 32S / 16D
- Prize money: $100,000
- Surface: Hard
- Location: Tiburon, United States

Champions

Singles
- (Barbados) Darian King

Doubles
- (Australia) Matt Reid / (Australia) John-Patrick Smith
← 2015 ·	Tiburon Challenger	· 2017 →

The 2016 Tiburon Challenger was a professional tennis tournament played on outdoor hard courts. It was the tenth edition of the tournament which was part of the 2016 ATP Challenger Tour. It took place in Tiburon, United States between September 26 and October 2, 2016.

== Singles main draw entrants ==
=== Seeds ===
Country	Player	Rank^{1}	Seed
GER	Benjamin Becker	97	1
USA	Bjorn Fratangelo	110	2
USA	Tim Smyczek	112	3
USA	Frances Tiafoe	122	4
USA	Dennis Novikov	133	5
USA	Stefan Kozlov	155	6
USA	Ernesto Escobedo	139	7
FRA	Quentin Halys	143	8

- ^{1} Rankings are as of September 19, 2016.

=== Other entrants ===
The following players received wildcards into the singles main draw:

- (United States) Brian Baker
- (United States) Robbie C. Bellamy
- (United States) Mackenzie McDonald
- (United States) Noah Rubin

The following players received entry into the singles main draw as special exempts:

- (United States) Tennys Sandgren
- (Australia) John-Patrick Smith

The following players received entry from the qualifying draw:

- (United States) Michael Mmoh
- (United Kingdom) Brydan Klein
- (United Kingdom) Lloyd Glasspool
- (Italy) Salvatore Caruso

== Champions ==
=== Singles ===
- (Barbados) Darian King def. (United States) Michael Mmoh, 7–6^{(7–2)}, 6–2.

=== Doubles ===
- (Australia) Matt Reid / (Australia) John-Patrick Smith def. (France) Quentin Halys / (United States) Dennis Novikov, 6–1, 6–2.
