= 2023 Tiburon Challenger – Singles =

Singles
- 2023 Tiburon Challenger

Final
- Champion: (United States) Zachary Svajda
- Runner-up: (Australia) Adam Walton
- Score: 6–2, 6–2

Events
Singles	Doubles
← 2022 ·	Tiburon Challenger	· 2024 →

Zachary Svajda was the defending champion and successfully defended his title after defeating Adam Walton 6–2, 6–2 in the final.

== Seeds ==
1. (United States) Alex Michelsen (second round)
2. (United States) Nicolas Moreno de Alboran (first round)
3. (United States) Zachary Svajda (champion)
4. (United States) Denis Kudla (first round)
5. (Canada) Alexis Galarneau (semifinals)
6. (Canada) Vasek Pospisil (first round)
7. (United Kingdom) Ryan Peniston (second round)
8. (United States) Tennys Sandgren (second round, retired)

== Draw ==
Key

- Q = Qualifier
- WC = Wild card
- LL = Lucky loser
- Alt = Alternate
- ITF = ITF entry
- PR = Protected ranking
- SR = Special ranking
- SE = Special exempt
- JE = Junior exempt
- JR = Junior Accelerator Programme entrant
- CO = College Accelerator Programme entrant
- NG = Next Gen Accelerator Program entrant
- w/o = Walkover
- r = Retired
- d = Defaulted

=== Finals ===
Semifinals
(Australia) Tristan Schoolkate	4	5
(Australia) Adam Walton	6	7
3	(United States) Zachary Svajda	6	6
5	(Canada) Alexis Galarneau	3	4

Final
(Australia) Adam Walton	2	2
3	(United States) Zachary Svajda	6	6

=== Top half ===
First round
1	(United States) A Michelsen	6^{2}	6	6
Q	(Canada) B Schnur	7^{7}	3	4
(France) G Mpetshi Perricard	6^{4}	3
Q	(United States) T-S Kwiatkowski	7^{7}	6
WC	(United States) O Baris	3	1
(Australia) T Schoolkate	6	6
(United States) M Krueger	6^{4}	2
7	(United Kingdom) R Peniston	7^{7}	6
4	(United States) D Kudla	1	6	6^{12}
(Australia) B Tomic	6	4	7^{14}
Q	(United States) A Perez	1	3
(Estonia) M Lajal	6	6
Q	(United States) G Johns	2	4
WC	(United States) L Tien	6	6
(Australia) A Walton	6	7^{7}
6	(Canada) V Pospisil	4	6^{5}

Second round
1	(United States) A Michelsen	6	4	3
Q	(United States) T-S Kwiatkowski	4	6	6
(Australia) T Schoolkate	6	6
7	(United Kingdom) R Peniston	3	4
(Australia) B Tomic	7^{7}	6
(Estonia) M Lajal	6^{1}	3
WC	(United States) L Tien	2	4
(Australia) A Walton	6	6

Quarterfinals
Q	(United States) T-S Kwiatkowski	6	4	2
(Australia) T Schoolkate	3	6	6
(Australia) B Tomic	4	4
(Australia) A Walton	6	6

Semifinals
(Australia) T Schoolkate	4	5
(Australia) A Walton	6	7

=== Bottom half ===
First round
8	(United States) T Sandgren	6	6
Q	(United States) C Kingsley	4	4
Q	(United States) N Basavareddy	6	4
(Jordan) A Shelbayh	0	2^{r}
WC	(United States) S Dostanic	6^{3}	6	2
(United States) S Johnson	7^{7}	3	6
PR	(United States) C Harrison	6^{6}	5
3	(United States) Z Svajda	7^{8}	7
5	(Canada) A Galarneau	7^{7}	6
(United States) P Kypson	6^{5}	4
(Tunisia) A Dougaz	7^{7}	6
(Croatia) M Poljičak	6^{3}	4
(France) L Lokoli	6^{3}	2
(United Kingdom) J Monday	7^{7}	6
(Switzerland) A Ritschard	6	7
2	(United States) N Moreno de Alboran	2	5

Second round
8	(United States) T Sandgren	2	1^{r}
Q	(United States) N Basavareddy	6	3
(United States) S Johnson	6	3	4
3	(United States) Z Svajda	3	6	6
5	(Canada) A Galarneau	7^{7}	1	7
(Tunisia) A Dougaz	6^{5}	6	5
(United Kingdom) J Monday	3	7^{7}	6^{2}
(Switzerland) A Ritschard	6	6^{5}	7^{7}

Quarterfinals
Q	(United States) N Basavareddy	0	2
3	(United States) Z Svajda	6	6
5	(Canada) A Galarneau	6	6^{6}	7
(Switzerland) A Ritschard	3	7^{8}	5

Semifinals
3	(United States) Z Svajda	6	6
5	(Canada) A Galarneau	3	4
