= 2013 Tiburon Challenger – Doubles =

Doubles
- 2013 Tiburon Challenger

Final
- Champions: (United States) Austin Krajicek (United States) Rhyne Williams
- Runners-up: (United States) Bradley Klahn (United States) Rajeev Ram
- Score: 6–4, 6–1

Events
Singles	Doubles
← 2012 ·	Tiburon Challenger	· 2014 →

Rik de Voest and Chris Guccione were the defending champions but de Voest decided not to participate.
Guccione played alongside Samuel Groth, but lost to eventual champions Austin Krajicek and Rhyne Williams, who defeated Bradley Klahn and Rajeev Ram 6–4, 6–1 in the final.

== Seeds ==
1. (Australia) Samuel Groth / (Australia) Chris Guccione (semifinals)
2. (United States) Bradley Klahn / (United States) Rajeev Ram (final)
3. (United States) Austin Krajicek / (United States) Rhyne Williams (champions)
4. (United States) Steve Johnson / (United States) Tim Smyczek (withdrawn)

== Draw ==
=== Key ===
- Q = Qualifier
- WC = Wild card
- LL = Lucky loser
- Alt = Alternate
- ITF = ITF entry
- PR = Protected ranking
- SR = Special ranking
- SE = Special exempt
- JE = Junior exempt
- JR = Junior Accelerator Programme entrant
- CO = College Accelerator Programme entrant
- NG = Next Gen Accelerator Program entrant
- w/o = Walkover
- r = Retired
- d = Defaulted

=== Draw ===
First round
1	(Australia) S Groth (Australia) C Guccione	6	6
WC	(United States) Erik Elliott (United States) M Seeberger	3	3
(El Salvador) M Arévalo (United States) D Zivkovic	6	4	[10]
(United States) J Jenkins (United States) D Young	4	6	[6]
3	(United States) A Krajicek (United States) R Williams	6	6
(Republic of Ireland) J McGee (United States) N Meister	4	3
WC	(Sweden) F Bergevi (New Zealand) B McLachlan	3	3
(Canada) P Bester (Canada) P Polansky	6	6
(Australia) C Ball (Ukraine) D Molchanov	6	6
WC	(United States) Connor Farren (United States) D Novikov	1	2
Q	(United States) Malcolm Harrison (United States) Campbell Johnson	6	6
ALT	(United States) Alan Chang (United States) Andy Chang	2	2
(Croatia) Marin Bradaric (Italy) S Caruso	1	3
(Ecuador) G Lapentti (Canada) F Peliwo	6	6
(Australia) B Mitchell (Australia) M Reid	6^{3}	6	[5]
2	(United States) B Klahn (United States) R Ram	7^{7}	1	[10]

Quarterfinals
1	(Australia) S Groth (Australia) C Guccione	6	6^{3}	[11]
(El Salvador) M Arévalo (United States) D Zivkovic	3	7^{7}	[9]
3	(United States) A Krajicek (United States) R Williams	7^{7}	6
(Canada) P Bester (Canada) P Polansky	6^{2}	1
(Australia) C Ball (Ukraine) D Molchanov	6	6
Q	(United States) M Harrison (United States) C Johnson	2	4
(Ecuador) G Lapentti (Canada) F Peliwo	1	4
2	(United States) B Klahn (United States) R Ram	6	6

Semifinals
1	(Australia) S Groth (Australia) C Guccione	4	6^{3}
3	(United States) A Krajicek (United States) R Williams	6	7^{7}
(Australia) C Ball (Ukraine) D Molchanov	2	3
2	(United States) B Klahn (United States) R Ram	6	6

Final
3	(United States) A Krajicek (United States) R Williams	6	6
2	(United States) B Klahn (United States) R Ram	4	1
