= 2010 Royal Bank of Scotland Challenger – Doubles =

Doubles
- 2010 Royal Bank of Scotland Challenger

Final
- Champions: (United States) Robert Kendrick (United States) Travis Rettenmaier
- Runners-up: (United States) Ryler DeHeart (Canada) Pierre-Ludovic Duclos
- Score: 6–1, 6–4

Events
Singles	Doubles
← 2009 ·	Royal Bank of Scotland Challenger	· 2011 →

Treat Conrad Huey and Harsh Mankad were the defending champions, but they didn't compete this year.
Robert Kendrick and Travis Rettenmaier won the final against Ryler DeHeart and Pierre-Ludovic Duclos 6–1, 6–4.

== Seeds ==
1. (Australia) Carsten Ball / (Australia) Chris Guccione (quarterfinals, withdrew)
2. (South Africa) Rik de Voest / (South Africa) Izak van der Merwe (first round)
3. (United States) Ryler DeHeart / (Canada) Pierre-Ludovic Duclos (final)
4. (United States) Robert Kendrick / (United States) Travis Rettenmaier (champions)

== Draw ==
=== Key ===
- Q = Qualifier
- WC = Wild card
- LL = Lucky loser
- Alt = Alternate
- SE = Special exempt
- PR = Protected ranking
- ITF = ITF entry
- JE = Junior exempt
- w/o = Walkover
- r = Retired
- d = Defaulted
- SR = Special ranking

=== Draw ===
First round
1	(Australia) C Ball (Australia) C Guccione	6	6
WC	(United States) B Klahn (United States) T Smyczek	3	3
(United Kingdom) J Baker (United States) K Kim	7	6
WC	(United States) B Joelson (United States) N Monroe	6^{5}	4
3	(United States) R DeHeart (Canada) P-L Duclos	6	6
Q	(Canada) C Klingemann (United States) P Simmonds	4	4
(New Zealand) D King-Turner (Denmark) F Nielsen	6	0	[8]
(United States) J Witten (United States) D Young	2	6	[10]
(United States) A Kumar (Russia) A Sitak	6	3	[11]
WC	(United States) R Sarmiento (United States) JT Sundling	4	6	[9]
(United States) JP Fruttero (Australia) M Matosevic	5	6^{5}
4	(United States) R Kendrick (United States) T Rettenmaier	7	7
(United States) L Cook (Bosnia and Herzegovina) A Delić	5	5
(United States) A Bogomolov Jr. (United States) A Kuznetsov	7	7
(United States) R Harrison (United States) T Parrott	7	6
2	(South Africa) R de Voest (South Africa) I van der Merwe	6^{5}	4

Quarterfinals
1	(Australia) C Ball (Australia) C Guccione	w/o
(United Kingdom) J Baker (United States) K Kim
3	(United States) R DeHeart (Canada) P-L Duclos	6	6
(United States) J Witten (United States) D Young	4	4
(United States) A Kumar (Russia) A Sitak	6	1	[7]
4	(United States) R Kendrick (United States) T Rettenmaier	4	6	[10]
(United States) A Bogomolov Jr. (United States) A Kuznetsov	7	6
(United States) R Harrison (United States) T Parrott	5	4

Semifinals
(United Kingdom) J Baker (United States) K Kim	4	4
3	(United States) R DeHeart (Canada) P-L Duclos	6	6
4	(United States) R Kendrick (United States) T Rettenmaier	6	2	[10]
(United States) A Bogomolov Jr. (United States) A Kuznetsov	2	6	[8]

Finals
3	(United States) R DeHeart (Canada) P-L Duclos	1	4
4	(United States) R Kendrick (United States) T Rettenmaier	6	6
