= 2018 Tiburon Challenger – Doubles =

Doubles
- 2018 Tiburon Challenger

Final
- Champions: (Mexico) Hans Hach Verdugo (Australia) Luke Saville
- Runners-up: (Spain) Gerard Granollers (Spain) Pedro Martínez
- Score: 6–3, 6–2

Events
Singles	Doubles
- Tiburon Challenger

André Göransson and Florian Lakat were the defending champions but lost in the quarterfinals to Gerard Granollers and Pedro Martínez.

Hans Hach Verdugo and Luke Saville won the title after defeating Granollers and Martínez 6–3, 6–2 in the final.

== Seeds ==
1. (El Salvador) Marcelo Arévalo / (Venezuela) Roberto Maytín (quarterfinals)
2. (Thailand) Sanchai Ratiwatana / (Indonesia) Christopher Rungkat (first round)
3. (Canada) Peter Polansky / (United States) Jackson Withrow (first round)
4. (Spain) Marcel Granollers / (Netherlands) Mark Vervoort (quarterfinals)

== Draw ==
Key

- Q = Qualifier
- WC = Wild card
- LL = Lucky loser
- Alt = Alternate
- ITF = ITF entry
- PR = Protected ranking
- SR = Special ranking
- SE = Special exempt
- JE = Junior exempt
- JR = Junior Accelerator Programme entrant
- CO = College Accelerator Programme entrant
- NG = Next Gen Accelerator Program entrant
- w/o = Walkover
- r = Retired
- d = Defaulted

First round
1	(El Salvador) M Arévalo (Venezuela) R Maytín	6	6
(United States) B Fratangelo (United States) R Galloway	3	0
(South Africa) R Roelofse (United States) N Rubin	3	0
Q	(Mexico) H Hach Verdugo (Australia) L Saville	6	6
4	(Spain) M Granollers (Netherlands) M Vervoort	4	6	[10]
(Japan) T Matsui (Denmark) F Nielsen	6	3	[4]
(United States) A Lawson (United States) H Reese	6	6
(Australia) M Reid (Australia) J Thompson	4	4
(Spain) G Granollers (Spain) P Martínez	6	6
WC	(United States) C Eubanks (United States) M Krueger	4	4
WC	(Sweden) A Göransson (France) F Lakat	4	6	[10]
3	(Canada) P Polansky (United States) J Withrow	6	3	[4]
(Philippines) R Gonzales (United States) N Lammons	4	6	[4]
(United States) E King (United States) N Pasha	6	2	[10]
WC	(United States) H Johnson (United States) Y Johnson	6	3	[10]
2	(Thailand) Sa Ratiwatana (Indonesia) C Rungkat	1	6	[8]

Quarterfinals
1	(El Salvador) M Arévalo (Venezuela) R Maytín	6	6^{3}	[6]
Q	(Mexico) H Hach Verdugo (Australia) L Saville	2	7^{7}	[10]
4	(Spain) M Granollers (Netherlands) M Vervoort	6	6^{10}	[8]
(United States) A Lawson (United States) H Reese	4	7^{12}	[10]
(Spain) G Granollers (Spain) P Martínez	6	6
WC	(Sweden) A Göransson (France) F Lakat	4	4
(United States) E King (United States) N Pasha	6	6
WC	(United States) H Johnson (United States) Y Johnson	4	2

Semifinals
Q	(Mexico) H Hach Verdugo (Australia) L Saville	6	6
(United States) A Lawson (United States) H Reese	4	4
(Spain) G Granollers (Spain) P Martínez	7^{7}	7
(United States) E King (United States) N Pasha	6^{4}	5

Final
Q	(Mexico) H Hach Verdugo (Australia) L Saville	6	6
(Spain) G Granollers (Spain) P Martínez	3	2
