= 2026 Tiburon Challenger – Singles =

Singles
- 2026 Tiburon Challenger

Final
- Champion: (United States) Darwin Blanch
- Runner-up: (United States) Michael Mmoh
- Score: 3–6, 6–4, 6–2

Events
Singles	Doubles
- Tiburon Challenger

Michael Zheng was the defending champion but lost in the semifinals to Darwin Blanch.

Blanch won the title after defeating Michael Mmoh 3–6, 6–4, 6–2 in the final. Blanch became the youngest winner in the history of the tournament.

== Seeds ==
1. (United States) Michael Zheng (semifinals)
2. (United States) Nishesh Basavareddy (second round)
3. (Argentina) Federico Agustín Gómez (second round)
4. (United States) Michael Mmoh (final)
5. (United States) Tristan Boyer (second round)
6. (United States) Andre Ilagan (first round)
7. (United States) Keegan Smith (first round)
8. (United States) Braden Shick (second round)

== Draw ==
Key

- Q = Qualifier
- WC = Wild card
- LL = Lucky loser
- Alt = Alternate
- ITF = ITF entry
- PR = Protected ranking
- SR = Special ranking
- SE = Special exempt
- JE = Junior exempt
- JR = Junior Accelerator Programme entrant
- CO = College Accelerator Programme entrant
- NG = Next Gen Accelerator Program entrant
- w/o = Walkover
- r = Retired
- d = Defaulted

=== Finals ===
Semifinals
1	(United States) Michael Zheng	6^{5}	6^{9}
(United States) Darwin Blanch	7^{7}	7^{11}
4	(United States) Michael Mmoh	6	6
WC	(United States) J. J. Wolf	2	2

Final
(United States) Darwin Blanch	3	6	6
4	(United States) Michael Mmoh	6	4	2

=== Top half ===
First round
1	(United States) M Zheng	6	4	7
Q	(United States) E Zhu	1	6	5
(Jamaica) B Bicknell	6	5	5
Alt	(United States) T Svajda	4	7	7
WC	(United States) A Mayo	6	4	4
Q	(United States) R Seggerman	1	6	6
(United States) M Krueger	7^{7}	6^{2}	6
7	(United States) K Smith	6^{1}	7^{7}	4
3	(Argentina) FA Gómez	4	7^{7}	6
(United States) D Milavsky	6	6^{2}	2
(United States) Dar Blanch	6	2	7^{12}
(United States) S Kozlov	3	6	6^{10}
Q	(France) T Legout	6	6
(United Kingdom) H Searle	1	4
Q	(United States) Bry Nakashima	7	6^{4}	7^{7}
6	(United States) Andre Ilagan	5	7^{7}	6^{3}

Second round
1	(United States) M Zheng	6	6
Alt	(United States) T Svajda	1	4
Q	(United States) R Seggerman	6	1	6^{3}
(United States) M Krueger	4	6	7^{7}
3	(Argentina) FA Gómez	3	0
(United States) Dar Blanch	6	6
Q	(France) T Legout	6^{6}	2
Q	(United States) Bry Nakashima	7^{8}	6

Quarterfinals
1	(United States) M Zheng	7^{7}	6
(United States) M Krueger	6^{4}	2
(United States) Dar Blanch	6	6
Q	(United States) Bry Nakashima	3	3

Semifinals
1	(United States) M Zheng	6^{5}	6^{9}
(United States) Dar Blanch	7^{7}	7^{11}

=== Bottom half ===
First round
5	(United States) T Boyer	6	6
(Australia) E Winter	2	4
(Jordan) A Shelbayh	6	3	6
(United States) T Zink	4	6	3
(United Kingdom) A Gray	3	7	6^{3}
PR	(United States) Patrick Maloney	6	5	7^{7}
PR	(Brazil) K Sell	3	2
4	(United States) M Mmoh	6	6
8	(United States) B Shick	6	6
Q	E Arutiunian	3	4
WC	(United States) JJ Wolf	6	6
(Argentina) LE Ambrogi	2	0
Q	(Switzerland) Luca Stäheli	5	2
WC	(United States) S Gorzny	7	6
(Brazil) I Marcondes	2	2
2	(United States) N Basavareddy	6	6

Second round
5	(United States) T Boyer	6^{2}	1
(Jordan) A Shelbayh	7^{7}	6
PR	(United States) P Maloney	5	3
4	(United States) M Mmoh	7	6
8	(United States) B Shick	4	7^{7}	4
WC	(United States) JJ Wolf	6	6^{5}	6
WC	(United States) S Gorzny	6	6
2	(United States) N Basavareddy	2	4

Quarterfinals
(Jordan) A Shelbayh	4	4
4	(United States) M Mmoh	6	6
WC	(United States) JJ Wolf	7^{7}	1	7
WC	(United States) S Gorzny	6^{5}	6	5

Semifinals
4	(United States) M Mmoh	6	6
WC	(United States) JJ Wolf	2	2
