= 2019 Tiburon Challenger – Doubles =

Doubles
- 2019 Tiburon Challenger

Final
- Champions: (United States) Robert Galloway (Venezuela) Roberto Maytín
- Runners-up: (United States) JC Aragone (Barbados) Darian King
- Score: 6–2, 7–5

Events
Singles	Doubles
- Tiburon Challenger

Hans Hach Verdugo and Luke Saville were the defending champions but only Hach Verdugo chose to defend his title, partnering Dennis Novikov. Hach Verdugo lost in the first round to Alex Lawson and Jackson Withrow.

Robert Galloway and Roberto Maytín won the title after defeating JC Aragone and Darian King 6–2, 7–5 in the final.

== Seeds ==
1. (El Salvador) Marcelo Arévalo / (United States) Hunter Reese (quarterfinals)
2. (United States) Alex Lawson / (United States) Jackson Withrow (semifinals, defaulted)
3. (United States) Robert Galloway / (Venezuela) Roberto Maytín (champions)
4. (Sweden) André Göransson / (Netherlands) Sem Verbeek (first round)

== Draw ==
Key

- Q = Qualifier
- WC = Wild card
- LL = Lucky loser
- Alt = Alternate
- ITF = ITF entry
- PR = Protected ranking
- SR = Special ranking
- SE = Special exempt
- JE = Junior exempt
- JR = Junior Accelerator Programme entrant
- CO = College Accelerator Programme entrant
- NG = Next Gen Accelerator Program entrant
- w/o = Walkover
- r = Retired
- d = Defaulted

First round
1	(El Salvador) M Arévalo (United States) H Reese	6	6
WC	(United States) S Bangoura (United States) E King	3	4
WC	(United States) U Blanch (United States) Mi Redlicki	3	6^{2}
(United States) JC Aragone (Barbados) D King	6	7^{7}
4	(Sweden) A Göransson (Netherlands) S Verbeek	3	7^{7}	[7]
PR	(United States) N Pasha (United States) M Schnur	6	6^{0}	[10]
(United States) T Paul (Canada) P Polansky	0	1
(United States) J Cerretani (United States) M Cressy	6	6
(United States) JP Fruttero (United States) D Kudla	3	6	[10]
WC	(United States) H Johnson (United States) Y Johnson	6	4	[7]
PR	(Colombia) N Barrientos (Colombia) DE Galán	3	4
3	(United States) R Galloway (Venezuela) R Maytín	6	6
(Ecuador) G Escobar (Ecuador) R Quiroz	7^{9}	4	[2]
(United States) C Eubanks (United States) M Krueger	6^{7}	6	[10]
(Mexico) H Hach Verdugo (United States) D Novikov	6	3	[10]
2	(United States) A Lawson (United States) J Withrow	3	6	[12]

Quarterfinals
1	(El Salvador) M Arévalo (United States) H Reese	3	7	[9]
(United States) JC Aragone (Barbados) D King	6	5	[11]
PR	(United States) N Pasha (United States) M Schnur	6	6
(United States) J Cerretani (United States) M Cressy	3	4
(United States) JP Fruttero (United States) D Kudla	7	3	[6]
3	(United States) R Galloway (Venezuela) R Maytín	5	6	[10]
(United States) C Eubanks (United States) M Krueger	4	6^{5}
2	(United States) A Lawson (United States) J Withrow	6	7^{7}

Semifinals
(United States) JC Aragone (Barbados) D King	2	7	[10]
PR	(United States) N Pasha (United States) M Schnur	6	5	[6]
3	(United States) R Galloway (Venezuela) R Maytín	4	6	[3]
2	(United States) A Lawson (United States) J Withrow	6	3	[1]^{d}

Final
(United States) JC Aragone (Barbados) D King	2	5
3	(United States) R Galloway (Venezuela) R Maytín	6	7
