= 2025 Tiburon Challenger – Singles =

Singles
- 2025 Tiburon Challenger

Final
- Champion: (United States) Michael Zheng
- Runner-up: (United States) Tyler Zink
- Score: 6–4, 6–4

Events
Singles	Doubles
- Tiburon Challenger

Nishesh Basavareddy was the defending champion but chose not to defend his title.

Michael Zheng won the title after defeating Tyler Zink 6–4, 6–4 in the final.

== Seeds ==
1. (Austria) Jurij Rodionov (first round)
2. (United States) Murphy Cassone (second round)
3. (United Kingdom) Jack Pinnington Jones (second round)
4. (Lebanon) Benjamin Hassan (second round)
5. (Colombia) Nicolás Mejía (quarterfinals)
6. (Kazakhstan) Dmitry Popko (quarterfinals)
7. (United States) Michael Zheng (champion)
8. (United Kingdom) Johannus Monday (second round)

== Draw ==
Key

- Q = Qualifier
- WC = Wild card
- LL = Lucky loser
- Alt = Alternate
- ITF = ITF entry
- PR = Protected ranking
- SR = Special ranking
- SE = Special exempt
- JE = Junior exempt
- JR = Junior Accelerator Programme entrant
- CO = College Accelerator Programme entrant
- NG = Next Gen Accelerator Program entrant
- w/o = Walkover
- r = Retired
- d = Defaulted

=== Finals ===
Semifinals
SE	(Jordan) Abdullah Shelbayh	3	4
(United States) Tyler Zink	6	6
(Spain) Rafael Jódar	4	5
7	(United States) Michael Zheng	6	7

Final
(United States) Tyler Zink	4	4
7	(United States) Michael Zheng	6	6

=== Top half ===
First round
1	(Austria) J Rodionov	6^{3}	4
SE	(Jordan) A Shelbayh	7^{7}	6
(United States) A Perez	6	6
WC	(United States) T Svajda	4	4
Q	(Slovenia) B Artnak	6	6^{7}	6
Q	(Japan) Renta Tokuda	1	7^{9}	4
NG	(Italy) F Bondioli	2	7	2
6	(Kazakhstan) D Popko	6	5	6
4	(Lebanon) B Hassan	7	6
(United States) G Johns	5	3
PR	(Australia) P Sekulic	1	7	4
WC	(United States) S Banerjee	6	5	6
(United States) T Zink	6	6
Q	(United States) Micah Braswell	1	4
(United States) A Rybakov	3	6	2
8	(United Kingdom) J Monday	6	4	6

Second round
SE	(Jordan) A Shelbayh	4	6	6
(United States) A Perez	6	3	2
Q	(Slovenia) B Artnak	2	4
6	(Kazakhstan) D Popko	6	6
4	(Lebanon) B Hassan	1	5
WC	(United States) S Banerjee	6	7
(United States) T Zink	6	6
8	(United Kingdom) J Monday	4	3

Quarterfinals
SE	(Jordan) A Shelbayh	6	6
6	(Kazakhstan) D Popko	4	2
WC	(United States) S Banerjee	4	6	3
(United States) T Zink	6	1	6

Semifinals
SE	(Jordan) A Shelbayh	3	4
(United States) T Zink	6	6

=== Bottom half ===
First round
5	(Colombia) N Mejía	6	4	7^{7}
(United States) A Martin	4	6	6^{5}
(Germany) M Rosenkranz	7^{7}	6
(Czech Republic) M Gengel	6^{4}	2
(Spain) R Jódar	6	3	6
Q	(United States) Andre Ilagan	3	6	1
WC	(Canada) D Chan	3	3
3	(United Kingdom) J Pinnington Jones	6	6
7	(United States) M Zheng	6	6
Alt	(United Kingdom) O Tarvet	4	3
Q	(Sweden) O Wallin	2	7^{7}	6
(United States) M Damm	6	6^{5}	3
Q	(Germany) D Masur	6	4	2
(United States) M Krueger	2	6	6
(Australia) M Bouzige	3	2
2	(United States) M Cassone	6	6

Second round
5	(Colombia) N Mejía	2	6	7^{7}
(Germany) M Rosenkranz	6	4	6^{5}
(Spain) R Jódar	6	6
3	(United Kingdom) J Pinnington Jones	2	3
7	(United States) M Zheng	6	6
Q	(Sweden) O Wallin	4	1
(United States) M Krueger	6	6^{3}	6
2	(United States) M Cassone	3	7^{7}	2

Quarterfinals
5	(Colombia) N Mejía	0	2
(Spain) R Jódar	6	6
7	(United States) M Zheng	7	6
(United States) M Krueger	5	3

Semifinals
(Spain) R Jódar	4	5
7	(United States) M Zheng	6	7
