= 2016 Tiburon Challenger – Doubles =

Doubles
- 2016 Tiburon Challenger

Final
- Champions: (Australia) Matt Reid (Australia) John-Patrick Smith
- Runners-up: (France) Quentin Halys (United States) Dennis Novikov
- Score: 6–1, 6–2

Events
Singles	Doubles
- Tiburon Challenger

Johan Brunström and Frederik Nielsen were the defending champions but only Nielsen chose to defend his title, partnering Noah Rubin. They lost in the first round to Blaž Rola and Grega Žemlja.

Matt Reid and John-Patrick Smith won the title, defeating Quentin Halys and Dennis Novikov 6–1, 6–2 in the final.

== Seeds ==
1. (El Salvador) Marcelo Arévalo / (Chile) Julio Peralta (semifinals)
2. (Mexico) Miguel Ángel Reyes-Varela / (United States) Max Schnur (first round)
3. (Australia) Matt Reid / (Australia) John-Patrick Smith (champions)
4. (Canada) Philip Bester / (Canada) Peter Polansky (first round)

== Draw ==
Key

- Q = Qualifier
- WC = Wild card
- LL = Lucky loser
- Alt = Alternate
- ITF = ITF entry
- PR = Protected ranking
- SR = Special ranking
- SE = Special exempt
- JE = Junior exempt
- JR = Junior Accelerator Programme entrant
- CO = College Accelerator Programme entrant
- NG = Next Gen Accelerator Program entrant
- w/o = Walkover
- r = Retired
- d = Defaulted

First round
1	(El Salvador) M Arévalo (Chile) J Peralta	6	6
WC	(United States) T Paul (Canada) D Shapovalov	2	2
Q	(Slovenia) B Rola (Slovenia) G Žemlja	7^{12}	5	[10]
(Denmark) F Nielsen (United States) N Rubin	6^{10}	7	[7]
3	(Australia) M Reid (Australia) J-P Smith	4	7^{7}	[10]
(United States) S Kozlov (United States) A Krajicek	6	6^{4}	[5]
(Australia) S de Waard (Italy) A Giannessi	6	6
(Brazil) G Clezar (United Kingdom) B Klein	3	4
(United States) B Fratangelo (United States) T Smyczek	6	0	[11]
WC	(United States) S Bangoura (United States) M Krueger	3	6	[13]
(Barbados) D King (United States) F Tiafoe	7^{7}	6^{18}	[10]
4	(Canada) P Bester (Canada) P Polansky	6^{2}	7^{20}	[8]
WC	(United States) M McDonald (New Zealand) B McLachlan	6	4	[10]
PR	(India) Y Bhambri (United States) JP Fruttero	3	6	[3]
(France) Q Halys (United States) D Novikov	4	6	[10]
2	(Mexico) MÁ Reyes-Varela (United States) M Schnur	6	3	[5]

Quarterfinals
1	(El Salvador) M Arévalo (Chile) J Peralta	6	7^{7}
Q	(Slovenia) B Rola (Slovenia) G Žemlja	4	6^{4}
3	(Australia) M Reid (Australia) J-P Smith	6	6
(Australia) S de Waard (Italy) A Giannessi	0	2
WC	(United States) S Bangoura (United States) M Krueger	6	6
(Barbados) D King (United States) F Tiafoe	2	3
WC	(United States) M McDonald (New Zealand) B McLachlan	6	2	[4]
(France) Q Halys (United States) D Novikov	3	6	[10]

Semifinals
1	(El Salvador) M Arévalo (Chile) J Peralta	3	6	[4]
3	(Australia) M Reid (Australia) J-P Smith	6	3	[10]
WC	(United States) S Bangoura (United States) M Krueger	7^{7}	2	[4]
(France) Q Halys (United States) D Novikov	6^{5}	6	[10]

Final
3	(Australia) M Reid (Australia) J-P Smith	6	6
(France) Q Halys (United States) D Novikov	1	2
