= 2010 Royal Bank of Scotland Challenger – Singles =

Singles
- 2010 Royal Bank of Scotland Challenger

Final
- Champion: (Germany) Tobias Kamke
- Runner-up: (United States) Ryan Harrison
- Score: 6–1, 6–1

Events
Singles	Doubles
← 2009 ·	Royal Bank of Scotland Challenger	· 2011 →

Go Soeda was the defending champion, but chose not to compete this year.
Tobias Kamke won the title, defeating Ryan Harrison 6–1, 6–1 in the final.

== Seeds ==
1. (Germany) Tobias Kamke (champion)
2. (United States) Donald Young (second round)
3. (Germany) Julian Reister (second round)
4. (United States) Ryan Sweeting (first round)
5. (United States) ~~Robert Kendrick~~ (withdrew due to tiredness)
6. (Australia) Carsten Ball (semifinals)
7. (South Africa) Izak van der Merwe (first round)
8. (Australia) Marinko Matosevic (semifinals)

== Draw ==
=== Key ===
- Q = Qualifier
- WC = Wild card
- LL = Lucky loser
- Alt = Alternate
- SE = Special exempt
- PR = Protected ranking
- ITF = ITF entry
- JE = Junior exempt
- w/o = Walkover
- r = Retired
- d = Defaulted
- SR = Special ranking

=== Finals ===
Semifinals
1	(Germany) Tobias Kamke	4	6	7
8	(Australia) Marinko Matosevic	6	2	5
6	(Australia) Carsten Ball	3	0
(United States) Ryan Harrison	6	6

Final
1	(Germany) Tobias Kamke	6	6
(United States) Ryan Harrison	1	1

=== Top half ===
First round
1	(Germany) T Kamke	6	6
(Australia) G Jones	2	2
PR	(Australia) C Guccione	4	r
WC	(United States) D Kosakowski	5
(South Africa) R de Voest	2	6	4
(United States) T Smyczek	6	4	6
(United States) B Reynolds	3	6	6
7	(South Africa) I van der Merwe	6	1	3
4	(United States) R Sweeting	6	2	2
Q	(Denmark) F Nielsen	2	6	6
Q	(United Kingdom) J Baker	6	4	5
(United States) A Kuznetsov	3	6	7
ALT	(United States) R DeHeart	3	6	6
Q	(Canada) P-L Duclos	6	4	3
(Bosnia and Herzegovina) A Delić	7	2	3
8	(Australia) M Matosevic	6^{5}	6	6

Second round
1	(Germany) T Kamke	6	6
WC	(United States) D Kosakowski	2	3
(United States) T Smyczek	7	6
(United States) B Reynolds	5	4
Q	(Denmark) F Nielsen	6	5	3
(United States) A Kuznetsov	4	7	6
ALT	(United States) R DeHeart	3	2
8	(Australia) M Matosevic	6	6

Quarterfinals
1	(Germany) T Kamke	6	7
(United States) T Smyczek	4	6^{5}
(United States) A Kuznetsov	4	4
8	(Australia) M Matosevic	6	6

Semifinals
1	(Germany) T Kamke	4	6	7
8	(Australia) M Matosevic	6	2	5

=== Bottom half ===
First round
6	(Australia) C Ball	6	6
(New Zealand) D King-Turner	3	1
SE	(Ecuador) G Lapentti	6	6
WC	(United States) R Sarmiento	4	1
(United States) K Kim	6	6
(United States) M Yani	4	3
(Australia) J Millman	4	4
3	(Germany) J Reister	6	6
LL	(United States) J Witten	6	6
WC	(United States) B Klahn	2	1
WC	(United States) B Strode	2	6	3
(United States) A Bogomolov Jr.	6	2	6
(United States) R Harrison	6^{8}	6	6
(United States) L Cook	7	0	3
Q	(Belarus) K Harbatsiuk	1	0
2	(United States) D Young	6	6

Second round
6	(Australia) C Ball	3	6	6
SE	(Ecuador) G Lapentti	6	3	3
(United States) K Kim	6	6
3	(Germany) J Reister	3	2
LL	(United States) J Witten	1	0
(United States) A Bogomolov Jr.	6	6
(United States) R Harrison	6	6
2	(United States) D Young	4	3

Quarterfinals
6	(Australia) C Ball	6	6
(United States) K Kim	3	4
(United States) A Bogomolov Jr.	4	6	4
(United States) R Harrison	6	3	6

Semifinals
6	(Australia) C Ball	3	0
(United States) R Harrison	6	6
