= 2014 Tiburon Challenger – Doubles =

Doubles
- 2014 Tiburon Challenger

Final
- Champions: (United States) Bradley Klahn (Canada) Adil Shamasdin
- Runners-up: (Australia) Carsten Ball (Australia) Matt Reid
- Score: 7–5, 6–2

Events
Singles	Doubles
- Tiburon Challenger

Austin Krajicek and Rhyne Williams were the defending champions, but they did not compete.

Bradley Klahn and Adil Shamasdin won the title by defeating Carsten Ball and Matt Reid 7–5, 6–2 in the final.

== Seeds ==
1. (New Zealand) Marcus Daniell / (New Zealand) Artem Sitak (semifinals)
2. (United States) Bradley Klahn / (Canada) Adil Shamasdin (champions)
3. (Republic of Ireland) James Cluskey / (Denmark) Frederik Nielsen (quarterfinals)
4. (United States) Sekou Bangoura / (United States) Vahid Mirzadeh (quarterfinals)

== Draw ==
Key

- Q = Qualifier
- WC = Wild card
- LL = Lucky loser
- Alt = Alternate
- ITF = ITF entry
- PR = Protected ranking
- SR = Special ranking
- SE = Special exempt
- JE = Junior exempt
- JR = Junior Accelerator Programme entrant
- CO = College Accelerator Programme entrant
- NG = Next Gen Accelerator Program entrant
- w/o = Walkover
- r = Retired
- d = Defaulted

=== Draw ===
First round
1	(New Zealand) M Daniell (New Zealand) A Sitak	6	6
LL	(United States) Alan Chang (United States) Andy Chang	2	0
(Australia) A Bolt (United States) F Dancevic	4	2
(Italy) T Fabbiano (Italy) L Vanni	6	6
4	(United States) S Bangoura (United States) V Mirzadeh	5	6	[10]
Q	(Austria) S Bader (United States) Erik Elliott	7	4	[8]
(Netherlands) T de Bakker (Netherlands) W Koolhof	3	6^{4}
(Australia) C Ball (Australia) M Reid	6	7^{7}
(Germany) N Langer (Republic of Ireland) L Sorensen	1^{r}
(United States) C Buchanan (United States) T Sandgren	5
PR	(Australia) A Hubble (Australia) J-P Smith	6	3	[5]
3	(Republic of Ireland) J Cluskey (Denmark) F Nielsen	2	6	[10]
WC	(Chile) J Peralta (United States) M Seeberger	6	6
WC	(United States) C Altamirano (United States) D Baughman	4	1
WC	(United States) D Novikov (United States) G Ouellette	6	1	[5]
2	(United States) B Klahn (Canada) A Shamasdin	4	6	[10]

Quarterfinals
1	(New Zealand) M Daniell (New Zealand) A Sitak	6	7
(Italy) T Fabbiano (Italy) L Vanni	4	5
4	(United States) S Bangoura (United States) V Mirzadeh	3	3
(Australia) C Ball (Australia) M Reid	6	6
(United States) C Buchanan (United States) T Sandgren	5	6	[10]
3	(Republic of Ireland) J Cluskey (Denmark) F Nielsen	7	4	[4]
WC	(Chile) J Peralta (United States) M Seeberger	5	3
2	(United States) B Klahn (Canada) A Shamasdin	7	6

Semifinals
1	(New Zealand) M Daniell (New Zealand) A Sitak	3	6	[6]
(Australia) C Ball (Australia) M Reid	6	3	[10]
(United States) C Buchanan (United States) T Sandgren	6	3	[11]
2	(United States) B Klahn (Canada) A Shamasdin	3	6	[13]

Final
(Australia) C Ball (Australia) M Reid	5	2
2	(United States) B Klahn (Canada) A Shamasdin	7	6
