= 2026 Tiburon Challenger – Doubles =

Doubles
- 2026 Tiburon Challenger

Final
- Champions: (Mexico) Hans Hach Verdugo (United States) JJ Tracy
- Runners-up: (United States) Nathaniel Lammons (United States) Jackson Withrow
- Score: 7–6^{(9–7)}, 6–4

Events
Singles	Doubles
- Tiburon Challenger

Finn Reynolds and James Watt were the defending champions but chose not to defend their title.

Hans Hach Verdugo and JJ Tracy won the title after defeating Nathaniel Lammons and Jackson Withrow 7–6^{(9–7)}, 6–4 in the final.

== Seeds ==
1. (United States) Robert Galloway / (United States) Evan King (quarterfinals)
2. (United States) Robert Cash / (United States) Ryan Seggerman (semifinals)
3. (Mexico) Santiago González / (Australia) John-Patrick Smith (semifinals)
4. (Netherlands) Jean-Julien Rojer / (United States) Theodore Winegar (quarterfinals)

== Draw ==
Key

- Q = Qualifier
- WC = Wild card
- LL = Lucky loser
- Alt = Alternate
- ITF = ITF entry
- PR = Protected ranking
- SR = Special ranking
- SE = Special exempt
- JE = Junior exempt
- JR = Junior Accelerator Programme entrant
- CO = College Accelerator Programme entrant
- NG = Next Gen Accelerator Program entrant
- w/o = Walkover
- r = Retired
- d = Defaulted

First round
1	(United States) R Galloway (United States) E King	6	6
(United States) D Milavsky (United States) B Shick	4	4
(Mexico) H Hach Verdugo (United States) JJ Tracy	4	6	[10]
(United States) M Mmoh (United States) A Rybakov	6	2	[3]
3	(Mexico) S González (Australia) J-P Smith	4	6	[10]
(United States) A Ayeni (United States) K Smith	6	3	[5]
(Brazil) L Britto (Brazil) I Marcondes	6^{6}	6	[7]
(Argentina) FA Gómez (Venezuela) LD Martínez	7^{8}	3	[10]
(United States) N Lammons (United States) J Withrow	6^{4}	6	[15]
Alt	E Arutiunian; D Ostapenkov	7^{7}	4	[13]
(United Kingdom) A Gray (United Kingdom) H Searle	0	5
4	(Netherlands) J-J Rojer (United States) T Winegar	6	7
(United States) Andre Ilagan (United States) E Zhu	6	6
(United States) T Hilderbrand (United States) M Kiger	4	4
WC	(Brazil) Juan Pedro Etchecoin (Brazil) Paulo Hugo Etchecoin	3	0
2	(United States) R Cash (United States) R Seggerman	6	6

Quarterfinals
1	(United States) R Galloway (United States) E King	4	2
(Mexico) H Hach Verdugo (United States) JJ Tracy	6	6
3	(Mexico) S González (Australia) J-P Smith	6	7^{11}
(Argentina) FA Gómez (Venezuela) LD Martínez	3	6^{9}
(United States) N Lammons (United States) J Withrow	4	6	[10]
4	(Netherlands) J-J Rojer (United States) T Winegar	6	3	[8]
(United States) A Ilagan (United States) E Zhu	7^{11}	5	[5]
2	(United States) R Cash (United States) R Seggerman	6^{9}	7	[10]

Semifinals
(Mexico) H Hach Verdugo (United States) JJ Tracy	7	4	[10]
3	(Mexico) S González (Australia) J-P Smith	5	6	[8]
(United States) N Lammons (United States) J Withrow	7^{7}	6^{5}	[10]
2	(United States) R Cash (United States) R Seggerman	6^{5}	7^{7}	[3]

Final
(Mexico) H Hach Verdugo (United States) JJ Tracy	7^{9}	6
(United States) N Lammons (United States) J Withrow	6^{7}	4
