= 2012 Tiburon Challenger – Doubles =

Doubles
- 2012 Tiburon Challenger

Final
- Champions: (South Africa) Rik de Voest (Australia) Chris Guccione
- Runners-up: (Australia) Jordan Kerr (Sweden) Andreas Siljeström
- Score: 6–1, 6–4

Events
| Singles | Doubles |
| ← 2011 · | Tiburon Challenger | · 2013 → |

Carsten Ball and Chris Guccione were the defending champions but Ball decided not to participate.
Guccione played alongside Rik de Voest and won the final against Jordan Kerr and Andreas Siljeström 6–1, 6–4.

== Seeds ==
1. (Colombia) Robert Farah / (United States) Steve Johnson (semifinals)
2. (Australia) Jordan Kerr / (Sweden) Andreas Siljeström (final)
3. (United States) Bobby Reynolds / (South Africa) Izak van der Merwe (first round)
4. (South Africa) Rik de Voest / (Australia) Chris Guccione (champions)

== Draw ==
=== Key ===
- Q = Qualifier
- WC = Wild card
- LL = Lucky loser
- Alt = Alternate
- SE = Special exempt
- PR = Protected ranking
- ITF = ITF entry
- JE = Junior exempt
- w/o = Walkover
- r = Retired
- d = Defaulted
- SR = Special ranking

=== Draw ===
First round
1 | (Colombia) R Farah (United States) S Johnson | 6 | 6
(United States) D Courtney (India) P Raja | 3 | 3
WC | (United States) B Klahn (United States) R Thacher | 4 | 6 | [10]
(United States) D Kudla (United States) T Smyczek | 6 | 4 | [5]
4 | (South Africa) R de Voest (Australia) C Guccione | 6 | 6
(Romania) A Dăescu (Australia) A Hubble | 2 | 4
WC | (United States) D Kosakowski (United States) N Meister | 3 | 6 | [5]
WC | (United States) T Sandgren (United States) R Williams | 6 | 1 | [10]
(Italy) S Ianni (Italy) M Viola | 7 | 6^{5} | [10]
PR | (India) P Amritraj (Australia) S Groth | 5 | 7^{7} | [12]
(United States) A Kuznetsov (Germany) M Zverev | 7^{11} | 6
3 | (United States) B Reynolds (South Africa) I van der Merwe | 6^{9} | 3
(Germany) B Becker (Australia) M Reid | 3 | 0
(Ukraine) S Bubka (United States) J Sock | 6 | 6
Q | (Switzerland) Adrien Bossel (Croatia) Ante Pavić | 7^{7} | 5 | [3]
2 | (Australia) J Kerr (Sweden) A Siljeström | 6^{5} | 7 | [10]

Quarterfinals
1 | (Colombia) R Farah (United States) S Johnson | 6 | 6
WC | (United States) B Klahn (United States) R Thacher | 2 | 3
4 | (South Africa) R de Voest (Australia) C Guccione | 7^{7} | 5 | [10]
WC | (United States) T Sandgren (United States) R Williams | 6^{5} | 7 | [4]
PR | (India) P Amritraj (Australia) S Groth | 4 | 6 | [8]
(United States) A Kuznetsov (Germany) M Zverev | 6 | 3 | [10]
(Ukraine) S Bubka (United States) J Sock | 2 | 1
2 | (Australia) J Kerr (Sweden) A Siljeström | 6 | 6

Semifinals
1 | (Colombia) R Farah (United States) S Johnson | 7^{7} | 3 | [6]
4 | (South Africa) R de Voest (Australia) C Guccione | 6^{3} | 6 | [10]
(United States) A Kuznetsov (Germany) M Zverev | 3 | 5
2 | (Australia) J Kerr (Sweden) A Siljeström | 6 | 7

Final
4 | (South Africa) R de Voest (Australia) C Guccione | 6 | 6
2 | (Australia) J Kerr (Sweden) A Siljeström | 1 | 4
