= 2014 Tiburon Challenger =

- Date: 4–10 October 2014
- Edition: 8th
- Surface: Hard
- Location: Tiburon, California, United States

Champions

Singles
- (United States) Sam Querrey

Doubles
- (United States) Bradley Klahn / (Canada) Adil Shamasdin
← 2013 ·	Tiburon Challenger	· 2015 →

The 2014 Tiburon Challenger was a professional tennis tournament played on hard courts. It was the eighth edition of the tournament which was part of the 2014 ATP Challenger Tour. It took place in Tiburon, California, United States between October 4 and October 10, 2014.

== Singles main-draw entrants ==
=== Seeds ===
Country	Player	Rank^{1}	Seed
USA	Sam Querrey	52	1
USA	Tim Smyczek	102	2
USA	Bradley Klahn	118	3
CAN	Peter Polansky	122	4
USA	Denis Kudla	125	5
NED	Thiemo de Bakker	143	6
CAN	Frank Dancevic	145	7
ITA	Luca Vanni	166	8

- ^{1} Rankings are as of September 15, 2014.

=== Other entrants ===
The following players received wildcards into the singles main draw:

- (United States) Daniel Nguyen
- (United States) Tom Fawcett
- (United States) Bjorn Fratangelo
- (United States) Jared Donaldson

The following players received entry with a protected ranking into the singles main draw:

- (United States) Tennys Sandgren
- (Australia) John Millman

The following players received entry from the qualifying draw:

- (Germany) Nils Langer
- (United States) Dennis Novikov
- (Australia) Matt Reid
- (United States) Marcos Giron

== Champions ==
=== Singles ===
- (United States) Sam Querrey def. (Australia) John Millman, 6–4, 6–2

=== Doubles ===
- (United States) Bradley Klahn / (Canada) Adil Shamasdin def. (Australia) Carsten Ball / (Australia) Matt Reid, 7–5, 6–2
