= 2025 Tiburon Challenger – Doubles =

Doubles
- 2025 Tiburon Challenger

Final
- Champions: (New Zealand) Finn Reynolds (New Zealand) James Watt
- Runners-up: (United States) Benjamin Kittay (United States) Joshua Sheehy
- Score: 6–2, 6–3

Events
Singles	Doubles
- Tiburon Challenger

Luke Saville and Tristan Schoolkate were the defending champions but chose not to defend their title.

Finn Reynolds and James Watt won the title after defeating Benjamin Kittay and Joshua Sheehy 6–2, 6–3 in the final.

== Seeds ==
1. (New Zealand) Finn Reynolds / (New Zealand) James Watt (champions)
2. (India) Siddhant Banthia / (India) Ramkumar Ramanathan (quarterfinals)
3. (United States) George Goldhoff / (United States) Theodore Winegar (semifinals)
4. (Venezuela) Luis David Martínez / (Germany) Daniel Masur (first round)

== Draw ==
Key

- Q = Qualifier
- WC = Wild card
- LL = Lucky loser
- Alt = Alternate
- ITF = ITF entry
- PR = Protected ranking
- SR = Special ranking
- SE = Special exempt
- JE = Junior exempt
- JR = Junior Accelerator Programme entrant
- CO = College Accelerator Programme entrant
- NG = Next Gen Accelerator Program entrant
- w/o = Walkover
- r = Retired
- d = Defaulted

=== Draw ===
First round
1	(New Zealand) F Reynolds (New Zealand) J Watt	6	6
WC	(United States) S Banerjee (United States) N Godsick	3	4
(Australia) P Harper (United States) T Zink	4	6	[10]
PR	(United Kingdom) J Pinnington Jones (Australia) P Sekulic	6	1	[4]
3	(United States) G Goldhoff (United States) T Winegar	6	6
(Philippines) FC Alcantara (Netherlands) T Loof	3	4
(Venezuela) Juan José Bianchi (Mexico) H Hach Verdugo	7	6
(Italy) F Bondioli (Italy) CA Caniato	5	4
(Czech Republic) M Gengel (Kazakhstan) D Popko	6	2	[10]
(United States) K Chopra (United States) A Martin	4	6	[8]
WC	(United States) B Kittay (United States) J Sheehy	6	6
4	(Venezuela) LD Martínez (Germany) D Masur	1	4
(Australia) K Pearson (Poland) F Pieczonka	7	6
(United Kingdom) S Duncan (United Kingdom) T Hands	5	3
(United States) M Cassone (United States) M Krueger	3	4
2	(India) S Banthia (India) R Ramanathan	6	6

Quarterfinals
1	(New Zealand) F Reynolds (New Zealand) J Watt	7	4	[10]
(Australia) P Harper (United States) T Zink	5	6	[2]
3	(United States) G Goldhoff (United States) T Winegar	7	6
(Venezuela) JJ Bianchi (Mexico) H Hach Verdugo	5	4
(Czech Republic) M Gengel (Kazakhstan) D Popko	5	3
WC	(United States) B Kittay (United States) J Sheehy	7	6
(Australia) K Pearson (Poland) F Pieczonka	6	6
2	(India) S Banthia (India) R Ramanathan	2	4

Semifinals
1	(New Zealand) F Reynolds (New Zealand) J Watt	6	6^{4}	[10]
3	(United States) G Goldhoff (United States) T Winegar	3	7^{7}	[7]
WC	(United States) B Kittay (United States) J Sheehy	6	7^{7}
(Australia) K Pearson (Poland) F Pieczonka	4	6^{3}

Final
1	(New Zealand) F Reynolds (New Zealand) J Watt	6	6
WC	(United States) B Kittay (United States) J Sheehy	2	3
