= 2023 Tiburon Challenger =

- Date: 2–8 October
- Edition: 15th
- Surface: Hard
- Location: Tiburon, United States

Champions

Singles
- (United States) Zachary Svajda

Doubles
- (United Kingdom) Luke Johnson / (Tunisia) Skander Mansouri
← 2022 ·	Tiburon Challenger	· 2024 →

The 2023 Tiburon Challenger presented by Raymond James Financial was a professional tennis tournament played on outdoor hardcourts. It was the 15th edition of the tournament which was part of the 2023 ATP Challenger Tour. It took place in Tiburon, United States between October 2 and October 8, 2023.

== Singles main draw entrants ==
=== Seeds ===
Country	Player	Rank^{1}	Seed
USA	Alex Michelsen	110	1
USA	Nicolas Moreno de Alboran	156	2
USA	Zachary Svajda	167	3
USA	Denis Kudla	173	4
CAN	Alexis Galarneau	176	5
CAN	Vasek Pospisil	186	6
GBR	Ryan Peniston	197	7
USA	Tennys Sandgren	200	8

- ^{1} Rankings are as of September 25, 2023.

=== Other entrants ===
The following players received wildcards into the singles main draw:

- (United States) Ozan Baris
- (United States) Stefan Dostanic
- (United States) Learner Tien

The following player received entry into the singles main draw using a protected ranking:

- (United States) Christian Harrison

The following players received entry from the qualifying draw:

- (United States) Nishesh Basavareddy
- (United States) Garrett Johns
- (United States) Cannon Kingsley
- (United States) Thai-Son Kwiatkowski
- (United States) Alfredo Perez
- (Canada) Brayden Schnur

== Champions ==
=== Singles ===
- (United States) Zachary Svajda def. (Australia) Adam Walton 6–2, 6–2.

=== Doubles ===
- (United Kingdom) Luke Johnson / (Tunisia) Skander Mansouri def. (United States) William Blumberg / (Venezuela) Luis David Martínez 6–2, 6–3.
