= 2011 Royal Bank of Scotland Challenger – Doubles =

Doubles
- 2011 Royal Bank of Scotland Challenger

Final
- Champions: (Australia) Carsten Ball (Australia) Chris Guccione
- Runners-up: (United States) Steve Johnson (United States) Sam Querrey
- Score: 6–1, 5–7, [10–6]

Events
Singles	Doubles
- Royal Bank of Scotland Challenger

Robert Kendrick and Travis Rettenmaier were the defending champions but Kendrick decided not to participate.
Rettenmaier played alongside Simon Stadler, losing in the first round.
Carsten Ball and Chris Guccione won the title, defeating Steve Johnson and Sam Querrey 6–1, 5–7, [10–6] in the final.

== Seeds ==
1. (Colombia) Juan Sebastián Cabal / (Colombia) Robert Farah (quarterfinals)
2. (Philippines) Treat Conrad Huey / (South Africa) Izak van der Merwe (quarterfinals)
3. (Denmark) Frederik Nielsen / (United States) Travis Parrott (first round)
4. (Australia) Jordan Kerr / (United States) David Martin (first round)

== Draw ==
Key

- Q = Qualifier
- WC = Wild card
- LL = Lucky loser
- Alt = Alternate
- ITF = ITF entry
- PR = Protected ranking
- SR = Special ranking
- SE = Special exempt
- JE = Junior exempt
- JR = Junior Accelerator Programme entrant
- CO = College Accelerator Programme entrant
- NG = Next Gen Accelerator Program entrant
- w/o = Walkover
- r = Retired
- d = Defaulted

=== Draw ===
First round
1	(Colombia) JS Cabal (Colombia) R Farah	7^{7}	6
(Bosnia and Herzegovina) A Delić (Croatia) I Karlović	6^{4}	1
(Thailand) Sa Ratiwatana (Thailand) So Ratiwatana	5	1
(United States) A Kuznetsov (United States) R Sweeting	7	6
4	(Australia) J Kerr (United States) D Martin	1	6	[8]
WC	(United States) S Johnson (United States) S Querrey	6	3	[10]
WC	(United States) B Battistone (United States) C Wettengel	6	6
WC	(United States) K Flach (United States) R Leach	4	2
(Australia) C Ball (Australia) C Guccione	6	6
(United States) T Rettenmaier (Germany) S Stadler	1	4
(Lithuania) L Grigelis (Belarus) U Ignatik	6	6
3	(Denmark) F Nielsen (United States) T Parrott	2	4
(Canada) V Pospisil (United States) B Reynolds	7^{7}	6
(United States) JP Fruttero (South Africa) R Klaasen	6^{3}	4
Q	(Canada) P-L Duclos (Australia) A Hubble	0	2
2	(Philippines) TC Huey (South Africa) I van der Merwe	6	6

Quarterfinals
1	(Colombia) JS Cabal (Colombia) R Farah	6	2	[9]
(United States) A Kuznetsov (United States) R Sweeting	4	6	[11]
WC	(United States) S Johnson (United States) S Querrey	7^{7}	7^{7}
WC	(United States) B Battistone (United States) C Wettengel	6^{2}	6^{4}
(Australia) C Ball (Australia) C Guccione	6	6
(Lithuania) L Grigelis (Belarus) U Ignatik	1	2
(Canada) V Pospisil (United States) B Reynolds	4	6	[10]
2	(Philippines) TC Huey (South Africa) I van der Merwe	6	3	[7]

Semifinals
(United States) A Kuznetsov (United States) R Sweeting	3	5
WC	(United States) S Johnson (United States) S Querrey	6	7
(Australia) C Ball (Australia) C Guccione	6	6
(Canada) V Pospisil (United States) B Reynolds	4	3

Final
WC	(United States) S Johnson (United States) S Querrey	1	7	[6]
(Australia) C Ball (Australia) C Guccione	6	5	[10]
