= 2024 Tiburon Challenger – Singles =

Singles
- 2024 Tiburon Challenger

Final
- Champion: (United States) Nishesh Basavareddy
- Runner-up: (United States) Eliot Spizzirri
- Score: 6–1, 6–1

Events
Singles	Doubles
- Tiburon Challenger

Zachary Svajda was the defending champion but chose not to defend his title.

Nishesh Basavareddy won the title after defeating Eliot Spizzirri 6–1, 6–1 in the final.

== Seeds ==
1. (United States) Christopher Eubanks (withdrew)
2. (United States) Learner Tien (semifinals)
3. (United States) J. J. Wolf (quarterfinals)
4. (Australia) Tristan Schoolkate (second round)
5. (United States) Patrick Kypson (first round)
6. (Jordan) Abdullah Shelbayh (second round)
7. (United States) Brandon Holt (second round)
8. (United States) Denis Kudla (quarterfinals)
9. (United States) Ethan Quinn (first round)

== Draw ==
Key

- Q = Qualifier
- WC = Wild card
- LL = Lucky loser
- Alt = Alternate
- ITF = ITF entry
- PR = Protected ranking
- SR = Special ranking
- SE = Special exempt
- JE = Junior exempt
- JR = Junior Accelerator Programme entrant
- CO = College Accelerator Programme entrant
- NG = Next Gen Accelerator Program entrant
- w/o = Walkover
- r = Retired
- d = Defaulted

=== Finals ===
Semifinals
(United States) Nishesh Basavareddy	6	6
(United Kingdom) Jack Pinnington Jones	2	3
(United States) Eliot Spizzirri	7^{8}	6^{3}	6
2	(United States) Learner Tien	6^{6}	7^{7}	2

Final
(United States) Nishesh Basavareddy	6	6
(United States) Eliot Spizzirri	1	1

=== Top half ===
First round
9	(United States) E Quinn	5	6^{4}
(Canada) A Galarneau	7	7^{7}
(Brazil) K Sell	6	7^{9}
(France) Antoine Cornut-Chauvinc	4	6^{7}
(United States) N Basavareddy	6	4	6
(Australia) B Tomic	3	6	3
(Ecuador) A Andrade	1	6^{4}
7	(United States) B Holt	6	7^{7}
4	(Australia) T Schoolkate	6	7^{7}
Alt	(Netherlands) G den Ouden	3	6^{5}
(United Kingdom) J Pinnington Jones	6	6
(United States) A Mayo	2	3
(Switzerland) R Bertola	7^{7}	6
WC	(United States) K Bigun	6^{4}	4
WC	(United States) C Smith	6	6
5	(United States) P Kypson	3	2

Second round
(Canada) A Galarneau	3	3
(Brazil) K Sell	6	6
(United States) N Basavareddy	6	6
7	(United States) B Holt	2	4
4	(Australia) T Schoolkate	4	4
(United Kingdom) J Pinnington Jones	6	6
(Switzerland) R Bertola	4	6	3
WC	(United States) C Smith	6	3	6

Quarterfinals
(Brazil) K Sell	5	0
(United States) N Basavareddy	7	6
(United Kingdom) J Pinnington Jones	7^{7}	6
WC	(United States) C Smith	6^{5}	4

Semifinals
(United States) N Basavareddy	6	6
(United Kingdom) J Pinnington Jones	2	3

=== Bottom half ===
First round
6	(Jordan) A Shelbayh	6	7^{7}
SE	(Lithuania) E Butvilas	4	6^{2}
(United States) E Spizzirri	3	6	6
Q	(United States) O Baris	6	3	3
Q	(Colombia) N Mejía	3	7	6
Q	(United States) Christian Langmo	6	5	2
PR	(Switzerland) D Stricker	5^{r}
3	(United States) JJ Wolf	3
8	(United States) D Kudla	7^{7}	6^{3}	6
WC	(Denmark) CE Overbeck	6^{4}	7^{7}	4
(Venezuela) G Oliveira	6	6
Q	A Zakharov	4	2
Q	(United States) Micah Braswell	6	3	6
(Australia) D Sweeny	2	6	1
Q	(United States) G Nanda	6^{7}	1
2	(United States) L Tien	7^{9}	6

Second round
6	(Jordan) A Shelbayh	6	6^{2}	4
(United States) E Spizzirri	4	7^{7}	6
Q	(Colombia) N Mejía	1	6	4
3	(United States) JJ Wolf	6	3	6
8	(United States) D Kudla	7	3	6
(Venezuela) G Oliveira	5	6	2
Q	(United States) M Braswell	2	6^{6}
2	(United States) L Tien	6	7^{8}

Quarterfinals
(United States) E Spizzirri	6	1	7
3	(United States) JJ Wolf	3	6	5
8	(United States) D Kudla	6^{5}	3
2	(United States) L Tien	7^{7}	6

Semifinals
(United States) E Spizzirri	7^{8}	6^{3}	6
2	(United States) L Tien	6^{6}	7^{7}	2
