= 2011 Royal Bank of Scotland Challenger =

- Date: 10–16 October
- Edition: 5th
- Surface: Hard
- Location: Tiburon, United States

Champions

Singles
- (Croatia) Ivo Karlović

Doubles
- (Australia) Carsten Ball / (Australia) Chris Guccione
← 2010 ·	Royal Bank of Scotland Challenger	· 2012 →

The 2011 Royal Bank of Scotland Challenger was a professional tennis tournament played on hard courts. It was the fifth edition of the tournament which was part of the 2011 ATP Challenger Tour. It took place in Tiburon, United States between October 10 and October 16, 2011.

== ATP entrants ==
=== Seeds ===
Country	Player	Rank^{1}	Seed
USA	Ryan Sweeting	67	1
CRO	Ivo Karlović	76	2
USA	Sam Querrey	120	3
USA	Bobby Reynolds	121	4
CAN	Vasek Pospisil	129	5
RSA	Izak van der Merwe	136	6
USA	Wayne Odesnik	147	7
GER	Björn Phau	149	8

- ^{1} Rankings are as of October 3, 2011.

=== Other entrants ===
The following players received wildcards into the singles main draw:

- (United States) Steve Johnson
- (United States) Daniel Kosakowski
- (United States) Denis Kudla
- (United States) Jack Sock

The following players received entry as a special exempt into the singles main draw:

- (United States) Alex Kuznetsov

The following players received entry from the qualifying draw:

- (United Kingdom) Alex Bogdanovic
- (Canada) Pierre-Ludovic Duclos
- (Colombia) Alejandro González
- (New Zealand) Artem Sitak

== Champions ==
=== Singles ===
(Croatia) Ivo Karlović def. (United States) Sam Querrey, 6–7^{(2–7)}, 6–1, 6–4

=== Doubles ===
(Australia) Carsten Ball / (Australia) Chris Guccione def. (United States) Steve Johnson / (United States) Sam Querrey, 6–1, 5–7, [10–6]
