= 2019 Tiburon Challenger – Singles =

Singles
- 2019 Tiburon Challenger

Final
- Champion: (United States) Tommy Paul
- Runner-up: (Australia) Thanasi Kokkinakis
- Score: 7–5, 6–7^{(3–7)}, 6–4

Events
Singles	Doubles
- Tiburon Challenger

Michael Mmoh was the defending champion but lost in the second round to Brandon Nakashima.

Tommy Paul won the title after defeating Thanasi Kokkinakis 7–5, 6–7^{(3–7)}, 6–4 in the final.

== Seeds ==
All seeds receive a bye into the second round.

1. (United States) Tommy Paul (champion)
2. (United States) Denis Kudla (second round)
3. (United States) Marcos Giron (third round)
4. (Ecuador) Emilio Gómez (semifinals)
5. (Denmark) Mikael Torpegaard (third round)
6. (United States) Michael Mmoh (second round)
7. (Barbados) Darian King (third round)
8. (Australia) Thanasi Kokkinakis (final)
9. (France) Enzo Couacaud (third round)
10. (United States) Christopher Eubanks (third round)
11. (United States) Mitchell Krueger (second round)
12. (Canada) Peter Polansky (second round)
13. (Colombia) Daniel Elahi Galán (second round)
14. (United States) Thai-Son Kwiatkowski (semifinals)
15. (United States) Ernesto Escobedo (third round)
16. (United States) Maxime Cressy (quarterfinals)

== Draw ==
Key

- Q = Qualifier
- WC = Wild card
- LL = Lucky loser
- Alt = Alternate
- ITF = ITF entry
- PR = Protected ranking
- SR = Special ranking
- SE = Special exempt
- JE = Junior exempt
- JR = Junior Accelerator Programme entrant
- CO = College Accelerator Programme entrant
- NG = Next Gen Accelerator Program entrant
- w/o = Walkover
- r = Retired
- d = Defaulted

=== Finals ===
Quarterfinals
1	(United States) Tommy Paul	6	1	7^{7}
(Ecuador) Gonzalo Escobar	4	6	6^{2}
4	(Ecuador) Emilio Gómez	6	1	6
(United States) Sekou Bangoura	3	6	2
WC	(United States) Brandon Nakashima	5	6	6^{6}
14	(United States) Thai-Son Kwiatkowski	7	1	7^{8}
8	(Australia) Thanasi Kokkinakis	6	6
16	(United States) Maxime Cressy	4	2

Semifinals
1	(United States) Tommy Paul	6	7^{7}
4	(Ecuador) Emilio Gómez	1	6^{5}
14	(United States) Thai-Son Kwiatkowski	6	2	1
8	(Australia) Thanasi Kokkinakis	2	6	6

Final
1	(United States) Tommy Paul	7	6^{3}	6
8	(Australia) Thanasi Kokkinakis	5	7^{7}	4

=== Top half ===
==== Section 1 ====
First round
WC	(United States) B Holt	6	6^{6}	6
PR	(United States) R Sarmiento	4	7^{8}	3
(France) H Gaston	3	6	6
(United States) Evan Song	6	4	4
(United States) Roy Smith	2	6	2
(Ecuador) G Escobar	6	3	6
(United States) A Ritschard	0	4
(United Kingdom) R Peniston	6	6

Second round
1	(United States) T Paul	5	6	6
WC	(United States) B Holt	7	3	2
(France) H Gaston	3	6	6
13	(Colombia) DE Galán	6	3	4
11	(United States) M Krueger	6^{7}	3
(Ecuador) G Escobar	7^{9}	6
(United Kingdom) R Peniston	6	4	3
5	(Denmark) M Torpegaard	4	6	6

Third round
1	(United States) T Paul	7^{10}	6
(France) H Gaston	6^{8}	1
(Ecuador) G Escobar	6	7^{11}
5	(Denmark) M Torpegaard	4	6^{9}

Quarterfinals
1	(United States) T Paul	6	1	7^{7}
(Ecuador) G Escobar	4	6	6^{2}

==== Section 2 ====
First round
(Greece) M Pervolarakis	6	7^{7}
(Northern Mariana Islands) C Sinclair	3	6^{0}
(United States) D Young	6	6
(United States) R Shane	1	1
(United States) S Bangoura	6	7
Q	(Belgium) M Geerts	4	5
WC	(United States) E Nava	2	3
(United States) U Blanch	6	6

Second round
4	(Ecuador) E Gómez	5	6	6
(Greece) M Pervolarakis	7	0	4
(United States) D Young	1	2^{r}
15	(United States) E Escobedo	6	4
12	(Canada) P Polansky	1	4
(United States) S Bangoura	6	6
(United States) U Blanch	6	6^{2}	5
7	(Barbados) D King	2	7^{7}	7

Third round
4	(Ecuador) E Gómez	7^{7}	2	6
15	(United States) E Escobedo	6^{4}	6	2
(United States) S Bangoura	1	6	6
7	(Barbados) D King	6	4	0

Quarterfinals
4	(Ecuador) E Gómez	6	1	6
(United States) S Bangoura	3	6	2

=== Bottom half ===
==== Section 3 ====
First round
(United States) Ma Redlicki	3	3
WC	(United States) B Nakashima	6	6
Q	(United States) E Zhu	3	4
(El Salvador) M Arévalo	6	6
PR	(Spain) C Gómez-Herrera	6	4	6
(Germany) S Fanselow	4	6	2
(Canada) F Peliwo	3	7	3
(United States) Mi Redlicki	6	5	6

Second round
6	(United States) M Mmoh	7	3	4
WC	(United States) B Nakashima	5	6	6
(El Salvador) M Arévalo	4	4
10	(United States) C Eubanks	6	6
14	(United States) T-S Kwiatkowski	6	6
PR	(Spain) C Gómez-Herrera	4	4
(United States) Mi Redlicki	4	5
3	(United States) M Giron	6	7

Third round
WC	(United States) B Nakashima	7^{7}	7
10	(United States) C Eubanks	6^{5}	5
14	(United States) T-S Kwiatkowski	4	7^{7}	6
3	(United States) M Giron	6	6^{3}	4

Quarterfinals
WC	(United States) B Nakashima	5	6	6^{6}
14	(United States) T-S Kwiatkowski	7	1	7^{8}

==== Section 4 ====
First round
(Israel) E Leshem	6^{3}	6	6
WC	(United States) O Crawford	7^{7}	4	4
(United States) JC Aragone	6	7^{7}
(United States) C Altamirano	2	6^{3}
(United States) A Sarkissian	7^{7}	6^{3}	4
(United States) J. J. Wolf	6^{3}	7^{7}	6
WC	(Czech Republic) O Štyler	6	4	4
(Ecuador) R Quiroz	3	6	6

Second round
8	(Australia) T Kokkinakis	6	6
(Israel) E Leshem	4	0
(United States) JC Aragone	3	1
9	(France) E Couacaud	6	6
16	(United States) M Cressy	6	6
(United States) J. J. Wolf	1	4
(Ecuador) R Quiroz	6	6
2	(United States) D Kudla	3	2

Third round
8	(Australia) T Kokkinakis	7	6
9	(France) E Couacaud	5	1
16	(United States) M Cressy	5	6	6
(Ecuador) R Quiroz	7	2	3

Quarterfinals
8	(Australia) T Kokkinakis	6	6
16	(United States) M Cressy	4	2
