= 2010 Royal Bank of Scotland Challenger =

- Date: 12–17 October
- Edition: 4th
- Surface: Hard
- Location: Tiburon, California, United States

Champions

Singles
- (Germany) Tobias Kamke

Doubles
- (United States) Robert Kendrick / (United States) Travis Rettenmaier
← 2009 ·	Royal Bank of Scotland Challenger	· 2011 →

The 2010 Royal Bank of Scotland Challenger was a professional tennis tournament played on hard courts. It was the fourth edition of the tournament which is part of the 2010 ATP Challenger Tour. It took place in Tiburon, California, United States between October 12 and October 17, 2010.

== Singles main-draw entrants ==
=== Seeds ===
Country	Player	Rank^{1}	Seed
GER	Tobias Kamke	88	1
USA	Donald Young	108	2
GER	Julian Reister	112	3
USA	Ryan Sweeting	114	4
USA	Robert Kendrick	151	5
AUS	Carsten Ball	153	6
RSA	Izak van der Merwe	155	7
AUS	Marinko Matosevic	169	8

- Rankings are as of October 4, 2010.

=== Other entrants ===
The following players received wildcards into the singles main draw:

- (United States) Bradley Klahn
- (United States) Daniel Kosakowski
- (United States) Raymond Sarmiento
- (United States) Blake Strode

The following players received entry as a special entrant into the singles main draw:

- (Ecuador) Giovanni Lapentti

The following players received entry as an alternate into the singles main draw:

- (United States) Ryler DeHeart

The following players received entry from the qualifying draw:

- (United Kingdom) Jamie Baker
- (Canada) Pierre-Ludovic Duclos
- (Belarus) Kiryl Harbatsiuk
- (Denmark) Frederik Nielsen

The following players received entry as a Lucky loser into the singles main draw:

- (United States) Jesse Witten

== Champions ==
=== Singles ===
(Germany) Tobias Kamke def. (United States) Ryan Harrison, 6–1, 6–1

=== Doubles ===
(United States) Robert Kendrick / (United States) Travis Rettenmaier def. (United States) Ryler DeHeart / (Canada) Pierre-Ludovic Duclos, 6–1, 6–4
