= 2015 Tiburon Challenger – Singles =

Singles
- 2015 Tiburon Challenger

Final
- Champion: (United States) Tim Smyczek
- Runner-up: (United States) Denis Kudla
- Score: 1–6, 6–1, 7–6^{(9–7)}

Events
| Singles | Doubles |
- Tiburon Challenger

Sam Querrey was the defending champion, but chose not to compete this year.

== Seeds ==
1. (United States) Denis Kudla (final)
2. (United Kingdom) Kyle Edmund (first round)
3. (United States) Tim Smyczek (champion)
4. (Germany) Dustin Brown (first round)
5. (United States) Ryan Harrison (second round)
6. (United States) Bjorn Fratangelo (quarterfinals, retired)
7. (Slovenia) Blaž Rola (quarterfinals)
8. (United States) Jared Donaldson (second round)

== Draw ==
Key

- Q = Qualifier
- WC = Wild card
- LL = Lucky loser
- Alt = Alternate
- ITF = ITF entry
- PR = Protected ranking
- SR = Special ranking
- SE = Special exempt
- JE = Junior exempt
- JR = Junior Accelerator Programme entrant
- CO = College Accelerator Programme entrant
- NG = Next Gen Accelerator Program entrant
- w/o = Walkover
- r = Retired
- d = Defaulted

=== Finals ===
Semifinals
1 | (United States) Denis Kudla | 6 | 1 | 6
WC | (United States) Mackenzie McDonald | 2 | 6 | 4
3 | (United States) Tim Smyczek | 6 | 6
(France) Quentin Halys | 3 | 1

Final
1 | (United States) Denis Kudla | 6 | 1 | 6^{7}
3 | (United States) Tim Smyczek | 1 | 6 | 7^{9}

=== Top half ===
First round
1 | (United States) D Kudla | 4 | 7^{7} | 6
(United States) Connor Smith | 6 | 6^{2} | 0
Q | (Switzerland) H Laaksonen | 6 | 6
WC | (Sweden) A Göransson | 2 | 4
PR | (Canada) P Polansky | 4 | 3
Alt | (Bulgaria) D Kutrovsky | 6 | 6
(United States) F Tiafoe | 7^{7} | 6^{6} | 3
7 | (Slovenia) B Rola | 6^{0} | 7^{8} | 6
4 | (Germany) D Brown | 2 | 5
Q | (United States) S Bangoura | 6 | 7
WC | (United States) M McDonald | 6 | 6
(Denmark) F Nielsen | 4 | 4
SE | (United States) A Kuznetsov | 7^{7} | 6
Q | (United States) N Meister | 6^{4} | 3
WC | (United States) C Buchanan | 1 | 3
6 | (United States) B Fratangelo | 6 | 6

Second round
1 | (United States) D Kudla | 2 | 6 | 6
Q | (Switzerland) H Laaksonen | 6 | 4 | 3
Alt | (Bulgaria) D Kutrovsky | 3 | 1
7 | (Slovenia) B Rola | 6 | 6
Q | (United States) S Bangoura | 3 | 6 | 6^{3}
WC | (United States) M McDonald | 6 | 3 | 7^{7}
SE | (United States) A Kuznetsov | 6^{5} | 6 | 3
6 | (United States) B Fratangelo | 7^{7} | 3 | 6

Quarterfinals
1 | (United States) D Kudla | 6 | 6
7 | (Slovenia) B Rola | 4 | 3
WC | (United States) M McDonald | 4
6 | (United States) B Fratangelo | 0^{r}

Semifinals
1 | (United States) D Kudla | 6 | 1 | 6
WC | (United States) M McDonald | 2 | 6 | 4

=== Bottom half ===
First round
5 | (United States) R Harrison | 6 | 6
WC | (United States) D Baughman | 3 | 3
(United States) D Novikov | 4 | 3
(Czech Republic) M Michalička | 6 | 6
Q | (United States) Dennis Nevolo | 7 | 7^{7}
(Switzerland) A Bossel | 5 | 6^{5}
(Republic of Ireland) J McGee | 6^{5} | 4
3 | (United States) T Smyczek | 7^{7} | 6
8 | (United States) J Donaldson | 6 | 6
(Barbados) D King | 1 | 4
(United States) M Krueger | 6 | 6^{5} | 6
(Canada) P Bester | 4 | 7^{7} | 1
(France) Q Halys | 6 | 6
(United States) T Sandgren | 3 | 1
(United Kingdom) B Klein | 6 | 6
2 | (United Kingdom) K Edmund | 4 | 1

Second round
5 | (United States) R Harrison | 6^{4} | 6 | 3
(Czech Republic) M Michalička | 7^{7} | 4 | 6
Q | (United States) D Nevolo | 2 | 6 | 1
3 | (United States) T Smyczek | 6 | 3 | 6
8 | (United States) J Donaldson | 3 | 6^{3}
(United States) M Krueger | 6 | 7^{7}
(France) Q Halys | 7^{7} | 6
(United Kingdom) B Klein | 6^{2} | 3

Quarterfinals
(Czech Republic) M Michalička | 3 | 1
3 | (United States) T Smyczek | 6 | 6
(United States) M Krueger | 4 | 3
(France) Q Halys | 6 | 6

Semifinals
3 | (United States) T Smyczek | 6 | 6
(France) Q Halys | 3 | 1
