= 2017 Tiburon Challenger – Singles =

Singles
- 2017 Tiburon Challenger

Final
- Champion: (United Kingdom) Cameron Norrie
- Runner-up: (United States) Tennys Sandgren
- Score: 6–2, 6–3

Events
Singles	Doubles
- Tiburon Challenger

Darian King was the defending champion but lost in the first round to Mackenzie McDonald.

Cameron Norrie won the title after defeating Tennys Sandgren 6–2, 6–3 in the final.

== Seeds ==
1. (Belgium) Ruben Bemelmans (first round)
2. (United States) Tennys Sandgren (final)
3. (France) Quentin Halys (second round)
4. (United States) Michael Mmoh (quarterfinals)
5. (India) Ramkumar Ramanathan (first round)
6. (Barbados) Darian King (first round)
7. (Canada) Félix Auger-Aliassime (first round)
8. (United Kingdom) Cameron Norrie (champion)

== Draw ==
Key

- Q = Qualifier
- WC = Wild card
- LL = Lucky loser
- Alt = Alternate
- ITF = ITF entry
- PR = Protected ranking
- SR = Special ranking
- SE = Special exempt
- JE = Junior exempt
- JR = Junior Accelerator Programme entrant
- CO = College Accelerator Programme entrant
- NG = Next Gen Accelerator Program entrant
- w/o = Walkover
- r = Retired
- d = Defaulted

=== Finals ===
Semifinals
(India) Prajnesh Gunneswaran	3	2
8	(United Kingdom) Cameron Norrie	6	6
(United States) Mackenzie McDonald	6^{4}	6^{3}
2	(United States) Tennys Sandgren	7^{7}	7^{7}

Final
8	(United Kingdom) Cameron Norrie	6	6
2	(United States) Tennys Sandgren	2	3

=== Top half ===
First round
1	(Belgium) R Bemelmans	6	3	3
WC	(United States) T Fawcett	3	6	6
SE	(Canada) F Dancevic	7^{7}	6
WC	(United States) A Sarkissian	6^{5}	4
Q	(United States) E King	2	4
(India) P Gunneswaran	6	6
Q	(United States) D Baughman	6	6
7	(Canada) F Auger-Aliassime	2	2
4	(United States) M Mmoh	6	6
(United States) N Rubin	1	2
(Chile) C Garín	3	1
(Germany) T Kamke	6	6
(Australia) S Groth	4	5
(United States) M Krueger	6	7
(Sweden) E Ymer	5	6	5
8	(United Kingdom) C Norrie	7	3	7

Second round
WC	(United States) T Fawcett	3	4
SE	(Canada) F Dancevic	6	6
(India) P Gunneswaran	7^{7}	6
Q	(United States) D Baughman	6^{5}	4
4	(United States) M Mmoh	6	2	7^{9}
(Germany) T Kamke	3	6	6^{7}
(United States) M Krueger	6	2	2
8	(United Kingdom) C Norrie	4	6	6

Quarterfinals
SE	(Canada) F Dancevic	6	4	4
(India) P Gunneswaran	4	6	6
4	(United States) M Mmoh	5	2
8	(United Kingdom) C Norrie	7	6

Semifinals
(India) P Gunneswaran	3	2
8	(United Kingdom) C Norrie	6	6

=== Bottom half ===
First round
6	(Barbados) D King	5	3
(United States) M McDonald	7	6
(United States) D Kudla	6^{5}	7	6
LL	(United States) T Smyczek	7^{7}	5	3
PR	(Colombia) A González	6	6
SE	(United Kingdom) A Ward	2	4
LL	(Canada) F Peliwo	6	1	2
3	(France) Q Halys	2	6	6
5	(India) R Ramanathan	1	2
LL	(Germany) J Choinski	6	6
WC	(United States) C Harrison	6	6
Q	(Japan) K Uchida	2	4
WC	(South Africa) Wayne Montgomery	3	3
(Canada) B Schnur	6	6
Q	(United States) S Bangoura	4	4
2	(United States) T Sandgren	6	6

Second round
(United States) M McDonald	7^{8}	6
(United States) D Kudla	6^{6}	2
PR	(Colombia) A González	6	6
3	(France) Q Halys	4	3
LL	(Germany) J Choinski	4	6^{5}
WC	(United States) C Harrison	6	7^{7}
(Canada) B Schnur	1	6^{5}
2	(United States) T Sandgren	6	7^{7}

Quarterfinals
(United States) M McDonald	6	3	6
PR	(Colombia) A González	4	6	1
WC	(United States) C Harrison	1	2
2	(United States) T Sandgren	6	6

Semifinals
(United States) M McDonald	6^{4}	6^{3}
2	(United States) T Sandgren	7^{7}	7^{7}
