= 2024 Tiburon Challenger – Doubles =

Doubles
- 2024 Tiburon Challenger

Final
- Champions: (Australia) Luke Saville (Australia) Tristan Schoolkate
- Runners-up: (United States) Patrick Kypson (United States) Eliot Spizzirri
- Score: 6–4, 6–2

Events
Singles	Doubles
- Tiburon Challenger

Luke Johnson and Skander Mansouri were the defending champions but chose not to defend their title.

Luke Saville and Tristan Schoolkate won the title after defeating Patrick Kypson and Eliot Spizzirri 6–4, 6–2 in the final.

== Seeds ==
1. (United States) Mac Kiger / (United States) Patrik Trhac (quarterfinals)
2. (Australia) Luke Saville / (Australia) Tristan Schoolkate (champions)
3. (United States) Trey Hilderbrand / (United States) Alex Lawson (quarterfinals)
4. (New Zealand) Marcus Daniell / (Mexico) Hans Hach Verdugo (first round)

== Draw ==
Key

- Q = Qualifier
- WC = Wild card
- LL = Lucky loser
- Alt = Alternate
- ITF = ITF entry
- PR = Protected ranking
- SR = Special ranking
- SE = Special exempt
- JE = Junior exempt
- JR = Junior Accelerator Programme entrant
- CO = College Accelerator Programme entrant
- NG = Next Gen Accelerator Program entrant
- w/o = Walkover
- r = Retired
- d = Defaulted

=== Draw ===
First round
1	(United States) M Kiger (United States) P Trhac	6	7^{13}
(United States) B Holt (Colombia) N Mejía	3	6^{11}
(Switzerland) R Bertola (Netherlands) G den Ouden	5	4
(United States) P Kypson (United States) E Spizzirri	7	6
3	(United States) T Hilderbrand (United States) A Lawson	7^{7}	6
WC	(United States) N Godsick (United States) E Quinn	6^{4}	3
(Brazil) Gabriel Roveri Sidney (United States) Tennyson Whiting	3	4
(Venezuela) G Oliveira (Canada) K Stevenson	6	6
(United States) Christian Langmo (Australia) B Tomic	3	4
WC	(United States) Theodore Dean (Denmark) CE Overbeck	6	6
(Australia) K Pearson (United States) J Sheehy	6	6
4	(New Zealand) M Daniell (Mexico) H Hach Verdugo	3	4
(Ecuador) A Andrade (Jordan) A Shelbayh	7^{7}	5	[9]
(United States) R Cash (United States) JJ Tracy	6^{3}	7	[11]
(Australia) C Puttergill (Australia) D Sweeny	4	3
2	(Australia) L Saville (Australia) T Schoolkate	6	6

Quarterfinals
1	(United States) M Kiger (United States) P Trhac	3	2
(United States) P Kypson (United States) E Spizzirri	6	6
3	(United States) T Hilderbrand (United States) A Lawson	6	5	[8]
(Venezuela) G Oliveira (Canada) K Stevenson	3	7	[10]
WC	(United States) T Dean (Denmark) CE Overbeck	6	7^{7}
(Australia) K Pearson (United States) J Sheehy	2	6^{5}
(United States) R Cash (United States) JJ Tracy	3	4
2	(Australia) L Saville (Australia) T Schoolkate	6	6

Semifinals
(United States) P Kypson (United States) E Spizzirri	6	6
(Venezuela) G Oliveira (Canada) K Stevenson	1	4
WC	(United States) T Dean (Denmark) CE Overbeck	3	4
2	(Australia) L Saville (Australia) T Schoolkate	6	6

Final
(United States) P Kypson (United States) E Spizzirri	4	2
2	(Australia) L Saville (Australia) T Schoolkate	6	6
