= 2026 Tiburon Challenger =

- Date: September 14–20
- Edition: 18th
- Surface: Hard
- Location: Tiburon, United States

Champions

Singles
- (United States) Darwin Blanch

Doubles
- (Mexico) Hans Hach Verdugo / (United States) JJ Tracy
- Tiburon Challenger

The 2026 Tiburon Challenger was a professional tennis tournament played on outdoor hardcourts. It was the 18th edition of the tournament which was part of the 2026 ATP Challenger Tour. It took place in Tiburon, United States between September 14 and 20, 2026.

== Singles main draw entrants ==
=== Seeds ===
Country	Player	Rank^{1}	Seed
USA	Michael Zheng	107	1
USA	Nishesh Basavareddy	163	2
ARG	Federico Agustín Gómez	169	3
USA	Michael Mmoh	173	4
USA	Tristan Boyer	182	5
USA	Andre Ilagan	184	6
USA	Keegan Smith	193	7
USA	Braden Shick	216	8

- ^{1} Rankings are as of August 31, 2026.

=== Other entrants ===
The following players received wildcards into the singles main draw:

- (United States) Sebastian Gorzny
- (United States) Aidan Mayo
- (United States) J. J. Wolf

The following players received entry into the singles main draw using protected rankings:

- (United States) Patrick Maloney
- (Brazil) Karuê Sell

The following player received entry into the singles main draw as an alternate:

- (United States) Trevor Svajda

The following players received entry from the qualifying draw:

- Erik Arutiunian
- (France) Timo Legout
- (United States) Bryce Nakashima
- (United States) Ryan Seggerman
- (Switzerland) Luca Stäheli
- (United States) Evan Zhu

== Champions ==
=== Singles ===
- (United States) Darwin Blanch def. (United States) Michael Mmoh 3–6, 6–4, 6–2.

=== Doubles ===
- (Mexico) Hans Hach Verdugo / (United States) JJ Tracy def. (United States) Nathaniel Lammons / (United States) Jackson Withrow 7–6^{(9–7)}, 6–4.
