= 2025 Tiburon Challenger =

- Date: 29 September – 5 October
- Edition: 17th
- Surface: Hard
- Location: Tiburon, United States

Champions

Singles
- (United States) Michael Zheng

Doubles
- (New Zealand) Finn Reynolds / (New Zealand) James Watt
- Tiburon Challenger

The 2025 Tiburon Challenger presented by Raymond James was a professional tennis tournament played on outdoor hardcourts. It was the 17th edition of the tournament which was part of the 2025 ATP Challenger Tour. It took place in Tiburon, United States between September 29 and October 5, 2025.

== Singles main draw entrants ==
=== Seeds ===
Country	Player	Rank^{1}	Seed
AUT	Jurij Rodionov	156	1
USA	Murphy Cassone	174	2
GBR	Jack Pinnington Jones	178	3
LBN	Benjamin Hassan	195	4
COL	Nicolás Mejía	199	5
KAZ	Dmitry Popko	214	6
USA	Michael Zheng	227	7
GBR	Johannus Monday	228	8

- ^{1} Rankings are as of September 22, 2025.

=== Other entrants ===
The following players received wildcards into the singles main draw:

- (United States) Samir Banerjee
- (Canada) Duncan Chan
- (United States) Trevor Svajda

The following player received entry into the singles main draw using a protected ranking:

- (Australia) Philip Sekulic

The following player received entry into the singles main draw as a special exempt:

- (Jordan) Abdullah Shelbayh

The following player received entry into the singles main draw through the Next Gen Accelerator programme:

- (Italy) Federico Bondioli

The following player received entry into the singles main draw as an alternate:

- (United Kingdom) Oliver Tarvet

The following players received entry from the qualifying draw:

- (Slovenia) Bor Artnak
- (United States) Micah Braswell
- (United States) Andre Ilagan
- (Germany) Daniel Masur
- (Japan) Renta Tokuda
- (Sweden) Olle Wallin

== Champions ==
=== Singles ===
- (United States) Michael Zheng def. (United States) Tyler Zink 6–4, 6–4.

=== Doubles ===
- (New Zealand) Finn Reynolds / (New Zealand) James Watt def. (United States) Benjamin Kittay / (United States) Joshua Sheehy 6–2, 6–3.
