= 2012 Tiburon Challenger =

- Date: 8–14 October
- Edition: 6th
- Surface: Hard
- Location: Tiburon, California, United States

Champions

Singles
- (United States) Jack Sock

Doubles
- (South Africa) Rik de Voest / (Australia) Chris Guccione
← 2011 ·	Tiburon Challenger	· 2013 →

The 2012 Tiburon Challenger was a professional tennis tournament played on hard courts. It was the sixth edition of the tournament which was part of the 2012 ATP Challenger Tour. It took place in Tiburon, California, United States between October 8 and October 14, 2012.

== Singles main-draw entrants ==
=== Seeds ===
Country	Player	Rank^{1}	Seed
GER	Benjamin Becker	85	1
USA	James Blake	97	2
USA	Ryan Sweeting	136	3
USA	Wayne Odesnik	137	4
ITA	Matteo Viola	146	5
USA	Tim Smyczek	153	6
USA	Denis Kudla	160	7
USA	Bobby Reynolds	162	8

- ^{1} Rankings are as of October 1, 2012.

=== Other entrants ===
The following players received wildcards into the singles main draw:

- (United States) Christian Harrison
- (United States) Bradley Klahn
- (United States) Michael McClune
- (United States) Daniel Nguyen

The following players received entry as a special exempt into the singles main draw:

- (United States) Daniel Kosakowski

The following players received entry from the qualifying draw:

- (United States) Jeff Dadamo
- (Australia) Chris Guccione
- (United States) Nicolas Meister
- (Denmark) Frederik Nielsen

== Champions ==
=== Singles ===
- (United States) Jack Sock def. (Germany) Mischa Zverev, 6–1, 1–6, 7–6^{(7–3)}

=== Doubles ===
- (South Africa) Rik de Voest / (Australia) Chris Guccione def. (Australia) Jordan Kerr / (Sweden) Andreas Siljeström, 6–1, 6–4
