= 2013 Tiburon Challenger =

- Date: 7–13 October
- Edition: 7th
- Surface: Hard
- Location: Tiburon, California, United States

Champions

Singles
- (Canada) Peter Polansky

Doubles
- (United States) Austin Krajicek / (United States) Rhyne Williams
← 2012 ·	Tiburon Challenger	· 2014 →

The 2013 Tiburon Challenger was a professional tennis tournament played on hard courts. It was the seventh edition of the tournament which was part of the 2013 ATP Challenger Tour. It took place in Tiburon, California, United States between October 7 and October 13, 2013.

== Singles main-draw entrants ==
=== Seeds ===
Country	Player	Rank^{1}	Seed
USA	Denis Kudla	95	1
USA	Tim Smyczek	100	2
AUS	Matthew Ebden	114	3
USA	Alex Kuznetsov	120	4
USA	Rajeev Ram	123	5
USA	Rhyne Williams	124	6
USA	Donald Young	125	7
USA	Bradley Klahn	133	8

- ^{1} Rankings are as of September 30, 2013.

=== Other entrants ===
The following players received wildcards into the singles main draw:

- (United States) Mitchell Frank
- (United States) Marcos Giron
- (United States) Campbell Johnson
- (United States) Daniel Nguyen

The following players received special exempt into the singles main draw:

- (United States) Jarmere Jenkins

The following players received entry from the qualifying draw:

- (Ecuador) Giovanni Lapentti
- (Canada) Philip Bester
- (Chile) Julio Peralta
- (United States) Greg Ouellette

The following players received entry from the qualifying draw as lucky losers:

- (Croatia) Marin Bradarić
- (El Salvador) Marcelo Arévalo

== Champions ==
=== Singles ===
- (Canada) Peter Polansky def. (Australia) Matthew Ebden 7–5, 6–3

=== Doubles ===
- (United States) Austin Krajicek / (United States) Rhyne Williams def. (United States) Bradley Klahn / (United States) Rajeev Ram 6–4, 6–1
