= 2019 Tiburon Challenger =

- Date: 23–29 September
- Edition: 13th
- Draw: 48S / 16D
- Surface: Hard
- Location: Tiburon, United States

Champions

Singles
- (United States) Tommy Paul

Doubles
- (United States) Robert Galloway / (Venezuela) Roberto Maytín
- Tiburon Challenger

The 2019 First Republic Tiburon Challenger was a professional tennis tournament played on outdoor hard courts. It was the thirteenth edition of the tournament which was part of the 2019 ATP Challenger Tour. It took place in Tiburon, California, United States, between September 23 and September 29, 2019.

== Singles main draw entrants ==
=== Seeds ===
| Country | Player | Rank^{1} | Seed |
|---|---|---|---|
| USA | Tommy Paul | 88 | 1 |
| USA | Denis Kudla | 107 | 2 |
| USA | Marcos Giron | 125 | 3 |
| ECU | Emilio Gómez | 166 | 4 |
| DEN | Mikael Torpegaard | 167 | 5 |
| USA | Michael Mmoh | 168 | 6 |
| BAR | Darian King | 170 | 7 |
| AUS | Thanasi Kokkinakis | 181 | 8 |
| FRA | Enzo Couacaud | 187 | 9 |
| USA | Christopher Eubanks | 190 | 10 |
| USA | Mitchell Krueger | 192 | 11 |
| CAN | Peter Polansky | 200 | 12 |
| COL | Daniel Elahi Galán | 201 | 13 |
| USA | Thai-Son Kwiatkowski | 209 | 14 |
| USA | Ernesto Escobedo | 215 | 15 |
| USA | Maxime Cressy | 228 | 16 |

- ^{1} Rankings are as of September 16, 2019.

=== Other entrants ===
The following players received wildcards into the singles main draw:

- (United States) Oliver Crawford
- (United States) Brandon Holt
- (United States) Brandon Nakashima
- (United States) Emilio Nava
- (Czech Republic) Ondřej Štyler

The following players received entry into the singles main draw using protected rankings:

- (Spain) Carlos Gómez-Herrera
- (United States) Raymond Sarmiento

The following players received entry from the qualifying draw:

- (Belgium) Michael Geerts
- (United States) Evan Zhu

== Champions ==
=== Singles ===
- (United States) Tommy Paul def. (Australia) Thanasi Kokkinakis 7–5, 6–7^{(3–7)}, 6–4.

=== Doubles ===
- (United States) Robert Galloway / (Venezuela) Roberto Maytín def. (United States) JC Aragone / (Barbados) Darian King 6–2, 7–5.
