= 2024 Tiburon Challenger =

- Date: 30 September – 6 October
- Edition: 16th
- Surface: Hard
- Location: Tiburon, United States

Champions

Singles
- (United States) Nishesh Basavareddy

Doubles
- (Australia) Luke Saville / (Australia) Tristan Schoolkate
- Tiburon Challenger

The 2024 Tiburon Challenger presented by Raymond James was a professional tennis tournament played on outdoor hardcourts. It was the 16th edition of the tournament which was part of the 2024 ATP Challenger Tour. It took place in Tiburon, United States between September 30 and October 6, 2024.

== Singles main draw entrants ==
=== Seeds ===
Country	Player	Rank^{1}	Seed
~~USA~~	~~Christopher Eubanks~~	~~114~~	~~1~~
USA	Learner Tien	151	2
USA	J. J. Wolf	169	3
AUS	Tristan Schoolkate	173	4
USA	Patrick Kypson	184	5
JOR	Abdullah Shelbayh	189	6
USA	Brandon Holt	202	7
USA	Denis Kudla	224	8
USA	Ethan Quinn	225	9

- ^{1} Rankings are as of September 23, 2024.

=== Other entrants ===
The following players received wildcards into the singles main draw:

- (United States) Kaylan Bigun
- (Denmark) Carl Emil Overbeck
- (United States) Colton Smith

The following player received entry into the singles main draw using a protected ranking:

- (Switzerland) Dominic Stricker

The following player received entry into the singles main draw as a special exempt:

- (Lithuania) Edas Butvilas

The following player received entry into the singles main draw as an alternate:

- (Netherlands) Guy den Ouden

The following players received entry from the qualifying draw:

- (United States) Ozan Baris
- (United States) Micah Braswell
- (United States) Christian Langmo
- (Colombia) Nicolás Mejía
- (United States) Govind Nanda
- Alexey Zakharov

== Champions ==
=== Singles ===
- (United States) Nishesh Basavareddy def. (United States) Eliot Spizzirri 6–1, 6–1.

=== Doubles ===
- (Australia) Luke Saville / (Australia) Tristan Schoolkate def. (United States) Patrick Kypson / (United States) Eliot Spizzirri 6–4, 6–2.
