= 2015 Tiburon Challenger =

- Date: 26 September – 04 October
- Edition: 9th
- Draw: 32S / 16D
- Prize money: $100,000
- Surface: Hard
- Location: Tiburon, United States

Champions

Singles
- (United States) Tim Smyczek

Doubles
- (Sweden) Johan Brunström / (Denmark) Frederik Nielsen
- Tiburon Challenger

The 2015 Tiburon Challenger was a professional tennis tournament played on outdoor hard courts. It was the ninth edition of the tournament which was part of the 2015 ATP Challenger Tour. It took place in Tiburon, United States between September 26 and October 4, 2015.

== Singles main draw entrants ==
=== Seeds ===
| Country | Player | Rank^{1} | Seed |
|---|---|---|---|
| USA | Denis Kudla | 76 | 1 |
| GBR | Kyle Edmund | 101 | 2 |
| USA | Tim Smyczek | 106 | 3 |
| GER | Dustin Brown | 107 | 4 |
| USA | Ryan Harrison | 116 | 5 |
| USA | Bjorn Fratangelo | 139 | 6 |
| SLO | Blaž Rola | 139 | 7 |
| USA | Jared Donaldson | 143 | 8 |

- ^{1} Rankings are as of September 21, 2015.

=== Other entrants ===
The following players received wildcards into the singles main draw:

- (Sweden) André Göransson
- (United States) Chase Buchanan
- (United States) Deiton Baughman
- (United States) Mackenzie McDonald

The following players received entry into the singles main draw courtesy of a protected ranking:

- (Canada) Peter Polansky

The following players received entry into the singles main draw as a special exempt:

- (United States) Alex Kuznetsov

The following players received entry into the singles main draw as an alternate:

- (Bulgaria) Dimitar Kutrovsky

The following players received entry from the qualifying draw:

- (United States) Dennis Nevolo
- (Switzerland) Henri Laaksonen
- (United States) Nicolas Meister
- (United States) Sekou Bangoura

== Champions ==
=== Singles ===
- (United States) Tim Smyczek def. (United States) Denis Kudla, 1–6, 6–1, 7–6^{(9–7)}.

=== Doubles ===
- (Sweden) Johan Brunström / (Denmark) Frederik Nielsen def. (Australia) Carsten Ball / (Australia) Matt Reid, 7–6^{(7–2)}, 6–2.
