= 2013 Tiburon Challenger – Singles =

Singles
- 2013 Tiburon Challenger

Final
- Champion: (Canada) Peter Polansky
- Runner-up: (Australia) Matthew Ebden
- Score: 7–5, 6–3

Events
Singles	Doubles
- Tiburon Challenger

Jack Sock was the defending champion but decided to participate at the 2013 Shanghai Rolex Masters instead. Peter Polansky won the title over 3rd seed Matthew Ebden 7–5, 6–3 to win his first Challenger title.

== Seeds ==
1. (United States) Denis Kudla (semifinals)
2. (United States) Tim Smyczek (semifinals)
3. (Australia) Matthew Ebden (final)
4. (United States) Alex Kuznetsov (first round)
5. (United States) Rajeev Ram (second round)
6. (United States) Rhyne Williams (second round)
7. (United States) Donald Young (quarterfinals)
8. (United States) Bradley Klahn (second round)

== Draw ==
Key

- Q = Qualifier
- WC = Wild card
- LL = Lucky loser
- Alt = Alternate
- ITF = ITF entry
- PR = Protected ranking
- SR = Special ranking
- SE = Special exempt
- JE = Junior exempt
- JR = Junior Accelerator Programme entrant
- CO = College Accelerator Programme entrant
- NG = Next Gen Accelerator Program entrant
- w/o = Walkover
- r = Retired
- d = Defaulted

=== Finals ===
Semifinals
1	(United States) Denis Kudla	5	3
3	(Australia) Matthew Ebden	7	6
(Canada) Peter Polansky	6	7^{7}
2	(United States) Tim Smyczek	4	6^{4}

Final
3	(Australia) Matthew Ebden	5	3
(Canada) Peter Polansky	7	6

=== Top half ===
First round
1	(United States) D Kudla	6	6
LL	(Croatia) Marin Bradarić	1	0
(United States) A Krajicek	6	7
(Republic of Ireland) J McGee	3	6^{3}
(United States) S Johnson	6^{6}	6	4
(Australia) J-P Smith	7^{7}	2	6
WC	(United States) D Nguyen	2	6	3
5	(United States) R Ram	6	4	6
3	(Australia) M Ebden	6	6
(Canada) F Peliwo	3	3
WC	(United States) M Giron	6^{2}	7^{7}	6
(Australia) S Groth	7^{7}	6^{1}	3
Q	(Ecuador) G Lapentti	3	3
(Australia) B Mitchell	6	6
LL	(El Salvador) M Arévalo	0	4
6	(United States) R Williams	6	6

Second round
1	(United States) D Kudla	6	6
(United States) A Krajicek	0	1
(Australia) J-P Smith	7^{7}	6
5	(United States) R Ram	6^{2}	4
3	(Australia) M Ebden	4	6	6
WC	(United States) M Giron	6	1	3
(Australia) B Mitchell	6	6^{4}	7^{7}
6	(United States) R Williams	3	7^{7}	6^{1}

Quarterfinals
1	(United States) D Kudla	6	7
(Australia) J-P Smith	4	5
3	(Australia) M Ebden	6	7^{7}
(Australia) B Mitchell	4	6^{3}

Semifinals
1	(United States) D Kudla	5	3
3	(Australia) M Ebden	7	6

=== Bottom half ===
First round
8	(United States) B Klahn	7	6
Q	(Canada) P Bester	5	3
Q	(Chile) J Peralta	5	4
(United States) T Sandgren	7	6
(Canada) P Polansky	6	7
WC	(United States) Campbell Johnson	4	5
SE	(United States) J Jenkins	6^{5}	7	6
4	(United States) A Kuznetsov	7^{7}	5	3
7	(United States) D Young	2	6	6
Q	(United States) G Ouellette	6	3	1
(Germany) P Gojowczyk	6	6
(United Kingdom) D Evans	4	4
(Ukraine) D Molchanov	6	2	7
(Italy) S Caruso	4	6	6^{7}
(Australia) M Reid	1	1
2	(United States) T Smyczek	6	6

Second round
8	(United States) B Klahn	1	6^{7}
(United States) T Sandgren	6	7^{9}
(Canada) P Polansky	6	7
SE	(United States) J Jenkins	4	5
7	(United States) D Young	6	6
(Germany) P Gojowczyk	3	1
(Ukraine) D Molchanov	6	4	3
2	(United States) T Smyczek	3	6	6

Quarterfinals
(United States) T Sandgren	4	3
(Canada) P Polansky	6	6
7	(United States) D Young	4	6	4
2	(United States) T Smyczek	6	4	6

Semifinals
(Canada) P Polansky	6	7^{7}
2	(United States) T Smyczek	4	6^{4}
