= 2017 Tiburon Challenger =

- Date: 25 September – 1 October
- Edition: 11th
- Draw: 32S / 16D
- Surface: Hard
- Location: Tiburon, United States

Champions

Singles
- (United Kingdom) Cameron Norrie

Doubles
- (Sweden) André Göransson / (France) Florian Lakat
- Tiburon Challenger

The 2017 Tiburon Challenger was a professional tennis tournament played on outdoor hard courts. It was the eleventh edition of the tournament which was part of the 2017 ATP Challenger Tour. It took place in Tiburon, United States between September 25 and October 1, 2017.

== Singles main draw entrants ==
=== Seeds ===
Country	Player	Rank^{1}	Seed
BEL	Ruben Bemelmans	92	1
USA	Tennys Sandgren	100	2
FRA	Quentin Halys	126	3
USA	Michael Mmoh	142	4
IND	Ramkumar Ramanathan	153	5
BAR	Darian King	159	6
CAN	Félix Auger-Aliassime	161	7
GBR	Cameron Norrie	164	8

- ^{1} Rankings are as of September 18, 2017.

=== Other entrants ===
The following players received wildcards into the singles main draw:

- (United States) Tom Fawcett
- (United States) Christian Harrison
- (South Africa) Wayne Montgomery
- (United States) Alexander Sarkissian

The following players received entry into the singles main draw as special exempts:

- (Canada) Frank Dancevic
- (United Kingdom) Alexander Ward

The following player received entry into the singles main draw using a protected ranking:

- (Colombia) Alejandro González

The following players received entry from the qualifying draw:

- (United States) Sekou Bangoura
- (United States) Deiton Baughman
- (United States) Evan King
- (Japan) Kaichi Uchida

The following players received entry as lucky losers:

- (Germany) Jan Choinski
- (Canada) Filip Peliwo
- (United States) Tim Smyczek

== Champions ==
=== Singles ===
- (United Kingdom) Cameron Norrie def. (United States) Tennys Sandgren 6–2, 6–3.

=== Doubles ===
- (Sweden) André Göransson / (France) Florian Lakat def. (El Salvador) Marcelo Arévalo / (Mexico) Miguel Ángel Reyes-Varela 6–4, 6–4.
