= Florian Lakat =

French tennis player (born 1995)

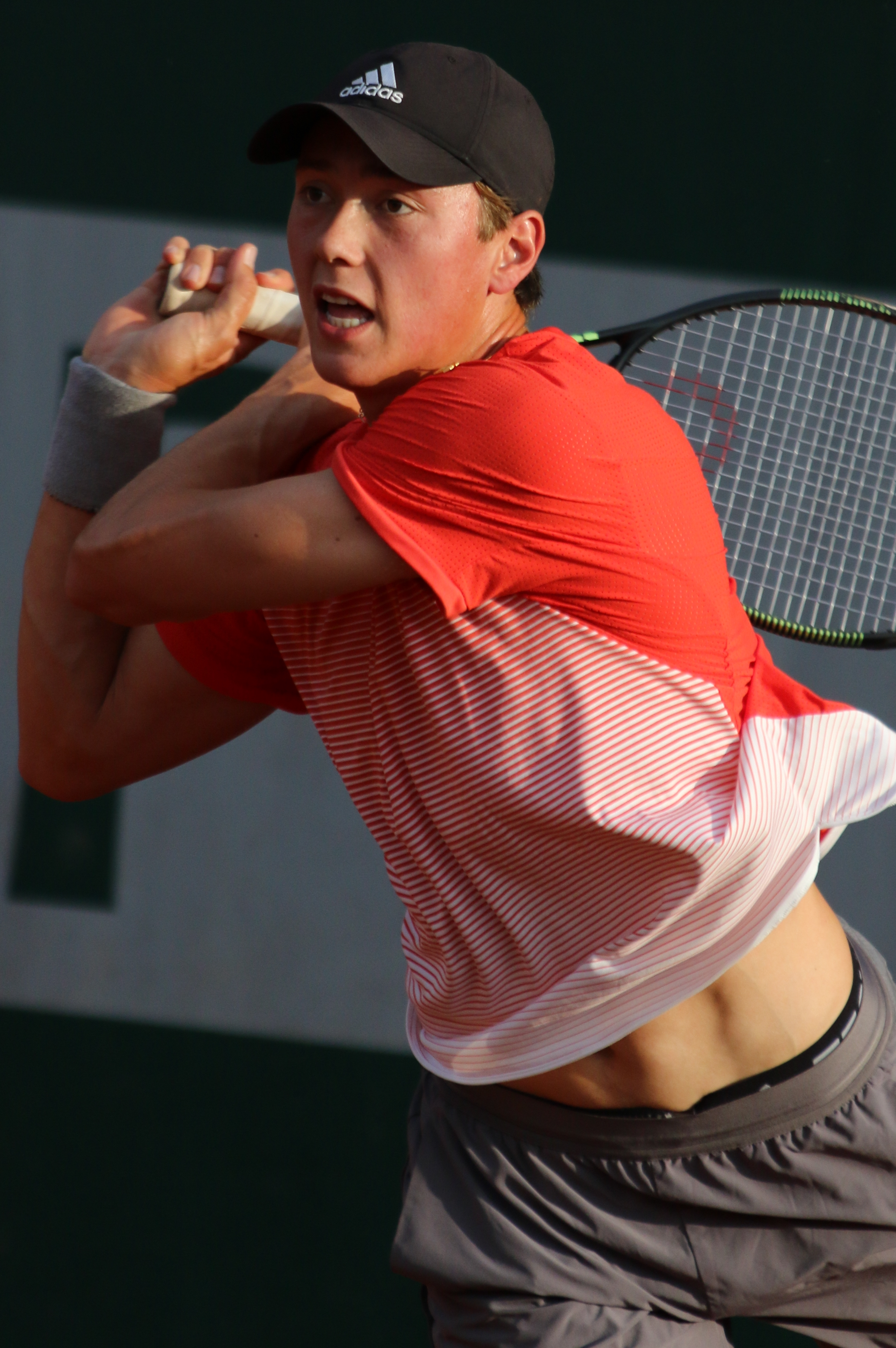
- Lakat at the 2018 French Open
- Country (sports): France
- Born: 12 November 1995 (age 30) Paris, France
- Height: 1.96 m (6 ft 5 in)
- Plays: Right-handed (two-handed backhand)
- College: Mississippi State; California
- Prize money: $43,390

Singles
- Career record: 0–0
- Career titles: 0; 0 Challenger, 0 Futures
- Highest ranking: No. 680 (19 March 2018)

Doubles
- Career record: 0–1
- Career titles: 0; 1 Challenger, 6 Futures
- Highest ranking: No. 252 (16 April 2018)

Florian Lakat (born 12 November 1995) is a French tennis player.

Lakat has a career high ATP singles ranking of No. 680 achieved on 19 March 2018 and a high career doubles ranking of No. 252 achieved on 16 April 2018.

Lakat has won 1 ATP Challenger doubles title at the 2017 Tiburon Challenger.

Lakat played college tennis at Mississippi State University and the University of California, Berkeley.

== Tour titles ==
Legend
Grand Slam (0)
ATP Masters Series (0)
ATP Tour (0)
Challengers (1)

=== Doubles ===
Result	Date	Tournament	Tier	Surface	Partner	Opponents	Score
Win	Oct 2017	Tiburon, United States	Challenger	Hard	(Sweden) André Göransson	(El Salvador) Marcelo Arévalo (Mexico) Miguel Ángel Reyes-Varela	6–4, 6–4
