= Deiton Baughman =

American tennis player

- Country (sports): United States
- Born: 23 April 1996 (age 30)
- Plays: Right-handed (two handed-backhand)
- Prize money: $67,479

Singles
- Career record: 0–0 (at ATP Tour level, Grand Slam level, and in Davis Cup)
- Career titles: 0
- Highest ranking: No. 341 (October 26, 2015)

Doubles
- Career record: 0–2 (at ATP Tour level, Grand Slam level, and in Davis Cup)
- Career titles: 0
- Highest ranking: No. 319 (April 11, 2016)

Grand Slam doubles results
- US Open: 1R (2015)
- Last updated on: July 15, 2024.

Deiton Baughman (born April 23, 1996) is an American former tennis player.

Baughman has a career high ATP singles ranking of 341 achieved on October 26, 2015. He also has a career high ATP doubles ranking of 354 achieved on October 26, 2015.

Baughman made his ATP main draw debut at the 2014 Sony Open Tennis in the doubles event partnering Martin Redlicki. The pair were given a wildcard and lost in the first round to Ryan Harrison and Jack Sock.

At the 2015 US Open, Baughman made his grand slam main draw debut in the doubles event, where he was given a wildcard with Tommy Paul.

Baughman is known for his creative, "stream-of-consciousness" outbursts during matches.
