= Tiburon Challenger =

- 2025 Tiburon Challenger

ATP Challenger Tour
- Location: Tiburon, California, United States
- Venue: Tiburon Peninsula Club
- Category: ATP Challenger 125 (2026-)
- Surface: Hard
- Draw: 32S/17Q/16D
- Prize money: $100,000+H
- Website: Website

The Tiburon Challenger presented by Raymond James is a professional tennis tournament played on outdoor hardcourts. It is currently part of the ATP Challenger Tour 125. It has been held annually at the Tiburon Peninsula Club in Tiburon, California, United States, since 2003. In 2026 it was upgraded to an ATP Challenger 125.

== Past finals ==
=== Singles ===
Year	Champion	Runner-up	Score
2026	(United States) Darwin Blanch	(United States) Michael Mmoh	3–6, 6–4, 6–2
2025	(United States) Michael Zheng	(United States) Tyler Zink	6–4, 6–4
2024	(United States) Nishesh Basavareddy	(United States) Eliot Spizzirri	6–1, 6–1
2023	(United States) Zachary Svajda	(Australia) Adam Walton	6–2, 6–2
2022	(United States) Zachary Svajda	(United States) Ben Shelton	2–6, 6–2, 6–4
2020–2021	Not held		
2019	(United States) Tommy Paul	(Australia) Thanasi Kokkinakis	7–5, 6–7^{(3–7)}, 6–4
2018	(United States) Michael Mmoh	(Spain) Marcel Granollers	6–3, 7–5
2017	(United Kingdom) Cameron Norrie	(United States) Tennys Sandgren	6–2, 6–3
2016	(Barbados) Darian King	(United States) Michael Mmoh	7–6^{(7–2)}, 6–2
2015	(United States) Tim Smyczek	(United States) Denis Kudla	1–6, 6–1, 7–6^{(9–7)}
2014	(United States) Sam Querrey	(Australia) John Millman	6–4, 6–2
2013	(Canada) Peter Polansky	(Australia) Matthew Ebden	7–5, 6–3
2012	(United States) Jack Sock	(Germany) Mischa Zverev	6–1, 1–6, 7–6^{(7–3)}
2011	(Croatia) Ivo Karlović	(United States) Sam Querrey	6–7^{(2–7)}, 6–1, 6–4
2010	(Germany) Tobias Kamke	(United States) Ryan Harrison	6–1, 6–1
2009	(Japan) Go Soeda	(Serbia) Ilija Bozoljac	3–6, 6–3, 6–2
2005–2008	Not Held		
2004	(United States) K. J. Hippensteel	(United States) Kevin Kim	6–3, 6–3
2003	(United States) Alex Bogomolov Jr.	(United States) Jeff Morrison	7–6(4), 6–3

=== Doubles ===
Year	Champions	Runners-up	Score
2026	(Mexico) Hans Hach Verdugo (United States) JJ Tracy	(United States) Nathaniel Lammons (United States) Jackson Withrow	7–6^{(9–7)}, 6–4
2025	(New Zealand) Finn Reynolds (New Zealand) James Watt	(United States) Benjamin Kittay (United States) Joshua Sheehy	6–2, 6–3
2024	(Australia) Luke Saville (Australia) Tristan Schoolkate	(United States) Patrick Kypson (United States) Eliot Spizzirri	6–4, 6–2
2023	(United Kingdom) Luke Johnson (Tunisia) Skander Mansouri	(United States) William Blumberg (Venezuela) Luis David Martínez	6–2, 6–3
2022	(Switzerland) Leandro Riedi (Monaco) Valentin Vacherot	(United States) Ezekiel Clark (United States) Alfredo Perez	6–7^{(2–7)}, 6–3, [10–2]
2020–2021	Not held		
2019	(United States) Robert Galloway (Venezuela) Roberto Maytín	(United States) JC Aragone (Barbados) Darian King	6–2, 7–5
2018	(Mexico) Hans Hach Verdugo (Australia) Luke Saville	(Spain) Gerard Granollers (Spain) Pedro Martínez	6–3, 6–2
2017	(Sweden) André Göransson (France) Florian Lakat	(El Salvador) Marcelo Arévalo (Mexico) Miguel Ángel Reyes-Varela	6–4, 6–4
2016	(Australia) Matt Reid (Australia) John-Patrick Smith	(France) Quentin Halys (United States) Dennis Novikov	6–1, 6–2
2015	(Sweden) Johan Brunström (Denmark) Frederik Nielsen	(Australia) Carsten Ball (Australia) Matt Reid	7–6^{(7–2)}, 6–1
2014	(United States) Bradley Klahn (Canada) Adil Shamasdin	(Australia) Carsten Ball (Australia) Matt Reid	7–5, 6–2
2013	(United States) Austin Krajicek (United States) Rhyne Williams	(United States) Rhyne Williams (United States) Rajeev Ram	6–4, 6–1
2012	(South Africa) Rik de Voest (Australia) Chris Guccione	(Australia) Jordan Kerr (Sweden) Andreas Siljeström	6–1, 6–4
2011	(Australia) Carsten Ball (Australia) Chris Guccione	(United States) Steve Johnson (United States) Sam Querrey	6–1, 5–7, [10–6]
2010	(United States) Robert Kendrick (United States) Travis Rettenmaier	(United States) Ryler DeHeart (Canada) Pierre-Ludovic Duclos	6–1, 6–4
2009	(Philippines) Treat Conrad Huey (India) Harsh Mankad	(Serbia) Ilija Bozoljac (Serbia) Dušan Vemić	6–4, 6–4
2005–2008	Not held		
2004	(Brazil) André Sá (Brazil) Bruno Soares	(United States) Brandon Coupe (United States) Robert Kendrick	6–2, 6–3
2003	(United States) Brandon Coupe (United States) Justin Gimelstob	(United States) Diego Ayala (United States) Robert Kendrick	0–6, 6–3, 7–6(3)
