= 2000 Davis Cup Europe/Africa Zone Group II =

International tennis competition

The Europe/Africa Zone was one of the three zones of the regional Davis Cup competition in 2000.

In the Europe/Africa Zone there were four different tiers, called groups, in which teams competed against each other to advance to the upper tier. Winners in Group II advanced to the Europe/Africa Zone Group I. Teams who lost their respective ties competed in the relegation play-offs, with winning teams remaining in Group II, whereas teams who lost their play-offs were relegated to the Europe/Africa Zone Group III in 2001.

== Participating nations ==
- Bulgaria
- Croatia
- Denmark
- Egypt
- Estonia
- Greece
- Ireland
- Israel
- Ivory Coast
- Latvia
- Lithuania
- Luxembourg
- Norway
- Poland
- Slovenia
- Turkey

=== Draw ===
Relegation Play-offs
Mondorf-les-Bains, Luxembourg (clay)
Latvia	1
Luxembourg	4
İzmir, Turkey (hard)
Turkey	4
Lithuania	1
Tallinn, Estonia (indoor carpet)
Egypt	0
Estonia	5
Sofia, Bulgaria (clay)
Bulgaria	2
Israel	3

First Round
Jūrmala, Latvia (indoor carpet)
Croatia	5
Latvia	0
Mondorf-les-Bains, Luxembourg (clay)
Luxembourg	2
Ireland	3
Istanbul, Turkey (hard)
Denmark	3
Turkey	2
Šiauliai, Lithuania (indoor carpet)
Ivory Coast	3
Lithuania	2
Cairo, Egypt (clay)
Egypt	2
Slovenia	3
Bytom, Poland (clay)
Estonia	1
Poland	4
Sofia, Bulgaria (clay)
Greece	3
Bulgaria	2
Oslo, Norway (clay)
Norway	3
Israel	2

Second Round
Dublin, Ireland (carpet)
Croatia	5
Ireland	0
Rungsted, Denmark (clay)
Denmark	2
Ivory Coast	3
Szczecin, Poland (clay)
Slovenia	3
Poland	2
Athens, Greece (clay)
Greece	4
Norway	1

Third Round
Rijeka, Croatia (indoor carpet)
Croatia	5
Ivory Coast	0
Athens, Greece (clay)
Slovenia	4
Greece	1

- Latvia, Lithuania, Egypt, and Bulgaria relegated to Group III in 2001.
- Croatia and Slovenia promoted to Group I in 2001.

== First round ==
=== Latvia vs. Croatia ===
Latvia
0
National Centre, Jūrmala, Latvia
28–30 April 2000
Carpet (indoors)

Croatia
5

			1	2	3	4	5
1	(Latvia) (Croatia)	Ģirts Dzelde; Goran Ivanišević	1; 6	4; 6	4; 6
2	(Latvia) (Croatia)	Andris Fiļimonovs; Ivan Ljubičić	6^{0} 7^{7}	6^{6} 7^{8}	4; 6
3	(Latvia) (Croatia)	Ģirts Dzelde / Andris Fiļimonovs; Goran Ivanišević / Ivan Ljubičić	4; 6	6; 3	3; 6	2; 6
4	(Latvia) (Croatia)	Raimonds Sproga; Mario Ančić	3; 6	4; 6
5	(Latvia) (Croatia)	Ivo Lagzdiņš; Lovro Zovko	3; 6	4; 6

=== Luxembourg vs. Ireland ===
Luxembourg
2
Mondorf Tennis Club, Mondorf-les-Bains, Luxembourg
28–30 April 2000
Clay

Ireland
3

			1	2	3	4	5
1	(Luxembourg) (Republic of Ireland)	Mike Scheidweiler; Scott Barron	3; 6	4; 6	4; 6
2	(Luxembourg) (Republic of Ireland)	Gilles Müller; Peter Clarke	6; 4	7; 5	7; 5
3	(Luxembourg) (Republic of Ireland)	Johny Goudenbour / Mike Scheidweiler; Scott Barron / Owen Casey	3; 6	3; 6	4; 6
4	(Luxembourg) (Republic of Ireland)	Mike Scheidweiler; Peter Clarke	4; 6	7; 5	6; 3	5; 7	2; 6
5	(Luxembourg) (Republic of Ireland)	Gilles Müller; Sean Cooper	6; 2	2; 6	6; 3

=== Turkey vs. Denmark ===
Turkey
2
T.E.D. Club, Istanbul, Turkey
28–30 April 2000
Hard

Denmark
3

			1	2	3	4	5
1	(Turkey) (Denmark)	Erhan Oral; Frederik Fetterlein	3; 6	4; 6	0; 6
2	(Turkey) (Denmark)	Efe Üstündağ; Kristian Pless	3; 6	6^{5} 7^{7}	1; 6
3	(Turkey) (Denmark)	Mustafa Azkara / Erhan Oral; Kristian Pless / Jonathan Printzlau	6; 4	7^{7} 6^{4}	6; 3
4	(Turkey) (Denmark)	Erhan Oral; Kristian Pless	2; 6	1; 6	4; 6
5	(Turkey) (Denmark)	Barış Ergün; Bob Borella	6^{5} 7^{7}	6; 3				retired

=== Lithuania vs. Ivory Coast ===
Lithuania
2
Šiauliai Tennis Club, Šiauliai, Lithuania
28–30 April 2000
Carpet (indoors)

Ivory Coast
3

			1	2	3	4	5
1	(Lithuania) (Ivory Coast)	Aivaras Balžekas; Claude N'Goran	3; 6	2; 6	2; 6
2	(Lithuania) (Ivory Coast)	Rolandas Muraška; Valentin Sanon	7^{7} 6^{4}	7; 5	6; 3
3	(Lithuania) (Ivory Coast)	Paulius Jurkėnas / Rolandas Muraška; Ilou Lonfo / Claude N'Goran	2; 6	7^{7} 6^{5}	3; 6	4; 6
4	(Lithuania) (Ivory Coast)	Aivaras Balžekas; Valentin Sanon	7; 5	6; 3	6; 4
5	(Lithuania) (Ivory Coast)	Rolandas Muraška; Claude N'Goran	6^{3} 7^{7}	6; 4	3; 6	4; 6

=== Egypt vs. Slovenia ===
Egypt
2
Gezira Sporting Club, Cairo, Egypt
28–30 April 2000
Clay

Slovenia
3

			1	2	3	4	5
1	(Egypt) (Slovenia)	Karim Maamoun; Marko Tkalec	3; 6	7^{7} 6^{5}	7^{7} 6^{2}	6^{5} 7^{7}	6; 4
2	(Egypt) (Slovenia)	Amr Ghoneim; Andrej Kračman	6; 4	5; 7	6; 4	6^{6} 7^{8}	6; 8
3	(Egypt) (Slovenia)	Amr Ghoneim / Karim Maamoun; Andrej Kračman / Marko Tkalec	1; 6	3; 6	1; 6
4	(Egypt) (Slovenia)	Amr Ghoneim; Marko Tkalec	7^{7} 6^{1}	0; 6	7; 5	2; 6	4; 6
5	(Egypt) (Slovenia)	Karim Maamoun; Miha Gregorc	3; 6	6; 3	6; 4

=== Poland vs. Estonia ===
Poland
4
Górnik Tennis Club, Bytom, Poland
28–30 April 2000
Clay

Estonia
1

			1	2	3	4	5
1	(Poland) (Estonia)	Bartłomiej Dąbrowski; Rene Busch	6^{5} 7^{7}	6; 2	4; 6	0; 6
2	(Poland) (Estonia)	Krystian Pfeiffer; Mait Künnap	6; 3	6^{6} 7^{8}	6; 2	6^{5} 7^{7}	6; 1
3	(Poland) (Estonia)	Marcin Matkowski / Radosław Nijaki; Mait Künnap / Alti Vahkal	6; 2	7^{10} 6^{8}	6^{5} 7^{7}	6; 4
4	(Poland) (Estonia)	Bartłomiej Dąbrowski; Alti Vahkal	6; 2	6; 3	6; 0
5	(Poland) (Estonia)	Marcin Matkowski; Rene Busch	6; 2	3; 6	6; 1

=== Bulgaria vs. Greece ===
Bulgaria
2
Levski Tennis Club, Sofia, Bulgaria
28–30 April 2000
Clay

Greece
3

			1	2	3	4	5
1	(Bulgaria) (Greece)	Ivaylo Traykov; Solon Peppas	6; 1	6; 3	7^{7} 6^{2}
2	(Bulgaria) (Greece)	Orlin Stanoytchev; Vasilis Mazarakis	6; 2	1; 6	6; 3	6; 2
3	(Bulgaria) (Greece)	Orlin Stanoytchev / Ivaylo Traykov; Konstantinos Economidis / Anastasios Vasiliadis	6; 3	6^{1} 7^{7}	4; 6	6^{5} 7^{7}
4	(Bulgaria) (Greece)	Orlin Stanoytchev; Solon Peppas	1; 6	6; 3	1; 6	2; 6
5	(Bulgaria) (Greece)	Milen Velev; Vasilis Mazarakis	6^{5} 7^{7}	2; 6	0; 6

=== Norway vs. Israel ===
Norway
3
Oslo Tennis Club, Oslo, Norway
28–30 April 2000
Clay

Israel
2

			1	2	3	4	5
1	(Norway) (Israel)	Christian Ruud; Eyal Ran	6; 2	6; 2	7; 5
2	(Norway) (Israel)	Jan Frode Andersen; Harel Levy	6^{6} 7^{8}	3; 6	4; 6
3	(Norway) (Israel)	Helge Koll-Frafjord / Christian Ruud; Noam Behr / Andy Ram	6; 4	1; 6	6; 2	7^{7} 6^{5}
4	(Norway) (Israel)	Christian Ruud; Harel Levy	6; 4	6^{5} 7^{7}	2; 6	7^{7} 6^{4}	1; 6
5	(Norway) (Israel)	Jan Frode Andersen; Andy Ram	6; 4	6; 1	7; 5

== Second round ==
=== Ireland vs. Croatia ===
Ireland
0
Fitzwilliam Lawn Tennis Club, Dublin, Ireland
14–16 July 2000
Carpet

Croatia
5

			1	2	3	4	5
1	(Republic of Ireland) (Croatia)	Owen Casey; Goran Ivanišević	5; 7	6; 4	2; 6	2; 6
2	(Republic of Ireland) (Croatia)	Scott Barron; Mario Ančić	6; 4	1; 6	4; 6	4; 6
3	(Republic of Ireland) (Croatia)	Scott Barron / Owen Casey; Goran Ivanišević / Ivo Karlović	7^{7} 6^{5}	2; 6	1; 6	1; 6
4	(Republic of Ireland) (Croatia)	Conor Niland; Ivo Karlović	6; 4	3; 6	4; 6
5	(Republic of Ireland) (Croatia)	Owen Casey; Lovro Zovko	6; 1	4; 6	6^{3} 7^{7}

=== Denmark vs. Ivory Coast ===
Denmark
2
Rungsted Tennis Club, Rungsted, Denmark
21–23 July 2000
Clay

Ivory Coast
3

			1	2	3	4	5
1	(Denmark) (Ivory Coast)	Kristian Pless; Claude N'Goran	6^{4} 7^{7}	2; 6	3; 6
2	(Denmark) (Ivory Coast)	Frederik Fetterlein; Valentin Sanon	0; 6	6; 4	2; 6	3; 6
3	(Denmark) (Ivory Coast)	Frederik Fetterlein / Kristian Pless; Ilou Lonfo / Claude N'Goran	4; 6	6; 1	2; 6	3; 6
4	(Denmark) (Ivory Coast)	Patrik Langvardt; Valentin Sanon	7; 5	6; 0
5	(Denmark) (Ivory Coast)	Bob Borella; Ilou Lonfo	6; 2	6; 3

=== Poland vs. Slovenia ===
Poland
2
Szczecin Tennis Club, Szczecin, Poland
21–23 July 2000
Clay

Slovenia
3

			1	2	3	4	5
1	(Poland) (Slovenia)	Bartłomiej Dąbrowski; Marko Tkalec	1; 6	6^{3} 7^{7}	6^{1} 7^{7}
2	(Poland) (Slovenia)	Krystian Pfeiffer; Andrej Kračman	6; 3	6; 2	4; 6	3; 6	6; 3
3	(Poland) (Slovenia)	Krzysztof Kwinta / Marcin Matkowski; Andrej Kračman / Marko Tkalec	6; 4	6; 4	7^{7} 6^{3}
4	(Poland) (Slovenia)	Krystian Pfeiffer; Marko Tkalec	5; 7	4; 6	4; 6
5	(Poland) (Slovenia)	Bartłomiej Dąbrowski; Andrej Kračman	2; 6	6; 4	6^{5} 7^{7}	2; 6

=== Greece vs. Norway ===
Greece
4
Athens Lawn Tennis Club, Athens, Greece
21–23 July 2000
Clay

Norway
1

			1	2	3	4	5
1	(Greece) (Norway)	Solon Peppas; Helge Koll-Frafjord	6; 4	6; 4	6; 3
2	(Greece) (Norway)	Vasilis Mazarakis; Jan Frode Andersen	3; 6	4; 6	7^{7} 6^{5}	6; 2	4; 6
3	(Greece) (Norway)	Konstantinos Economidis / Anastasios Vasiliadis; Stian Boretti / Helge Koll-Frafjord	6; 3	6; 1	6; 2
4	(Greece) (Norway)	Solon Peppas; Jan Frode Andersen	7; 5	6; 2	6; 2
5	(Greece) (Norway)	Konstantinos Economidis; Stian Boretti	6; 3	6; 0

== Relegation play-offs ==
=== Luxembourg vs. Latvia ===
Luxembourg
4
Mondorf Tennis Club, Mondorf-les-Bains, Luxembourg
21–23 July 2000
Clay

Latvia
1

			1	2	3	4	5
1	(Luxembourg) (Latvia)	Gilles Müller; Ģirts Dzelde	6; 2	6; 0	6; 2
2	(Luxembourg) (Latvia)	Pascal Schaul; Andris Fiļimonovs	6; 4	2; 6	7^{8} 6^{6}	7^{7} 6^{3}
3	(Luxembourg) (Latvia)	Johny Goudenbour / Gilles Müller; Ģirts Dzelde / Andris Fiļimonovs	6; 3	6; 3	6^{9} 7^{11}	7; 5
4	(Luxembourg) (Latvia)	Sacha Thoma; Raimonds Sproga	2; 6	5; 7
5	(Luxembourg) (Latvia)	Pascal Schaul; Ivo Lagzdiņš	6; 3	5; 7	6; 2

=== Turkey vs. Lithuania ===
Turkey
4
Culture Park Tennis Club, İzmir, Turkey
21–23 July 2000
Hard

Lithuania
1

			1	2	3	4	5
1	(Turkey) (Lithuania)	Efe Üstündağ; Rolandas Muraška	5; 7	0; 6	4; 6
2	(Turkey) (Lithuania)	Mustafa Azkara; Aivaras Balžekas	4; 6	6^{5} 7^{7}	6; 4	6; 2	9; 7
3	(Turkey) (Lithuania)	Mustafa Azkara / Erhan Oral; Paulius Jurkėnas / Rolandas Muraška	6; 4	6; 3	6; 1
4	(Turkey) (Lithuania)	Efe Üstündağ; Aivaras Balžekas	4; 6	6; 1	6; 3	6; 4
5	(Turkey) (Lithuania)	Barış Ergün; Rolandas Muraška	3; 6	6; 4	7^{9} 6^{7}

=== Estonia vs. Egypt ===
Estonia
5
Kalev Sports Hall, Tallinn, Estonia
21–23 July 2000
Carpet (indoors)

Egypt
0

			1	2	3	4	5
1	(Estonia) (Egypt)	Gert Vilms; Karim Maamoun	7^{7} 6^{3}	6; 2	6; 4
2	(Estonia) (Egypt)	Andrei Luzgin; Hisham Hemeda	6^{7} 7^{9}	7; 5	6; 2	6; 2
3	(Estonia) (Egypt)	Mait Künnap / Alti Vahkal; Hisham Hemeda / Marwan Zewar	7^{7} 6^{3}	6; 2	6; 4
4	(Estonia) (Egypt)	Andrei Luzgin; Karim Maamoun	6; 4	7^{7} 6^{5}
5	(Estonia) (Egypt)	Mait Künnap; Marwan Zewar	3; 6	6; 4	6; 3

=== Bulgaria vs. Israel ===
Bulgaria
2
Levski Tennis Club, Sofia, Bulgaria
21–23 July 2000
Clay

Israel
3

			1	2	3	4	5
1	(Bulgaria) (Israel)	Milen Velev; Harel Levy	1; 6	3; 6	2; 6
2	(Bulgaria) (Israel)	Ivaylo Traykov; Lior Mor	7^{7} 6^{4}	4; 6	6; 4	6; 4
3	(Bulgaria) (Israel)	Todor Enev / Radoslav Lukaev; Jonathan Erlich / Harel Levy	6; 4	7; 5	7^{7} 6^{5}
4	(Bulgaria) (Israel)	Ivaylo Traykov; Harel Levy	7^{7} 6^{5}	6^{8} 7^{10}	6^{3} 7^{7}	6^{6} 7^{8}
5	(Bulgaria) (Israel)	Todor Enev; Lior Mor	3; 6	3; 6	5; 7

== Third round ==
=== Croatia vs. Ivory Coast ===
Croatia
5
Mladost Trsat Hall, Rijeka, Croatia
6–8 October 2000
Carpet (indoors)

Ivory Coast
0

			1	2	3	4	5
1	(Croatia) (Ivory Coast)	Goran Ivanišević; Claude N'Goran	6; 4	6; 4	6; 3
2	(Croatia) (Ivory Coast)	Ivan Ljubičić; Valentin Sanon	6; 3	7^{8} 6^{6}	6; 3
3	(Croatia) (Ivory Coast)	Goran Ivanišević / Ivo Karlović; Ilou Lonfo / Claude N'Goran	7^{8} 6^{6}	6; 4	6^{5} 7^{7}	4; 6	6; 0
4	(Croatia) (Ivory Coast)	Mario Ančić; Valentin Sanon	7; 5	6; 2
5	(Croatia) (Ivory Coast)	Ivo Karlović; Claude N'Goran	6; 4	6; 1

=== Greece vs. Slovenia ===
Greece
1
Athens Lawn Tennis Club, Athens, Greece
6–8 October 2000
Clay

Slovenia
4

			1	2	3	4	5
1	(Greece) (Slovenia)	Nikos Rovas; Marko Tkalec	2; 6	3; 6	6; 2	1; 6
2	(Greece) (Slovenia)	Solon Peppas; Andrej Kračman	6; 4	6; 4	6; 4
3	(Greece) (Slovenia)	Konstantinos Economidis / Anastasios Vasiliadis; Andrej Kračman / Borut Urh	6; 2	4; 6	5; 7	3; 6
4	(Greece) (Slovenia)	Solon Peppas; Marko Tkalec	5; 7	2; 6	6^{2} 7^{7}
5	(Greece) (Slovenia)	Konstantinos Economidis; Andrej Kračman	3; 6	6; 2	3; 6
