= 1997 Davis Cup Europe/Africa Zone Group II =

Zone of the Davis Cup tournament

The Europe/Africa Zone was one of the three zones of the regional Davis Cup competition in 1997.

In the Europe/Africa Zone there were four different tiers, called groups, in which teams competed against each other to advance to the upper tier. Winners in Group II advanced to the Europe/Africa Zone Group I. Teams who lost their respective ties competed in the relegation play-offs, with winning teams remaining in Group II, whereas teams who lost their play-offs were relegated to the Europe/Africa Zone Group III in 1998.

== Participating nations ==
- Belarus
- Egypt
- Finland
- Georgia
- Ghana
- Greece
- Ireland
- Ivory Coast
- Latvia
- Lithuania
- Nigeria
- Norway
- Poland
- Portugal
- Slovenia
- Yugoslavia

=== Draw ===
Relegation Play-offs
Tbilisi, Georgia (clay)
Nigeria	0
Georgia	5
Cairo, Egypt (clay)
Egypt	3
Lithuania	2
Jūrmala, Latvia (clay)
Latvia	4
Ghana	1
Dublin, Ireland (carpet)
Ireland	4
Greece	1

First Round
Snarøya, Norway (clay)
Norway	5
Nigeria	0
Tbilisi, Georgia (clay)
Georgia	2
Slovenia	3
Cairo, Egypt (clay)
Egypt	0
Portugal	5
Vilnius, Lithuania (indoor carpet)
Yugoslavia	3
Lithuania	2
Abidjan, Ivory Coast (hard)
Latvia	0
Ivory Coast	5
Poznań, Poland (clay)
Ghana	0
Poland	5
Dublin, Ireland (indoor hard)
Ireland	1
Belarus	4
Helsinki, Finland (indoor hard)
Greece	2
Finland	3

Second Round
Nova Gorica, Slovenia (clay)
Norway	4
Slovenia	1
Porto, Portugal (clay)
Portugal	3
Yugoslavia	2
Bytom, Poland (clay)
Ivory Coast	1
Poland	4
Tampere, Finland (clay)
Belarus	2
Finland	3

Third Round
Porto, Portugal (clay)
Norway	3
Portugal	2
Helsinki, Finland (indoor hard)
Poland	2
Finland	3

- Nigeria, Lithuania, Ghana, and Greece relegated to Group III in 1998.
- Norway and Finland promoted to Group I in 1998.

== First round ==
=== Norway vs. Nigeria ===
Norway
5
Snarøya Tennis Club, Snarøya, Norway
2–4 May 1997
Clay

Nigeria
0

			1	2	3	4	5
1	(Norway) (Nigeria)	Jan Frode Andersen; Sule Ladipo	6; 1	6; 0	6; 4
2	(Norway) (Nigeria)	Christian Ruud; Ganiyu Adenekan	6; 0	6; 1	6; 0
3	(Norway) (Nigeria)	Helge Koll-Frafjord / Christian Ruud; Ganiyu Adenekan / Sule Ladipo	6; 2	4; 6	6; 1	7^{7} 6^{5}
4	(Norway) (Nigeria)	Christian Ruud; Dickson Ogu	6; 0	6; 0
5	(Norway) (Nigeria)	Thomas Heyerdahl; Ganiyu Adenekan	7; 5	6; 3

=== Georgia vs. Slovenia ===
Georgia
2
Leila Meskhi Tennis Academy, Tbilisi, Georgia
2–4 May 1997
Clay

Slovenia
3

			1	2	3	4	5
1	(Georgia (country)) (Slovenia)	Vladimir Margalitadze; Iztok Božič	2; 6	3; 6	1; 6
2	(Georgia (country)) (Slovenia)	Vladimir Gabrichidze; Borut Urh	6; 3	7; 5	1; 6	3; 6	6; 4
3	(Georgia (country)) (Slovenia)	Vladimir Gabrichidze / David Katcharava; Marko Por / Borut Urh	6^{6} 7^{8}	5; 7	7^{7} 6^{2}	2; 6
4	(Georgia (country)) (Slovenia)	Vladimir Margalitadze; Borut Urh	2; 6	2; 6	0; 6
5	(Georgia (country)) (Slovenia)	Vladimir Gabrichidze; Andrej Kraševec	4; 6	7^{7} 6^{2}	6; 2

=== Egypt vs. Portugal ===
Egypt
0
Gezira Sporting Club, Cairo, Egypt
2–4 May 1997
Clay

Portugal
5

			1	2	3	4	5
1	(Egypt) (Portugal)	Gehad El Deeb; Nuno Marques	0; 6	4; 6	6^{5} 7^{7}
2	(Egypt) (Portugal)	Amr Ghoneim; Emanuel Couto	6; 2	4; 6	5; 7	3; 6
3	(Egypt) (Portugal)	Adli El Shafei / Amr Ghoneim; Emanuel Couto / Bernardo Mota	5; 7	1; 6	0; 6
4	(Egypt) (Portugal)	Amr Ghoneim; João Cunha e Silva	4; 6	3; 6
5	(Egypt) (Portugal)	Gehad El Deeb; Emanuel Couto	4; 6	5; 7

=== Lithuania vs. Yugoslavia ===
Lithuania
2
Karolina Tennis Club, Vilnius, Lithuania
2–4 May 1997
Carpet (indoors)

Yugoslavia
3

			1	2	3	4	5
1	(Lithuania) (Federal Republic of Yugoslavia)	Rolandas Muraška; Nenad Zimonjić	3; 6	1; 6	3; 6
2	(Lithuania) (Federal Republic of Yugoslavia)	Eugenius Cariovas; Bojan Vujić	6^{3} 7^{7}	6^{4} 7^{7}	2; 6
3	(Lithuania) (Federal Republic of Yugoslavia)	Eugenius Cariovas / Rolandas Muraška; Dušan Vemić / Nenad Zimonjić	4; 6	4; 6	4; 6
4	(Lithuania) (Federal Republic of Yugoslavia)	Rolandas Muraška; Bojan Vujić	7; 5	6; 4
5	(Lithuania) (Federal Republic of Yugoslavia)	Eugenius Cariovas; Vladimir Pavićević	7^{7} 6^{5}	4; 6	6; 3

=== Ivory Coast vs. Latvia ===
Ivory Coast
5
Hôtel Ivoire, Abidjan, Ivory Coast
2–4 May 1997
Hard

Latvia
0

			1	2	3	4	5
1	(Ivory Coast) (Latvia)	Claude N'Goran; Ivo Lagzdiņš	6; 1	6; 2	6; 0
2	(Ivory Coast) (Latvia)	Clément N'Goran; Raimonds Sproga	6; 4	6; 0	6; 2
3	(Ivory Coast) (Latvia)	Claude N'Goran / Clément N'Goran; Ivo Lagzdiņš / Raimonds Sproga	6; 1	6; 2	7; 5
4	(Ivory Coast) (Latvia)	Ilou Lonfo; Raimonds Sproga	6; 1	6; 2
5	(Ivory Coast) (Latvia)	Valentin Sanon; Oskars Vaskis	6; 4	6; 4

=== Poland vs. Ghana ===
Poland
5
Olimpia Tennis Club, Poznań, Poland
2–4 May 1997
Clay

Ghana
0

			1	2	3	4	5
1	(Poland) (Ghana)	Bartłomiej Dąbrowski; Daniel Omaboe	6; 0	6; 2	6; 2
2	(Poland) (Ghana)	Filip Anioła; Franklyn Ofori	6; 1	6; 3	6; 0
3	(Poland) (Ghana)	Bartłomiej Dąbrowski / Bernard Kaczorowski; Nortey Dowuona / Franklyn Ofori	6; 1	6; 2	7^{7} 6^{5}
4	(Poland) (Ghana)	Krystian Pfeiffer; Nortey Dowuona	6; 1	6; 1
5	(Poland) (Ghana)	Filip Anioła; Alexander Ofori	6; 1	6; 0

=== Ireland vs. Belarus ===
Ireland
1
Riverview Club, Dublin, Ireland
2–4 May 1997
Hard (indoors)

Belarus
4

			1	2	3	4	5
1	(Republic of Ireland) (Belarus)	Scott Barron; Max Mirnyi	2; 6	3; 6	6; 4	4; 6
2	(Republic of Ireland) (Belarus)	Owen Casey; Alexander Shvets	6; 2	4; 6	6; 3	4; 6	7; 5
3	(Republic of Ireland) (Belarus)	Scott Barron / Tom Hamilton; Max Mirnyi / Vladimir Voltchkov	4; 6	6^{5} 7^{7}	3; 6
4	(Republic of Ireland) (Belarus)	Scott Barron; Alexander Shvets	1; 6	2; 6	6^{4} 7^{7}
5	(Republic of Ireland) (Belarus)	Eoin Collins; Max Mirnyi	5; 7	3; 6

=== Finland vs. Greece ===
Finland
3
Tali Tennis Centre, Helsinki, Finland
2–4 May 1997
Hard (indoors)

Greece
2

			1	2	3	4	5
1	(Finland) (Greece)	Tuomas Ketola; Anastasios Vasiliadis	2; 6	6; 1	7^{8} 6^{6}	4; 6	4; 6
2	(Finland) (Greece)	Kim Tiilikainen; Konstantinos Economidis	7^{7} 6^{4}	5; 7	4; 6	1; 6
3	(Finland) (Greece)	Tuomas Ketola / Ville Liukko; Konstantinos Economidis / Anastasios Vasiliadis	6; 3	7^{8} 6^{6}	6; 4
4	(Finland) (Greece)	Ville Liukko; Konstantinos Economidis	6; 3	6; 4	6; 4
5	(Finland) (Greece)	Kim Tiilikainen; Anastasios Vasiliadis	6; 3	7^{7} 6^{3}	7^{7} 6^{3}

== Second round ==
=== Slovenia vs. Norway ===
Slovenia
1
Perla Stadium, Nova Gorica, Slovenia
11–13 July 1997
Clay

Norway
4

			1	2	3	4	5
1	(Slovenia) (Norway)	Iztok Božič; Christian Ruud	6; 4	2; 6	4; 6	3; 6
2	(Slovenia) (Norway)	Blaž Trupej; Jan Frode Andersen	6; 4	4; 6	3; 6	1; 6
3	(Slovenia) (Norway)	Andrej Kraševec / Marko Por; Helge Koll-Frafjord / Christian Ruud	6; 2	6; 3	5; 7	1; 6	6; 2
4	(Slovenia) (Norway)	Iztok Božič; Jan Frode Andersen	3; 6	6; 1	3; 6	2; 6
5	(Slovenia) (Norway)	Blaž Trupej; Christian Ruud	4; 6	4; 6

=== Portugal vs. Yugoslavia ===
Portugal
3
Maia Tennis Complex, Porto, Portugal
11–13 July 1997
Clay

Yugoslavia
2

			1	2	3	4	5
1	(Portugal) (Federal Republic of Yugoslavia)	João Cunha e Silva; Nenad Zimonjić	2; 6	6; 4	6; 4	6; 4
2	(Portugal) (Federal Republic of Yugoslavia)	Emanuel Couto; Bojan Vujić	3; 6	5; 7	7; 5	2; 6
3	(Portugal) (Federal Republic of Yugoslavia)	Emanuel Couto / Bernardo Mota; Nebojša Đorđević / Nenad Zimonjić	6; 4	6; 4	6; 4
4	(Portugal) (Federal Republic of Yugoslavia)	João Cunha e Silva; Bojan Vujić	4; 6	3; 6	6; 3	6; 4	3; 6
5	(Portugal) (Federal Republic of Yugoslavia)	Emanuel Couto; Nenad Zimonjić	6^{2} 7^{7}	7; 5	7; 5	6; 3

=== Poland vs. Ivory Coast ===
Poland
4
Górnik Sports Club, Bytom, Poland
11–13 July 1997
Clay

Ivory Coast
1

			1	2	3	4	5
1	(Poland) (Ivory Coast)	Michał Chmela; Claude N'Goran	4; 6	7; 5	2; 6	7^{7} 6^{4}	4; 6
2	(Poland) (Ivory Coast)	Bartłomiej Dąbrowski; Jean-Christophe Nabi	7^{7} 6^{1}	6; 1	6; 4
3	(Poland) (Ivory Coast)	Bartłomiej Dąbrowski / Michał Gawłowski; Ilou Lonfo / Claude N'Goran	6; 4	7^{9} 6^{7}	3; 6	6; 2
4	(Poland) (Ivory Coast)	Bartłomiej Dąbrowski; Claude N'Goran	6; 4	6; 1	6; 0
5	(Poland) (Ivory Coast)	Michał Chmela; Nouhoun Sangaré	6; 1	6; 2

=== Finland vs. Belarus ===
Finland
3
Rosendahl Tennis Centre, Tampere, Finland
11–13 July 1997
Clay

Belarus
2

			1	2	3	4	5
1	(Finland) (Belarus)	Tuomas Ketola; Vladimir Voltchkov	3; 6	6; 3	6^{5} 7^{7}	1; 6
2	(Finland) (Belarus)	Tommi Lenho; Alexander Shvets	7; 5	6; 1	4; 6	4; 6	6; 3
3	(Finland) (Belarus)	Tuomas Ketola / Ville Liukko; Alexander Shvets / Vladimir Voltchkov	3; 6	6; 4	6; 1	6; 1
4	(Finland) (Belarus)	Kim Tiilikainen; Alexander Shvets	6^{6} 7^{8}	6; 1	7; 5	6^{6} 7^{8}	6; 0
5	(Finland) (Belarus)	Ville Liukko; Vladimir Voltchkov	1; 6	6; 4	5; 7

== Relegation play-offs ==
=== Georgia vs. Nigeria ===
Georgia
5
Leila Meskhi Tennis Academy, Tbilisi, Georgia
11–14 July 1997
Clay

Nigeria
0

			1	2	3	4	5
1	(Georgia (country)) (Nigeria)	David Katcharava; Ganiyu Adenekan	6; 1	6; 2	6; 1
2	(Georgia (country)) (Nigeria)	Vladimir Gabrichidze; Sule Ladipo	6; 3	6; 2	6; 3
3	(Georgia (country)) (Nigeria)	Vladimir Gabrichidze / David Katcharava; Ganiyu Adenekan / Sule Ladipo	6^{8} 7^{10}	6; 3	6; 2	7; 5
4	(Georgia (country)) (Nigeria)	Givi Samkharadze; Sule Ladipo	6; 3					retired
5	(Georgia (country)) (Nigeria)	Vladimir Gabrichidze; Ganiyu Adenekan	6; 1	6; 2

=== Egypt vs. Lithuania ===
Egypt
3
Gezira Sporting Club, Cairo, Egypt
11–14 July 1997
Clay

Lithuania
2

			1	2	3	4	5
1	(Egypt) (Lithuania)	Gehad El Deeb; Rolandas Muraška	6; 4	4; 6	2; 6	0; 6
2	(Egypt) (Lithuania)	Amr Ghoneim; Eugenius Cariovas	3; 6	6; 2	7^{7} 6^{5}	6; 4
3	(Egypt) (Lithuania)	Amr Ghoneim / Hisham Hemeda; Eugenius Cariovas / Rolandas Muraška	7^{7} 6^{1}	7^{7} 6^{4}	4; 6	7^{7} 6^{4}
4	(Egypt) (Lithuania)	Amr Ghoneim; Rolandas Muraška	1; 6	6; 3	6; 4	3; 6	3; 6
5	(Egypt) (Lithuania)	Hisham Hemeda; Eugenius Cariovas	6; 2	7^{7} 6^{4}	6^{5} 7^{7}	5; 7	11; 9

=== Latvia vs. Ghana ===
Latvia
4
National Tennis Center Lielupe, Jūrmala, Latvia
11–13 July 1997
Clay

Ghana
1

			1	2	3	4	5
1	(Latvia) (Ghana)	Ģirts Dzelde; Gunther Darkey	6; 2	6; 1	6; 1
2	(Latvia) (Ghana)	Andris Fiļimonovs; Franklyn Ofori	6; 1	6; 2	6; 2
3	(Latvia) (Ghana)	Ģirts Dzelde / Andris Fiļimonovs; Franklyn Ofori / Isaac Tetteh-Quaye	6; 1	6; 1	6; 0
4	(Latvia) (Ghana)	Ģirts Dzelde; Franklyn Ofori	6^{5} 7^{7}	4; 6
5	(Latvia) (Ghana)	Andris Fiļimonovs; Gunther Darkey	6; 3	6; 2

=== Ireland vs. Greece ===
Ireland
4
Riverview Club, Dublin, Ireland
11–13 July 1997
Carpet

Greece
1

			1	2	3	4	5
1	(Republic of Ireland) (Greece)	Owen Casey; Solon Peppas	6; 1	6; 1	6; 0
2	(Republic of Ireland) (Greece)	Scott Barron; Konstantinos Economidis	6; 2	6; 2	3; 6	2; 6	4; 6
3	(Republic of Ireland) (Greece)	Scott Barron / Owen Casey; Konstantinos Economidis / Nikos Rovas	6; 2	6; 3	6; 2
4	(Republic of Ireland) (Greece)	Scott Barron; Solon Peppas	6; 3	6; 0	6; 1
5	(Republic of Ireland) (Greece)	Owen Casey; Konstantinos Economidis	6; 1	6; 4

== Third round ==
=== Portugal vs. Norway ===
Portugal
2
Maia Tennis Complex, Porto, Portugal
19–21 September 1997
Clay

Norway
3

			1	2	3	4	5
1	(Portugal) (Norway)	Nuno Marques; Jan Frode Andersen	5; 7	1; 6	6; 1	3; 6
2	(Portugal) (Norway)	Emanuel Couto; Christian Ruud	1; 6	1; 6	1; 6
3	(Portugal) (Norway)	Emanuel Couto / Bernardo Mota; Helge Koll-Frafjord / Christian Ruud	6; 4	7^{7} 6^{1}	4; 6	6; 2
4	(Portugal) (Norway)	Nuno Marques; Christian Ruud	6^{1} 7^{7}	6^{5} 7^{7}	6^{2} 7^{7}
5	(Portugal) (Norway)	Bernardo Mota; Helge Koll-Frafjord	6; 2	6; 3

=== Finland vs. Poland ===
Finland
3
Tali Tennis Centre, Helsinki, Finland
19–21 September 1997
Hard (indoors)

Poland
2

			1	2	3	4	5
1	(Finland) (Poland)	Ville Liukko; Bartłomiej Dąbrowski	6; 4	5; 7	5; 7	1; 6
2	(Finland) (Poland)	Tuomas Ketola; Michał Chmela	6; 3	2; 6	6; 2	4; 6	4; 6
3	(Finland) (Poland)	Tuomas Ketola / Ville Liukko; Michał Chmela / Bartłomiej Dąbrowski	7^{7} 6^{4}	6^{9} 7^{11}	6; 0	4; 6	6; 3
4	(Finland) (Poland)	Tuomas Ketola; Bartłomiej Dąbrowski	7^{7} 6^{4}	6; 1	7^{7} 6^{4}
5	(Finland) (Poland)	Ville Liukko; Michał Chmela	3; 6	3; 6	6; 4	6; 3	6; 4
