= Ivo Karlović =

Croatian tennis player (born 1979)

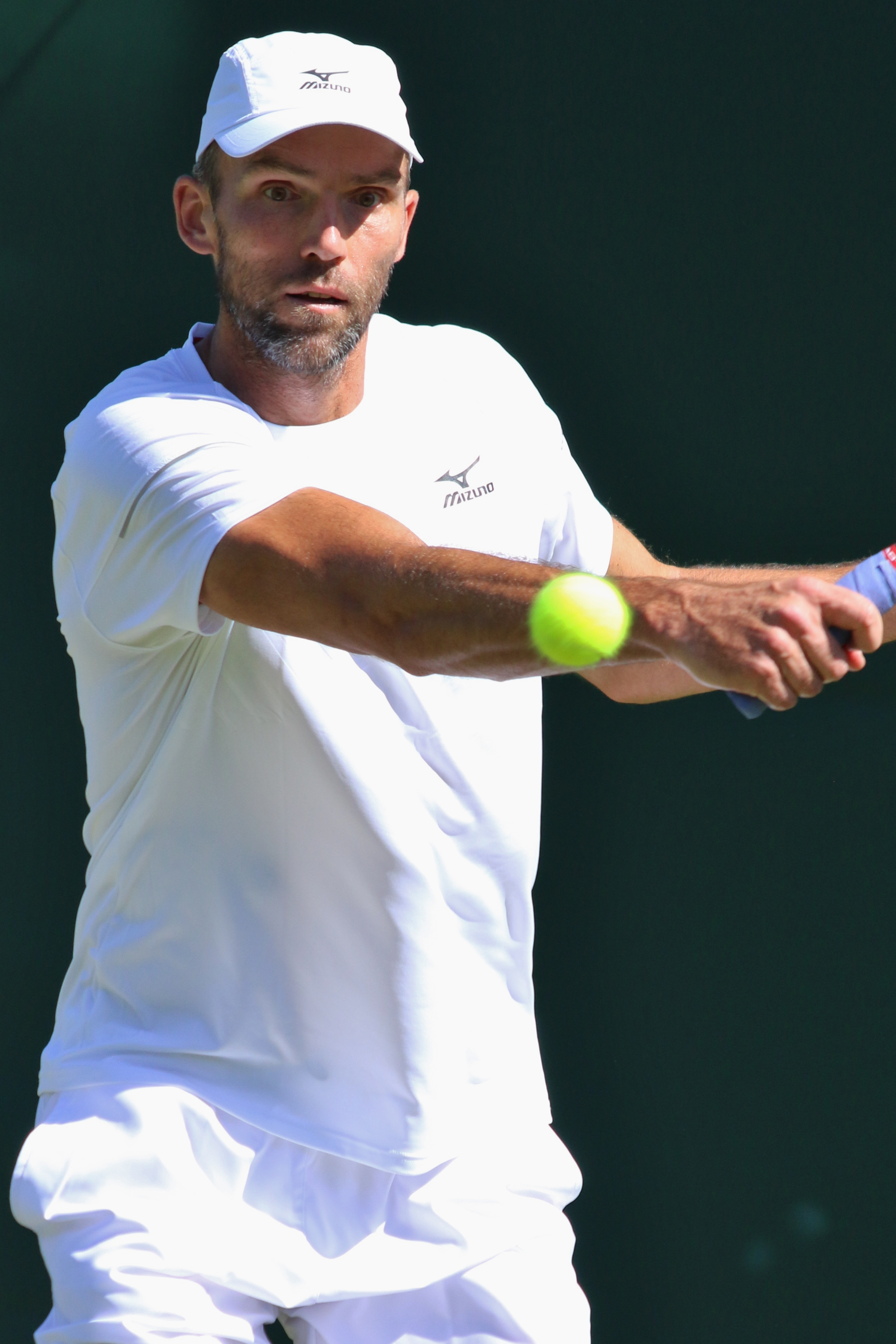
- Karlović at the 2018 Wimbledon Championships
- Country (sports): Croatia
- Residence: Grand Bahama, The Bahamas
- Born: 28 February 1979 (age 47) Zagreb, SR Croatia, SFR Yugoslavia
- Height: 2.11 m (6 ft 11 in)
- Turned pro: 2000
- Retired: 2024 (last match 2021)
- Plays: Right-handed (one-handed backhand)
- Prize money: US$10,160,232

Singles
- Career record: 371–346
- Career titles: 8
- Highest ranking: No. 14 (18 August 2008)

Grand Slam singles results
- Australian Open: 4R (2010)
- French Open: 3R (2014, 2016)
- Wimbledon: QF (2009)
- US Open: 4R (2016)

Other tournaments
- Olympic Games: 3R (2004)

Doubles
- Career record: 91–109
- Career titles: 2
- Highest ranking: No. 44 (10 April 2006)

Grand Slam doubles results
- Australian Open: SF (2010)
- French Open: 2R (2004, 2011)
- Wimbledon: 3R (2005)
- US Open: 2R (2004, 2007, 2011)

Grand Slam mixed doubles results
- French Open: 1R (2015)

Team competitions
- Davis Cup: W (2005)

Ivo Karlović (Croatian pronunciation: [ǐːʋo kâːrloʋitɕ]; born 28 February 1979) is a Croatian former professional tennis player. His height of 211 cm (6 ft 11 in) makes him the joint-tallest ranked tennis player in history (along with Reilly Opelka). He won eight ATP Tour singles titles between 2007 and 2016. He was a serve-and-volleyer and officially held the record for the fastest serve recorded in professional tennis, measured at 251 km/h (156 mph), before being officially surpassed by John Isner in 2016. He was considered one of the best servers on tour, and held the record for career aces from 1991 onwards with 13,728 (not including Davis Cup) before the record was broken by Isner on 1 July 2022. This makes him one of only five players since 1991 to surpass 10,000 aces. His height enabled him to serve with high speed and unique trajectory.

== Career ==
=== 1995–1997: Juniors ===
Karlović played his first junior match in April 1995 at the age of 16 at a grade 3 tournament in Croatia. He played only eight tournament throughout his junior career (four singles and four doubles). In singles, he defeated a 15-year-old Marat Safin at the 1995 Junior Davis Cup. In doubles, he was known for partnering future world No. 3 Ivan Ljubičić on numerous occasions.

Karlović ended his junior career with no ranking in both singles or doubles. He had an overall win–loss record of 3–5 in singles and 5–3 in doubles.

=== 1998–2004: Pro Beginnings ===
Although not turning pro until 2000 at the age of 21, Karlović played his first ITF futures event in June 1998 and made two finals in August 1998 and September 1999, losing both. He played his first Challenger event in December 1999.

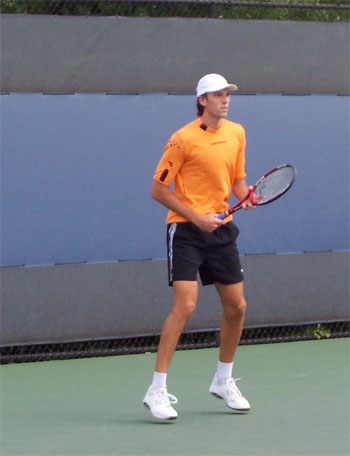
Karlović at the 2004 US Open

Karlović debuted for the Croatian Davis Cup team in 2000 against Ireland, where he won the dead rubber. Karlović appeared in a starting line-up for the first time in 2002 against Argentina in Buenos Aires, but he lost to Juan Ignacio Chela in the second rubber and to Gastón Gaudio in the fifth and decisive rubber. He has posted a 4–2 career record (2–2 in singles) in three ties since 2000.

Karlović caused a major upset at Wimbledon when he beat defending champion Lleyton Hewitt in his first match in a Grand Slam tournament. As of 2015, Karlović remains the only player in Open tennis history, and only the second player after Charlie Pasarell, to defeat the defending Wimbledon men's singles champion in the first round. He finished the 2003 year in the top 100 and as the Croatian No. 3, behind Ivan Ljubičić and Mario Ančić. He also averaged an ATP-best of 17.6 aces per match. He continued his success during the 2004 season, winning at Calabasas, California. He reached the round of sixteen in several tournaments, including Wimbledon.

=== 2005: First ATP final ===
In 2005, Karlović reached his first ATP final at the Queen's Club Championships, defeating Lleyton Hewitt and Thomas Johansson along the way. In the final he lost to Andy Roddick. There were no breaks of serve in the match. Afterwards, Roddick said Karlović's serve is "probably the biggest weapon in tennis... you don't really get a feel for it unless you are on the other side. It was not fun at times."

At the 2005 US Open, Karlović lost to eventual runner-up Andre Agassi in three tiebreakers. On 19 October 2005, he finally defeated Roddick in the Madrid Masters event. In November 2005, he was a member of the Croatian team that won the Davis Cup. He did not play in the finals, but played in a semifinal dead rubber.

=== 2006: Breaking into the top 50 in singles and doubles ===
On 26 February 2006, he won his first ATP Doubles Tournament with South African Chris Haggard, beating James Blake and Mardy Fish in the 2006 Regions Morgan Keegan Championships and the Cellular South Cup, Memphis, USA. On 27 February, he reached a career high of No. 47 in doubles and on 8 May he also reached the top 50 in singles.

=== 2007: First ATP title and breaking top 30 ===
Karlović and Roger Federer were the only players who won titles on three different surfaces during the 2007 season.

At age 28, he won his first ATP singles title at the 2007 U.S. Men's Clay Court Championships in Houston, Texas, defeating Mariano Zabaleta in the final. On 29 May 2007 at the French Open, he defeated eighth seed James Blake in the first round. In the next round he lost to Jonas Björkman in five sets.

On 23 June 2007, he won his second title of the year and his career at Nottingham, the last grass tune-up before Wimbledon, defeating seventh seed Stanislas Wawrinka, Gilles Simon, Juan Martín del Potro, second seed Dmitry Tursunov (a match played on indoor hard courts due to torrential rain), and Arnaud Clément. Despite a first-round loss at Wimbledon, he rose to No. 40, making his top-40 debut.

On 14 October 2007, he won his third title of the year by taking the Stockholm Open, defeating former Australian Open champion Thomas Johansson in three sets in the final. Earlier, Karlović had yet again met Frenchman Arnaud Clément in his quarterfinal, the pair having met five times that year alone, including in the final of Nottingham, where Karlović secured his second career title. Karlović edged past his rival after saving a match point in the final-set tiebreak, and then went on to defeat German No. 1 Tommy Haas in the semifinals.

=== 2008: Fourth ATP title and breaking top 15 ===
At the 2008 Australian Open, Karlović entered the men's doubles tournament with 6 ft 9 in (2.06 m) John Isner, making them the tallest doubles pair in history. Despite losing in the first round, Karlović said "It was a lot of fun. We will win together next time."

Karlović defeated world No. 1 Roger Federer in the third round of the Cincinnati Masters on 31 July 2008. This was his first victory in seven matches against Federer. It was this loss which caused Federer to lose his No. 1 ranking to Rafael Nadal. Karlović then advanced to the semifinals where he lost to eventual champion Andy Murray. This was his career-best result in a top-level tournament.

At the US Open, Karlović fell to Sam Querrey in straight sets.

At the 2008 Madrid Masters, he stunned World No. 3 Novak Djokovic in two tie-breaker sets serving 20 aces to seal victory in 1 hour and 42 minutes. However, he lost in the quarterfinals to Frenchman Gilles Simon, being dominated in the tiebreaks.

=== 2009: First Grand Slam quarterfinal ===
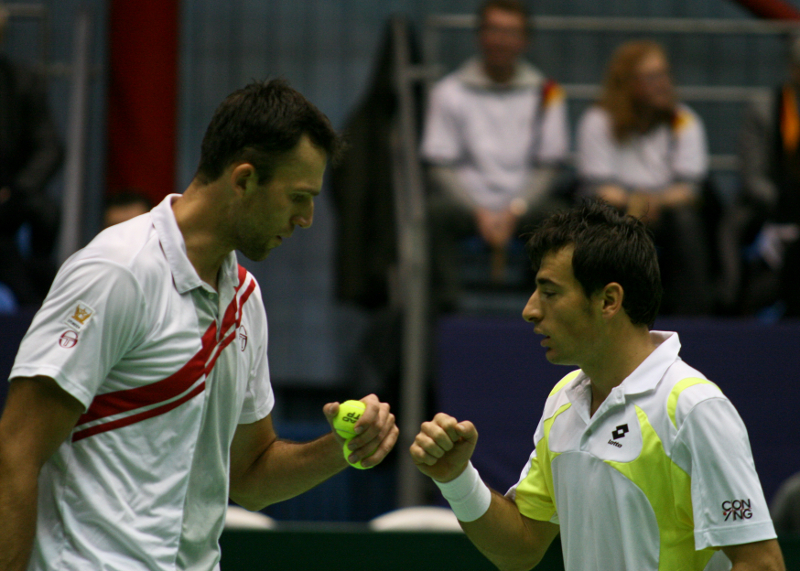
Ivo Karlović and Ivan Dodig in Davis Cup doubles match against Germany

At Wimbledon 2009, he powered through the first two rounds, beating Lukáš Lacko and Steve Darcis. In the next two rounds he needed only one break of serve in the third set to defeat both ninth seed Jo-Wilfried Tsonga and seventh seed Fernando Verdasco, advancing to face Roger Federer in his first quarterfinal at a Grand Slam. The match was a relatively one-sided affair, with Federer winning in straight sets and going on to win the tournament.

In the 2009 Davis Cup semifinals, Karlović was defeated by Radek Štěpánek, despite hitting a record-breaking 78 aces (the record has since been taken by John Isner). The match was one of the longest in the history of the Davis Cup, lasting 5 hours, 59 minutes. There were only three breaks of serve in this match.

Karlović also won his first five-set match in the Davis Cup quarterfinals against the United States, where he came from behind to beat James Blake from two sets down.

=== 2010: Australian Open fourth found, Injury and absence ===
Karlović met Štěpánek again at the 2010 Australian Open, in another five-set marathon. This time, the 13-seeded Štěpánek lost. In all five-set matches Karlović has played, this was only his second win. He went on to reach a career-best fourth round there, after beating Julien Benneteau (in four sets), and Ivan Ljubičić (also in four sets). After giving a solid performance, he was ousted by the second seed and defending champion Rafael Nadal in that round.

As the second seed at the 2010 Delray Beach International Tennis Championships, he made a runner-up effort, losing to first-time ATP-finalist Ernests Gulbis.

In the 2010 Davis Cup, where Croatia had a first-round clash with Ecuador, Karlović defeated Nicolás Lapentti in five sets. This was his third five-set match win, following his five-set win over Štěpánek at the Australian Open. His five-set record then stood at 3–12.

Karlović was forced to withdraw from 2010 Wimbledon due to a foot injury.

=== 2011–13: Rankings fall and fifth ATP title ===
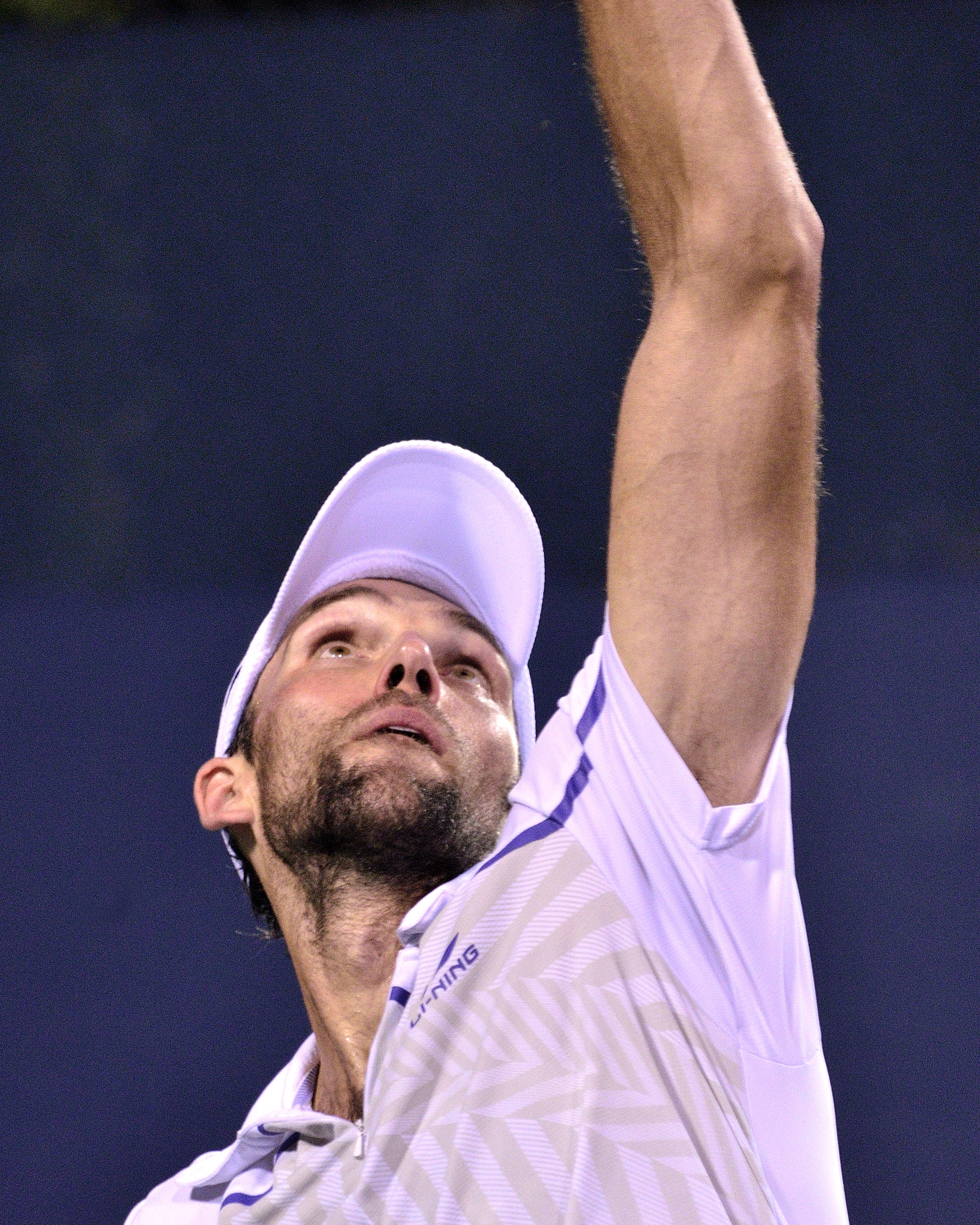
Karlović at the 2013 US Open

February 2011 saw Karlović temporarily exit from the top 200. In 2012, Karlović beat Dudi Sela in the first round of Wimbledon in straight sets, but was knocked out in the second round by Andy Murray. Karlović controversially accused Wimbledon of being biased, as he was pulled up for approximately 11-foot faults.

In 2013, Karlović suffered from viral meningitis, which was not immediately diagnosed. He was unconscious for some time, and when he woke up, he did not know his name or what year it was. After a lengthy recovery, he was able to play again in Newport in July, where he made it to the quarterfinals, before being defeated by John Isner in one of their typical ace-fests.

In Bogota, also in July, he won his fifth ATP title, beating Alejandro Falla in the final. He did not qualify for the Rogers Cup or Cincinnati Masters.

At the US Open, he made it through qualifying and into the second round by defeating James Blake in the last singles match of his career in five sets. In the second round, he met Stanislas Wawrinka, to whom he lost in straight sets.

=== 2014: Four ATP finals and return to top 30 ===
In February, Karlović reached the final of the U.S. National Indoor Tennis Championships, losing to Kei Nishikori. In May, he reached the final of the Düsseldorf Open, losing to Philipp Kohlschreiber. In July, he reached the final of the Hall of Fame Open, losing an epic match to Lleyton Hewitt. Another solid week of tennis saw him make back-to-back finals, this time at the Claro Open Colombia, losing to Bernard Tomic in a tight three-setter. He avenged that loss the following month at the Rogers Cup in another tight three-setter.

=== 2015: Sixth ATP title and return to top 20 ===
Karlović won his sixth title, defeating Donald Young at the Delray Beach Open. He also won the 2015 Topshelf Open in doubles with Łukasz Kubot. He reached his second Hall of Fame Open final, which he lost to Rajeev Ram in three sets.

=== 2016: Seventh & eight titles as oldest champion since 1979, return to top 20 ===
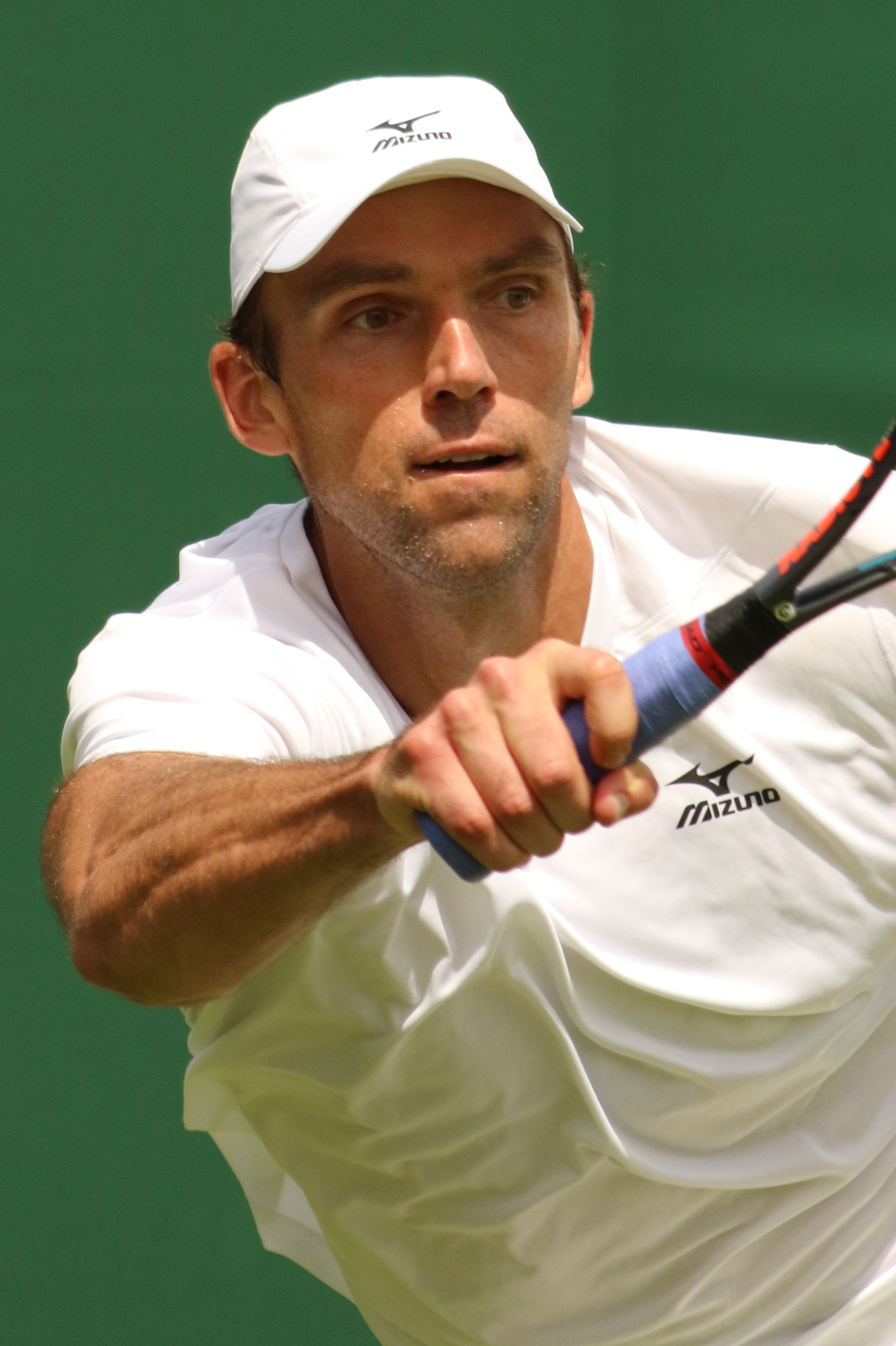
Karlović at the 2016 Wimbledon Championships

Karlović suffered a knee injury and missed two months of play.

He reached the final of the Hall of Fame Open for the third time against Gilles Müller, which he won in three tiebreaks. At the age of 37 and 5 months, he became the oldest player to win an ATP title since 1979. He reached an ATP World Tour 500 series tournament at the Washington Open (tennis), which he lost to Gaël Monfils.

He then won the Los Cabos Open, beating Feliciano López in straight sets and returned to the top 20 again at 37 years and 6 months.

=== 2017: 75 Aces at Australian Open ===
Karlović began the Australian Open by defeating Horacio Zeballos in a 5-hour, 15-minute match, the second-longest match at the tournament in the Open Era (behind the Djokovic–Nadal final in 2012). He set an Australian Open record, hitting 75 aces.

Aged 38, Karlović set up the oldest ATP Tour tournament final in 41 years against Gilles Muller, aged 34, at the 2017 Ricoh Open. He lost in straight sets.

=== 2018: Defying age ===
At the Australian Open, Karlović progressed to the Round of 32, losing to Andreas Seppi, 7–9 in the fifth set.

At the Ecuador Open in Quito, Karlović made it to the Round of 16, losing to 18 years old Corentin Moutet in a third-set tie-break.

Next, he reached the quarterfinals at New York Open losing to second seed Sam Querrey.

After a string of tight first round losses at Delray Beach Open, Indian Wells Masters and Miami Open (tennis), the U.S. Men's Clay Court Championships in Houston saw Karlović reach the semifinals with wins over Japanese Taro Daniel, Denis Kudla and 4th seed Nick Kyrgios. In the semifinals, he lost to eventual runner-up Tennys Sandgren in two close tie-break sets.

At Wimbledon, he reached the second round. At the US Open, he was defeated in the second round of qualifying.

In October, he became the oldest champion of an ATP Challenger tournament, winning the Calgary Challenger at 39 years and seven months.

=== 2019: Oldest ATP finalist since 1977 ===
At the Maharashtra Open Karlović beat teenager Félix Auger-Aliassime in first round. The age gap of 21 years and 6 months between the two players was the largest on the ATP Tour since 2011. Karlović and Auger-Aliassime were the oldest and the youngest players in the Top 200 ATP rankings at the beginning of the 2019 season. He went on to make the final, at 39 years and 10 months becoming the oldest finalist on the ATP Tour since 43-year-old Ken Rosewall won the 1977 Hong Kong championship.

With his victory over Matthew Ebden at the Indian Wells Masters, he became the first player aged over 40 to win an ATP Tour match since Jimmy Connors in 1995 in Halle. In addition, Karlović was the oldest to win a match in ATP Masters 1000 history. He subsequently defeated 11th seed, compatriot Borna Coric to become the oldest man to win two back-to-back matches at the Masters 1000-level.

=== 2021-2024: 63rd Grand Slam appearance, Retirement ===
At the 2021 Hall of Fame Open in Newport, Karlovic won against 24-year-old Bernabé Zapata Miralles. This was only his second match win for 2021, the first being at the 2021 Delray Beach Open against Pablo Andújar. At 42 years old, Karlovic was the oldest player to compete in an ATP Tour match since Thomas Muster, 44, in 2011 in Vienna (l. to Dominic Thiem in R1).

In July, Los Cabos Open organisers circulated news of Karlović's retirement at the 2021 US Open. Later, he said he may change his mind and continue playing in 2022 if he got good results. Karlović entered the 2021 US Open qualifying draw for possibly his last tournament. He won all three of his qualifying matches to qualify for the US Open, making him the second-oldest Grand Slam qualifier in the Open Era after Mal Anderson qualified for the 1977 Australian Open. It was his 17th Grand Slam draw participation at the US Open and the 63rd overall Grand Slam main draw appearance for the 42-year-old. He lost in the first round to 5th seed Andrey Rublev in straight sets.

He officially retired in February 2024 after two-and-a-half years of inactivity. He had been listed as a retired player by the International Tennis Integrity Agency since 15 June 2023.

== National representation ==
Karlović has been absent from some previous Croatian Davis Cup campaigns owing to his dispute with the Croatian Tennis Association. He further strained his relations with the Croatian Tennis Association and the Croatian Olympic Committee by his last-minute withdrawal from the Olympic tournament in Beijing, communicated via an SMS message.

He played against Japan in the first round in 2012 in Japan with wins over Kei Nishikori and Go Soeda in singles and in doubles winning with Dodig.

In 2016, he accepted an invitation to the Davis Cup final against Argentina. He played the second match, losing against Juan Martín del Potro, and had to play the last deciding match, again losing against Federico Delbonis.

== Performance timelines ==
Key
W	F	SF	QF	#R	RR	Q#	P#	DNQ	A	Z#	PO	G	S	B	NMS	NTI	P	NH

(W) winner; (F) finalist; (SF) semifinalist; (QF) quarterfinalist; (#R) rounds 4, 3, 2, 1; (RR) round-robin stage; (Q#) qualification round; (P#) preliminary round; (DNQ) did not qualify; (A) absent; (Z#) Davis/Fed Cup Zonal Group (with number indication) or (PO) play-off; (G) gold, (S) silver or (B) bronze Olympic/Paralympic medal; (NMS) not a Masters tournament; (NTI) not a Tier I tournament; (P) postponed; (NH) not held; (SR) strike rate (events won / competed); (W–L) win–loss record.
To avoid confusion and double counting, these charts are updated at the conclusion of a tournament or when the player's participation has ended.

=== Singles ===
Tournament	2000	2001	2002	2003	2004	2005	2006	2007	2008	2009	2010	2011	2012	2013	2014	2015	2016	2017	2018	2019	2020	2021	SR	W–L	Win%
Grand Slam tournaments
Australian Open	A	Q3	Q2	A	2R	1R	1R	1R	3R	2R	4R	1R	3R	1R	1R	2R	1R	3R	3R	2R	2R	A	0 / 17	16–17	48%
French Open	A	A	Q1	Q2	1R	1R	2R	2R	1R	1R	A	1R	1R	A	3R	1R	3R	2R	1R	2R	Q2	A	0 / 14	8–14	36%
Wimbledon	Q3	Q2	Q1	3R	4R	1R	1R	1R	1R	QF	A	2R	2R	A	1R	4R	2R	1R	2R	2R	NH	Q1	0 / 15	17–15	53%
US Open	Q1	Q2	Q1	3R	1R	2R	1R	1R	3R	1R	A	3R	1R	2R	2R	2R	4R	1R	Q2	1R	1R	1R	0 / 17	13–17	43%
Win–loss	0–0	0–0	0–0	4–2	4–4	1–4	1–4	1–4	4–4	5–4	3–1	3–4	3–4	1–2	3–4	5–4	6–4	3–4	3–3	3–4	1–2	0–1	0 / 63	54–63	46%
National representation
Summer Olympics	A	not held			3R	not held			A	not held			A	not held			A	not held				A	0 / 1	2–1	67%
Davis Cup	Z2	A	QF	A	1R	W	A	A	PO	SF	QF	1R	QF	A	A	A	F	A	A	A	A	A	1 / 8	9–10	47%
ATP Tour Masters 1000
Indian Wells Open	A	A	A	A	1R	2R	2R	Q1	3R	3R	2R	QF	1R	2R	2R	2R	A	2R	1R	4R	NH	Q2	0 / 14	13–14	48%
Miami Open	A	A	A	A	1R	1R	1R	1R	2R	2R	3R	1R	2R	Q1	2R	2R	A	3R	1R	1R	NH	Q2	0 / 14	4–14	22%
Monte-Carlo Masters	A	A	A	A	A	1R	1R	A	2R	2R	A	A	A	A	1R	A	1R	A	A	A	NH	A	0 / 6	2–6	25%
Madrid Open	not held		A	A	1R	QF	A	3R	QF	2R	2R	1R	1R	A	A	1R	1R	2R	A	A	NH	A	0 / 11	10–11	48%
Italian Open	A	A	A	A	3R	Q1	A	Q2	3R	2R	A	1R	Q2	A	2R	A	1R	A	A	A	A	A	0 / 6	6–6	50%
Canadian Open	A	A	Q1	A	1R	1R	A	2R	A	1R	A	3R	A	Q2	2R	3R	3R	A	A	Q2	NH	A	0 / 8	8–8	50%
Cincinnati Open	A	A	A	A	3R	Q1	A	1R	SF	2R	A	2R	A	Q2	1R	3R	1R	3R	Q2	1R	A	A	0 / 10	12–10	55%
Shanghai Masters	not Masters series									1R	A	A	A	A	3R	2R	1R	1R	A	A	not held		0 / 5	3–5	37%
Paris Masters	A	Q1	A	Q1	Q1	A	A	2R	1R	2R	A	A	A	Q1	1R	1R	2R	A	A	A	A	A	0 / 6	3–6	33%
German Open	A	A	A	A	A	1R	A	A	3R	not Masters Series													0 / 2	2–2	50%
Win–loss	0–0	0–0	0–0	0–0	4–6	4–6	1–3	4–5	12–8	6–9	2–3	7–6	1–3	1–1	6–8	5–7	3–7	4–5	0–2	3–3	0–0	0–0	0 / 82	63–82	43%
Career statistics
	2000	2001	2002	2003	2004	2005	2006	2007	2008	2009	2010	2011	2012	2013	2014	2015	2016	2017	2018	2019	2020	2021	Career		
Tournaments	0	1	2	7	25	22	18	24	26	22	9	20	16	14	28	26	24	20	16	15	4	4	343		
Titles	0	0	0	0	0	0	0	3	1	0	0	0	0	1	0	1	2	0	0	0	0	0	8		
Finals	0	0	0	0	0	1	0	4	1	0	1	0	0	1	4	2	3	1	0	1	0	0	19		
Hard W–L	0–0	0–1	1–1	5–4	6–12	9–11	8–11	29–16	19–15	10–15	15–7	12–14	14–11	13–11	24–18	26–18	20–15	8–12	4–7	9–11	1–4	1–3	4 / 217	234–217	52%
Clay W–L	0–0	0–0	0–2	1–1	5–8	0–6	7–5	5–2	5–8	6–6	2–2	3–4	0–4	0–1	7–6	1–3	4–6	3–4	5–6	1–2	0–0	0–0	1 / 71	55–76	42%
Grass W–L	1–0	0–0	0–1	3–2	5–3	7–3	0–2	8–2	7–2	7–2	0–0	1–3	2–2	2–1	5–4	11–4	8–3	4–4	2–3	1–2	0–0	1–1	3 / 47	75–44	63%
Carpet W–L	1–0	0–0	0–0	0–0	2–3	1–3	2–1	1–1	0–1	discontinued													0 / 8	7–9	44%
Overall win–loss	2–0	0–1	1–4	9–7	18–26	17–23	17–19	43–21	31–26	23–23	17–9	16–21	16–17	15–13	36–28	38–25	32–24	15–20	11–16	11–15	1–4	2–4	8 / 343	371–346	52%
Win %	100%	0%	20%	56%	41%	43%	47%	67%	54%	50%	61%	43%	48%	54%	56%	60%	57%	43%	41%	42%	20%	33%	51.74%		
Year-end ranking	286	193	201	73	61	70	98	22	26	37	73	56	100	78	27	23	20	80	100	95	147	273	$10,160,232		

=== Doubles ===
Tournament	2004	2005	2006	2007	2008	2009	2010	2011	2012	2013	2014	2015	2016	2017	2018	2019	2020	2021	SR	W–L
Grand Slam tournaments
Australian Open	3R	1R	QF	1R	1R	2R	SF	1R	1R	A	1R	1R	A	A	A	A	A	A	0 / 11	10–11
French Open	2R	1R	1R	A	A	1R	A	2R	A	A	A	A	1R	A	A	A	A	A	0 / 6	2–6
Wimbledon	1R	3R	A	A	A	A	A	2R	2R	A	A	A	A	A	A	A	NH	A	0 / 4	4–4
US Open	2R	A	1R	2R	1R	A	A	2R	1R	A	1R	A	A	A	A	A	A	A	0 / 7	3–7
Win–loss	4–4	2–3	3–3	1–2	0–2	1–2	4–1	3–4	1–3	0–0	0–2	0–1	0–1	0–0	0–0	0–0	0–0	0–0	0 / 28	19–28
Career statistics
	2004	2005	2006	2007	2008	2009	2010	2011	2012	2013	2014	2015	2016	2017	2018	2019	2020	2021	Career	
Tournaments	12	10	10	9	10	8	5	10	10	4	7	3	1	0	3	0	0	0	111	
Titles / Finals	0 / 0	0 / 0	1 / 1	0 / 1	0 / 0	0 / 0	0 / 0	0 / 0	0 / 0	0 / 0	0 / 0	1 / 1	0 / 0	0 / 0	0 / 0	0 / 0	0 / 0	0 / 0	2 / 3	
Overall win–loss	11–12	7–9	16–8	7–9	2–11	5–8	7–5	6–11	10–11	5–4	1–6	3–2	0–1	0–0	4–3	0–0	0–0	0–0	91–109	
Year-end ranking	87	109	66	153	375	176	82	162	140	248	812	277	–	–	270	–	–	–	45.5%	

== Style of play ==
Karlović plays powerfully and focused on offense. He uses his strong serve as part of this strategy. His height of 2.11 meters makes his serve powerful. He has hit 13,762 aces during his career, the second most in ATP history.

Besides his huge serve, Karlović also has a powerful forehand which he usually hits deep and fast into his opponent's baseline. On his backhand side, he usually slices the ball deep into his opponent's baseline and rarely uses the one-handed backhand drive that he possesses.

Karlović is also known as a serve-and-volleyer. His serve usually causes players to return the ball lightly, at which point he will come forward on the ball and volley it. His skill at the net is one of the key traits of his playing style.

=== Serving records ===
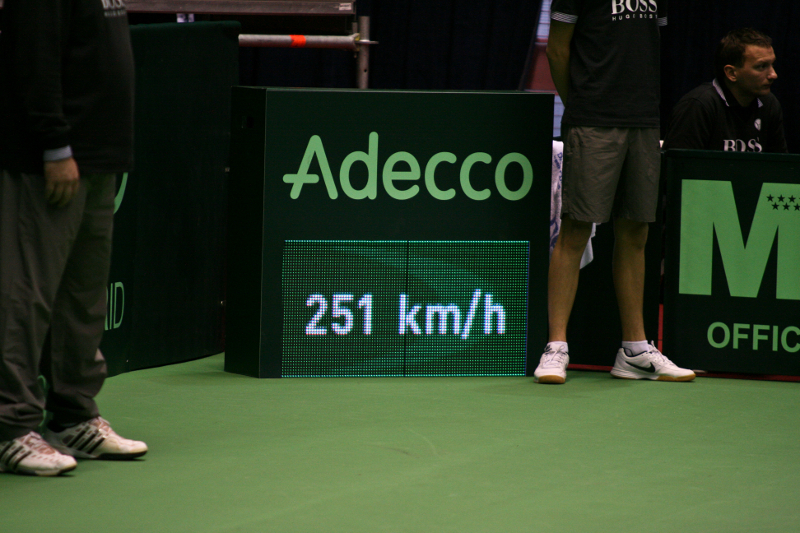
Karlović produced the fastest serve ever during a Davis Cup doubles match against Germany on 5 March 2011

On 18 September 2009, Karlović hit 78 aces (77 aces on 1st serve) in a Davis Cup match against Radek Štěpánek, breaking his previous record of 51 (against Daniele Bracciali in the 2005 Wimbledon Championships) and 55 (against Lleyton Hewitt in the 2009 French Open). Only once in his ATP career has he failed to hit an ace during a match, which was in the 2008 Monte Carlo Masters against Frenchman Gaël Monfils. His record of aces in a single match was broken by both John Isner and Nicolas Mahut in the longest match in tennis history at the first round of the 2010 Wimbledon Championships, where Isner hit 113 aces and Mahut hit 103.

In 2007, Karlović became the fourth player since 1991 to serve 1,000 aces in a season. He finished the year with 1,318 aces, second behind Goran Ivanišević, who hit 1,477 in 1996. In 2015, he became the third player since 1991 (after Goran Ivanišević and Andy Roddick) to serve 9,000 career aces., and the second to notch 10,000 aces.

Karlović's fastest official serve is 156 miles per hour (251 km/h), which he hit during his five-set loss in the 2011 Davis Cup first round third rubber doubles match with Ivan Dodig against Christopher Kas and Philipp Petzschner of Germany. That was ATP's official record at the time. His previous record was 153 miles per hour (246 km/h) in a victory over Arnaud Clément in the final of Nottingham in 2007. This is the third-fastest first serve on record, after Andy Roddick's 155 miles per hour (249 km/h). He also hit a 144 miles per hour (232 km/h) second serve against Paul Capdeville in the quarterfinals of the 2007 Legg Mason Tennis Classic on 3 August, which is the fastest second serve on record.

Karlovic's record of a 156 mph serve was broken by Samuel Groth at the 2012 ATP Challenger in Busan, but was still the record for ATP events until John Isner broke the record in 2016.

On 19 June 2015 Karlović broke the record for most aces in a three-set ATP Tour match during the quarterfinal of 2015 Gerry Weber Open. He served 45 aces in a 7–5, 6–7^{(8–10)}, 6–3 win over Tomáš Berdych.

Karlović held the record for the most aces since 1991 after surpassing Goran Ivanišević in October 2015. As of September 2021, he has struck 13,728 aces in 694 matches (not including Davis Cup). This record was surpassed by John Isner in June 2022, who hit his 13,729th ace in a third round match at the 2022 Wimbledon Championships.

== Personal life ==
During Karlović's childhood, his mother Gordana worked in agriculture, while his father Vlado was a meteorologist.

Karlović married his wife Alsi on 29 March 2005. Their first child, Jada Valentina, was born in September 2011.

One of his favorite activities is playing basketball.

Karlović is known for his humorous Twitter account.

Karlović wears European size 51 shoes.

== Equipment and apparel ==
Karlovic currently endorses the Head Graphene Radical Pro, and wears Mizuno clothing.

Early on in his career, Karlović used Head Prestige racquets, until switching to the Head Flexpoint Instinct in 2005. He continued to use the Instinct until 2012, except for a brief switch to the Babolat AeroPro Drive Cortex in 2009.

In 2013, after a period of struggling to find a replacement for the Flexpoint Instinct he enjoyed, he finally switched to the Head YouTek IG Radical Pro, and proceeded to endorse the new Graphene Radical in 2014.

Karlović has previously worn apparel by Diadora, My OCK, Adidas, Nike, Li-Ning, Sergio Tacchini and Mizuno, as well as his own brand 6'10".

== ATP career finals ==
=== Singles: 19 (8 titles, 11 runner-ups) ===
Legend Grand Slam tournaments (0–0) ATP World Tour Finals (0–0) ATP World Tour Masters 1000 (0–0) ATP International Series Gold / ATP World Tour 500 Series (0–1) ATP International Series / ATP World Tour 250 Series (8–10)	Finals by surface Hard (4–6) Clay (1–1) Grass (3–4)	Finals by setting Outdoor (7–10) Indoor (1–1)

Result	W–L	Date	Tournament	Tier	Surface	Opponent	Score
Loss	0–1	Jun 2005	Queen's Club Championships, United Kingdom	International	Grass	(United States) Andy Roddick	6–7^{(7–9)}, 6–7^{(4–7)}
Loss	0–2	Feb 2007	Pacific Coast Championships, United States	International	Hard	(United Kingdom) Andy Murray	7–6^{(7–3)}, 4–6, 6–7^{(2–7)}
Win	1–2	Apr 2007	US Clay Court Championships, United States	International	Clay	(Argentina) Mariano Zabaleta	6–4, 6–1
Win	2–2	Jun 2007	Nottingham Open, United Kingdom	International	Grass	(France) Arnaud Clément	3–6, 6–4, 6–4
Win	3–2	Oct 2007	Stockholm Open, Sweden	International	Hard (i)	(Sweden) Thomas Johansson	6–3, 3–6, 6–1
Win	4–2	Jun 2008	Nottingham Open, United Kingdom (2)	International	Grass (Note: The final itself was played on indoor hard due to rain.)	(Spain) Fernando Verdasco	7–5, 6–7^{(4–7)}, 7–6^{(10–8)}
Loss	4–3	Feb 2010	Delray Beach Open, United States	250 Series	Hard	(Latvia) Ernests Gulbis	2–6, 3–6
Win	5–3	Jul 2013	Colombia Open, Colombia	250 Series	Hard	(Colombia) Alejandro Falla	6–3, 7–6^{(7–4)}
Loss	5–4	Feb 2014	US National Indoor Championships, United States	250 Series	Hard (i)	(Japan) Kei Nishikori	4–6, 6–7^{(0–7)}
Loss	5–5	May 2014	Düsseldorf Open, Germany	250 Series	Clay	(Germany) Philipp Kohlschreiber	2–6, 6–7^{(4–7)}
Loss	5–6	Jul 2014	Hall of Fame Open, United States	250 Series	Grass	(Australia) Lleyton Hewitt	3–6, 7–6^{(7–4)}, 6–7^{(3–7)}
Loss	5–7	Jul 2014	Colombia Open, Colombia	250 Series	Hard	(Australia) Bernard Tomic	6–7^{(5–7)}, 6–3, 6–7^{(4–7)}
Win	6–7	Feb 2015	Delray Beach Open, United States	250 Series	Hard	(United States) Donald Young	6–3, 6–3
Loss	6–8	Jul 2015	Hall of Fame Open, United States	250 Series	Grass	(United States) Rajeev Ram	6–7^{(5–7)}, 7–5, 6–7^{(2–7)}
Win	7–8	Jul 2016	Hall of Fame Open, United States	250 Series	Grass	(Luxembourg) Gilles Müller	6–7^{(2–7)}, 7–6^{(7–5)}, 7–6^{(14–12)}
Loss	7–9	Jul 2016	Washington Open, United States	500 Series	Hard	(France) Gaël Monfils	7–5, 6–7^{(6–8)}, 4–6
Win	8–9	Aug 2016	Los Cabos Open, Mexico	250 Series	Hard	(Spain) Feliciano López	7–6^{(7–5)}, 6–2
Loss	8–10	Jun 2017	Rosmalen Championships, Netherlands	250 Series	Grass	(Luxembourg) Gilles Müller	6–7^{(5–7)}, 6–7^{(4–7)}
Loss	8–11	Jan 2019	Maharashtra Open, India	250 Series	Hard	(South Africa) Kevin Anderson	6–7^{(4–7)}, 7–6^{(7–2)}, 6–7^{(5–7)}

=== Doubles: 3 (2 titles, 1 runner-up) ===
Legend Grand Slam tournaments (0–0) ATP World Tour Finals (0–0) ATP World Tour Masters 1000 (0–0) ATP International Series Gold / ATP World Tour 500 Series (1–0) ATP International Series / ATP World Tour 250 Series (1–1)	Finals by surface Hard (1–1) Clay (0–0) Grass (1–0)	Finals by setting Outdoor (1–1) Indoor (1–0)

Result	W–L	Date	Tournament	Tier	Surface	Partner	Opponents	Score
Win	1–0	Feb 2006	US National Indoor Championships, United States	Intl. Gold	Hard (i)	(South Africa) Chris Haggard	(United States) James Blake (United States) Mardy Fish	0–6, 7–5, [10–5]
Loss	1–1	Jul 2007	Indianapolis Championships, United States	International	Hard	(Russia) Teymuraz Gabashvili	(Argentina) Juan Martín del Potro (United States) Travis Parrott	6–3, 2–6, [6–10]
Win	2–1	Jun 2015	Rosmalen Championships, Netherlands	250 Series	Grass	(Poland) Łukasz Kubot	(France) Pierre-Hugues Herbert (France) Nicolas Mahut	6–2, 7–6^{(11–9)}

== ATP Challenger Tour finals ==
=== Singles: 12 (7–5) ===
Result	W–L	Date	Tournament	Surface	Opponent	Score
Win	1–0	Dec 2001	Urbana, United States	Hard (i)	(United States) Robby Ginepri	6–4, 7–6^{(7–5)}
Loss	1–1	Jul 2002	Andorra, Andorra	Hard	(Belgium) Dick Norman	4–6, 4–6
Win	2–1	Aug 2003	Binghamton, United States	Hard	(France) Nicolas Thomann	7–6^{(8–6)}, 6–7^{(6–8)}, 7–6^{(7–4)}
Win	3–1	Aug 2003	Bronx, United States	Hard	(Russia) Dmitry Tursunov	6–3, 6–3
Win	4–1	Apr 2004	Calabasas, United States	Hard	(United States) Alex Bogomolov Jr.	7–6^{(7–3)}, 6–3
Loss	4–2	Jun 2005	Surbiton, United Kingdom	Grass	(Italy) Daniele Bracciali	7–6^{(7–0)}, 6–7^{(5–7)}, 6–7^{(4–7)}
Loss	4–3	Jun 2007	Surbiton, United Kingdom	Grass	(France) Jo-Wilfried Tsonga	3–6, 6–7^{(4–7)}
Win	5–3	Oct 2011	Sacramento, United States	Hard	(United States) James Blake	6–4, 3–6, 6–4
Win	6–3	Oct 2011	Tiburon, United States	Hard	(United States) Sam Querrey	6–7^{(2–7)}, 6–1, 6–4
Loss	6–4	Oct 2018	Monterrey, Mexico	Hard	(Spain) David Ferrer	3–6, 4–6
Win	7–4	Oct 2018	Calgary, Canada	Hard (i)	(Australia) Jordan Thompson	7–6^{(7–3)}, 6–3
Loss	7–5	Nov 2019	Houston, United States	Hard	(United States) Marcos Giron	5–7, 7–6^{(7–5)}, 6–7^{(9–11)}

=== Doubles: 3 (0–3) ===
Result	W–L	Date	Tournament	Surface	Partner	Opponents	Score
Loss	0–1	Dec 1999	Jaipur, India	Grass	(Kazakhstan) Yuri Schukin	(Czech Republic) Tomáš Anzari (Japan) Satoshi Iwabuchi	6–7^{(6–8)}, 6–4, 6–7^{(5–7)}
Loss	0–2	Jun 2001	Salvador, Brazil	Hard	(Mexico) Alejandro Hernández	(Brazil) Adriano Ferreira (Brazil) Daniel Melo	6–3, 3–6, 6–7^{(3–7)}
Loss	0–3	Dec 2002	Yokohama, Japan	Carpet (i)	(New Zealand) Mark Nielsen	(Chinese Taipei) Lu Yen-hsun (Thailand) Danai Udomchoke	6–7^{(5–7)}, 3–6

== ITF futures finals ==
=== Singles: 8 (4–4) ===
Result	W–L	Date	Tournament	Surface	Opponent	Score
Loss	0–1	Aug 1998	Croatia F6, Umag	Clay	(Croatia) Željko Krajan	3–6, 6–3, 3–6
Loss	0–2	Sep 1999	Germany F10, Oberhaching	Clay	(Czech Republic) Radim Žitko	1–6, 2–6
Loss	0–3	Feb 2000	Great Britain F1, Leeds	Carpet (i)	(Norway) Helge Koll-Frafjord	6–7^{(4–7)}, 6–7^{(2–7)}
Loss	0–4	Feb 2000	Croatia F2, Zagreb	Clay	(Croatia) Mario Ančić	6–7^{(14–16)}, 4–6
Win	1–4	Mar 2000	France F6, Douai	Clay (i)	(Belgium) Olivier Rochus	7–6^{(7–5)}, 7–6^{(7–5)}
Win	2–4	Sep 2000	France F18, Mulhouse	Hard (i)	(France) Antony Dupuis	6–7^{(4–7)}, 7–6^{(7–5)}, 6–4
Win	3–4	May 2001	Austria F3, Kramsach	Clay	(Spain) Marc Fornell-Mestres	6–3, 6–3
Win	4–4	Mar 2002	USA F6, San Antonio	Hard	(United States) Marc Silva	7–6^{(7–3)}, 6–4

=== Doubles: 10 (4–6) ===
Result	W–L	Date	Tournament	Surface	Partner	Opponents	Score
Loss	0–1	Jun 1998	Croatia F1, Veli Lošinj	Clay	(Croatia) Igor Šarić	(Croatia) Saša Hiršzon (Croatia) Željko Krajan	6–7, 3–6
Win	1–1	Aug 1998	Croatia F4, Umag	Clay	(Croatia) Lovro Zovko	(Slovenia) Jaka Bozic (Slovenia) Marko Por	7–5, 7–6
Loss	1–2	Aug 1998	Croatia F5, Umag	Clay	(Croatia) Lovro Zovko	(Sweden) Simon Aspelin (Norway) Helge Koll-Frafjord	5–7, 4–6
Loss	1–3	May 1999	Italy F7, Verona	Clay	(Croatia) Goran Orešić	(Italy) Massimo Ardinghi (Italy) Filippo Messori	4–6, 6–7
Loss	1–4	Jul 1999	Slovenia F2, Portorož	Clay	(Croatia) Goran Orešić	(Czech Republic) Leoš Friedl (Czech Republic) Petr Kovačka	5–7, 4–6
Loss	1–5	Feb 2000	Great Britain F2, Chigwell	Carpet (i)	(France) Maxime Boyé	(United Kingdom) James Davidson (Sweden) Fredrik Loven	6–7^{(1–7)}, 6–7^{(5–7)}
Win	2–5	Feb 2000	Croatia F2, Zagreb	Clay	(Austria) Clemens Trimmel	(Finland) Tapio Nurminen (Finland) Janne Ojala	6–4, 6–4
Win	3–5	Mar 2000	France F7, Poitiers	Hard (i)	(France) Maxime Boyé	(Sweden) Robert Lindstedt (Sweden) Fredrik Lovén	5–7, 6–3, 7–6^{(7–1)}
Win	4–5	Mar 2001	France F6, Poitiers	Carpet (i)	(Croatia) Lovro Zovko	(Switzerland) Yves Allegro (Belgium) Arnaud Fontaine	7–6^{(7–3)}, 6–7^{(5–7)}, 6–2
Loss	4–6	May 2001	Germany F2, Esslingen	Clay	(Australia) Paul Baccanello	(Germany) Franz Stauder (Germany) Alexander Waske	5–7, 6–1, 4–6

== National representation ==
=== Team competition finals ===
==== Davis Cup: 2 (1 title, 1 runner-up) ====
Result	Date	Tournament	Surface	Partners	Opponents	Score
Win	Dec 2005	Davis Cup, Bratislava, Slovakia	Hard (i)	(Croatia) Ivan Ljubičić (Croatia) Mario Ančić (Croatia) Goran Ivanišević	(Slovakia) Dominik Hrbatý (Slovakia) Karol Kučera (Slovakia) Michal Mertiňák	3–2
Loss	Nov 2016	Davis Cup, Zagreb, Croatia	Hard (i)	(Croatia) Marin Čilić (Croatia) Ivan Dodig (Croatia) Franko Škugor	(Argentina) Juan Martín del Potro (Argentina) Federico Delbonis (Argentina) Leonardo Mayer (Argentina) Guido Pella	2–3

==== World Team Cup: 1 (1 title) ====
Result	Date	Tournament	Surface	Partners	Opponents	Score
Win	May 2006	World Team Cup, Düsseldorf, Germany	Clay	(Croatia) Ivan Ljubičić (Croatia) Mario Ančić	(Germany) Nicolas Kiefer (Germany) Alexander Waske (Germany) Michael Kohlmann	2–1

=== Davis Cup (13–14) ===
Group membership World Group (7–12) WG Play-off (2–1) Group I (0–1) Group II (4–0)	Matches by surface Hard (8–6) Clay (1–7) Grass (0–0) Carpet (4–1)	Matches by type Singles (9–10) Doubles (4–4)	Matches by venue Croatia (8–8) Away (5–6)

- ▲ ▼ indicates the outcome of the Davis Cup match followed by the score, date, place of event, the zonal classification and its phase, and the court surface.

Result	Rubber	Match type (partner if any)	Opponent nation	Opponent player(s)	Score
▲5–0; 14–16 July 2000; Fitzwilliam L.T.C. Dublin, Ireland; Group II Europe/Africa Second round; Carpet surface
Victory	III	Doubles (with Goran Ivanišević)	(Republic of Ireland) Ireland	Scott Barron / Owen Casey	6–7^{(5–7)}, 6–2, 6–1, 6–1
Victory	IV	Singles (dead rubber)	(Republic of Ireland) Ireland	Conor Niland	4–6, 6–3, 6–4
▲5–0; 6–8 October 2000; Mladost Trsat Hall, Rijeka, Croatia; Group II Europe/Africa Third round; Carpet surface
Victory	III	Doubles (with Goran Ivanišević)	Ivory Coast	Ilou Lonfo / Claude N'Goran	7–6^{(8–6)}, 6–4, 6–7^{(5–7)}, 4–6, 6–0
Victory	V	Singles (dead rubber)	Ivory Coast	Claude N'Goran	6–4, 6–1
▼2–3; 5–7 April 2002; Buenos Aires Lawn Tennis Club, Buenos Aires, Argentina; World Group Quarterfinals; Clay surface
Defeat	II	Singles	Argentina	Juan Ignacio Chela	7–5, 4–6, 4–6, 2–6
Defeat	V	Singles	Argentina	Gastón Gaudio	4–6, 4–6, 2–6
▼1–4; 6–8 February 2004; Les Arenes, Metz, France; World Group First round; Clay surface
Defeat	II	Doubles (with Mario Ančić)	France	Nicolas Escudé / Michaël Llodra	1–6, 6–7^{(5–7)}, 3–6
Defeat	IV	Singles (dead rubber)	France	Nicolas Escudé	6–7^{(5–7)}, 2–6
▲3–2; 23–25 September 2005; Dvorana SC Gripe, Split, Croatia; World Group Semifinals; Carpet surface
Defeat	V	Singles (dead rubber)	Russia	Dmitry Tursunov	4–6, 4–6
▲3–2; 11–13 April 2008; Sportska Dvorana, Dubrovnik, Croatia; Group I Europe/Africa Second round; Hard surface
Defeat	I	Singles	Italy	Simone Bolelli	6–7^{(7–9)}, 3–6, 4–6
▲4–1; 19–21 September 2008; Sportski Centar Visnjik, Zadar, Croatia; World Group play-offs; Hard surface
Victory	II	Singles	Brazil	Thiago Alves	7–6^{(7–5)}, 7–6^{(7–3)}, 7–5
Defeat	III	Doubles (with Lovro Zovko)	Brazil	Marcelo Melo / André Sá	7–6^{(7–3)}, 2–6, 5–7, 7–6^{(7–5)}, 3–6
Victory	IV	Singles	Brazil	Thomaz Bellucci	7–6^{(7–5)}, 6–4, 6–7^{(6–8)}, 7–6^{(7–4)}
▲5–0; 6–8 March 2009; Visenamjenska Sportska Dvorana "Zatika", Poreč, Croatia; World Group First round; Hard surface
Victory	V	Singles (dead rubber)	Chile	Hans Podlipnik Castillo	6–3, 7–6^{(7–4)}
▲3–2; 10–12 July 2009; Visenamjenska Sportska Dvorana "Zatika", Poreč, Croatia; World Group Quarterfinals; Clay surface
Victory	I	Singles	United States	James Blake	6–7^{(5–7)}, 4–6, 6–3, 7–6^{(7–3)}, 7–5
▼1–4; 18–20 September 2009; Visenamjenska Sportska Dvorana "Zatika", Poreč, Croatia; World Group Semifinals; Clay surface
Defeat	I	Singles	Czech Republic	Radek Štěpánek	7–6^{(7–5)}, 6–7^{(5–7)}, 6–7^{(6–8)}, 7–6^{(7–2)}, 14–16
▲5–0; 5–7 March 2010; Gradska Sportska Dvorana Varazdin, Varaždin, Croatia; World Group First round; Hard surface
Victory	I	Singles	Ecuador	Nicolás Lapentti	6–2, 5–7, 6–7^{(2–7)}, 6–3, 6–4
Victory	III	Doubles (with Marin Čilić)	Ecuador	Giovanni Lapentti / Nicolás Lapentti	7–6^{(7–3)}, 6–3, 7–5
▼2–3; 4–6 March 2011; Dom Sportova, Zagreb, Croatia; World Group First round; Hard surface
Defeat	III	Doubles (with Ivan Dodig)	Germany	Christopher Kas / Philipp Petzschner	3–6, 6–3, 7–5, 3–6, 4–6
Defeat	V	Singles	Germany	Philipp Petzschner	4–6, 6–7^{(3–7)}, 6–7^{(5–7)}
▲3–2; 10–12 February 2012; Bourbon Beans Dome, Kobe, Japan; World Group First round; Hard surface
Victory	II	Singles	Japan	Kei Nishikori	6–4, 6–4, 6–3
Victory	III	Doubles (with Ivan Dodig)	Japan	Tatsuma Ito / Yūichi Sugita	6–4, 6–4, 3–6, 6–3
Victory	V	Singles	Japan	Go Soeda	7–6^{(7–4)}, 6–1, 6–4
▼1–4; 6–8 April 2012; Parque Roca, Buenos Aires, Argentina; World Group Quarterfinals; Clay surface
Defeat	II	Singles	Argentina	Juan Martín del Potro	2–6, 6–7^{(7–9)}, 1–6
Defeat	III	Doubles (with Marin Čilić)	Argentina	David Nalbandian / Eduardo Schwank	6–3, 6–7^{(6–8)}, 3–6, 7–6^{(8–6)}, 6–8
▼2–3; 25–27 November 2016; Arena Zagreb, Zagreb, Croatia; World Group Final; Hard surface
Defeat	II	Singles	Argentina	Juan Martín del Potro	4–6, 7–6^{(8–6)}, 3–6, 5–7
Defeat	V	Singles	Argentina	Federico Delbonis	3–6, 4–6, 2–6

== Wins over top 10 players ==
- He has a 21–62 record against players who were, at the time the match was played, ranked in the top 10.

Season	2000	2001	2002	2003	2004	2005	2006	2007	2008	2009	2010	2011	2012	2013	2014	2015	2016	2017	2018	2019	2020	2021	Total
Wins	0	0	0	1	0	2	1	4	2	2	0	1	0	1	2	4	0	1	0	0	0	0	21

#	Player	Rank	Event	Surface	Rd	Score	IK Rank
2003
1.	(Australia) Lleyton Hewitt	2	Wimbledon, London, United Kingdom	Grass	1R	1–6, 7–6^{(7–5)}, 6–3, 6–4	203
2005
2.	(Australia) Lleyton Hewitt	2	Queen's Club, London, United Kingdom	Grass	QF	7–6^{(7–4)}, 6–3	77
3.	(United States) Andy Roddick	3	Madrid, Spain	Hard (i)	2R	3–6, 7–6^{(9–7)}, 7–6^{(7–3)}	86
2006
4.	(Russia) Nikolay Davydenko	6	Barcelona, Spain	Clay	2R	6–7^{(7–9)}, 7–5, 6–4	56
2007
5.	(United States) James Blake	6	San Jose, United States	Hard (i)	2R	6–7^{(4–7)}, 7–6^{(13–11)}, 6–4	103
6.	(Germany) Tommy Haas	10	Houston, United States	Clay	QF	7–6^{(9–7)}, 6–4	108
7.	(United States) James Blake	8	French Open, Paris, France	Clay	1R	4–6, 6–4, 7–5, 7–5	85
8.	(United States) James Blake	7	Basel, Switzerland	Hard (i)	2R	4–6, 7–6^{(7–4)}, 6–4	25
2008
9.	(Switzerland) Roger Federer	1	Cincinnati, United States	Hard	3R	7–6^{(8–6)}, 4–6, 7–6^{(7–5)}	22
10.	(Serbia) Novak Djokovic	3	Madrid, Spain	Hard (i)	3R	7–6^{(7–4)}, 7–6^{(7–5)}	21
2009
11.	(France) Jo-Wilfried Tsonga	9	Wimbledon, London, United Kingdom	Grass	3R	7–6^{(7–5)}, 6–7^{(5–7)}, 7–5, 7–6^{(7–5)}	36
12.	(Spain) Fernando Verdasco	8	Wimbledon, London, United Kingdom	Grass	4R	7–6^{(7–5)}, 6–7^{(4–7)}, 6–3, 7–6^{(11–9)}	36
2011
13.	(Spain) David Ferrer	6	Indian Wells, United States	Hard	2R	7–6^{(7–3)}, 6–3	239
2013
14.	(Czech Republic) Tomáš Berdych	7	Basel, Switzerland	Hard (i)	1R	4–6, 7–6^{(7–4)}, 7–6^{(7–2)}	83
2014
15.	(Czech Republic) Tomáš Berdych	7	Doha, Qatar	Hard	1R	7–6^{(9–7)}, 7–6^{(7–4)}	78
16.	(Croatia) Marin Čilić	9	Shanghai, China	Hard	1R	7–5, 2–6, 7–6^{(7–2)}	31
2015
17.	(Serbia) Novak Djokovic	1	Doha, Qatar	Hard	QF	6–7^{(2–7)}, 7–6^{(8–6)}, 6–4	27
18.	(Czech Republic) Tomáš Berdych	6	Halle, Germany	Grass	QF	7–5, 6–7^{(8–10)}, 6–3	27
19.	(Canada) Milos Raonic	10	Montreal, Canada	Hard	2R	7–6^{(7–1)}, 7–6^{(7–1)}	23
20.	(Switzerland) Stan Wawrinka	4	Basel, Switzerland	Hard (i)	1R	3–6, 7–6^{(7–2)}, 6–4	23
2017
21.	(Croatia) Marin Čilić	7	Rosmalen, Netherlands	Grass	SF	7–6^{(7–4)}, 5–7, 7–6^{(7–2)}	24

== See also ==
- Croatia Davis Cup team
- Fastest recorded tennis serves

Records
Preceded by (United States) Andy Roddick	Fastest serve world record holder 6 March 2011 – 12 May 2012	Succeeded by (Australia) Samuel Groth
