= 2001 Davis Cup Europe/Africa Zone Group III – Zone B =

International tennis competition

The Europe/Africa Zone was one of the three zones of the regional Davis Cup competition in 2001.

In the Europe/Africa Zone there were four different tiers, called groups, in which teams competed against each other to advance to the upper tier. The top two teams in Group III advanced to the Europe/Africa Zone Group II in 2001, whereas the bottom two teams were relegated to the Europe/Africa Zone Group IV in 2001.

== Participating nations ==
- Bosnia and Herzegovina
- Bulgaria
- Egypt
- Macedonia
- Mauritius
- Namibia
- Togo

=== Draw ===
- Venue: Rose Hill Club, Beau Bassin-Rose Hill, Mauritius
- Date: 23–27 May

Group A

| | BUL | MKD | NAM | TOG | RR; W–L | Match; W–L | Set; W–L | Standings |
| Bulgaria | | 3–0 | 3–0 | 3–0 | 3–0 | 9–0 (100%) | 27–6 (82%) | 1 |
| Macedonia | 0–3 | | 3–0 | 2–1 | 2–1 | 5–4 (56%) | 21–14 (60%) | 2 |
| Namibia | 0–3 | 0–3 | | 2–1 | 1–2 | 2–7 (22%) | 9–21 (30%) | 3 |
| Togo | 0–3 | 1–2 | 1–2 | | 0–3 | 2–7 (22%) | 7–23 (23%) | 4 |

Group B

| | EGY | BIH | MRI | RR; W–L | Match; W–L | Set; W–L | Standings |
| Egypt | | 2–1 | 3–0 | 2–0 | 5–1 (83%) | 16–5 (76%) | 1 |
| Bosnia and Herzegovina | 1–2 | | 3–0 | 1–1 | 4–2 (67%) | 13–9 (59%) | 2 |
| Mauritius | 0–3 | 0–3 | | 0–2 | 0–6 (0%) | 3–18 (14%) | 3 |

1st to 4th place play-offs

3rd-4th Play-off
B2 | Bosnia and Herzegovina | 2
A2 | Macedonia | 1

Semifinals
A1 | Bulgaria | 3
B2 | Bosnia and Herzegovina | 0
A2 | Macedonia | 1
B1 | Egypt | 2

Final
A1 | Bulgaria | 2
B1 | Egypt | 1

Relegation play-offs

| | | MRI | NAM | TOG | RR; W–L | Match; W–L | Set; W–L | Standings |
| B3 | Mauritius | | 3–0 | 2–1 | 2–0 | 5–1 (83%) | 14–4 (78%) | 1 |
| A3 | Namibia | 0–3 | | 2–1 | 1–1 | 2–4 (33%) | 6–10 (38%) | 2 |
| A4 | Togo | 1–2 | 1–2 | | 0–2 | 2–4 (33%) | 7–13 (35%) | 3 |

=== Final standings ===
| Rank | Team |
|---|---|
| 1 | Bulgaria |
| 2 | Egypt |
| 3 | Bosnia and Herzegovina |
| 4 | Macedonia |
| 5 | Mauritius |
| 6 | Namibia |
| 7 | Togo |

- Bulgaria and Egypt promoted to Group II in 2002.
- Togo relegated to Group IV in 2002.

== Round robin ==
=== Group A ===
==== Bulgaria vs. Namibia ====
Bulgaria
3
Rose Hill Club, Beau Bassin-Rose Hill, Mauritius
23 May 2001

Namibia
0

| | | | 1 | 2 | 3 | 4 | 5 |
|---|---|---|---|---|---|---|---|
| 1 | (Bulgaria) (Namibia) | Ivo Bratanov; Henrico Du Plessis | 5^{8} 4^{6} | 4; 0 | 4; 0 |
| 2 | (Bulgaria) (Namibia) | Milen Velev; Johan Theron | 4; 1 | 4; 0 | 4; 0 |
| 3 | (Bulgaria) (Namibia) | Ivo Bratanov / Todor Enev; Nicky Buys / Jean-Pierre Huish | 4; 0 | 4; 2 | 0; 4 | 4; 0 |

==== Togo vs. Macedonia ====
Togo
1
Rose Hill Club, Beau Bassin-Rose Hill, Mauritius
23 May 2001

Macedonia
2

| | | | 1 | 2 | 3 | 4 | 5 |
|---|---|---|---|---|---|---|---|
| 1 | (Togo) (North Macedonia) | Kwami Gakpo; Goran Sterijovski | 0; 4 | 2; 4 | 1; 4 |
| 2 | (Togo) (North Macedonia) | Komlavi Loglo; Predrag Rusevski | 4; 2 | 1; 4 | 4; 2 | 1; 4 | 8; 6 |
| 3 | (Togo) (North Macedonia) | Kwami Gakpo / Komlavi Loglo; Predrag Rusevski / Goran Sterijovski | 1; 4 | 1; 4 | 2; 4 |

==== Bulgaria vs. Togo ====
Bulgaria
3
Rose Hill Club, Beau Bassin-Rose Hill, Mauritius
24 May 2001

Togo
0

| | | | 1 | 2 | 3 | 4 | 5 |
|---|---|---|---|---|---|---|---|
| 1 | (Bulgaria) (Togo) | Todor Enev; Kwami Gakpo | 4; 0 | 4; 1 | 4; 0 |
| 2 | (Bulgaria) (Togo) | Milen Velev; Komlavi Loglo | 5; 3 | 4; 0 | 4; 2 |
| 3 | (Bulgaria) (Togo) | Ivo Bratanov / Victor Ivanchev; Kwami Gakpo / Komlavi Loglo | 2; 4 | 4; 2 | 5^{7} 4^{5} | 4; 2 |

==== Namibia vs. Macedonia ====
Namibia
0
Rose Hill Club, Beau Bassin-Rose Hill, Mauritius
24 May 2001

Macedonia
3

| | | | 1 | 2 | 3 | 4 | 5 |
|---|---|---|---|---|---|---|---|
| 1 | (Namibia) (North Macedonia) | Henrico Du Plessis; Goran Sterijovski | 4; 2 | 2; 4 | 2; 4 | 2; 4 |
| 2 | (Namibia) (North Macedonia) | Johan Theron; Predrag Rusevski | 1; 4 | 1; 4 | 1; 4 |
| 3 | (Namibia) (North Macedonia) | Nicky Buys / Jean-Pierre Huish; Dimitar Grabul / Kristian Mitrovski | 1; 4 | 2; 4 | 4; 2 | 2; 4 |

==== Bulgaria vs. Macedonia ====
Bulgaria
3
Rose Hill Club, Beau Bassin-Rose Hill, Mauritius
25 May 2001

Macedonia
0

| | | | 1 | 2 | 3 | 4 | 5 |
|---|---|---|---|---|---|---|---|
| 1 | (Bulgaria) (North Macedonia) | Todor Enev; Goran Sterijovski | 4; 2 | 4; 2 | 4; 2 |
| 2 | (Bulgaria) (North Macedonia) | Milen Velev; Predrag Rusevski | 4; 2 | 4^{4} 5^{7} | 1; 4 | 5^{7} 4^{3} | 8; 6 |
| 3 | (Bulgaria) (North Macedonia) | Ivo Bratanov / Victor Ivanchev; Dimitar Grabul / Kristian Mitrovski | 5^{7} 4^{3} | 1; 4 | 4; 0 | 4^{5} 5^{7} | 5^{7} 4^{3} |

==== Togo vs. Namibia ====
Togo
1
Rose Hill Club, Beau Bassin-Rose Hill, Mauritius
25 May 2001

Namibia
2

| | | | 1 | 2 | 3 | 4 | 5 |
|---|---|---|---|---|---|---|---|
| 1 | (Togo) (Namibia) | Kwami Gakpo; Henrico Du Plessis | 2; 4 | 1; 4 | 1; 4 |
| 2 | (Togo) (Namibia) | Komlavi Loglo; Johan Theron | 5; 3 | 5; 3 | 5; 3 |
| 3 | (Togo) (Namibia) | Kwami Gakpo / Komlavi Loglo; Henrico Du Plessis / Johan Theron | 3; 5 | 0; 4 | 1; 4 |

=== Group B ===
==== Bosnia and Herzegovina vs. Egypt ====
Bosnia and Herzegovina
1
Rose Hill Club, Beau Bassin-Rose Hill, Mauritius
23 May 2001

Egypt
2

| | | | 1 | 2 | 3 | 4 | 5 |
|---|---|---|---|---|---|---|---|
| 1 | (Bosnia and Herzegovina) (Egypt) | Igor Račić; Hisham Hemeda | 2; 4 | 2; 4 | 1; 4 |
| 2 | (Bosnia and Herzegovina) (Egypt) | Haris Bašalić; Amr Ghoneim | 4^{4} 5^{7} | 5; 3 | 4; 1 | 5; 3 |
| 3 | (Bosnia and Herzegovina) (Egypt) | Haris Bašalić / Igor Račić; Hisham Hemeda / Marwan Zewar | 1; 4 | 4; 1 | 2; 4 | 1; 4 |

==== Bosnia and Herzegovina vs. Mauritius ====
Bosnia and Herzegovina
3
Rose Hill Club, Beau Bassin-Rose Hill, Mauritius
24 May 2001

Mauritius
0

| | | | 1 | 2 | 3 | 4 | 5 |
|---|---|---|---|---|---|---|---|
| 1 | (Bosnia and Herzegovina) (Mauritius) | Igor Račić; Guillaume Desvaux | 4; 1 | 4; 0 | 4; 1 |
| 2 | (Bosnia and Herzegovina) (Mauritius) | Haris Bašalić; Jean-Marcel Bourgault du Coudray | 4; 2 | 4^{2} 5^{7} | 4; 1 | 4; 2 |
| 3 | (Bosnia and Herzegovina) (Mauritius) | Aleksandar Antonijević / Vladimir Arapović; Jean-Marcel Bourgault du Coudray / Olivier Couacaud | 4; 2 | 5; 3 | 1; 4 | 4; 2 |

==== Egypt vs. Mauritius ====
Egypt
3
Rose Hill Club, Beau Bassin-Rose Hill, Mauritius
25 May 2001

Mauritius
0

| | | | 1 | 2 | 3 | 4 | 5 |
|---|---|---|---|---|---|---|---|
| 1 | (Egypt) (Mauritius) | Marwan Zewar; Olivier Couacaud | 5; 3 | 4; 2 | 5^{7} 4^{3} |
| 2 | (Egypt) (Mauritius) | Hisham Hemeda; Jean-Marcel Bourgault du Coudray | 4; 2 | 5^{7} 4^{3} | 4; 1 |
| 3 | (Egypt) (Mauritius) | Amr Ghoneim / Mohamed Mamoun; Wong-Kee Chuan / Guillaume Desvaux | 1; 4 | 4; 0 | 4; 1 | 4; 2 |

== 1st to 4th place play-offs ==
=== Semifinals ===
==== Bulgaria vs. Bosnia and Herzegovina ====
Bulgaria
3
Rose Hill Club, Beau Bassin-Rose Hill, Mauritius
26 May 2001

Bosnia and Herzegovina
0

| | | | 1 | 2 | 3 | 4 | 5 |
|---|---|---|---|---|---|---|---|
| 1 | (Bulgaria) (Bosnia and Herzegovina) | Todor Enev; Igor Račić | 4; 2 | 4; 2 | 5; 3 |
| 2 | (Bulgaria) (Bosnia and Herzegovina) | Milen Velev; Haris Bašalić | 4; 0 | 5; 3 | 4; 1 |
| 3 | (Bulgaria) (Bosnia and Herzegovina) | Ivo Bratanov / Todor Enev; Aleksandar Antonijević / Vladimir Arapović | 4; 0 | 4; 1 | 4; 1 |

==== Egypt vs. Macedonia ====
Egypt
2
Rose Hill Club, Beau Bassin-Rose Hill, Mauritius
26 May 2001

Macedonia
1

| | | | 1 | 2 | 3 | 4 | 5 |
|---|---|---|---|---|---|---|---|
| 1 | (Egypt) (North Macedonia) | Marwan Zewar; Kristian Mitrovski | 4; 0 | 4; 2 | 5; 3 |
| 2 | (Egypt) (North Macedonia) | Hisham Hemeda; Goran Sterijovski | 4; 2 | 5^{7} 4^{2} | 4; 1 |
| 3 | (Egypt) (North Macedonia) | Amr Ghoneim / Mohamed Mamoun; Dimitar Grabul / Kristian Mitrovski | 4; 2 | 4; 2 | 2; 4 | 1; 4 | 3; 5 |

=== Final ===
==== Bulgaria vs. Egypt ====
Bulgaria
2
Rose Hill Club, Beau Bassin-Rose Hill, Mauritius
27 May 2001

Egypt
1

| | | | 1 | 2 | 3 | 4 | 5 |
|---|---|---|---|---|---|---|---|
| 1 | (Bulgaria) (Egypt) | Victor Ivanchev; Mohamed Mamoun | 4; 2 | 3; 5 | 5; 3 | 0; 4 | 0; 4 |
| 2 | (Bulgaria) (Egypt) | Ivo Bratanov; Amr Ghoneim | 5; 3 | 4; 1 | 1; 4 | 4; 1 |
| 3 | (Bulgaria) (Egypt) | Todor Enev / Milen Velev; Mohamed Mamoun / Marwan Zewar | 4; 2 | 4; 2 | 4; 1 |

=== 3rd to 4th play-off ===
==== Bosnia and Herzegovina vs. Macedonia ====
Bosnia and Herzegovina
2
Rose Hill Club, Beau Bassin-Rose Hill, Mauritius
27 May 2001

Macedonia
1

| | | | 1 | 2 | 3 | 4 | 5 |
|---|---|---|---|---|---|---|---|---|
| 1 | (Bosnia and Herzegovina) (North Macedonia) | Igor Račić; Dimitar Grabul | 4^{4} 5^{7} | 5; 3 | 4; 1 | 4; 2 |
| 2 | (Bosnia and Herzegovina) (North Macedonia) | Haris Bašalić; Kristian Mitrovski | 5^{7} 4^{1} | | | | | retired |
| 3 | (Bosnia and Herzegovina) (North Macedonia) | Vladimir Arapović / Igor Račić; Dimitar Grabul / Kristian Mitrovski | 4; 2 | 4; 2 | 2; 4 | 4; 2 |

== Relegation play-offs ==
=== Round robin ===
==== Mauritius vs. Namibia ====
Mauritius
3
Rose Hill Club, Beau Bassin-Rose Hill, Mauritius
26 May 2001

Namibia
0

| | | | 1 | 2 | 3 | 4 | 5 |
|---|---|---|---|---|---|---|---|---|
| 1 | (Mauritius) (Namibia) | Olivier Couacaud; Jean-Pierre Huish | 5^{7} 4^{4} | 4; 2 | 4; 1 |
| 2 | (Mauritius) (Namibia) | Jean-Marcel Bourgault du Coudray; Johan Theron | 4; 1 | 3; 0 | | | | retired |
| 3 | (Mauritius) (Namibia) | Jean-Marcel Bourgault du Coudray / Olivier Couacaud; Nicky Buys / Henrico Du Plessis | 4; 1 | 5; 3 | 4; 2 |

==== Togo vs. Mauritius ====
Togo
1
Rose Hill Club, Beau Bassin-Rose Hill, Mauritius
27 May 2001

Mauritius
2

| | | | 1 | 2 | 3 | 4 | 5 |
|---|---|---|---|---|---|---|---|
| 1 | (Togo) (Mauritius) | Kwami Gakpo; Olivier Couacaud | 0; 4 | 4^{4} 5^{7} | 5; 3 | 2; 4 |
| 2 | (Togo) (Mauritius) | Komlavi Loglo; Jean-Marcel Bourgault du Coudray | 4; 0 | 5^{7} 4^{4} | 4^{1} 5^{7} | 5; 3 |
| 3 | (Togo) (Mauritius) | Kwami Gakpo / Gadonfin Koptigan Yaka; Wong-Kee Chuan / Guillaume Desvaux | 0; 4 | 2; 4 | 3; 5 |
