= Krystian Pfeiffer =

Polish tennis player

- Country (sports): Poland
- Born: 3 December 1978 (age 47)
- Plays: Right-handed
- Prize money: $20,974

Singles
- Career record: 4–3 (ATP Tour & Davis Cup)
- Highest ranking: No. 394 (18 Sep 2000)

Doubles
- Highest ranking: No. 1189 (19 Sep 2000)

Krystian Pfeiffer (born 3 December 1978) is a Polish former professional tennis player.

Pfeiffer, a native of Bolesławiec, was the Polish national champion in 2000 and 2001.

On the ATP Tour, he appeared as a wildcard in the main draw of the 2001 Idea Prokom Open and claimed a set against third seed Tommy Robredo in his first round loss.

Pfeiffer had a stint playing collegiate tennis in the United States for Southern Methodist University and was named WAC Player of the Year in 2002.

During his career he played in the occasional Davis Cup tie for Poland and won four of his six singles rubbers, with his wins coming against Nortey Dowuona, Mait Künnap, Andrej Kračman and Dušan Vemić.

== ITF Futures titles ==
=== Singles: (1) ===
No.	Date	Tournament	Surface	Opponent	Score
1.	Aug 2000	Poland F4, Łódź	Clay	(Australia) Jurek Stasiak	6–3, 7–6^{(4)}

== See also ==
- List of Poland Davis Cup team representatives
