= Krzysztof Kwinta =

Polish tennis player and coach (born 1980)

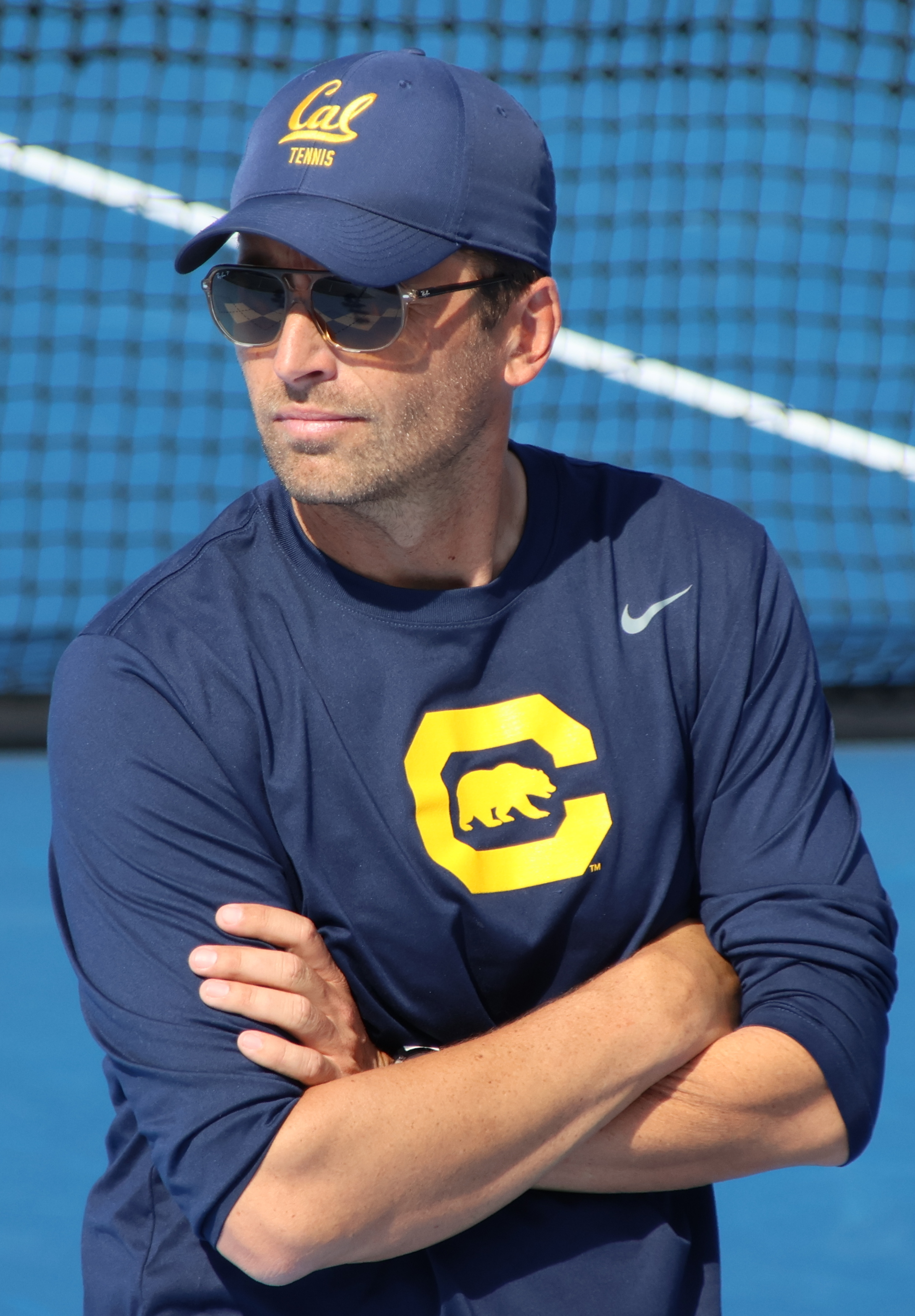
- Kwinta with Cal in 2026
- Full name: Krzysztof Filip Kwinta
- Country (sports): Poland
- Born: 28 February 1980 (age 46)
- Height: 6 ft 3 in (191 cm)
- Plays: Right-handed
- Prize money: $15,994

Singles
- Highest ranking: No. 804 (23 Jul 2001)

Doubles
- Career record: 1–2 (ATP Tour & Davis Cup)
- Highest ranking: No. 466 (19 Mar 2001)

Krzysztof Filip Kwinta (born 28 February 1980) is a Polish tennis coach and former professional player who is the head coach of the California Golden Bears men's tennis team.

A two-time Polish national champion in doubles, Kwinta is a native of Poznań and was a member of the Poland Davis Cup team in 2000. He featured in the doubles rubber of a tie against Slovenia in Szczecin, where he and partner Marcin Matkowski defeated Andrej Kračman and Marko Tkalec. On the ATP Tour, he made two main draw appearances in doubles at the local Idea Prokom Open.

Kwinta, who is also known by the given name "Kris", played one season of college tennis for the Tennessee Volunteers and two seasons for the UCLA Bruins, where he was a doubles All-American in 2004. He won the deciding match for the Bruins of the 2005 NCAA Division I Championship final over Baylor's Lars Pörschke.

Kwinta became an assistant coach for the UCLA Bruins under head coach Billy Martin in 2008. After four years, he moved to the USC Trojans in the same role under Peter Smith in 2012. He was promoted associate head coach for the Trojans in 2014. He was briefly the interim head coach following Smith's retirement before USC hired Brett Masi in 2019. After nine years at USC, he became the head coach for the California Golden Bears in 2021.

== ITF Futures titles ==
=== Doubles: (3) ===
No.	Date	Tournament	Surface	Partner	Opponents	Score
1.	Jul 2000	Poland F3, Katowice	Clay	(Poland) Marcin Matkowski	(Poland) Maciej Domka (Russia) Yuri Schukin	6–3, 7–5
2.	Aug 2001	Poland F1, Poznań	Clay	(Poland) Filip Aniola	(Germany) Ralph Grambow (Germany) Florian Kunth	6–3, 2–6, 6–3
3.	Sep 2004	Poland F6, Wrocław	Clay	(Poland) Marcin Golab	(Poland) Piotr Olechowski (Poland) Dawid Olejniczak	7–6^{(4)}, 7–6^{(2)}

== See also ==
- List of Poland Davis Cup team representatives
