= 2011 Royal Bank of Scotland Challenger – Singles =

Tennis tournament won by Ivo Karlović

Singles
- 2011 Royal Bank of Scotland Challenger

Final
- Champion: (Croatia) Ivo Karlović
- Runner-up: (United States) Sam Querrey
- Score: 6–7^{(2–7)}, 6–1, 6–4

Events
Singles	Doubles
← 2010 ·	Royal Bank of Scotland Challenger	· 2012 →

Tobias Kamke was the defending champion but decided not to participate.
Ivo Karlović won the tournament after defeating Sam Querrey 6–7^{(2–7)}, 6–1, 6–4 in the final.

== Seeds ==
1. (United States) Ryan Sweeting (semifinals)
2. (Croatia) Ivo Karlović (champion)
3. (United States) Sam Querrey (final)
4. (United States) Bobby Reynolds (second round)
5. (Canada) Vasek Pospisil (quarterfinals)
6. (South Africa) Izak van der Merwe (first round)
7. (United States) Wayne Odesnik (second round)
8. (Germany) Björn Phau (semifinals)

== Draw ==
=== Key ===
- Q = Qualifier
- WC = Wild card
- LL = Lucky loser
- Alt = Alternate
- SE = Special exempt
- PR = Protected ranking
- ITF = ITF entry
- JE = Junior exempt
- w/o = Walkover
- r = Retired
- d = Defaulted
- SR = Special ranking

=== Finals ===
Semifinals
1	(United States) Ryan Sweeting	4	3
3	(United States) Sam Querrey	6	6
8	(Germany) Björn Phau	5	5
2	(Croatia) Ivo Karlović	7	7

Final
3	(United States) Sam Querrey	7^{7}	1	4
2	(Croatia) Ivo Karlović	6^{2}	6	6

=== Top half ===
First round
1	(United States) R Sweeting	4	6	6
WC	(United States) S Johnson	6	2	2
(Australia) C Guccione	6^{1}	3
Q	(United Kingdom) A Bogdanovic	7^{7}	6
(Colombia) JS Cabal	6	4	6^{6}
(Moldova) R Borvanov	1	6	7^{8}
WC	(United States) D Kudla	5	0^{r}
5	(Canada) V Pospisil	7	2
3	(United States) S Querrey	6	6
(South Africa) F Wolmarans	4	4
Q	(New Zealand) A Sitak	6	4	2
(Bosnia and Herzegovina) A Delić	4	6	6
Q	(Canada) P-L Duclos	7	1	3
(Belarus) U Ignatik	5	6	6
SE	(United States) A Kuznetsov	6	4	7
6	(South Africa) I van der Merwe	4	6	5

Second round
1	(United States) R Sweeting	6	6
Q	(United Kingdom) A Bogdanovic	2	1
(Moldova) R Borvanov	3	0
5	(Canada) V Pospisil	6	6
3	(United States) S Querrey	6	6
(Bosnia and Herzegovina) A Delić	4	2
(Belarus) U Ignatik	6^{8}	5
SE	(United States) A Kuznetsov	7^{10}	7

Quarterfinals
1	(United States) R Sweeting	6	3	6
5	(Canada) V Pospisil	2	6	1
3	(United States) S Querrey	6	6
SE	(United States) A Kuznetsov	1	4

Semifinals
1	(United States) R Sweeting	4	3
3	(United States) S Querrey	6	6

=== Bottom half ===
First round
8	(Germany) B Phau	4	7^{7}	6
(Australia) G Jones	6	6^{5}	1
WC	(United States) J Sock	6	0	3
Q	(Colombia) A González	4	6	6
(Lithuania) L Grigelis	6	6
(Denmark) F Nielsen	3	3
(South Africa) R Klaasen	4	3
4	(United States) B Reynolds	6	6
7	(United States) W Odesnik	6
(Netherlands) T de Bakker	1	r
(Austria) M Fischer	6	6
(Germany) S Greul	3	3
WC	(United States) D Kosakowski	4	6	6^{4}
Alt	(Colombia) R Farah	6	4	7^{7}
(Germany) D Gremelmayr	7^{7}	1^{r}
2	(Croatia) I Karlović	6^{4}	2

Second round
8	(Germany) B Phau	6	6
Q	(Colombia) A González	2	2
(Lithuania) L Grigelis	7^{7}	3	6
4	(United States) B Reynolds	6^{3}	6	4
7	(United States) W Odesnik	7^{8}	3	1
(Austria) M Fischer	6^{6}	6	6
Alt	(Colombia) R Farah	6^{2}	2
2	(Croatia) I Karlović	7^{7}	6

Quarterfinals
8	(Germany) B Phau	6	6
(Lithuania) L Grigelis	3	2
(Austria) M Fischer	5	6	3
2	(Croatia) I Karlović	7	4	6

Semifinals
8	(Germany) B Phau	5	5
2	(Croatia) I Karlović	7	7
