= Patrik Langvardt =

Danish tennis player

- Country (sports): Denmark
- Residence: Höllviken, Sweden
- Born: 6 December 1971 (age 53)
- Plays: Right-handed
- Prize money: $25,454

Singles
- Career record: 1–6
- Highest ranking: No. 338 (1 Nov 1993)

Grand Slam singles results
- Wimbledon: Q1 (1995)
- US Open: Q1 (1994)

Doubles
- Career record: 0–2
- Highest ranking: No. 436 (23 Sep 1996)

Patrik Langvardt (born 6 December 1971) is a former professional tennis player from Denmark.

== Career ==
Langvardt represented Denmark in the Davis Cup competition from 2000 until 2002. He made his debut in 2000 during the Europe/Africa Zone Group II, second round against the Ivory Coast. Langvardt played in four Davis Cup ties, winning 2 of the 4 singles matches and the one doubles match, that he played.

After retiring from professional tennis, Langvardt began coaching tennis. He started a tennis academy at the Trelleborg Tennis Club in Sweden and since 2012 he has been the coach of the Danish player, Frederik Nielsen.

== See also ==
- List of Denmark Davis Cup team representatives
