= List of Poland Davis Cup team representatives =

This is a list of tennis players who have represented the Poland Davis Cup team in an official Davis Cup match. Poland have taken part in the competition since 1925.

== Players ==
Player	W-L (Total)	W-L (Singles)	W-L (Doubles)	Ties	Debut
Filip Aniola	2–1	2–0	0–1	2	1997
Adam Baworowski	2–3	2–2	0–1	2	1939
Wiesław Bielanowicz	0–4	0–2	0–2	2	1962
Lech Bienkowski	5–10	3–6	2–4	6	1983
Walenty Bratek	1–0	0–0	1–0	1	1935
Adam Chadaj	2–0	2–0	0–0	1	2005
Michał Chmela	7–8	4–4	3–4	8	1996
Jan Chytrowski	0–2	0–0	0–2	2	1950
Stanisław Czetwertyński	0–4	0–4	0–0	2	1926
Bartłomiej Dąbrowski	37–25	28–19	9–6	30	1991
Czesław Dobrowolski	1–5	1–5	0–0	3	1976
Henryk Drzymalski	5–17	4–13	1–4	11	1975
Wojciech Fibak	28–12	19–5	9–7	17	1972
Alfons Foerster	0–2	0–2	0–0	1	1925
Mariusz Fyrstenberg	29–14	7–7	22–7	33	2001
Wiesław Gąsiorek	25–24	19–18	6–6	21	1959
Michał Gawłowski	6–4	3–2	3–2	5	1996
Marcin Gawron	0–1	0–1	0–0	1	2011
Józef Hebda	14–18	13–9	1–9	15	1931
Tomasz Iwański	12–6	8–3	4–3	10	1989
Piotr Jamroz	2–2	2–2	0–0	2	1966
Wojciech Jamroz	1–2	0–1	1–1	2	1986
Jerzy Janowicz	21–11	21–11	0–0	16	2008
Jerzy Jasiński	0–1	0–0	0–1	1	1976
Bernard Kaczorowski	1–0	0–0	1–0	1	1997
Edward Kleinadel	0–6	0–4	0–2	2	1926
Błażej Koniusz	0–2	0–2	0–0	1	2008
Maciej Kost	2–3	2–2	0–1	2	1994
Wojciech Kowalski	23–15	16–8	7–7	14	1984
Łukasz Kubot	26–10	19–10	7–0	25	2001
Władysław Kuchar	0–1	0–0	0–1	1	1925
Krzysztof Kwinta	1–0	0–0	1–0	1	2000
Bronisław Lewandowski	2–2	1–2	1–0	2	1967
Tomasz Lichon	3–3	2–3	1–0	3	1992
Andrzej Licis	10–9	10–9	0–0	10	1956
Jan Loth	0–1	0–0	0–1	1	1929
Kamil Majchrzak	0–1	0–1	0–0	1	2015
Tomasz Maliszewski	1–0	0–0	1–0	1	1988
Marcin Matkowski	29–10	4–2	25–8	33	2000
Witold Meres	1–2	1–1	0–1	1	1982
Jacek Niedźwiedzki	6–9	4–5	2–4	9	1971
Radosław Nijaki	3–0	1–0	2–0	2	2000
Tadeusz Nowicki	18–28	7–15	11–13	25	1965
Wiesław Nowicki	3–2	1–1	2–1	4	1961
Darek Nowicki	4–3	2–3	2–0	3	1991
Dawid Olejniczak	3–2	3–2	0–0	3	2007
Józef Orlikowski	4–3	2–2	2–1	4	1961
Pawel Ostrowski	0–1	0–0	0–1	1	1994
Grzegorz Panfil	3–3	3–2	0–1	3	2009
Krystian Pfeiffer	4–2	4–2	0–0	4	1997
Józef Piątek	8–17	5–5	3–12	16	1950
Michał Przysiężny	12–13	12–13	0–0	16	2004
Jan Radzio	0–7	0–2	0–5	6	1951
Waldemar Rogowski	3–9	3–9	0–0	6	1983
Marcin Rozpedski	0–1	0–0	0–1	1	1995
Mieczysław Rybarczyk	5–4	4–2	1–2	4	1965
Lech Sidor	3–3	2–1	1–2	4	1988
Władysław Skonecki	26–20	23–13	3–7	21	1947
Adam Skrzypczak	3–2	3–2	0–0	3	1996
Robert Sliwinski	0–1	0–1	0–0	1	1992
Czesław Spychała	0–1	0–0	0–1	1	1938
Jurek Stasiak	2–2	2–1	0–1	2	1998
Karol Steinert	0–2	0–0	0–2	2	1925
Jerzy Stolarow	0–6	0–2	0–4	4	1927
Maksymilian Stolarow	4–12	3–7	1–5	9	1928
Piotr Szczepanik	0–3	0–3	0–0	3	1998
Stanisław Szczukiewicz	0–3	0–2	0–1	1	1963
Władysław Szwede	0–2	0–2	0–0	1	1925
Kazimierz Tarlowski	5–4	4–3	1–1	5	1935
Andrzej Tarnowski	0–2	0–2	0–0	1	1929
Ignacy Tłoczyński	26–17	23–8	3–9	18	1930
Filip Urban	4–1	1–1	3–0	5	2002
Przemysław Warmiński	0–4	0–2	0–2	3	1928
Andrzej Wisnieski	0–1	0–1	0–0	1	1980
Ernest Wittmann	1–1	0–0	1–1	2	1934
Mariusz Zielinski	0–1	0–1	0–0	1	1999
