= Jurek Stasiak =

Australian-Polish tennis player

- Full name: Jurek Stasiak
- Country (sports): Australia; Poland
- Born: 23 April 1978 (age 47) Gdańsk, Poland
- Plays: Right-handed
- Prize money: $37,058

Singles
- Career record: 0–1
- Highest ranking: No. 213 (13 April 1998)

Grand Slam singles results
- Australian Open: 1R (1998)

Doubles
- Highest ranking: No. 536 (25 May 1998)

Jurek Stasiak (born 23 April 1978) is a former professional tennis player from Australia.

== Biography ==
Born in Gdańsk, Stasiak emigrated from Poland to Australia with his family in 1985. He grew up in Parramatta and started playing tennis at the age of nine, along with his identical twin brother Wojtek. The brothers were coached by their father Bogdan and became highly ranked Australian juniors, featuring together in the Junior Davis Cup in 1994.

Stasiak, a right-handed player, began playing Challenger tournaments in 1996. He took part in the qualifying draw for the Australian Open for three years without success before being granted a wildcard spot into the 1998 Australian Open. In the first round he lost a five-set match to American Vince Spadea. Later in the year he represented the Poland Davis Cup team in ties against Senegal and Egypt.

His brother Wojtek went missing in 2001, aged 23. He left the family home and hasn't been seen since. After he went missing, posters were put up in the local area, which prompted people to report sightings, not realising they had instead spotted his identical twin. In 2008 Wojtek was declared deceased by a NSW coroner.

== See also ==
- List of Poland Davis Cup team representatives
