= Michał Gawłowski =

Polish tennis player and coach

- Country (sports): Poland
- Born: 28 July 1975 (age 50)
- Prize money: $20,314

Singles
- Highest ranking: No. 769 (27 Aug 2001)

Doubles
- Career record: 0–2
- Highest ranking: No. 425 (16 Aug 1999)

Michał Gawłowski (born 28 July 1975) is a Polish tennis coach and former professional player.

A national junior champion in 1992 and 1993 ( singles, doubles and mixed), Gawłowski competed for the Poland Davis Cup team between 1996 and 1999, winning three singles and three doubles rubbers. His first singles win came in 1996 against Slovakia's Dominik Hrbatý and in 1999 he won the deciding fifth rubber of a tie against Latvia.

Gawłowski was the singles runner-up at the Polish national tennis championships on three occasions. He won three national indoor doubles titles, in 1995, 1997 and 1999.

On the ATP Tour, Gawłowski featured twice in the doubles main draw of the Sopot tournament.

== Challenger titles ==
=== Doubles: (1) ===
No.	Year	Tournament	Surface	Partner	Opponents	Score
1.	1999	Sopot, Poland	Clay	(Poland) Bartlomiej Dabrowski	(Czech Republic) Daniel Fiala (Czech Republic) Jiri Hobler	6–4, 3–6, 6–3

== See also ==
- List of Poland Davis Cup team representatives
