= Bartłomiej Dąbrowski =

Polish tennis player

- Full name: Bartłomiej Dąbrowski
- Country (sports): Poland
- Born: 20 August 1972 (age 53)
- Prize money: $92,858

Singles
- Career record: 5–10
- Career titles: 0
- Highest ranking: No. 211 (17 July 1995)

Doubles
- Career record: 2–6
- Career titles: 0
- Highest ranking: No. 295 (8 March 2004)

Bartłomiej Dąbrowski (born 20 August 1972) is a former professional tennis player from Poland.

== Biography ==
Dąbrowski holds the record of most overall matches won and most individual wins for the Poland Davis Cup team. From 1991 to 2004 he took part in a total of 30 ties, for a 37-25 overall record, 28-19 in singles. He won a marathon match against Hungary's László Markovits in Budapest in 1992, which went to 14–12 in the fifth set, after three of the previous sets were decided by tie breakers. His Davis Cup career also included a win over Max Mirnyi and a doubles victory over a Cypriot pairing featuring Marcos Baghdatis. He was honoured with a Davis Cup Commitment Award in 2013.

All of his main draw ATP Tour appearances were at the Prokom Open in Sopot. Every year from 2001 to 2004 he featured in the doubles competition. He played singles in 2002, eliminated in the first round by Mikhail Youzhny, then again in 2003, when he came up against world number two Juan Carlos Ferrero, for another opening round exit. His two ATP Challenger titles, both in doubles, were also in Sopot tournaments.

He was announced in 2010 as the new coach of Polish player Marta Domachowska.

== Challenger titles ==
=== Doubles: (2) ===
No.	Year	Tournament	Surface	Partner	Opponents	Score
1.	1999	Sopot, Poland	Clay	(Poland) Michał Gawłowski	(Czech Republic) Daniel Fiala (Czech Republic) Jiri Hobler	6–4, 3–6, 6–3
2.	2001	Sopot, Poland	Clay	(Poland) Marcin Matkowski	(Spain) Óscar Hernández (Russia) Dmitry Vlasov	6–72, 6–4, 6–3

== See also ==
- List of Poland Davis Cup team representatives
