= Scott Barron (tennis) =

Irish tennis player

Barron, Scott
- Country (sports): Ireland
- Residence: Dublin, Ireland
- Born: 27 August 1974 (age 50); Dublin, Ireland
- Height: 5 ft 11 in (180 cm)
- Plays: Right-handed
- Prize money: US$34,262

Singles
- Career record: 2–4
- Career titles: 0
- Highest ranking: No. 263 (19 March 2001)

Doubles
- Career record: 2–2
- Career titles: 0
- Highest ranking: No. 390 (1 December 1997)

Scott Barron (born 27 August 1974 in Dublin, Ireland) is a male former tennis player from Ireland.

Barron represented Ireland in the doubles competition at the 1996 Summer Olympics in Atlanta, partnering Owen Casey. The pair was eliminated in the first round there. The right-hander Barron represented Ireland in the Davis Cup from 1993 to 2001, posting an 11–11 record in singles and a 6–2 record in doubles in seventeen ties played. Barron's highest ranking in singles was World No. 263, which he reached on 19 March 2001. His highest doubles ranking was World No. 390, which he reached on 1 December 1997.

== Tour singles titles – all levels (2–3) ==
Legend (Singles)
Grand Slam (0–0)
Tennis Masters Cup (0–0)
ATP Masters Series (0–0)
ATP Tour (0–0)
Challengers (0–0)
Futures (2–3)

Outcome	No.	Date	Tournament	Surface	Opponent in the final	Score
Winner	1.	20 March 2000	Shirako, Japan	Grass	(Slovakia) Martin Hromec	7–6, 6–4
Runner-up	1.	15 May 2000	Schwaz, Austria	Carpet	(Denmark) Kristian Pless	3–6, 5–7
Runner-up	2.	12 June 2000	(United States) Berkeley, U.S.	Hard	(United States) Alex Kim	3–6, 5–7
Runner-up	3.	19 June 2000	(United States) Redding, U.S.	Hard	(United States) Zack Fleishman	4–6, 3–6
Winner	2.	30 October 2000	(United States) Hattiesburg, U.S.	Hard	(Russia) Dmitry Tursunov	6–7, 7–6, 6–3
