= Helge Koll-Frafjord =

Norwegian tennis player

- Country (sports): Norway
- Residence: Norway
- Born: 31 May 1975 (age 49)
- Plays: Right-handed
- Prize money: $36,761

Singles
- Career record: 4–11
- Highest ranking: No. 300 (18 Sep 2000)

Grand Slam singles results
- US Open: Q1 (2000)

Doubles
- Career record: 3–7
- Highest ranking: No. 476 (26 Oct 1998)

Helge Koll-Frafjord (born 31 May 1975) is a former tennis player from Norway.

== Tennis career ==
Koll-Frafjord participated at the 1993 Junior Wimbledon Championship and he made his debut for the Norway Davis Cup team in 1993 against Finland. Koll-Frafjord had a 12-year Davis Cup career and he won 5 of the 17 singles matches and 4 of the 11 doubles matches that he played.

Koll-Frafjord mainly participated on the ATP Challenger Tour and the Futures circuit. He won three singles titles and three doubles titles on the Futures circuit.

== ITF Futures titles ==
=== Singles: 3 ===
No.	Date	Tournament	Tier	Surface	Opponent	Score
1.	Sep 1999	Sweden F1, Gothenburg	Futures	Hard (i)	(Sweden) Kalle Flygt	3–6, 6–4, 6–1
2.	Feb 2000	Great Britain F1, Eastbourne	Futures	Carpet (i)	(Croatia) Ivo Karlović	7–6^{(7–4)}, 7–6^{(7–2)}
3.	Sep 2000	Sweden F1, Gothenburg	Futures	Carpet (i)	(Sweden) Kalle Flygt	3–6, 6–2, 6–4

=== Doubles: 3 ===
No.	Date	Tournament	Tier	Surface	Partner	Opponents	Score
1.	Aug 1998	Croatia F5, Umag	Futures	Clay	(Sweden) Simon Aspelin	(Croatia) Ivo Karlović (Croatia) Lovro Zovko	7–5, 6–4
2.	Sep 1998	Norway F1, Oslo	Futures	Carpet (i)	(Norway) Lars Hjarrand	(United States) Ben Gabler (United States) Arvid Swan	6–1, 3–6, 6–3
3.	Feb 2000	Great Britain F1, Eastbourne	Futures	Carpet (i)	(Sweden) Henrik Andersson	(United Kingdom) Oliver Freelove (United Kingdom) Tom Spinks	7–5, 7–5

== See also ==
- Norwegian Davis Cup players
