= Amr Ghoneim =

Egyptian tennis player

Amr Ghoneim (Arabic:عمرو غنيم) is a former tennis player

== Rankings ==
Career High ATP ranking - Singles: 261 (30-Oct-00)
Career High Stanford ATP Doubles Ranking: 320 (13-Nov-00)

== Davis Cup Statistics ==
He has the all-time Egyptian records for Davis cup ties played: 29
He has the all-time Egyptian records for Davis cup years played: 13
