= Claude N'Goran =

Ivorian tennis player

- Full name: Claude N'Goran
- Country (sports): Ivory Coast
- Born: 18 March 1975 (age 51) Adzopé, Cote d'Ivoire
- Plays: Left-handed
- Prize money: $44,203

Singles
- Career record: 9–14
- Career titles: 0
- Highest ranking: No. 200 (7 August 1995)

Doubles
- Career record: 4–13
- Career titles: 0
- Highest ranking: No. 161 (15 April 1996)

Claude N'Goran (born 18 March 1975) is a former professional tennis player from the Ivory Coast.

== Biography ==
Born in Adzopé, N'Goran grew up in a family of 13 in the city of Abidjan, the son of an auto factory worker and a homemaker. He learned to play tennis with self-made wooden paddles, as they couldn't afford proper rackets. One of his seven brothers is tennis player Clement N'Goran.

N'Goran, a big serving left-handed player, is the most capped Ivorian Davis Cup representative in history. In total he featured in 94 matches across 45 ties, from 1990 to 2008, for 53 overall wins, 37 in singles. He also represented the Ivory Coast at the 1996 Summer Olympics, in the men's doubles competition. Partnering his brother, Clement, the Ivorians won their first round match over Chinese Taipei, then exited in the round of 16 to the third seeded Dutch pairing, Jacco Eltingh and Paul Haarhuis. He was a member of Ivory Coast's gold medal-winning team at the 1999 All-Africa Games.

During his professional career he played mostly on the Challenger and Futures/Satellite circuits. He had a win over Carlos Moyá at the Tampere Open in 1995 and won a total of four Challenger titles, all in doubles. At ATP Tour level he appeared in the main draw of three tournaments, the first was the 1995 Lipton Championships (Miami Masters), which he entered as a qualifier and lost in the first round to MaliVai Washington. His next appearances were in the doubles events in Toulouse, where he was based. He participated in the tournament twice, with brother Clement in 1996 and Lionel Barthez in 2000.

== Challenger titles ==
=== Doubles: (4) ===
No.	Year	Tournament	Surface	Partner	Opponents	Score
1.	1995	Asunción, Paraguay	Clay	(United States) Francisco Montana	(Paraguay) Paulo Carvallo (Paraguay) Francisco Rodríguez	6–2, 6–3
2.	1995	Cali, Colombia	Clay	(United States) Francisco Montana	(Brazil) Otávio Della (Brazil) Gustavo Kuerten	6–3, 3–6, 6–4
3.	1996	Salinas, Ecuador	Hard	(Venezuela) Juan Carlos Bianchi	(Argentina) Daniel Orsanic (Italy) Laurence Tieleman	7–5, 6–4
4.	1996	Montauban, France	Clay	(France) Gilles Bastié	(South Africa) Clinton Ferreira (Romania) Andrei Pavel	6–4, 1–6, 7–6
