= Andrej Kračman =

Slovenian tennis player

- Country (sports): Slovenia
- Born: 22 August 1982 (age 42); Ljubljana, Slovenia
- Height: 1.96 m (6 ft 5 in)
- Plays: Right-handed
- Coach: Neco Nikolic
- Prize money: $24,209

Singles
- Career record: 9–6 (ATP Tour level, Grand Slam level, and Davis Cup)
- Career titles: 0
- Highest ranking: No. 393 (9 June 2003)

Doubles
- Career record: 8–4 (ATP Tour level, Grand Slam level, and Davis Cup)
- Career titles: 0
- Highest ranking: No. 272 (17 March 2003)

Andrej Kračman (born 22 August 1982) is a tennis player from Slovenia.

== Tennis career ==
=== Juniors ===
As a junior Kračman reached as high as No. 79 in the junior world singles rankings in 1998 (and No. 23 in doubles).

=== Pro tour ===
He has played multiple seasons of Davis Cup including the 2009 Slovenia Davis Cup team.
