= Hisham Hemeda =

Egyptian tennis player

Hisham Hemeda (هشام مصطفى حميدة; born 1 May 1978) is an Egyptian retired tennis player. He represented Egypt in Davis Cup between 1994 and 2001, accumulating a 13/6 win–loss record over 14 ties.

Hemeda played college tennis for the University of Georgia and captained them to the NCAA team title in 1999.

In his pro career, he reached a career-high Association of Tennis Professionals (ATP) ranking of 420 on July 16, 2001.
