= Owen Casey =

Irish tennis player (born 1969)

- Country (sports): Ireland
- Born: 22 October 1969 (age 55); Dublin, Ireland
- Plays: Right-handed
- University: Clemson University

Singles
- Career record: ?
- Highest ranking: No. 228

Doubles
- Career record: ?

Owen Casey (born 22 October 1969 in Dublin) is a former tennis player from Ireland.

Casey is a three-time tennis Olympian playing in Seoul '88, Barcelona '92 and Atlanta '96. The right-hander reached his highest singles ATP-ranking on 12 October 1992, when he became World Number 228.

Casey won 33 of his 49 Davis Cup matches for Ireland. He later ran a camp at Mountpleasant tennis club, Dublin.
