= 2012 Status Athens Open – Singles =

Singles
- 2012 Status Athens Open

Final
- Champion: (Australia) Marinko Matosevic
- Runner-up: (Belgium) Ruben Bemelmans
- Score: 6–3, 6–4

Events
Singles	Doubles
← 2011 ·	Status Athens Open	· 2013 →

Matthias Bachinger was the defending champion but chose to compete in 2012 Strabag Prague Open instead.
Marinko Matosevic won the final against Ruben Bemelmans 6–3, 6–4.

== Seeds ==
1. (Russia) Igor Kunitsyn (second round)
2. (Slovakia) Karol Beck (semifinals)
3. (Estonia) Jürgen Zopp (quarterfinals)
4. (Australia) Marinko Matosevic (champion)
5. (Belgium) Ruben Bemelmans (final)
6. (Russia) Alexander Kudryavtsev (second round, retired due to a right elbow injury)
7. (Russia) Konstantin Kravchuk (first round)
8. (Lithuania) Laurynas Grigelis (quarterfinals)

== Draw ==
=== Key ===
- Q = Qualifier
- WC = Wild card
- LL = Lucky loser
- Alt = Alternate
- SE = Special exempt
- PR = Protected ranking
- ITF = ITF entry
- JE = Junior exempt
- w/o = Walkover
- r = Retired
- d = Defaulted
- SR = Special ranking

=== Finals ===
Semifinals
(Canada) Peter Polansky	3	2
4	(Australia) Marinko Matosevic	6	6
5	(Belgium) Ruben Bemelmans	4	6	6
2	(Slovakia) Karol Beck	6	4	4

Final
4	(Australia) Marinko Matosevic	6	6
5	(Belgium) Ruben Bemelmans	3	4

=== Top half ===
First round
1	(Russia) I Kunitsyn	4	7^{7}	6
(Australia) Matt Reid	6	6^{5}	3
(United Kingdom) J Baker	6	6
(Germany) M Zverev	3	2
(Spain) G Granollers	7^{7}	6^{4}	6^{3}
(Canada) P Polansky	6^{5}	7^{7}	7^{7}
Q	(Italy) R Ghedin	4	7	6^{2}
6	(Russia) A Kudryavtsev	6	5	7^{7}
4	(Australia) M Matosevic	6	5	6
(France) F Martin	3	7	4
(United Kingdom) J Goodall	6^{1}	4
(Switzerland) M Lammer	7^{7}	6
(Austria) P Oswald	4	6	4
(Moldova) R Borvanov	6	4	6
(Germany) A Begemann	6	7
7	(Russia) K Kravchuk	4	5

Second round
1	(Russia) I Kunitsyn	6^{3}	3
(United Kingdom) J Baker	7^{7}	6
(Canada) P Polansky	3
6	(Russia) A Kudryavtsev	0^{r}
4	(Australia) M Matosevic	6	6
(Switzerland) M Lammer	4	1
(Moldova) R Borvanov	6	7^{7}
(Germany) A Begemann	3	6^{3}

Quarterfinals
(United Kingdom) J Baker	2	4
(Canada) P Polansky	6	6
4	(Australia) M Matosevic	4	6	6
(Moldova) R Borvanov	6	1	1

Semifinals
(Canada) P Polansky	3	2
4	(Australia) M Matosevic	6	6

=== Bottom half ===
First round
5	(Belgium) R Bemelmans	7^{7}	6
WC	(Greece) K Economidis	6^{3}	3
Q	(Serbia) I Bozoljac	5	3
(Ukraine) D Molchanov	7	6
(France) G Burquier	3	6	6
WC	(Greece) A Jakupovic	6	3	2
WC	(Greece) Theodoros Angelinos	5	6^{1}
3	(Estonia) J Zopp	7	7^{7}
8	(Lithuania) L Grigelis	7^{7}	6
(Netherlands) M Middelkoop	6^{0}	1
(Ukraine) I Marchenko	5	4
Q	(Belarus) A Bury	7	6
Q	(Austria) Nikolaus Moser	6	6
(Russia) E Kirillov	4	3
WC	(Greece) M Kalovelonis	3	6^{6}
2	(Slovakia) K Beck	6	7^{8}

Second round
5	(Belgium) R Bemelmans	7	6
(Ukraine) D Molchanov	5	3
(France) G Burquier	2	4
3	(Estonia) J Zopp	6	6
8	(Lithuania) L Grigelis	6	6
Q	(Belarus) A Bury	4	4
Q	(Austria) Nikolaus Moser	1	2
2	(Slovakia) K Beck	6	6

Quarterfinals
5	(Belgium) R Bemelmans	6	6
3	(Estonia) J Zopp	3	4
8	(Lithuania) L Grigelis	6	3	6^{4}
2	(Slovakia) K Beck	4	6	7^{7}

Semifinals
5	(Belgium) R Bemelmans	4	6	6
2	(Slovakia) K Beck	6	4	4
