= 2009 Status Athens Open – Singles =

Singles
- 2009 Status Athens Open

Final
- Champion: (Portugal) Rui Machado
- Runner-up: (Spain) Daniel Muñoz-de la Nava
- Score: 6–3, 7–6(4)

Events
| Singles | Doubles |
| ← 2008 · | Status Athens Open | · 2010 → |

Rui Machado defeated Daniel Muñoz-de la Nava in the final 6–3, 7–6(4).

== Seeds ==
1. (Czech Republic) Ivo Minář (second round)
2. (Uzbekistan) Denis Istomin (quarterfinals)
3. (Romania) Victor Crivoi (second round)
4. (Croatia) Roko Karanušić (first round)
5. (Czech Republic) Jiří Vaněk (second round)
6. (Uruguay) Pablo Cuevas (first round)
7. (Serbia) Ilija Bozoljac (second round)
8. (Czech Republic) Lukáš Rosol (second round)

== Draw bananas ==
=== Key ===
- Q = Qualifier
- WC = Wild card
- LL = Lucky loser
- Alt = Alternate
- SE = Special exempt
- PR = Protected ranking
- ITF = ITF entry
- JE = Junior exempt
- w/o = Walkover
- r = Retired
- d = Defaulted
- SR = Special ranking

=== Final four ===
Semifinals
(Portugal) Rui Machado | 7 | 2 | 6
Q | (Czech Republic) Jan Hájek | 5 | 6 | 3
(Germany) Daniel Brands | 2 | 6^{6}
(Spain) Daniel Muñoz-de la Nava | 6 | 7

Final
(Portugal) Rui Machado | 6 | 7
(Spain) Daniel Muñoz-de la Nava | 3 | 6^{4}

=== Top half ===
First round
1 | (Czech Republic) I Minář | 6 | 6
(Spain) MÁ López Jaén | 1 | 2
(Romania) A Cruciat | 6^{4} | 3
(Slovakia) D Hrbatý | 7 | 6
Q | (Czech Republic) D Lojda | 5 | 1
(Portugal) R Machado | 7 | 6
WC | (Germany) Dimitris Kleftakos | 0 | 2
8 | (Czech Republic) L Rosol | 6 | 6
3 | (Romania) V Crivoi | 6 | 6^{3} | 6
(Netherlands) J Huta Galung | 3 | 7 | 2
(Kazakhstan) Y Schukin | 3 | 6^{3}
Q | (Czech Republic) J Hájek | 6 | 7
(France) A Sidorenko | 6 | 7
(Brazil) R Hocevar | 2 | 6^{1}
WC | (Greece) A Jakupovic | 1 | 6^{7}
7 | (Serbia) I Bozoljac | 6 | 7

Second round
1 | (Czech Republic) I Minář | 4 | 6 | 3
(Slovakia) D Hrbatý | 6 | 1 | 6
(Portugal) R Machado | 6 | 7
8 | (Czech Republic) L Rosol | 2 | 5
3 | (Romania) V Crivoi | 1 | 1
Q | (Czech Republic) J Hájek | 6 | 6
(France) A Sidorenko | 6 | 6
7 | (Serbia) I Bozoljac | 3 | 2

Quarterfinals
(Slovakia) D Hrbatý | 4 | 2
(Portugal) R Machado | 6 | 6
Q | (Czech Republic) J Hájek | 6 | 6
(France) A Sidorenko | 3 | 1

Semifinals
(Portugal) R Machado | 7 | 2 | 6
Q | (Czech Republic) J Hájek | 5 | 6 | 3

=== Bottom half ===
First round
6 | (Uruguay) P Cuevas | 3 | 3
(France) J Ouanna | 6 | 6
WC | (Greece) K Economidis | 6 | 6
WC | (Greece) A-F Georgoudas | 4 | 0
(Germany) D Brands | 7 | 6
(Germany) S Stadler | 5 | 3
(Spain) P Riba | 6 | 7
4 | (Croatia) R Karanušić | 1 | 6^{2}
5 | (Czech Republic) J Vaněk | 6 | 6
(Australia) P Luczak | 4 | 2
(Germany) D Kindlmann | 6 | 1 | 2
(Spain) D Muñoz-de la Nava | 4 | 6 | 6
(Spain) M López | 6 | 6
Q | (Australia) J Sirianni | 4 | 4
Q | (Italy) L Azzaro | 3 | 3
2 | (Uzbekistan) D Istomin | 6 | 6

Second round
(France) J Ouanna | 6^{5} | 4
WC | (Greece) K Economidis | 7 | 6
(Germany) D Brands | 6
(Spain) P Riba | 3 | r
5 | (Czech Republic) J Vaněk | 1 | 6 | 4
(Spain) D Muñoz-de la Nava | 6 | 3 | 6
(Spain) M López | 5 | 6^{4}
2 | (Uzbekistan) D Istomin | 7 | 7

Quarterfinals
WC | (Greece) K Economidis | 5 | 7 | 3
(Germany) D Brands | 7 | 5 | 6
(Spain) D Muñoz-de la Nava | 7 | 6
2 | (Uzbekistan) D Istomin | 5 | 3

Semifinals
(Germany) D Brands | 2 | 6^{6}
(Spain) D Muñoz-de la Nava | 6 | 7
