= 2011 Status Athens Open =

- Date: 11–17 April
- Edition: 4th
- Location: Athens, Greece

Champions

Singles
- (Germany) Matthias Bachinger

Doubles
- (United Kingdom) Colin Fleming / (United States) Scott Lipsky
← 2010 ·	Status Athens Open	· 2012 →

The 2011 Status Athens Open was a professional tennis tournament played on hard courts. It was the fourth edition of the tournament which is part of the 2011 ATP Challenger Tour. It took place in Athens, Greece between 11 and 17 April 2011.

== ATP entrants ==
=== Seeds ===
Country	Player	Rank^{1}	Seed
GER	Benjamin Becker	65	1
RUS	Dmitry Tursunov	82	2
ISR	Dudi Sela	105	3
GER	Matthias Bachinger	133	4
SVK	Karol Beck	134	5
RUS	Alexander Kudryavtsev	140	6
SUI	Stéphane Bohli	143	7
IRL	Conor Niland	144	8

- Rankings are as of April 4, 2011.

=== Other entrants ===
The following players received wildcards into the singles main draw:

- (Greece) Konstantinos Economidis
- (Greece) Manolis Glezos
- (Greece) Alex Jakupovic
- (Greece) Charalampos Kapogiannis

The following players received entry from the qualifying draw:

- (Romania) Teodor-Dacian Craciun
- (Philippines) Treat Conrad Huey
- (Croatia) Roko Karanušić
- (Russia) Andrey Kumantsov

== Champions ==
=== Singles ===
(Germany) Matthias Bachinger def. (Russia) Dmitry Tursunov, walkover

=== Doubles ===
(United Kingdom) Colin Fleming / (United States) Scott Lipsky def. (Germany) Matthias Bachinger / (Germany) Benjamin Becker, walkover
