= 2009 Status Athens Open – Doubles =

Doubles
- 2009 Status Athens Open

Final
- Champions: (Australia) Rameez Junaid (Germany) Philipp Marx
- Runners-up: (Netherlands) Jesse Huta Galung (Portugal) Rui Machado
- Score: 6–4, 6–3

Events
Singles	Doubles
← 2008 ·	Status Athens Open	· 2010 →

Marc López and Gabriel Trujillo-Soler were the defending champions. Trujillo-Soler chose to not participate this year and López partnered up with Leonardo Azzaro. They lost to Rameez Junaid and Philipp Marx in the second round.
Junaid and Marx won in the final 6–4, 6–3, against Jesse Huta Galung and Rui Machado.

== Seeds ==
1. (Australia) Rameez Junaid / (Germany) Philipp Marx (champions)
2. (Austria) Philipp Oswald / (Switzerland) Jean-Claude Scherrer (quarterfinals)
3. (United Kingdom) Jamie Delgado / (United Kingdom) Jamie Murray (quarterfinals)
4. (Italy) Alessandro Motti / (Spain) Daniel Muñoz-de la Nava (quarterfinals)

== Draw ==
Key

- Q = Qualifier
- WC = Wild card
- LL = Lucky loser
- Alt = Alternate
- ITF = ITF entry
- PR = Protected ranking
- SR = Special ranking
- SE = Special exempt
- JE = Junior exempt
- JR = Junior Accelerator Programme entrant
- CO = College Accelerator Programme entrant
- NG = Next Gen Accelerator Program entrant
- w/o = Walkover
- r = Retired
- d = Defaulted

=== Draw ===
First round
1	(Australia) R Junaid (Germany) P Marx	7	6
WC	(Greece) Alexandros Georgoudas (Greece) Dimitrios Loucareas	5	2
(Brazil) R Hocevar (Germany) S Stadler	4	3
(Argentina) L Azzaro (Spain) M López	6	6
3	(United Kingdom) J Delgado (United Kingdom) J Murray	6	3	[11]
(Slovakia) D Hrbatý (Czech Republic) L Rosol	4	6	[9]
(Netherlands) M Middelkoop (Australia) J Sirianni	3	6^{1}
(Uzbekistan) D Istomin (France) A Sidorenko	6	7
(Czech Republic) I Minář (Czech Republic) J Vaněk	6^{3}	0
(Netherlands) J Huta Galung (Portugal) R Machado	7	6
(Serbia) I Bozoljac (Croatia) R Karanušić	3	2
4	(Italy) A Motti (Spain) D Muñoz-de la Nava	6	6
WC	(Greece) K Economidis (Greece) A Jakupovic	6	6
(Germany) D Brands (Germany) M Kohlmann	4	3
WC	(Uruguay) P Cuevas (Germany) Dimitris Kleftakos	4	7	[4]
2	(Austria) P Oswald (Switzerland) J-C Scherrer	6	6^{5}	[10]

Quarterfinals
1	(Australia) R Junaid (Germany) P Marx	6	7
(Argentina) L Azzaro (Spain) M López	4	5
3	(United Kingdom) J Delgado (United Kingdom) J Murray	6^{6}	4
(Uzbekistan) D Istomin (France) A Sidorenko	7	6
(Netherlands) J Huta Galung (Portugal) R Machado	7	6
4	(Italy) A Motti (Spain) D Muñoz-de la Nava	5	1
WC	(Greece) K Economidis (Greece) A Jakupovic	7	6^{4}	[10]
2	(Austria) P Oswald (Switzerland) J-C Scherrer	6^{6}	7	[6]

Semifinals
1	(Australia) R Junaid (Germany) P Marx	3	6	[10]
(Uzbekistan) D Istomin (France) A Sidorenko	6	3	[6]
(Netherlands) J Huta Galung (Portugal) R Machado	6	5	[12]
WC	(Greece) K Economidis (Greece) A Jakupovic	4	7	[10]

Finals
1	(Australia) R Junaid (Germany) P Marx	6	6
(Netherlands) J Huta Galung (Portugal) R Machado	4	3
