= 2011 Status Athens Open – Doubles =

Doubles
- 2011 Status Athens Open

Final
- Champions: (United Kingdom) Colin Fleming (United States) Scott Lipsky
- Runners-up: (Germany) Matthias Bachinger (Germany) Benjamin Becker
- Score: walkover

Events
Singles	Doubles
← 2010 ·	Status Athens Open	· 2012 →

Rik de Voest and Lu Yen-hsun were the defending champions but decided not to participate.
Colin Fleming and Scott Lipsky won the final because their opponents Matthias Bachinger and Benjamin Becker withdrew.

== Seeds ==
1. (Mexico) Santiago González / (United States) Travis Rettenmaier (first round)
2. (United Kingdom) Colin Fleming / (United States) Scott Lipsky (champions)
3. (Australia) Rameez Junaid / (Germany) Philipp Marx (first round)
4. (United States) Brian Battistone / (Philippines) Treat Conrad Huey (first round)

== Draw ==
=== Key ===
- Q = Qualifier
- WC = Wild card
- LL = Lucky loser
- Alt = Alternate
- SE = Special exempt
- PR = Protected ranking
- ITF = ITF entry
- JE = Junior exempt
- w/o = Walkover
- r = Retired
- d = Defaulted
- SR = Special ranking

=== Draw ===
First round
1	(Mexico) S González (United States) T Rettenmaier	6	5	[7]
(Germany) M Bachinger (Germany) B Becker	4	7	[10]
WC	(Switzerland) M Chiudinelli (Greece) C Kapogiannis	1	4
(Switzerland) Y Allegro (Switzerland) S Bohli	6	6
3	(Australia) R Junaid (Germany) P Marx	5	4
(Israel) D Sela (Netherlands) I Sijsling	7	6
(Australia) J Kerr (United States) D Martin	6	6
(United Kingdom) J Delgado (United Kingdom) J Marray	3	4
(Russia) M Elgin (Russia) A Kudryavtsev	6	6
WC	(Greece) Pier Bismpikos (Greece) Manolis Glezos	1	2
(Slovakia) K Beck (Poland) J Janowicz	7	6
4	(United States) B Battistone (Philippines) TC Huey	5	3
(Germany) F Moser (Czech Republic) D Škoch	7	6
WC	(Greece) K Economidis (Greece) A Jakupovic	6^{5}	3
(United States) T Parrott (Slovakia) F Polášek	4	6^{4}
2	(United Kingdom) C Fleming (United States) S Lipsky	6	7

Quarterfinals
(Germany) M Bachinger (Germany) B Becker	6	6
(Switzerland) Y Allegro (Switzerland) S Bohli	2	1
(Israel) D Sela (Netherlands) I Sijsling	6	4	[7]
(Australia) J Kerr (United States) D Martin	4	6	[10]
(Russia) M Elgin (Russia) A Kudryavtsev	6	6
(Slovakia) K Beck (Poland) J Janowicz	2	3
(Germany) F Moser (Czech Republic) D Škoch	4	2
2	(United Kingdom) C Fleming (United States) S Lipsky	6	6

Semifinals
(Germany) M Bachinger (Germany) B Becker	6	6^{6}	[10]
(Australia) J Kerr (United States) D Martin	4	7	[6]
(Russia) M Elgin (Russia) A Kudryavtsev	6	0^{r}
2	(United Kingdom) C Fleming (United States) S Lipsky	4	1

Final
(Germany) M Bachinger (Germany) B Becker
2	(United Kingdom) C Fleming (United States) S Lipsky	w/o
