= 2011 Status Athens Open – Singles =

Singles
- 2011 Status Athens Open

Final
- Champion: (Germany) Matthias Bachinger
- Runner-up: (Russia) Dmitry Tursunov
- Score: walkover

Events
| Singles | Doubles |
| ← 2010 · | Status Athens Open | · 2012 → |

Lu Yen-hsun was the defending champion but decided not to participate.
Dmitry Tursunov and Matthias Bachinger reached the final in which Bachinger claimed the title, because Tursunov withdrew due to a knee problem.

== Seeds ==
1. (Germany) Benjamin Becker (quarterfinals)
2. (Russia) Dmitry Tursunov (final, withdrew due to a knee problem)
3. (Israel) Dudi Sela (semifinals)
4. (Germany) Matthias Bachinger (champion)
5. (Slovakia) Karol Beck (second round)
6. (Russia) Alexandre Kudryavtsev (quarterfinals)
7. (Switzerland) Stéphane Bohli (semifinals)
8. (Republic of Ireland) Conor Niland (second round)

== Draw ==
=== Key ===
- Q = Qualifier
- WC = Wild card
- LL = Lucky loser
- Alt = Alternate
- ITF = ITF entry
- PR = Protected ranking
- SR = Special ranking
- SE = Special exempt
- JE = Junior exempt
- JR = Junior Accelerator Programme entrant
- CO = College Accelerator Programme entrant
- NG = Next Gen Accelerator Program entrant
- w/o = Walkover
- r = Retired
- d = Defaulted

=== Finals ===
Semifinals
7 | (Switzerland) Stéphane Bohli | 4 | 6^{3}
4 | (Germany) Matthias Bachinger | 6 | 7
3 | (Israel) Dudi Sela | 4 | 1
2 | (Russia) Dmitry Tursunov | 6 | 6

Final
4 | (Germany) Matthias Bachinger | w/o
2 | (Russia) Dmitry Tursunov

=== Top half ===
First round
1 | (Germany) B Becker | 7 | 6
WC | (Greece) C Kapogiannis | 6^{1} | 1
(Germany) D Meffert | 6^{4} | 4
(France) S Robert | 7 | 6
(Slovakia) M Semjan | 3 | 2
(Netherlands) I Sijsling | 6 | 6
WC | (Greece) K Economidis | 6^{4} | 5
7 | (Switzerland) S Bohli | 7 | 7
4 | (Germany) M Bachinger | 6 | 6
Q | (Romania) T-D Crăciun | 3 | 1
(Spain) R Bautista Agut | 7 | 6
Q | (Russia) A Kumantsov | 6^{5} | 2
(Switzerland) M Chiudinelli | 6 | 6^{11} | 4
(Spain) G Alcaide | 1 | 7 | 6
Q | (Philippines) TC Huey | 2 | 4
8 | (Republic of Ireland) C Niland | 6 | 6

Second round
1 | (Germany) B Becker | 6 | 4 | 6
(France) S Robert | 3 | 6 | 1
(Netherlands) I Sijsling | 7 | 4 | 2
7 | (Switzerland) S Bohli | 6^{4} | 6 | 6
4 | (Germany) M Bachinger | 6 | 6
(Spain) R Bautista Agut | 0 | 2
(Spain) G Alcaide | 6 | 6^{5} | 6
8 | (Republic of Ireland) C Niland | 1 | 7 | 4

Quarterfinals
1 | (Germany) B Becker | 3 | 1
7 | (Switzerland) S Bohli | 6 | 6
4 | (Germany) M Bachinger | 6 | 6
(Spain) G Alcaide | 3 | 4

Semifinals
7 | (Switzerland) S Bohli | 4 | 6^{3}
4 | (Germany) M Bachinger | 6 | 7

=== Bottom half ===
First round
6 | (Russia) A Kudryavtsev | 7 | 6
(Mexico) S González | 5 | 3
Q | (Croatia) R Karanušić | 6 | 6
WC | (Greece) Manolis Glezos | 1 | 4
(Romania) M Copil | 7 | 6^{3} | 7
WC | (Greece) A Jakupovic | 6^{3} | 7 | 5
(Poland) J Janowicz | 4 | 3
3 | (Israel) D Sela | 6 | 6
5 | (Slovakia) K Beck | 6 | 6^{3} | 6
(Estonia) J Zopp | 3 | 7 | 4
(Serbia) I Bozoljac | 2 | 6^{5}
(Kazakhstan) E Korolev | 6 | 7
(Netherlands) M Middelkoop | 0 | 4
(Czech Republic) D Lojda | 6 | 6
(Russia) K Kravchuk | 3 | 4
2 | (Russia) D Tursunov | 6 | 6

Second round
6 | (Russia) A Kudryavtsev | 6 | 6
Q | (Croatia) R Karanušić | 1 | 4
(Romania) M Copil | 4 | 2
3 | (Israel) D Sela | 6 | 6
5 | (Slovakia) K Beck | 4 | 4
(Kazakhstan) E Korolev | 6 | 6
(Czech Republic) D Lojda | 6^{3} | 6^{7}
2 | (Russia) D Tursunov | 7 | 7

Quarterfinals
6 | (Russia) A Kudryavtsev | 6^{7} | 4
3 | (Israel) D Sela | 7 | 6
(Kazakhstan) E Korolev | 5 | 5
2 | (Russia) D Tursunov | 7 | 7

Semifinals
3 | (Israel) D Sela | 4 | 1
2 | (Russia) D Tursunov | 6 | 6
