= 2010 Status Athens Open – Singles =

Singles
- 2010 Status Athens Open

Final
- Champion: (Chinese Taipei) Lu Yen-hsun
- Runner-up: (Germany) Rainer Schüttler
- Score: 3–6, 7–6^{(7–4)}, 6–4

Events
Singles	Doubles
← 2009 ·	Status Athens Open	· 2011 →

Rui Machado was the defending champion, but chose to compete in Rome instead.
Lu Yen-hsun won in the final 3–6, 7–6^{(7–4)}, 6–4, against Rainer Schüttler.

== Seeds ==
1. (Germany) Benjamin Becker (first round)
2. (Germany) Philipp Petzschner (second round, retired)
3. (Switzerland) Marco Chiudinelli (quarterfinals)
4. (Slovakia) Lukáš Lacko (second round)
5. (Israel) Dudi Sela (semifinals)
6. (Belgium) Xavier Malisse (first round)
7. (Germany) Rainer Schüttler (final)
8. (Chinese Taipei) Lu Yen-hsun (champion)

== Draw ==
=== Key ===
- Q = Qualifier
- WC = Wild card
- LL = Lucky loser
- Alt = Alternate
- SE = Special exempt
- PR = Protected ranking
- ITF = ITF entry
- JE = Junior exempt
- w/o = Walkover
- r = Retired
- d = Defaulted
- SR = Special ranking

=== Finals ===
Semifinals
8	(Chinese Taipei) Lu Yen-hsun	6	6
(Luxembourg) Gilles Müller	4	4
7	(Germany) Rainer Schüttler	6	6
5	(Israel) Dudi Sela	4	2

Final
8	(Chinese Taipei) Lu Yen-hsun	3	7	6
7	(Germany) Rainer Schüttler	6	6^{3}	4

=== Top half ===
First round
1/WC	(Germany) B Becker	3	6^{1}
Q	(Slovakia) M Mečíř Jr.	6	7
(Japan) Y Sugita	6	6
(Belgium) N Desein	4	4
(Israel) H Levy	6	6
(Netherlands) I Sijsling	4	4
WC	(Greece) A Jakupovic	2	1
8	(Chinese Taipei) Y-h Lu	6	6
4	(Slovakia) L Lacko	3	7	6
LL	(South Africa) R de Voest	6	6^{1}	4
(Slovakia) D Hrbatý	4	2
(Serbia) I Bozoljac	6	6
(Netherlands) R Haase	1	7	4
Q	(Israel) N Okun	6	5	6
(Luxembourg) G Müller	7	6^{5}	7
6	(Belgium) X Malisse	6^{3}	7	5

Second round
Q	(Slovakia) M Mečíř Jr.	3	4
(Japan) Y Sugita	6	6
(Israel) H Levy	3	2
8	(Chinese Taipei) Y-h Lu	6	6
4	(Slovakia) L Lacko	6^{3}	4
(Serbia) I Bozoljac	7	6
Q	(Israel) N Okun	2	2
(Luxembourg) G Müller	6	6

Quarterfinals
(Japan) Y Sugita	4	1
8	(Chinese Taipei) Y-h Lu	6	6
(Serbia) I Bozoljac	6^{7}	2
(Luxembourg) G Müller	7	6

Semifinals
8	(Chinese Taipei) Y-h Lu	6	6
(Luxembourg) G Müller	4	4

=== Bottom half ===
First round
7	(Germany) R Schüttler	7	4	6
Q	(Lithuania) R Berankis	5	6	4
WC	(Greece) K Economidis	6^{3}	7	7
(France) N Mahut	7	5	6^{3}
(Switzerland) S Bohli	6	6
WC	(Greece) T Angelinos	2	2
(United States) J Witten	7	5	2
3	(Switzerland) M Chiudinelli	6^{5}	7	6
5	(Israel) D Sela	6	6
LL	(Germany) S Stadler	4	2
Q	(Latvia) A Juška	6^{2}	6	4
(Slovenia) G Žemlja	7	4	6
(Germany) D Kindlmann	1	1	r
(Germany) B Phau	6	2
(United Kingdom) A Bogdanovic	4	4
2	(Germany) P Petzschner	6	6

Second round
7	(Germany) R Schüttler	6	6
WC	(Greece) K Economidis	4	2
(Switzerland) S Bohli	7	5	6^{5}
3	(Switzerland) M Chiudinelli	6^{3}	7	7
5	(Israel) D Sela	6	6
(Slovenia) G Žemlja	2	3
(Germany) B Phau	5
2	(Germany) P Petzschner	2	r

Quarterfinals
7	(Germany) R Schüttler	6^{5}	7	6
3	(Switzerland) M Chiudinelli	7	5	3
5	(Israel) D Sela	6	6
(Germany) B Phau	4	3

Semifinals
7	(Germany) R Schüttler	6	6
5	(Israel) D Sela	4	2
