= 2012 Status Athens Open – Doubles =

Doubles
- 2012 Status Athens Open

Final
- Champions: (Germany) Andre Begemann (Australia) Jordan Kerr
- Runners-up: (Spain) Gerard Granollers (Greece) Alexandros Jakupovic
- Score: 6–2, 6–3

Events
Singles	Doubles
← 2011 ·	Status Athens Open	· 2013 →

Colin Fleming and Scott Lipsky were the defending champions but decided not to participate.
Andre Begemann and Jordan Kerr won the title 6–2, 6–3 Gerard Granollers and Alexandros Jakupovic against.

== Seeds ==
1. (Russia) Mikhail Elgin / (Russia) Alexander Kudryavtsev (quarterfinals)
2. (Germany) Andre Begemann / (Australia) Jordan Kerr (champions)
3. (Austria) Philipp Oswald / (Germany) Simon Stadler (semifinals, retired)
4. (Belarus) Alexander Bury / (Ukraine) Denys Molchanov (first round)

== Draw ==
=== Key ===
- Q = Qualifier
- WC = Wild card
- LL = Lucky loser
- Alt = Alternate
- SE = Special exempt
- PR = Protected ranking
- ITF = ITF entry
- JE = Junior exempt
- w/o = Walkover
- r = Retired
- d = Defaulted
- SR = Special ranking

=== Draw ===
First round
1	(Russia) M Elgin (Russia) A Kudryavtsev	6	4	[14]
(Austria) Nikolaus Mauser (Australia) Matt Reid	2	6	[12]
WC	(Spain) G Granollers (Greece) A Jakupovic	7^{8}	6
WC	(Greece) T Angelinos (Greece) M Kalovelonis	6^{6}	1
3	(Austria) P Oswald (Germany) S Stadler	7	6
(Russia) E Kirillov (Belarus) A Vasilevski	5	3
(Russia) K Kravchuk (Switzerland) M Lammer	3	7	[10]
(Slovakia) K Beck (Belgium) R Bemelmans	6	5	[6]
(Republic of Ireland) James Cluskey (France) F Martin	6	6
(United Kingdom) C Eaton (Australia) J Peers	4	1
(Moldova) R Borvanov (Russia) D Matsukevitch	2	7^{7}	[11]
4	(Belarus) A Bury (Ukraine) D Molchanov	6	6^{2}	[9]
(Lithuania) L Grigelis (Australia) R Junaid	6	6
(Canada) P Polansky (Germany) M Zverev	4	3
WC	(Greece) K Economidis (Greece) C Kapogiannis	4	5
2	(Germany) A Begemann (Australia) J Kerr	6	7

Quarterfinals
1	(Russia) M Elgin (Russia) A Kudryavtsev	2	2
WC	(Spain) G Granollers (Greece) A Jakupovic	6	6
3	(Austria) P Oswald (Germany) S Stadler	6	6
(Russia) K Kravchuk (Switzerland) M Lammer	2	1
(Republic of Ireland) James Cluskey (France) F Martin	6	6
(Moldova) R Borvanov (Russia) D Matsukevitch	4	4
(Lithuania) L Grigelis (Australia) R Junaid	3	6	[8]
2	(Germany) A Begemann (Australia) J Kerr	6	4	[10]

Semifinals
WC	(Spain) G Granollers (Greece) A Jakupovic	4	2
3	(Austria) P Oswald (Germany) S Stadler	6	3	r
(Republic of Ireland) James Cluskey (France) F Martin	4	4
2	(Germany) A Begemann (Australia) J Kerr	6	6

Final
WC	(Spain) G Granollers (Greece) A Jakupovic	2	3
2	(Germany) A Begemann (Australia) J Kerr	6	6
