= 2010 Status Athens Open – Doubles =

Doubles
- 2010 Status Athens Open

Final
- Champions: (South Africa) Rik de Voest (Chinese Taipei) Lu Yen-hsun
- Runners-up: (Netherlands) Robin Haase (Netherlands) Igor Sijsling
- Score: 6–3, 6–4

Events
Singles	Doubles
← 2009 ·	Status Athens Open	· 2011 →

Rameez Junaid and Philipp Marx were the defending champions; however, they chose not to participate this year.
Rik de Voest and Lu Yen-hsun defeated 6–3, 6–4 Robin Haase and Igor Sijsling in the final.

== Seeds ==
1. (Czech Republic) Leoš Friedl / (Czech Republic) David Škoch (quarterfinals)
2. (Germany) Benjamin Becker / (Germany) Philipp Petzschner (first round, withdrew)
3. (United Kingdom) Jonathan Marray / (United Kingdom) Jamie Murray (first round)
4. (Thailand) Sanchai Ratiwatana / (Thailand) Sonchat Ratiwatana (quarterfinals)

== Draw ==
=== Key ===
- Q = Qualifier
- WC = Wild card
- LL = Lucky loser
- Alt = Alternate
- SE = Special exempt
- PR = Protected ranking
- ITF = ITF entry
- JE = Junior exempt
- w/o = Walkover
- r = Retired
- d = Defaulted
- SR = Special ranking

=== Draw ===
First round
1	(Czech Republic) L Friedl (Czech Republic) D Škoch	7	7
(Greece) T Angelinos (Spain) D Muñoz-De La Nava	6^{8}	6^{6}
(Belgium) R Bemelmans (Belgium) X Malisse	3	6^{3}
(South Africa) R de Voest (Chinese Taipei) Y-h Lu	6	7
4	(Thailand) Sa Ratiwatana (Thailand) So Ratiwatana	w/o
(United Kingdom) J Delgado (Luxembourg) G Müller
(Israel) J Erlich (Israel) H Levy	6	7
WC	(Greece) C Kapogiannis (Greece) D Loucareas	3	6^{3}
(Slovakia) D Hrbatý (Slovakia) L Lacko	4	0
(Switzerland) S Bohli (Serbia) I Bozoljac	6	6
(France) N Mahut (Croatia) L Zovko	6	1	[10]
3	(United Kingdom) J Marray (United Kingdom) J Murray	4	6	[7]
(Switzerland) M Chiudinelli (Germany) R Schüttler	6	6^{5}	[6]
(Netherlands) R Haase (Netherlands) I Sijsling	3	7	[10]
WC	(Greece) K Economidis (Greece) A Jakupovic	w/o
2	(Germany) B Becker (Germany) P Petzschner

Quarterfinals
1	(Czech Republic) L Friedl (Czech Republic) D Škoch	1	0
(South Africa) R de Voest (Chinese Taipei) Y-h Lu	6	6
4	(Thailand) Sa Ratiwatana (Thailand) So Ratiwatana	6^{1}	2
(Israel) J Erlich (Israel) H Levy	7	6
(Switzerland) S Bohli (Serbia) I Bozoljac	6	3	[13]
(France) N Mahut (Croatia) L Zovko	4	6	[11]
(Netherlands) R Haase (Netherlands) I Sijsling	5	6	[10]
WC	(Greece) K Economidis (Greece) A Jakupovic	7	4	[5]

Semifinals
(South Africa) R de Voest (Chinese Taipei) Y-h Lu	4	6	[10]
(Israel) J Erlich (Israel) H Levy	6	3	[8]
(Switzerland) S Bohli (Serbia) I Bozoljac	4	1
(Netherlands) R Haase (Netherlands) I Sijsling	6	6

Finals
(South Africa) R de Voest (Chinese Taipei) Y-h Lu	6	6
(Netherlands) R Haase (Netherlands) I Sijsling	3	4
