= 1998 Davis Cup Europe/Africa Zone Group III – Zone A =

International tennis competition

The Europe/Africa Zone was one of the three zones of the regional Davis Cup competition in 1998.

In the Europe/Africa Zone there were four different tiers, called groups, in which teams competed against each other to advance to the upper tier. The top two teams in Group III advanced to the Europe/Africa Zone Group II in 1999, whereas the bottom two teams were relegated to the Europe/Africa Zone Group IV in 1999.

== Participating nations ==
- Bosnia and Herzegovina
- Cyprus
- Estonia
- Ghana
- Greece
- Kenya
- Madagascar
- Togo

=== Draw ===
- Venue: Amicale Tennis Association, Lomé, Togo
- Date: 21–25 January

Group A

	EST	GHA	CYP	MAD	RR; W–L	Match; W–L	Set; W–L	Standings
Estonia		2–1	3–0	3–0	3–0	8–1 (89%)	12–9 (57%)	1
Ghana	1–2		3–0	2–1	2–1	6–3 (67%)	13–7 (65%)	2
Cyprus	0–3	0–3		3–0	1–2	3–6 (33%)	8–14 (36%)	3
Madagascar	0–3	1–2	0–3		0–3	1–8 (11%)	10–13 (43%)	4

Group B

	TOG	GRE	BIH	KEN	RR; W–L	Match; W–L	Set; W–L	Standings
Togo		3–0	2–1	2–1	3–0	7–2 (78%)	12–8 (60%)	1
Greece	0–3		3–0	1–2	1–2	4–5 (44%)	12–10 (55%)	2
Bosnia and Herzegovina	1–2	0–3		3–0	1–2	4–5 (44%)	8–10 (44%)	3
Kenya	1–2	2–1	0–3		1–2	3–6 (33%)	7–11 (39%)	4

1st to 4th place play-offs

3rd-4th play-off
A1	Estonia	2
A2	Ghana	1

Semifinals
A1	Estonia	0
B2	Greece	3
A2	Ghana	0
B1	Togo	2

Final
B2	Greece	2
B1	Togo	1

5th to 8th place play-offs

7th-8th play-off
A3	Cyprus	0
A4	Madagascar	3

5th-8th play-offs
A3	Cyprus	0
B4	Kenya	3
A4	Madagascar	1
B3	Bosnia and Herzegovina	2

5th-6th play-off
B4	Kenya	0
B3	Bosnia and Herzegovina	3

=== Final standings ===
Rank	Team
1	Greece
2	Togo
3	Estonia
4	Ghana
5	Bosnia and Herzegovina
6	Kenya
7	Madagascar
8	Cyprus

- Greece and Togo promoted to Group II in 1999.
- Madagascar and Cyprus relegated to Group IV in 1999.

== Round robin ==
=== Group A ===
==== Cyprus vs. Estonia ====
Cyprus
1
Amicale Tennis Association, Lomé, Togo
21 January 1998

Estonia
2

			1	2	3
1	(Cyprus) (Estonia)	Marinos Baghdatis; Rene Busch	5; 7	6; 2	3; 6
2	(Cyprus) (Estonia)	Demetrios Leontis; Alti Vahkal	7^{7} 6^{4}	6; 3
3	(Cyprus) (Estonia)	Demetrios Leontis / Neoclis Neocleous; Andrei Luzgin / Gert Vilms	4; 6	4; 6

==== Ghana vs. Madagascar ====
Ghana
2
Amicale Tennis Association, Lomé, Togo
21 January 1998

Madagascar
1

			1	2	3
1	(Ghana) (Madagascar)	Isaac Donkor; Harivony Andrianafetra	6; 3	6; 3
2	(Ghana) (Madagascar)	Franklyn Ofori; Thierry Rajaobelina	4; 6	7^{7} 6^{5}	6; 3
3	(Ghana) (Madagascar)	Gunther Darkey / Isaac Tetteh-Quaye; Jean-Marc Randriamanalina / Germain Rasolondrazana	3; 6	5; 7

==== Cyprus vs. Ghana ====
Cyprus
0
Amicale Tennis Association, Lomé, Togo
22 January 1998

Ghana
3

			1	2	3
1	(Cyprus) (Ghana)	Marinos Baghdatis; Isaac Donkor	6; 3	5; 7	3; 6
2	(Cyprus) (Ghana)	George Kalanov; Franklyn Ofori	2; 6	2; 6
3	(Cyprus) (Ghana)	Demetrios Leontis / Neoclis Neocleous; Gunther Darkey / Isaac Tetteh-Quaye	3; 6	0; 6

==== Estonia vs. Madagascar ====
Estonia
2
Amicale Tennis Association, Lomé, Togo
22 January 1998

Madagascar
1

			1	2	3
1	(Estonia) (Madagascar)	Rene Busch; Harivony Andrianafetra	1; 6	6; 4	6; 4
2	(Estonia) (Madagascar)	Andrei Luzgin; Thierry Rajaobelina	6; 3	4; 6	2; 6
3	(Estonia) (Madagascar)	Alti Vahkal / Gert Vilms; Harivony Andrianafetra / Thierry Rajaobelina	7; 5	7; 5

==== Cyprus vs. Madagascar ====
Cyprus
2
Amicale Tennis Association, Lomé, Togo
23 January 1998

Madagascar
1

			1	2	3
1	(Cyprus) (Madagascar)	Marinos Baghdatis; Germain Rasolondrazana	3; 6	6; 2	6; 3
2	(Cyprus) (Madagascar)	Demetrios Leontis; Jean-Marc Randriamanalina	7^{7} 6^{4}	2; 6	6; 4
3	(Cyprus) (Madagascar)	George Kalanov / Neoclis Neocleous; Harivony Andrianafetra / Germain Rasolondrazana	3; 6	1; 6

==== Estonia vs. Ghana ====
Estonia
2
Amicale Tennis Association, Lomé, Togo
23 January 1998

Ghana
1

			1	2	3
1	(Estonia) (Ghana)	Rene Busch; Isaac Tetteh-Quaye	5; 7	6; 2	6; 0
2	(Estonia) (Ghana)	Alti Vahkal; Gunther Darkey	6; 3	3; 0		retired
3	(Estonia) (Ghana)	Andrei Luzgin / Gert Vilms; Isaac Donkor / Franklyn Ofori	1; 6	2; 6

=== Group B ===
==== Togo vs. Bosnia and Herzegovina ====
Togo
2
Amicale Tennis Association, Lomé, Togo
21 January 1998

Bosnia and Herzegovina
1

			1	2	3
1	(Togo) (Bosnia and Herzegovina)	Jean-Kome Loglo; Meride Zahirović	6; 4	6; 4
2	(Togo) (Bosnia and Herzegovina)	Goudjo Gbedey; Kristijan Čapalik	6; 2	6; 2
3	(Togo) (Bosnia and Herzegovina)	Komi Adeyo / Kossi Loglo; Haris Bašalić / Kristijan Čapalik	4; 6	3; 6

==== Greece vs. Kenya ====
Greece
1
Amicale Tennis Association, Lomé, Togo
21 January 1998

Kenya
2

			1	2	3
1	(Greece) (Kenya)	Nikos Rovas; Allan Cooper	6; 3	3; 6	2; 6
2	(Greece) (Kenya)	Anastasios Vasiliadis; Paul Wekesa	4; 6	4; 6
3	(Greece) (Kenya)	Niko Karagiannis / Anastasios Vasiliadis; Allan Cooper / Norbert Oduor	6; 4	6; 3

==== Togo vs. Greece ====
Togo
3
Amicale Tennis Association, Lomé, Togo
22 January 1998

Greece
0

			1	2	3
1	(Togo) (Greece)	Jean-Kome Loglo; Nikos Rovas	4; 6	6; 3	6; 4
2	(Togo) (Greece)	Goudjo Gbedey; Anastasios Vasiliadis	3; 6	6; 2	6; 1
3	(Togo) (Greece)	Jean-Kome Loglo / Kossi Loglo; Niko Karagiannis / Yannis Vlachos	6^{7} 7^{9}	6; 1	6; 4

==== Bosnia and Herzegovina vs. Kenya ====
Bosnia and Herzegovina
3
Amicale Tennis Association, Lomé, Togo
22 January 1998

Kenya
0

			1	2	3
1	(Bosnia and Herzegovina) (Kenya)	Meride Zahirović; Allan Cooper	6; 4	6; 2
2	(Bosnia and Herzegovina) (Kenya)	Kristijan Čapalik; Paul Wekesa	6; 3	6; 3
3	(Bosnia and Herzegovina) (Kenya)	Haris Bašalić / Kristijan Čapalik; Allan Cooper / Norbert Oduor	6; 3	6; 4

==== Togo vs. Kenya ====
Togo
2
Amicale Tennis Association, Lomé, Togo
23 January 1998

Kenya
1

			1	2	3
1	(Togo) (Kenya)	Jean-Kome Loglo; Allan Cooper	6; 0	6; 4
2	(Togo) (Kenya)	Goudjo Gbedey; Paul Wekesa	6^{5} 7^{7}	1; 1		retired
3	(Togo) (Kenya)	Komi Adeyo / Kossi Loglo; Allan Cooper / Norbert Oduor	1; 6	5; 7

==== Bosnia and Herzegovina vs. Greece ====
Bosnia and Herzegovina
0
Amicale Tennis Association, Lomé, Togo
23 January 1998

Greece
3

			1	2	3
1	(Bosnia and Herzegovina) (Greece)	Meride Zahirović; Nikos Rovas	1; 6	4; 6
2	(Bosnia and Herzegovina) (Greece)	Kristijan Čapalik; Anastasios Vasiliadis	3; 6	2; 6
3	(Bosnia and Herzegovina) (Greece)	Haris Bašalić / Kristijan Čapalik; Niko Karagiannis / Anastasios Vasiliadis	1; 6	4; 6

== 1st to 4th place play-offs ==
=== Semifinals ===
==== Greece vs. Estonia ====
Greece
3
Amicale Tennis Association, Lomé, Togo
24 January 1998

Estonia
0

			1	2	3
1	(Greece) (Estonia)	Nikos Rovas; Alti Vahkal	7; 5	6; 2
2	(Greece) (Estonia)	Anastasios Vasiliadis; Andrei Luzgin	6; 3	6; 4
3	(Greece) (Estonia)	Niko Karagiannis / Yannis Vlachos; Rene Busch / Gert Vilms	6; 3	7; 5

==== Togo vs. Ghana ====
Togo
3
Amicale Tennis Association, Lomé, Togo
24 January 1998

Ghana
0

			1	2	3
1	(Togo) (Ghana)	Jean-Kome Loglo; Isaac Donkor	6; 2	7; 5
2	(Togo) (Ghana)	Goudjo Gbedey; Franklyn Ofori	6; 3	7^{7} 6^{5}
3	(Togo) (Ghana)	Komi Adeyo / Kossi Loglo; Gunther Darkey / Isaac Tetteh-Quaye	6; 1	4; 6	6; 3

=== Final ===
==== Togo vs. Greece ====
Togo
1
Amicale Tennis Association, Lomé, Togo
25 January 1998

Greece
2

			1	2	3
1	(Togo) (Greece)	Jean-Kome Loglo; Nikos Rovas	7^{8} 6^{6}	6; 4
2	(Togo) (Greece)	Goudjo Gbedey; Anastasios Vasiliadis	6^{2} 7^{7}	3; 6
3	(Togo) (Greece)	Jean-Kome Loglo / Kossi Loglo; Niko Karagiannis / Anastasios Vasiliadis	6^{5} 7^{7}	4; 6

=== 3rd to 4th play-off ===
==== Ghana vs. Estonia ====
Ghana
1
Amicale Tennis Association, Lomé, Togo
25 January 1998

Estonia
2

			1	2	3
1	(Ghana) (Estonia)	Isaac Tetteh-Quaye; Andrei Luzgin	3; 6	3; 6
2	(Ghana) (Estonia)	Gunther Darkey; Gert Vilms	7; 5	6; 1
3	(Ghana) (Estonia)	Isaac Donkor / Franklyn Ofori; Andrei Luzgin / Alti Vahkal	7^{7} 6^{5}	3; 6	5; 7

== 5th to 8th place play-offs ==
=== 5th to 8th play-offs ===
==== Kenya vs. Cyprus ====
Kenya
3
Amicale Tennis Association, Lomé, Togo
24 January 1998

Cyprus
0

			1	2	3
1	(Kenya) (Cyprus)	Norbert Oduor; Marinos Baghdatis	4; 6	7^{7} 6^{2}	6; 1
2	(Kenya) (Cyprus)	Allan Cooper; Demetrios Leontis	6; 1	6; 1
3	(Kenya) (Cyprus)	Barry Ndinya / Norbert Oduor; George Kalanov / Neoclis Neocleous	6; 3	6; 4

==== Bosnia and Herzegovina vs. Madagascar ====
Bosnia and Herzegovina
2
Amicale Tennis Association, Lomé, Togo
24 January 1998

Madagascar
1

			1	2	3
1	(Bosnia and Herzegovina) (Madagascar)	Meride Zahirović; Jean-Marc Randriamanalina	6; 2	6; 1
2	(Bosnia and Herzegovina) (Madagascar)	Kristijan Čapalik; Thierry Rajaobelina	6; 1	7; 5
3	(Bosnia and Herzegovina) (Madagascar)	Haris Bašalić / Igor Stjepić; Harivony Andrianafetra / Thierry Rajaobelina	6^{3} 7^{7}	3; 6

=== 5th to 6th play-off ===
==== Bosnia and Herzegovina vs. Kenya ====
Bosnia and Herzegovina
3
Amicale Tennis Association, Lomé, Togo
25 January 1998

Kenya
0

			1	2	3
1	(Bosnia and Herzegovina) (Kenya)	Meride Zahirović; Barry Ndinya	6; 1	6; 2
2	(Bosnia and Herzegovina) (Kenya)	Kristijan Čapalik; Allan Cooper	6; 2	6; 2
3	(Bosnia and Herzegovina) (Kenya)	Haris Bašalić / Igor Stjepić; Barry Ndinya / Norbert Oduor	6; 2	6; 3

=== 7th to 8th play-off ===
==== Madagascar vs. Cyprus ====
Madagascar
3
Amicale Tennis Association, Lomé, Togo
25 January 1998

Cyprus
0

			1	2	3
1	(Madagascar) (Cyprus)	Harivony Andrianafetra; Neoclis Neocleous	6; 4	6; 1
2	(Madagascar) (Cyprus)	Thierry Rajaobelina; George Kalanov	7^{7} 6^{2}	7; 5
3	(Madagascar) (Cyprus)	Jean-Marc Randriamanalina / Germain Rasolondrazana; Marinos Baghdatis / Demetrios Leontis	6; 3	4; 6	6; 2
