= 2011 Green World ATP Challenger =

- Date: 21–27 March
- Edition: 1st
- Location: Pingguo, China

Champions

Singles
- (Japan) Go Soeda

Doubles
- (Russia) Mikhail Elgin / (Russia) Alexander Kudryavtsev
Green World ATP Challenger	· 2012 →

The 2011 Green World ATP Challenger was a professional tennis tournament played on hard courts. It was the first edition of the tournament which was part of the 2011 ATP Challenger Tour. It took place in Pingguo, China between 21 and 27 March 2011.

== ATP entrants ==
=== Seeds ===
Country	Player	Rank^{1}	Seed
JPN	Go Soeda	109	1
SVK	Lukáš Lacko	119	2
BEL	Steve Darcis	129	3
RUS	Alexander Kudryavtsev	144	4
GER	Matthias Bachinger	160	5
JPN	Tatsuma Ito	173	6
JPN	Yūichi Sugita	177	7
BLR	Uladzimir Ignatik	200	8

=== Other entrants ===
The following players received wildcards into the singles main draw:

- (China) Chang Yu
- (China) Gong Maoxin
- (China) Li Zhe
- (China) Zhang Ze

The following players received entry from the qualifying draw:

- (United Kingdom) Jamie Baker
- (United Kingdom) Colin Fleming
- (South Korea) Jun Woong-sun
- (Chinese Taipei) Yang Tsung-hua

== Champions ==
=== Singles ===
(Japan) Go Soeda def. (Germany) Matthias Bachinger, 6–4, 7–5

=== Doubles ===
(Russia) Mikhail Elgin / (Russia) Alexander Kudryavtsev def. (Finland) Harri Heliövaara / (New Zealand) Jose Rubin Statham, 6–3, 6–2
