= 2009 Status Athens Open =

- Date: April 6 – April 12
- Edition: 3rd
- Location: Athens, Greece

Champions

Singles
- (Portugal) Rui Machado

Doubles
- (Australia) Rameez Junaid / (Germany) Philipp Marx
← 2008 ·	Status Athens Open	· 2010 →

The 2009 Status Athens Open was a professional tennis tournament played on outdoor clay courts. It was part of the 2009 ATP Challenger Tour. It took place in Athens, Greece between 6 and 12 April 2009.

== Singles entrants ==
=== Seeds ===
Nationality	Player	Ranking*	Seeding
CZE	Ivo Minář	96	1
UZB	Denis Istomin	106	2
ROU	Victor Crivoi	115	3
CRO	Roko Karanušić	116	4
CZE	Jiří Vaněk	122	5
URU	Pablo Cuevas	129	6
SRB	Ilija Bozoljac	133	7
CZE	Lukáš Rosol	137	8

- Rankings are as of March 23, 2009.

=== Other entrants ===
The following players received wildcards into the singles main draw:

- (Greece) Konstantinos Economidis
- (Greece) Alexandros-Ferdinandos Georgoudas
- (Greece) Alex Jakupovic
- (Germany) Dimitris Kleftakos

The following players received entry from the qualifying draw:

- (Italy) Leonardo Azzaro
- (Czech Republic) Jan Hájek
- (Czech Republic) Dušan Lojda
- (Australia) Joseph Sirianni

== Champions ==
=== Men's singles ===
(Portugal) Rui Machado def. (Spain) Daniel Muñoz de la Nava, 6–3, 7–6(4)

=== Men's doubles ===
(Australia) Rameez Junaid / (Germany) Philipp Marx def. (Netherlands) Jesse Huta Galung / (Portugal) Rui Machado, 6–4, 6–3
