= 2012 Green World ATP Challenger – Doubles =

Doubles
- 2012 Green World ATP Challenger

Final
- Champions: (United States) John Paul Fruttero (South Africa) Raven Klaasen
- Runners-up: (Australia) Colin Ebelthite (Australia) Samuel Groth
- Score: 6–2, 6–4

Events
Singles	Doubles
← 2011 ·	Green World ATP Challenger	· 2013 →

Michail Elgin and Alexander Kudryavtsev were the defending champions but decided not to participate.
John Paul Fruttero and Raven Klaasen won the final 6–2, 6–4 against Colin Ebelthite and Samuel Groth.

== Seeds ==
1. (United States) John Paul Fruttero / (South Africa) Raven Klaasen (champions)
2. (Thailand) Sanchai Ratiwatana / (Thailand) Sonchat Ratiwatana (quarterfinals)
3. (Finland) Harri Heliövaara / (Ukraine) Denys Molchanov (semifinals)
4. (Chinese Taipei) Hsieh Cheng-peng / (Chinese Taipei) Lee Hsin-han (first round)

== Draw ==
=== Key ===
- Q = Qualifier
- WC = Wild card
- LL = Lucky loser
- Alt = Alternate
- SE = Special exempt
- PR = Protected ranking
- ITF = ITF entry
- JE = Junior exempt
- w/o = Walkover
- r = Retired
- d = Defaulted
- SR = Special ranking

=== Draw ===
First round
1	(United States) JP Fruttero (South Africa) R Klaasen	6	6
(Slovakia) K Čapkovič (Israel) A Weintraub	1	2
(Japan) T Matsui (Japan) Hiroki Moriya	6	2	[6]
(Chinese Taipei) J Wang (Chinese Taipei) T-h Yang	3	6	[10]
3	(Finland) H Heliövaara (Ukraine) D Molchanov	6	6
WC	(Singapore) R Hobbs (China) Yang Qinnong	1	0
(Germany) S Rieschick (Thailand) D Udomchoke	6	6
(China) Xue Feng (China) Z Zhang	2	3
(Italy) R Ghedin (Indonesia) C Rungkat	6	7
WC	(China) Bai Yan (China) Ma Ya-Nan	2	5
(Australia) C Ebelthite (Australia) S Groth	7	6
4	(Chinese Taipei) C-p Hsieh (Chinese Taipei) H-h Lee	5	3
WC	(China) Chang Yu (South Korea) S-y Jeong	5	6	[10]
(United States) K Kim (South Korea) D Yoo	7	4	[8]
(India) D Sharan (India) V Vardhan	6^{3}	4
2	(Thailand) Sa Ratiwatana (Thailand) So Ratiwatana	7^{7}	6

Quarterfinals
1	(United States) JP Fruttero (South Africa) R Klaasen	4	6	[10]
(Chinese Taipei) J Wang (Chinese Taipei) T-h Yang	6	3	[8]
3	(Finland) H Heliövaara (Ukraine) D Molchanov	6	6
(Germany) S Rieschick (Thailand) D Udomchoke	3	2
(Italy) R Ghedin (Indonesia) C Rungkat	3	4
(Australia) C Ebelthite (Australia) S Groth	6	6
WC	(China) Chang Yu (South Korea) S-y Jeong	6	4	[10]
2	(Thailand) Sa Ratiwatana (Thailand) So Ratiwatana	2	6	[7]

Semifinals
1	(United States) JP Fruttero (South Africa) R Klaasen	6	6
3	(Finland) H Heliövaara (Ukraine) D Molchanov	3	3
(Australia) C Ebelthite (Australia) S Groth	6	6
WC	(China) Chang Yu (South Korea) S-y Jeong	4	4

Final
1	(United States) JP Fruttero (South Africa) R Klaasen	6	6
(Australia) C Ebelthite (Australia) S Groth	2	4
