= 2010 Status Athens Open =

- Date: April 19 – April 25
- Edition: 4th
- Location: Athens, Greece

Champions

Singles
- (Chinese Taipei) Lu Yen-hsun

Doubles
- (South Africa) Rik de Voest / (Chinese Taipei) Lu Yen-hsun
← 2009 ·	Status Athens Open	· 2011 →

The 2010 Status Athens Open was a professional tennis tournament played on outdoor hard courts. It was part of the 2010 ATP Challenger Tour. It took place in Athens, Greece between 19 and 25 April 2010.

== ATP entrants ==
=== Seeds ===
Nationality	Player	Ranking*	Seeding
GER	Benjamin Becker	40	1
GER	Philipp Petzschner	49	2
SUI	Marco Chiudinelli	59	3
SVK	Lukáš Lacko	65	4
ISR	Dudi Sela	70	5
BEL	Xavier Malisse	81	6
GER	Rainer Schüttler	91	7
TPE	Lu Yen-hsun	99	8

- Rankings are as of April 12, 2010.

=== Other entrants ===
The following players received wildcards into the singles main draw:

- (Greece) Theodoros Angelinos
- (Germany) Benjamin Becker
- (Greece) Konstantinos Economidis
- (Greece) Alex Jakupovic

The following players received entry from the qualifying draw:

- (Lithuania) Ričardas Berankis
- (Latvia) Andis Juška
- (Slovakia) Miloslav Mečíř Jr.
- (Israel) Noam Okun

The following players received the lucky loser spot:

- (South Africa) Rik de Voest
- (Germany) Simon Stadler

== Champions ==
=== Singles ===
(Chinese Taipei) Lu Yen-hsun def. (Germany) Rainer Schüttler, 3–6, 7–6(4), 6–4

=== Doubles ===
(South Africa) Rik de Voest / (Chinese Taipei) Lu Yen-hsun def. (Netherlands) Robin Haase / (Netherlands) Igor Sijsling, 6–3, 6–4
