= 2012 Green World ATP Challenger – Singles =

Singles
- 2012 Green World ATP Challenger

Final
- Champion: (Japan) Go Soeda
- Runner-up: (Tunisia) Malek Jaziri
- Score: 6–1, 3–6, 7–5

Events
Singles	Doubles
← 2011 ·	Green World ATP Challenger	· 2013 →

Go Soeda successfully defended his title, defeating Malek Jaziri 6–1, 3–6, 7–5 in the final.

== Seeds ==
1. (Japan) Go Soeda (champion)
2. (Tunisia) Malek Jaziri (finals)
3. (Thailand) Danai Udomchoke (first round)
4. (Chinese Taipei) Yang Tsung-hua (second round)
5. (Israel) Amir Weintraub (quarterfinals)
6. (Chinese Taipei) Jimmy Wang (quarterfinals)
7. (Australia) Benjamin Mitchell (quarterfinals)
8. (Finland) Harri Heliövaara (second round)

== Draw ==
Key

- Q = Qualifier
- WC = Wild card
- LL = Lucky loser
- Alt = Alternate
- ITF = ITF entry
- PR = Protected ranking
- SR = Special ranking
- SE = Special exempt
- JE = Junior exempt
- JR = Junior Accelerator Programme entrant
- CO = College Accelerator Programme entrant
- NG = Next Gen Accelerator Program entrant
- w/o = Walkover
- r = Retired
- d = Defaulted

=== Finals ===
Semifinals
1	(Japan) Go Soeda	7	6
(Slovakia) Kamil Čapkovič	5	3
(Ukraine) Denys Molchanov	1	0^{r}
2	(Tunisia) Malek Jaziri	6	1

Final
1	(Japan) Go Soeda	6	3	7
2	(Tunisia) Malek Jaziri	1	6	5

=== Top half ===
First round
1	(Japan) G Soeda	6	6
(India) V Vardhan	4	2
(Australia) S Groth	6	6
(Italy) Enrico Becuzzi	0	2
(United States) K Kim	7^{7}	6
Q	(Indonesia) C Rungkat	6^{3}	0
(India) D Sharan	3	6	1
7	(Australia) B Mitchell	6	4	6
4	(Chinese Taipei) T-h Yang	6	7
Q	(China) Y Bai	3	5
(Italy) R Ghedin	7	2	4
(Slovakia) K Čapkovič	5	6	6
(Germany) S Rieschick	3	6	7
(Japan) Hiroki Moriya	6	2	5
WC	(China) Wang Hufu	4	0
5	(Israel) A Weintraub	6	6

Second round
1	(Japan) G Soeda	7^{7}	6
(Australia) S Groth	6^{3}	3
(United States) K Kim	7^{7}	3	4
7	(Australia) B Mitchell	6^{1}	6	6
4	(Chinese Taipei) T-h Yang	2	0
(Slovakia) K Čapkovič	6	6
(Germany) S Rieschick	6^{4}	4
5	(Israel) A Weintraub	7^{7}	6

Quarterfinals
1	(Japan) G Soeda	6	7
7	(Australia) B Mitchell	3	5
(Slovakia) K Čapkovič	7^{7}	6
5	(Israel) A Weintraub	6^{4}	0

Semifinals
1	(Japan) G Soeda	7	6
(Slovakia) K Čapkovič	5	3

=== Bottom half ===
First round
8	(Finland) H Heliövaara	6	6
(Chinese Taipei) T Chen	2	4
Q	(China) Feng Nian	4	2
(Ukraine) D Molchanov	6	6
(South Africa) R Klaasen	1^{r}
(China) Z Zhang	6
(Japan) T Matsui	1	6	6
3	(Thailand) D Udomchoke	6	4	4
6	(Chinese Taipei) J Wang	5	6	6
(South Korea) D Yoo	7	2	2
WC	(China) Ma Ya-nan	3	5
(South Korea) S-y Jeong	6	7
Q	(China) Li Yu Cheng	7^{7}	6
WC	(China) Feng He	6^{3}	2
WC	(China) Chang Yu	4	2
2	(Tunisia) M Jaziri	6	6

Second round
8	(Finland) H Heliövaara	5	5
(Ukraine) D Molchanov	7	7
(China) Z Zhang	7	7
(Japan) T Matsui	5	5
6	(Chinese Taipei) J Wang	7	7
(South Korea) S-y Jeong	5	5
Q	(China) Li Yu Cheng	2	2
2	(Tunisia) M Jaziri	6	6

Quarterfinals
(Ukraine) D Molchanov	4	7^{8}	7^{7}
(China) Z Zhang	6	6^{6}	6^{4}
6	(Chinese Taipei) J Wang	2	6^{3}
2	(Tunisia) M Jaziri	6	7^{7}

Semifinals
(Ukraine) D Molchanov	1	0^{r}
2	(Tunisia) M Jaziri	6	1
