= 2012 Status Athens Open =

Tennis tournament

- Date: 7–13 May
- Edition: 5th
- Surface: Hard
- Location: Athens, Greece

Champions

Singles
- (Australia) Marinko Matosevic

Doubles
- (Germany) Andre Begemann / (Australia) Jordan Kerr
← 2011 ·	Status Athens Open	· 2013 →

The 2012 Status Athens Open was a professional tennis tournament played on hard courts. It was the fifth edition of the tournament which was part of the 2012 ATP Challenger Tour. It took place in Athens, Greece between 7 and 13 May 2012.

== Singles main-draw entrants ==
=== Seeds ===
Country	Player	Rank^{1}	Seed
RUS	Igor Kunitsyn	88	1
SVK	Karol Beck	111	2
EST	Jürgen Zopp	120	3
AUS	Marinko Matosevic	122	4
BEL	Ruben Bemelmans	145	5
RUS	Alexander Kudryavtsev	164	6
RUS	Konstantin Kravchuk	190	7
LTU	Laurynas Grigelis	193	8

- ^{1} Rankings are as of April 30, 2012.

=== Other entrants ===
The following players received wildcards into the singles main draw:

- (Greece) Theodoros Angelinos
- (Greece) Konstantinos Economidis
- (Greece) Alexandros Jakupovic
- (Greece) Markos Kalovelonis

The following players received entry from the qualifying draw:

- (Serbia) Ilija Bozoljac
- (Belarus) Aliaksandr Bury
- (Italy) Riccardo Ghedin
- (Austria) Nikolaus Moser

== Champions ==
=== Singles ===
- (Australia) Marinko Matosevic def. (Belgium) Ruben Bemelmans, 6–3, 6–4

=== Doubles ===
- (Germany) Andre Begemann / (Australia) Jordan Kerr def. (Spain) Gerard Granollers / (Greece) Alexandros Jakupovic, 6–2, 6–3
