= 2011 Green World ATP Challenger – Doubles =

Doubles
- 2011 Green World ATP Challenger

Final
- Champions: (Russia) Michail Elgin (Russia) Alexandre Kudryavtsev
- Runners-up: (Finland) Harri Heliövaara (New Zealand) Jose Rubin Statham
- Score: 6–3, 6–2

Events
Singles	Doubles
← 2010 ·	Green World ATP Challenger	· 2012 →

Michail Elgin and Alexandre Kudryavtsev won the first edition of the tournament. They defeated Harri Heliövaara and Jose Rubin Statham 6–3, 6–2 in the final.

== Seeds ==
1. (United Kingdom) Colin Fleming / (United Kingdom) Ross Hutchins (semifinals)
2. (Austria) Philipp Oswald / (Austria) Alexander Peya (first round)
3. (Thailand) Sanchai Ratiwatana / (Thailand) Sonchat Ratiwatana (quarterfinals)
4. (Russia) Michail Elgin / (Russia) Alexandre Kudryavtsev (champions)

== Draw ==
=== Key ===
- Q = Qualifier
- WC = Wild card
- LL = Lucky loser
- Alt = Alternate
- SE = Special exempt
- PR = Protected ranking
- ITF = ITF entry
- JE = Junior exempt
- w/o = Walkover
- r = Retired
- d = Defaulted
- SR = Special ranking

=== Draw ===
First round
1	(United Kingdom) C Fleming (United Kingdom) R Hutchins	6	6
(China) M Gong (China) Z Li	2	4
WC	(China) Chang Yu (China) Zhou Zhuoqing	6	1	[10]
WC	(China) D Wu (China) Z Zhang	4	6	4
4	(Russia) M Elgin (Russia) A Kudryavtsev	6	6
(Australia) S Kadir (Chinese Taipei) T-h Yang	4	2
WC	(China) Gao Peng (China) W Gao	4	4
(Belarus) U Ignatik (Austria) N Moser	6	6
PR	(Spain) A Brugués-Davi (Portugal) J Sousa	3	7	[7]
(Finland) H Heliövaara (New Zealand) JR Statham	6	6^{6}	[10]
PR	(Germany) S Rieschick (Thailand) D Udomchoke	1	3
3	(Thailand) Sa Ratiwatana (Thailand) So Ratiwatana	6	6
(Croatia) N Mektić (Croatia) I Zovko	6^{5}	7	[7]
(Japan) T Ito (Japan) H Kondo	7	6^{8}	[10]
(Russia) E Kirillov (Netherlands) M Middelkoop	2	6	[11]
2	(Austria) P Oswald (Austria) A Peya	6	2	[9]

Quarterfinals
1	(United Kingdom) C Fleming (United Kingdom) R Hutchins	6	6
WC	(China) Chang Yu (China) Zhou Zhuoqing	3	4
4	(Russia) M Elgin (Russia) A Kudryavtsev	7	7
(Belarus) U Ignatik (Austria) N Moser	6^{4}	6^{9}
(Finland) H Heliövaara (New Zealand) JR Statham	6	5	[10]
3	(Thailand) Sa Ratiwatana (Thailand) So Ratiwatana	1	7	[5]
(Japan) T Ito (Japan) H Kondo	5	6	[7]
(Russia) E Kirillov (Netherlands) M Middelkoop	7	4	[10]

Semifinals
1	(United Kingdom) C Fleming (United Kingdom) R Hutchins	4	6^{4}
4	(Russia) M Elgin (Russia) A Kudryavtsev	6	7
(Finland) H Heliövaara (New Zealand) JR Statham	6	7
(Russia) E Kirillov (Netherlands) M Middelkoop	1	5

Final
4	(Russia) M Elgin (Russia) A Kudryavtsev	6	6
(Finland) H Heliövaara (New Zealand) JR Statham	3	2
