= Anastasios Vasiliadis =

Greek tennis player (born 1974)

Anastasios Vasiliadis Αναστάσιος Βασιλειάδης
- Country (sports): Greece
- Born: 16 February 1974 (age 51)
- Prize money: $30,952

Singles
- Career record: 0–1
- Highest ranking: No. 365 (7 June 1999)

Grand Slam singles results
- Australian Open: Q2 (1995)
- French Open: —
- Wimbledon: Q1 (1999)
- US Open: —

Doubles
- Career record: 4–1
- Highest ranking: No. 463 (28 October 2002)
Medal record
Mediterranean Games
Gold medal – first place	2001 Tunis	Doubles

Anastasios "Taso" Vasiliadis (Greek: Αναστάσιος "Τάσο" Βασιλειάδης, born 16 February 1974) is a retired professional Greek tennis player. As a junior player, he represented Australia at the 1990 Junior Davis Cup and reached the quarterfinals at the Australian Open in 1992, where he lost to future world No. 42 and then countryman Scott Draper 10–8 in the third and deciding set.

He switched allegiances later on, and as a professional he represented Greece at the Davis Cup and at the Mediterranean Games. A doubles specialist, he prevailed in four out of five matches in Davis Cup, and won a bronze medal at the 2001 Mediterranean Games, always partnering with Konstantinos Economidis.
