= Tennis at the 2001 Mediterranean Games =

The Tennis Tournament at the 2001 Mediterranean Games was held in El Menzah, Tunisia from September 5–8. The Greek player Konstantinos Economidis Italian and Leonardo Azzaro reached the finals.

== Men's Final Eight ==
Quarterfinals
?	(Greece) Konstantinos Economidis	6	2	6
?	(Tunisia) Walid Jallali	2	6	1
?	(Morocco) Mehdi Tahiri	6	7
?	(Spain) Feliciano López	1	5
?	(Italy) Leonardo Azzaro	6	6
?	(Morocco) Mounir El Aarej	2	3
?	(Slovenia) Marko Tkalec	7	6
?	(Greece) Nikos Rovas	6	2

Semifinals
?	(Greece) Konstantinos Economidis	4	6	6
?	(Morocco) Mehdi Tahiri	6	4	3
?	(Italy) Leonardo Azzaro	6	6
?	(Slovenia) Marko Tkalec	2	4

Finals
?	(Greece) Konstantinos Economidis	6	6^{9}	6
?	(Italy) Leonardo Azzaro	4	7	3
Third place
?	(Morocco) Mehdi Tahiri	2	6	6
?	(Slovenia) Marko Tkalec	6	3	4
