= 2012 Green World ATP Challenger =

- Date: 12–18 March
- Edition: 2nd
- Location: Pingguo, China

Champions

Singles
- (Japan) Go Soeda

Doubles
- (United States) John Paul Fruttero / (South Africa) Raven Klaasen
- Green World ATP Challenger

The 2012 Green World ATP Challenger was a professional tennis tournament played on hard courts. It was the second edition of the tournament which was part of the 2012 ATP Challenger Tour. It took place in Pingguo, China between 12 and 18 March 2012.

== Single main-draw entrants ==
=== Seeds ===
Country	Player	Rank^{1}	Seed
JPN	Go Soeda	77	1
TUN	Malek Jaziri	104	2
THA	Danai Udomchoke	167	3
TPE	Yang Tsung-hua	184	4
ISR	Amir Weintraub	203	5
TPE	Jimmy Wang	209	6
AUS	Benjamin Mitchell	218	7
FIN	Harri Heliövaara	219	8

- ^{1} Rankings are as of March 5, 2012.

=== Other entrants ===
The following players received wildcards into the singles main draw:

- (China) Chang Yu
- (China) Feng He
- (China) Ma Ya-nan
- (China) Wang Hufu

The following players received entry from the qualifying draw:

- (China) Bai Yan
- (China) Feng Nian
- (China) Li Yu Cheng
- (Indonesia) Christopher Rungkat

== Champions ==
=== Singles ===
- (Japan) Go Soeda def. (Tunisia) Malek Jaziri, 6–1, 3–6, 7–5

=== Doubles ===
- (United States) John Paul Fruttero / (South Africa) Raven Klaasen def. (Australia) Colin Ebelthite / (Australia) Samuel Groth, 6–2, 6–4
