= 2007 Wimbledon Championships – Men's doubles qualifying =

Men's doubles qualifying
- 2007 Wimbledon Championships

Events
Singles	men	women		boys	girls
Doubles	men	women	mixed	boys	girls
WC Singles	men	women	quad
WC Doubles	men	women	quad
Legends	men	women	seniors

Qualification
Singles	men	women
Doubles	men	women
- Wimbledon Championships

Players and pairs who neither have high enough rankings nor receive wild cards may participate in a qualifying tournament held one week before the annual Wimbledon Tennis Championships.

== Seeds ==
1. (United States) Scott Lipsky / (United States) David Martin (qualified)
2. (Israel) Harel Levy / (United States) Rajeev Ram (qualified)
3. (South Africa) Rik de Voest / (Australia) Nathan Healey (first round)
4. (Germany) Lars Burgsmüller / (Ukraine) Orest Tereshchuk (qualifying competition, lucky losers)
5. (Thailand) Sanchai Ratiwatana / (Thailand) Sonchat Ratiwatana (qualifying competition, lucky losers)
6. (India) Rohan Bopanna / (Croatia) Lovro Zovko (first round)
7. (Argentina) Brian Dabul / (Netherlands Antilles) Jean-Julien Rojer (first round)
8. (United States) Alex Kuznetsov / (Germany) Mischa Zverev (qualified)

== Qualifiers ==
1. (United States) Scott Lipsky / (United States) David Martin
2. (Israel) Harel Levy / (United States) Rajeev Ram
3. (Serbia) Ilija Bozoljac / (Belgium) Dick Norman
4. (United States) Alex Kuznetsov / (Germany) Mischa Zverev

== Lucky losers ==
1. (Germany) Lars Burgsmüller / (Ukraine) Orest Tereshchuk
2. (Thailand) Sanchai Ratiwatana / (Thailand) Sonchat Ratiwatana
3. (United States) Kevin Kim / (Australia) Robert Smeets

== Qualifying draw ==
=== First qualifier ===
First round
1	(United States) Scott Lipsky (United States) David Martin	6	6
(Chile) Paul Capdeville (Argentina) Horacio Zeballos	2	3
(Italy) Flavio Cipolla (Greece) Konstantinos Economidis	5	6	10
6	(India) Rohan Bopanna (Croatia) Lovro Zovko	7	2	8

Qualifying competition
1	(United States) Scott Lipsky (United States) David Martin	6	6	6
(Italy) Flavio Cipolla (Greece) Konstantinos Economidis	0	4	3

=== Second qualifier ===
First round
2	(Israel) Harel Levy (United States) Rajeev Ram	6	6
WC	(United Kingdom) Ian Flanagan (United Kingdom) Tom Rushby	1	2
(United States) Kevin Kim (Australia) Robert Smeets	6	6
7	(Argentina) Brian Dabul (Netherlands Antilles) Jean-Julien Rojer	3	2

Qualifying competition
2	(Israel) Harel Levy (United States) Rajeev Ram	6	6	7^{7}
(United States) Kevin Kim (Australia) Robert Smeets	3	4	6^{2}

=== Third qualifier ===
First round
3	(South Africa) Rik de Voest (Australia) Nathan Healey	6^{2}	6^{4}
(Serbia) Ilija Bozoljac (Belgium) Dick Norman	7^{7}	7^{7}
WC	(United Kingdom) Richard Irwin (United Kingdom) James Ward	4	2
5	(Thailand) Sanchai Ratiwatana (Thailand) Sonchat Ratiwatana	6	6

Qualifying competition
(Serbia) Ilija Bozoljac (Belgium) Dick Norman	7^{8}	6	6
5	(Thailand) Sanchai Ratiwatana (Thailand) Sonchat Ratiwatana	6^{6}	4	4

=== Fourth qualifier ===
First round
4	(Germany) Lars Burgsmüller (Ukraine) Orest Tereshchuk	6	7^{7}
(France) Jérôme Haehnel (France) Jo-Wilfried Tsonga	2	6^{5}
Alt	(France) Thomas Oger (France) Nicolas Tourte	4	6	3
8	(United States) Alex Kuznetsov (Germany) Mischa Zverev	6	4	6

Qualifying competition
4	(Germany) Lars Burgsmüller (Ukraine) Orest Tereshchuk	3	1	6^{5}
8	(United States) Alex Kuznetsov (Germany) Mischa Zverev	6	6	7^{7}
