= 2011 Green World ATP Challenger – Singles =

Singles
- 2011 Green World ATP Challenger

Final
- Champion: (Japan) Go Soeda
- Runner-up: (Germany) Matthias Bachinger
- Score: 6–4, 7–5

Events
Singles	Doubles
- Green World ATP Challenger

Go Soeda declared as champion after defeating Matthias Bachinger with score 6–4, 7–5 in the final.

== Seeds ==
1. (Japan) Go Soeda (champion)
2. (Slovakia) Lukáš Lacko (semifinals)
3. (Belgium) Steve Darcis (quarterfinals)
4. (Russia) Alexander Kudryavtsev (first round)
5. (Germany) Matthias Bachinger (final)
6. (Japan) Tatsuma Ito (first round)
7. (Japan) Yūichi Sugita (quarterfinals)
8. (Belarus) Uladzimir Ignatik (quarterfinals)

== Draw ==
Key

- Q = Qualifier
- WC = Wild card
- LL = Lucky loser
- Alt = Alternate
- ITF = ITF entry
- PR = Protected ranking
- SR = Special ranking
- SE = Special exempt
- JE = Junior exempt
- JR = Junior Accelerator Programme entrant
- CO = College Accelerator Programme entrant
- NG = Next Gen Accelerator Program entrant
- w/o = Walkover
- r = Retired
- d = Defaulted

=== Finals ===
Semifinals
1	(Japan) Go Soeda	6	6
SE	(Germany) Cedrik-Marcel Stebe	3	2
5	(Germany) Matthias Bachinger	6	7
2	(Slovakia) Lukáš Lacko	1	6^{3}

Final
1	(Japan) Go Soeda	6	7
5	(Germany) Matthias Bachinger	4	5

=== Top half ===
First round
1	(Japan) G Soeda	6	7
Q	(United Kingdom) J Baker	3	6^{6}
(Croatia) A Veić	6	6
(Italy) T Fabbiano	3	4
(India) K Rastogi	1	2
PR	(Spain) A Brugués Davi	6	6
Q	(United Kingdom) C Fleming	6	5	6
6	(Japan) T Ito	2	7	3
4	(Russia) A Kudryavtsev	6	2	5
SE	(Germany) C-M Stebe	2	6	7
WC	(China) Z Zhang	5	6^{r}
(Finland) H Heliövaara	7	6
(Netherlands) M Middelkoop	6	6
(Russia) E Kirillov	4	2
Q	(Chinese Taipei) T-h Yang	4	4
8	(Belarus) U Ignatik	6	6

Second round
1	(Japan) G Soeda	6	6
(Croatia) A Veić	4	1
PR	(Spain) A Brugués Davi	6	3	4
Q	(United Kingdom) C Fleming	4	6	6
SE	(Germany) C-M Stebe	7	6
(Finland) H Heliövaara	5	4
(Netherlands) M Middelkoop	4	5
8	(Belarus) U Ignatik	6	7

Quarterfinals
1	(Japan) G Soeda	6	6
Q	(United Kingdom) C Fleming	4	1
SE	(Germany) C-M Stebe	7	6^{4}	6
8	(Belarus) U Ignatik	6^{3}	7	3

Semifinals
1	(Japan) G Soeda	6	6
SE	(Germany) C-M Stebe	3	2

=== Bottom half ===
First round
5	(Germany) M Bachinger	6	6
PR	(Thailand) D Udomchoke	1	3
(Germany) S Rieschick	1	3
(Belgium) D Goffin	6	6
(Austria) A Peya	5	0^{r}
(Portugal) J Sousa	7	0
WC	(China) Chang Yu	5	1
3	(Belgium) S Darcis	7	6
7	(Japan) Y Sugita	3	7	7
(Croatia) N Mektić	6	6^{4}	6^{7}
WC	(China) Z Li	7	7
Q	(South Korea) W-s Jun	6^{3}	5
(China) M Gong	2	6	4
WC	(China) D Wu	6	3	6
(Ukraine) S Bubka	3	5
2	(Slovakia) L Lacko	6	7

Second round
5	(Germany) M Bachinger	w/o
(Belgium) D Goffin
(Portugal) J Sousa	2	3
3	(Belgium) S Darcis	6	6
7	(Japan) Y Sugita	6	3	6
WC	(China) Z Li	4	6	3
WC	(China) D Wu	3	0
2	(Slovakia) L Lacko	6	6

Quarterfinals
5	(Germany) M Bachinger	7	6
3	(Belgium) S Darcis	6^{4}	4
7	(Japan) Y Sugita	0	1^{r}
2	(Slovakia) L Lacko	6	4

Semifinals
5	(Germany) M Bachinger	6	7
2	(Slovakia) L Lacko	1	6^{3}
