= John Paul Fruttero =

American tennis player

- Country (sports): United States
- Residence: West Los Angeles, United States
- Born: April 30, 1981 (age 45) Montebello, United States
- Height: 1.85 m (6 ft 1 in)
- Turned pro: 2000
- Retired: 2024 (last match played)
- Plays: Right-handed
- Prize money: US $218,258

Singles
- Career record: 0–1
- Career titles: 0
- Highest ranking: No. 183 (21 November 2005)

Grand Slam singles results
- Australian Open: Q3 (2006)
- Wimbledon: Q1 (2006)
- US Open: Q1 (2005, 2006)

Doubles
- Career record: 2–10
- Career titles: 0
- Highest ranking: No. 83 (7 May 2012)

Grand Slam doubles results
- Wimbledon: Q1 (2012)

John Paul Fruttero (born April 30, 1981) is an American former professional tennis player. He competes mainly on the ATP Challenger Tour and ITF Futures, both in singles and doubles. He reached a career-high ATP singles ranking of No. 183 achieved on 21 November 2005 and a doubles ranking of No. 83 achieved on 7 May 2012.

JP (as he is more commonly known by) has won 3 singles titles and 18 doubles titles on the ATP Challenger and ITF Futures tours.

He prefers playing on hard courts, and uses a Babolat tennis racket.

== ATP Challenger and ITF Futures finals ==
=== Singles: 6 (3–3) ===
Legend (singles) ATP Challenger Tour (1–0) ITF Futures Tour (2–3)	Finals by surface Hard (3–3) Clay (0–0) Grass (0–0) Carpet (0–0)

Result	W–L	Date	Tournament	Tier	Surface	Opponent	Score
Win	1–0	Jun 2002	USA F14, Sunnyvale	Futures	Hard	(Japan) Michihisa Onoda	6–4, 6–7^{(4–7)}, 6–4
Loss	1–1	Sep 2002	Mexico F14, Mazatlan	Futures	Hard	(Mexico) Marcelo Amador	2–6, 7–5, 6–7^{(2–7)}
Win	2–1	Jan 2005	Guatemala F1, Guatemala City	Futures	Hard	(Brazil) Bruno Soares	6–3, 6–3
Loss	2–2	Feb 2005	New Zealand F2, North Shore	Futures	Hard	(Sweden) Alexander Hartman	6–7^{(4–7)}, 5–7
Win	3–2	Aug 2005	Belo Horizonte, Brazil	Challenger	Hard	(Denmark) Kristian Pless	7–6^{(7–4)}, 7–6^{(8–6)}
Loss	3–3	Jan 2007	Guatemala F1, Guatemala City	Futures	Hard	(Canada) Peter Polansky	3–6, 3–6

=== Doubles: 41 (18–23) ===
Legend (doubles) ATP Challenger Tour (6–11) ITF Futures Tour (12–12)	Finals by surface Hard (18–23) Clay (0–0) Grass (0–0) Carpet (0–0)

Result	W–L	Date	Tournament	Tier	Surface	Partner	Opponents	Score
Win	1–0	Aug 2002	USA F22, Decatur	Futures	Hard	(United States) Bobby Reynolds	(United States) Trace Fielding (United States) Bo Hodge	walkover
Loss	1–1	Oct 2002	USA F26, Arlington	Futures	Hard	(United States) Jason Marshall	(United States) Huntley Montgomery (United States) Tripp Phillips	0–6, 4–6
Loss	1–2	Dec 2002	Jamaica F20, Montego Bay	Futures	Hard	(United States) Mirko Pehar	(France) Cedric Kauffmann (Paraguay) Francisco Rodríguez	2–6, 6–1, 1–6
Loss	1–3	Dec 2002	Jamaica F21, Montego Bay	Futures	Hard	(United States) Mirko Pehar	(South Africa) Raven Klassen (United States) Michael Kosta	4–6, 4–6
Win	2–3	Jun 2003	USA F16, Auburn	Futures	Hard	(United States) Bobby Reynolds	(United States) J.C. Corkery (United States) James Pade	6–4, 6–4
Loss	2–4	Oct 2005	Sacramento, United States	Challenger	Hard	(United States) Mirko Pehar	(United States) Scott Lipsky (United States) David Martin	4–6, 4–6
Win	3–4	Apr 2006	Santa Clara, United States	Challenger	Hard	(United States) Sam Warburg	(South Africa) Rik De Voest (United States) Glenn Weiner	7–5, 6–3
Loss	3–5	Apr 2007	Tallahassee, United States	Challenger	Hard	(United States) Mirko Pehar	(South Africa) Izak vanDerMerwe (South Africa) Wesley Whitehouse	3–6, 4–6
Win	4–5	May 2007	Fergana, Uzbekistan	Challenger	Hard	(Germany) Daniel Brands	(Czech Republic) Lukas Rosol (Austria) Martin Slanar	7–6^{(7–1)}, 7–5
Win	5–5	Jun 2007	Busan, South Korea	Challenger	Hard	(Ukraine) Sergei Bubka	(Australia) Nathan Healey (Czech Republic) Jan Mertl	4–6, 7–6^{(7–5)}, [10–6]
Loss	5–6	Jul 2007	Aptos, United States	Challenger	Hard	(Philippines) Cecil Mamiit	(United States) Rajeev Ram (United States) Bobby Reynolds	7–6^{(7–5)}, 3–6, [7–10]
Loss	5–7	Aug 2007	Jordao, Brazil	Challenger	Hard	(South Africa) Izak vanDerMerwe	(Argentina) Eduardo Schwank (Argentina) Horacio Zeballos	6–3, 3–6, [10–12]
Loss	5–8	Aug 2007	Manta, Ecuador	Challenger	Hard	(United States) Eric Nunez	(Argentina) Eduardo Schwank (Argentina) Horacio Zeballos	4–6, 2–6
Loss	5–9	Oct 2007	Sacramento, United States	Challenger	Hard	(United States) Sam Warburg	(United States) Robert Kendrick (United States) Brian Wilson	5–7, 6–7^{(8–10)}
Win	6–9	Aug 2009	Israel F4, Ramat Hasharon	Futures	Hard	(New Zealand) G.D. Jones	(France) Ludovic Walter (Israel) Amir Weintraub	6–2, 4–6, [10–5]
Win	7–9	Sep 2009	Israel F5, Ramat Hasharon	Futures	Hard	(New Zealand) G.D. Jones	(New Zealand) Marcus Daniell (Slovakia) Miloslav Mecir	3–6, 6–2, [10–4]
Loss	7–10	Sep 2009	Israel F6, Ramat Hasharon	Futures	Hard	(New Zealand) G.D. Jones	(New Zealand) Marcus Daniell (Israel) Amir Weintraub	1–6, 7–6^{(7–4)}, [5–10]
Win	8–10	Oct 2009	Nigeria F2, Lagos	Futures	Hard	(Romania) Catalin-Ionut Gard	(Togo) Komlavi Loglo (Republic of Ireland) Valentin Sanon	6–1, 7–6^{(7–3)}
Win	9–10	Nov 2009	Senegal F2, Dakar	Futures	Hard	(Belgium) Neils Desein	(United Kingdom) Philip Barlow (Germany) Tony Holzinger	6–3, 6–2
Loss	9–11	Jun 2010	USA F14, Davis	Futures	Hard	(Australia) Adam Hubble	(United States) Brett Joelson (United States) Nicholas Monroe	7–6^{(7–5)}, 2–6, [7–10]
Win	10–11	May 2011	Fergana, Uzbekistan	Challenger	Hard	(South Africa) Raven Klassen	(South Korea) Kyu-Tae Im (Thailand) Danai Udomchoke	6–0, 6–3
Win	11–11	May 2011	Israel F5, Ramat Hasharon	Futures	Hard	(Israel) Amir Weintraub	(United Kingdom) David Rice (United Kingdom) Sean Thornley	6–7^{(4–7)}, 7–6^{(7–3)}, [13–11]
Win	12–11	Jun 2011	Israel F6, Ashkelon	Futures	Hard	(Republic of Ireland) James Cluskey	(Israel) Noam Behr (Israel) Igor Smilansky	6–3, 6–0
Loss	12–12	Jul 2011	Aptos, United States	Challenger	Hard	(South Africa) Raven Klassen	(Australia) Carsten Ball (Australia) Chris Guccione	6–7^{(5–7)}, 4–6
Loss	12–13	Sep 2011	Tashkent, Uzbekistan	Challenger	Hard	(South Africa) Raven Klassen	(Finland) Harri Heliövaara (Ukraine) Denys Molchanov	6–7^{(5–7)}, 6–7^{(3–7)}
Loss	12–14	Nov 2011	Charlottesville, United States	Challenger	Hard	(South Africa) Raven Klassen	(Philippines) Treat Conrad Huey (United Kingdom) Dominic Inglot	6–4, 3–6, [7–10]
Loss	12–15	Feb 2012	Caloundra, Australia	Challenger	Hard	(South Africa) Raven Klassen	(Australia) John Peers (Australia) John-Patrick Smith	6–7^{(5–7)}, 4–6
Win	13–15	Mar 2012	Pingguo, China	Challenger	Hard	(South Africa) Raven Klassen	(Australia) Colin Ebelthite (Australia) Sam Groth	6–2, 6–4
Win	14–15	Apr 2012	Kaohsiung, Taiwan	Challenger	Hard	(South Africa) Raven Klassen	(New Zealand) Daniel King-Turner (Denmark) Frederik Nielsen	6–7^{(6–8)}, 7–5, [10–8]
Loss	14–16	Oct 2015	Bangalore, India	Challenger	Hard	(India) N. Vijay Sundar Prashanth	(India) Saketh Myneni (India) Sanam Singh	7–5, 4–6, [2–10]
Win	15–16	Jul 2016	Canada F4, Kelowna	Futures	Hard	(Chinese Taipei) Jason Jung	(Australia) Jarryd Chaplin (New Zealand) Ben Mclachlan	6–4, 7–6^{(7–4)}
Win	16–16	Aug 2016	Thailand F1, Hua Hin	Futures	Hard	(Chinese Taipei) Ti Chen	(South Korea) Yunseong Chung (China) Xin Gao	6–2, 6–2
Loss	16–17	Dec 2017	Mexico F7, Metepec	Futures	Hard	(United States) Thai-Son Kwiatkowski	(Ecuador) Gonzalo Escobar (Mexico) Manuel Sanchez	3–6, 3–6
Win	17–17	Feb 2018	Portugal F1, Lobo	Futures	Hard	(Portugal) Fred Gil	(Portugal) Francisco Cabral (Portugal) Francisco Dias	6–1, 6–0
Loss	17–18	Jun 2018	Tunisia F21, Jerba	Futures	Hard	(France) Albano Olivetti	(Tunisia) Anis Ghorbel (Bulgaria) Vasko Mladenov	3–6, 2–6
Loss	17–19	Jun 2018	Korea F2, Gyeongsan	Futures	Hard	(Japan) Tukuto Niki	(South Korea) Yongkyu Lim (South Korea) Ji Sung Nam	4–6, 1–6
Win	18–19	Jul 2018	Malaysia F2, Kuala Lumpur	Futures	Hard	(Spain) Diego Perez Sanz	(South Korea) Cheong-Eui Kim (South Korea) Sang-Woo Noh	6–4, 6–4
Loss	18–20	Jul 2018	Malaysia F3, Kuala Lumpur	Futures	Hard	(Philippines) Francis Casey Alcantara	(South Korea) Cheong-Eui Kim (South Korea) Sang-Woo Noh	1–6, 6–3, [5–10]
Loss	18–21	Oct 2018	USA F27, Houston	Futures	Hard	(Portugal) Bernardo Saraiva	(France) Maxime Cressy (United States) Nicolas Meister	5–7, 3–6
Loss	18–22	Oct 2018	USA F28, Harlingen	Futures	Hard	(United States) Ronnie Schneider	(France) Maxime Cressy (United States) Nicolas Meister	4–6, 2–6
Loss	18–23	Oct 2018	USA F28B, Waco	Futures	Hard	(United States) Danny Thomas	(France) Maxime Cressy (United States) Nicolas Meister	1–6, 4–6
