= Matthias Bachinger =

German tennis player (born 1987)

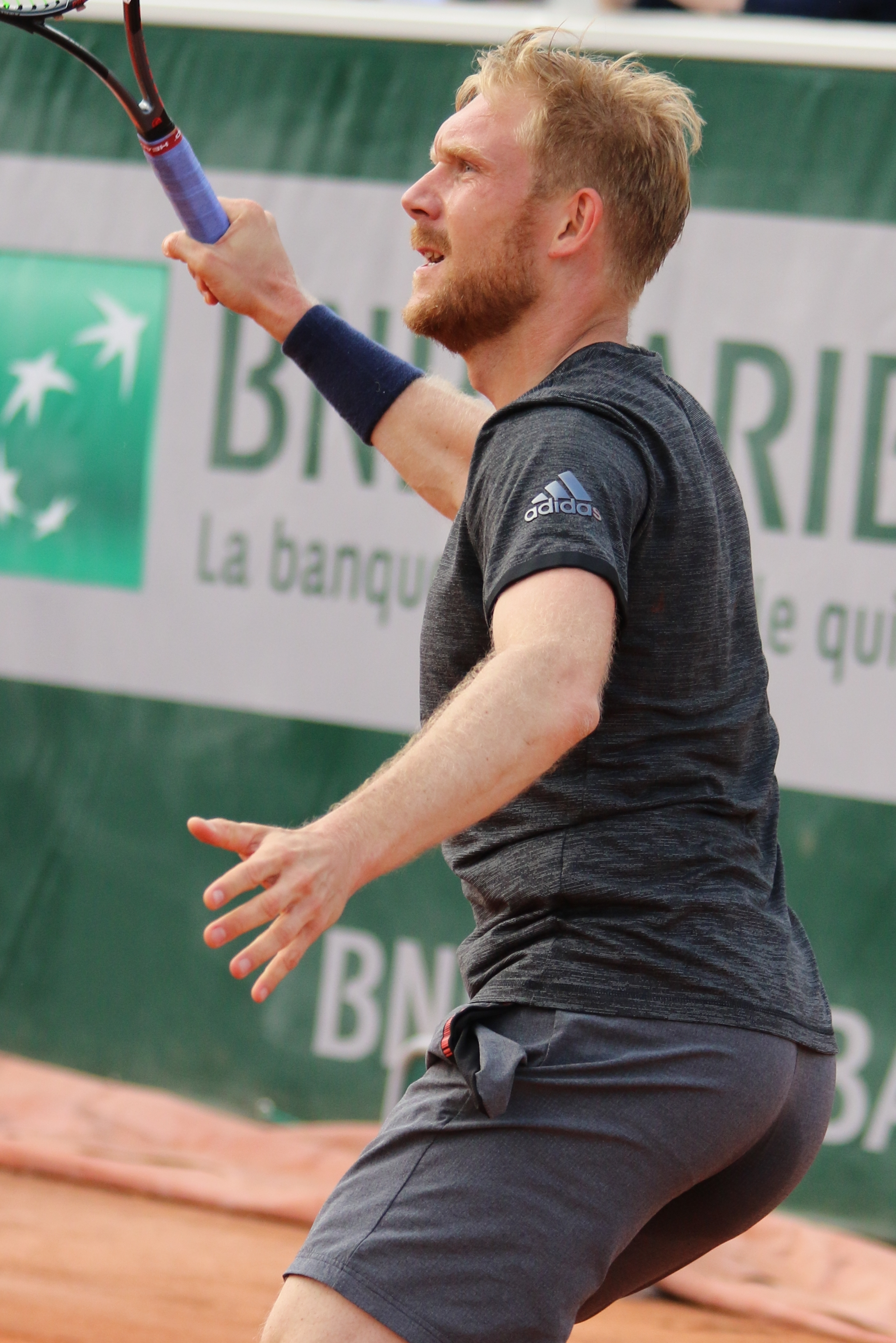
- Bachinger at the 2019 French Open Qualifying
- Country (sports): Germany
- Residence: Munich, Germany
- Born: 2 April 1987 (age 37); Munich, West Germany
- Height: 1.88 m (6 ft 2 in)
- Turned pro: 2005
- Retired: 2023
- Plays: Right-handed (two-handed backhand)
- Prize money: $1,703,120

Singles
- Career record: 31–55
- Career titles: 0
- Highest ranking: No. 85 (15 August 2011)

Grand Slam singles results
- Australian Open: 2R (2015)
- French Open: 1R (2015)
- Wimbledon: 1R (2011, 2012)
- US Open: 2R (2014)

Doubles
- Career record: 5–21
- Career titles: 0
- Highest ranking: No. 151 (31 October 2011)

Matthias Bachinger (born 2 April 1987) is a German former tennis player who played professionally from 2005 to 2023. His career-high singles ranking was world No. 85, achieved in August 2011.

== Professional career ==
In 2007, Bachinger qualified for his first ATP tournament, the 2007 BMW Open. Bachinger won in the first round against Andreas Beck 6–2, 7–6, 7–5 before losing to Marcos Baghdatis in the second round 6–7, 2–6, 4–6.

In 2008, Bachinger entered the ABN AMRO World Tennis Tournament, the BMW Open, the Austrian Open and the If Stockholm Open, losing in the first round in each event.

He then played only Challenger level tournaments before qualifying for the 2010 If Stockholm Open, where he reached the second round.

Bachinger reached his first ATP semifinal at the 2012 BRD Năstase Țiriac Trophy. He also reached the quarterfinals of Umag the same year, defeating seventh-seeded Martin Kližan en route.

In 2013, Bachinger defeated World No. 18 Andreas Seppi, for his first top 20 win.

In 2014, he recorded his first Major win as a qualifier at the 2014 US Open (tennis) defeating Radek Štěpánek. He also reached the semifinals in Stockholm as a qualifier.

In 2018, he reached his first ATP Tour final in Metz, again as a qualifier, after defeating Kei Nishikori in the semifinals, before losing to Gilles Simon.

In April 2023, Bachinger announced his retirement and played his last professional match at the BMW Open in his hometown Munich in the doubles competition with Dominic Thiem, where they lost in the first round.

== Playing style ==
Bachinger has an unusual take-back and swing on his forehand and backhand. He has solid groundstrokes, with both sides capable of producing winners. He has a good serve that can reach up to 127 mph (204 km/h). He is very strong at the net and frequently rushes to the net. He frequently serve-and-volleys and uses the chip-and-charge tactic on returns.

== Performance timelines ==
Key
W	F	SF	QF	#R	RR	Q#	DNQ	A	NH

(W) winner; (F) finalist; (SF) semifinalist; (QF) quarterfinalist; (#R) rounds 4, 3, 2, 1; (RR) round-robin stage; (Q#) qualification round; (DNQ) did not qualify; (A) absent; (NH) not held; (SR) strike rate (events won / competed); (W–L) win–loss record.
To avoid confusion and double counting, these charts are updated at the conclusion of a tournament or when the player's participation has ended.

=== Singles ===
Tournament	2005	2006	2007	2008	2009	2010	2011	2012	2013	2014	2015	2016	2017	2018	2019	2020	2021	2022	2023	SR	W–L
Grand Slam tournaments
Australian Open	A	A	A	Q1	Q3	Q2	Q2	1R	Q2	Q2	2R	A	Q2	1R	Q2	Q2	A	Q1	A	0 / 3	1–3
French Open	A	A	Q1	Q1	Q1	A	Q1	Q3	Q2	Q1	1R	Q1	A	Q1	Q2	A	Q1	A	A	0 / 1	0–1
Wimbledon	A	A	Q1	Q2	Q3	A	1R	1R	Q1	Q2	Q2	Q3	A	Q3	Q1	NH	A	A	A	0 / 2	0–2
US Open	A	A	A	Q1	Q1	A	1R	1R	Q2	2R	Q1	Q3	A	Q1	Q1	A	A	A	A	0 / 3	1–3
Win–loss	0–0	0–0	0–0	0–0	0–0	0–0	0–2	0–3	0–0	1–1	1–2	0–0	0–0	0–1	0–0	0–0	0–0	0–0	0–0	0 / 9	2–9
Career statistics
Tournaments	0	0	1	4	0	2	10	16	6	2	4	1	0	4	4	0	1	0	0	55	
Titles / Finals	0 / 0	0 / 0	0 / 0	0 / 0	0 / 0	0 / 0	0 / 0	0 / 0	0 / 0	0 / 0	0 / 0	0 / 0	0 / 0	0 / 1	0 / 0	0 / 0	0 / 0	0 / 0	0 / 0	0 / 1	
Overall win–loss	0–0	0–0	1–1	0–4	0–0	1–2	4–10	9–16	2–6	4–2	2–4	0–1	0–0	5–4	3–4	0–0	0–1	0–0	0–0	31–55	
Year-end ranking	648	332	173	225	239	187	94	123	159	141	222	493	180	130	223	278	234	815	912	36%	

=== Doubles ===
Tournament	2011	2012	2013	2014	2015	SR	W–L
Grand Slam tournaments
Australian Open	A	1R	A	A	A	0 / 1	0–1
French Open	A	1R	A	A	A	0 / 1	0–1
Wimbledon	2R	1R	Q1	A	Q1	0 / 2	1–2
US Open	1R	A	A	A	A	0 / 1	0–1
Win–loss	1–2	0–3	0–0	0–0	0–0	0 / 5	1–5
Career statistics
Titles / Finals	0 / 1	0 / 0	0 / 0	0 / 0	0 / 0	0 / 1	

== ATP career finals ==
=== Singles: 1 (1 runner-up) ===
Legend Grand Slam tournaments (0–0) ATP Finals (0–0) ATP Tour Masters 1000 (0–0) ATP Tour 500 Series (0–0) ATP Tour 250 Series (0–1)	Finals by surface Hard (0–1) Clay (0–0) Grass (0–0)

Result	W–L	Date	Tournament	Tier	Surface	Opponent	Score
Loss	0–1	Sep 2018	Moselle Open, France	250 Series	Hard (i)	(France) Gilles Simon	6–7^{(2–7)}, 1–6

=== Doubles: 1 (1 runner-up) ===
Legend Grand Slam tournaments (0–0) ATP Finals (0–0) ATP Tour Masters 1000 (0–0) ATP Tour 500 Series (0–0) ATP Tour 250 Series (0–1)	Finals by surface Hard (0–1) Clay (0–0) Grass (0–0)

Result	W–L	Date	Tournament	Tier	Surface	Partner	Opponents	Score
Loss	0–1	Jul 2011	Atlanta Open, United States	250 Series	Hard	(Germany) Frank Moser	(United States) Alex Bogomolov Jr. (Australia) Matthew Ebden	6–3, 5–7, [8–10]

== ATP Challenger and ITF Futures finals ==
=== Singles: 22 (6–16) ===
Legend ATP Challenger (4–11) ITF Futures/World Tennis Tour (2–5)	Finals by surface Hard (5–8) Clay (1–5) Grass (0–1) Carpet (0–2)

Result	W–L	Date	Tournament	Tier	Surface	Opponent	Score
Loss	0–1	Sep 2005	Germany F13, Nussloch	Futures	Clay	(Germany) Marcel Zimmermann	2–6, 1–6
Loss	0–2	Jul 2006	Austria F4, Anif	Futures	Clay	(Germany) Tobias Kamke	1–6, 6–7^{(7–9)}
Loss	0–3	Aug 2006	Germania F13, Munchen	Futures	Clay	(Czech Republic) Martin Vacek	4–6, 4–6
Win	1–3	Oct 2006	Spain F33, Córdoba	Futures	Hard	(Spain) Oscar Burrieza	6–2, 7–6^{(7–3)}
Win	1–0	Nov 2007	Louisville, US	Challenger	Hard (i)	(United States) Donald Young	0–6, 7–5, 6–3
Loss	1–1	Mar 2008	Kyoto, Japan	Challenger	Carpet (i)	(Japan) Go Soeda	6–7^{(0–7)}, 6–2, 4–6
Loss	1–2	Aug 2008	Freudenstadt, Germany	Challenger	Clay	(Germany) Simon Greul	3–6, 4–6
Loss	1–4	Aug 2010	Italy F21, Eppan	Futures	Clay	(Italy) Marco Crugnola	4–6, 6–3, 2–6
Win	2–2	Nov 2010	Loughborough, United Kingdom	Challenger	Hard (i)	(Denmark) Frederik Nielsen	6–3, 3–6, 6–1
Loss	2–3	Mar 2011	Pingguo, China	Challenger	Hard	(Japan) Go Soeda	4–6, 5–7
Win	3–3	Apr 2011	Athens, Greece	Challenger	Hard	(Russia) Dmitry Tursunov	walkover
Loss	3–4	Jun 2011	Nottingham, United Kingdom	Challenger	Grass	(Luxembourg) Gilles Müller	6–7^{(4–7)}, 2–6
Loss	3–5	Jul 2011	Granby, Canada	Challenger	Hard	(France) Édouard Roger-Vasselin	6–7^{(9–11)}, 6–4, 1–6
Loss	3–6	Nov 2011	Helsinki, Finland	Challenger	Hard (i)	(Germany) Daniel Brands	6–7^{(2–7)}, 6–7^{(5–7)}
Loss	3–7	Nov 2012	Geneva, Switzerland	Challenger	Hard (i)	(France) Marc Gicquel	6–3, 3–6, 4–6
Loss	3–8	Nov 2014	Ortisei, Italy	Challenger	Hard (i)	(Italy) Andreas Seppi	4–6, 3–6
Win	2–4	Aug 2017	Italy F24, Bolzano	Futures	Clay	(Italy) Andrea Basso	6–4, 6–2
Win	4–8	Sep 2017	Gwangju, South Korea	Challenger	Hard	(Chinese Taipei) Yang Tsung-hua	6–3, 6–4
Loss	4–9	Sep 2018	Manacor, Spain	Challenger	Hard	(Australia) Bernard Tomic	6–4, 3–6, 6–7^{(3–7)}
Loss	4–10	Mar 2021	Biella, Italy	Challenger	Hard (i)	(Germany) Daniel Masur	3–6, 7–6^{(10–8)}, 5–7
Loss	4–11	Dec 2021	Forli, Italy	Challenger	Hard (i)	(United States) Maxime Cressy	4–6, 2–6
Loss	2–5	Jan 2023	M25 Veigy-Foncenex, France	World Tour	Carpet (i)	(Austria) Neil Oberleitner	4–6, 2–6

=== Doubles: 9 (5–4) ===
ATP Challenger (4–3)
ITF Futures (1–1)

Result	W–L	Date	Tournament	Tier	Surface	Partner	Opponents	Score
Win	1–0	Sep 2005	Germany F13, Nussloch	Futures	Clay	(Germany) Philipp Piyamongkol	(Jamaica) Dustin Brown (Germany) Tobias Klein	6–4, 6–4
Loss	1–1	Jun 2006	Slovenia F1, Kranj	Futures	Clay	(Germany) Daniel Brands	(Italy) Mattia Livraghi (Italy) Matteo Volante	6–3, 6–7^{(5–7)}, 4–6
Loss	0–1	May 2008	Sanremo, Italy	Challenger	Clay	(Germany) Daniel Brands	(Israel) Harel Levy (United States) Jim Thomas	4–6, 4–6
Win	1–1	Jul 2009	Rimini, Italy	Challenger	Clay	(Germany) Dieter Kindlmann	(Italy) Leonardo Azzaro (Italy) Marco Crugnola	6–4, 6–2
Win	2–1	Jun 2010	Marburg, Germany	Challenger	Clay	(Germany) Denis Gremelmayr	(Spain) Guillermo Olaso (Slovenia) Grega Žemlja	6–4, 6–4
Win	3–1	Feb 2011	Wolfsburg, Germany	Challenger	Carpet (i)	(Germany) Simon Stadler	(Germany) Dominik Meffert (Denmark) Frederik Nielsen	3–6, 7–6^{(7–3)}, [10–7]
Loss	3–2	Apr 2011	Athens, Greece	Challenger	Hard	(Germany) Benjamin Becker	(United Kingdom) Colin Fleming (United States) Scott Lipsky	walkover
Loss	3–3	Jul 2011	Granby, Canada	Challenger	Hard	(Germany) Frank Moser	(Slovakia) Karol Beck (France) Édouard Roger-Vasselin	1–6, 3–6
Win	4–3	Aug 2014	Meerbusch, Germany	Challenger	Clay	(Germany) Dominik Meffert	(China) Gong Maoxin (Chinese Taipei) Peng Hsien-yin	6–3, 3–6, [10–6]

== Record against top-10 players ==
Bachinger's match record against players who have been ranked world No. 10 or higher is as follows. Only ATP Tour main draw are considered.

- (Czech Republic) Radek Štěpánek 1–0
- (Spain) Fernando Verdasco 1–0
- (Spain) Roberto Bautista Agut 1–1
- (Japan) Kei Nishikori 1–1
- (United States) James Blake 0–1
- (Belgium) David Goffin 0–1
- (France) Gaël Monfils 0–1
- (United Kingdom) Andy Murray 0–1
- (Norway) Casper Ruud 0–1
- (Russia) Mikhail Youzhny 0–1
- (Czechoslovakia) Tomáš Berdych 0–2
- (Croatia) Marin Čilić 0–2
- (France) Gilles Simon 0–3
- (Cyprus) Marcos Baghdatis 0–4

* As of 17 April 2023.
