= Nikos Rovas =

Greek tennis player

- Country (sports): Greece
- Born: 20 September 1977 (age 47)
- Prize money: $40,600

Singles
- Career titles: 0–1 (ATP Tour)
- Highest ranking: No. 429 (10 February 2003)

Grand Slam singles results
- Australian Open: Q1 (2003)

Doubles
- Highest ranking: No. 380 (28 October 2002)

Nikos Rovas (born 20 September 1977) is a Greek former professional tennis player.

Rovas, who had a career high ranking of 429 in the world, spent his career mostly on the ITF Futures Circuit. He made the occasional appearance in Challenger events and played in the main draw of the 1998 Romanian Open, an ATP Tour tournament. In 2003 he featured in the qualifiers at the Australian Open.

A regular member of the Greece Davis Cup team between 1996 and 2006, Rovas competed for his country in a total of 17 ties, winning six singles and three doubles rubbers. He also represented Greece at the 2001 Mediterranean Games.
