= Green World ATP Challenger =

Tournament information
- Location: Pingguo, China
- Category: ATP Challenger Tour
- Surface: Hard
- Draw: 32S/7Q/16D
- Prize money: €42,500+H

The Green World ATP Challenger was a tennis tournament held in Pingguo, China in 2011 and in 2012. The event was part of the ATP Challenger Tour and was played on hardcourts.

== Past finals ==
=== Singles ===
Year	Champion	Runner-up	Score
2012	(Japan) Go Soeda	(Tunisia) Malek Jaziri	6–1, 3–6, 7–5
2011	(Japan) Go Soeda	(Germany) Matthias Bachinger	6–4, 7–5

=== Doubles ===
Year	Champions	Runners-up	Score
2012	(United States) John Paul Fruttero (South Africa) Raven Klaasen	(Australia) Colin Ebelthite (Australia) Samuel Groth	6–4, 6–2
2011	(Russia) Michail Elgin (Russia) Alexander Kudryavtsev	(Finland) Harri Heliövaara (New Zealand) Jose Rubin Statham	6–3, 6–2
