= Status Athens Open =

Defunct tennis tournament
- Event name: Athens
- Founded: 2008
- Abolished: 2011
- Editions: 14
- Location: Athens, Greece
- Venue: Athens Olympic Tennis Centre
- Category: ATP Challenger Tour
- Surface: Hard
- Draw: 32S/32Q/16D
- Website: Website

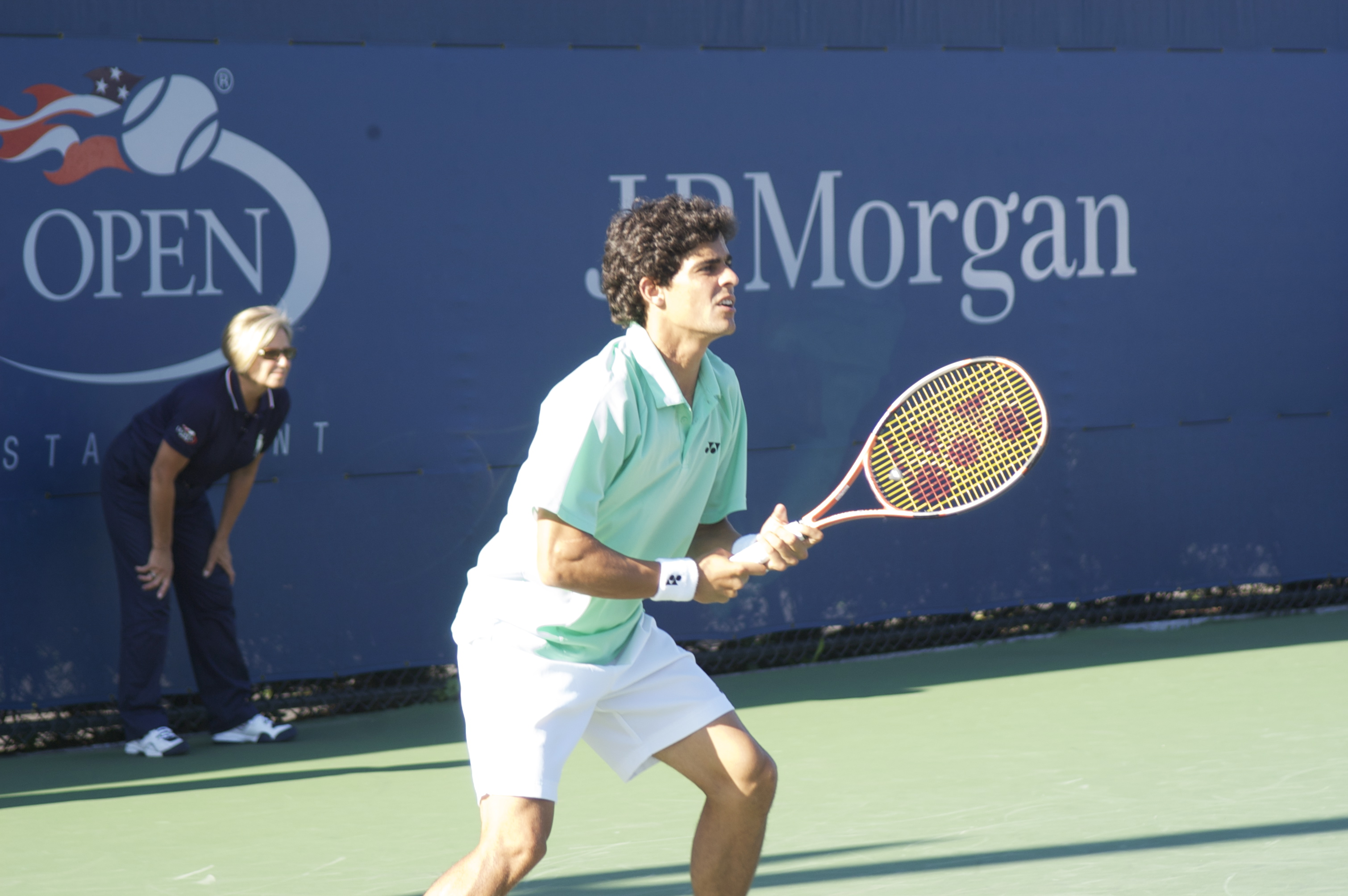
Portugal's Rui Machado took the singles title in 2009

The Status Athens Open was a professional tennis tournament played on outdoor hardcourts. It was part of the Association of Tennis Professionals (ATP) Challenger Tour. It was held annually in Athens, Greece, from 2008 until 2011.

Lu Yen-hsun was the only player to win both singles and doubles title in the same year.

== Past finals ==
=== Singles ===
Year	Champion	Runner-up	Score
2011	(Germany) Matthias Bachinger	(Russia) Dmitry Tursunov	walkover
2010	(Chinese Taipei) Lu Yen-hsun	(Germany) Rainer Schüttler	3–6, 7–6(4), 6–4
2009	(Portugal) Rui Machado	(Spain) Daniel Muñoz de la Nava	6–3, 7–6(4)
2008	(Netherlands) Martin Verkerk	(Romania) Adrian Cruciat	6–3, 6–3

=== Doubles ===
Year	Champions	Runners-up	Score
2012	(Germany) Andre Begemann (Australia) Jordan Kerr	(Spain) Gerard Granollers (Greece) Alexandros Jakupovic	6–2, 6–3
2011	(United Kingdom) Colin Fleming (United States) Scott Lipsky	(Germany) Matthias Bachinger (Germany) Benjamin Becker	walkover
2010	(South Africa) Rik de Voest (Chinese Taipei) Lu Yen-hsun	(Netherlands) Robin Haase (Netherlands) Igor Sijsling	6–3, 6–4
2009	(Australia) Rameez Junaid (Germany) Philipp Marx	(Netherlands) Jesse Huta Galung (Portugal) Rui Machado	6–4, 6–3
2008	(Spain) Marc López (Spain) Gabriel Trujillo Soler	(Greece) Konstantinos Economidis (Greece) Alex Jakupovic	6–4, 6–4
