= Konstantinos Economidis =

Greek tennis player (born 1977)

Konstantinos Economidis Κωνσταντίνος Οικονομίδης
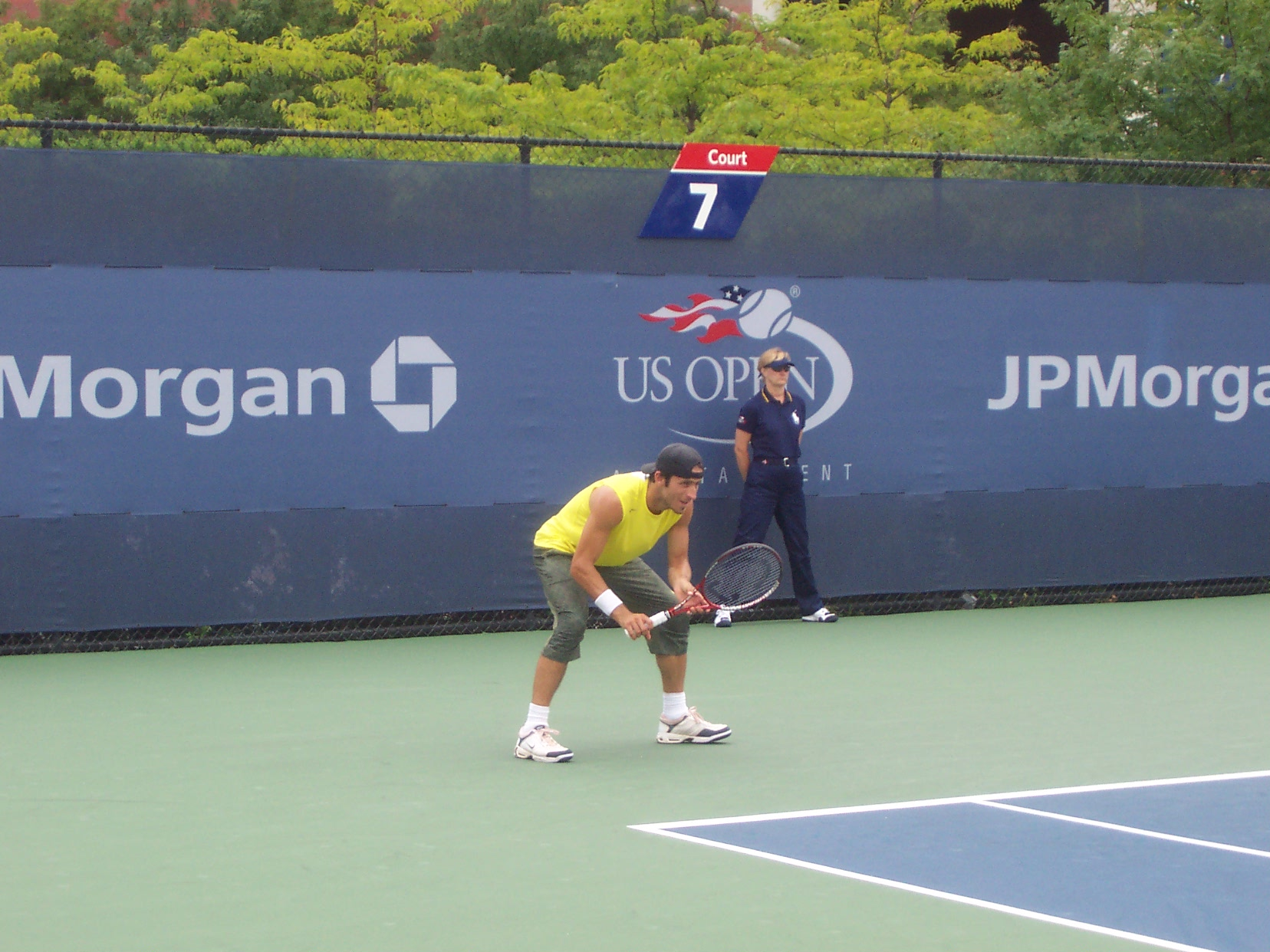
- Country (sports): Greece
- Residence: Thessaloniki, Greece
- Born: 2 November 1977 (age 48) Thessaloniki, Greece
- Height: 1.88 m (6 ft 2 in)
- Turned pro: 1998
- Retired: 2016
- Plays: Right-handed (one-handed backhand)
- Prize money: $405,520

Singles
- Career record: 19–18
- Career titles: 0; 5 Challenger, 18 Futures
- Highest ranking: No. 112 (5 February 2007)

Grand Slam singles results
- Australian Open: 1R (2008)
- French Open: 2R (2007)
- Wimbledon: 1R (2002, 2003)
- US Open: Q2 (2002, 2004)

Other tournaments
- Olympic Games: 1R (2004)

Doubles
- Career record: 12–11
- Career titles: 0; 5 Challenger, 9 Futures
- Highest ranking: No. 152 (23 April 2007)

Grand Slam doubles results
- Australian Open: 2R (2007)
- Wimbledon: Q2 (2007)
Medal record
Mediterranean Games
Gold medal – first place	2001 Tunis	Singles
Gold medal – first place	2001 Tunis	Doubles
- Last updated on: 23 February 2026.

Konstantinos Economidis (Greek: Κωνσταντίνος Οικονομίδης, born 2 November 1977) is a retired professional Greek tennis player and a former Greek No. 1. In 2007, he qualified for the French Open and defeated Australian Chris Guccione in the first round before losing to Tommy Robredo in the second round. He achieved his career-high singles ranking of world No. 112 in February 2007 and has won 5 Challenger titles.

Despite playing relatively few ATP Tour-level matches, Economidis has impressively managed to post a positive record in both singles and doubles.

== ATP Challenger and ITF Futures finals ==
=== Singles: 29 (23–6) ===
Legend ATP Challenger (5–1) ITF Futures (18–5)	Finals by surface Hard (11–5) Clay (11–1) Grass (0–0) Carpet (1–0)

Result	W–L	Date	Tournament	Tier	Surface	Opponent	Score
Win	1–0	Jul 1999	Greece F4, Alexandroupolis	Futures	Carpet	(France) Cyril Saulnier	6–4, 4–6, 6–4
Win	2–0	Jul 2000	Greece F2, Nafplion	Futures	Hard	(Spain) Ferran Ventura-Martell	6–4, 6–0
Win	3–0	Jul 2000	Greece F3, Ioannina	Futures	Hard	(India) Srinath Prahlad	6–2, 6–2
Win	4–0	Oct 2000	Greece F6, Kos	Futures	Hard	(Croatia) Ivan Vajda	4–6, 6–4, 6–4
Loss	4–1	Nov 2000	Greece F7, Heraklion	Futures	Hard	(Germany) Florian Jeschonek	5–7, 6–3, 4–6
Loss	4–2	Jun 2001	Greece F3, Syros	Futures	Hard	(Slovenia) Marko Tkalec	3–6, 7–6^{(7–2)}, 6–7^{(5–7)}
Win	5–2	Jul 2001	Romania F1, Bucharest	Futures	Clay	(Romania) Victor Hănescu	6–7^{(2–7)}, 6–2, 6–1
Win	6–2	Oct 2001	Barcelona, Spain	Challenger	Clay	(France) Nicolas Coutelot	7–6^{(7–4)}, 6–1
Win	7–2	May 2002	Jamaica F4, Montego Bay	Futures	Hard	(Chile) Felipe Parada	6–4, 6–4
Win	8–2	May 2002	Jamaica F6, Montego Bay	Futures	Hard	(Greece) Nikos Rovas	6–4, 7–6^{(7–5)}
Loss	8–3	Oct 2002	Greece F3, Thessaloniki	Futures	Hard	(Germany) Dieter Kindlmann	walkover
Win	9–3	Mar 2003	Portugal F5, Faro	Futures	Hard	(Spain) Guillermo García López	6–4, 6–1
Win	10–3	Oct 2003	Greece F3, Athens	Futures	Clay	(Greece) Theodoros Angelinos	6–0, 6–4
Win	11–3	Oct 2003	Greece F4, Thessaloniki	Futures	Clay	(Bulgaria) Ilia Kushev	2–6, 6–4, 6–1
Loss	11–4	Oct 2003	Cyprus F1, Nicosia	Futures	Clay	(Cyprus) Marcos Baghdatis	6–7^{(5–7)}, 1–6
Win	12–4	Nov 2003	Spain F28, Gran Canaria	Futures	Clay	(Spain) Iván Navarro	6–1, 3–6, 6–2
Win	13–4	Oct 2004	Thailand F1, Bangkok	Futures	Hard	(France) Guillaume Legat	6–2, 6–4
Loss	13–5	Apr 2005	Greece F1, Kalamata	Futures	Hard	(Bulgaria) Todor Enev	3–6, 2–6
Win	14–5	Apr 2005	Greece F2, Syros	Futures	Hard	(Bulgaria) Todor Enev	6–3, 6–1
Win	15–5	Feb 2006	Burnie, Australia	Challenger	Hard	(Australia) Alun Jones	6–4, 6–2
Win	16–5	Mar 2006	New Zealand F1, Blenheim	Futures	Hard	(United States) Scott Lipsky	6–0, 6–7^{(9–11)}, 6–2
Win	17–5	Mar 2006	New Zealand F2, Hamilton	Futures	Hard	(United Kingdom) Jamie Baker	6–4, 6–0
Win	18–5	Mar 2006	Australia F3, Lyneham	Futures	Clay	(Argentina) Damian Patriarca	6–1, 6–4
Win	19–5	Mar 2006	Australia F4, Bairnsdale	Futures	Clay	(Australia) Adam Feeney	6–3, 6–2
Win	20–5	Apr 2006	Australia F5, Sale	Futures	Clay	(Czech Republic) Radim Žitko	6–2, 6–1
Win	21–5	Jul 2006	Constanţa, Romania	Challenger	Clay	(Romania) Adrian Ungur	6–4, 6–4
Win	22–5	Aug 2006	Cordenons, Italy	Challenger	Clay	(France) Mathieu Montcourt	6–3, 6–2
Win	23–5	Sep 2007	Banja Luka, Bosnia & Herzegovina	Challenger	Clay	(Spain) Iván Navarro	7–6^{(8–6)}, 6–4
Loss	23–6	Oct 2007	Seoul, South Korea	Challenger	Hard	(Israel) Dudi Sela	4–6, 4–6

=== Doubles: 24 (14–10) ===
Legend ATP Challenger (5–2) ITF Futures (9–8)	Finals by surface Hard (8–3) Clay (5–6) Grass (0–0) Carpet (1–1)

Result	W–L	Date	Tournament	Tier	Surface	Partner	Opponents	Score
Loss	0–1	Jun 1998	Greece F5, Athens	Futures	Clay	(Greece) Nikos Rovas	(Israel) Lior Mor (Belgium) Wim Neefs	5–7, 3–6
Loss	0–2	May 1999	Greece F3, Eoannina	Futures	Hard	(Greece) Nikos Rovas	(Germany) Jan-Ralph Brandt (Germany) Markus Menzler	2–6, 2–6
Loss	0–3	Aug 2000	Hungary F6, Budapest	Futures	Clay	(Greece) Anastasios Vasiliadis	(Czech Republic) Igor Brukner (Slovakia) Martin Hromec	4–6, 4–6
Win	1–3	May 2002	Jamaica F4, Montego Bay	Futures	Hard	(Greece) Nikos Rovas	(United Kingdom) Jonathan Marray (United Kingdom) David Sherwood	6–4, 6–2
Loss	1–4	Apr 2003	Greece F2, Kalamata	Futures	Hard	(Greece) Nikos Rovas	(Romania) Florin Mergea (Romania) Horia Tecau	4–6, 6–1, 3–6
Loss	1–5	Oct 2003	Greece F3, Kalamata	Futures	Clay	(Greece) Theodoros Angelinos	(Germany) Christian Grunes (Netherlands) Melle Van Gemerden	6–4, 3–6, 6–7^{(1–7)}
Loss	1–6	Oct 2003	Greece F4, Thessaloniki	Futures	Clay	(Greece) Theodoros Angelinos	(Greece) Eleftherios- Spyridon Alexiou (Greece) Alexandros Jakoubovits	walkover
Win	2–6	Oct 2004	Thailand F1, Bangkok	Futures	Hard	(Greece) Nikos Rovas	(Japan) Joji Miyao (Japan) Atsuo Ogawa	6–4, 6–2
Win	3–6	Mar 2005	Italy F4, Caltanissetta	Futures	Clay	(Greece) Alexandros Jakoubovits	(Spain) Pablo Andujar (Italy) Matteo Volante	6–2, 3–6, 7–6^{(7–4)}
Win	4–6	Apr 2005	Greece F2, Syros	Futures	Hard	(Greece) Alexandros Jakoubovits	(Spain) Daniel Monedero-Gonzalez (Spain) Carlos Poch-Gradin	4–6, 7–6^{(7–2)}, 6–2
Win	5–6	Oct 2005	Rome, Italy	Challenger	Clay	(Greece) Vasilis Mazarakis	(Italy) Flavio Cipolla (Italy) Alessandro Motti	6–4, 7–6^{(7–4)}
Win	6–6	May 2006	Rome, Italy	Challenger	Clay	(Israel) Amir Hadad	(Italy) Manuel Jorquera (Italy) Giancarlo Petrazzuolo	6–4, 4–6, [10–5]
Win	7–6	Jul 2006	Constanţa, Romania	Challenger	Clay	(Netherlands) Jean-Julien Rojer	(Romania) Florin Mergea (Romania) Horia Tecau	7–6^{(7–1)}, 6–1
Loss	7–7	Aug 2006	Geneva, Switzerland	Challenger	Clay	(Croatia) Lovro Zovko	(Czech Republic) Michal Navratil (Kazakhstan) Yuriy Schukin	6–1, 2–6, [6–10]
Win	8–7	Mar 2007	Sunrise, United States	Challenger	Hard	(Belgium) Kristof Vliegen	(Argentina) Juan Martin del Potro (Argentina) Sebastian Prieto	6–3, 6–4
Win	9–7	Feb 2008	Belgrade, Serbia	Challenger	Carpet	(Italy) Flavio Cipolla	(Italy) Alessandro Motti (Slovakia) Filip Polasek	4–6, 6–2, [10–8]
Loss	9–8	Apr 2008	Athens, Greece	Challenger	Clay	(Greece) Alexandros Jakoubovits	(Spain) Marc López (Spain) Gabriel Trujillo Soler	4–6, 4–6
Loss	9–9	Oct 2010	Greece F2, Paros	Futures	Carpet	(Greece) Alexandros Jakoubovits	(Hungary) Kornel Bardoczky (Hungary) Adam Kellner	2–6, 4–6
Win	10–9	Jun 2013	Greece F9, Thessaloniki	Futures	Clay	(Greece) Alexandros Jakoubovits	(Barbados) Darian King (Germany) Dominik Schulz	6–1, 6–2
Win	11–9	Nov 2015	Greece F10, Heraklion	Futures	Hard	(Greece) Stefanos Tsitsipas	(Bulgaria) Aleksandar Lazov (Czech Republic) Dominik Suc	6–2, 6–2
Loss	11–10	Nov 2015	Greece F11, Heraklion	Futures	Hard	(Greece) Stefanos Tsitsipas	(United States) Alexander Centenari (Germany) Sami Reinwein	walkover
Win	12–10	Dec 2015	Cyprus F3, Larnaca	Futures	Hard	(Greece) Markos Kalovelonis	(Canada) Steven Diez (Spain) Andres Artunedo Martinavarro	4–6, 6–3, [10–5]
Win	13–10	Apr 2016	Greece F2, Heraklion	Futures	Hard	(Greece) Stefanos Tsitsipas	(Czech Republic) Petr Michnev (Czech Republic) Vaclav Safranek	4–6, 7–6^{(8–6)}, [10–5]
Win	14–10	May 2016	Greece F6, Heraklion	Futures	Hard	(Greece) Stefanos Tsitsipas	(United States) Christopher Ephron (Brazil) Bruno Savi	7–6^{(7–5)}, 6–7^{(6–8)}, [13–11]

1997-2008 AO - Q1 (97, 02), Q2 (00, 05), Q3 (03, 04, 07), 1R (08) FO - Q1 (06), Q2 (04. 08), 2R (07) WC - Q1(07), Q2 (06), 1R (02, 03) UO - Q1 (07), Q2 (02, 04)

Olympics - 1R (04) Indian Wells - Q1 (08), Q2 (07) Miami - Q1 (07, 08)

== Grand Slam performance timeline ==
Key
W	F	SF	QF	#R	RR	Q#	DNQ	A	NH

(W) winner; (F) finalist; (SF) semifinalist; (QF) quarterfinalist; (#R) rounds 4, 3, 2, 1; (RR) round-robin stage; (Q#) qualification round; (DNQ) did not qualify; (A) absent; (NH) not held; (SR) strike rate (events won / competed); (W–L) win–loss record.

Tournament	1998	1999	2000	2001	2002	2003	2004	2005	2006	2007	2008	2009-16	Career SR	Career W–L
Grand Slam tournaments
Australian Open	A	A	Q2	A	Q1	Q3	Q3	Q2	A	Q3	1R	A	0 / 1	0–1
French Open	A	A	A	A	A	A	Q2	A	Q1	2R	Q2	A	0 / 1	1–1
Wimbledon	A	A	A	A	1R	1R	A	A	Q2	Q1	A	A	0 / 2	0–2
U.S. Open	A	A	A	A	Q2	A	Q2	A	A	Q1	A	A	0 / 0	0–0
