= Alexandros Jakupovic =

Greek tennis player (born 1981)

Alexandros Jakupović
- Country (sports): Greece
- Born: 14 December 1981 (age 44) Paris, France
- Plays: Right-handed
- Prize money: $116,707

Singles
- Career record: 5–13
- Career titles: 0; 0 Challengers, 3 Futures
- Highest ranking: No. 464 (9 March 2009)

Doubles
- Career record: 3–9
- Career titles: 0; 0 Challengers, 32 Futures
- Highest ranking: No. 267 (17 November 2008)

Alexandros Jakupović (Greek: Αλέξανδρος Γιακούποβιτς, romanized: Aléxandros Giakoupovits, pronounced [ʝakuːpovit͡s], Bosnian: Аleksandros Jakupović, pronounced [jakǔːpoʋitɕ]; born 14 December 1981) is a Greek former tennis player who was banned for life in November 2015 by the Tennis Integrity Unit.

He is the son of a Bosniak father and a Greek mother.

== Career ==
His career high ATP singles rank is 464, which he achieved on 9 March 2009. As of 4 November 2013, on the futures level in singles, he has 37 quarter-final losses, 21 semi-final losses, 8 runners-up and 3 titles. As for doubles on the futures level, he has been far more successful. He has 31 semifinal exits, 31 runners-up and 23 titles. On the challenger level in doubles, he has 2 semi-finals, in July 2008 in Rimini, Italy, with Spaniard, Adrián Menéndez-Maceiras and in April 2009 in Athens, Greece with fellow Greek Konstantinos Economidis. He has 2 challenger doubles finals in April 2008 in Athens, Greece with his compatriot, Konstantinos Economidis and in May 2012 in Athens, Greece with Spaniard Gerard Granollers-Pujol. His doubles highest career rank was 267, which he achieved on 17 November 2008. As of 4 November 2013, he was ranked 480 in singles and 533 in doubles. He also played an important role in the Greece Davis Cup team.

He was banned from the sport for life on 12 November 2015 after having been found guilty of five corruption charges.
