= 2009 Volkswagen Challenger – Doubles =

Doubles
- 2009 Volkswagen Challenger

Final
- Champions: (United States) Travis Rettenmaier (United Kingdom) Ken Skupski
- Runners-up: (Ukraine) Sergei Bubka (Russia) Alexander Kudryavtsev
- Score: 6–3, 6–4

Events
Singles	Doubles
← 2008 ·	Volkswagen Challenger	· 2011 →

Carsten Ball and Izak van der Merwe were the defending champions but chose not to defend their title.

Travis Rettenmaier and Ken Skupski won the title after defeating Sergei Bubka and Alexander Kudryavtsev 6–3, 6–4 in the final.

== Seeds ==
1. (Ukraine) Sergei Bubka / (Russia) Alexander Kudryavtsev (final)
2. (United States) Brian Battistone / (India) Harsh Mankad (first round)
3. (Austria) Martin Fischer / (Brazil) Márcio Torres (first round)
4. (United States) Travis Rettenmaier / (United Kingdom) Ken Skupski (champions)

== Draw ==
=== Key ===
- Q = Qualifier
- WC = Wild card
- LL = Lucky loser
- Alt = Alternate
- SE = Special exempt
- PR = Protected ranking
- ITF = ITF entry
- JE = Junior exempt
- w/o = Walkover
- r = Retired
- d = Defaulted
- SR = Special ranking

First round
1	(Ukraine) S Bubka (Russia) A Kudryavtsev	6	2	[10]
WC	(Germany) F Mayer (Germany) Marc Meigel	3	6	[8]
(United Kingdom) A Bogdanovic (Poland) D Olejniczak	6	1	[4]
(Jamaica) D Brown (Italy) Fabio Colangelo	4	6	[10]
3	(Austria) M Fischer (Brazil) M Torres	7^{7}	4	[7]
(Poland) T Bednarek (Czech Republic) L Rosol	6^{1}	6	[10]
(Romania) A Cruciat (Latvia) A Juška	w/o
WC	(Germany) J-F Brunken (Germany) Marko Lenz
(United Kingdom) J Delgado (United Kingdom) J Marray	6	6
(India) R Gajjar (India) P Raja	3	2
(Italy) S Galvani (Russia) D Matsukevich	4	0
4	(United States) T Rettenmaier (United Kingdom) K Skupski	6	6
WC	(Germany) Jasper Hartwig (Germany) Kilian Symalla	w/o
(Austria) M Slanar (Germany) S Stadler
(Serbia) I Bozoljac (United States) S Jenkins	6	6
2	(United States) B Battistone (India) H Mankad	4	4

Quarterfinals
1	(Ukraine) S Bubka (Russia) A Kudryavtsev	7^{7}	6
(Jamaica) D Brown (Italy) F Colangelo	6^{1}	4
(Poland) T Bednarek (Czech Republic) L Rosol	7^{7}	6
(Romania) A Cruciat (Latvia) A Juška	6^{4}	4
(United Kingdom) J Delgado (United Kingdom) J Marray	6^{2}	4
4	(United States) T Rettenmaier (United Kingdom) K Skupski	7^{7}	6
WC	(Germany) J Hartwig (Germany) K Symalla	0	0
(Serbia) I Bozoljac (United States) S Jenkins	6	6

Semifinals
1	(Ukraine) S Bubka (Russia) A Kudryavtsev	6	6
(Poland) T Bednarek (Czech Republic) L Rosol	4	4
4	(United States) T Rettenmaier (United Kingdom) K Skupski	6	6
(Serbia) I Bozoljac (United States) S Jenkins	1	2

Final
1	(Ukraine) S Bubka (Russia) A Kudryavtsev	3	4
4	(United States) T Rettenmaier (United Kingdom) K Skupski	6	6
