= 2011 Volkswagen Challenger – Singles =

Singles
- 2011 Volkswagen Challenger

Final
- Champion: (Belgium) Ruben Bemelmans
- Runner-up: (Germany) Dominik Meffert
- Score: 6–7^{(8–10)}, 6–4, 6–4

Events
Singles	Doubles
← 2010 ·	Volkswagen Challenger	· 2012 →

Ruben Bemelmans was the defending champion from the last edition of the tournament in 2009. He successfully defended his title, defeating Dominik Meffert 6–7^{(8–10)}, 6–4, 6–4 in the final.

== Seeds ==
1. (Germany) Daniel Brands (first round)
2. (Luxembourg) Gilles Müller (first round)
3. (Belgium) Olivier Rochus (first round)
4. (Netherlands) Jesse Huta Galung (second round, withdrew)
5. (Belgium) Steve Darcis (second round)
6. (Germany) Andreas Beck (second round)
7. (Russia) Alexandre Kudryavtsev (first round, retired)
8. (Serbia) Ilija Bozoljac (semifinals)

== Draw ==
=== Key ===
- Q = Qualifier
- WC = Wild card
- LL = Lucky loser
- Alt = Alternate
- ITF = ITF entry
- PR = Protected ranking
- SR = Special ranking
- SE = Special exempt
- JE = Junior exempt
- JR = Junior Accelerator Programme entrant
- CO = College Accelerator Programme entrant
- NG = Next Gen Accelerator Program entrant
- w/o = Walkover
- r = Retired
- d = Defaulted

=== Finals ===
Semifinals
Q	(Germany) Stefan Seifert	6^{6}	7	3
(Belgium) Ruben Bemelmans	7	6^{5}	6
(Germany) Dominik Meffert	7	6
8	(Serbia) Ilija Bozoljac	6^{5}	3

Final
(Belgium) Ruben Bemelmans	6^{8}	6	6
(Germany) Dominik Meffert	7	4	4

=== Top half ===
First round
1	(Germany) D Brands	4	2
(Spain) R Bautista-Agut	6	6
(Germany) S Stadler	4	6^{3}
(Belarus) U Ignatik	6	7
Q	(Germany) Stefan Seifert	6	6
(France) Charles-Antoine Brézac	2	1
WC	(Russia) V Baluda	3	3
6	(Germany) A Beck	6	6
3	(Belgium) O Rochus	4	6	6^{4}
(Poland) J Janowicz	6	2	7
(Germany) S Rieschick	6	6
WC	(Germany) J-F Brunken	2	1
(Belgium) R Bemelmans	2	6	6
(Slovakia) M Semjan	6	4	2
WC	(Germany) P Gojowczyk	2	1
5	(Belgium) S Darcis	6	6

Second round
(Spain) R Bautista-Agut	7	4	4
(Belarus) U Ignatik	5	6	6
Q	(Germany) Stefan Seifert	2	6	6
6	(Germany) A Beck	6	1	3
(Poland) J Janowicz	6^{5}	0
(Germany) S Rieschick	7	6
(Belgium) R Bemelmans	7	3	6
5	(Belgium) S Darcis	6^{2}	6	3

Quarterfinals
(Belarus) U Ignatik	6^{5}	4
Q	(Germany) Stefan Seifert	7	6
(Germany) S Rieschick	3	4
(Belgium) R Bemelmans	6	6

Semifinals
Q	(Germany) Stefan Seifert	6^{6}	7	3
(Belgium) R Bemelmans	7	6^{5}	6

=== Bottom half ===
First round
7	(Russia) A Kudryavtsev	1	r
Q	(Germany) D Kindlmann	4
(Denmark) F Nielsen	4	2
Q	(Uzbekistan) F Dustov	6	6
(Germany) D Meffert	7	6
WC	(Chinese Taipei) Y-t Wang	5	2
(Belgium) K Vliegen	1	7	3
4	(Netherlands) J Huta Galung	6	6^{4}	6
8	(Serbia) I Bozoljac	6	6
(Netherlands) M Middelkoop	2	3
(Russia) K Kravchuk	6	6
Q	(Germany) A Begemann	3	3
(Estonia) J Zopp	1
(Australia) B Klein	0^{r}
(Germany) M Bachinger	6^{5}	6	6
2	(Luxembourg) G Müller	7	3	4

Second round
Q	(Germany) D Kindlmann	1	6	7
Q	(Uzbekistan) F Dustov	6	2	5
(Germany) D Meffert	w/o
4	(Netherlands) J Huta Galung
8	(Serbia) I Bozoljac	6	7
(Russia) K Kravchuk	3	5
(Estonia) J Zopp	2	7	5
(Germany) M Bachinger	6	5	7

Quarterfinals
Q	(Germany) D Kindlmann	5	4
(Germany) D Meffert	7	6
8	(Serbia) I Bozoljac	6	6
(Germany) M Bachinger	4	1

Semifinals
(Germany) D Meffert	7	6
8	(Serbia) I Bozoljac	6^{5}	3
