= 2012 Volkswagen Challenger =

Tennis tournament

- Date: 20–26 February
- Edition: 19th
- Location: Wolfsburg, Germany

Champions

Singles
- (Netherlands) Igor Sijsling

Doubles
- (Lithuania) Laurynas Grigelis / (Belarus) Uladzimir Ignatik
← 2011 ·	Volkswagen Challenger

The 2012 Volkswagen Challenger was a professional tennis tournament played on carpet courts. It was the 19th edition of the tournament which was part of the 2012 ATP Challenger Tour. It took place in Wolfsburg, Germany between 20 and 26 February 2012.

== Singles main-draw entrants ==
=== Seeds ===
Country	Player	Rank^{1}	Seed
NED	Thomas Schoorel	139	1
NED	Igor Sijsling	151	2
RUS	Alexander Kudryavtsev	163	3
CAN	Frank Dancevic	175	4
GER	Dominik Meffert	177	5
RUS	Konstantin Kravchuk	194	6
BIH	Amer Delić	195	7
BEL	Maxime Authom	198	8

- ^{1} Rankings are as of February 13, 2012.

=== Others ===
The following players received wildcards into the singles main draw:

- (Germany) Richard Becker
- (Serbia) Ilija Bozoljac
- (Germany) Nils Langer
- (Germany) Sebastian Rieschick

The following players received entry from the qualifying draw:

- (Russia) Evgeny Korolev
- (Slovakia) Andrej Martin
- (Italy) Luca Vanni
- (Germany) Marcel Zimmermann

== Champions ==
=== Singles ===
(Netherlands) Igor Sijsling def. (Poland) Jerzy Janowicz, 4–6, 6–3, 7–6^{(11–9)}

=== Doubles ===
(Lithuania) Laurynas Grigelis / (Belarus) Uladzimir Ignatik def. (Poland) Tomasz Bednarek / (France) Olivier Charroin, 7–5, 4–6, [10–5]
