= 2009 Royal Bank of Scotland Challenger =

- Date: 12–18 October
- Edition: 3rd
- Surface: Hard
- Location: Tiburon, California, United States

Champions

Singles
- (Japan) Go Soeda

Doubles
- (Philippines) Treat Conrad Huey / (India) Harsh Mankad
← 2008 ·	Royal Bank of Scotland Challenger	· 2010 →

The 2009 Royal Bank of Scotland Challenger was a professional tennis tournament played on outdoor hard courts. It was the third edition of the tournament which was part of the 2009 ATP Challenger Tour. It took place in Tiburon, California, United States between October 12 and October 18, 2009. It was part of the Tiburon Challenger series.

== ATP entrants ==
=== Seeds ===
Country	Player	Rank^{1}	Seed
USA	Michael Russell	91	1
USA	Kevin Kim	101	2
USA	Jesse Levine	113	3
COL	Santiago Giraldo	114	4
CRO	Roko Karanušić	132	5
USA	Donald Young	155	6
SLO	Grega Žemlja	156	7
COL	Carlos Salamanca	158	8

- Rankings are as of October 5, 2009.

=== Other entrants ===
The following players received wildcards into the singles main draw:

- (United States) Lester Cook
- (United States) Jan-Michael Gambill
- (United States) Bradley Klahn
- (United States) Greg Ouellette

The following players received entry from the qualifying draw:

- (Australia) Nick Lindahl
- (Netherlands) Igor Sijsling
- (Republic of Ireland) Louk Sorensen
- (South Africa) Izak van der Merwe
- (Russia) Artem Sitak (as a Lucky loser)

== Champions ==
=== Singles ===
(Japan) Go Soeda def. (Serbia) Ilija Bozoljac, 3–6, 6–3, 6–2

=== Doubles ===
(Philippines) Treat Conrad Huey / (India) Harsh Mankad def. (Serbia) Ilija Bozoljac / (Serbia) Dušan Vemić, 6–4, 6–4
