= 2009 Volkswagen Challenger – Singles =

Singles
- 2009 Volkswagen Challenger

Final
- Champion: (Belgium) Ruben Bemelmans
- Runner-up: (Italy) Stefano Galvani
- Score: 7–6(5), 3–6, 6–3

Events
Singles	Doubles
← 2008 ·	Volkswagen Challenger	· 2010 →

Louk Sorensen was the defending champion. He received the wild card, but he lost in the first round to future champion, Ruben Bemelmans.
Bemelmans won in the final 7–6(5), 3–6, 6–3, against Stefano Galvani.

== Seeds ==
1. (Serbia) Ilija Bozoljac (second round)
2. (Germany) Simon Stadler (first round, retired)
3. (Germany) Daniel Brands (second round)
4. (Romania) Adrian Cruciat (first round)
5. (Czech Republic) Lukáš Rosol (semifinals)
6. (United Kingdom) Alex Bogdanovic (quarterfinals)
7. (Russia) Alexandre Kudryavtsev (second round)
8. (Italy) Andrea Stoppini (second round)

== Draw ==
=== Key ===
- Q = Qualifier
- WC = Wild card
- LL = Lucky loser
- Alt = Alternate
- SE = Special exempt
- PR = Protected ranking
- ITF = ITF entry
- JE = Junior exempt
- w/o = Walkover
- r = Retired
- d = Defaulted
- SR = Special ranking

=== Final four ===
Semifinals
Q	(Belgium) Ruben Bemelmans	6	6
(Netherlands) Michel Koning	4	4
(Italy) Stefano Galvani	7	6
5	(Czech Republic) Lukáš Rosol	5	2

Final
Q	(Belgium) Ruben Bemelmans	7	3	6
(Italy) Stefano Galvani	6^{5}	6	3

=== Top half ===
First round
1	(Serbia) I Bozoljac	6	6
WC	(Germany) R Becker	2	4
(Germany) M Bachinger	6^{7}	6	6
(United States) S Jenkins	7	4	2
Q	(Belgium) R Bemelmans	6	6
WC	(Republic of Ireland) L Sorensen	3	3
WC	(Germany) J-F Brunken	3	5
8	(Italy) A Stoppini	6	7
3	(Germany) D Brands	7	6
(Israel) H Levy	6^{4}	2
(Netherlands) M Koning	6	3	6
(Belgium) N Desein	3	6	3
Q	(Uzbekistan) F Dustov	3	6^{5}
Q	(Canada) P-L Duclos	6	7
(France) G Lugassy	3	6	1
6	(United Kingdom) A Bogdanovic	6	1	6

Second round
1	(Serbia) I Bozoljac	4	r
(Germany) M Bachinger	5
Q	(Belgium) R Bemelmans	3	6	6
8	(Italy) A Stoppini	6	3	4
3	(Germany) D Brands	1	3
(Netherlands) M Koning	6	6
Q	(Canada) P-L Duclos	3	6	5
6	(United Kingdom) A Bogdanovic	6	4	7

Quarterfinals
(Germany) M Bachinger	2	5
Q	(Belgium) R Bemelmans	6	7
(Netherlands) M Koning	6	7
6	(United Kingdom) A Bogdanovic	4	5

Semifinals
Q	(Belgium) R Bemelmans	6	6
(Netherlands) M Koning	4	4

=== Bottom half ===
First round
7	(Russia) A Kudryavtsev	6	6
(Ukraine) S Bubka	2	4
(Slovakia) D Hrbatý	7	6
(Germany) D Meffert	5	3
(Austria) M Fischer	2	2
(Italy) S Galvani	6	6
Q	(Jamaica) D Brown	6	6
4	(Romania) A Cruciat	4	4
5	(Czech Republic) L Rosol	7	6
(Poland) D Olejniczak	6^{5}	0
(Australia) R Smeets	6	6
(Austria) M Slanar	4	4
(Germany) D Kindlmann	1	r
WC	(Germany) F Mayer	2
(Germany) T Kamke	4
2	(Germany) S Stadler	0	r

Second round
7	(Russia) A Kudryavtsev	3	7	4
(Slovakia) D Hrbatý	6	6^{7}	6
(Italy) S Galvani	6	3	6
Q	(Jamaica) D Brown	4	6	3
5	(Czech Republic) L Rosol	6	7
(Australia) R Smeets	4	6^{4}
WC	(Germany) F Mayer	6	3	6
(Germany) T Kamke	3	6	3

Quarterfinals
(Slovakia) D Hrbatý	3	1
(Italy) S Galvani	6	6
5	(Czech Republic) L Rosol	6	6
WC	(Germany) F Mayer	3	3

Semifinals
(Italy) S Galvani	7	6
5	(Czech Republic) L Rosol	5	2
