= 2012 Volkswagen Challenger – Singles =

Men's tennis tournament

Singles
- 2012 Volkswagen Challenger

Final
- Champion: (Netherlands) Igor Sijsling
- Runner-up: (Poland) Jerzy Janowicz
- Score: 4–6, 6–3, 7–6^{(11–9)}

Events
| Singles | Doubles |
| ← 2011 · | Volkswagen Challenger |

Ruben Bemelmans was the defending champion but decided not to participate.
Igor Sijsling defeated Jerzy Janowicz 4–6, 6–3, 7–6^{(11–9)} in the final.

== Seeds ==
1. (Netherlands) Thomas Schoorel (quarterfinals)
2. (Netherlands) Igor Sijsling (champion)
3. (Russia) Alexander Kudryavtsev (second round)
4. (Canada) Frank Dancevic (quarterfinals, retired due to a right quadrice hematoma)
5. (Germany) Dominik Meffert (second round)
6. (Russia) Konstantin Kravchuk (second round)
7. (Bosnia and Herzegovina) Amer Delić (semifinals)
8. (Belgium) Maxime Authom (first round)

== Draw ==
=== Key ===
- Q = Qualifier
- WC = Wild card
- LL = Lucky loser
- Alt = Alternate
- ITF = ITF entry
- PR = Protected ranking
- SR = Special ranking
- SE = Special exempt
- JE = Junior exempt
- JR = Junior Accelerator Programme entrant
- CO = College Accelerator Programme entrant
- NG = Next Gen Accelerator Program entrant
- w/o = Walkover
- r = Retired
- d = Defaulted

=== Finals ===
Semifinals
Q | (Kazakhstan) Evgeny Korolev | 3 | 7^{7} | 4
(Poland) Jerzy Janowicz | 6 | 6^{5} | 6
7 | (Bosnia and Herzegovina) Amer Delić | 6^{3} | 3
2 | (Netherlands) Igor Sijsling | 7^{7} | 6

Final
(Poland) Jerzy Janowicz | 6 | 3 | 6^{9}
2 | (Netherlands) Igor Sijsling | 4 | 6 | 7^{11}

=== Top half ===
First round
1 | (Netherlands) T Schoorel | 7^{8} | 7
(Czech Republic) J Mertl | 6^{6} | 5
WC | (Serbia) I Bozoljac | 6 | 7
Alt | (Germany) Stefan Seifert | 4 | 5
Q | (Germany) M Zimmermann | 4 | 6^{3}
Q | (Kazakhstan) E Korolev | 6 | 7^{7}
(Belarus) U Ignatik | 6 | 6
8 | (Belgium) M Authom | 1 | 2
4 | (Canada) F Dancevic | 7 | 6
Q | (Italy) L Vanni | 5 | 4
(Austria) M Fischer | 6^{5} | 7 | 1
(Denmark) F Nielsen | 7^{7} | 5 | 6
(Slovakia) K Čapkovič | 2 | 4
(Poland) J Janowicz | 6 | 6
(Switzerland) M Lammer | 1 | 5
5 | (Germany) D Meffert | 6 | 7

Second round
1 | (Netherlands) T Schoorel | 5
WC | (Serbia) I Bozoljac | 5^{r}
Q | (Kazakhstan) E Korolev | 6 | 6
(Belarus) U Ignatik | 4 | 4
4 | (Canada) F Dancevic | 7^{8} | 1
(Denmark) F Nielsen | 6^{6} | 0^{r}
(Poland) J Janowicz | 6 | 7^{7}
5 | (Germany) D Meffert | 4 | 6^{2}

Quarterfinals
1 | (Netherlands) T Schoorel | 7 | 4 | 3
Q | (Kazakhstan) E Korolev | 5 | 6 | 6
4 | (Canada) F Dancevic | 6^{3} | 3^{r}
(Poland) J Janowicz | 7^{7} | 5

Semifinals
Q | (Kazakhstan) E Korolev | 3 | 7^{7} | 4
(Poland) J Janowicz | 6 | 6^{5} | 6

=== Bottom half ===
First round
7 | (Bosnia and Herzegovina) A Delić | 6 | 6
WC | (Germany) N Langer | 3 | 2
Q | (Slovakia) A Martin | 4 | 6 | 4
(Serbia) D Lajović | 6 | 4 | 6
(United Kingdom) J Goodall | 2 | 4
(Germany) P Gojowczyk | 6 | 6
(Uzbekistan) F Dustov | 7^{7} | 3 | 6^{5}
3 | (Russia) A Kudryavtsev | 6^{2} | 6 | 7^{7}
6 | (Russia) K Kravchuk | 7^{7} | 6
WC | (Germany) R Becker | 6^{5} | 3
(Germany) P Torebko | 6^{7} | 6 | 6
(Germany) D Gremelmayr | 7^{9} | 4 | 2
WC | (Germany) S Rieschick | 6 | 6^{2} | 6^{2}
(Netherlands) J Huta Galung | 3 | 7^{7} | 7^{7}
(Lithuania) L Grigelis | 3 | 5
2 | (Netherlands) I Sijsling | 6 | 7

Second round
7 | (Bosnia and Herzegovina) A Delić | 6 | 6
(Serbia) D Lajović | 2 | 4
(Germany) P Gojowczyk | 6 | 4 | 7^{7}
3 | (Russia) A Kudryavtsev | 2 | 6 | 6^{4}
6 | (Russia) K Kravchuk | 3 | 2
(Germany) P Torebko | 6 | 6
(Netherlands) J Huta Galung | 3 | 6^{2}
2 | (Netherlands) I Sijsling | 6 | 7^{7}

Quarterfinals
7 | (Bosnia and Herzegovina) A Delić | 4 | 7^{8} | 6
(Germany) P Gojowczyk | 6 | 6^{6} | 3
(Germany) P Torebko | 2 | 3
2 | (Netherlands) I Sijsling | 6 | 6

Semifinals
7 | (Bosnia and Herzegovina) A Delić | 6^{3} | 3
2 | (Netherlands) I Sijsling | 7^{7} | 6
