= 2011 Volkswagen Challenger – Doubles =

Doubles
- 2011 Volkswagen Challenger

Final
- Champions: (Germany) Matthias Bachinger (Germany) Simon Stadler
- Runners-up: (Germany) Dominik Meffert (Denmark) Frederik Nielsen
- Score: 3–6, 7–6(3), [10–7]

Events
Singles	Doubles
← 2010 ·	Volkswagen Challenger	· 2012 →

Travis Rettenmaier and Ken Skupski were the defending champions from the last edition of the tournament in 2009. They chose not to participate this year.
Matthias Bachinger and Simon Stadler defeated Dominik Meffert and Frederik Nielsen 3–6, 7–6(3), [10–7] in the final.

== Seeds ==
1. (Germany) Frank Moser / (Czech Republic) David Škoch (quarterfinals)
2. (United Kingdom) Jamie Delgado / (United Kingdom) Jamie Murray (first round)
3. (Thailand) Sanchai Ratiwatana / (Thailand) Sonchat Ratiwatana (first round)
4. (United States) Brian Battistone / (Sweden) Andreas Siljeström (first round)

== Draw ==
=== Key ===
- Q = Qualifier
- WC = Wild card
- LL = Lucky loser
- Alt = Alternate
- SE = Special exempt
- PR = Protected ranking
- ITF = ITF entry
- JE = Junior exempt
- w/o = Walkover
- r = Retired
- d = Defaulted
- SR = Special ranking

=== Draw ===
First round
1	(Germany) F Moser (Czech Republic) D Škoch	6	4	[11]
(Poland) T Bednarek (Germany) A Begemann	1	6	[9]
(Germany) G Kretschmer (Germany) A Satschko	3	2
(Germany) D Meffert (Denmark) F Nielsen	6	6
4	(United States) B Battistone (Sweden) A Siljeström	2	3
(Belgium) R Bemelmans (Belgium) O Rochus	6	6
(Switzerland) Y Allegro (Germany) A Beck	3	7	[8]
(Germany) M Emmrich (Poland) M Kowalczyk	6	5	[10]
(Austria) M Fischer (Austria) P Oswald	6	1	[10]
WC	(Russia) V Baluda (India) Sri. Narayanaswamy	4	6	[4]
WC	(Germany) M Bachinger (Germany) S Stadler	7	4	[10]
3	(Thailand) Sa Ratiwatana (Thailand) So Ratiwatana	6^{5}	6	[8]
(Germany) P Marx (Germany) S Rieschick	6	6
WC	(Germany) Julius Henneke (Czech Republic) Marek Pešička	2	2
(Russia) M Elgin (Russia) A Kudryavtsev	6	6
2	(United Kingdom) J Delgado (United Kingdom) J Marray	2	4

Quarterfinals
1	(Germany) F Moser (Czech Republic) D Škoch	1	4
(Germany) D Meffert (Denmark) F Nielsen	6	6
(Belgium) R Bemelmans (Belgium) O Rochus	5	6^{3}
(Germany) M Emmrich (Poland) M Kowalczyk	7	7
(Austria) M Fischer (Austria) P Oswald	7	4	[7]
WC	(Germany) M Bachinger (Germany) S Stadler	5	6	[10]
(Germany) P Marx (Germany) S Rieschick	6	6^{6}	[8]
(Russia) M Elgin (Russia) A Kudryavtsev	3	7	[10]

Semifinals
(Germany) D Meffert (Denmark) F Nielsen	7	6
(Germany) M Emmrich (Poland) M Kowalczyk	6^{3}	4
WC	(Germany) M Bachinger (Germany) S Stadler	7	7
(Russia) M Elgin (Russia) A Kudryavtsev	6^{5}	6^{5}

Final
(Germany) D Meffert (Denmark) F Nielsen	6	6^{3}	[7]
WC	(Germany) M Bachinger (Germany) S Stadler	3	7	[10]
