= 2012 Volkswagen Challenger – Doubles =

Doubles
- 2012 Volkswagen Challenger

Final
- Champions: (Lithuania) Laurynas Grigelis (Belarus) Uladzimir Ignatik
- Runners-up: (Poland) Tomasz Bednarek (France) Olivier Charroin
- Score: 7–5, 4–6, [10–5]

Events
Singles	Doubles
← 2011 ·	Volkswagen Challenger

Matthias Bachinger and Simon Stadler were the defending champions but Bachinger decided not to participate.
Stadler plays alongside Travis Rettenmaier, losing in the first round.
Laurynas Grigelis and Uladzimir Ignatik won the title 7–5, 4–6, [10–5] in the final against Tomasz Bednarek and Olivier Charroin.

== Seeds ==
1. (Denmark) Frederik Nielsen / (Croatia) Lovro Zovko (quarterfinals, withdrew)
2. (Australia) Jordan Kerr / (United States) Travis Parrott (first round)
3. (Poland) Tomasz Bednarek / (France) Olivier Charroin (final)
4. (United States) Travis Rettenmaier / (Germany) Simon Stadler (first round)

== Draw ==
=== Key ===
- Q = Qualifier
- WC = Wild card
- LL = Lucky loser
- Alt = Alternate
- SE = Special exempt
- PR = Protected ranking
- ITF = ITF entry
- JE = Junior exempt
- w/o = Walkover
- r = Retired
- d = Defaulted
- SR = Special ranking

=== Draw ===
First round
1	(Denmark) F Nielsen (Croatia) L Zovko	7^{9}	5	[14]
WC	(Germany) S Rieschick (Germany) Stefan Seifert	6^{7}	7	[12]
(Serbia) D Lajović (Austria) N Moser	4	6	[10]
WC	(Germany) Matthias Dörfler (Germany) Friedrich Klasen	6	4	[6]
3	(Poland) T Bednarek (France) O Charroin	6	6
WC	(Germany) Julius Henneke (Czech Republic) Petr Vaníček	2	2
(Australia) R Junaid (Czech Republic) D Škoch	5	6	[10]
(Germany) P Torebko (Italy) L Vanni	7	3	[6]
(Germany) P Gojowczyk (Germany) D Meffert	6^{5}	6	[10]
(Poland) J Janowicz (Russia) A Kudryavtsev	7^{7}	4	[8]
(Netherlands) J Huta Galung (Netherlands) I Sijsling	2	7	[11]
4	(United States) T Rettenmaier (Germany) S Stadler	6	5	[9]
(Lithuania) L Grigelis (Belarus) U Ignatik	6	6
(Austria) M Fischer (Germany) M Zimmermann	3	4
(Canada) F Dancevic (Bosnia and Herzegovina) A Delić	5	7^{7}	[10]
2	(Australia) J Kerr (United States) T Parrott	7	6^{2}	[7]

Quarterfinals
1	(Denmark) F Nielsen (Croatia) L Zovko
(Serbia) D Lajović (Austria) N Moser	w/o
3	(Poland) T Bednarek (France) O Charroin	6^{4}	7^{7}	[10]
(Australia) R Junaid (Czech Republic) D Škoch	7^{7}	6^{3}	[3]
(Germany) P Gojowczyk (Germany) D Meffert
(Netherlands) J Huta Galung (Netherlands) I Sijsling	w/o
(Lithuania) L Grigelis (Belarus) U Ignatik	6	4	[10]
(Canada) F Dancevic (Bosnia and Herzegovina) A Delić	4	6	[3]

Semifinals
(Serbia) D Lajović (Austria) N Moser	5	6	[6]
3	(Poland) T Bednarek (France) O Charroin	7	3	[10]
(Netherlands) J Huta Galung (Netherlands) I Sijsling	6^{4}	5
(Lithuania) L Grigelis (Belarus) U Ignatik	7^{7}	7

Final
3	(Poland) T Bednarek (France) O Charroin	5	6	[5]
(Lithuania) L Grigelis (Belarus) U Ignatik	7	4	[10]
