= Thomas Messmer =

German tennis player

- Country (sports): Germany
- Born: 25 November 1979 (age 45)
- Plays: Right-handed
- Prize money: $16,159

Singles
- Career record: 0–1
- Highest ranking: No. 498 (23 Oct 2000)

Doubles
- Career record: 0–1
- Highest ranking: No. 272 (4 May 1998)

Thomas Messmer (born 25 November 1979) is a German former professional tennis player.

Messmer won a World Youth Cup (Junior Davis Cup) title with Germany in 1995 and was victorious in all four of his singles matches during the campaign. His only ATP Tour main draw appearances came at Scottsdale in 1998, losing in the first round of the singles to Richard Fromberg. He partnered with Boris Becker in the doubles.

== ATP Challenger and ITF Futures finals ==
=== Doubles: 6 (1–5) ===
Legend
ATP Challenger (0–1)
ITF Futures (1–4)

Result	W–L	Date	Tournament	Tier	Surface	Partner	Opponents	Score
Loss	0–1	Feb 1998	Volkswagen Challenger, Wolfsburg	Challenger	Carpet	(Germany) Jan-Ralph Brandt	(Russia) Marat Safin (Federal Republic of Yugoslavia) Dušan Vemić	4–6, 6–4, 2–6
Loss	0–1	Apr 1998	Germany F3, Riemerling	Futures	Clay	(Germany) Jan-Ralph Brandt	(Czech Republic) Tomáš Cibulec (Czech Republic) Petr Kovačka	5–7, 6–4, 3–6
Win	1–1	Jun 1998	Germany F11, Trier	Futures	Clay	(Germany) Gerald Fauser	(Germany) Jens Gerlach (Germany) Jan Gruninger	6–4, 6–4
Loss	1–2	May 2000	Algeria F2, Algiers	Futures	Clay	(Switzerland) Marco Chiudinelli	(Spain) Pedro Nieto-Orellana (Spain) Javier Perez-Vazquez	2–6, 1–6
Loss	1–3	May 2000	Italy F1, Verona	Futures	Clay	(Switzerland) Jean-Claude Scherrer	(Italy) Filippo Messori (Italy) Davide Scala	1–6, 7–6^{(0)}, 3–6
Loss	1–4	Sep 2000	Czech Republic F2, Karlovy Vary	Futures	Clay	(Australia) Steven Randjelovic	(Czech Republic) Jiri Hobler (Czech Republic) Pavel Šnobel	6–3, 4–6, 4–6
