= 2009 Royal Bank of Scotland Challenger – Doubles =

Doubles
- 2009 Royal Bank of Scotland Challenger

Final
- Champions: (Philippines) Treat Conrad Huey (India) Harsh Mankad
- Runners-up: (Serbia) Ilija Bozoljac (Serbia) Dušan Vemić
- Score: 6–4, 6–4

Events
Singles	Doubles
← 2008 ·	Royal Bank of Scotland Challenger	· 2010 →

Treat Conrad Huey and Harsh Mankad defeated Serbian pair Ilija Bozoljac and Dušan Vemić 6–4, 6–4 in the final.

== Seeds ==
1. (Mexico) Santiago González / (United States) Travis Rettenmaier (first round)
2. (Serbia) Ilija Bozoljac / (Serbia) Dušan Vemić (final)
3. (Philippines) Treat Conrad Huey / (India) Harsh Mankad (champions)
4. (United States) Lester Cook / (United States) David Martin (semifinals)

== Draw ==
=== Key ===
- Q = Qualifier
- WC = Wild card
- LL = Lucky loser
- Alt = Alternate
- SE = Special exempt
- PR = Protected ranking
- ITF = ITF entry
- JE = Junior exempt
- w/o = Walkover
- r = Retired
- d = Defaulted
- SR = Special ranking

=== Draw ===
First round
1	(Mexico) S González (United States) T Rettenmaier	3	1
LL	(Italy) T Fabbiano (Italy) M Marrai	6	6
WC	(United States) W Gray (United States) V Spadea	4	6	[10]
(India) P Amritraj (United States) K Kim	6	2	[5]
3	(Philippines) TC Huey (India) H Mankad	6	6
(Uruguay) M Felder (Colombia) C Salamanca	3	2
WC	(United States) P Pires de Almeida (United States) R Rizza	4	5
Q	(Australia) M Reid (Netherlands) I Sijsling	6	7
LL	(United States) M Fuller (Russia) A Sitak
WC	(United States) J Levine (United States) G Ouellette	w/o
(United States) A Kuznetsov (United States) T Widom	w/o
4	(United States) L Cook (United States) D Martin
(Italy) R Ghedin (Switzerland) M Lammer	6	7
(Australia) N Lindahl (Japan) G Soeda	3	5
(Croatia) R Karanušić (Slovenia) G Žemlja	6	4	[5]
2	(Serbia) I Bozoljac (Serbia) D Vemić	3	6	[10]

Quarterfinals
LL	(Italy) T Fabbiano (Italy) M Marrai	2	1
WC	(United States) W Gray (United States) V Spadea	6	6
3	(Philippines) TC Huey (India) H Mankad	6	6
Q	(Australia) M Reid (Netherlands) I Sijsling	1	4
LL	(United States) M Fuller (Russia) A Sitak	2	4
4	(United States) L Cook (United States) D Martin	6	6
(Italy) R Ghedin (Switzerland) M Lammer	4	3
2	(Serbia) I Bozoljac (Serbia) D Vemić	6	6

Semifinals
WC	(United States) W Gray (United States) V Spadea	1	6	[3]
3	(Philippines) TC Huey (India) H Mankad	6	4	[10]
4	(United States) L Cook (United States) D Martin	6	5	[8]
2	(Serbia) I Bozoljac (Serbia) D Vemić	1	7	[10]

Finals
3	(Philippines) TC Huey (India) H Mankad	6	6
2	(Serbia) I Bozoljac (Serbia) D Vemić	4	4
