= 2009 Royal Bank of Scotland Challenger – Singles =

Singles
- 2009 Royal Bank of Scotland Challenger

Final
- Champion: (Japan) Go Soeda
- Runner-up: (Serbia) Ilija Bozoljac
- Score: 3–6, 6–3, 6–2

Events
Singles	Doubles
← 2008 ·	Royal Bank of Scotland Challenger	· 2010 →

Go Soeda won the title, after win against Ilija Bozoljac 3–6, 6–3, 6–2 in the final match.

== Seeds ==
1. (United States) Michael Russell (quarterfinals, retired due to a diaherrea and nausea)
2. (United States) Kevin Kim (semifinals)
3. (United States) Jesse Levine (quarterfinals)
4. (Colombia) Santiago Giraldo (quarterfinals)
5. (Croatia) Roko Karanušić (quarterfinals)
6. (United States) Donald Young (first round)
7. (Slovenia) Grega Žemlja (second round)
8. (Colombia) Carlos Salamanca (first round)

== Draw ==
=== Key ===
- Q = Qualifier
- WC = Wild card
- LL = Lucky loser
- Alt = Alternate
- SE = Special exempt
- PR = Protected ranking
- ITF = ITF entry
- JE = Junior exempt
- w/o = Walkover
- r = Retired
- d = Defaulted
- SR = Special ranking

=== Finals ===
Semifinals
Q	(Australia) Nick Lindahl	4	3
(Serbia) Ilija Bozoljac	6	6
(Japan) Go Soeda	7	6
2	(United States) Kevin Kim	5	1

Final
(Serbia) Ilija Bozoljac	6	3	2
(Japan) Go Soeda	3	6	6

=== Top half ===
First round
1	(United States) M Russell	7	1	7
Q	(Republic of Ireland) L Sorensen	5	6	5
(Germany) S Stadler	6	6
WC	(United States) G Ouellette	1	1
Q	(Netherlands) I Sijsling	6	2	1
Q	(Australia) N Lindahl	4	6	6
(Mexico) S González	6^{4}	0
7	(Slovenia) G Žemlja	7	6
3	(United States) J Levine	6	6
(Switzerland) M Lammer	3	4
(United States) V Spadea	2	7	6
(Australia) M Matosevic	6	6^{3}	0
(Uruguay) M Felder	7	4	1
(United States) T Widom	6^{5}	6	6
(Serbia) I Bozoljac	6	7
6	(United States) D Young	4	6^{3}

Second round
1	(United States) M Russell	7	6
(Germany) S Stadler	6^{3}	2
Q	(Australia) N Lindahl	6	6
7	(Slovenia) G Žemlja	4	4
3	(United States) J Levine	2	6	6
(United States) V Spadea	6	2	2
(United States) T Widom	4	1	r
(Serbia) I Bozoljac	6	3

Quarterfinals
1	(United States) M Russell	0	2	r
Q	(Australia) N Lindahl	6	3
3	(United States) J Levine	6^{6}	2
(Serbia) I Bozoljac	7	6

Semifinals
Q	(Australia) N Lindahl	4	3
(Serbia) I Bozoljac	6	6

=== Bottom half ===
First round
8	(Colombia) C Salamanca	4	4
WC	(United States) B Klahn	6	6
(Japan) G Soeda	6	7
WC	(United States) J-M Gambill	4	5
(United States) A Kuznetsov	7	7
ALT	(India) P Amritraj	6^{1}	6^{4}
WC	(United States) L Cook	5	3
4	(Colombia) S Giraldo	7	6
5	(Croatia) R Karanušić	2	7	6
ALT	(Colombia) A González	6	6^{5}	4
Q	(South Africa) I van der Merwe	7	1	6
LL	(Russia) A Sitak	5	6	2
(United Kingdom) J Goodall	3	1
ALT	(Italy) R Ghedin	6	6
(United States) J Witten	1	0
2	(United States) K Kim	6	6

Second round
WC	(United States) B Klahn	2	4
(Japan) G Soeda	6	6
(United States) A Kuznetsov	2	5
4	(Colombia) S Giraldo	6	7
5	(Croatia) R Karanušić	6	4	6
Q	(South Africa) I van der Merwe	2	6	3
ALT	(Italy) R Ghedin	2	0
2	(United States) K Kim	6	6

Quarterfinals
(Japan) G Soeda	6	6
4	(Colombia) S Giraldo	4	0
5	(Croatia) R Karanušić	3	3
2	(United States) K Kim	6	6

Semifinals
(Japan) G Soeda	7	6
2	(United States) K Kim	5	1
