= Jan-Ralph Brandt =

German tennis player

- Country (sports): Germany
- Born: 23 January 1978 (age 47) Weiterstadt, Germany
- Plays: Right-handed
- Prize money: $21,492

Singles
- Career record: 0–0
- Career titles: 0; 0 Challenger, 1 Futures
- Highest ranking: No. 345 (7 June 1999)

Doubles
- Career record: 0–1
- Career titles: 0; 2 Challenger, 2 Futures
- Highest ranking: No. 228 (14 February 2000)
- Last updated on: 5 January 2022.

Jan-Ralph Brandt (born 23 January 1978) is a German former professional tennis player.

Brandt, who comes from Weiterstadt, was considered a player of promise and reached the junior doubles final at the 1996 French Open. He made his only ATP Tour main draw appearance in doubles at the 2000 Hamburg Masters and won two doubles titles on the ATP Challenger Tour.

== Junior Grand Slam finals ==
=== Doubles: 1 (1 runner-up) ===
| Result | Year | Tournament | Surface | Partner | Opponents | Score |
|---|---|---|---|---|---|---|
| Loss | 1996 | French Open | Clay | (Germany) Daniel Elsner | (France) Sebastien Grosjean (France) Olivier Mutis | 2–6, 3–6 |

== ATP Challenger and ITF Futures finals ==
=== Singles: 3 (1–2) ===
| Legend ATP Challenger (0–0) ITF Futures (1–2) | Finals by surface Hard (1–1) Clay (0–0) Grass (0–0) Carpet (0–1) |

| Result | W–L | Date | Tournament | Tier | Surface | Opponent | Score |
|---|---|---|---|---|---|---|---|
| Win | 1–0 | Apr 1998 | Greece F3, Chalkida | Futures | Hard | (Sweden) Fredrik Jonsson | 6–2, 6–1 |
| Loss | 1–1 | Apr 1999 | France F4, Clermont-Ferrand | Futures | Carpet | (Germany) Alexander Popp | 6–2, 2–6, 2–6 |
| Loss | 1–2 | May 1999 | Greece F2, Filippiada | Futures | Hard | (Sweden) Jan Hermansson | 2–6, 0–6 |

=== Doubles: 8 (4–4) ===
| Legend ATP Challenger (2–2) ITF Futures (2–2) | Finals by surface Hard (2–1) Clay (0–1) Grass (1–0) Carpet (1–2) |

| Result | W–L | Date | Tournament | Tier | Surface | Partner | Opponents | Score |
|---|---|---|---|---|---|---|---|---|
| Loss | 0–1 | Feb 1998 | Wolfsburg, Germany | Challenger | Carpet | (Germany) Thomas Messmer | (Russia) Marat Safin (Socialist Federal Republic of Yugoslavia) Dušan Vemić | 4–6, 6–4, 2–6 |
| Loss | 0–2 | Apr 1998 | Germany F3, Riemerling | Futures | Clay | (Germany) Thomas Messmer | (Czech Republic) Petr Kovačka (Czech Republic) Tomáš Cibulec | 5–7, 6–4, 3–6 |
| Loss | 0–3 | Jun 1998 | Canada F2, Montreal | Futures | Hard | (United States) Michael Russell | (Canada) Simon Larose (Canada) Jocelyn Robichaud | 3–6, 4–6 |
| Loss | 0–4 | Mar 1999 | Magdeburg, Germany | Challenger | Carpet | (Germany) Dirk Dier | (Australia) Andrew Painter (Australia) Michael Hill | 6–7, 7–6, 6–7 |
| Win | 1–4 | May 1999 | Greece F2, Filippiada | Futures | Hard | (Germany) Markus Menzler | (Belgium) Gilles Elseneer (Israel) Eyal Erlich | 6–7, 6–4, 6–4 |
| Win | 2–4 | May 1999 | Greece F3, Ioannina | Futures | Hard | (Germany) Markus Menzler | (Greece) Konstantinos Economidis (Greece) Nikos Rovas | 6–2, 6–2 |
| Win | 3–4 | Jul 1999 | Bristol, United Kingdom | Challenger | Grass | (South Africa) Jeff Coetzee | (Australia) Luke Bourgeois (Australia) Dejan Petrovic | 6–4, 6–3 |
| Win | 4–4 | Feb 2000 | Wolfsburg, Germany | Challenger | Carpet | (Germany) Martin Sinner | (Czech Republic) Tomáš Cibulec (Czech Republic) Leoš Friedl | 7–5, 3–6, 7–6^{(9–7)} |
