= Dušan Vemić =

Serbian tennis player and coach

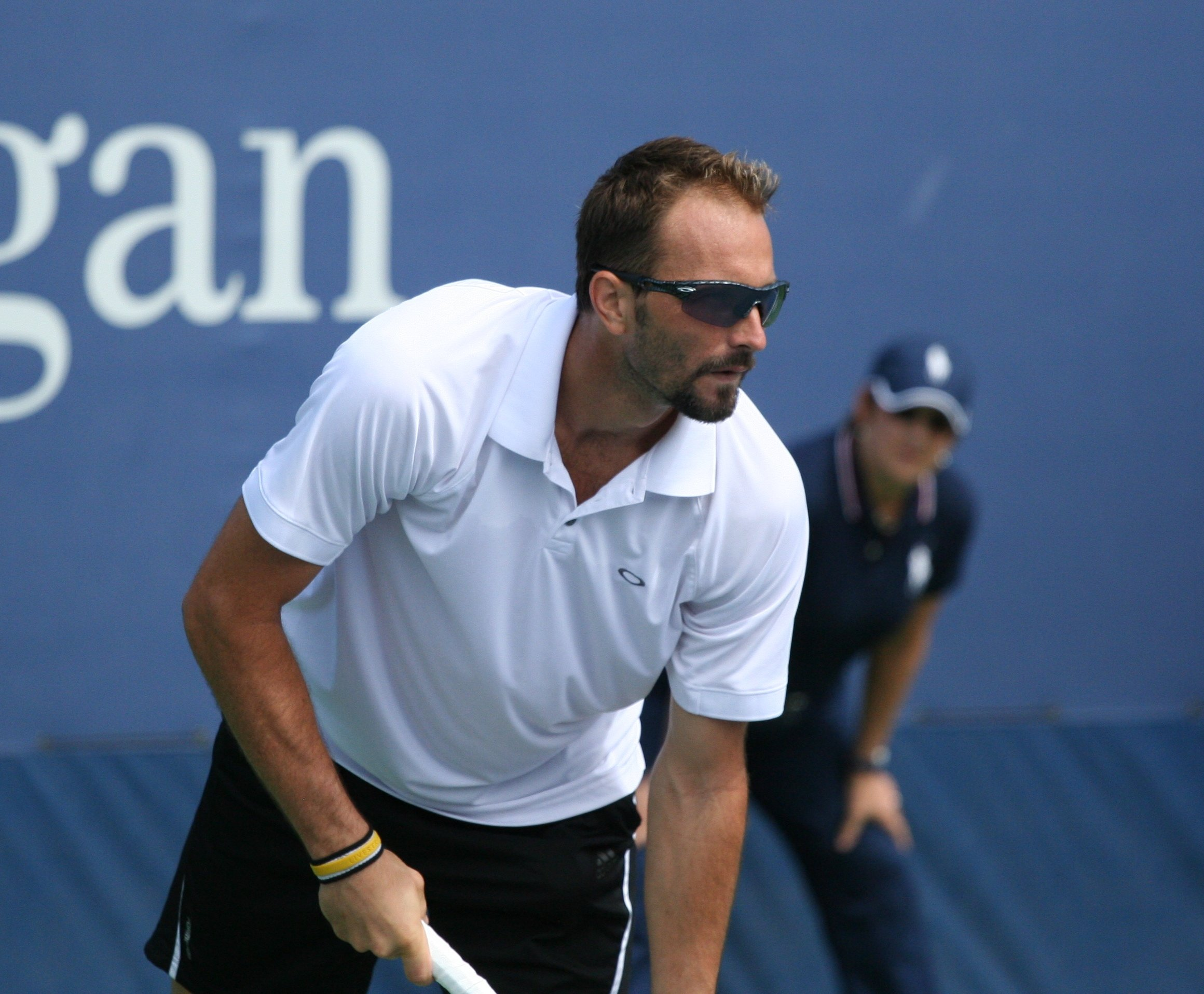
- Vemić at 2009 US Open
- Country (sports): Yugoslavia (1995–2003); Serbia and Montenegro (2003–2006); Serbia (2006–2011)
- Residence: Los Angeles, United States
- Born: 17 June 1976 (age 49) Zadar, SR Croatia, SFR Yugoslavia
- Height: 1.90 m (6 ft 3 in)
- Turned pro: 1995
- Retired: 2011
- Plays: Right-handed (two-handed backhand)
- Prize money: $821,902

Singles
- Career record: 14–19 (42.42%)
- Career titles: 0
- Highest ranking: No. 146 (25 February 2008)

Grand Slam singles results
- Australian Open: Q3 (2000)
- French Open: 1R (2007)
- Wimbledon: Q2 (2000, 2006, 2007)
- US Open: Q2 (2007)

Doubles
- Career record: 54–76 (41.54%)
- Career titles: 0
- Highest ranking: No. 31 (12 January 2009)

Grand Slam doubles results
- Australian Open: SF (2010)
- French Open: SF (2008)
- Wimbledon: 3R (2006)
- US Open: QF (2008)

Grand Slam mixed doubles results
- Australian Open: 2R (2009)
- French Open: 2R (2009)
- Wimbledon: 3R (2000)
- US Open: QF (2008)
- Last updated on: 31 January 2022.

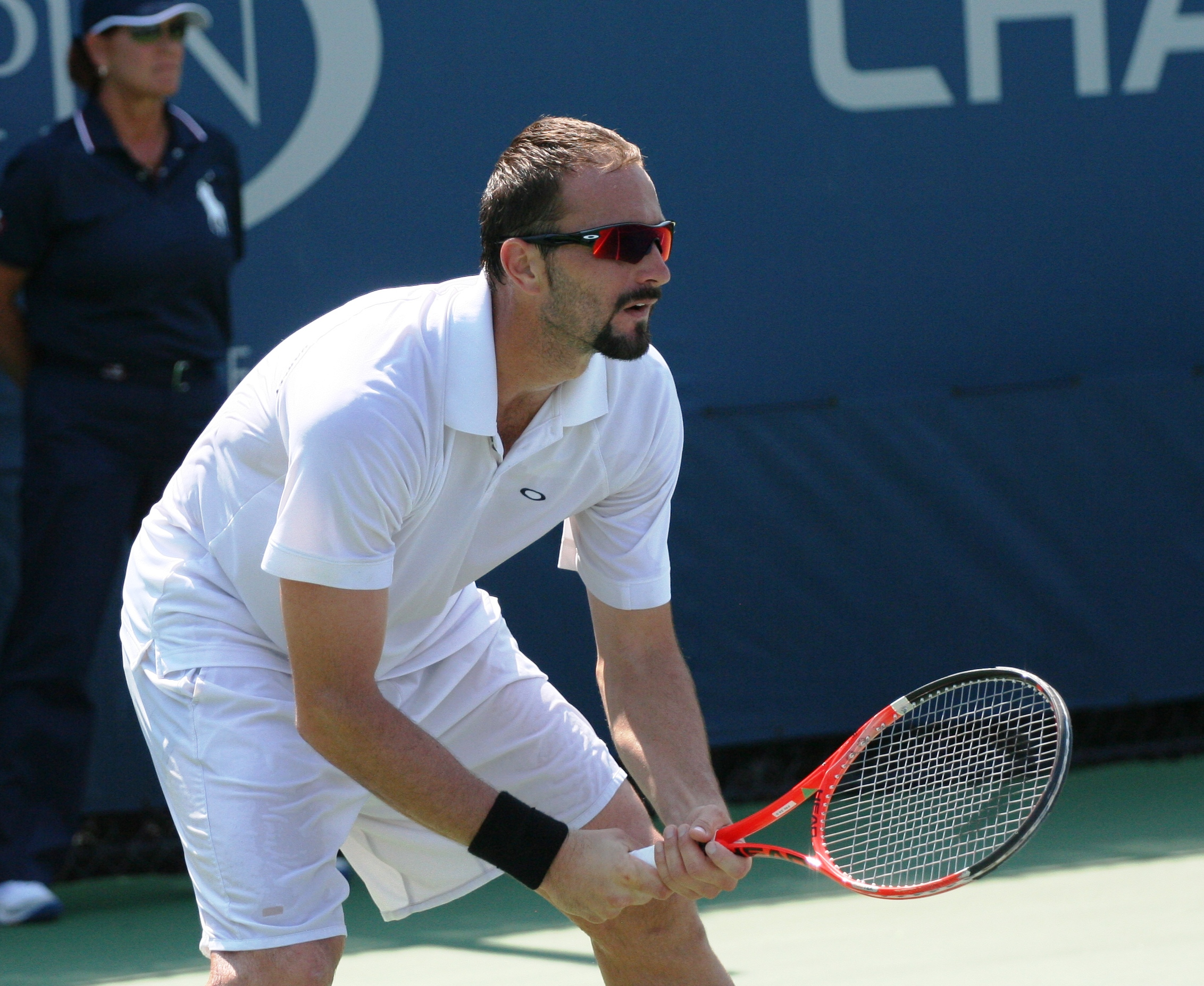
Vemić at 2010 US Open

Dušan Vemić (Serbian Cyrillic: Душан Вемић; born 17 June 1976) is a Serbian tennis coach and former professional tennis player.

== Professional career ==
Vemić turned professional in 1995. He reached a career-high singles ranking of world No. 146 on 25 February 2008 and a career-high doubles ranking of No. 31 on 12 January 2009. He is ranked 19th on the list of Fastest recorded tennis serves with a serve speed of 235 km/h (146 mph).

In 2007, Vemić began the season ranked No. 406, a drop of 170 places from early 2006. That year, he competed in Futures, the Challenger Tour, and selected ATP Tour events. His results included two Futures semifinals, one final, three ATP main draw qualifications, and a win in a top-level Challenger. These results returned him to the top 300 in April. He later reached the semifinals of the Challenger in Bermuda and qualified for the main draw of the French Open, where he lost in four sets to Janko Tipsarević. In August, he reached the semifinals in Segovia and the final in Binghamton, returning to the top 200 for the first time since 2004.

In 2008, Vemić competed for the Kansas City Explorers in World Team Tennis, reaching the league final against the New York Buzz.

He won five doubles titles on the 2008 ATP Challenger Tour: in Miami, United States (with Ilija Bozoljac); Sunrise, Florida (with Janko Tipsarević); Cremona, Italy (with Eduardo Schwank); Waco, Texas (with Alex Bogomolov Jr.); and Calabasas, California (with Ilija Bozoljac).

In Grand Slam competition, Vemić reached the doubles semifinals of the 2008 French Open and the quarterfinals of the 2008 US Open, partnering with Bruno Soares.

In 2009, he played doubles with several players including Jamie Murray, Ivo Karlović, Novak Djokovic, and Mischa Zverev.

At the 2010 Australian Open, Vemić and Karlović reached the doubles semifinals, losing to Daniel Nestor and Nenad Zimonjić 6–4, 6–4.

== Coaching career ==
Following his professional playing career, Vemić briefly coached WTA player Andrea Petkovic, assisting her and coach Petar Popović in reaching a career-high WTA ranking of No. 9.

Soon afterward, Vemić joined the coaching team of world No. 1 Novak Djokovic. As part of Djokovic's team, he coached alongside longtime head coach Marián Vajda during several major tournaments, including the US Open (2011, 2012), the Australian Open (2012, 2013), the French Open (2012, 2013), and Wimbledon (2012, 2013). During this period, Djokovic won two Grand Slam titles at the Australian Open and one at the US Open, as well as the 2012 ATP World Tour Finals in London.

In 2016, Vemić coached Djokovic at the ATP Miami Open, where Djokovic defeated Kei Nishikori 6–3, 6–3 in the final, surpassing Roger Federer in career prize money earnings.

In January 2013, Vemić joined the coaching staff of the Serbian Davis Cup team, helping lead the team to the Davis Cup final against the Czech Republic. He continued as part of the coaching staff during the 2016 Davis Cup World Group competition.

In August 2016, Vemić served as the official coach of the Serbian men's tennis team at the 2016 Summer Olympics in Rio de Janeiro. The team included world No. 1 Novak Djokovic, former world No. 1 doubles player Nenad Zimonjić, and top-30 ATP player Viktor Troicki.

From August 2016 to 2017, Vemić was the head coach of the American doubles team Bob and Mike Bryan, considered the most successful doubles team in tennis history.

From May 2020 to February 2022, he coached American player Brandon Nakashima.

As of May 2025, Vemić shares the role of head coach for Novak Djokovic with fellow Serbian coach Boris Bošnjaković.

== ATP career finals ==
=== Doubles: 2 (2 runner-ups) ===
Legend Grand Slam Tournaments (0–0) ATP World Tour Finals (0–0) ATP Masters Series (0–0) ATP Championship Series (0–1) ATP World Series (0–1)	Finals by surface Hard (0–1) Clay (0–1) Grass (0–0) Carpet (0–0)	Finals by setting Outdoors (0–2) Indoors (0–0)

Result	W–L	Date	Tournament	Tier	Surface	Partner	Opponents	Score
Loss	0–1	Aug 1999	Kitzbühel, Austria	Championship Series	Clay	(Spain) Álex Calatrava	(South Africa) Chris Haggard (Sweden) Peter Nyborg	3–6, 7–6^{(7–4)}, 6–7^{(4–7)}
Loss	0–2	Aug 2008	Los Angeles, United States	International Series	Hard	(United States) Travis Parrott	(India) Rohan Bopanna (United States) Eric Butorac	6–7^{(5–7)}, 6–7^{(5–7)}

== ATP Challenger and ITF Futures finals ==
=== Singles: 12 (3–9) ===
Legend ATP Challenger (1–5) ITF Futures (2–4)	Finals by surface Hard (1–6) Clay (2–2) Grass (0–1) Carpet (0–0)

Result	W–L	Date	Tournament	Tier	Surface	Opponent	Score
Win	1-0	Sep 1997	Skopje, Macedonia	Challenger	Clay	(Austria) Clemens Trimmel	6–3, 6–7, 6–3
Loss	1-1	Mar 2003	USA F5, Harlingen	Futures	Hard	(United States) Huntley Montgomery	4–6, 7–6^{(7–4)}, 5–7
Win	2-1	May 2003	USA F12, Tampa	Futures	Clay	(Paraguay) Francisco Rodríguez	6–1, 6–4
Win	3-1	Oct 2003	USA F28, Lubbock	Futures	Hard	(Brazil) Bruno Soares	6–7^{(5–7)}, 7–6^{(7–3)}, 6–3
Loss	3-2	Oct 2003	USA F29, Arlington	Futures	Hard	(Argentina) Juan Pablo Guzmán	3–6, 5–7
Loss	3-3	Jun 2004	Forest Hills, United States	Challenger	Grass	(United States) Justin Gimelstob	6–7^{(7–9)}, 2–6
Loss	3-4	May 2005	Forest Hills, United States	Challenger	Clay	(United States) James Blake	3–6, 4–6
Loss	3-5	Jan 2007	USA F2, North Miami Beach	Futures	Hard	(Mexico) Bruno Echagaray	2–6, 7–6^{(7–5)}, 5–7
Loss	3-6	Aug 2007	Binghamton, United States	Challenger	Hard	(Sweden) Thomas Johansson	4–6, 6–7^{(7–9)}
Loss	3-7	Sep 2007	Lubbock, United States	Challenger	Hard	(Australia) Robert Smeets	3–6, 6–7^{(7–9)}
Loss	3-8	Jan 2008	USA F1, Wesley Chapel	Futures	Hard	(India) Somdev Devvarman	6–4, 4–6, 4–6
Loss	3-9	May 2008	Tunis, Tunisia	Challenger	Clay	(Brazil) Thomaz Bellucci	2–6, 4–6

=== Doubles: 37 (16–21) ===
Legend ATP Challenger (15–20) ITF Futures (1–1)	Finals by surface Hard (6–9) Clay (8–12) Grass (0–0) Carpet (2–0)

Result	W–L	Date	Tournament	Tier	Surface	Partner	Opponents	Score
Loss	0–1	Sep 1996	Budva, Yugoslavia	Challenger	Clay	(Socialist Federal Republic of Yugoslavia) Nenad Zimonjić	(Socialist Federal Republic of Yugoslavia) Nebojsa Djordjevic (North Macedonia) Aleksandar Kitinov	3–6, 2–6
Win	1–1	Sep 1997	Budapest, Hungary	Challenger	Clay	(Socialist Federal Republic of Yugoslavia) Nebojsa Djordjevic	(Hungary) Kornél Bardóczky (Hungary) Miklós Jancsó	6–1, 3–6, 6–4
Loss	1–2	Sep 1997	Skopje, Macedonia	Challenger	Clay	(Socialist Federal Republic of Yugoslavia) Nebojsa Djordjevic	(Austria) Thomas Buchmayer (Austria) Thomas Strengberger	4–6, 6–7
Win	2–2	Feb 1998	Wolfsburg, Germany	Challenger	Carpet	(Russia) Marat Safin	(Germany) Jan-Ralph Brandt (Germany) Thomas Messmer	6–4, 4–6, 6–2
Loss	2–3	Apr 1998	Barletta, Italy	Challenger	Clay	(Austria) Thomas Strengberger	(Spain) Joan Balcells (Spain) Juan Ignacio Carrasco	6–7^{(4–7)}, 3–6
Loss	2–4	Jul 1998	Oberstaufen, Germany	Challenger	Clay	(Italy) Omar Camporese	(Portugal) Nuno Marques (Netherlands) Rogier Wassen	6–7, 6–7
Loss	2–5	Jul 1998	Newcastle, United Kingdom	Challenger	Clay	(Socialist Federal Republic of Yugoslavia) Nebojsa Djordjevic	(South Africa) Jeff Coetzee (Netherlands) Edwin Kempes	6–1, 6–7, 2–6
Win	3–5	Jun 1999	Weiden, Germany	Challenger	Clay	(Spain) Emilio Benfele Álvarez	(Sweden) Simon Aspelin (Sweden) Johan Landsberg	6–7, 6–2, 6–4
Loss	3–6	Sep 1999	Sofia, Bulgaria	Challenger	Clay	(Socialist Federal Republic of Yugoslavia) Nebojsa Djordjevic	(Italy) Massimo Ardinghi (Italy) Davide Sanguinetti	4–6, 2–6
Loss	3–7	Nov 1999	Buenos Aires, Argentina	Challenger	Clay	(South Africa) Paul Rosner	(Argentina) Guillermo Cañas (Argentina) Martín García	4–6, 4–6
Loss	3–8	Jul 2000	Tampere, Finland	Challenger	Clay	(Australia) Steven Randjelovic	(Finland) Ville Liukko (Finland) Jarkko Nieminen	0–6, 6–4, 3–6
Win	4–8	Aug 2000	Togliatti, Russia	Challenger	Hard	(Croatia) Lovro Zovko	(Romania) Ionuț Moldovan (Russia) Yuri Schukin	6–4, 6–4
Win	5–8	Nov 2000	Santiago, Chile	Challenger	Clay	(Georgia (country)) Irakli Labadze	(Spain) Joan Balcells (Spain) Germán Puentes-Alcaniz	6–3, 6–4
Loss	5–9	Feb 2001	Dallas, United States	Challenger	Hard	(Croatia) Lovro Zovko	(United States) Gavin Sontag (Canada) Jerry Turek	6–3, 5–7, 5–7
Win	6–9	Sep 2001	Aschaffenburg, Germany	Challenger	Clay	(North Macedonia) Aleksandar Kitinov	(Germany) Karsten Braasch (Germany) Franz Stauder	6–7^{(3–7)}, 6–4, 7–6^{(8–6)}
Loss	6–10	Nov 2001	Santiago, Chile	Challenger	Clay	(Brazil) Daniel Melo	(Brazil) André Sá (Brazil) Alexandre Simoni	6–3, 3–6, 6–7^{(3–7)}
Loss	6–11	Dec 2001	San Jose, Costa Rica	Challenger	Hard	(Brazil) Daniel Melo	(Israel) Jonathan Erlich (Israel) Andy Ram	3–6, 3–6
Win	7–11	Feb 2002	Belgrade, Serbia	Challenger	Carpet	(Croatia) Lovro Zovko	(Czech Republic) Jaroslav Levinský (Czech Republic) Tomáš Zíb	walkover
Win	8–11	Jun 2002	Weiden, Germany	Challenger	Clay	(Germany) Jens Knippschild	(Argentina) Sergio Roitman (Argentina) Andrés Schneiter	7–6^{(7–5)}, 6–2
Loss	8–12	Aug 2002	Córdoba, Spain	Challenger	Hard	(Spain) Emilio Benfele Álvarez	(South Africa) Paul Rosner (Czech Republic) Ota Fukárek	6–7^{(7–9)}, 4–6
Loss	8–13	Aug 2002	Manerbio, Italy	Challenger	Clay	(Australia) Anthony Ross	(Poland) Mariusz Fyrstenberg (Poland) Marcin Matkowski	4–6, 6–7^{(4–7)}
Loss	8–14	Oct 2002	San Antonio, United States	Challenger	Hard	(United States) Hugo Armando	(United States) Diego Ayala (United States) Robert Kendrick	2–6, 4–6
Loss	8-15	Feb 2003	USA F4, Brownsville	Futures	Hard	(North Macedonia) Lazar Magdinchev	(United States) Tripp Phillips (United States) Ryan Sachire	2–6, 1–6
Win	9–15	May 2005	Tunica Resorts, United States	Challenger	Clay	(United States) Michael Russell	(Argentina) Juan Pablo Brzezicki (Argentina) Juan Pablo Guzmán	7–6^{(7–4)}, 6–3
Loss	9–16	Feb 2006	Dallas, United States	Challenger	Hard	(United States) Mirko Pehar	(United States) Rajeev Ram (United States) Bobby Reynolds	3–6, 4–6
Win	10–16	Jan 2008	Miami, United States	Challenger	Clay	(Serbia) Ilija Bozoljac	(Netherlands Antilles) Jean-Julien Rojer (Brazil) Márcio Torres	7–5, 6–4
Win	11–16	Mar 2008	Sunrise, United States	Challenger	Hard	(Serbia) Janko Tipsarević	(Belgium) Kristof Vliegen (Netherlands) Peter Wessels	6–2, 7–6^{(7–5)}
Win	12–16	Apr 2008	Cremona, Italy	Challenger	Hard	(Argentina) Eduardo Schwank	(Romania) Florin Mergea (Romania) Horia Tecău	6–3, 6–2
Loss	12–17	May 2008	Dresden, Germany	Challenger	Clay	(Serbia) Ilija Bozoljac	(Germany) Daniel Brands (South Korea) Jun Woong-sun	6–2, 6–7^{(4–7)}, [6–10]
Loss	12–18	May 2008	Bordeaux, France	Challenger	Clay	(Poland) Tomasz Bednarek	(Argentina) Diego Hartfield (Argentina) Sergio Roitman	4–6, 4–6
Win	13–18	Sep 2008	Waco, United States	Challenger	Hard	(United States) Alex Bogomolov Jr.	(United States) Alberto Francis (United States) Nicholas Monroe	6–4, 5–7, [10–8]
Loss	13–19	Sep 2008	Lubbock, United States	Challenger	Hard	(United States) Alex Bogomolov Jr.	(Romania) Roman Borvanov (Russia) Artem Sitak	2–6, 3–6
Win	14–19	Oct 2008	Calabasas, United States	Challenger	Hard	(Serbia) Ilija Bozoljac	(Australia) Nathan Healey (India) Somdev Devvarman	1–6, 6–3, [13–11]
Loss	14–20	Nov 2008	Louisville, United States	Challenger	Hard	(Canada) Frank Dancevic	(India) Prakash Amritraj (United States) Jesse Levine	3–6, 6–7^{(10–12)}
Loss	14–21	Oct 2009	Tiburon, United States	Challenger	Hard	(Serbia) Ilija Bozoljac	(India) Harsh Mankad (Philippines) Treat Huey	4–6, 4–6
Win	15–21	Aug 2010	Istanbul, Turkey	Challenger	Hard	(Czech Republic) Leoš Friedl	(United States) Brian Battistone (Sweden) Andreas Siljeström	7–6^{(8–6)}, 7–6^{(7–3)}
Win	16–21	Jul 2011	Serbia F3, Belgrade	Futures	Clay	(Serbia) Boris Conkic	(Ukraine) Vadim Alekseenko (Serbia) Petar Djukic	6–4, 4–6, [10–5]

== Performance timelines ==
Key
W	F	SF	QF	#R	RR	Q#	DNQ	A	NH

(W) winner; (F) finalist; (SF) semifinalist; (QF) quarterfinalist; (#R) rounds 4, 3, 2, 1; (RR) round-robin stage; (Q#) qualification round; (DNQ) did not qualify; (A) absent; (NH) not held; (SR) strike rate (events won / competed); (W–L) win–loss record.

=== Singles ===
Tournament	1998	1999	2000	2001	2002	2003	2004	2005	2006	2007	2008	2009	2010	2011	SR	W–L	Win%
Grand Slam tournaments
Australian Open	Q1	A	Q3	A	A	A	A	A	A	A	A	Q1	A	A	0 / 0	0–0	–
French Open	Q1	A	A	A	A	A	Q1	Q1	Q1	1R	Q2	A	A	A	0 / 1	0–1	0%
Wimbledon	Q1	A	Q2	A	A	A	Q1	Q1	Q2	Q2	Q1	A	A	A	0 / 0	0–0	–
US Open	A	A	Q1	A	A	Q1	Q1	Q1	A	Q2	Q1	A	A	A	0 / 0	0–0	–
Win–loss	0–0	0–0	0–0	0–0	0–0	0–0	0–0	0–0	0–0	0–1	0–0	0–0	0–0	0–0	0 / 1	0–1	0%
ATP World Tour Masters 1000
Indian Wells	A	A	A	A	A	A	Q1	A	A	Q2	1R	Q1	A	Q1	0 / 1	0–1	0%
Miami	A	A	A	A	A	A	A	A	A	A	Q2	A	A	A	0 / 0	0–0	–
Monte Carlo	Q2	A	A	A	A	A	A	A	A	A	A	A	A	A	0 / 0	0–0	–
Rome	1R	A	A	A	A	A	A	A	A	A	A	A	A	A	0 / 1	0–1	0%
Madrid	Not Held				A	A	A	A	A	A	A	Q2	A	A	0 / 0	0–0	–
Win–loss	0–1	0–0	0–0	0–0	0–0	0–0	0–0	0–0	0–0	0–0	0–1	0–0	0–0	0–0	0 / 2	0–2	0%

=== Doubles ===
Tournament	1998	1999	2000	2001	2002	2003	2004	2005	2006	2007	2008	2009	2010	2011	SR	W–L	Win%
Grand Slam tournaments
Australian Open	A	A	2R	A	A	A	A	A	A	A	A	1R	SF	1R	0 / 4	5–4	56%
French Open	A	A	1R	A	A	A	A	A	A	A	SF	2R	2R	A	0 / 4	6–4	60%
Wimbledon	Q1	A	1R	A	A	A	A	A	3R	A	1R	1R	1R	A	0 / 5	2–5	29%
US Open	A	Q1	Q1	A	1R	A	A	A	A	A	QF	2R	1R	A	0 / 4	4–4	50%
Win–loss	0–0	0–0	1–3	0–0	0–1	0–0	0–0	0–0	2–1	0–0	7–3	2–4	5–4	0–1	0 / 17	17–17	50%
Olympic Games
Summer Olympics	NH		1R	Not Held			A	NH			A	NH			0 / 1	0–1	0%
ATP World Tour Masters 1000
Indian Wells	A	A	A	A	A	A	A	A	A	A	A	1R	QF	A	0 / 2	2–2	50%
Miami	A	A	A	A	A	A	A	A	A	A	A	2R	1R	A	0 / 2	1–2	33%
Monte Carlo	1R	A	A	A	A	A	A	A	A	A	A	A	A	A	0 / 1	0–1	0%
Rome	1R	A	A	A	A	A	A	A	A	A	A	2R	A	A	0 / 2	1–2	33%
Madrid	Not Held				A	A	A	A	A	A	A	QF	1R	A	0 / 2	2–2	50%
Canada	A	A	A	A	A	A	A	A	A	A	A	1R	A	A	0 / 1	0–1	0%
Win–loss	0–2	0–0	0–0	0–0	0–0	0–0	0–0	0–0	0–0	0–0	0–0	4–5	2–3	0–0	0 / 10	6–10	38%

=== Mixed doubles ===
Tournament	2000	2001	2002	2003	2004	2005	2006	2007	2008	2009	2010	SR	W–L	Win%
Grand Slam tournaments
Australian Open	A	A	A	A	A	A	A	A	A	2R	A	0 / 1	1–1	50%
French Open	A	A	A	A	A	A	A	A	A	2R	A	0 / 1	1–1	50%
Wimbledon	3R	A	A	A	A	A	A	A	2R	1R	1R	0 / 4	3–4	43%
US Open	A	A	A	A	A	A	A	A	QF	2R	A	0 / 2	3–2	60%
Win–loss	2–1	0–0	0–0	0–0	0–0	0–0	0–0	0–0	3–2	3–4	0–1	0 / 8	8–8	50%

== Awards ==
1995

- Best Male Tennis Player in FR Yugoslavia

1997

- Best Male Tennis Player in FR Yugoslavia
