= 2011 Volkswagen Challenger =

Tennis tournament

- Date: 21–27 February 2011
- Edition: 18th
- Location: Wolfsburg, Germany

Champions

Singles
- (Belgium) Ruben Bemelmans

Doubles
- (Germany) Matthias Bachinger / (Germany) Simon Stadler
- Volkswagen Challenger

The 2011 Volkswagen Challenger was a professional tennis tournament played on carpet. It was the 18th edition of the tournament which was part of the 2011 ATP Challenger Tour. It took place in Wolfsburg, Germany between 21 and 27 February 2011.

== ATP entrants ==
=== Seeds ===
Country	Player	Rank^{1}	Seed
GER	Daniel Brands	78	1
LUX	Gilles Müller	90	2
BEL	Olivier Rochus	108	3
NED	Jesse Huta Galung	112	4
BEL	Steve Darcis	125	5
GER	Andreas Beck	131	6
RUS	Alexander Kudryavtsev	141	7
SRB	Ilija Bozoljac	145	8

- Rankings are as of February 14, 2011.

=== Other entrants ===
The following players received wildcards into the singles main draw:

- (Russia) Victor Baluda
- (Germany) Jaan-Frederik Brunken
- (Germany) Peter Gojowczyk
- (Chinese Taipei) Jimmy Wang

The following players received entry from the qualifying draw:

- (Germany) Andre Begemann
- (Uzbekistan) Farrukh Dustov
- (Germany) Dieter Kindlmann
- (Germany) Stefan Seifert

== Champions ==
=== Singles ===
(Belgium) Ruben Bemelmans def. (Germany) Dominik Meffert, 6–7(8), 6–4, 6–4

=== Doubles ===
(Germany) Matthias Bachinger / (Germany) Simon Stadler def. (Germany) Dominik Meffert / (Denmark) Frederik Nielsen, 3–6, 7–6(3), [10–7]
