= 2009 Volkswagen Challenger =

- Date: February 23 – February 29
- Edition: 17th
- Location: Wolfsburg, Germany

Champions

Singles
- (Belgium) Ruben Bemelmans

Doubles
- (United States) Travis Rettenmaier / (United Kingdom) Ken Skupski
- Volkswagen Challenger

The 2009 Volkswagen Challenger was a professional tennis tournament played on indoor carpet courts and was part of the 2009 ATP Challenger Tour. It took place at the Tennisclub Grün-Gold in Wolfsburg, Germany, from 23 to 29 February 2009.

== Singles main-draw entrants ==
=== Seeds ===
| Country | Player | ATP ranking (as of 16 Feb 2009) | Seed |
|---|---|---|---|
| SRB | Ilija Bozoljac | 138 | 1 |
| GER | Simon Stadler | 141 | 2 |
| GER | Daniel Brands | 142 | 3 |
| ROU | Adrian Cruciat | 173 | 4 |
| CZE | Lukáš Rosol | 175 | 5 |
| GBR | Alex Bogdanovic | 187 | 6 |
| RUS | Alexander Kudryavtsev | 196 | 7 |
| ITA | Andrea Stoppini | 204 | 8 |

- Rankings are as of 16 February 2009.

=== Other entrants ===
The following players received wildcards into the singles main draw:

- (Germany) Richard Becker
- (Germany) Jaan-Frédérik Brunken
- (Germany) Florian Mayer
- (Republic of Ireland) Louk Sorensen

Players who entered via the qualifying draw:

- (Belgium) Ruben Bemelmans
- (Jamaica) Dustin Brown
- (Canada) Pierre-Ludovic Duclos
- (Uzbekistan) Farrukh Dustov

== Champions ==
=== Men's singles ===
(Belgium) Ruben Bemelmans defeated (Italy) Stefano Galvani 7–6(5), 3–6, 6–3 in the final.

=== Men's doubles ===
(United States) Travis Rettenmaier / (United Kingdom) Ken Skupski defeated (Ukraine) Sergei Bubka / (Russia) Alexander Kudryavtsev 6–3, 6–4 in the final.
