= Volkswagen Challenger =

Defunct tennis tournament
- Event name: Volkswagen Challenger
- Founded: 1993
- Abolished: 2012
- Editions: 19
- Location: Wolfsburg, Germany
- Venue: Tennisclub Grün-Gold; Wolfsburg
- Category: ATP Challenger Tour
- Surface: Carpet (indoor)
- Draw: 32S/29Q/16D
- Website: Official Website

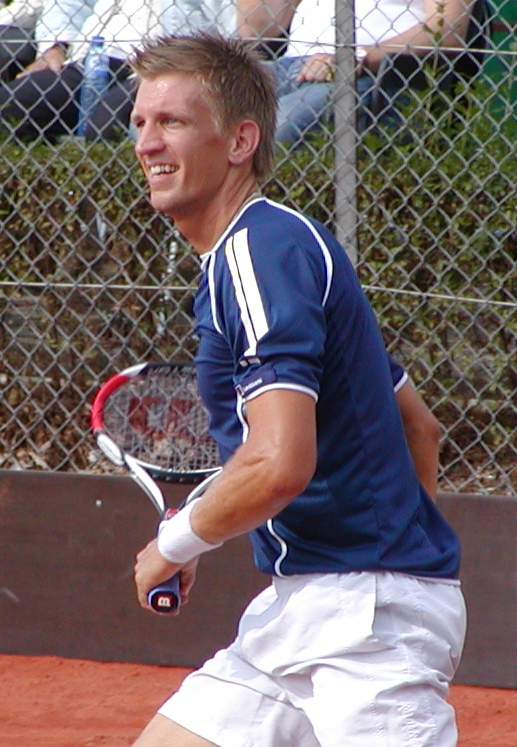
Finn player Jarkko Nieminen took the singles title in 2001

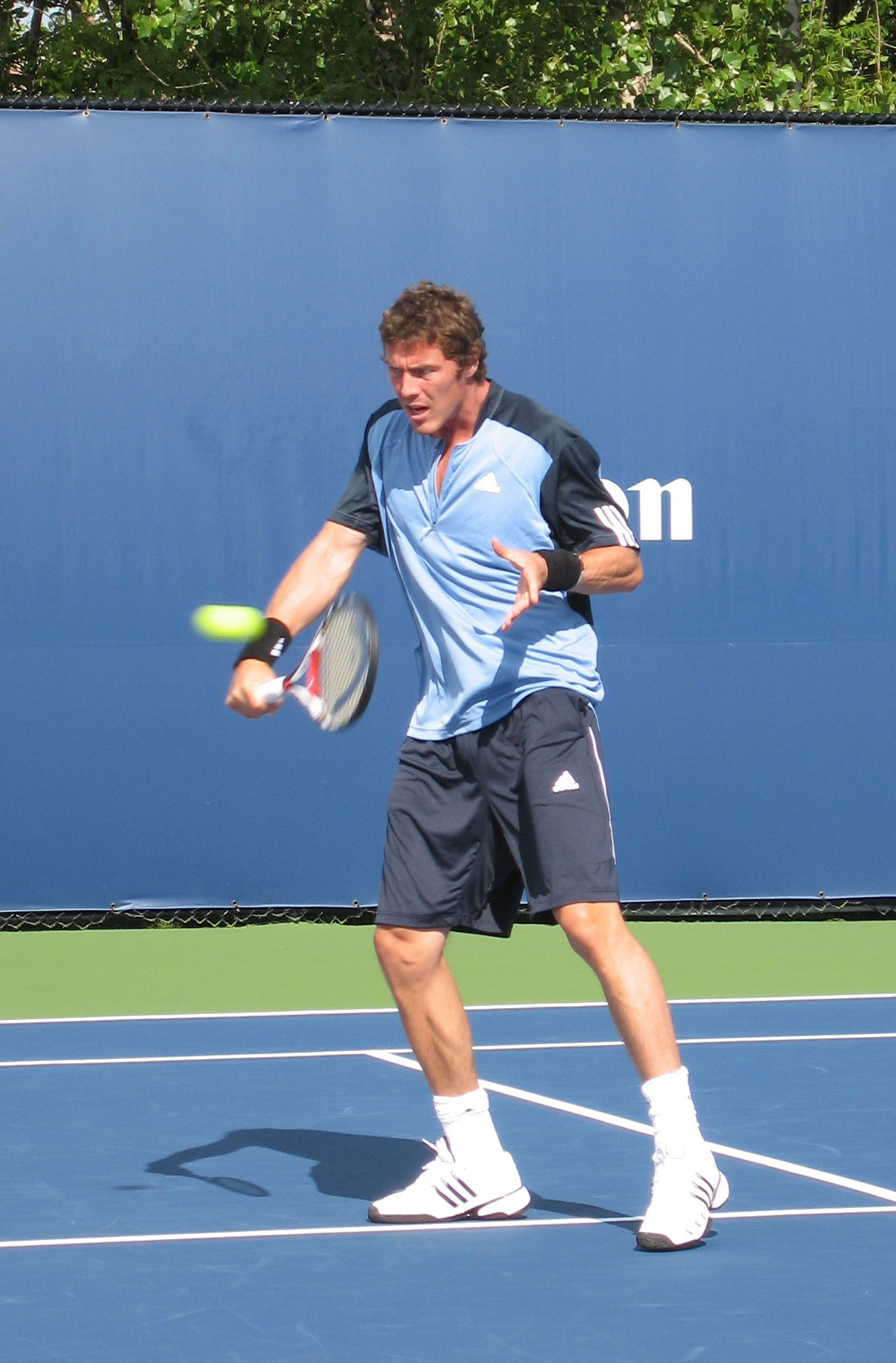
Russian Marat Safin partnered with Dušan Vemić in 1998 to win the doubles

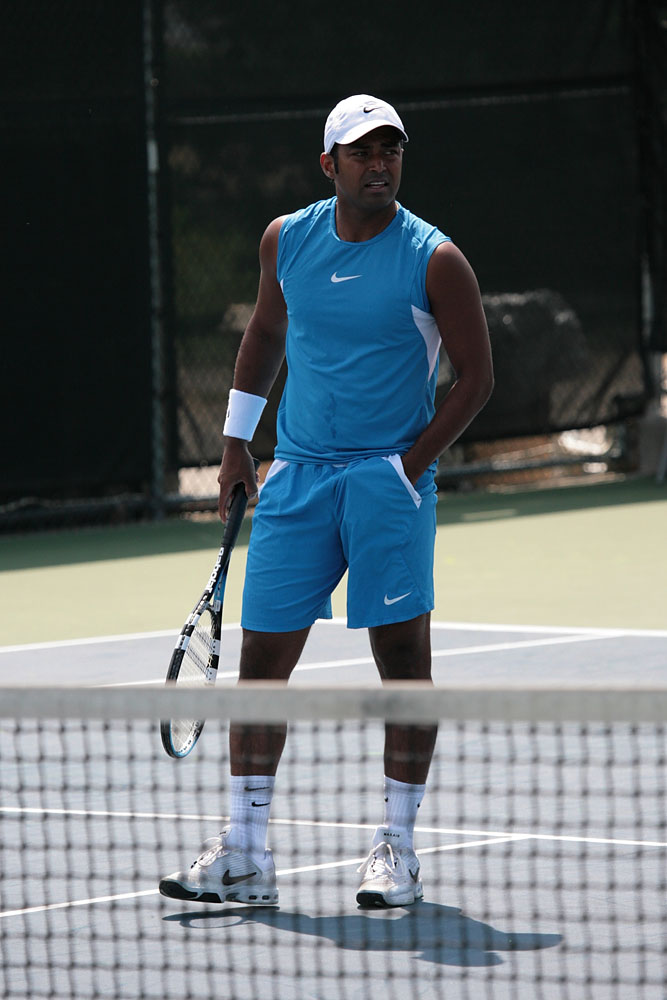
Former World No. 1 in doubles Leander Paes from India won the first edition of the doubles event, alongside Donald Johnson

The Volkswagen Challenger was a professional tennis tournament played on indoor carpet courts. It was part of the ATP Challenger Tour. It was held annually at the Tennisclub Grün-Gold Wolfsburg in Wolfsburg, Germany, between 1993 and 2012.

Many players won two titles, Axel Pretzsch Ruben Bemelmans in singles Robert Lindstedt, Jean-Claude Scherrer and Martin Sinner in doubles. But only Axel Pretzsch won both titles simultaneously.

== Past finals ==
=== Singles ===
Year	Champion	Runner-up	Score
2012	(Netherlands) Igor Sijsling	(Poland) Jerzy Janowicz	4–6, 6–3, 7–6^{(11–9)}
2011	(Belgium) Ruben Bemelmans (2)	(Germany) Dominik Meffert	6–7(8), 6–4, 6–4
2010	Not held		
2009	(Belgium) Ruben Bemelmans (1)	(Italy) Stefano Galvani	7–6(5), 3–6, 6–3
2008	(Republic of Ireland) Louk Sorensen	(Uzbekistan) Farrukh Dustov	7–6(7), 4–6, 6–4
2007	(Netherlands) Robin Haase	(Germany) Daniel Brands	6–2, 3–6, 6–1
2006	(Germany) Alexander Waske	(Chinese Taipei) Yeu-tzuoo Wang	6–2, 6–4
2005	(Germany) Dieter Kindlmann	(Germany) Tobias Summerer	7–5, 4–1 retired
2004	(Czech Republic) Michal Tabara	(Germany) Florian Mayer	6–4, 6–3
2003	(Germany) Axel Pretzsch (2)	(United Kingdom) Arvind Parmar	6–7(1), 7–6(5), 6–4
2002	(Germany) Jakub Záhlava	(Belgium) Dick Norman	6–4, 6–2
2001	(Finland) Jarkko Nieminen	(Germany) Andy Fahlke	3–6, 6–2, 7–5
2000	(Russia) Andrei Stoliarov	(Spain) Óscar Burrieza López	3–6, 6–3, 6–0
1999	(Germany) Axel Pretzsch (1)	(Italy) Diego Nargiso	walkover
1998	(Switzerland) Ivo Heuberger	(Germany) Dirk Dier	6–7, 6–4, 6–4
1997	(Germany) Jens Knippschild	(Germany) Arne Thoms	6–4, 6–3
1996	(Italy) Gianluca Pozzi	(Sweden) Thomas Johansson	4–6, 7–6, 7–6
1995	(Germany) David Prinosil	(Germany) Martin Sinner	6–4, 7–6
1994	(Germany) Alexander Mronz	(Canada) Albert Chang	6–3, 7–5
1993	(Italy) Cristiano Caratti	(Germany) Lars Koslowski	6–7, 6–1, 6–2

=== Doubles ===
Year	Champions	Runners-up	Score
2012	(Lithuania) Laurynas Grigelis (Belarus) Uladzimir Ignatik	(Poland) Tomasz Bednarek (France) Olivier Charroin	7–5, 4–6, [10–5]
2011	(Germany) Matthias Bachinger (Germany) Simon Stadler	(Germany) Dominik Meffert (Denmark) Frederik Nielsen	3–6, 7–6(3), [10–7]
2010	Not held		
2009	(United States) Travis Rettenmaier (United Kingdom) Ken Skupski	(Ukraine) Sergey Bubka (Russia) Alexander Kudryavtsev	6–3, 6–4
2008	(Australia) Carsten Ball (South Africa) Izak van der Merwe	(United Kingdom) Richard Bloomfield (United Kingdom) Ken Skupski	7–6(5), 6–3
2007	(Austria) Alexander Peya (Germany) Lars Uebel	(United Kingdom) Joshua Goodall (Czech Republic) Jan Mertl	6–4, 6–4
2006	(Switzerland) Jean-Claude Scherrer (2) (Italy) Uros Vico	(Germany) Frank Moser (Germany) Sebastian Rieschick	7–6(3), 6–7(5), 10–8
2005	(Germany) Philipp Petzschner (Austria) Alexander Peya	(Pakistan) Aisam-ul-Haq Qureshi (Croatia) Lovro Zovko	6–2, 6–4
2004	(Sweden) Robert Lindstedt (2) (Switzerland) Jean-Claude Scherrer (1)	(Spain) Juan Ignacio Carrasco (Brazil) Josh Goffi	6–2, 4–6, 7–6(5)
2003	(Germany) Karsten Braasch (Germany) Axel Pretzsch	(Austria) Alexander Peya (Pakistan) Aisam-ul-Haq Qureshi	6–4, 6–2
2002	(Czech Republic) Jan Hernych (South Africa) Shaun Rudman	(Italy) Filippo Messori (Italy) Gianluca Pozzi	7–6(3), 6–7(3), 6–3
2001	(Sweden) Robert Lindstedt (1) (Sweden) Fredrik Lovén	(Germany) Jan Boruszewski (Germany) Markus Menzler	7–6(5), 6–7(7), 6–4
2000	(Germany) Jan-Ralph Brandt (Germany) Martin Sinner (2)	(Czech Republic) Tomáš Cibulec (Czech Republic) Leoš Friedl	7–5, 3–6, 7–6
1999	(Brazil) Adriano Ferreira (Venezuela) Maurice Ruah	(Germany) Karsten Braasch (Germany) Dirk Dier	walkover
1998	(Russia) Marat Safin (Federal Republic of Yugoslavia) Dušan Vemić	(Germany) Jan-Ralph Brandt (Germany) Thomas Messmer	6–4, 4–6, 6–2
1997	(Italy) Nicola Bruno (Italy) Laurence Tieleman	(Sweden) Henrik Holm (Sweden) Nils Holm	7–6, 6–4
1996	(Germany) Dirk Dier (Germany) Arne Thoms	(United States) Jim Pugh (Netherlands) Joost Winnink	6–4, 6–4
1995	(Germany) Martin Sinner (1) (Netherlands) Joost Winnink	(Germany) Dirk Dier (Germany) Lars Koslowski	7–5, 6–3
1994	(United States) Rich Benson (Malaysia) Adam Malik	(Australia) Wayne Arthurs (Australia) Simon Youl	7–6, 6–4
1993	(United States) Donald Johnson (India) Leander Paes	(Sweden) Jan Apell (Denmark) Michael Mortensen	7–6, 6–1
