= 2005 Campbell's Hall of Fame Tennis Championships – Singles =

Singles
- 2005 Campbell's Hall of Fame Tennis Championships

Final
- Champion: (United Kingdom) Greg Rusedski
- Runner-up: (United States) Vincent Spadea
- Score: 7–6^{(7–3)}, 2–6, 6–4

Details
- Draw: 32
- Seeds: 8

Events
Singles	Doubles
← 2004 ·	Hall of Fame Open	· 2006 →

Greg Rusedski was the defending champion. Rusedski successfully defended his title, beating Vincent Spadea in the final, 7–6^{(7–3)}, 2–6, 6–4.

== Seeds ==
1. (United States) Taylor Dent (second round)
2. (United States) Vincent Spadea (final)
3. (United Kingdom) Greg Rusedski (champion)
4. (France) Cyril Saulnier (first round)
5. (United States) Robby Ginepri (second round)
6. (Germany) Lars Burgsmüller (first round, retired due to a leg injury)
7. (United States) Paul Goldstein (semifinals)
8. (United States) James Blake (first round)

== Draw ==
=== Key ===
- Q = Qualifier
- WC = Wild card
- LL = Lucky loser
- Alt = Alternate
- ITF = ITF entry
- PR = Protected ranking
- SR = Special ranking
- SE = Special exempt
- JE = Junior exempt
- JR = Junior Accelerator Programme entrant
- CO = College Accelerator Programme entrant
- NG = Next Gen Accelerator Program entrant
- w/o = Walkover
- r = Retired
- d = Defaulted

=== Finals ===
Semifinals
(South Africa) Wesley Moodie	6^{2}	4
3	(United Kingdom) Greg Rusedski	7^{7}	6
7	(United States) Paul Goldstein	6^{6}	2
2	(United States) Vincent Spadea	7^{8}	6

Final
3	(United Kingdom) Greg Rusedski	7^{7}	2	6
2	(United States) Vincent Spadea	6^{3}	6	4

=== Top half ===
First round
1	(United States) T Dent	7^{7}	6
(United States) A Delic	6^{3}	4
(South Africa) W Moodie	6	6
(Chinese Taipei) Y-t Wang	4	4
(Slovakia) M Mertiňák	6	6^{4}	6
(United States) B Reynolds	4	7^{7}	3
WC	(United States) S Oudsema	2	7^{8}	0
5	(United States) R Ginepri	6	6^{6}	6
3	(United Kingdom) G Rusedski	2	6	6
Q	(Italy) U Vico	6	4	4
(Canada) F Dancevic	4	6	3
(Czech Republic) R Vik	6	1	6
WC	(United Kingdom) A Murray	6	7
(France) G Carraz	4	5
(France) A Dupuis	6	6
8	(United States) J Blake	2	4

Second round
1	(United States) T Dent	4	1
(South Africa) W Moodie	6	6
(Slovakia) M Mertiňák	6	6
5	(United States) R Ginepri	3	4
3	(United Kingdom) G Rusedski	6	7^{7}
(Czech Republic) R Vik	2	6^{5}
WC	(United Kingdom) A Murray	4	1
(France) A Dupuis	6	6

Quarterfinals
(South Africa) W Moodie	6	6
(Slovakia) M Mertiňák	4	3
3	(United Kingdom) G Rusedski	7^{7}	6
(France) A Dupuis	6^{3}	4

Semifinals
(South Africa) W Moodie	6^{2}	4
3	(United Kingdom) G Rusedski	7^{7}	6

=== Bottom half ===
First round
7	(United States) P Goldstein	6	1	6
(Belgium) D Norman	3	6	3
Q	(Romania) F Mergea	6	6
Q	(United States) B Wilson	2	2
(Germany) A Waske	7^{7}	4	6
(Belgium) G Elseneer	6^{5}	6	4
(Italy) D Bracciali	7	6
4/WC	(France) C Saulnier	5	3
6	(Germany) L Burgsmüller	6^{3}	1^{r}
(Ecuador) G Lapentti	7^{7}	3
(United States) A Bogomolov Jr.	2	3
Q	(Serbia and Montenegro) D Vemić	6	6
(United States) J Morrison	6^{8}	6^{1}
(Slovakia) K Kučera	7^{10}	7^{7}
(Germany) A Popp	6	3	2
2	(United States) V Spadea	4	6	6

Second round
7	(United States) P Goldstein	6	6
Q	(Romania) F Mergea	1	3
(Germany) A Waske	7^{9}	7^{8}
(Italy) D Bracciali	6^{7}	6^{6}
(Ecuador) G Lapentti	7^{7}	5	2^{r}
Q	(Serbia and Montenegro) D Vemić	6^{5}	7	3
(Slovakia) K Kučera	1	4
2	(United States) V Spadea	6	6

Quarterfinals
7	(United States) P Goldstein	6	3	7^{7}
(Germany) A Waske	3	6	6^{5}
Q	(Serbia and Montenegro) D Vemić	3	4
2	(United States) V Spadea	6	6

Semifinals
7	(United States) P Goldstein	6^{6}	2
2	(United States) V Spadea	7^{8}	6
