= 2002 Wimbledon Championships – Men's singles qualifying =

Men's singles qualifying
- 2002 Wimbledon Championships

Events
Singles	men	women		boys	girls
Doubles	men	women	mixed	boys	girls
WC Singles	men	women	quad
WC Doubles	men	women	quad
Legends	men	women	seniors

Qualification
Singles	men	women
Doubles	men	women
- Wimbledon Championships

Players and pairs who neither have high enough rankings nor receive wild cards may participate in a qualifying tournament held one week before the annual Wimbledon Tennis Championships.

== Seeds ==
1. (United States) Jeff Morrison (qualifying competition, lucky loser)
2. (Austria) Jürgen Melzer (qualified)
3. (Japan) Takao Suzuki (first round)
4. (South Korea) Lee Hyung-taik (qualified)
5. (United States) Robby Ginepri (second round)
6. (Czech Republic) Ota Fukárek (first round)
7. (Germany) Axel Pretzsch (second round)
8. (Russia) Yuri Schukin (first round)
9. (United States) Jack Brasington (qualified)
10. (Brazil) Ricardo Mello (second round)
11. (United States) Brian Vahaly (qualifying competition, lucky loser)
12. (Switzerland) George Bastl (qualifying competition, lucky loser)
13. (Belgium) Dick Norman (first round)
14. (United States) Mardy Fish (first round)
15. (Czech Republic) Radek Štěpánek (qualified)
16. (Russia) Denis Golovanov (qualifying competition, lucky loser)
17. (United States) Justin Gimelstob (qualifying competition)
18. (Croatia) Mario Ančić (qualified)
19. (France) Sébastien de Chaunac (first round)
20. (Germany) Alexander Waske (qualified)
21. (Romania) Gabriel Trifu (first round)
22. (Brazil) Daniel Melo (first round)
23. (France) Cyril Saulnier (qualified)
24. (Israel) Noam Behr (first round)
25. (Belarus) Vladimir Voltchkov (first round)
26. (Zimbabwe) Wayne Black (second round)
27. (France) Jean-François Bachelot (qualified)
28. (Spain) Didac Pérez (second round)
29. (Belgium) Gilles Elseneer (qualifying competition)
30. (United States) Jeff Salzenstein (first round)
31. (France) Grégory Carraz (qualified)
32. (Italy) Federico Luzzi (second round)

== Qualifiers ==
1. (France) Cyril Saulnier
2. (Austria) Jürgen Melzer
3. (Italy) Cristiano Caratti
4. (South Korea) Lee Hyung-taik
5. (France) Nicolas Thomann
6. (Slovakia) Karol Beck
7. (Argentina) Juan Pablo Guzmán
8. (Australia) Scott Draper
9. (United States) Jack Brasington
10. (Greece) Konstantinos Economidis
11. (France) Jean-François Bachelot
12. (Germany) Alexander Waske
13. (Croatia) Mario Ančić
14. (South Africa) Justin Bower
15. (Czech Republic) Radek Štěpánek
16. (France) Grégory Carraz

== Lucky losers ==
1. (United States) Jeff Morrison
2. (United States) Brian Vahaly
3. (Switzerland) George Bastl
4. (Russia) Denis Golovanov

== Qualifying draw ==
=== First qualifier ===
First round
1	(United States) Jeff Morrison	7^{7}	6
WC	(United Kingdom) James Fox	6^{3}	4
WC	(United Kingdom) Simon Dickson	3	6	6
WC	(United Kingdom) Lee Childs	6	1	4
(Australia) Jaymon Crabb	6	6
(Italy) Leonardo Azzaro	3	4
(Slovakia) Ladislav Švarc	6^{4}	4
23	(France) Cyril Saulnier	7^{7}	6

Second round
1	(United States) Jeff Morrison	6	5	7
WC	(United Kingdom) Simon Dickson	2	7	5
(Australia) Jaymon Crabb	3	4
23	(France) Cyril Saulnier	6	6

Qualifying competition
1	(United States) Jeff Morrison	3	4	1
23	(France) Cyril Saulnier	6	6	6

=== Second qualifier ===
First round
2	(Austria) Jürgen Melzer	7^{7}	7
(South Africa) Rik de Voest	6^{5}	5
(France) Marc Gicquel	6	3	6
WC	(United Kingdom) Luke Milligan	3	6	2
(Federal Republic of Yugoslavia) Nenad Zimonjić	7^{7}	4	4
(United States) Levar Harper-Griffith	6^{3}	6	6
(Israel) Amir Hadad	6	6
22	(Brazil) Daniel Melo	2	4

Second round
2	(Austria) Jürgen Melzer	6	6
(France) Marc Gicquel	0	3
(United States) Levar Harper-Griffith	7^{7}	3	6
(Israel) Amir Hadad	6^{0}	6	4

Qualifying competition
2	(Austria) Jürgen Melzer	6	6^{7}	6	6
(United States) Levar Harper-Griffith	3	7^{9}	3	3

=== Third qualifier ===
First round
3	(Japan) Takao Suzuki	5	6^{4}
(Italy) Cristiano Caratti	7	7^{7}
(France) Benjamin Cassaigne	6	1	5
(Italy) Stefano Pescosolido	4	6	7
(Pakistan) Aisam-ul-Haq Qureshi	7	7^{11}
(Croatia) Ivo Karlović	5	6^{9}
(United States) Robert Kendrick	6	7
30	(United States) Jeff Salzenstein	3	5

Second round
(Italy) Cristiano Caratti	6	7^{7}
(Italy) Stefano Pescosolido	2	6^{3}
(Pakistan) Aisam-ul-Haq Qureshi	7^{8}	2	6
(United States) Robert Kendrick	6^{6}	6	3

Qualifying competition
(Italy) Cristiano Caratti	6	6^{2}	7^{8}	6
(Pakistan) Aisam-ul-Haq Qureshi	3	7^{7}	6^{6}	4

=== Fourth qualifier ===
First round
4	(South Korea) Lee Hyung-taik	6	7^{8}
(Czech Republic) Petr Dezort	0	6^{6}
(France) Julien Varlet	6^{2}	6	6
(South Africa) Louis Vosloo	7^{7}	3	2
(Argentina) Ignacio Hirigoyen	5	7^{7}	8
(Mexico) Alejandro Hernández	7	6^{4}	6
WC	(Canada) Daniel Nestor	6	6
21	(Romania) Gabriel Trifu	2	1

Second round
4	(South Korea) Lee Hyung-taik	6	5	7
(France) Julien Varlet	4	7	5
(Argentina) Ignacio Hirigoyen	4	6^{4}
WC	(Canada) Daniel Nestor	6	7^{7}

Qualifying competition
4	(South Korea) Lee Hyung-taik	6	7	6
WC	(Canada) Daniel Nestor	3	5	4

=== Fifth qualifier ===
First round
5	(United States) Robby Ginepri	6	6
(Argentina) Sebastián Prieto	1	1
(France) Nicolas Thomann	6	7^{7}
(Australia) Peter Luczak	2	6^{4}
(Russia) Artem Derepasko	6	6
(Argentina) Mariano Delfino	3	1
WC	(United Kingdom) Jonathan Marray	6	5	3
17	(United States) Justin Gimelstob	2	7	6

Second round
5	(United States) Robby Ginepri	3	3
(France) Nicolas Thomann	6	6
(Russia) Artem Derepasko	5	3
17	(United States) Justin Gimelstob	7	6

Qualifying competition
(France) Nicolas Thomann	6	4	5	6	14
17	(United States) Justin Gimelstob	4	6	7	3	12

=== Sixth qualifier ===
First round
6	(Czech Republic) Ota Fukárek	7^{7}	4	4
(Slovakia) Karol Beck	6^{5}	6	6
(Netherlands) Melvyn op der Heijde	6	7^{7}
WC	(United Kingdom) Justin Layne	4	6^{3}
(United States) Bob Bryan	6	7^{7}
(Italy) Potito Starace	4	6^{1}
(Germany) David Prinosil	6	6
19	(France) Sébastien de Chaunac	1	4

Second round
(Slovakia) Karol Beck	6	6
(Netherlands) Melvyn op der Heijde	1	2
(United States) Bob Bryan	7^{7}	6
(Germany) David Prinosil	6^{3}	3

Qualifying competition
(Slovakia) Karol Beck	7	6	6
(United States) Bob Bryan	5	4	4

=== Seventh qualifier ===
First round
7	(Germany) Axel Pretzsch	7^{8}	6
(Slovenia) Marko Tkalec	6^{6}	2
(Italy) Laurence Tieleman	3	6	6
(Argentina) Juan Pablo Guzmán	6	2	8
(Netherlands) Rogier Wassen	6^{2}	7	4
(Norway) Jan Frode Andersen	7^{7}	5	0^{r}
(Peru) Iván Miranda	3	3
26	(Zimbabwe) Wayne Black	6	6

Second round
7	(Germany) Axel Pretzsch	4	4
(Argentina) Juan Pablo Guzmán	6	6
(Netherlands) Rogier Wassen	6	7
26	(Zimbabwe) Wayne Black	4	5

Qualifying competition
(Argentina) Juan Pablo Guzmán	7^{7}	6	6
(Netherlands) Rogier Wassen	6^{3}	4	4

=== Eighth qualifier ===
First round
8	(Russia) Yuri Schukin	6	6^{3}	1
(Argentina) Diego Veronelli	2	7^{7}	6
(United States) Eric Taino	4	6	6
(Spain) Salvador Navarro	6	3	1
(Australia) Scott Draper	6	6
(Brazil) Júlio Silva	3	3
(Japan) Gouichi Motomura	3	6	6
24	(Israel) Noam Behr	6	2	3

Second round
(Argentina) Diego Veronelli	6	3	6
(United States) Eric Taino	4	6	4
(Australia) Scott Draper	6	6
(Japan) Gouichi Motomura	2	4

Qualifying competition
(Argentina) Diego Veronelli	3	4	4
(Australia) Scott Draper	6	6	6

=== Ninth qualifier ===
First round
9	(United States) Jack Brasington	6	6
(Canada) Frédéric Niemeyer	4	1
(Czech Republic) Jaroslav Levinský	6	3	4
(Czech Republic) Jan Hernych	3	6	6
(France) Slimane Saoudi	5	4
(Italy) Gianluca Pozzi	7	6
(Brazil) Thiago Alves	6	2	3
28	(Spain) Didac Pérez	4	6	6

Second round
9	(United States) Jack Brasington	6	6
(Czech Republic) Jan Hernych	2	4
(Italy) Gianluca Pozzi	6	6
28	(Spain) Didac Pérez	3	3

Qualifying competition
9	(United States) Jack Brasington	7	6^{2}	6	7
(Italy) Gianluca Pozzi	5	7^{7}	4	5

=== Tenth qualifier ===
First round
10	(Brazil) Ricardo Mello	6	6
(Austria) Alexander Peya	2	0
(United States) Michael Joyce	0	6	4
(France) Jean-Baptiste Perlant	6	2	6
WC	(United Kingdom) Andrew Banks	6	6
(Argentina) Roberto Álvarez	3	3
(Greece) Konstantinos Economidis	6	2	6
25	(Belarus) Vladimir Voltchkov	3	6	3

Second round
10	(Brazil) Ricardo Mello	3	4
(France) Jean-Baptiste Perlant	6	6
WC	(United Kingdom) Andrew Banks	2	6^{4}
(Greece) Konstantinos Economidis	6	7^{7}

Qualifying competition
(France) Jean-Baptiste Perlant	6	2	3	4
(Greece) Konstantinos Economidis	3	6	6	6

=== Eleventh qualifier ===
First round
11	(United States) Brian Vahaly	6	6^{9}	6
(Switzerland) Marco Chiudinelli	4	7^{11}	1
(Ecuador) Giovanni Lapentti	3^{r}
(Chinese Taipei) Wang Yeu-tzuoo	2
(France) Dimitri Lorin	6	5	3
(Spain) Quino Muñoz	4	7	6
(Romania) Răzvan Sabău	6^{4}	3
27	(France) Jean-François Bachelot	7^{7}	6

Second round
11	(United States) Brian Vahaly	1	6	7
(Chinese Taipei) Wang Yeu-tzuoo	6	3	5
(Spain) Quino Muñoz	3	2
27	(France) Jean-François Bachelot	6	6

Qualifying competition
11	(United States) Brian Vahaly	6^{11}	6	4	1
27	(France) Jean-François Bachelot	7^{13}	3	6	6

=== Twelfth qualifier ===
First round
12	(Switzerland) George Bastl	6	3	6
(France) Stéphane Huet	3	6	1
(Croatia) Lovro Zovko	4	7^{7}	2
(Russia) Igor Kunitsyn	6	6^{3}	6
WC	(United Kingdom) Mark Hilton	4	3
(Argentina) Sergio Roitman	6	6
(Austria) Oliver Marach	1	5
20	(Germany) Alexander Waske	6	7

Second round
12	(Switzerland) George Bastl	7^{7}	7
(Russia) Igor Kunitsyn	6^{3}	5
(Argentina) Sergio Roitman	4	7^{8}	3
20	(Germany) Alexander Waske	6	6^{6}	6

Qualifying competition
12	(Switzerland) George Bastl	4	4	6^{3}
20	(Germany) Alexander Waske	6	6	7^{7}

=== Thirteenth qualifier ===
First round
13	(Belgium) Dick Norman	3	6	3
(Zimbabwe) Byron Black	6	3	6
(Israel) Eyal Erlich	4	6	3
(Australia) Todd Larkham	6	3	6
(Slovakia) Ján Krošlák	2	3
(Germany) Christian Vinck	6	6
(Sweden) Kalle Flygt	6	3	3
18	(Croatia) Mario Ančić	4	6	6

Second round
(Zimbabwe) Byron Black	6	7^{7}
(Australia) Todd Larkham	3	6^{3}
(Germany) Christian Vinck	4	6	4
18	(Croatia) Mario Ančić	6	3	6

Qualifying competition
(Zimbabwe) Byron Black	3	2	4
18	(Croatia) Mario Ančić	6	6	6

=== Fourteenth qualifier ===
First round
14	(United States) Mardy Fish	4	5
(South Africa) Justin Bower	6	7
(France) Florent Serra	7^{8}	6
(Spain) Mariano Albert-Ferrando	6^{6}	3
(Sweden) Björn Rehnquist	7	7^{7}
(United States) Kevin Kim	5	6^{5}
(Germany) Jakub Záhlava	6	2	4
29	(Belgium) Gilles Elseneer	3	6	6

Second round
(South Africa) Justin Bower	7	6
(France) Florent Serra	5	2
(Sweden) Björn Rehnquist	1	0
29	(Belgium) Gilles Elseneer	6	6

Qualifying competition
(South Africa) Justin Bower	6	3	7^{7}	6
29	(Belgium) Gilles Elseneer	4	6	6^{5}	3

=== Fifteenth qualifier ===
First round
15	(Czech Republic) Radek Štěpánek	7^{7}	6
(France) Olivier Patience	6^{4}	2
(Germany) Jan Weinzierl	6^{3}	4
(Finland) Tuomas Ketola	7^{7}	6
(France) Thomas Dupré	3	6	1
(United States) Kristian Capalik	6	3	6
(Sweden) Daniel Andersson	3	2
32	(Italy) Federico Luzzi	6	6

Second round
15	(Czech Republic) Radek Štěpánek	6	6
(Finland) Tuomas Ketola	4	4
(United States) Kristian Capalik	7^{7}	6
32	(Italy) Federico Luzzi	6^{3}	2

Qualifying competition
15	(Czech Republic) Radek Štěpánek	6	6	6
(United States) Kristian Capalik	3	4	3

=== Sixteenth qualifier ===
First round
16	(Russia) Denis Golovanov	6	6
(Chile) Hermes Gamonal	3	1
(Sweden) Johan Settergren	3	6	6
(Spain) Iván Navarro Pastor	6	3	1
(Austria) Werner Eschauer	3	7	0
(Czech Republic) Tomáš Zíb	6	5	6
(Italy) Filippo Messori	5	3
31	(France) Grégory Carraz	7	6

Second round
16	(Russia) Denis Golovanov	6	6
(Sweden) Johan Settergren	1	3
(Czech Republic) Tomáš Zíb	6^{2}	3
31	(France) Grégory Carraz	7^{7}	6

Qualifying competition
16	(Russia) Denis Golovanov	4	3	1
31	(France) Grégory Carraz	6	6	6
