= 2004 Hall of Fame Tennis Championships – Doubles =

Doubles
- 2004 Hall of Fame Tennis Championships

Final
- Champions: (Australia) Jordan Kerr (United States) Jim Thomas
- Runners-up: (France) Grégory Carraz (France) Nicolas Mahut
- Score: 6–3, 6–7^{(5–7)}, 6–3

Details
- Draw: 16 (2WC)
- Seeds: 4

Events
Singles	Doubles
- Hall of Fame Open

Jordan Kerr and David Macpherson were the defending champions, but Macpherson did not compete this year, as he was already retired from professional tennis.

Kerr teamed up with Jim Thomas and successfully defended his title, by defeating Grégory Carraz and Nicolas Mahut 6–3, 6–7^{(5–7)}, 6–3 in the final.

== Seeds ==
1. (United States) Rick Leach / (United States) Brian MacPhie (first round)
2. (Austria) Jürgen Melzer / (The Bahamas) Mark Merklein (semifinals)
3. (Australia) Jordan Kerr / (United States) Jim Thomas (champions)
4. (United States) Graydon Oliver / (United States) Travis Parrott (first round)

== Draw ==
Key

- Q = Qualifier
- WC = Wild card
- LL = Lucky loser
- Alt = Alternate
- ITF = ITF entry
- PR = Protected ranking
- SR = Special ranking
- SE = Special exempt
- JE = Junior exempt
- JR = Junior Accelerator Programme entrant
- CO = College Accelerator Programme entrant
- NG = Next Gen Accelerator Program entrant
- w/o = Walkover
- r = Retired
- d = Defaulted

=== Draw ===
First round
1	(United States) R Leach (United States) B MacPhie	6	6^{8}	3
(Israel) H Levy (United States) T Phillips	3	7^{10}	6
(United States) D Ayala (United States) D Bowen	6^{11}	2
(Australia) A Fisher (Australia) S Huss	7^{13}	6
4	(United States) G Oliver (United States) T Parrott	7^{7}	6^{6}	4
(France) G Carraz (France) N Mahut	6^{5}	7^{8}	6
WC	(United States) JM Gambill (United States) Torrey Gambill	1	4
(Belgium) G Elseneer (United States) J Salzenstein	6	6
(United States) B Coupe (United States) J Gimelstob	6	6
(France) A Dupuis (France) C Saulnier	3	3
(United States) S Humphries (United States) J Morrison	4	6^{9}
3	(Australia) J Kerr (United States) J Thomas	6	7^{11}
WC	(United States) J Blake (United States) T Blake	4	6	6
(Austria) A Peya (Germany) A Popp	6	3	2
(South Africa) R de Voest (South Africa) W Moodie	4	4
2	(Austria) J Melzer (The Bahamas) M Merklein	6	6

Quarterfinals
(Israel) H Levy (United States) T Phillips	4	5
(Australia) A Fisher (Australia) S Huss	6	7
(France) G Carraz (France) N Mahut	6	6
(Belgium) G Elseneer (United States) J Salzenstein	0	2
(United States) B Coupe (United States) J Gimelstob
3	(Australia) J Kerr (United States) J Thomas	w/o
WC	(United States) J Blake (United States) T Blake
2	(Austria) J Melzer (The Bahamas) M Merklein	w/o

Semifinals
(Australia) A Fisher (Australia) S Huss	6^{4}	6^{3}
(France) G Carraz (France) N Mahut	7^{7}	7^{7}
3	(Australia) J Kerr (United States) J Thomas	4	7^{7}	6
2	(Austria) J Melzer (The Bahamas) M Merklein	6	6^{5}	4

Final
(France) G Carraz (France) N Mahut	3	7^{7}	3
3	(Australia) J Kerr (United States) J Thomas	6	6^{5}	6
