= 2004 Hall of Fame Tennis Championships – Singles =

Singles
- 2004 Hall of Fame Tennis Championships

Final
- Champion: (United Kingdom) Greg Rusedski
- Runner-up: (Germany) Alexander Popp
- Score: 7–6^{(7–5)}, 7–6^{(7–2)}

Details
- Draw: 32 (3WC/4Q/1LL)
- Seeds: 8

Events
Singles	Doubles
- Hall of Fame Open

Robby Ginepri was the defending champion, but did not participate.

Greg Rusedski won the title, defeating Alexander Popp 7–6^{(7–5)}, 7–6^{(7–2)} in the final.

== Seeds ==
1. (United States) Vince Spadea (quarterfinals)
2. (United States) James Blake (second round)
3. (Austria) Jürgen Melzer (quarterfinals)
4. (France) Grégory Carraz (first round)
5. (France) Cyril Saulnier (semifinals)
6. (United States) Jan-Michael Gambill (first round)
7. (Germany) Alexander Popp (final)
8. (France) Antony Dupuis (semifinals)

== Draw ==
Key

- Q = Qualifier
- WC = Wild card
- LL = Lucky loser
- Alt = Alternate
- ITF = ITF entry
- PR = Protected ranking
- SR = Special ranking
- SE = Special exempt
- JE = Junior exempt
- JR = Junior Accelerator Programme entrant
- CO = College Accelerator Programme entrant
- NG = Next Gen Accelerator Program entrant
- w/o = Walkover
- r = Retired
- d = Defaulted

=== Finals ===
Semifinals
7	(Germany) Alexander Popp	6	7^{7}
5	(France) Cyril Saulnier	4	6^{5}
(United Kingdom) Greg Rusedski	7	7^{12}
8	(France) Antony Dupuis	5	6^{10}

Final
7	(Germany) Alexander Popp	6^{5}	6^{2}
(United Kingdom) Greg Rusedski	7^{7}	7^{7}

=== Top half ===
First round
1	(United States) V Spadea	6	4	6
(United States) J Salzenstein	3	6	3
WC	(United States) B Vahaly	6	6
Q	(Slovakia) M Mertiňák	2	2
Q	(United States) G Weiner	7^{7}	6
(Austria) A Peya	6^{4}	4
WC	(United States) A Delić	4	3
7	(Germany) A Popp	6	6
3	(Austria) J Melzer	6	6
(Czech Republic) J Hernych	2	4
(France) N Mahut	6	6
(France) J Golmard	2	2
(Belgium) G Elseneer	6	6
Q	(United States) R Ram	2	3
WC	(United States) J Gimelstob	1	6	1
5	(France) C Saulnier	6	3	6

Second round
1	(United States) V Spadea	6	7^{7}
WC	(United States) B Vahaly	1	6^{5}
Q	(United States) G Weiner	1	3
7	(Germany) A Popp	6	6
3	(Austria) J Melzer	6	6
(France) N Mahut	3	1
(Belgium) G Elseneer	7	3	6^{3}
5	(France) C Saulnier	5	6	7^{7}

Quarterfinals
1	(United States) V Spadea	2	2
7	(Germany) A Popp	6	6
3	(Austria) J Melzer	1	5
5	(France) C Saulnier	6	7

Semifinals
7	(Germany) A Popp	6	7^{7}
5	(France) C Saulnier	4	6^{5}

=== Bottom half ===
First round
6	(United States) J-M Gambill	2	7^{7}	3
(United States) J Morrison	6	6^{5}	6
(South Africa) W Moodie	2	7^{7}	6^{2}
Q	(United States) B Baker	6	6^{4}	7^{7}
(Denmark) K Carlsen	6	2	7^{7}
(Australia) T Reid	1	6	6^{4}
(United Kingdom) G Rusedski	6	4	6
4	(France) G Carraz	1	6	3
8	(France) A Dupuis	6	6
(Czech Republic) J Vacek	2	3
LL	(United States) R Kendrick	6	2	3
(Italy) D Sanguinetti	3	6	6
(Israel) H Levy	3	3
(United States) A Bogomolov Jr.	6	6
(Belgium) D Norman	6^{7}	3
2	(United States) J Blake	7^{9}	6

Second round
(United States) J Morrison	6	6
Q	(United States) B Baker	3	3
(Denmark) K Carlsen	6	6^{5}	6^{6}
(United Kingdom) G Rusedski	4	7^{7}	7^{8}
8	(France) A Dupuis	6	6
(Italy) D Sanguinetti	3	4
(United States) A Bogomolov Jr.	6	6
2	(United States) J Blake	3	1

Quarterfinals
(United States) J Morrison	6^{5}	5
(United Kingdom) G Rusedski	7^{7}	7
8	(France) A Dupuis	6	2	6
(United States) A Bogomolov Jr.	4	6	3

Semifinals
(United Kingdom) G Rusedski	7	7^{12}
8	(France) A Dupuis	5	6^{10}

== Qualifying ==
=== Qualifying seeds ===
1. (United States) Glenn Weiner (qualified)
2. (United States) Robert Kendrick (qualifying competition, lucky loser)
3. (Philippines) Eric Taino (first round)
4. (Canada) Frédéric Niemeyer (first round)
5. (Canada) Frank Dancevic (qualifying competition)
6. (Slovakia) Michal Mertiňák (qualified)
7. (Serbia and Montenegro) Dušan Vemić (first round)
8. (South Africa) Rik de Voest (first round)

=== Qualifiers ===
1. (United States) Glenn Weiner
2. (United States) Brian Baker
3. (United States) Rajeev Ram
4. (Slovakia) Michal Mertiňák

=== Lucky loser ===
1. (United States) Robert Kendrick

=== Qualifying draw ===
==== First qualifier ====
First round
1	(United States) Glenn Weiner	6^{3}	6	6
(United States) Zack Fleishman	7^{7}	2	2
WC	(United States) Justin Slattery	6	4	4
WC	(United States) Jamie Gresh	4	6	6
(Australia) Rameez Junaid	4	2
(Jamaica) Dustin Brown	6	6
(Japan) Toshihide Matsui	6	1	2
5	(Canada) Frank Dancevic	2	6	6

Second round
1	(United States) Glenn Weiner	7	6
WC	(United States) Jamie Gresh	5	4
(Jamaica) Dustin Brown	3	2
5	(Canada) Frank Dancevic	6	6

Qualifying competition
1	(United States) Glenn Weiner	5	7^{7}	7
5	(Canada) Frank Dancevic	7	6^{2}	5

==== Second qualifier ====
First round
2	(United States) Robert Kendrick	5	6	6
(Australia) Jaymon Crabb	7	1	2
(Australia) Marc Kimmich	3	6	7
(United States) Andres Pedroso	6	3	5
(Slovenia) Luka Gregorc	7	6^{5}	6
(United States) Alex Witt	5	7^{7}	4
(United States) Brian Baker	7	6
8	(South Africa) Rik de Voest	5	4

Second round
2	(United States) Robert Kendrick	4	7^{7}	6
(Australia) Marc Kimmich	6	6^{5}	4
(Slovenia) Luka Gregorc	2	0^{r}
(United States) Brian Baker	6	1

Qualifying competition
2	(United States) Robert Kendrick	1	6	3
(United States) Brian Baker	6	3	6

==== Third qualifier ====
First round
3	(Philippines) Eric Taino	6	6^{2}	4
(United States) Rajeev Ram	4	7^{7}	6
(United States) Diego Ayala	7^{8}	6^{3}	3
(United States) David Martin	6^{6}	7^{7}	6
(United States) Huntley Montgomery	6^{5}	5
(United States) K. J. Hippensteel	7^{7}	7
(United States) Thomas Blake	3	7	7^{7}
7	(Serbia and Montenegro) Dušan Vemić	6	5	6^{2}

Second round
(United States) Rajeev Ram	6	6
(United States) David Martin	4	4
(United States) K. J. Hippensteel	6	7^{12}
(United States) Thomas Blake	4	6^{10}

Qualifying competition
(United States) Rajeev Ram	7^{7}	6
(United States) K. J. Hippensteel	6^{2}	3

==== Fourth qualifier ====
First round
4	(Canada) Frédéric Niemeyer	7^{7}	5	2
(United States) Travis Rettenmaier	6^{5}	7	6
(Chile) Juan Ignacio Cerda	6	7
WC	(United States) Zach Dailey	2	5
(United States) Travis Parrott	6	6
WC	(United States) James Cerretani	4	2
(United States) Scott Lipsky	3	3
6	(Slovakia) Michal Mertiňák	6	6

Second round
(United States) Travis Rettenmaier	6	7
(Chile) Juan Ignacio Cerda	3	5
(United States) Travis Parrott	6^{5}	3
6	(Slovakia) Michal Mertiňák	7^{7}	6

Qualifying competition
(United States) Travis Rettenmaier	4	6^{2}
6	(Slovakia) Michal Mertiňák	6	7^{7}
