= 2006 Campbell's Hall of Fame Tennis Championships – Doubles =

Doubles
- 2006 Campbell's Hall of Fame Tennis Championships

Final
- Champions: (United States) Robert Kendrick (Austria) Jürgen Melzer
- Runners-up: (South Africa) Jeff Coetzee (United States) Justin Gimelstob
- Score: 7–6^{(7–3)}, 6–0

Events
Singles	Doubles
← 2005 ·	Campbell's Hall of Fame Tennis Championships	· 2007 →

Jordan Kerr and Jim Thomas were the defending champions, but lost in the first round this year.

Robert Kendrick and Jürgen Melzer won in the final 7–6^{(7–3)}, 6–0, against Jeff Coetzee and Justin Gimelstob.

== Seeds ==
1. (Australia) Wayne Arthurs / (Australia) Stephen Huss (first round)
2. (Australia) Jordan Kerr / (United States) Jim Thomas (first round)
3. (South Africa) Jeff Coetzee / (United States) Justin Gimelstob (final)
4. (United States) Tripp Phillips / (United States) Bobby Reynolds (quarterfinals, withdrew)

== Draw ==
=== Key ===
- Q = Qualifier
- WC = Wild card
- LL = Lucky loser
- Alt = Alternate
- SE = Special exempt
- PR = Protected ranking
- ITF = ITF entry
- JE = Junior exempt
- w/o = Walkover
- r = Retired
- d = Defaulted
- SR = Special ranking

=== Draw ===
First round
1	(Australia) W Arthurs (Australia) S Huss	4	4
(United Kingdom) J Auckland (Germany) L Burgsmüller	6	6
(Australia) A Fisher (Australia) N Healey	6	6
WC	(United States) S Oudsema (United States) P Simmonds	4	4
4	(United States) T Phillips (United States) B Reynolds	3	7^{7}	[11]
(United States) T Parrott (France) C Saulnier	6	6^{5}	[9]
(United States) H Montgomery (United States) R Ram	4	1
WC	(United States) R Kendrick (Austria) J Melzer	6	6
(Russia) I Kunitsyn (Thailand) D Udomchoke	3	6	[10]
(United Kingdom) A Murray (United Kingdom) J Murray	6	3	[7]
(United States) E Butorac (United States) C Drake	4	4
3	(South Africa) J Coetzee (United States) J Gimelstob	6	6
(Denmark) K Carlsen (Denmark) K Pless	7^{7}	6^{5}	[9]
(Croatia) I Karlović (United States) M Pehar	6^{3}	7^{7}	[11]
(South Africa) R de Voest (Poland) Ł Kubot	6	3	[10]
2	(Australia) J Kerr (United States) J Thomas	4	6	[4]

Quarterfinals
(United Kingdom) J Auckland (Germany) L Burgsmüller	3	6^{3}
(Australia) A Fisher (Australia) N Healey	6	7^{7}
4	(United States) T Phillips (United States) B Reynolds
WC	(United States) R Kendrick (Austria) J Melzer	w/o
(Russia) I Kunitsyn (Thailand) D Udomchoke	1	2
3	(South Africa) J Coetzee (United States) J Gimelstob	6	6
(Croatia) I Karlović (United States) M Pehar
(South Africa) R de Voest (Poland) Ł Kubot	w/o

Semifinals
(Australia) A Fisher (Australia) N Healey	6^{5}	4
WC	(United States) R Kendrick (Austria) J Melzer	7^{7}	6
3	(South Africa) J Coetzee (United States) J Gimelstob	6	6
(South Africa) R de Voest (Poland) Ł Kubot	4	4

Final
WC	(United States) R Kendrick (Austria) J Melzer	7^{7}	6
3	(South Africa) J Coetzee (United States) J Gimelstob	6^{3}	0
