= 2009 Internationaux du Doubs – Open de Franche-Comté – Singles =

Open de Franche-Comté – Singles
- 2009 Internationaux du Doubs – Open de Franche-Comté

Final
- Champion: (Belgium) Kristof Vliegen
- Runner-up: (Germany) Andreas Beck
- Score: 6–2, 6–7(6), 6–3

Events
Singles	Doubles
← 2008 ·	Internationaux du Doubs – Open de Franche-Comté

Marc Gicquel was the defending champion; however, he didn't take part in these championships this year.
Kristof Vliegen defeated 6–2, 6–7(6), 6–3 Andreas Beck in the final.

== Seeds ==
1. (Portugal) Frederico Gil (second round)
2. (Germany) Andreas Beck (final)
3. (Uzbekistan) Denis Istomin (second round)
4. (Belgium) Kristof Vliegen (champion)
5. (Germany) Michael Berrer (quarterfinals)
6. (Belgium) Olivier Rochus (first round)
7. (France) Nicolas Mahut (withdrew)
8. (France) Adrian Mannarino (first round)

== Draw ==
=== Key ===
- Q = Qualifier
- WC = Wild card
- LL = Lucky loser
- Alt = Alternate
- SE = Special exempt
- PR = Protected ranking
- ITF = ITF entry
- JE = Junior exempt
- w/o = Walkover
- r = Retired
- d = Defaulted
- SR = Special ranking

=== Final four ===
Semifinals
(Kazakhstan) Mikhail Kukushkin	4	5
4	(Belgium) Kristof Vliegen	6	7
(France) Josselin Ouanna	7	4	6^{6}
2	(Germany) Andreas Beck	5	6	7

Final
4	(Belgium) Kristof Vliegen	6	6^{6}	6
2	(Germany) Andreas Beck	2	7	3

=== Top half ===
First round
1	(Portugal) F Gil	6	6
(Slovakia) K Beck	4	4
(Kazakhstan) Y Schukin	1	7	6^{2}
(Switzerland) S Bohli	6	6^{6}	7
(Kazakhstan) M Kukushkin	6	7
(Czech Republic) P Šnobel	2	6^{4}
Q	(Poland) M Przysiężny	6^{8}	4
LL	(France) J-C Faurel	7	6
4	(Belgium) K Vliegen	6	6^{8}	6
(United States) S Warburg	3	7	1
(Germany) B Dorsch	2	1
Q	(Austria) P Oswald	6	6
WC	(France) Nicolas Guillaume	4	4
(Russia) M Elgin	6	6
(Denmark) K Pless	3	r
5	(Germany) M Berrer	4

Second round
1	(Portugal) F Gil	6	6^{2}	4
(Switzerland) S Bohli	4	7	6
(Kazakhstan) M Kukushkin	6	6
LL	(France) J-C Faurel	3	3
4	(Belgium) K Vliegen	6	7
Q	(Austria) P Oswald	4	6^{2}
(Russia) M Elgin	2	5
5	(Germany) M Berrer	6	7

Quarterfinals
(Switzerland) S Bohli	4	0	r
(Kazakhstan) M Kukushkin	6	1
4	(Belgium) K Vliegen	6	6
5	(Germany) M Berrer	4	4

Semifinals
(Kazakhstan) M Kukushkin	4	5
4	(Belgium) K Vliegen	6	7

=== Bottom half ===
First round
8	(France) A Mannarino	3	4
(France) T Ascione	6	6
Q	(France) N Renavand	7	3	6^{4}
(France) J Ouanna	6^{6}	6	7
(France) É Roger-Vasselin	5	6	6
WC	(France) J Jeanpierre	7	3	4
WC	(Bulgaria) G Dimitrov	6	2	6^{3}
3	(Uzbekistan) D Istomin	3	6	7
6	(Belgium) O Rochus	6^{1}	7	3
(United States) B Evans	7	6^{4}	6
(France) A Sidorenko	7	6
Q	(Ukraine) I Marchenko	6^{3}	2
WC	(France) B Paire	6	6^{5}	6^{1}
(Sweden) J Johansson	4	7	7
(France) M Montcourt	4	6	1
2	(Germany) A Beck	6	1	6

Second round
(France) T Ascione	4	6	4
(France) J Ouanna	6	4	6
(France) É Roger-Vasselin	7	6
3	(Uzbekistan) D Istomin	6^{4}	2
(United States) B Evans	6	5	6^{3}
(France) A Sidorenko	4	7	7
(Sweden) J Johansson	w/o
2	(Germany) A Beck

Quarterfinals
(France) J Ouanna	6	3	7
(France) É Roger-Vasselin	4	6	6^{5}
(France) A Sidorenko	6^{1}	3
2	(Germany) A Beck	7	6

Semifinals
(France) J Ouanna	7	4	6^{6}
2	(Germany) A Beck	5	6	7
