= 2003 Miller Lite Hall of Fame Championships =

Tennis tournament

- Date: July 7–13
- Edition: 28th
- Category: International Series
- Draw: 32S / 16D
- Prize money: $355,000
- Surface: Grass / outdoors
- Location: Newport, Rhode Island, U.S.

Champions

Singles
- (United States) Robby Ginepri

Doubles
- (Australia) Jordan Kerr / (Australia) David Macpherson
← 2002 ·	Hall of Fame Open	· 2004 →

The 2003 Miller Lite Hall of Fame Championships was a tennis tournament played on grass courts at the International Tennis Hall of Fame in Newport, Rhode Island in the United States and was part of the International Series of the 2003 ATP Tour. The tournament ran from July 7 through July 13, 2003.

== Finals ==
=== Singles ===
(United States) Robby Ginepri defeated (Austria) Jürgen Melzer 6–4, 6–7^{(3–7)}, 6–1

- It was Ginepri's only title of the year and the 1st of his career.

=== Doubles ===
(Australia) Jordan Kerr / (Australia) David Macpherson defeated (Austria) Julian Knowle / (Austria) Jürgen Melzer 7–6^{(7–4)}, 6–3

- It was Kerr's only title of the year and the 1st of his career. It was Macpherson's only title of the year and the 16th of his career.
