= 2002 Miller Lite Hall of Fame Championships – Singles =

Singles
- 2002 Miller Lite Hall of Fame Championships
- 2001 Champion: (South Africa) Neville Godwin

Final
- Champion: (United States) Taylor Dent
- Runner-up: (United States) James Blake
- Score: 6–1, 4–6, 6–4

Details
- Draw: 32
- Seeds: 8

Events
Singles	Doubles
- Hall of Fame Open

Neville Godwin was the defending champion but lost in the first round to Jeff Morrison.

Taylor Dent won in the final 6–1, 4–6, 6–4 against James Blake.

== Seeds ==
A champion seed is indicated in bold text while text in italics indicates the round in which that seed was eliminated.

1. (United States) James Blake (final)
2. (Australia) Wayne Arthurs (first round)
3. (Austria) Julian Knowle (second round)
4. (United States) Jeff Morrison (second round)
5. (Germany) Alexander Popp (quarterfinals)
6. (United States) Cecil Mamiit (first round)
7. (France) Michaël Llodra (semifinals)
8. (Austria) Jürgen Melzer (first round)

== Draw ==
Key

- Q = Qualifier
- WC = Wild card
- LL = Lucky loser
- Alt = Alternate
- ITF = ITF entry
- PR = Protected ranking
- SR = Special ranking
- SE = Special exempt
- JE = Junior exempt
- JR = Junior Accelerator Programme entrant
- CO = College Accelerator Programme entrant
- NG = Next Gen Accelerator Program entrant
- w/o = Walkover
- r = Retired
- d = Defaulted

First round
1	(United States) **J Blake**	**6**	**7**
(Romania) G Trifu	4	5
(Argentina) E Massa	4	4
(Czech Republic) **O Fukárek**	**6**	**6**
(United States) **J Gimelstob**	**6**	0	**6**
Q	(Australia) B Ellwood	2	**6**	3
Q	(Israel) **J Erlich**	**7**	**6**
8	(Austria) J Melzer	5	4
3	(Austria) **J Knowle**	**6**	**6**
(Argentina) M Vassallo Argüello	2	2
Q	(Switzerland) Y Allegro	3	6^{5}
(United States) **M Fish**	**6**	**7^{7}**
(Belgium) D Norman	4	**6**	4
WC	(United States) **B Vahaly**	**6**	3	**6**
(United Kingdom) J Delgado	**7**	5	3
7	(France) **M Llodra**	5	**7**	**6**
5	(Germany) **A Popp**	**6**	**6**
(Germany) A Pretzsch	2	2
(Germany) **M Kohlmann**	**6**	**6**
(Brazil) A Simoni	2	2
(United States) **T Dent**	**6**	**6**
WC	(Croatia) M Ančić	3	4
(South Africa) N Godwin	3	6^{7}
4	(United States) **J Morrison**	**6**	**7^{9}**
6	(United States) C Mamiit	4	4
(United States) **R Ginepri**	**6**	**6**
Q	(Australia) A Kennedy	2	6^{1}
(Israel) **N Okun**	**6**	**7^{7}**
(United States) A Kim	**7**	4	5
WC	(United States) **T Blake**	5	**6**	**7**
(United Kingdom) **M Lee**	3	**7**	**6**
2	(Australia) W Arthurs	**6**	5	2

Second round
1	(United States) **J Blake**	**7^{7}**	4	**6**
(Czech Republic) O Fukárek	6^{3}	**6**	1
(United States) **J Gimelstob**	**6**	**6**
Q	(Israel) J Erlich	4	0
3	(Austria) J Knowle	6^{5}	4
(United States) **M Fish**	**7^{7}**	**6**
WC	(United States) B Vahaly	4	3
7	(France) **M Llodra**	**6**	**6**
5	(Germany) **A Popp**	1	**7**	**6**
(Germany) M Kohlmann	**6**	5	4
(United States) **T Dent**	**6**	**6**
4	(United States) J Morrison	3	4
(United States) **R Ginepri**	**7^{8}**	1	**6**
(Israel) N Okun	6^{6}	**6**	2
WC	(United States) T Blake	**6**	4	2
(United Kingdom) **M Lee**	1	**6**	**6**

Quarterfinals
1	(United States) **J Blake**	**7**	**7**
(United States) J Gimelstob	5	5
(United States) M Fish	4	**6**	1
7	(France) **M Llodra**	**6**	1	**6**
5	(Germany) A Popp	3	2
(United States) **T Dent**	**6**	**6**
(United States) **R Ginepri**	**6**	**6**
(United Kingdom) M Lee	3	1

Semifinals
1	(United States) **J Blake**	**6**	3	**7**
7	(France) M Llodra	4	**6**	5
(United States) **T Dent**	3	**6**	**6**
(United States) R Ginepri	**6**	3	1

Final
1	(United States) James Blake	1	**6**	4
(United States) **Taylor Dent**	**6**	4	**6**
