= 2003 Miller Lite Hall of Fame Championships – Singles =

Singles
- 2003 Miller Lite Hall of Fame Championships
- 2002 Champion: (United States) Taylor Dent

Final
- Champion: (United States) Robby Ginepri
- Runner-up: (Austria) Jürgen Melzer
- Score: 6–4, 6–7^{(3–7)}, 6–1

Details
- Draw: 32
- Seeds: 8

Events
Singles	Doubles
- Hall of Fame Open

Taylor Dent was the defending champion but did not compete that year.

Robby Ginepri won in the final 6–4, 6–7^{(3–7)}, 6–1 against Jürgen Melzer.

== Seeds ==
A champion seed is indicated in bold text while text in italics indicates the round in which that seed was eliminated.

1. (United States) James Blake (first round)
2. n/a
3. (United States) Mardy Fish (first round)
4. (United States) **Robby Ginepri (champion)**
5. (Netherlands) Raemon Sluiter (first round)
6. (United States) Brian Vahaly (first round)
7. (United States) Justin Gimelstob (quarterfinals)
8. (Austria) Jürgen Melzer (final)

== Draw ==
Key

- Q = Qualifier
- WC = Wild card
- LL = Lucky loser
- Alt = Alternate
- ITF = ITF entry
- PR = Protected ranking
- SR = Special ranking
- SE = Special exempt
- JE = Junior exempt
- JR = Junior Accelerator Programme entrant
- CO = College Accelerator Programme entrant
- NG = Next Gen Accelerator Program entrant
- w/o = Walkover
- r = Retired
- d = Defaulted

=== Tournament ===
First round
1	(United States) J Blake	6^{4}	**7**	4
(France) **G Carraz**	**7^{7}**	5	**6**
WC	(Australia) **C Guccione**	**7^{7}**	**7^{7}**
(Italy) S Pescosolido	6^{2}	6^{4}
(Sweden) J Johansson	3	4
Q	(United States) **Z Fleishman**	**6**	**6**
(United States) J Morrison	4	**6**	6^{13}
7	(United States) **J Gimelstob**	**6**	4	**7^{15}**
4	(United States) **R Ginepri**	**6**	**6**
WC	(India) P Amritraj	1	4
(Netherlands) **D van Scheppingen**	**6**
(Germany) A Waske	2	r
(Russia) **A Stoliarov**	**6**	**6**
(United States) R Kendrick	2	4
(Peru) **I Miranda**	**7^{8}**	**6**
6	(United States) B Vahaly	6^{6}	3
5	(Netherlands) R Sluiter	3	2	r
(Australia) **S Draper**	**6**	**3**
(France) **C Saulnier**	**6**	**6**
(Switzerland) I Heuberger	3	1
Q	(Jamaica) D Brown	**7^{7}**	3	4
WC	(United States) **B Bryan**	6^{5}	**6**	**6**
Q	(Serbia and Montenegro) **D Vemić**	**7^{7}**	**7**
3	(United States) M Fish	6^{3}	5
8	(Austria) **J Melzer**	**6**	6^{3}	**6**
(France) N Thomann	3	**7^{7}**	4
(United States) C Mamiit	4	2
(Austria) **J Knowle**	**6**	**6**
(United States) **A Kim**	**7**	**6**
Q	(Japan) T Shimada	5	3
(Switzerland) G Bastl	1	3
LL	(United States) **J Salzenstein**	**6**	**6**

Second round
(France) **G Carraz**	6^{5}	**7^{7}**	**6**
WC	(Australia) C Guccione	**7^{7}**	6^{5}	4
Q	(United States) Z Fleishman	**6**	3	3
7	(United States) **J Gimelstob**	1	**6**	**6**
4	(United States) **R Ginepri**	**6**	**7^{7}**
(Netherlands) D van Scheppingen	4	6^{3}
(Russia) A Stoliarov	6^{3}	1
(Peru) **I Miranda**	**7^{7}**	**6**
(Australia) S Draper	2	3
(France) **C Saulnier**	**6**	**6**
WC	(United States) **B Bryan**	**6**	**6**
Q	(Serbia and Montenegro) D Vemić	4	2
8	(Austria) **J Melzer**	**6**	5	**6**
(Austria) J Knowle	3	**7**	4
(United States) A Kim	1	**7**	3
LL	(United States) **J Salzenstein**	**6**	5	**6**

Quarterfinals
(France) **G Carraz**	2	**6**	**7^{7}**
7	(United States) J Gimelstob	**6**	1	6^{3}
4	(United States) **R Ginepri**	**7**	**6**
(Peru) I Miranda	5	2
(France) C Saulnier	4	3
WC	(United States) **B Bryan**	**6**	**6**
8	(Austria) **J Melzer**	**7**	**7^{9}**
LL	(United States) J Salzenstein	5	6^{7}

Semifinals
(France) G Carraz	3	6^{5}
4	(United States) **R Ginepri**	**6**	**7^{7}**
WC	(United States) B Bryan	0	**6**	6^{5}
8	(Austria) **J Melzer**	**6**	4	**7^{7}**

Final
4	(United States) **Robby Ginepri**	**6**	6^{3}	**6**
8	(Austria) Jürgen Melzer	4	**7^{7}**	1
