= 2002 Miller Lite Hall of Fame Championships – Doubles =

Doubles
- 2002 Miller Lite Hall of Fame Championships

Final
- Champions: (United States) Bob Bryan (United States) Mike Bryan
- Runners-up: (Austria) Jürgen Melzer (Germany) Alexander Popp
- Score: 7–5, 6–3

Details
- Draw: 16
- Seeds: 4

Events
Singles	Doubles
← 2001 ·	Hall of Fame Open	· 2003 →

Bob Bryan and Mike Bryan were the defending champions and won in the final 7–5, 6–3 against Jürgen Melzer and Alexander Popp.

== Seeds ==
1. (United States) Bob Bryan / (United States) Mike Bryan (champions)
2. (Austria) Julian Knowle / (Germany) Michael Kohlmann (first round)
3. (United States) Justin Gimelstob / (France) Michaël Llodra (first round)
4. (Australia) Ben Ellwood / (South Africa) Chris Haggard (first round)

== Draw ==
=== Key ===
- Q = Qualifier
- WC = Wild card
- LL = Lucky loser
- Alt = Alternate
- SE = Special exempt
- PR = Protected ranking
- ITF = ITF entry
- JE = Junior exempt
- w/o = Walkover
- r = Retired
- d = Defaulted
- SR = Special ranking

First round
1	(United States) B Bryan (United States) M Bryan	6	6^{5}	6
(South Africa) N Godwin (The Bahamas) M Merklein	2	7^{7}	4
(Romania) G Trifu (United States) G Weiner	6	6
WC	(United States) H Cicma (South Africa) G Schweitzer	0	4
4	(Australia) B Ellwood (South Africa) C Haggard	6	3	4
(Australia) W Arthurs (Israel) J Erlich	1	6	6
WC	(United States) J Blake (United States) T Blake	7^{7}	6
WC	(United States) S Kenney (Jamaica) R Russell	6^{4}	3
(South Africa) J Coetzee (Czech Republic) O Fukárek	6	7
(United States) T Dent (United Kingdom) M Lee	3	5
(United States) M Fish (United States) J Morrison	6	6^{6}	6
3	(United States) J Gimelstob (France) M Llodra	3	7^{8}	2
(United States) B Coupe (South Africa) S Rudman	7^{7}	6^{6}	7^{7}
(Switzerland) Y Allegro (Argentina) E Massa	6^{2}	7^{8}	6^{4}
(Austria) J Melzer (Germany) A Popp	6	6
2	(Austria) J Knowle (Germany) M Kohlmann	3	1

Quarterfinals
1	(United States) B Bryan (United States) M Bryan	6	3	6
(Romania) G Trifu (United States) G Weiner	4	6	3
(Australia) W Arthurs (Israel) J Erlich	4	5
WC	(United States) J Blake (United States) T Blake	6	7
(South Africa) J Coetzee (Czech Republic) O Fukárek	1	4
(United States) M Fish (United States) J Morrison	6	6
(United States) B Coupe (South Africa) S Rudman	4	4
(Austria) J Melzer (Germany) A Popp	6	6

Semifinals
1	(United States) B Bryan (United States) M Bryan	6	6
WC	(United States) J Blake (United States) T Blake	3	4
(United States) M Fish (United States) J Morrison	5	6	3
(Austria) J Melzer (Germany) A Popp	7	4	6

Final
1	(United States) B Bryan (United States) M Bryan	7	6
(Austria) J Melzer (Germany) A Popp	5	3
