= 2005 Campbell's Hall of Fame Tennis Championships – Doubles =

Doubles
- 2005 Campbell's Hall of Fame Tennis Championships

Final
- Champions: (Australia) Jordan Kerr (United States) Jim Thomas
- Runners-up: (United States) Graydon Oliver (United States) Travis Parrott
- Score: 7–6^{(7–5)}, 7–6^{(7–5)}

Details
- Draw: 16 (2WC)
- Seeds: 4

Events
Singles	Doubles
- Hall of Fame Open

Jordan Kerr and Jim Thomas successfully defended their title by defeating Graydon Oliver and Travis Parrott 7–6^{(7–5)}, 7–6^{(7–5)} in the final.

== Seeds ==
1. (United States) Graydon Oliver / (United States) Travis Parrott (final)
2. (Australia) Jordan Kerr / (United States) Jim Thomas (champions)
3. (Italy) Daniele Bracciali / (Italy) Uros Vico (semifinals)
4. (South Africa) Chris Haggard / (Australia) Stephen Huss (first round)

== Draw ==
Key

- Q = Qualifier
- WC = Wild card
- LL = Lucky loser
- Alt = Alternate
- ITF = ITF entry
- PR = Protected ranking
- SR = Special ranking
- SE = Special exempt
- JE = Junior exempt
- JR = Junior Accelerator Programme entrant
- CO = College Accelerator Programme entrant
- NG = Next Gen Accelerator Program entrant
- w/o = Walkover
- r = Retired
- d = Defaulted

=== Draw ===
First round
1	(United States) G Oliver (United States) T Parrott	7^{9}	6^{6}	6
WC	(United States) S Oudsema (United States) R Ram	6^{7}	7^{8}	3
(Slovakia) K Kučera (Slovakia) M Mertiňák	6	7
(United States) H Montgomery (United States) T Phillips	4	5
3	(Italy) D Bracciali (Italy) U Vico	6	6^{8}	6
WC	(Serbia and Montenegro) D Vemić (United States) G Weiner	2	7^{10}	1
(South Africa) J Coetzee (South Africa) W Moodie	6	7^{7}
(Belgium) G Elseneer (Chinese Taipei) J Wang	2	6^{5}
(France) G Carraz (Germany) A Waske	6^{3}	6^{5}
(United States) A Delić (United States) J Morrison	7^{7}	7^{7}
(Ecuador) G Lapentti (United States) V Spadea	3	7^{8}	6
4	(South Africa) C Haggard (Australia) S Huss	6	6^{6}	3
(Canada) F Dancevic (United States) B Reynolds	7	1	6
(United States) T Dent (United States) R Ginepri	5	6	3
(France) A Dupuis (France) C Saulnier	5	4
2	(Australia) J Kerr (United States) J Thomas	7	6

Quarterfinals
1	(United States) G Oliver (United States) T Parrott	6	6
(Slovakia) K Kučera (Slovakia) M Mertiňák	1	4
3	(Italy) D Bracciali (Italy) U Vico	7^{7}	6
(South Africa) J Coetzee (South Africa) W Moodie	6^{3}	3
(United States) A Delić (United States) J Morrison
(Ecuador) G Lapentti (United States) V Spadea	w/o
(Canada) F Dancevic (United States) B Reynolds	7^{7}	3	6^{5}
2	(Australia) J Kerr (United States) J Thomas	6^{4}	6	7^{7}

Semifinals
1	(United States) G Oliver (United States) T Parrott	7^{7}	6
3	(Italy) D Bracciali (Italy) U Vico	6^{5}	2
(Ecuador) G Lapentti (United States) V Spadea
2	(Australia) J Kerr (United States) J Thomas	w/o

Final
1	(United States) G Oliver (United States) T Parrott	6^{5}	6^{5}
2	(Australia) J Kerr (United States) J Thomas	7^{7}	7^{7}
