= 2009 Internationaux du Doubs – Open de Franche-Comté – Doubles =

Open de Franche-Comté – Doubles
- 2009 Internationaux du Doubs – Open de Franche-Comté

Final
- Champions: (Slovakia) Karol Beck (Czech Republic) Jaroslav Levinský
- Runners-up: (Czech Republic) David Škoch (Slovakia) Igor Zelenay
- Score: 2–6, 7–5, 10–7

Events
Singles	Doubles
← 2008 ·	Internationaux du Doubs – Open de Franche-Comté

Philipp Petzschner and Alexander Peya were the defending champions; however, they chose to not participate this year.
Karol Beck and Jaroslav Levinský won in the final 2–6, 7–5, 10–7, against David Škoch and Igor Zelenay.

== Seeds ==
1. (Sweden) Johan Brunström / (Netherlands Antilles) Jean-Julien Rojer (quarterfinals)
2. (South Africa) Chris Haggard / (Czech Republic) Pavel Vízner (semifinals)
3. (Romania) Florin Mergea / (Romania) Horia Tecău (quarterfinals)
4. (Czech Republic) David Škoch / (Slovakia) Igor Zelenay (final)

== Draw ==
=== Key ===
- Q = Qualifier
- WC = Wild card
- LL = Lucky loser
- Alt = Alternate
- SE = Special exempt
- PR = Protected ranking
- ITF = ITF entry
- JE = Junior exempt
- w/o = Walkover
- r = Retired
- d = Defaulted
- SR = Special ranking

=== Draw ===
First round
1	(Sweden) J Brunström (Netherlands Antilles) J-J Rojer	7	7
WC	(France) M Montcourt (France) A Sidorenko	5	6^{1}
WC	(France) A Mannarino (France) J Ouanna	3	4
(Russia) M Elgin (Germany) F Moser	6	6
4	(Romania) F Mergea (Romania) H Tecău	7	6
(Portugal) F Gil (Czech Republic) P Šnobel	5	3
(Uzbekistan) D Istomin (Denmark) K Pless	5	6^{5}
(Slovakia) K Beck (Czech Republic) J Levinský	7	7
(Austria) P Oswald (Switzerland) J-C Scherrer	6^{4}	6	[9]
(France) N Mahut (France) É Roger-Vasselin	7	1	[11]
(France) T Ascione (France) N Tourte	6	3	[5]
3	(Czech Republic) D Škoch (Slovakia) I Zelenay	3	6	[10]
(Kazakhstan) M Kukushkin (Italy) A Motti	2	7	[12]
(United Kingdom) J Auckland (Belgium) K Vliegen	6	5	[10]
(Germany) M Kohlmann (Germany) P Marx	6^{5}	2
2	(South Africa) C Haggard (Czech Republic) P Vízner	7	6

Quarterfinals
1	(Sweden) J Brunström (Netherlands Antilles) J-J Rojer	6^{4}	1
(Russia) M Elgin (Germany) F Moser	7	6
4	(Romania) F Mergea (Romania) H Tecău	4	2
(Slovakia) K Beck (Czech Republic) J Levinský	6	6
(France) N Mahut (France) É Roger-Vasselin	w/o
3	(Czech Republic) D Škoch (Slovakia) I Zelenay
(Kazakhstan) M Kukushkin (Italy) A Motti	7	5	[4]
2	(South Africa) C Haggard (Czech Republic) P Vízner	5	7	[10]

Semifinals
(Russia) M Elgin (Germany) F Moser	6^{0}	6	[10]
(Slovakia) K Beck (Czech Republic) J Levinský	7	3	[12]
3	(Czech Republic) D Škoch (Slovakia) I Zelenay	6	6
2	(South Africa) C Haggard (Czech Republic) P Vízner	3	3

Finals
(Slovakia) K Beck (Czech Republic) J Levinský	2	7	[10]
3	(Czech Republic) D Škoch (Slovakia) I Zelenay	6	5	[7]
