= 2001 Miller Lite Hall of Fame Championships – Singles =

Singles
- 2001 Miller Lite Hall of Fame Championships
- 2000 Champion: (Netherlands) Peter Wessels

Final
- Champion: (South Africa) Neville Godwin
- Runner-up: (United Kingdom) Martin Lee
- Score: 6–1, 6–4

Events
Singles	Doubles
- Miller Lite Hall of Fame Championships

Peter Wessels was the defending champion but lost in the second round to James Blake.

Neville Godwin won in the final 6–1, 6–4 against Martin Lee.

== Seeds ==
A champion seed is indicated in bold text while text in italics indicates the round in which that seed was eliminated.

1. (Belarus) Vladimir Voltchkov (first round)
2. (Germany) Rainer Schüttler (quarterfinals)
3. (Italy) Davide Sanguinetti (quarterfinals)
4. (France) Antony Dupuis (first round)
5. (Germany) Lars Burgsmüller (first round)
6. (Italy) Gianluca Pozzi (first round)
7. (Netherlands) Jan Siemerink (first round)
8. (Russia) Andrei Stoliarov (first round)

== Draw ==
Key

- Q = Qualifier
- WC = Wild card
- LL = Lucky loser
- Alt = Alternate
- ITF = ITF entry
- PR = Protected ranking
- SR = Special ranking
- SE = Special exempt
- JE = Junior exempt
- JR = Junior Accelerator Programme entrant
- CO = College Accelerator Programme entrant
- NG = Next Gen Accelerator Program entrant
- w/o = Walkover
- r = Retired
- d = Defaulted

First round
1	(Belarus) V Voltchkov	**6**	1	2
(United States) **J Blake**	4	**6**	**6**
(Netherlands) **P Wessels**	**7^{7}**	**6**
(Czech Republic) T Zíb	6^{5}	1
Q	(United States) **K Capalik**	**6**	**7**
(United States) J Gimelstob	2	5
Q	(United States) **J Salzenstein**	**6**	6^{1}	**6**
7	(Netherlands) J Siemerink	2	**7^{7}**	1
3	(Italy) **D Sanguinetti**	**6**	**6**
LL	(Zimbabwe) W Black	3	3
(United States) **C Mamiit**	**6**	**6**
WC	(United States) M Bryan	4	4
Q	(United States) **G Weiner**	**7^{7}**	**7**
(Brazil) A Sá	6^{3}	5
(United Kingdom) **M Lee**	**6**	**6**
5	(Germany) L Burgsmüller	3	2
8	(Russia) A Stoliarov	4	**7**	5
WC	(United States) **M Fish**	**6**	5	**7**
(United States) B Bryan	0	**7^{7}**	6^{4}
(France) **M Llodra**	**6**	6^{2}	**7^{7}**
(Czech Republic) J Vacek	4	1
(Armenia) **S Sargsian**	**6**	**6**
(South Africa) **N Godwin**	**7^{7}**	**7**
4	(France) A Dupuis	6^{3}	5
6	(Italy) G Pozzi	**6**	4	2
(Denmark) **K Carlsen**	3	**6**	**6**
WC	(United States) **T Dent**	**6**	**6**
Q	(Czech Republic) O Fukárek	3	2
(Georgia (country)) I Labadze	3	2
(Czech Republic) **M Damm**	**6**	**6**
(United States) K Kim	4	4
2	(Germany) **R Schüttler**	**6**	**6**

Second round
(United States) **J Blake**	**6**	**6**
(Netherlands) P Wessels	4	1
Q	(United States) **K Capalik**	**6**	**6**
Q	(United States) J Salzenstein	2	3
3	(Italy) **D Sanguinetti**	**7**	2	**6**
(United States) C Mamiit	5	**6**	2
Q	(United States) G Weiner	3	**6**	2
(United Kingdom) **M Lee**	**6**	3	**6**
WC	(United States) M Fish	**7**	3	6^{5}
(France) **M Llodra**	5	**6**	**7^{7}**
(Armenia) S Sargsian	3	**6**	3
(South Africa) **N Godwin**	**6**	2	**6**
(Denmark) **K Carlsen**	**7^{7}**	**6**
WC	(United States) T Dent	6^{2}	3
(Czech Republic) M Damm	1	4
2	(Germany) **R Schüttler**	**6**	**6**

Quarterfinals
(United States) **J Blake**	**6**	3	**6**
Q	(United States) K Capalik	2	**6**	3
3	(Italy) D Sanguinetti	3	**6**	4
(United Kingdom) **M Lee**	**6**	3	**6**
(France) M Llodra	1	2
(South Africa) **N Godwin**	**6**	**6**
(Denmark) **K Carlsen**	**6**	**6**
2	(Germany) R Schüttler	2	2

Semifinals
(United States) J Blake	4	**6**	6^{5}
(United Kingdom) **M Lee**	**6**	1	**7^{7}**
(South Africa) **N Godwin**	**6**	6^{2}	**7^{8}**
(Denmark) K Carlsen	3	**7^{7}**	6^{6}

Final
(United Kingdom) Martin Lee	1	4
(South Africa) **Neville Godwin**	**6**	**6**
