= 2002 Wimbledon Championships – Men's doubles qualifying =

Men's doubles qualifying
- 2002 Wimbledon Championships

Events
Singles	men	women		boys	girls
Doubles	men	women	mixed	boys	girls
WC Singles	men	women	quad
WC Doubles	men	women	quad
Legends	men	women	seniors

Qualification
Singles	men	women
Doubles	men	women
- Wimbledon Championships

Players and pairs who neither have high enough rankings nor receive wild cards may participate in a qualifying tournament held one week before the annual Wimbledon Tennis Championships.

== Seeds ==
1. (Australia) Dejan Petrovic / (Czech Republic) David Škoch (qualifying competition, lucky losers)
2. (Slovakia) Karol Beck / (Czech Republic) Jaroslav Levinský (qualified)
3. (Argentina) Sebastián Prieto / (Russia) Yuri Schukin (first round)
4. (Germany) Alexander Waske / (Croatia) Lovro Zovko (qualified)
5. (United States) Brandon Coupe / (United States) Kevin Kim (first round)
6. (South Africa) Justin Bower / (South Africa) Shaun Rudman (first round)
7. (Israel) Amir Hadad / (Pakistan) Aisam-ul-Haq Qureshi (qualified)
8. (Finland) Tuomas Ketola / (United States) Eric Taino (first round)

== Qualifiers ==
1. (United States) Robert Kendrick / (Netherlands) Rogier Wassen
2. (Slovakia) Karol Beck / (Czech Republic) Jaroslav Levinský
3. (Israel) Amir Hadad / (Pakistan) Aisam-ul-Haq Qureshi
4. (Germany) Alexander Waske / (Croatia) Lovro Zovko

== Lucky losers ==
1. (Australia) Dejan Petrovic / (Czech Republic) David Škoch

== Qualifying draw ==
=== First qualifier ===
First round
1	(Australia) Dejan Petrovic (Czech Republic) David Škoch	6	6
WC	(United Kingdom) Oliver Freelove (United Kingdom) James Smith	4	2
(United States) Robert Kendrick (Netherlands) Rogier Wassen	4	6	6
5	(United States) Brandon Coupe (United States) Kevin Kim	6	3	4

Qualifying competition
1	(Australia) Dejan Petrovic (Czech Republic) David Škoch	2	7^{9}	4	2
(United States) Robert Kendrick (Netherlands) Rogier Wassen	6	6^{7}	6	6

=== Second qualifier ===
First round
2	(Slovakia) Karol Beck (Czech Republic) Jaroslav Levinský	6^{3}	6	8
(Austria) Oliver Marach (Austria) Alexander Peya	7^{7}	2	6
(Belgium) Gilles Elseneer (Canada) Frédéric Niemeyer	6	7
8	(Finland) Tuomas Ketola (United States) Eric Taino	3	5

Qualifying competition
2	(Slovakia) Karol Beck (Czech Republic) Jaroslav Levinský	6	6	3	7^{7}
(Belgium) Gilles Elseneer (Canada) Frédéric Niemeyer	2	1	6	6^{2}

=== Third qualifier ===
First round
3	(Argentina) Sebastián Prieto (Russia) Yuri Schukin	6^{4}	3
(Argentina) Ignacio Hirigoyen (Netherlands) Djalmar Sistermans	7^{7}	6
(Australia) Jaymon Crabb (Australia) Peter Luczak	4	6^{7}
7	(Israel) Amir Hadad (Pakistan) Aisam-ul-Haq Qureshi	6	7^{9}

Qualifying competition
(Argentina) Ignacio Hirigoyen (Netherlands) Djalmar Sistermans	7^{7}	3	7^{7}	6^{3}	13
7	(Israel) Amir Hadad (Pakistan) Aisam-ul-Haq Qureshi	6^{3}	6	6^{5}	7^{7}	15

=== Fourth qualifier ===
First round
4	(Germany) Alexander Waske (Croatia) Lovro Zovko	6	6
(Sweden) Peter Nyborg (United States) Jack Waite	4	4
(South Africa) Brent Haygarth (Italy) Laurence Tieleman	3	6	6
6	(South Africa) Justin Bower (South Africa) Shaun Rudman	6	3	4

Qualifying competition
4	(Germany) Alexander Waske (Croatia) Lovro Zovko	6	6	6^{3}	6
(South Africa) Brent Haygarth (Italy) Laurence Tieleman	4	3	7^{7}	4
