= 2003 Miller Lite Hall of Fame Championships – Doubles =

Doubles
- 2003 Miller Lite Hall of Fame Championships

Final
- Champions: (Australia) Jordan Kerr (Australia) David Macpherson
- Runners-up: (Austria) Julian Knowle (Austria) Jürgen Melzer
- Score: 7–6^{(7–4)}, 6–3

Details
- Draw: 16
- Seeds: 4

Events
Singles	Doubles
← 2002 ·	Hall of Fame Open	· 2004 →

Bob Bryan and Mike Bryan were the defending champions but did not compete that year.

Jordan Kerr and David Macpherson won in the final 7–6^{(7–4)}, 6–3 against Julian Knowle and Jürgen Melzer.

== Seeds ==
1. (United States) ~~Bob Bryan~~ / (United States) ~~Mike Bryan~~ (withdrew)
2. (United States) Brandon Coupe / (United States) Jim Thomas (semifinals)
3. (The Bahamas) Mark Merklein / (United States) Jeff Morrison (first round)
4. (Australia) Todd Perry / (Japan) Thomas Shimada (quarterfinals)

== Draw ==
=== Key ===
- Q = Qualifier
- WC = Wild card
- LL = Lucky loser
- Alt = Alternate
- SE = Special exempt
- PR = Protected ranking
- ITF = ITF entry
- JE = Junior exempt
- w/o = Walkover
- r = Retired
- d = Defaulted
- SR = Special ranking

First round
ALT	(Jamaica) D Brown (United States) N Crowell	4	6	5
(United States) G Oliver (United States) B Vahaly	6	3	7
WC	(United States) M Fish (United States) B Hodge	2	4
(United States) C Mamiit (Serbia and Montenegro) D Vemić	6	6
4	(Australia) T Perry (Japan) T Shimada	7^{8}	7
(United States) J Blake (United States) T Blake	6^{6}	5
WC	(India) P Amritraj (United States) R Ram	4	0
(Austria) J Knowle (Austria) J Melzer	6	6
(Switzerland) Y Allegro (Switzerland) G Bastl	7	7^{8}
(Italy) S Pescosolido (United States) J Salzenstein	5	6^{6}
(Australia) J Kerr (Australia) D Macpherson	6	6^{5}	6
3	(The Bahamas) M Merklein (United States) J Morrison	3	7^{7}	1
(Switzerland) I Heuberger (France) N Thomann	6^{5}	6	6
(France) G Carraz (France) C Saulnier	7^{7}	3	4
(United States) J Gimelstob (United States) R Ginepri	3	6^{6}
2	(United States) B Coupe (United States) J Thomas	6	7^{8}

Quarterfinals
(United States) G Oliver (United States) B Vahaly	6	7^{7}
(United States) C Mamiit (Serbia and Montenegro) D Vemić	3	6^{4}
4	(Australia) T Perry (Japan) T Shimada	6^{5}	4
(Austria) J Knowle (Austria) J Melzer	7^{7}	6
(Switzerland) Y Allegro (Switzerland) G Bastl	6^{2}	4
(Australia) J Kerr (Australia) D Macpherson	7^{7}	6
(Switzerland) I Heuberger (France) N Thomann	6^{3}	4
2	(United States) B Coupe (United States) J Thomas	7^{7}	6

Semifinals
(United States) G Oliver (United States) B Vahaly	3	7^{7}	5
(Austria) J Knowle (Austria) J Melzer	6	6^{2}	7
(Australia) J Kerr (Australia) D Macpherson	6^{3}	6	6
2	(United States) B Coupe (United States) J Thomas	7^{7}	4	1

Final
(Austria) J Knowle (Austria) J Melzer	6^{4}	3
(Australia) J Kerr (Australia) D Macpherson	7^{7}	6
