= 2005 Campbell's Hall of Fame Championships =

2005 Campbell's Hall of Fame Tennis Championships
- Date: July 4–10
- Edition: 30th
- Category: ATP International Series
- Draw: 32S / 16D
- Prize money: $355,000
- Surface: Grass / outdoor
- Location: Newport, Rhode Island, US
- Venue: Newport Casino

Champions

Singles
- (United Kingdom) Greg Rusedski

Doubles
- (Australia) Jordan Kerr / (United States) Jim Thomas
← 2004 ·	Hall of Fame Open	· 2006 →

The 2005 Campbell's Hall of Fame Championships was the 30th edition of the tennis tournament Hall of Fame Tennis Championships. It was played on outdoor grass courts at the International Tennis Hall of Fame in Newport, Rhode Island in the United States and was part of the ATP International Series of the 2005 ATP Tour. It took place from July 4 through July 10, 2005. Third-seeded Greg Rusedski won the final over Vince Spadea.

== Finals ==
=== Singles ===
(United Kingdom) Greg Rusedski defeated (United States) Vince Spadea 7–6^{(7–3)}, 2–6, 6–4

- It was Rusedski's only singles title of the year and the 15th and last of his career.

=== Doubles ===
(Australia) Jordan Kerr / (United States) Jim Thomas defeated (United States) Graydon Oliver / (United States) Travis Parrott 7–6^{(7–5)}, 7–6^{(7–5)}
