= 2009 Internationaux du Doubs – Open de Franche-Comté =

Professional tennis tournament

- Date: February 23 – March 1
- Edition: 13th
- Location: Besançon, France

Champions

Singles
- (Belgium) Kristof Vliegen

Doubles
- (Slovakia) Karol Beck / (Slovakia) Jaroslav Levinský
← 2008 ·	Internationaux du Doubs – Open de Franche-Comté

The 2009 Internationaux du Doubs – Open de Franche-Comté was a professional tennis tournament played on outdoor hard courts. It was part of the 2009 ATP Challenger Tour. It took place in Besançon, France between 23 February and 1 March 2009.

== Singles main-draw entrants ==
=== Seeds ===
Country	Player	Rank	Seed
POR	Frederico Gil	83	1
GER	Andreas Beck	97	2
UZB	Denis Istomin	98	3
BEL	Kristof Vliegen	111	4
GER	Michael Berrer	112	5
BEL	Olivier Rochus	114	6
FRA	Nicolas Mahut	124	7
FRA	Adrian Mannarino	131	8

- Rankings are as of February 16, 2009.

=== Other entrants ===
The following players received wildcards into the singles main draw:

- (Bulgaria) Grigor Dimitrov
- (France) Nicolas Guillaume
- (France) Julien Jeanpierre
- (France) Benoît Paire

The following players received entry from the qualifying draw:

- (Ukraine) Illya Marchenko
- (Austria) Philipp Oswald
- (Poland) Michał Przysiężny
- (France) Nicolas Renavand
- (France) Jean-Christophe Faurel (as a Lucky loser)

== Champions ==
=== Men's singles ===
(Belgium) Kristof Vliegen def. (Germany) Andreas Beck, 6–2, 6–7(6), 6–3

=== Men's doubles ===
(Slovakia) Karol Beck / (Czech Republic) Jaroslav Levinský def. (Czech Republic) David Škoch / (Slovakia) Igor Zelenay, 2–6, 7–5, 10–7
