= Nottingham Challenger =

British tennis tournament from 2002–2007

Defunct tennis tournament
- Event name: Nottingham Challenger
- Location: Nottingham, United Kingdom
- Category: ATP Challenger Tour
- Surface: Hard (2002–2003); Grass (2004–2007)

The Nottingham Challenger (also known as the LTA Nottingham Challenger or LTA Summer Challenger) was an annual tennis tournament played in Nottingham, England. The tournament was part of the ATP Challenger Tour. The tournament was originally held on hardcourts in late October before being moved to the beginning of July and grass courts as a follow-up event to the Wimbledon Championships.

== Past finals ==
=== Singles ===
Year	Champion	Runner-up	Score
2007	(Australia) Alun Jones	(Pakistan) Aisam-ul-Haq Qureshi	6–3, 4–6, 6–4
2006	(France) Antony Dupuis	(Spain) Iván Navarro	6–4, 7–5
2005	(United Kingdom) Alex Bogdanovic	(United Kingdom) Mark Hilton	6–3, 7–5
2004	(France) Jo-Wilfried Tsonga	(United Kingdom) Alex Bogdanovic	6–3, 6–4
2003	(Sweden) Joachim Johansson	(Netherlands) John van Lottum	6–4, 6–7^{(4–7)}, 6–2
2002	(Belgium) Gilles Elseneer	(United Kingdom) Arvind Parmar	7–5, 6–2

=== Doubles ===
Year	Champions	Runners-up	Score
2007	(India) Rohan Bopanna (Pakistan) Aisam-ul-Haq Qureshi	(India) Mustafa Ghouse (United Kingdom) Josh Goodall	6–3, 7–6^{(7–5)}
2006	(United Kingdom) Martin Lee (United Kingdom) Jonathan Marray	(United Kingdom) Josh Goodall (United Kingdom) Ross Hutchins	3–6, 6–3, [10–3]
2005	(United Kingdom) Josh Goodall (United Kingdom) Martin Lee	(France) Jean-Michel Pequery (Pakistan) Aisam-ul-Haq Qureshi	6–3, 7–6^{(7–0)}
2004	(Australia) Nathan Healey (Finland) Tuomas Ketola	(Switzerland) Stéphane Bohli (Switzerland) Jean-Claude Scherrer	0–6, 6–4, 6–2
2003	(Israel) Amir Hadad (Israel) Harel Levy	(United States) Scott Humphries (The Bahamas) Mark Merklein	6–4, 6–7^{(3–7)}, 6–3
2002	(Australia) Ashley Fisher (Australia) Stephen Huss	(United States) Scott Humphries (The Bahamas) Mark Merklein	6–3, 7–6^{(7–5)}

== See also ==
- Nottingham Open (ATP/WTA tournament started in 1970)
- Nottingham Trophy (Challenger tournament started in 2009)
- Lexus Nottingham Challenger (Challenger tournament started in 2024)
