= 2002 Miller Lite Hall of Fame Championships =

- Date: July 8–14
- Edition: 27th
- Category: International Series
- Draw: 32S / 16D
- Prize money: $375,000
- Surface: Grass court / outdoor
- Location: Newport, Rhode Island, US
- Venue: International Tennis Hall of Fame

Champions

Singles
- (United States) Taylor Dent

Doubles
- (United States) Bob Bryan / (United States) Mike Bryan
← 2001 ·	Hall of Fame Open	· 2003 →

The 2002 Miller Lite Hall of Fame Championships was a men's tennis tournament played on grass courts at the International Tennis Hall of Fame in Newport, Rhode Island in the United States and was part of the International Series of the 2002 ATP Tour. It was the 27th edition of the tournament and ran from July 8 through July 14, 2002. Taylor Dent won the singles title.

== Finals ==
=== Singles ===
(United States) Taylor Dent defeated (United States) James Blake 6–1, 4–6, 6–4

- It was Dent's only title of the year and the 1st of his career.

=== Doubles ===
(United States) Bob Bryan / (United States) Mike Bryan defeated (Austria) Jürgen Melzer / (Germany) Alexander Popp 7–5, 6–3

- It was Bob Bryan's 3rd title of the year and the 7th of his career. It was Mike Bryan's 4th title of the year and the 8th of his career.
