= 2002 Wimbledon Championships – Women's singles qualifying =

Women's singles qualifying
- 2002 Wimbledon Championships

Events
Singles	men	women		boys	girls
Doubles	men	women	mixed	boys	girls
WC Singles	men	women	quad
WC Doubles	men	women	quad
Legends	men	women	seniors

Qualification
Singles	men	women
Doubles	men	women
- Wimbledon Championships

Players and pairs who neither have high enough rankings nor receive wild cards may participate in a qualifying tournament held one week before the annual Wimbledon Tennis Championships.

== Seeds ==
1. (Japan) Shinobu Asagoe (qualifying competition)
2. (Austria) Patricia Wartusch (qualifying competition)
3. (Hungary) Anikó Kapros (first round)
4. (Venezuela) Milagros Sequera (first round)
5. (United States) Sarah Taylor (first round)
6. (South Korea) Cho Yoon-jeong (qualifying competition)
7. (Ukraine) Julia Vakulenko (first round)
8. (Belgium) Els Callens (qualified)
9. (Czech Republic) Iveta Benešová (qualified)
10. (Italy) Antonella Serra Zanetti (qualified)
11. (United States) Mashona Washington (first round)
12. (Czech Republic) Sandra Kleinová (first round)
13. (Russia) Evgenia Kulikovskaya (qualifying competition)
14. (Netherlands) Kristie Boogert (first round)
15. (Italy) Roberta Vinci (qualified)
16. (Ukraine) Tatiana Perebiynis (qualified)
17. (Chinese Taipei) Hsieh Su-wei (second round)
18. (United States) Laura Granville (qualified)
19. (Czech Republic) Alena Vašková (second round)
20. (Czech Republic) Zuzana Ondrášková (qualified)
21. (Madagascar) Dally Randriantefy (second round)
22. (France) Alexandra Fusai (qualified)
23. (Slovakia) Ľubomíra Kurhajcová (first round)
24. (South Africa) Liezel Huber (second round)

== Qualifiers ==
1. (France) Alexandra Fusai
2. (Ukraine) Tatiana Perebiynis
3. (Italy) Roberta Vinci
4. (Czech Republic) Zuzana Ondrášková
5. (Ukraine) Elena Tatarkova
6. (Switzerland) Myriam Casanova
7. (Spain) María Sánchez Lorenzo
8. (Belgium) Els Callens
9. (Czech Republic) Iveta Benešová
10. (Italy) Antonella Serra Zanetti
11. (Venezuela) María Vento-Kabchi
12. (United States) Laura Granville

== Qualifying draw ==
=== First qualifier ===
First round
1	(Japan) Shinobu Asagoe	2	6	8
(Italy) Maria Elena Camerin	6	2	6
WC	(United Kingdom) Melanie South	4	4
(Germany) Adriana Barna	6	6
(Germany) Angelika Bachmann	2	6	6
(Czech Republic) Olga Blahotová	6	4	4
(Italy) Gloria Pizzichini	6	3	1
22	(France) Alexandra Fusai	3	6	6

Second round
1	(Japan) Shinobu Asagoe	6	6
(Germany) Adriana Barna	1	3
(Germany) Angelika Bachmann	3	2
22	(France) Alexandra Fusai	6	6

Qualifying competition
1	(Japan) Shinobu Asagoe	2	4
22	(France) Alexandra Fusai	6	6

=== Second qualifier ===
First round
2	(Austria) Patricia Wartusch	6	4	6
(Czech Republic) Klára Koukalová	0	6	2
(Australia) Mireille Dittmann	6	6
(Colombia) Catalina Castaño	2	4
(Japan) Rika Fujiwara	6	3	6
(France) Camille Pin	3	6	3
(United States) Teryn Ashley	3	6	0
16	(Ukraine) Tatiana Perebiynis	6	4	6

Second round
2	(Austria) Patricia Wartusch	7	6
(Australia) Mireille Dittmann	5	2
(Japan) Rika Fujiwara	1	6	2
16	(Ukraine) Tatiana Perebiynis	6	4	6

Qualifying competition
2	(Austria) Patricia Wartusch	6	3	3
16	(Ukraine) Tatiana Perebiynis	3	6	6

=== Third qualifier ===
First round
3	(Hungary) Anikó Kapros	0	5
(Japan) Akiko Morigami	6	7
(Russia) Ekaterina Sysoeva	6	6
(Republic of Ireland) Kelly Liggan	4	2
(France) Anne-Laure Heitz	6	6
(Austria) Sylvia Plischke	3	2
(Australia) Lisa McShea	2	6	2
15	(Italy) Roberta Vinci	6	3	6

Second round
(Japan) Akiko Morigami	6^{2}	6	7
(Russia) Ekaterina Sysoeva	7^{7}	3	9
(France) Anne-Laure Heitz	6^{3}	7^{9}	1
15	(Italy) Roberta Vinci	7^{7}	6^{7}	6

Qualifying competition
(Russia) Ekaterina Sysoeva	3	7^{7}	1
15	(Italy) Roberta Vinci	6	6^{2}	6

=== Fourth qualifier ===
First round
4	(Venezuela) Milagros Sequera	4	6	2
(Australia) Bryanne Stewart	6	2	6
(Hungary) Kira Nagy	6^{5}	1
(Russia) Dinara Safina	7^{7}	6
(Bulgaria) Maria Geznenge	1	0
(Estonia) Maret Ani	6	6
WC	(United Kingdom) Alice Barnes	3	1
20	(Czech Republic) Zuzana Ondrášková	6	6

Second round
(Australia) Bryanne Stewart	4	5
(Russia) Dinara Safina	6	7
(Estonia) Maret Ani	2	3
20	(Czech Republic) Zuzana Ondrášková	6	6

Qualifying competition
(Russia) Dinara Safina	6	2	6
20	(Czech Republic) Zuzana Ondrášková	4	6	8

=== Fifth qualifier ===
First round
5	(United States) Sarah Taylor	3	2
(Netherlands) Anousjka van Exel	6	6
(United States) Ansley Cargill	6	7
(Australia) Amanda Grahame	4	5
(Russia) Svetlana Kuznetsova	2	6	6
WC	(United Kingdom) Helen Crook	6	4	1
(Ukraine) Elena Tatarkova	6	6
23	(Slovakia) Ľubomíra Kurhajcová	2	3

Second round
(Netherlands) Anousjka van Exel	2	2
(United States) Ansley Cargill	6	6
(Russia) Svetlana Kuznetsova	7	4	2
(Ukraine) Elena Tatarkova	5	6	6

Qualifying competition
(United States) Ansley Cargill	1	6	1
(Ukraine) Elena Tatarkova	6	4	6

=== Sixth qualifier ===
First round
6	(South Korea) Cho Yoon-jeong	6	6
(Czech Republic) Lenka Němečková	4	4
(Croatia) Maja Palaveršić-Coopersmith	5	3
(Germany) Vanessa Henke	7	6
(Switzerland) Myriam Casanova	6	6
WC	(Belarus) Olga Barabanschikova	3	3
(Czech Republic) Magdalena Zděnovcová	3	4
24	(South Africa) Liezel Huber	6	6

Second round
6	(South Korea) Cho Yoon-jeong	6	6
(Germany) Vanessa Henke	2	0
(Switzerland) Myriam Casanova	6	6
24	(South Africa) Liezel Huber	0	4

Qualifying competition
6	(South Korea) Cho Yoon-jeong	1	2
(Switzerland) Myriam Casanova	6	6

=== Seventh qualifier ===
First round
7	(Ukraine) Julia Vakulenko	3	5
(United States) Jane Chi	6	7
(Hungary) Katalin Marosi	4	4
(Italy) Francesca Lubiani	6	6
(Russia) Galina Fokina	3	5
(Spain) María Sánchez Lorenzo	6	7
(Luxembourg) Claudine Schaul	4	2
17	(Chinese Taipei) Hsieh Su-wei	6	6

Second round
(United States) Jane Chi	1	6	3
(Italy) Francesca Lubiani	6	4	6
(Spain) María Sánchez Lorenzo	7	6
17	(Chinese Taipei) Hsieh Su-wei	5	4

Qualifying competition
(Italy) Francesca Lubiani	4	6	8
(Spain) María Sánchez Lorenzo	6	4	10

=== Eighth qualifier ===
First round
8	(Belgium) Els Callens	6	5	6
(Japan) Miho Saeki	3	7	4
(Australia) Cindy Watson	6	4	6
(Germany) Sabine Klaschka	4	6	4
(South Korea) Jeon Mi-ra	6	6
(France) Stéphanie Cohen-Aloro	1	3
WC	(United Kingdom) Amanda Janes	6^{5}	3
19	(Czech Republic) Alena Vašková	7^{7}	6

Second round
8	(Belgium) Els Callens	6	6
(Australia) Cindy Watson	1	3
(South Korea) Jeon Mi-ra	7	6
19	(Czech Republic) Alena Vašková	5	4

Qualifying competition
8	(Belgium) Els Callens	6	5	6
(South Korea) Jeon Mi-ra	3	7	3

=== Ninth qualifier ===
First round
9	(Czech Republic) Iveta Benešová	6	4	8
(France) Laurence Andretto	4	6	6
(Australia) Christina Wheeler	4	3
(Russia) Anastasia Rodionova	6	6
(Germany) Nina Dübbers	6	6
WC	(United Kingdom) Emily Webley-Smith	1	2
(Canada) Marie-Ève Pelletier	2	2
13	(Russia) Evgenia Kulikovskaya	6	6

Second round
9	(Czech Republic) Iveta Benešová	6^{4}	6	6
(Russia) Anastasia Rodionova	7^{7}	4	3
(Germany) Nina Dübbers	6	4	4
13	(Russia) Evgenia Kulikovskaya	4	6	6

Qualifying competition
9	(Czech Republic) Iveta Benešová	6	3	6
13	(Russia) Evgenia Kulikovskaya	4	6	4

=== Tenth qualifier ===
First round
10	(Italy) Antonella Serra Zanetti	6	6
(Argentina) Gisela Dulko	1	2
(United States) Tara Snyder	6	6
(Slovakia) Eva Fislová	2	4
WC	(United Kingdom) Lorna Woodroffe	6	6
(Romania) Andreea Vanc	4	4
(Australia) Rachel McQuillan	6	7^{7}
14	(Netherlands) Kristie Boogert	4	6^{4}

Second round
10	(Italy) Antonella Serra Zanetti	6	3	6
(United States) Tara Snyder	3	6	2
WC	(United Kingdom) Lorna Woodroffe	6	2	2
(Australia) Rachel McQuillan	4	6	6

Qualifying competition
10	(Italy) Antonella Serra Zanetti	6	6
(Australia) Rachel McQuillan	3	0

=== Eleventh qualifier ===
First round
11	(United States) Mashona Washington	5	3
(Venezuela) María Vento-Kabchi	7	6
(Czech Republic) Eva Krejčová	6	6^{3}	6
(Bulgaria) Svetlana Krivencheva	3	7^{7}	2
(Mexico) Jessica Fernández	0	2
(Slovakia) Stanislava Hrozenská	6	6
WC	(United Kingdom) Cristelle Grier	4	3
21	(Madagascar) Dally Randriantefy	6	6

Second round
(Venezuela) María Vento-Kabchi	7	6
(Czech Republic) Eva Krejčová	5	1
(Slovakia) Stanislava Hrozenská	6	6
21	(Madagascar) Dally Randriantefy	4	0

Qualifying competition
(Venezuela) María Vento-Kabchi	6	6
(Slovakia) Stanislava Hrozenská	3	3

=== Twelfth qualifier ===
First round
12	(Czech Republic) Sandra Kleinová	4	6^{3}
(Czech Republic) Libuše Průšová	6	7^{7}
(Belarus) Nadejda Ostrovskaya	4	2
(Japan) Nana Miyagi	6	6
(Bulgaria) Desislava Topalova	6	4	1
(Italy) Flavia Pennetta	2	6	6
(United States) Allison Bradshaw	3	3
18	(United States) Laura Granville	6	6

Second round
(Czech Republic) Libuše Průšová	6	6
(Japan) Nana Miyagi	4	1
(Italy) Flavia Pennetta	0	6	4
18	(United States) Laura Granville	6	3	6

Qualifying competition
(Czech Republic) Libuše Průšová	6	5	3
18	(United States) Laura Granville	3	7	6
