= 2006 Campbell's Hall of Fame Tennis Championships =

- Date: July 10–16
- Edition: 31st
- Category: ATP International Series
- Draw: 32S / 16D
- Prize money: $355,000
- Surface: Grass / outdoor
- Location: Newport, Rhode Island, US

Champions

Singles
- (Australia) Mark Philippoussis

Doubles
- (United States) Robert Kendrick / (Austria) Jürgen Melzer
← 2005 ·	Hall of Fame Open	· 2007 →

The 2006 Campbell's Hall of Fame Tennis Championships was a tennis tournament played on outdoor grass courts at the International Tennis Hall of Fame in Newport, Rhode Island in the United States and was part of the ATP International Series of the 2006 ATP Tour. It was the 31st edition of the Hall of Fame Tennis Championships and took place from July 10 through July 16, 2006.

== Finals ==
=== Singles ===
(Australia) Mark Philippoussis defeated (United States) Justin Gimelstob 6–3, 7–5

- It was Philippoussis' only singles title of the year and the 11th and last of his career.

=== Doubles ===
(United States) Robert Kendrick / (Austria) Jürgen Melzer defeated (South Africa) Jeff Coetzee / (United States) Justin Gimelstob 7–6^{(7–3)}, 6–0
