= 2002 Wimbledon Championships – Women's doubles qualifying =

Women's doubles qualifying
- 2002 Wimbledon Championships

Events
Singles	men	women		boys	girls
Doubles	men	women	mixed	boys	girls
WC Singles	men	women	quad
WC Doubles	men	women	quad
Legends	men	women	seniors

Qualification
Singles	men	women
Doubles	men	women
- Wimbledon Championships

Players and pairs who neither have high enough rankings nor receive wild cards may participate in a qualifying tournament held one week before the annual Wimbledon Tennis Championships.

== Seeds ==
1. (Czech Republic) Lenka Němečková / (Romania) Andreea Vanc (qualifying competition, lucky losers)
2. (Hungary) Zsófia Gubacsi / (Hungary) Katalin Marosi (first round)
3. (Croatia) Maja Palaveršić-Coopersmith / (Canada) Marie-Ève Pelletier (first round)
4. (Germany) Vanessa Henke / (Russia) Evgenia Kulikovskaya (first round)
5. (United States) Melissa Middleton / (United States) Brie Rippner (qualifying competition)
6. (Russia) Alina Jidkova / (Australia) Bryanne Stewart (qualified)
7. (Republic of Ireland) Kelly Liggan / (Japan) Miho Saeki (qualifying competition)
8. (Chinese Taipei) Hsieh Su-wei / (New Zealand) Shelley Stephens (first round)

== Qualifiers ==
1. (Russia) Alina Jidkova / (Australia) Bryanne Stewart
2. (Canada) Renata Kolbovic / (Venezuela) Milagros Sequera
3. (United Kingdom) Anna Hawkins / (United Kingdom) Jane O'Donoghue
4. (Argentina) Gisela Dulko / (Russia) Svetlana Kuznetsova

== Lucky losers ==
1. (Czech Republic) Lenka Němečková / (Romania) Andreea Vanc

== Qualifying draw ==
=== First qualifier ===
First round
1	(Czech Republic) Lenka Němečková (Romania) Andreea Vanc	6	6
(Slovakia) Eva Fislová (Slovakia) Stanislava Hrozenská	4	4
(New Zealand) Leanne Baker (India) Manisha Malhotra	2	4
6	(Russia) Alina Jidkova (Australia) Bryanne Stewart	6	6

Qualifying competition
1	(Czech Republic) Lenka Němečková (Romania) Andreea Vanc	1	4
6	(Russia) Alina Jidkova (Australia) Bryanne Stewart	6	6

=== Second qualifier ===
First round
2	(Hungary) Zsófia Gubacsi (Hungary) Katalin Marosi	4	2
(Canada) Renata Kolbovic (Venezuela) Milagros Sequera	6	6
(Germany) Angelika Bachmann (Germany) Caroline Schneider	5	5
5	(United States) Melissa Middleton (United States) Brie Rippner	7	7

Qualifying competition
(Canada) Renata Kolbovic (Venezuela) Milagros Sequera	7	6
5	(United States) Melissa Middleton (United States) Brie Rippner	5	3

=== Third qualifier ===
First round
3	(Croatia) Maja Palaveršić-Coopersmith (Canada) Marie-Ève Pelletier	6	1	6
WC	(United Kingdom) Anna Hawkins (United Kingdom) Jane O'Donoghue	4	6	8
(Germany) Adriana Barna (Argentina) Erica Krauth	6	7
8	(Chinese Taipei) Hsieh Su-wei (New Zealand) Shelley Stephens	3	5

Qualifying competition
WC	(United Kingdom) Anna Hawkins (United Kingdom) Jane O'Donoghue	7^{8}	6
(Germany) Adriana Barna (Argentina) Erica Krauth	6^{6}	0

=== Fourth qualifier ===
First round
4	(Germany) Vanessa Henke (Russia) Evgenia Kulikovskaya	6^{4}	5
(Argentina) Gisela Dulko (Russia) Svetlana Kuznetsova	7^{7}	7
(Estonia) Maret Ani (Russia) Ekaterina Sysoeva	2	6	3
7	(Republic of Ireland) Kelly Liggan (Japan) Miho Saeki	6	2	6

Qualifying competition
(Argentina) Gisela Dulko (Russia) Svetlana Kuznetsova	6	6
7	(Republic of Ireland) Kelly Liggan (Japan) Miho Saeki	1	3
