= Shaun Rudman =

South African tennis player

- Country (sports): South Africa
- Born: 17 February 1978 (age 48)
- Plays: Right-handed
- Prize money: $37,590

Singles
- Highest ranking: No. 658 (8 Nov 1999)

Doubles
- Career record: 1–6
- Career titles: 0
- Highest ranking: No. 109 (27 May 2002)

Grand Slam doubles results
- French Open: 1R (2002)
- Wimbledon: Q1 (2002)
- US Open: Q2 (2001)

Shaun Rudman (born 17 February 1978) is a former professional tennis player from South Africa.

== Career ==
Rudman was a doubles specialist and took part in the main draw of the men's doubles event at the 2002 French Open, with David Škoch. They lost in the opening round to the Czech pairing of František Čermák and Ota Fukárek.

The South African won four Challenger doubles titles during his career. His best performance in a top tier tournament came at the 2002 Miller Lite Hall of Fame Championships, where he and partner Brandon Coupe made the quarter-finals.

Currently he is the director of Cygnet Proprietary Trading, a proprietary trading firm in Australia.

== Challenger titles ==
=== Doubles: (4) ===
No.	Year	Tournament	Surface	Partner	Opponents	Score
1.	2001	Bristol, United Kingdom	Grass	(South Africa) Wesley Moodie	(Belgium) Gilles Elseneer (Finland) Tuomas Ketola	6–4, 6–3
2.	2001	Segovia, Spain	Hard	(South Africa) Wesley Moodie	(South Africa) Neville Godwin (South Africa) Marcos Ondruska	7–6^{(7–5)}, 6–3
3.	2002	Wolfsburg, Germany	Carpet	(Czech Republic) Jan Hernych	(Italy) Filippo Messori (Italy) Gianluca Pozzi	7–6^{(7–3)}, 6–7^{(3–7)}, 6–3
4.	2002	Andorra	Hard	(South Africa) Wesley Moodie	(Chile) Hermes Gamonal (Brazil) Ricardo Mello	6–2, 6–1
