= 2001 Miller Lite Hall of Fame Championships – Doubles =

Doubles
- 2001 Miller Lite Hall of Fame Championships

Final
- Champions: (United States) Bob Bryan (United States) Mike Bryan
- Runners-up: (Brazil) André Sá (United States) Glenn Weiner
- Score: 6–3, 7–5

Events
Singles	Doubles
← 2000 ·	Miller Lite Hall of Fame Championships	· 2002 →

Jonathan Erlich and Harel Levy were the defending champions but only Erlich competed that year with Jan Siemerink.

Erlich and Siemerink lost in the quarterfinals to André Sá and Glenn Weiner.

Bob Bryan and Mike Bryan won in the final 6–3, 7–5 against Sá and Weiner.

== Seeds ==
1. (United States) Bob Bryan / (United States) Mike Bryan (champions)
2. (United States) Justin Gimelstob / (United States) Scott Humphries (first round)
3. (Zimbabwe) Wayne Black / (United States) Jim Thomas (first round)
4. (South Africa) David Adams / (France) Michaël Llodra (first round)

== Draw ==
=== Key ===
- Q = Qualifier
- WC = Wild card
- LL = Lucky loser
- Alt = Alternate
- SE = Special exempt
- PR = Protected ranking
- ITF = ITF entry
- JE = Junior exempt
- w/o = Walkover
- r = Retired
- d = Defaulted
- SR = Special ranking

First round
1	(United States) B Bryan (United States) M Bryan	6	6
WC	(United States) B Brier (United States) C Drake	3	0
(United States) K Kim (United States) G Sontag	6	6
WC	(United States) J Blake (United States) T Blake	4	3
3	(Zimbabwe) W Black (United States) J Thomas	3	6	3
(South Africa) N Godwin (South Africa) R Koenig	6	2	6
(Japan) T Shimada (United Kingdom) K Spencer	6	6
WC	(Germany) R Schüttler (Russia) D Sitak	4	3
ALT	(Germany) L Burgsmüller (Australia) T Perry	6	4	6
(Georgia (country)) I Labadze (Russia) A Stoliarov	2	6	4
WC	(United States) T Dent (United States) M Fish	6	6
4	(South Africa) D Adams (France) M Llodra	4	3
(Brazil) A Sá (United States) G Weiner	6	6^{5}	7^{7}
(Czech Republic) M Damm (Czech Republic) O Fukárek	2	7^{7}	6^{2}
(Israel) J Erlich (Netherlands) J Siemerink	7^{7}	6
2	(United States) J Gimelstob (United States) S Humphries	6^{3}	4

Quarterfinals
1	(United States) B Bryan (United States) M Bryan	5	6	6
(United States) K Kim (United States) G Sontag	7	1	3
(South Africa) N Godwin (South Africa) R Koenig	7^{7}	6
(Japan) T Shimada (United Kingdom) K Spencer	6^{5}	3
ALT	(Germany) L Burgsmüller (Australia) T Perry	5	6^{0}
WC	(United States) T Dent (United States) M Fish	7	7^{7}
(Brazil) A Sá (United States) G Weiner	1	7^{7}	6
(Israel) J Erlich (Netherlands) J Siemerink	6	6^{4}	4

Semifinals
1	(United States) B Bryan (United States) M Bryan	6	6
(South Africa) N Godwin (South Africa) R Koenig	3	4
WC	(United States) T Dent (United States) M Fish	4	6^{6}
(Brazil) A Sá (United States) G Weiner	6	7^{8}

Final
1	(United States) B Bryan (United States) M Bryan	6	7
(Brazil) A Sá (United States) G Weiner	3	5
