= Kristian Capalik =

Bosnian American actor and tennis player

- Country (sports): Bosnia and Herzegovina (1997–August 2001); United States (August 2001–August 2002)
- Residence: Santa Monica, California
- Born: October 3, 1978 (age 46); Sarajevo, SR Bosnia and Herzegovina, SFR Yugoslavia
- Height: 6 ft 2 in (188 cm)
- Plays: Right-handed
- Prize money: $69,855

Singles
- Career record: 3–5 (ATP Tour)
- Highest ranking: No. 272 (May 13, 2002)

Doubles
- Highest ranking: No. 324 (March 18, 2002)

Kristian Capalik (born Kristijan Čapalik, October 3, 1978) is a Bosnian American actor and former professional tennis player.

== Early life ==
Capalik was born in Sarajevo, the capital of Bosnia and Herzegovina and then part of Yugoslavia. His Bosnian Croat father and Bosnian Serb mother owned and operated casinos, which would be destroyed in the war. The family left the city on April 4, 1992 and sought refuge in the Netherlands, where Kristian's grandmother lived. Later in the year, Kristian and his brother Alen, who was also a tennis player, immigrated to the United States. Alen went to Philadelphia and Kristian was accepted into the Palmer Tennis Academy in Tampa.

== Tennis career ==
=== Juniors ===
Capalik was a doubles finalist at the 1996 Orange Bowl junior tournament, partnering Slovenian Miha Gregorc. They were beaten in the final by the Czech pairing of Petr Kralert and Robin Vik. Also that year he won the Port Washington Tennis Academy's International Junior Championships and was runner-up at the USTA Junior International Grass Court Championships in Philadelphia and a losing finalist at the South American Banana Bowl competition.

=== Professional ===
In 1998, Capalik appeared in five Davis Cup ties for the Bosnia and Herzegovina team, all of which were played in Togo. He won five of his eight rubbers, three in singles and two in doubles.

He played his first ATP Tour tournament in 2000, the Legg Mason Tennis Classic, held in Washington, D.C. After beating Michael Russell in the opening round, Capalik faced world number 47 Karol Kučera and won the first set. In the second set he was up 5–1 and made it to match point, but Kucera came back and won in three sets.

Capalik reached the quarter-finals of the Miller Lite Hall of Fame Championships at Newport in 2001, with wins over Justin Gimelstob and fellow qualifier Jeff Salzenstein. He was eliminated from the tournament by James Blake.

He was unable to make it past the first round at either the 2001 Heineken Trophy or 2001 Legg Mason Tennis Classic, losing to Guillermo Cañas and Paradorn Srichaphan respectively. In Houston the following year he took part in the U.S. Men's Clay Court Championships but also lost in the opening round, to Spaniard Álex Calatrava.

On the ATP Challenger circuit, Capalik made four singles quarter-finals and five doubles semi-finals.

== Filmography ==
Year	Title	Role
2004	Asleep at the Wheel on the Road to Nowhere (short)	Male backpacker
2006	Shamelove	Jeff
2007	AfterThought	Kyle Walker
2007	Someone to Love (short)	Dan
2014	Break Point	Freddie Mercury Look-alike

== Television roles ==
Year	Title	Role	Episode
2005	Medical Investigation	SWAT Team member	Black Book
2010	Cougar Town	Alex	All the Wrong Reasons
