= 2006 Campbell's Hall of Fame Tennis Championships – Singles =

Singles
- 2006 Campbell's Hall of Fame Tennis Championships

Final
- Champion: (Australia) Mark Philippoussis
- Runner-up: (United States) Justin Gimelstob
- Score: 6–3, 7–5

Events
Singles	Doubles
- Campbell's Hall of Fame Tennis Championships

Greg Rusedski was the defending champion, but did not participate.

Mark Philippoussis defeated Justin Gimelstob in the final 6–3, 7–5.

== Seeds ==
1. (United Kingdom) Andy Murray (semifinals)
2. (Croatia) Ivo Karlović (first round, retired)
3. (United States) Paul Goldstein (first round)
4. (Luxembourg) Gilles Müller (first round)
5. (United States) Vince Spadea (first round)
6. (Austria) Jürgen Melzer (semifinals)
7. (United States) Mardy Fish (quarterfinals)
8. (United States) Justin Gimelstob (final)

== Draw ==
Key

- Q = Qualifier
- WC = Wild card
- LL = Lucky loser
- Alt = Alternate
- ITF = ITF entry
- PR = Protected ranking
- SR = Special ranking
- SE = Special exempt
- JE = Junior exempt
- JR = Junior Accelerator Programme entrant
- CO = College Accelerator Programme entrant
- NG = Next Gen Accelerator Program entrant
- w/o = Walkover
- r = Retired
- d = Defaulted

=== Finals ===
Semifinals
1	(United Kingdom) Andy Murray	1	6^{4}
8	(United States) Justin Gimelstob	6	7^{7}
WC	(Australia) Mark Philippoussis	6^{2}	6	6
6	(Austria) Jürgen Melzer	7^{7}	2	0

Final
8	(United States) Justin Gimelstob	3	5
WC	(Australia) Mark Philippoussis	6	7

=== Top half ===
First round
1	(United Kingdom) A Murray	6	1	7^{7}
(Brazil) R Mello	1	6	6^{5}
(Thailand) D Udomchoke	4	3
WC	(United States) S Querrey	6	6
(United States) B Reynolds	5	2
(Russia) I Kunitsyn	7	6
WC	(United States) R Kendrick	6	3	6
5	(United States) V Spadea	4	6	3
4	(Luxembourg) G Müller	6^{7}	2
(Chile) P Capdeville	7^{9}	6
Q	(United States) M Russell	6^{2}	r
(Denmark) K Pless	7^{7}
Q	(Australia) W Arthurs	7^{7}	7^{8}
(Denmark) K Carlsen	6^{5}	6^{6}
Q	(South Africa) W Whitehouse	6	3	4
8	(United States) J Gimelstob	4	6	6

Second round
1	(United Kingdom) A Murray	7	6
WC	(United States) S Querrey	5	2
(Russia) I Kunitsyn	4	2
WC	(United States) R Kendrick	6	6
(Chile) P Capdeville	4	6	4
(Denmark) K Pless	6	4	6
Q	(Australia) W Arthurs	3	6^{1}
8	(United States) J Gimelstob	6	7^{7}

Quarterfinals
1	(United Kingdom) A Murray	6	6
WC	(United States) R Kendrick	0	0
(Denmark) K Pless	3	1
8	(United States) J Gimelstob	6	6

Semifinals
1	(United Kingdom) A Murray	1	6^{4}
8	(United States) J Gimelstob	6	7^{7}

=== Bottom half ===
First round
7	(United States) M Fish	6	6
(France) C Saulnier	3	1
(Germany) T Behrend	4	4
(Brazil) T Alves	6	6
(Poland) Ł Kubot	2	2
(South Africa) R de Voest	6	6
WC	(Australia) M Philippoussis	6	6
3	(United States) P Goldstein	4	2
6	(Austria) J Melzer	7	7
(Romania) R Sabău	5	5
(Canada) F Dancevic	6	6
(United States) K Kim	4	3
(United Kingdom) A Bogdanovic	6	7
Q	(United States) J Levine	4	5
(Switzerland) G Bastl	6^{4}	6	4
2	(Croatia) I Karlović	7^{7}	4	2^{r}

Second round
7	(United States) M Fish	6	6
(Brazil) T Alves	2	3
(South Africa) R de Voest	3	4
WC	(Australia) M Philippoussis	6	6
6	(Austria) J Melzer	6	3	6
(Canada) F Dancevic	4	6	4
(United Kingdom) A Bogdanovic	6	7^{8}
(Switzerland) G Bastl	1	6^{6}

Quarterfinals
7	(United States) M Fish	6^{7}	3
WC	(Australia) M Philippoussis	7^{9}	6
6	(Austria) J Melzer	3	6	6
(United Kingdom) A Bogdanovic	6	2	1

Semifinals
WC	(Australia) M Philippoussis	6^{2}	6	6
6	(Austria) J Melzer	7^{7}	2	0
