= Internationaux du Doubs – Open de Franche-Comté =

Defunct tennis tournament
- Founded: 1996
- Abolished: 2009
- Editions: 12
- Location: Thise, France
- Venue: Pôle Espoir Trébignon
- Category: ATP Challenger Tour
- Surface: Hard (i)
- Draw: 32S/28Q/16D
- Website: Official Website

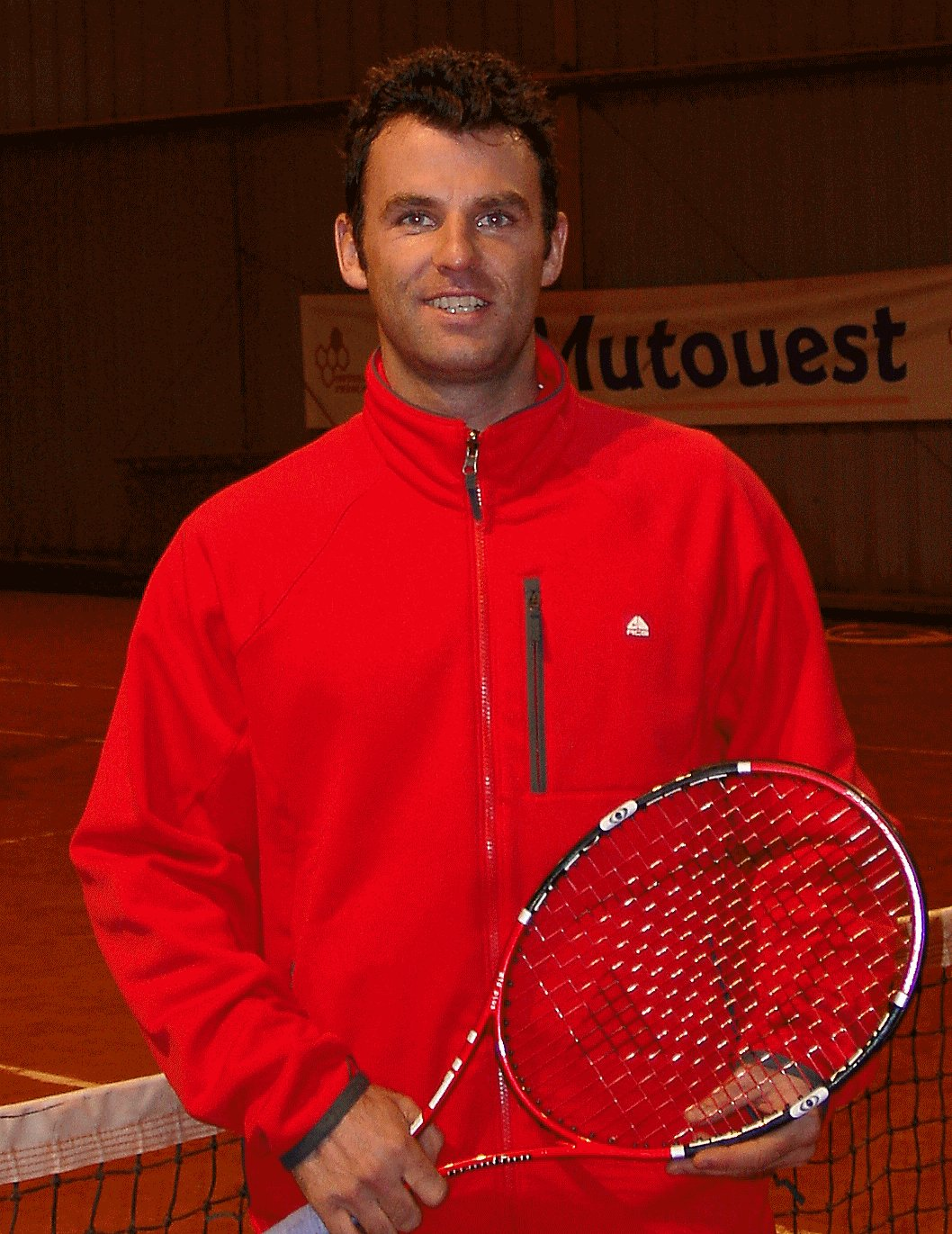
Marc Gicquel was one of seven Frenchmen to take the singles in the event's twelve editions (one of five in the event's nine editions as a Challenger)

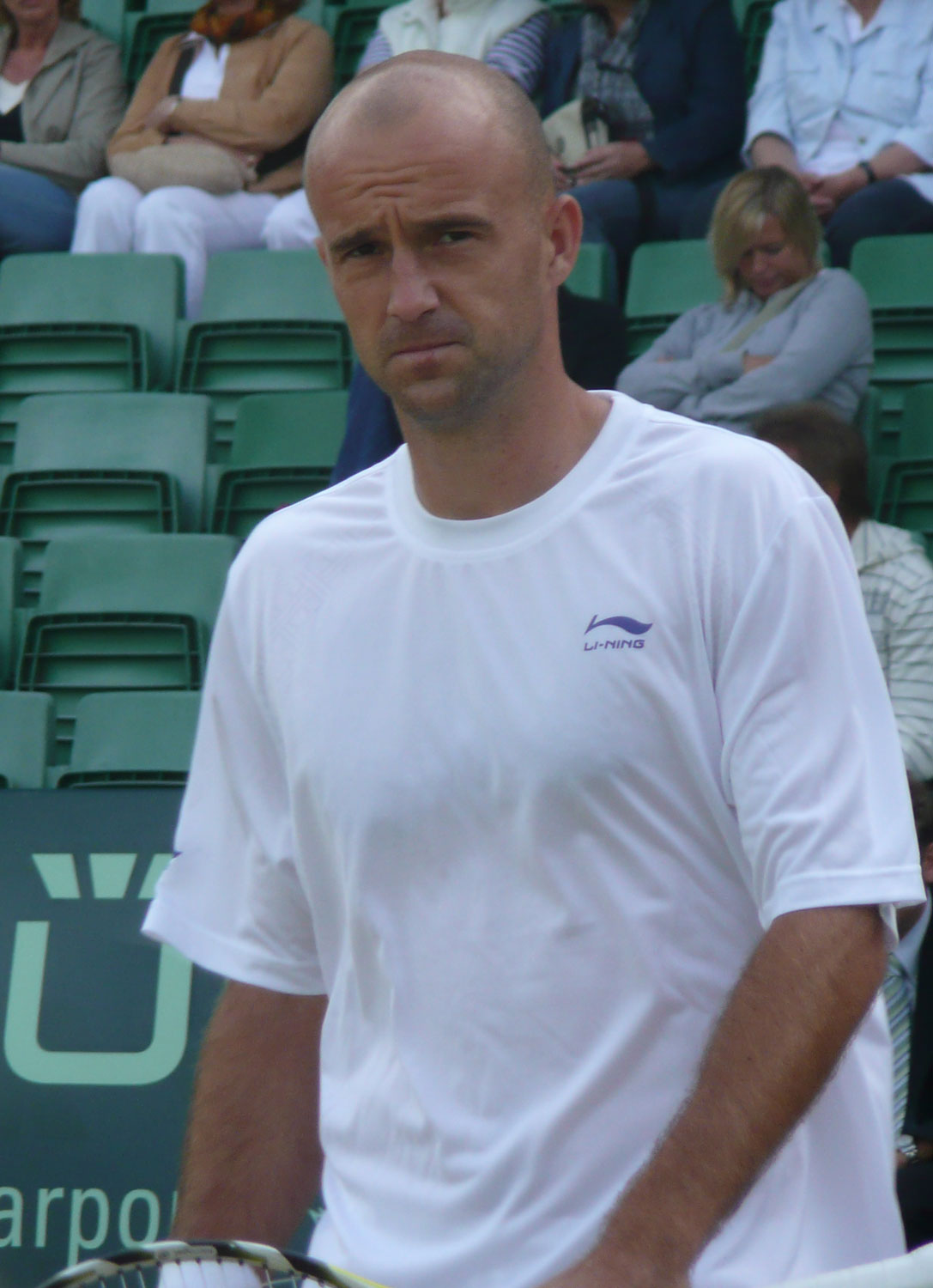
Croat Ivan Ljubičić was the first player to win the singles title after the event became a Challenger tournament

The Internationaux du Doubs – Open de Franche-Comté was a professional tennis tournament played on indoor hard courts. It was part of the ATP Challenger Series (renamed the ATP Challenger Tour in 2009). It was held annually in Thise near Besançon, France, as a Satellite from 1996 to 1998 and as a Challenger from 1999 until 2009. In 2010 was cancelled due to budget reasons.

There are three title holders, each with two doubles titles, Lionel Barthez, Christopher Kas and Philipp Petzschner. Only one player, Julien Boutter, won both singles and doubles titles the same year.

== Past finals ==
=== Singles ===
Year	Champion	Runner-up	Score
2009	(Belgium) Kristof Vliegen	(Germany) Andreas Beck	6–2, 6–7(6), 6–3
2008	(France) Marc Gicquel	(Austria) Alexander Peya	7–6(2), 6–4
2007	(Latvia) Ernests Gulbis	(France) Édouard Roger-Vasselin	6–4, 3–6, 6–4
2006	(France) Nicolas Mahut	(Canada) Frank Dancevic	6–3, 6–4
2005	(France) Gaël Monfils	(Belgium) Christophe Rochus	6–3, 2–6, 6–3
2004	(Czech Republic) Tomáš Berdych	(France) Julien Benneteau	6–3, 6–1
2003	(France) Cyril Saulnier	(United States) Eric Taino	7–6(8), 6–4
2002	Not held		
2001	Not held		
2000	(France) Julien Boutter	(Austria) Julian Knowle	6–4, 7–6(4)
1999	(Croatia) Ivan Ljubičić	(France) Lionel Roux	6–4, 6–2
1998	(France) Nicolas Thomann	(France) Nicolas Guillaume	6–3, 3–6, 6–2
1997	(France) Sébastien Grosjean	(France) Nicolas Thomann	2–6, 7–5, 6–4
1996	(North Macedonia) Aleksandar Kitinov	(France) Lionel Barthez	6–4, 6–4

=== Doubles ===
Year	Champions	Runners-up	Score
2009	(Slovakia) Karol Beck (Czech Republic) Jaroslav Levinský	(Czech Republic) David Škoch (Slovakia) Igor Zelenay	2–6, 7–5, 10–7
2008	(Germany) Philipp Petzschner (2) (Austria) Alexander Peya	(Switzerland) Yves Allegro (Romania) Horia Tecău	6–3, 6–1
2007	(Germany) Christopher Kas (2) (Austria) Alexander Peya	(France) Grégory Carraz (Luxembourg) Gilles Müller	6–4, 6–4
2006	(Germany) Christopher Kas (1) (Germany) Philipp Petzschner (1)	(Switzerland) Jean-Claude Scherrer (Croatia) Lovro Zovko	6–2, 6–2
2005	(United States) Jason Marshall (United States) Huntley Montgomery	(Slovakia) Michal Mertiňák (Switzerland) Jean-Claude Scherrer	6–7(7), 6–2, 6–3
2004	(Germany) Alexander Waske (Netherlands) Rogier Wassen	(Denmark) Kenneth Carlsen (Belgium) Gilles Elseneer	3–6, 7–5, 6–3
2003	(Israel) Jonathan Erlich (Austria) Julian Knowle	(France) Richard Gasquet (France) Nicolas Mahut	6–3, 6–4
2002	Not held		
2001	Not held		
2000	(France) Julien Boutter (France) Michaël Llodra	(Italy) Stefano Pescosolido (Italy) Vincenzo Santopadre	6–4, 6–7(6), 7–6(5)
1999	(Spain) Juan Ignacio Carrasco (Spain) Jairo Velasco, Jr.	(Argentina) Martín García (Brazil) Cristiano Testa	6–1, 7–6
1998	(South Africa) Justin Bower (Federal Republic of Yugoslavia) Nenad Zimonjić	(Sweden) Henrik Andersson (Czech Republic) Radek Štěpánek	w/o
1997	(France) Lionel Barthez (2) (France) Grégory Carraz	(Switzerland) Ivo Heuberger (Switzerland) Alexandre Strambini	3–6, 6–3, 7–6
1996	(France) Lionel Barthez (1) (France) Stéphane Simian	(United States) Wade McGuire (United States) Michael Sell	6–3, 6–7, 6–4
