= 2001 Miller Lite Hall of Fame Championships =

- Date: July 9–15
- Edition: 26th
- Category: ATP International Series
- Draw: 32S / 16D
- Prize money: $350,000
- Surface: Grass / outdoor
- Location: Newport, Rhode Island, US
- Venue: Newport Casino

Champions

Singles
- (South Africa) Neville Godwin

Doubles
- (United States) Bob Bryan / (United States) Mike Bryan
← 2000 ·	Hall of Fame Open	· 2002 →

The 2001 Miller Lite Hall of Fame Championships was a men's tennis tournament played on grass courts at the International Tennis Hall of Fame in Newport, Rhode Island in the United States and was part of the International Series of the 2001 ATP Tour. It was the 26th edition of the tournament and ran from July 9 through July 15, 2001.

== Finals ==
=== Singles ===
(South Africa) Neville Godwin defeated (United Kingdom) Martin Lee 6–1, 6–4

- It was Godwin's only title of the year and the 1st of his career.

=== Doubles ===
(United States) Bob Bryan / (United States) Mike Bryan defeated (Brazil) André Sá / (United States) Glenn Weiner 6–3, 7–5

- It was Bob Bryan's 3rd title of the year and the 3rd of his career. It was Mike Bryan's 3rd title of the year and the 3rd of his career.
