= 2004 Hall of Fame Tennis Championships =

- Date: July 5–11
- Edition: 28th
- Category: ATP International Series
- Draw: 32S / 16D
- Prize money: $355,000
- Surface: Grass / outdoor
- Location: Newport, Rhode Island, US
- Venue: Newport Casino

Champions

Singles
- (United Kingdom) Greg Rusedski

Doubles
- (Australia) Jordan Kerr / (United States) Jim Thomas
- Hall of Fame Open

The 2004 Hall of Fame Tennis Championships (also known as 2004 Miller Lite Hall of Fame Championships for sponsorship reasons) was a tennis tournament played on grass courts at the International Tennis Hall of Fame in Newport, Rhode Island in the United States and was part of the ATP International Series of the 2004 ATP Tour. It was the 28th edition of the tournament and was held from July 5 through July 11, 2004.

== Finals ==
=== Singles ===
(United Kingdom) Greg Rusedski defeated (Germany) Alexander Popp 7–6^{(7–2)}, 7–6^{(7–2)}

- It was Rusedski's only singles title of the year and the 14th of his career.

=== Doubles ===
(Australia) Jordan Kerr / (United States) Jim Thomas defeated (France) Grégory Carraz / (France) Nicolas Mahut 6–3, 6–7^{(5–7)}, 6–3
