= Justin Bower =

South African tennis player

- Country (sports): South Africa
- Residence: United States
- Born: 23 May 1978 (age 46); Johannesburg, South Africa
- Height: 1.91 m (6 ft 3 in)
- Plays: Left-handed
- Prize money: $166,067

Singles
- Career record: 2–7
- Career titles: 0
- Highest ranking: No. 180 (18 June 2001)

Grand Slam singles results
- Australian Open: 1R (1999)
- Wimbledon: 2R (2000)

Doubles
- Highest ranking: No. 170 (30 September 2002)

Justin D. Bower (born 23 May 1978) is a former professional tennis player from Johannesburg, South Africa.

== Career ==
Bower took part in the main draw of three Grand Slam tournaments during his career. He first appeared at the 1999 Australian Open, where he lost in the opening round to Andrei Medvedev. In the 2000 Wimbledon Championships he defeated Davide Sanguinetti in the first round, then lost to fourth seed Gustavo Kuerten. He returned to Wimbledon two years later and got beaten in five sets by Stefan Koubek in the first round.

The South African appeared in four Davis Cup ties for his country. He won two of his seven singles rubbers, which were against Janko Tipsarević in 2001 and Vladimir Obradović the following year.

He is a former co-owner of a tennis academy in Redmond, Washington, the Redmond Tennis Club.

In 2020, Bower published his first book, Mentally Tough Me.

== Challenger titles ==
=== Doubles: (3) ===
No.	Year	Tournament	Surface	Partner	Opponents	Score
1.	2000	Binghamton, United States	Hard	(South Africa) Jeff Coetzee	(Switzerland) Lorenzo Manta (Italy) Laurence Tieleman	6–3, 7–5
2.	2002	Gosford, Australia	Hard	(Switzerland) Yves Allegro	(Republic of Ireland) John Doran (Australia) Andrew Painter	7–6^{(9–7)}, 3–6, 7–6^{(7–5)}
3.	2003	Fergana, Uzbekistan	Hard	(Pakistan) Aisam-ul-Haq Qureshi	(Kazakhstan) Alexey Kedryuk (Ukraine) Orest Tereshchuk	3–6, 7–6^{(7–0)}, 6–4
