= Alexander Popp =

German tennis player

- Country (sports): Germany
- Born: 4 November 1976 (age 49) Heidelberg, West Germany
- Height: 2.01 m (6 ft 7 in)
- Turned pro: 1997
- Retired: 2005
- Plays: Right-handed (two-handed backhand)
- Prize money: $976,038

Singles
- Career record: 45–65
- Career titles: 0
- Highest ranking: No. 74 (10 July 2000)

Grand Slam singles results
- Australian Open: 2R (2001)
- French Open: 1R (2000, 2001, 2002, 2003, 2004, 2005)
- Wimbledon: QF (2000, 2003)
- US Open: 2R (2000, 2002)

Doubles
- Career record: 5–6
- Career titles: 0
- Highest ranking: No. 266 (15 July 2002)
- Last updated on: 1 February 2022.

Alexander Popp (born 4 November 1976) is a former German professional tennis player. He reached the quarterfinals of Wimbledon in 2000 and 2003.

== Personal life ==
Popp was born in Heidelberg to parents Rainer and Jennifer, and started playing tennis at the age of 8. He was coached by Helmut Luthy, from 1994 until retirement. He holds a British passport through his mother, who was born in Wolverhampton.

== Tennis career ==
Popp turned professional in 1997 at the age of 21.

Popp's career highlights are making the quarterfinals of Wimbledon (by far his most successful tournament) in 2000 (defeating Gustavo Kuerten and Michael Chang en route), and in 2003 (defeating Jiří Novák). He also reached the fourth round in 2004, losing to the eventual runner-up in each of these three runs (Patrick Rafter, Mark Philippoussis and Andy Roddick respectively), and the third round in 2005. Popp also reached the final of Newport in 2004 and achieved a career-high singles ranking of World No. 74.

In doubles, Popp made the final of Newport in 2002 (partnering Jürgen Melzer) and the semifinals of the Ho Chi Minh City championships in 2005 (partnering Jiří Vaněk).

== ATP career finals ==
=== Singles: 1 (1 runner-up) ===
Legend Grand Slam Tournaments (0–0) ATP World Tour Finals (0–0) ATP Masters Series (0–0) ATP Championship Series (0–0) ATP International Series (0–1)	Finals by surface Hard (0–0) Clay (0–0) Grass (0–1) Carpet (0–0)	Finals by setting Outdoors (0–1) Indoors (0–0)

Result	W–L	Date	Tournament	Tier	Surface	Opponent	Score
Loss	0–1	Jul 2004	Newport, United States	International Series	Grass	(United Kingdom) Greg Rusedski	6–7^{(5–7)}, 6–7^{(2–7)}

=== Doubles: 1 (1 runner-up) ===
Legend Grand Slam Tournaments (0–0) ATP World Tour Finals (0–0) ATP Masters Series (0–0) ATP Championship Series (0–0) ATP International Series (0–1)	Finals by surface Hard (0–0) Clay (0–0) Grass (0–1) Carpet (0–0)	Finals by setting Outdoors (0–1) Indoors (0–0)

Result	W–L	Date	Tournament	Tier	Surface	Partner	Opponents	Score
Loss	0–1	Jul 2002	Newport, United States	International Series	Grass	(Austria) Jurgen Melzer	(United States) Bob Bryan (United States) Mike Bryan	5–7, 3–6

== ATP Challenger and ITF Futures finals ==
=== Singles: 16 (13–3) ===
Legend ATP Challenger (6–1) ITF Futures (7–2)	Finals by surface Hard (4–1) Clay (3–1) Grass (0–0) Carpet (6–1)

Result	W–L	Date	Tournament	Tier	Surface	Opponent	Score
Win	1–0	Aug 1998	Latvia F1, Jūrmala	Futures	Clay	(Finland) Janne Ojala	6–4, 6–3
Win	2–0	Oct 1998	Great Britain F8, Glasgow	Futures	Hard	(Germany) Andreas Weber	3–6, 6–3, 6–2
Win	3–0	Oct 1998	Great Britain F9, Leeds	Futures	Hard	(Slovakia) Roman Smotlak	6–2, 3–6, 6–3
Win	4–0	Oct 1998	Great Britain F10, Edinburgh	Futures	Hard	(Germany) Markus Menzler	6–2, 6–3
Loss	4–1	Nov 1998	USA F9, Tucson	Futures	Hard	(Venezuela) Kepler Orellana	3–6, 6–4, 0–6
Win	5–1	Feb 1999	Great Britain F1, Leeds	Futures	Carpet	(Austria) Julian Knowle	7–6, 6–2
Win	6–1	Apr 1999	France F4, Clermont-Ferrand	Futures	Carpet	(Germany) Jan-Ralph Brandt	2–6, 6–2, 6–2
Loss	6–2	May 1999	Germany F2, Schwäbisch Hall	Futures	Clay	(Poland) Bartlomiej Dabrowski	7–5, 6–7, 4–6
Win	7–2	May 1999	Germany F3, Neckarau	Futures	Clay	(Sweden) Johan Settergren	6–2, 6–1
Win	8–2	May 1999	Oberstaufen, Germany	Challenger	Clay	(Brazil) Francisco Costa	7–6, 6–3
Win	9–2	Aug 1999	Bronx, United States	Challenger	Hard	(France) Sebastien de Chaunac	6–7^{(4–7)}, 7–6^{(7–4)}, 6–0
Win	10–2	Feb 2000	Hamburg, Germany	Challenger	Carpet	(Germany) Andy Fahlke	6–3, 6–2
Win	11–2	Nov 2001	Aachen, Germany	Challenger	Carpet	(Germany) Axel Pretzsch	6–3, 1–6, 6–2
Win	12–2	Nov 2001	Eckental, Germany	Challenger	Carpet	(Netherlands) Peter Wessels	6–4, 5–7, 6–2
Win	13–2	Jan 2002	Heilbronn, Germany	Challenger	Carpet	(Austria) Jürgen Melzer	3–6, 6–3, 6–4
Loss	13–3	Feb 2002	Lübeck, Germany	Challenger	Carpet	(Netherlands) Raemon Sluiter	2–6, 0–3 ret.

=== Doubles: 2 (2–0) ===
Legend ATP Challenger (1–0) ITF Futures (1–0)	Finals by surface Hard (2–0) Clay (0–0) Grass (0–0) Carpet (0–0)

Result	W–L	Date	Tournament	Tier	Surface	Partner	Opponents	Score
Win	1–0	Oct 1998	Great Britain F9, Leeds	Futures	Hard	(United Kingdom) Iain Bates	(France) Jean-Rene Lisnard (Australia) Ashley Naumann	6–4, 4–6, 6–4
Win	2–0	Aug 2001	Wrexham, United Kingdom	Challenger	Hard	(Belgium) Gilles Elseneer	(Australia) Luke Bourgeois (Pakistan) Aisam Qureshi	5–7, 7–5, 6–2

== Performance timeline ==
Key
W	F	SF	QF	#R	RR	Q#	DNQ	A	NH

(W) winner; (F) finalist; (SF) semifinalist; (QF) quarterfinalist; (#R) rounds 4, 3, 2, 1; (RR) round-robin stage; (Q#) qualification round; (DNQ) did not qualify; (A) absent; (NH) not held; (SR) strike rate (events won / competed); (W–L) win–loss record.

=== Singles ===
Tournament	1999	2000	2001	2002	2003	2004	2005	SR	W–L	Win %
Grand Slam tournaments
Australian Open	A	A	2R	A	A	1R	A	0 / 2	1–2	33%
French Open	A	1R	1R	1R	1R	1R	1R	0 / 6	0–6	0%
Wimbledon	A	QF	A	A	QF	4R	3R	0 / 4	13–4	76%
US Open	Q1	2R	Q1	2R	1R	1R	1R	0 / 5	2–5	29%
Win–loss	0–0	5–3	1–2	1–2	4–3	3–4	2–3	0 / 17	16–17	48%
ATP Masters Series
Hamburg	A	A	A	A	A	A	Q1	0 / 0	0–0	–
Cincinnati	A	A	A	A	Q2	A	A	0 / 0	0–0	–
Win–loss	0–0	0–0	0–0	0–0	0–0	0–0	0–0	0 / 0	0–0	–
