= Gilles Elseneer =

Belgian tennis player

- Country (sports): Belgium
- Residence: Brussels, Belgium
- Born: 6 March 1978 (age 47); Brussels, Belgium
- Height: 1.88 m (6 ft 2 in)
- Turned pro: 1998
- Retired: 2007
- Plays: Right-handed (two-handed backhand)
- Prize money: $477,809

Singles
- Career record: 18–24
- Career titles: 0
- Highest ranking: No. 97 (12 July 2004)

Grand Slam singles results
- Australian Open: Q1 (2002, 2004)
- French Open: 2R (2004)
- Wimbledon: 2R (2003, 2004, 2005)
- US Open: 1R (2004, 2005)

Doubles
- Career record: 3–5
- Career titles: 0
- Highest ranking: No. 177 (2 August 2004)

Grand Slam doubles results
- Wimbledon: Q2 (2002)
- Last updated on: 27 July 2022.

Gilles Valere Jacque Elseneer (born 6 March 1978 in Brussels) is a retired professional tennis player from Belgium. He is mostly known for his grass court game, and has achieved his best results on this surface, including a quarterfinal appearance at 's-Hertogenbosch in 2001.

== Tennis career ==
=== Pro tour ===
He reached his career-high singles ranking of world No. 97 in July 2004. This was arguably the strongest year of his career, in which he reached the second rounds of the French Open (l. to Gustavo Kuerten) and Wimbledon (l. to Ivo Karlović), and won the challengers of Heilbronn and Sarajevo.

Elseneer made a claim in September 2007 that he was offered money to throw a match against Potito Starace at Wimbledon 2005.

=== Coaching ===
He is now coaching and teaching tennis within his father's tennis academy (royal tennis club de Belgique) in Brussels.

== ATP Challenger and ITF Futures finals ==
=== Singles: 9 (6–3) ===
Legend ATP Challenger (4–2) ITF Futures (2–1)	Finals by surface Hard (4–2) Clay (0–0) Grass (0–0) Carpet (2–1)

Result	W–L	Date	Tournament	Tier	Surface	Opponent	Score
Win	1–0	Feb 2000	Great Britain F2, Chigwell	Futures	Carpet	(United Kingdom) Arvind Parmar	7–6^{(7–5)}, 6–4
Loss	1–1	Jun 2000	Ireland F2, Dublin	Futures	Carpet	(Republic of Ireland) Owen Casey	3–6, 6–7^{(5–7)}
Win	2–1	Oct 2000	France F22, Saint-Dizier	Futures	Hard	(Belgium) Timothy Aerts	6–2, 6–2
Win	3–1	Nov 2002	Nottingham, United Kingdom	Challenger	Hard	(United Kingdom) Arvind Parmar	7–5, 6–2
Loss	3–2	Apr 2003	Bangalore, India	Challenger	Hard	(France) Gregory Carraz	4–6, 6–7^{(4–7)}
Loss	3–3	Jul 2003	Manchester, United Kingdom	Challenger	Hard	(France) Nicolas Mahut	3–6, 6–7^{(5–7)}
Win	4–3	Feb 2004	Heilbronn, Germany	Challenger	Carpet	(Germany) Lars Burgsmüller	3–6, 6–3, 7–6^{(7–5)}
Win	5–3	Mar 2004	Sarajevo, Bosnia & Herzegovina	Challenger	Hard	(Netherlands) Dennis Van Scheppingen	7–6^{(7–5)}, 6–2
Win	6–3	Feb 2006	Andrézieux, France	Challenger	Hard	(France) Gilles Simon	4–6, 6–1, 6–4

=== Doubles: 13 (8–5) ===
Legend ATP Challenger (3–3) ITF Futures (5–2)	Finals by surface Hard (3–2) Clay (0–1) Grass (0–1) Carpet (5–1)

Result	W–L	Date	Tournament	Tier	Surface	Partner	Opponents	Score
Win	1–0	Jan 1998	Greece F4, Corfu	Futures	Carpet	(Belgium) Wim Neefs	(Greece) Niko Karagiannis (Greece) Anastasios Vasiliadis	6–4, 6–2
Loss	1–1	Jul 1998	Greece F7, Athens	Futures	Clay	(Belgium) Wim Neefs	(Israel) Harel Levy (Israel) Lior Mor	3–6, 6–0, 3–6
Win	2–1	Apr 1999	France F4, Clermont-Ferrand	Futures	Carpet	(Austria) Gerald Mandl	(Sweden) Daniel Pahlsson (Australia) Steven Randjelovic	7–6, 7–6
Loss	2–2	May 1999	Greece F2, Filippiada	Futures	Hard	(Israel) Eyal Erlich	(Germany) Jan-Ralph Brandt (Germany) Markus Menzler	7–6, 4–6, 4–6
Win	3–2	Mar 2000	France F6, Douai	Futures	Carpet	(Belgium) Arnaud Fontaine	(Israel) Andy Ram (Croatia) Lovro Zovko	6–1, 6–4
Win	4–2	Jun 2000	Ireland F1, Dublin	Futures	Carpet	(France) Jean-Michel Pequery	(Finland) Jarkko Nieminen (Denmark) Kristian Pless	7–6^{(7–2)}, 4–6, 6–3
Loss	4–3	Jul 2001	Bristol, United Kingdom	Challenger	Grass	(Finland) Tuomas Ketola	(South Africa) Wesley Moodie (South Africa) Shaun Rudman	4–6, 3–6
Win	5–3	Aug 2001	Wrexham, United Kingdom	Challenger	Hard	(Germany) Alexander Popp	(Australia) Luke Bourgeois (Pakistan) Aisam Qureshi	5–7, 7–5, 6–2
Win	6–3	Sep 2001	France F17, Plaisir	Futures	Hard	(Belgium) Wim Neefs	(Canada) Frédéric Niemeyer (Canada) Andrew Nisker	6–3, 6–7^{(3–7)}, 6–4
Win	7–3	Nov 2001	Bolton, United Kingdom	Challenger	Hard	(Belgium) Wim Neefs	(United Kingdom) Lee Childs (United Kingdom) Mark Hilton	6–4, 6–3
Win	8–3	Feb 2002	Hull, United Kingdom	Challenger	Carpet	(Canada) Frédéric Niemeyer	(Switzerland) Yves Allegro (South Africa) Wesley Moodie	6–4, 6–4
Loss	8–4	Mar 2004	Besançon, France	Challenger	Hard	(Denmark) Kenneth Carlsen	(Germany) Alexander Waske (Netherlands) Rogier Wassen	6–3, 5–7, 3–6
Loss	8–5	Jan 2005	Heilbronn, Germany	Challenger	Carpet	(Luxembourg) Gilles Müller	(France) Sébastien de Chaunac (Slovakia) Michal Mertiňák	2–6, 6–3, 3–6

== Performance timeline ==
Key
W	F	SF	QF	#R	RR	Q#	P#	DNQ	A	Z#	PO	G	S	B	NMS	NTI	P	NH

(W) winner; (F) finalist; (SF) semifinalist; (QF) quarterfinalist; (#R) rounds 4, 3, 2, 1; (RR) round-robin stage; (Q#) qualification round; (P#) preliminary round; (DNQ) did not qualify; (A) absent; (Z#) Davis/Fed Cup Zonal Group (with number indication) or (PO) play-off; (G) gold, (S) silver or (B) bronze Olympic/Paralympic medal; (NMS) not a Masters tournament; (NTI) not a Tier I tournament; (P) postponed; (NH) not held; (SR) strike rate (events won / competed); (W–L) win–loss record.

=== Singles ===
Tournament	1999	2000	2001	2002	2003	2004	2005	2006	SR	W–L	Win%
Grand Slam tournaments
Australian Open	A	A	A	Q1	A	Q1	A	A	0 / 0	0–0	–
French Open	A	A	A	Q1	Q2	2R	Q1	Q1	0 / 1	1–1	50%
Wimbledon	Q2	A	A	Q3	2R	2R	2R	Q2	0 / 3	3–3	50%
US Open	A	A	Q2	Q1	Q1	1R	1R	Q2	0 / 2	0–2	0%
Win–loss	0–0	0–0	0–0	0–0	1–1	2–3	1–2	0–0	0 / 6	4–6	40%
ATP Tour Masters 1000
Rome	A	A	A	A	A	Q1	A	Q1	0 / 0	0–0	–
Win–loss	0–0	0–0	0–0	0–0	0–0	0–0	0–0	0–0	0 / 0	0–0	–
