= Grégory Carraz =

French tennis player

- Country (sports): France
- Residence: Boulogne-Billancourt, France
- Born: 9 April 1975 (age 49); Bourgoin-Jallieu, France
- Height: 1.90 m (6 ft 3 in)
- Turned pro: 1993
- Retired: 2007
- Plays: Right-handed (one-handed backhand)
- Prize money: $836,734

Singles
- Career record: 35–54 (at ATP Tour level, Grand Slam level, and in Davis Cup)
- Career titles: 0
- Highest ranking: No. 54 (1 March 2004)

Grand Slam singles results
- Australian Open: 2R (2005)
- French Open: 1R (1996)
- Wimbledon: 2R (2002, 2004)
- US Open: 3R (2003)

Doubles
- Career record: 10–25 (at ATP Tour level, Grand Slam level, and in Davis Cup)
- Career titles: 0
- Highest ranking: No. 122 (13 September 2004)

Grand Slam doubles results
- French Open: 2R (2005)
- US Open: 1R (2004)

Grégory Carraz (French: [ɡʁeɡɔʁi kaʁaz]; born 9 April 1975) is a retired professional French tennis player. During his career, he reached one ATP Tour doubles final.

== Career finals ==
=== Doubles: 1 (1 runner-up) ===
Legend Grand Slam tournaments (0–0) Tennis Masters Cup (0–0) ATP Masters Series (0–0) ATP International Series Gold (0–0) ATP International Series (0–1)	Titles by surface Hard (0–0) Clay (0–0) Grass (0–1)	Titles by setting Outdoor (0–1) Indoor (0–0)

Result	W–L	Date	Tournament	Tier	Surface	Partner	Opponents	Score
Loss	0–1	Jul 2004	Hall of Fame Tennis Championships, United States	Intl Series	Grass	(France) Nicolas Mahut	(Australia) Jordan Kerr (United States) Jim Thomas	3–6, 7–6^{(7–5)}, 3–6

== Challengers and Futures finals ==
=== Singles: 14 (7–7) ===
Legend (singles)
Challengers (2–3)
Futures (5–4)

Result	No.	Date	Tournament	Surface	Opponent	Score
Win	1.	22 April 1998	Bournemouth, United Kingdom	Clay	(Sweden) Kalle Flygt	6–3, 6–0
Loss	1.	15 March 1999	Douai, France	Carpet (i)	(France) Lionel Roux	2–6, 4–6
Win	2.	15 January 2001	Angers, France	Clay (i)	(Serbia and Montenegro) Relja Dulić Fišer	6–2, 6–1
Loss	2.	19 March 2001	Poitiers, France	Hard (i)	(Belgium) Dick Norman	3–6, 7–6^{5}, 4–6
Loss	3.	26 March 2001	Melun, France	Carpet (i)	(Belgium) Dick Norman	3–6, 2–6
Win	3.	29 October 2001	Rodez, France	Hard (i)	(France) Julien Couly	6–2, ^{7}6–7, 6–1
Win	4.	18 March 2002	Poitiers, France	Hard (i)	(Switzerland) Marco Chiudinelli	7–6^{8}, 6–2
Loss	4.	25 March 2002	Melun, France	Carpet (i)	(Switzerland) Roman Valent	3–6, 6–2, 4–6
Loss	5.	25 November 2002	Milan, Italy	Carpet (i)	(Croatia) Mario Ančić	6–4, 3–6, ^{8}6–7
Win	5.	21 April 2003	Bangalore, India	Hard	(Belgium) Gilles Elseneer	6–4, 7–6^{4}
Win	6.	23 June 2003	Andorra la Vella, Andorra	Hard	(Chinese Taipei) Yeu-Tzuoo Wang	6–2, 6–3
Loss	6.	22 November 2004	Luxembourg City, Luxembourg	Hard (i)	(Sweden) Joachim Johansson	^{3}6–7, 5–7
Loss	7.	25 July 2005	Granby, Canada	Hard	(Thailand) Danai Udomchoke	^{6}6–7, 6–2, ^{2}6–7
Win	7.	18 September 2006	Plaisir, France	Hard (i)	(France) Jo-Wilfried Tsonga	7–6^{7}, 6–1

=== Doubles: 13 (6–7) ===
Legend
Challengers (5–6)
Futures (1–1)

Result	No.	Date	Tournament	Surface	Partner	Opponents	Score
Loss	1.	15 March 1999	Douai, France	Carpet (i)	(Czech Republic) Ota Fukárek	(France) Jérôme Hanquez (France) Régis Lavergne	5–7, 4–6
Loss	2.	14 February 2000	Calcutta, India	Grass	(France) Guillaume Marx	(Israel) Andy Ram (Israel) Nir Welgreen	1–2, ret.
Win	1.	28 January 2002	Lübeck, Germany	Carpet (i)	(France) Nicolas Mahut	(Switzerland) Yves Allegro (Russia) Denis Golovanov	4–6, 7–6^{7}, 6–1
Win	2.	21 April 2003	Bangalore, India	Hard	(France) Rodolphe Cadart	(Switzerland) Yves Allegro (France) Jean-François Bachelot	6–4, 6–4
Loss	3.	3 June 2003	Surbiton, United Kingdom	Grass	(France) Jean-François Bachelot	(Australia) Joshua Eagle (Australia) Andrew Kratzmann	3–6, 2–6
Loss	4.	12 September 2005	Orléans, France	Hard (i)	(France) Antony Dupuis	(France) Julien Benneteau (France) Nicolas Mahut	6–3, 4–6, 2–6
Loss	5.	26 September 2005	Grenoble, France	Hard (i)	(France) Nicolas Tourte	(France) Julien Benneteau (France) Nicolas Mahut	6–4, 4–6, 3–6
Loss	6.	30 January 2006	Andrézieux, France	Hard (i)	(France) Antony Dupuis	(France) Julien Benneteau (France) Nicolas Mahut	4–6, 4–6
Win	3.	24 April 2006	Lanzarote, Spain	Hard	(France) Jean-Michel Pequery	(Germany) Benedikt Dorsch (Netherlands) Steven Korteling	6–3, 7–5
Win	4.	11 September 2006	Orléans, France	Hard (i)	(Belgium) Dick Norman	(France) Jérôme Haehnel (Monaco) Jean-René Lisnard	7–6^{6}, 6–1
Win	5.	9 October 2006	Rennes, France	Carpet (i)	(France) Mathieu Montcourt	(Poland) Tomasz Bednarek (Germany) Frank Moser	6–3, 3–6, [10–4]
Loss	7.	19 February 2007	Besançon, France	Hard (i)	(Luxembourg) Gilles Müller	(Germany) Christopher Kas (Austria) Alexander Peya	4–6, 4–6
Win	6.	12 March 2007	Lille, France	Hard (i)	(France) Alexandre Sidorenko	(Romania) Florin Mergea (United States) Brian Wilson	^{4}6–7, 6–4, 6–3
