= 2006 St. Petersburg Open – Doubles =

Doubles
- 2006 St. Petersburg Open

Final
- Champions: (Sweden) Simon Aspelin (Australia) Todd Perry
- Runners-up: (Austria) Julian Knowle (Austria) Jürgen Melzer
- Score: 6–1, 7–6^{(7–3)}

Events
Singles	Doubles
← 2005 ·	St. Petersburg Open	· 2007 →

Julian Knowle and Jürgen Melzer were the defending champions.

Simon Aspelin and Todd Perry won the title, defeating Knowle and Melzer 6–1, 7–6^{(7–3)} in the final.

== Seeds ==
1. (Sweden) Simon Aspelin / (Australia) Todd Perry (champions)
2. (Austria) Julian Knowle / (Austria) Jürgen Melzer (final)
3. (Sweden) Jonas Björkman / (Sweden) Thomas Johansson (first round)
4. (Russia) Mikhail Youzhny / (Serbia) Nenad Zimonjić (quarterfinals)

== Draw ==
=== Key ===
- Q = Qualifier
- WC = Wild card
- LL = Lucky loser
- Alt = Alternate
- SE = Special exempt
- PR = Protected ranking
- ITF = ITF entry
- JE = Junior exempt
- w/o = Walkover
- r = Retired
- d = Defaulted
- SR = Special ranking

=== Draw ===
First round
1	(Sweden) S Aspelin (Australia) T Perry	6	6
WC	(Russia) T Gabashvili (Russia) E Korolev	2	4
(Germany) R Schüttler (Serbia) J Tipsarević	4	0
(Poland) Ł Kubot (Czech Republic) D Škoch	6	6
3	(Sweden) J Björkman (Sweden) T Johansson	6	3	[11]
(Croatia) M Ančić (India) M Bhupathi	3	6	[13]
(Italy) D Bracciali (Romania) A Pavel	1	4
(Australia) S Huss (South Africa) W Moodie	6	6
(United States) P Goldstein (United States) J Thomas	6^{5}	3
(Australia) W Arthurs (United Kingdom) J Auckland	7^{7}	6
(Czech Republic) T Cibulec (Croatia) L Zovko	3	4
4	(Russia) M Youzhny (Serbia) N Zimonjić	6	6
(Czech Republic) L Dlouhý (Czech Republic) R Vik	6	6
(Russia) I Kunitsyn (Russia) D Tursunov	3	2
(Russia) A Chernov (Russia) V Rudnev	3	4
2	(Austria) J Knowle (Austria) J Melzer	6	6

Quarterfinals
1	(Sweden) S Aspelin (Australia) T Perry	7	6
(Poland) Ł Kubot (Czech Republic) D Škoch	5	1
(Croatia) M Ančić (India) M Bhupathi	6	6^{3}	[3]
(Australia) S Huss (South Africa) W Moodie	2	7^{7}	[10]
(Australia) W Arthurs (United Kingdom) J Auckland	3	4
4	(Russia) M Youzhny (Serbia) N Zimonjić	6	3^{r}
(Czech Republic) L Dlouhý (Czech Republic) R Vik	2	4
2	(Austria) J Knowle (Austria) J Melzer	6	6

Semifinals
1	(Sweden) S Aspelin (Australia) T Perry	3	7	[10]
(Australia) S Huss (South Africa) W Moodie	6	5	[4]
(Australia) W Arthurs (United Kingdom) J Auckland	4	4
2	(Austria) J Knowle (Austria) J Melzer	6	6

Final
1	(Sweden) S Aspelin (Australia) T Perry	6	7^{7}
2	(Austria) J Knowle (Austria) J Melzer	1	6^{3}
