= 2007 St. Petersburg Open =

- Date: 22–28 October
- Edition: 13th
- Category: International Series
- Draw: 32Q / 32S / 16D
- Prize money: $975,000
- Surface: Carpet / indoor
- Location: St. Petersburg, Russia
- Venue: Petersburg Sports and Concert Complex

Champions

Singles
- (United Kingdom) Andy Murray

Doubles
- (Canada) Daniel Nestor / (Serbia) Nenad Zimonjić
← 2006 ·	St. Petersburg Open	· 2008 →

The 2007 St. Petersburg Open was a tennis tournament played on indoor carpet courts. It was the 13th edition of the St. Petersburg Open, and was part of the International Series of the 2007 ATP Tour. It took place at the Petersburg Sports and Concert Complex in Saint Petersburg, Russia, from October 22 through October 28, 2007.

The singles field was led by ATP No. 4, French Open and US Open semifinalist, and recent Moscow winner Nikolay Davydenko, Doha and Metz runner-up, San Jose champion Andy Murray, and Dubai and Munich finalist, Rotterdam titlist Mikhail Youzhny. Other seeded players were Valencia and Kitzbühel runner-up Potito Starace, Indianapolis and Bangkok champion Dmitry Tursunov, Fernando Verdasco, Philipp Kohlschreiber and Thomas Johansson.

== Davydenko controversy ==
World No. 4, top seed and home favourite Nikolay Davydenko received a warning and a $2,000 fine for not trying hard enough during his second-round encounter against then-102nd-ranked Croatian Marin Čilić. After cruising through the first set 6–1, Davydenko lost a tight second 5–7, and eventually the third 1–6, committing ten double faults over the course of the match. Belgian chair umpire Jean-Philippe Dercq decided in the third set to issue Davydenko a code violation for lack of best effort.

The accusation came as the Russian was under investigation from the Association of Tennis Professionals (ATP) after irregular betting patterns were found in his match against Martín Vassallo Argüello at the Sopot event earlier in the year. Davydenko called the umpire's decision "outrageous", and cited leg pain to explain his loss: "The reality is that I started feeling tired. My legs were just dead by the third set. Maybe my problems are psychological, maybe it's in my head." His opponent, Čilić, backed up Davydenko, saying he did not believe the Russian had stopped trying to win the match.

Davydenko appealed, and on November 13, after reviewing and analysing the match, the ATP decided to remove the sanction and rescind the fine, consequently closing the case.

== Finals ==
=== Singles ===
(United Kingdom) Andy Murray defeated (Spain) Fernando Verdasco, 6–2, 6–3

- It was Andy Murray's 2nd title of the year, and his 3rd overall.

=== Doubles ===
(Canada) Daniel Nestor / (Serbia) Nenad Zimonjić defeated (Austria) Jürgen Melzer / (Australia) Todd Perry, 6–1, 7–6^{(7–3)}
