= 2006 St. Petersburg Open =

- Date: 23–29 October
- Edition: 12th
- Category: International Series
- Draw: 32Q / 32S / 16D
- Prize money: $975,000
- Surface: Carpet / indoor
- Location: St. Petersburg, Russia
- Venue: Petersburg Sports and Concert Complex

Champions

Singles
- (Croatia) Mario Ančić

Doubles
- (Sweden) Simon Aspelin / (Australia) Todd Perry
← 2005 ·	St. Petersburg Open	· 2007 →

The 2006 St. Petersburg Open was a tennis tournament played on indoor hard courts. It was the 12th edition of the St. Petersburg Open, and was part of the International Series of the 2006 ATP Tour. It took place at the Petersburg Sports and Concert Complex in Saint Petersburg, Russia, from October 23 through October 29, 2006.

The singles draw was headlined by ATP No. 6 Nikolay Davydenko, No. 8 Tommy Robredo, and No. 12 Mario Ančić.

== Finals ==
=== Singles ===
(Croatia) Mario Ančić defeated (Sweden) Thomas Johansson 7–5, 7–6^{(7–2)}

- It was Mario Ančić's 2nd title of the year, and his 3rd and final title overall. It was his 1st win at the event.

=== Doubles ===
(Sweden) Simon Aspelin / (Australia) Todd Perry defeated (Austria) Julian Knowle / (Austria) Jürgen Melzer 6–1, 7–6^{(7–3)}
