= 2007 St. Petersburg Open – Singles =

Singles
- 2007 St. Petersburg Open

Final
- Champion: (United Kingdom) Andy Murray
- Runner-up: (Spain) Fernando Verdasco
- Score: 6–2, 6–3

Events
| Singles | Doubles |
| ← 2006 · | St. Petersburg Open | · 2008 → |

Mario Ančić was the defending champion, but lost in the second round to Mikhail Youzhny.

Andy Murray won in the final 6–2, 6–3, against Fernando Verdasco.

== Seeds ==
1. (Russia) Nikolay Davydenko (second round)
2. (United Kingdom) Andy Murray (champion)
3. (Russia) Mikhail Youzhny (semifinals)
4. (Italy) Potito Starace (quarterfinals)
5. (Russia) Dmitry Tursunov (quarterfinals)
6. (Spain) Fernando Verdasco (final)
7. (Germany) Philipp Kohlschreiber (quarterfinals, retired due to an illness)
8. (Sweden) Thomas Johansson (first round)

== Draw ==
=== Key ===
- Q = Qualifier
- WC = Wild card
- LL = Lucky loser
- Alt = Alternate
- SE = Special exempt
- PR = Protected ranking
- ITF = ITF entry
- JE = Junior exempt
- w/o = Walkover
- r = Retired
- d = Defaulted
- SR = Special ranking

=== Finals ===
Semifinals
Q | (Croatia) Marin Čilić | 2 | 3
6 | (Spain) Fernando Verdasco | 6 | 6
3 | (Russia) Mikhail Youzhny | 2 | 7 | 6^{1}
2 | (United Kingdom) Andy Murray | 6 | 5 | 7^{7}

Final
6 | (Spain) Fernando Verdasco | 2 | 3
2 | (United Kingdom) Andy Murray | 6 | 6

=== Top half ===
First round
1 | (Russia) N Davydenko | 6 | 6
(Italy) F Volandri | 1 | 1
WC | (Russia) M Elgin | 3 | 4
Q | (Croatia) M Čilić | 6 | 6
(Chile) N Massú | 3 | 6 | 6
(Russia) T Gabashvili | 6 | 3 | 4
(Latvia) E Gulbis | 6 | 6
8 | (Sweden) T Johansson | 2 | 1
4 | (Italy) P Starace | 3 | 6 | 7^{7}
(Belgium) K Vliegen | 6 | 4 | 6^{3}
Q | (Russia) M Ledovskikh | 7 | 6
Q | (Russia) M Kukushkin | 5 | 3
(Italy) S Bolelli | 7^{10} | 6
(Sweden) J Björkman | 6^{8} | 2
(Austria) W Eschauer | 6^{4} | 1
6 | (Spain) F Verdasco | 7^{7} | 6

Second round
1 | (Russia) N Davydenko | 6 | 5 | 1
Q | (Croatia) M Čilić | 1 | 7 | 6
(Chile) N Massú | 1 | 2
(Latvia) E Gulbis | 6 | 6
4 | (Italy) P Starace | 7^{7} | 6
Q | (Russia) M Ledovskikh | 6^{4} | 2
(Italy) S Bolelli | 4 | 4
6 | (Spain) F Verdasco | 6 | 6

Quarterfinals
Q | (Croatia) M Čilić | 6 | 6
(Latvia) E Gulbis | 4 | 4
4 | (Italy) P Starace | 3 | 4
6 | (Spain) F Verdasco | 6 | 6

Semifinals
Q | (Croatia) M Čilić | 2 | 3
6 | (Spain) F Verdasco | 6 | 6

=== Bottom half ===
First round
7 | (Germany) P Kohlschreiber | 7^{7} | 6
(Russia) E Korolev | 6^{4} | 3
(Russia) I Kunitsyn | 6^{2} | 3
WC | (Russia) D Matsukevich | 7^{7} | 6
(Croatia) M Ančić | 6 | 6
(Ecuador) N Lapentti | 4 | 1
(United States) J Gimelstob | 2 | 4
3 | (Russia) M Youzhny | 6 | 6
5 | (Russia) D Tursunov | 7^{8} | 7^{7}
(Austria) J Melzer | 6^{6} | 6^{0}
(Serbia) B Pašanski | 7^{8} | 6
(Spain) G García López | 6^{6} | 4
WC | (Russia) P Chekhov | 6^{5} | 4
Q | (Czech Republic) L Dlouhý | 7^{7} | 6
(Belarus) M Mirnyi | 2 | 2
2 | (United Kingdom) A Murray | 6 | 6

Second round
7 | (Germany) P Kohlschreiber | 6 | 6
WC | (Russia) D Matsukevich | 1 | 1
(Croatia) M Ančić | 4 | 2
3 | (Russia) M Youzhny | 6 | 6
5 | (Russia) D Tursunov | 4 | 6 | 6
(Serbia) B Pašanski | 6 | 3 | 4
Q | (Czech Republic) L Dlouhý | 2 | 4
2 | (United Kingdom) A Murray | 6 | 6

Quarterfinals
7 | (Germany) P Kohlschreiber | 4 | 0^{r}
3 | (Russia) M Youzhny | 6 | 0
5 | (Russia) D Tursunov | 6 | 6^{2} | 4
2 | (United Kingdom) A Murray | 3 | 7^{7} | 6

Semifinals
3 | (Russia) M Youzhny | 2 | 7 | 6^{1}
2 | (United Kingdom) A Murray | 6 | 5 | 7^{7}
