= 2006 St. Petersburg Open – Singles =

Singles
- 2006 St. Petersburg Open

Final
- Champion: (Croatia) Mario Ančić
- Runner-up: (Sweden) Thomas Johansson
- Score: 7–5, 7–6^{(7–2)}

Events
Singles	Doubles
← 2005 ·	St. Petersburg Open	· 2007 →

Thomas Johansson was the defending champion.

Mario Ančić won the title, beating Johansson 7–5, 7–6^{(7–2)} in the final.

== Seeds ==
1. (Russia) Nikolay Davydenko (second round, retired because of a foot injury)
2. (Spain) Tommy Robredo (first round)
3. (Croatia) Mario Ančić (champion)
4. (Germany) Tommy Haas (second round)
5. (Finland) Jarkko Nieminen (second round, retired because of a left foot injury)
6. (Russia) Dmitry Tursunov (first round)
7. (Russia) Mikhail Youzhny (second round, withdrew because of an ankle injury)
8. (Austria) Jürgen Melzer (first round)

== Draw ==
=== Key ===
- Q = Qualifier
- WC = Wild card
- LL = Lucky loser
- Alt = Alternate
- SE = Special exempt
- PR = Protected ranking
- ITF = ITF entry
- JE = Junior exempt
- w/o = Walkover
- r = Retired
- d = Defaulted
- SR = Special ranking

=== Finals ===
Semifinals
(Sweden) Thomas Johansson	6	7^{7}
WC	(Russia) Igor Kunitsyn	3	6^{3}
3	(Croatia) Mario Ančić	6	6
WC	(Latvia) Ernests Gulbis	2	3

Final
(Sweden) Thomas Johansson	5	6^{2}
3	(Croatia) M Ančić	7	7^{7}

=== Top half ===
First round
1	(Russia) N Davydenko	6	6
(France) F Santoro	3	1
(South Africa) W Moodie	2	7	6
WC	(Russia) T Gabashvili	6	5	3
(Sweden) T Johansson	6	6^{3}	6
(Canada) F Dancevic	0	7^{7}	3
(Germany) R Schüttler	6^{6}	4
7	(Russia) M Youzhny	7^{8}	6
4	(Germany) T Haas	6	6^{6}	6
Q	(Serbia) N Zimonjić	2	7^{8}	2
(Germany) B Phau	6^{6}	3
WC	(Russia) I Kunitsyn	7^{8}	6
(Italy) D Bracciali	3	3
(Italy) P Starace	6	6
(Serbia) J Tipsarević	5	2
5	(Finland) J Nieminen	7	6

Second round
1	(Russia) N Davydenko	6	3^{r}
(South Africa) W Moodie	2	3
(Sweden) T Johansson	w/o
7	(Russia) M Youzhny
4	(Germany) T Haas	6^{4}	6	2
WC	(Russia) I Kunitsyn	7^{7}	4	6
(Italy) P Starace	7	3
5	(Finland) J Nieminen	5	2^{r}

Quarterfinals
(South Africa) W Moodie	3	6	3
(Sweden) T Johansson	6	3	6
WC	(Russia) I Kunitsyn	6	6
(Italy) P Starace	3	2

Semifinals
(Sweden) T Johansson	6	7^{7}
WC	(Russia) I Kunitsyn	3	6^{3}

=== Bottom half ===
First round
6	(Russia) D Tursunov	6	3	4
(Belarus) M Mirnyi	4	6	6
Q	(Croatia) M Čilić	4	5
(Romania) A Pavel	6	7
Q	(Poland) Ł Kubot	4	6	3
(Netherlands) R Sluiter	6	3	6
(United States) P Goldstein	5	1
3	(Croatia) M Ančić	7	6
8	(Austria) J Melzer	6	4	3
(Czech Republic) L Dlouhý	3	6	6
(Czech Republic) R Vik	4	6	6^{4}
WC	(Latvia) E Gulbis	6	3	7^{7}
(Czech Republic) J Hernych	6^{5}	6	7^{9}
(Russia) E Korolev	7^{7}	4	6^{7}
Q	(Australia) W Arthurs	6	2	6
2	(Spain) T Robredo	3	6	4

Second round
(Belarus) M Mirnyi	6	7
(Romania) A Pavel	3	5
(Netherlands) R Sluiter	3	4
3	(Croatia) M Ančić	6	6
(Czech Republic) L Dlouhý	7	3	3
WC	(Latvia) E Gulbis	5	6	6
(Czech Republic) J Hernych	6	6
Q	(Australia) W Arthurs	4	4

Quarterfinals
(Belarus) M Mirnyi	4	5
3	(Croatia) M Ančić	6	7
WC	(Latvia) E Gulbis	7^{8}	6^{4}	6
(Czech Republic) J Hernych	6^{6}	7^{7}	2

Semifinals
3	(Croatia) M Ančić	6	6
WC	(Latvia) E Gulbis	2	3
