= 2005 St. Petersburg Open =

- Date: 24–30 October
- Edition: 11th
- Category: International Series
- Draw: 32S / 16D
- Prize money: $975,000
- Surface: Hard / indoor
- Location: St. Petersburg, Russia
- Venue: Petersburg Sports and Concert Complex

Champions

Singles
- (Sweden) Thomas Johansson

Doubles
- (Austria) Julian Knowle / (Austria) Jürgen Melzer
← 2004 ·	St. Petersburg Open	· 2006 →

The 2005 St. Petersburg Open was a tennis tournament played on indoor hard courts. It was the 11th edition of the St. Petersburg Open, and was part of the International Series of the 2005 ATP Tour. It took place at the Petersburg Sports and Concert Complex in Saint Petersburg, Russia, from October 24 through October 30, 2005.

The singles draw was headlined by ATP No. 8, Australian Open quarterfinalist, French Open semifinalist, St. Pölten winner Nikolay Davydenko, Wimbledon semifinalist, 1997 St. Petersburg champion Thomas Johansson, and Memphis and Nottingham titlist Max Mirnyi. Also competing were Cincinnati Masters quarterfinalist Mikhail Youzhny, Moscow runner-up Nicolas Kiefer, Jarkko Nieminen, Greg Rusedski and Fernando Verdasco.

== Finals ==
=== Singles ===
(Sweden) Thomas Johansson defeated (Germany) Nicolas Kiefer, 6–4, 6–2

- It was Thomas Johansson's 1st title of the year, and his 9th overall. It was his 2nd win at the event.

=== Doubles ===
(Austria) Julian Knowle / (Austria) Jürgen Melzer defeated (Sweden) Jonas Björkman / (Belarus) Max Mirnyi, 4–6, 7–5, 7–5
