= 2005 St. Petersburg Open – Singles =

Singles
- 2005 St. Petersburg Open

Final
- Champion: (Sweden) Thomas Johansson
- Runner-up: (Germany) Nicolas Kiefer
- Score: 6–4, 6–2

Events
Singles	Doubles
← 2004 ·	St. Petersburg Open	· 2006 →

Mikhail Youzhny was the defending champion, but lost in the quarterfinals this year.

Thomas Johansson won the title, beating Nicolas Kiefer 6–4, 6–2 in the final.

== Seeds ==
1. (Russia) Nikolay Davydenko (quarterfinals)
2. (Sweden) Thomas Johansson (champion)
3. (Belarus) Max Mirnyi (first round)
4. (Russia) Mikhail Youzhny (quarterfinals)
5. (Germany) Nicolas Kiefer (final)
6. (Finland) Jarkko Nieminen (first round)
7. (United Kingdom) Greg Rusedski (quarterfinals)
8. (Spain) Fernando Verdasco (semifinals)

== Draw ==
=== Key ===
- Q = Qualifier
- WC = Wild card
- LL = Lucky loser
- Alt = Alternate
- SE = Special exempt
- PR = Protected ranking
- ITF = ITF entry
- JE = Junior exempt
- w/o = Walkover
- r = Retired
- d = Defaulted
- SR = Special ranking

=== Finals ===
Semifinals
5	(Germany) Nicolas Kiefer	6	6
(Czech Republic) Robin Vik	3	4
8	(Spain) Fernando Verdasco	3	6	3
2	(Sweden) Thomas Johansson	6	3	6

Final
5	(Germany) Nicolas Kiefer	4	2
2	(Sweden) Thomas Johansson	6	6

=== Top half ===
First round
1	(Russia) N Davydenko	6	6
(Czech Republic) L Dlouhý	2	1
(United States) P Goldstein	7^{8}	2	6
(Germany) L Burgsmüller	6^{6}	6	3
WC	(Russia) V Davletshin	3	4
(Austria) J Melzer	6	6
(Spain) G García-López	3	6	4
5	(Germany) N Kiefer	6	3	6
4	(Russia) M Youzhny	6	4
(Slovakia) K Beck	3	1^{r}
WC	(Russia) I Kunitsyn	3	2
(France) C Saulnier	6	6
(France) F Serra	6^{2}	6	6
Q	(Sweden) J Björkman	7^{7}	3	4
(Czech Republic) R Vik	6	6
6	(Finland) J Nieminen	4	4

Second round
1	(Russia) N Davydenko	6	6
(United States) P Goldstein	3	4
(Austria) J Melzer	6	3	5
5	(Germany) N Kiefer	3	6	7
4	(Russia) M Youzhny	6	6
(France) C Saulnier	1	1
(France) F Serra	6^{3}	6	3
(Czech Republic) R Vik	7^{7}	2	6

Quarterfinals
1	(Russia) N Davydenko	1	1
5	(Germany) N Kiefer	6	6
4	(Russia) M Youzhny	6	4	2
(Czech Republic) R Vik	1	6	6

Semifinals
5	(Germany) N Kiefer	6	6
(Czech Republic) R Vik	3	4

=== Bottom half ===
First round
8	(Spain) F Verdasco	7^{7}	4	6
WC	(Australia) M Philippoussis	6^{4}	6	2
Q	(Russia) T Gabashvili	3	3
(Argentina) J Mónaco	6	6
(Germany) A Popp	3	6	4
Q	(Ukraine) S Stakhovsky	6	4	6
(Denmark) K Carlsen	6^{4}	7^{7}	6
3	(Belarus) M Mirnyi	7^{7}	6^{5}	4
7	(United Kingdom) G Rusedski	6	6
(Russia) D Tursunov	4	4
(Czech Republic) I Minář	1	6	5
(United States) K Kim	6	4	7
Q	(Czech Republic) J Vaněk	3	6^{5}
(Romania) A Pavel	6	7^{7}
(Germany) P Kohlschreiber	3	4
2	(Sweden) T Johansson	6	6

Second round
8	(Spain) F Verdasco	7	6
(Argentina) J Mónaco	5	3
Q	(Ukraine) S Stakhovsky	7^{7}	6^{2}	6^{6}
(Denmark) K Carlsen	6^{5}	7^{7}	7^{8}
7	(United Kingdom) G Rusedski	4	6	6
(United States) K Kim	6	3	4
(Romania) A Pavel	2	2
2	(Sweden) T Johansson	6	6

Quarterfinals
8	(Spain) F Verdasco	6	6
(Denmark) K Carlsen	4	2
7	(United Kingdom) G Rusedski	2	6^{6}
2	(Sweden) T Johansson	6	7^{8}

Semifinals
8	(Spain) F Verdasco	3	6	3
2	(Sweden) T Johansson	6	3	6
