= 2006 U.S. Men's Clay Court Championships – Singles =

Singles
- 2006 U.S. Men's Clay Court Championships

Final
- Champion: (United States) Mardy Fish
- Runner-up: (Austria) Jürgen Melzer
- Score: 3–6, 6–4, 6–3

Details
- Draw: 32
- Seeds: 8

Events
Singles	Doubles
- U.S. Men's Clay Court Championships

The 2006 U.S. Men's Clay Court Championships – Singles was an event of the 2006 U.S. Men's Clay Court Championships professional tennis tournament played on outdoor clay courts in Houston, Texas in the United States and was part of the International Series of the 2006 ATP Tour. The tournament was held from April 10 through April 17, 2006. The singles draw comprised 32 players and eight of them were seeded. Unseeded Mardy Fish won the singles title after a 3–6, 6–4, 6–3 win in the final against unseeded Jürgen Melzer.

== Seeds ==
A champion seed is indicated in bold text while text in italics indicates the round in which that seed was eliminated.

1. (United States) Andy Roddick (quarterfinals)
2. (United States) James Blake (first round)
3. (United States) Robby Ginepri (first round)
4. (Cyprus) Marcos Baghdatis (second round, retired because of a back injury)
5. (Germany) Tommy Haas (semifinals, retired because of a wrist injury)
6. (Peru) Luis Horna (first round)
7. (United States) Paul Goldstein (semifinals)
8. (Argentina) Juan Mónaco (first round)

== Draw ==
Key

- Q = Qualifier
- WC = Wild card
- LL = Lucky loser
- Alt = Alternate
- ITF = ITF entry
- PR = Protected ranking
- SR = Special ranking
- SE = Special exempt
- JE = Junior exempt
- JR = Junior Accelerator Programme entrant
- CO = College Accelerator Programme entrant
- NG = Next Gen Accelerator Program entrant
- w/o = Walkover
- r = Retired
- d = Defaulted

First round
1	(United States) **A Roddick**	**6**	**6**
(Chile) P Capdeville	3	2
(Austria) **O Marach**	**6**	**6**
(Costa Rica) J A Marín	4	1
(Germany) **A Waske**	**6**	2	6^{2}
(Czech Republic) J Vaněk	4	**6**	**7^{7}**
(Spain) Ó Hernández	1	4
5	(Germany) **T Haas**	**6**	**6**
WC/4	(Cyprus) **M Baghdatis**	**6**	**7^{7}**
WC	(United States) J Witten	4	6^{2}
(United States) **V Spadea**	**6**	**6**
(Argentina) C Berlocq	1	3
(Germany) **R Schüttler**	**6**	**6**
Q	(Luxembourg) G Müller	0	3
WC	(United States) **M Fish**	**6**	1	**7^{7}**
8	(Argentina) J Mónaco	2	**6**	6^{5}
7	(United States) **P Goldstein**	**6**	**6**
(Serbia and Montenegro) J Tipsarević	3	3
Q	(Russia) I Kunitsyn	5	**6**	3
Q	(United States) **S Jenkins**	**7**	2	**6**
(Romania) R Sabău	5	**7**	5
(Germany) **T Behrend**	**7**	5	**7**
(Spain) **Montañés**	**6**	**6**
3	(United States) R Ginepri	4	4
6	(Peru) L Horna	3	4
(Brazil) **M Daniel**	**6**	**6**
(Austria) **J Melzer**	**7^{9}**	**6**
(Czech Republic) I Minář	6^{7}	0
(United States) B Reynolds	2	1
(Spain) **F Vicente**	**6**	**6**
Q	(France) **A Dupuis**	**7^{7}**	3	**6**
2	(United States) J Blake	6^{2}	**6**	1

Second round
1	(United States) **A Roddick**	**6**	**6**
(Austria) O Marach	3	4
(Germany) A Waske	1	6^{7}
5	(Germany) **T Haas**	**6**	**7^{9}**
WC/4	(Cyprus) M Baghdatis	2	1^{r}
(United States) **V Spadea**	**6**	3
(Germany) R Schüttler
WC	(United States) **M Fish**	w/o
7	(United States) **P Goldstein**	**6**	**6**
Q	(United States) S Jenkins	4	1
(Germany) T Behrend	2	3
(Spain) **Montañés**	**6**	**6**
(Brazil) M Daniel	6^{2}	4
(Austria) **J Melzer**	**7^{7}**	**6**
(Spain) **F Vicente**	**6**	**7**
Q	(France) A Dupuis	2	5

Quarterfinals
1	(United States) A Roddick	**7^{7}**	4	4
5	(Germany) **T Haas**	6^{1}	**6**	**6**
(United States) V Spadea	**6**	6^{1}	2
WC	(United States) **M Fish**	4	**7^{7}**	**6**
7	(United States) **P Goldstein**	**6**	**6**
(Spain) Montañés	3	4
(Austria) **J Melzer**	**7**	**6**
(Spain) F Vicente	5	4

Semifinals
5	(Germany) T Haas	1^{r}
WC	(United States) **M Fish**	4
7	(United States) P Goldstein	3	4
(Austria) **J Melzer**	**6**	**6**

Final
WC	(United States) **Mardy Fish**	3	**6**	**6**
(Austria) J Melzer	**6**	3	4
