= 2006 U.S. Men's Clay Court Championships =

- Date: April 10–17
- Edition: 38th
- Category: International Series
- Draw: 32S / 16D
- Prize money: $355,000
- Surface: Clay / outdoor
- Location: Houston, Texas, US

Champions

Singles
- (United States) Mardy Fish

Doubles
- (Germany) Michael Kohlmann / (Germany) Alexander Waske
- U.S. Men's Clay Court Championships

The 2006 U.S. Men's Clay Court Championships was an Association of Tennis Professionals men's tennis tournament held in Houston, Texas in the United States. The event was played on outdoor clay courts and was part of the International Series of the 2006 ATP Tour. It was the 38th edition of the tournament and was held from April 10 to April 17, 2006. Unseeded Mardy Fish, who entered on a wildcard, won the singles title.

== Finals ==
=== Singles ===
(United States) Mardy Fish defeated (Austria) Jürgen Melzer 3–6, 6–4, 6–3

- It was Fish's only title of the year and the 5th of his career.

=== Doubles ===
(Germany) Michael Kohlmann / (Germany) Alexander Waske defeated (Austria) Julian Knowle / (Austria) Jürgen Melzer 5–7, 6–4, [10–5]

- It was Kohlmann's only title of the year and the 4th of his career. It was Waske's 1st title of the year and the 1st of his career.
