= 2005 St. Petersburg Open – Doubles =

Doubles
- 2005 St. Petersburg Open

Final
- Champions: (Austria) Julian Knowle (Austria) Jürgen Melzer
- Runners-up: (Sweden) Jonas Björkman (Belarus) Max Mirnyi
- Score: 4–6, 7–5, 7–5

Events
Singles	Doubles
- St. Petersburg Open

Arnaud Clément and Michaël Llodra were the defending champions, but did not participate this year.

Julian Knowle and Jürgen Melzer won the title, defeating Jonas Björkman and Max Mirnyi 4–6, 7–5, 7–5 in the final.

== Seeds ==
1. (Sweden) Jonas Björkman / (Belarus) Max Mirnyi (final)
2. (Australia) Wayne Arthurs / (Australia) Paul Hanley (semifinals)
3. (India) Mahesh Bhupathi / (Czech Republic) Martin Damm (first round)
4. (Sweden) Simon Aspelin / (Australia) Todd Perry (quarterfinals)

== Draw ==
Key

- Q = Qualifier
- WC = Wild card
- LL = Lucky loser
- Alt = Alternate
- ITF = ITF entry
- PR = Protected ranking
- SR = Special ranking
- SE = Special exempt
- JE = Junior exempt
- JR = Junior Accelerator Programme entrant
- CO = College Accelerator Programme entrant
- NG = Next Gen Accelerator Program entrant
- w/o = Walkover
- r = Retired
- d = Defaulted

=== Draw ===
First round
1	(Sweden) J Björkman (Belarus) M Mirnyi	6	6
(Czech Republic) L Dlouhý (Czech Republic) R Vik	1	2
WC	(Russia) V Davletshin (Russia) I Kunitsyn	6	6
(United States) K Kim (Argentina) J Mónaco	0	4
4	(Sweden) S Aspelin (Australia) T Perry	6	6
(Slovakia) K Beck (Czech Republic) P Pála	2	4
(United States) P Goldstein (United States) J Thomas	2	4
(Sweden) T Johansson (South Africa) R Koenig	6	6
(Czech Republic) L Friedl (Russia) M Youzhny	7^{7}	6
(Czech Republic) I Minář (Czech Republic) J Vaněk	6^{2}	4
(Austria) J Knowle (Austria) J Melzer	3	6	7^{8}
3	(India) M Bhupathi (Czech Republic) M Damm	6	3	6^{6}
(Poland) M Fyrstenberg (Poland) M Matkowski	6	6
WC	(Russia) T Gabashvili (Russia) K Ivanov-Smolensky	3	2
(Finland) J Nieminen (Russia) D Tursunov	1	6^{7}
2	(Australia) W Arthurs (Australia) P Hanley	6	7^{9}

Quarterfinals
1	(Sweden) J Björkman (Belarus) M Mirnyi	6	6
WC	(Russia) V Davletshin (Russia) I Kunitsyn	0	2
4	(Sweden) S Aspelin (Australia) T Perry	7	3	6^{4}
(Sweden) T Johansson (South Africa) R Koenig	5	6	7^{7}
(Czech Republic) L Friedl (Russia) M Youzhny
(Austria) J Knowle (Austria) J Melzer	w/o
(Poland) M Fyrstenberg (Poland) M Matkowski	6	3	6^{0}
2	(Australia) W Arthurs (Australia) P Hanley	4	6	7^{7}

Semifinals
1	(Sweden) J Björkman (Belarus) M Mirnyi	6^{2}	6	6
(Sweden) T Johansson (South Africa) R Koenig	7^{7}	3	4
(Austria) J Knowle (Austria) J Melzer	6	6
2	(Australia) W Arthurs (Australia) P Hanley	4	4

Final
1	(Sweden) J Björkman (Belarus) M Mirnyi	6	5	5
(Austria) J Knowle (Austria) J Melzer	4	7	7
