= 2007 St. Petersburg Open – Doubles =

Doubles
- 2007 St. Petersburg Open

Final
- Champions: (Canada) Daniel Nestor (Serbia) Nenad Zimonjić
- Runners-up: (Austria) Jürgen Melzer (Australia) Todd Perry
- Score: 6–1, 7–6^{(7–3)}

Events
| Singles | Doubles |
| ← 2006 · | St. Petersburg Open | · 2008 → |

Simon Aspelin and Todd Perry were the defending champions, but Aspelin chose not to participate, and only Perry competed that year.
Perry partnered with Jürgen Melzer, but Daniel Nestor and Nenad Zimonjić defeated them 6–1, 7–6^{(7–3)}, in the final.

== Seeds ==
1. (Canada) Daniel Nestor / (Serbia) Nenad Zimonjić (champions)
2. (Sweden) Jonas Björkman / (Belarus) Max Mirnyi (quarterfinals)
3. (Czech Republic) Lukáš Dlouhý / (Czech Republic) Pavel Vízner (semifinals)
4. (Austria) Jürgen Melzer / (Australia) Todd Perry (final)

== Draw ==
=== Key ===
- Q = Qualifier
- WC = Wild card
- LL = Lucky loser
- Alt = Alternate
- SE = Special exempt
- PR = Protected ranking
- ITF = ITF entry
- JE = Junior exempt
- w/o = Walkover
- r = Retired
- d = Defaulted
- SR = Special ranking

=== Draw ===
First round
1 | (Canada) D Nestor (Serbia) N Zimonjić | 6 | 6
(Russia) T Gabashvili (Russia) E Korolev | 3 | 3
(Ecuador) N Lapentti (Chile) N Massú | 7 | 3 | [6]
(Ukraine) S Bubka (Czech Republic) J Hernych | 5 | 6 | [10]
3 | (Czech Republic) L Dlouhý (Czech Republic) P Vízner | 6 | 6
(United Kingdom) J Auckland (United Kingdom) R Hutchins | 3 | 2
(Italy) P Starace (Italy) F Volandri | 1 | 7^{7} | [10]
(Austria) W Eschauer (Germany) P Kohlschreiber | 6 | 6^{4} | [4]
WC | (Russia) M Elgin (Russia) A Kudryavtsev | 6 | 6
(Italy) S Bolelli (Serbia) B Pašanski | 4 | 2
WC | (Russia) A Chernov (Russia) V Rudnev | 4 | 2
4 | (Austria) J Melzer (Australia) T Perry | 6 | 6
(Czech Republic) F Čermák (Russia) M Youzhny | 6 | 6
(Ukraine) S Stakhovsky (Ukraine) O Tereschuk | 4 | 3
(United States) J Gimelstob (Russia) I Kunitysn | 1 | 2
2 | (Sweden) J Björkman (Belarus) M Mirnyi | 6 | 6

Quarterfinals
1 | (Canada) D Nestor (Serbia) N Zimonjić | 7 | 6
(Ukraine) S Bubka (Czech Republic) J Hernych | 5 | 4
3 | (Czech Republic) L Dlouhý (Czech Republic) P Vízner | 6 | 6
(Italy) P Starace (Italy) F Volandri | 3 | 1
(Russia) M Elgin (Russia) A Kudryavtsev | 1 | 6 | [4]
4 | (Austria) J Melzer (Australia) T Perry | 6 | 3 | [10]
(Czech Republic) F Čermák (Russia) M Youzhny | 0 | 6 | [10]
2 | (Sweden) J Björkman (Belarus) M Mirnyi | 6 | 4 | [8]

Semifinals
1 | (Canada) D Nestor (Serbia) N Zimonjić | 6 | 6
3 | (Czech Republic) L Dlouhý (Czech Republic) P Vízner | 1 | 4
4 | (Austria) J Melzer (Australia) T Perry | 7 | 7^{7}
(Czech Republic) F Čermák (Russia) M Youzhny | 5 | 6^{2}

Final
1 | (Canada) D Nestor (Serbia) N Zimonjić | 6 | 7^{7}
4 | (Austria) J Melzer (Australia) T Perry | 1 | 6^{3}
