= 2006 U.S. Men's Clay Court Championships – Doubles =

Doubles
- 2006 U.S. Men's Clay Court Championships

Final
- Champions: (Germany) Michael Kohlmann (Germany) Alexander Waske
- Runners-up: (Austria) Julian Knowle (Austria) Jürgen Melzer
- Score: 5–7, 6–4, [10–5]

Details
- Draw: 16
- Seeds: 4

Events
| Singles | Doubles |
- U.S. Men's Clay Court Championships

Mark Knowles and Daniel Nestor were the defending champions, but lost in the first round this year.

Michael Kohlmann and Alexander Waske won in the final 5–7, 6–4, [10–5], against Julian Knowle and Jürgen Melzer.

== Seeds ==
1. (United States) Bob Bryan / (United States) Mike Bryan (quarterfinals)
2. (The Bahamas) Mark Knowles / (Canada) Daniel Nestor (first round)
3. (Austria) Julian Knowle / (Austria) Jürgen Melzer (final)
4. (Australia) Ashley Fisher / (Australia) Stephen Huss (semifinal)

== Draw ==
Key

- Q = Qualifier
- WC = Wild card
- LL = Lucky loser
- Alt = Alternate
- ITF = ITF entry
- PR = Protected ranking
- SR = Special ranking
- SE = Special exempt
- JE = Junior exempt
- JR = Junior Accelerator Programme entrant
- CO = College Accelerator Programme entrant
- NG = Next Gen Accelerator Program entrant
- w/o = Walkover
- r = Retired
- d = Defaulted

=== Draw ===
First round
1 | (United States) B Bryan (United States) M Bryan | 6 | 6
WC | (United States) T Blake (United States) P Goldstein | 3 | 4
(Germany) M Kohlmann (Germany) A Waske | 6 | 6
(United States) V Spadea (Serbia and Montenegro) J Tipsarević | 3 | 0
4 | (Australia) A Fisher (Australia) S Huss | 6 | 2 | [10]
(Costa Rica) JA Marín (Spain) A Montañés | 1 | 6 | [8]
(Argentina) C Berlocq (Chile) P Capdeville | 3 | 6 | [2]
(United States) R Ginepri (Germany) R Schüttler | 6 | 4 | [10]
(Austria) O Marach (Luxembourg) G Müller | 3 | 6^{8}
(United States) T Phillips (United States) B Reynolds | 6 | 7^{10}
(Sweden) R Lindstedt (United States) T Parrott | 5 | 6 | [6]
3 | (Austria) J Knowle (Austria) J Melzer | 7 | 0 | [10]
Alt | (Germany) T Behrend (Brazil) M Daniel | 5 | 3
WC | (United States) J Blake (United States) M Fish | 7 | 6
(Czech Republic) T Cibulec (Czech Republic) I Minář | 6 | 2 | [10]
2 | (The Bahamas) M Knowles (Canada) D Nestor | 4 | 6 | [6]

Quarterfinals
1 | (United States) B Bryan (United States) M Bryan | 7 | 6^{4} | [7]
(Germany) M Kohlmann (Germany) A Waske | 5 | 7^{7} | [10]
4 | (Australia) A Fisher (Australia) S Huss | w/o
(United States) R Ginepri (Germany) R Schüttler
(United States) T Phillips (United States) B Reynolds | 7 | 5 | [8]
3 | (Austria) J Knowle (Austria) J Melzer | 5 | 7 | [10]
WC | (United States) J Blake (United States) M Fish | 7 | 6
(Czech Republic) T Cibulec (Czech Republic) I Minář | 5 | 1

Semifinals
(Germany) M Kohlmann (Germany) A Waske | 6 | 6
4 | (Australia) A Fisher (Australia) S Huss | 4 | 3
3 | (Austria) J Knowle (Austria) J Melzer | 6 | 7
WC | (United States) J Blake (United States) M Fish | 4 | 5

Final
(Germany) M Kohlmann (Germany) A Waske | 5 | 6 | [10]
3 | (Austria) J Knowle (Austria) J Melzer | 7 | 4 | [5]
