= Jürgen Melzer =

Austrian tennis player (born 1981)

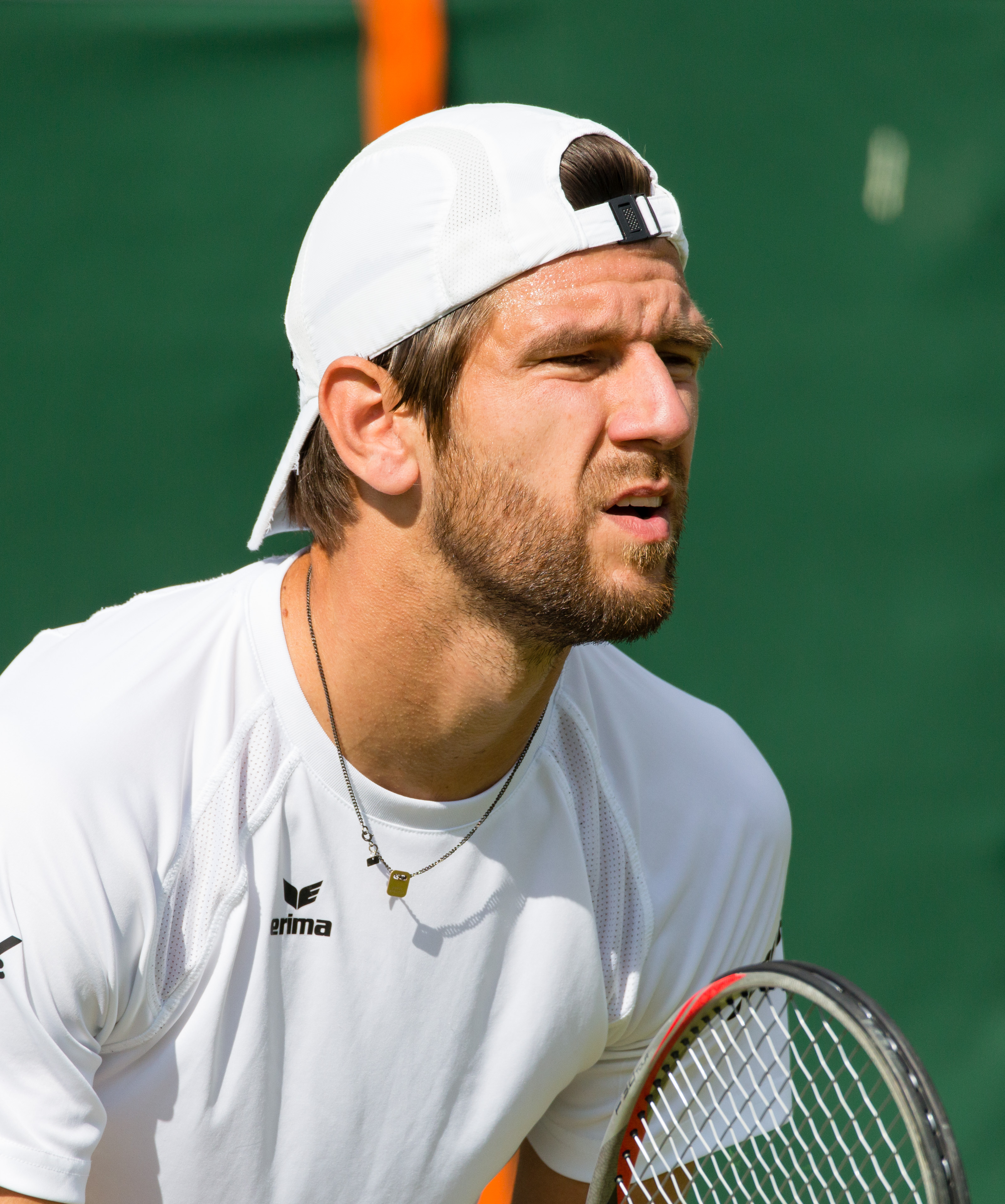
- Melzer at Wimbledon in 2015
- Country (sports): Austria
- Residence: Deutsch-Wagram, Austria
- Born: 22 May 1981 (age 45) Vienna, Austria
- Height: 1.83 m (6 ft 0 in)
- Turned pro: 1999
- Retired: 2021
- Plays: Left-handed (two-handed backhand)
- Prize money: US$10,739,212

Singles
- Career record: 350–334
- Career titles: 5
- Highest ranking: No. 8 (18 April 2011)

Grand Slam singles results
- Australian Open: 4R (2011)
- French Open: SF (2010)
- Wimbledon: 4R (2010, 2013)
- US Open: 4R (2010)

Other tournaments
- Olympic Games: QF (2008)

Doubles
- Career record: 375–297
- Career titles: 17
- Highest ranking: No. 6 (27 November 2010)

Grand Slam doubles results
- Australian Open: SF (2005)
- French Open: QF (2005)
- Wimbledon: W (2010)
- US Open: W (2011)

Other doubles tournaments
- Tour Finals: F (2020)
- Olympic Games: 2R (2008, 2012)

Mixed doubles
- Career titles: 1

Grand Slam mixed doubles results
- Australian Open: QF (2009)
- French Open: 2R (2006)
- Wimbledon: W (2011)
- US Open: 1R (2008, 2011, 2012)

Team competitions
- Davis Cup: QF (2012)

Jürgen Melzer (born 22 May 1981) is an Austrian tennis coach and former professional tennis player. Melzer reached a career-high singles ranking of world No. 8 in April 2011, and a doubles ranking of world No. 6 in September 2010. He has a younger brother, Gerald Melzer, with whom he played doubles in several tournaments.

In 1999, Melzer won the boys' singles title at Wimbledon. For many years, he was known as one of the best players on the tour not to have progressed past the third round of a major. He ended this by reaching the semifinals of the 2010 French Open, losing to Rafael Nadal after coming from two sets down to defeat Novak Djokovic in the quarterfinals. He is one of only two men to defeat Djokovic from two sets down, the other being João Fonseca at the 2026 French Open.

Melzer had greater success in doubles, winning the men's doubles title at the 2010 Wimbledon Championships and the 2011 US Open partnering Philipp Petzschner, as well as the mixed doubles title at the 2011 Wimbledon Championships partnering Iveta Benešová (whom he would later marry and divorce).

== Career ==
=== Personal life ===
Melzer married Iveta Benešová, a WTA Tour tennis player, on 14 September 2012 and divorced in 2015. Melzer is a left-handed tennis player, but is right-handed in everyday life.

=== Junior career ===
Melzer played his first junior match in September 1995 at the age of 14 at a Grade-3 tournament in Austria.

At the 1999 Australian Open, Melzer won the doubles draw partnering singles champion Kristian Pless. Then, at the 1999 Wimbledon Championships, Melzer won the singles draw defeating junior world No. 1 and doubles partner, Kristian Pless, in the final.

Melzer ended his junior career after his Wimbledon victory. Throughout his junior career, he reached as high as world No. 26 in 1998 (and No. 24 in doubles) and posted a win–loss record of 52–26 in singles and 47–23 in doubles.

Grand Slam results – Singles:

Australian Open: 3R (1999)
French Open: 1R (1998)
Wimbledon: W (1999)
US Open: 2R (1998)

Grand Slam results – Doubles:

Australian Open: W (1999)
French Open: 1R (1998)
Wimbledon: QF (1999)
US Open: 1R (1998)

=== Early years ===
In 1998, Melzer started playing in Futures in his country, where he won his first two matches, but lost the next four.

In 1999, he started playing outside of Austria in Futures and Challengers. He competed in his first main-draw match in the 1999 CA-TennisTrophy in Vienna, Austria, where he defeated Lars Burgsmüller, before losing to then world No. 11, Nicolas Kiefer, in two sets.

In 2000, Melzer continued playing in Futures and Challengers, but was only able to reach one quarterfinal. He also made his Grand Slam debut at the Wimbledon Championships, but lost to Australian Mark Philippoussis in four sets.

In 2001, he reach his first Futures final event at Poprad, Slovakia, losing to Juraj Hasko. However, he captured his first title at the Challenger in Mönchengladbach, Germany over local hero Jens Knippschild in three sets. He had his first top-100 and top-20 win over Fabrice Santoro, then world No. 18 in the CA-TennisTrophy, but lost in the next round to Michel Kratochvil in two tiebreaks.

In 2002, he regularly competed in Challenger events, reaching two finals, but losing in both attempts to Alexander Popp in Heilbronn, Germany and to Luis Horna in Fürth, Germany. He reached his first ATP Tour quarterfinal in the Internationaler Raiffeisen Grand Prix, defeating Sargis Sargsian and Andrea Gaudenzi in straight sets, before losing to eventual champion Nicolás Lapentti. However, he did better in the Croatia Open by reaching the semifinals, defeating Vincent Spadea, Agustín Calleri, and Victor Hănescu, before losing to eventual champion Carlos Moyá. He also won his first Grand Slam match at the US Open over Jack Brasington, before losing to Nicolás Massú in four sets. At the Vienna Open, he earned one of the biggest wins of his career by defeating then world No. 2, Tommy Haas, to reach the quarterfinals, before losing to Jiří Novák in two sets.

The start of 2003 was not a good one for the Austrian, as he lost three consecutive Tour-level main-draw matches, including his Australian Open debut. He rebounded in April by reaching the semifinals, losing to then world No. 2 Andre Agassi. He also made his French Open debut, but lost to David Ferrer. At Wimbledon, Melzer upset then world No. 15, Fernando González, to earn his first Wimbledon victory, but lost to Jonas Björkman in four sets the following round. Melzer reached his first ATP Tour final at the Hall of Fame Tennis Championships without defeating a player in the top 100, but lost to Robby Ginepri in the final. In the US Open, Melzer reached the second round again, but lost Juan Carlos Ferrero. He earned another top-20 victory over Tommy Robredo in the Vienna Open.

=== 2004–2006 ===
In 2004, the Austrian reached his first third round of a Grand Slam at the Australian Open with victories over Tomas Behrend, and Galo Blanco, before losing to Sjeng Schalken. Melzer made his Master Series debut at Indian Wells, losing to Victor Hănescu. He then won his first Master Series matches at the Miami Masters with victories over Ivo Karlović, and then world No. 8, Tim Henman, but lost to Todd Martin in straight sets in the third round. He next reached the quarterfinals of the Hamburg Masters with victories over Nicolás Massú, Irakli Labadze, and Marat Safin, but lost to former world No. 1, Lleyton Hewitt. Melzer then reached the semifinals of the Internationaler Raiffeisen Grand Prix, losing to Xavier Malisse in three sets. He then won his first French Open match over Wayne Ferreira, but then lost to Lleyton Hewitt in four sets.

In the Canada Masters, he reached the quarterfinals, losing to Nicolas Kiefer, with straight-set victories over Andre Agassi and Fernando González. In the US Open, he reached the third round for the first time, but lost to Michaël Llodra. In his last tournament of the year, he reached the third round of the Paris Masters, losing to Marat Safin in straight sets.

In 2005, he reached the quarterfinals of the Adelaide International, losing to Juan Ignacio Chela. In the Australian Open he reached the third round, losing to then world No. 2, Andy Roddick, in a tough three-setter. At the SAP Open, he lost in the semifinals to Cyril Saulnier, but earned his third victory over Andre Agassi en route. He reached his second semifinal of the year at the U.S. Clay Court Championships, but lost to Andy Roddick. He reached his second ATP tour final at the Hypo Group Tennis International, but lost to Nikolay Davydenko in three sets. At Roand Garros and Wimbledon, Melzer reached the third round and lost to Guillermo Coria on both occasions. He then lost six straight main-draw matches in the Austrian Open to Fernando Verdasco, and the Rogers Cup, Cincinnati Masters, New Haven Open, US Open, and Open de Moselle. He then continued his bad run with second-round losses at the Vienna Open, the Madrid Masters, and the St. Petersburg Open.

In 2006, he continued his bad run with a 1–8 record and a seven-match losing streak in the first three months, with his only win coming in the Sydney International over Juan Ignacio Chela. He then rebounded in the U.S. Clay Court Championships, where he reached his third final without dropping a set, but lost to Mardy Fish. He also reached the semifinals of the BMW Open, losing to eventual champion Olivier Rochus, and the quarterfinals of the Hypo Group Tennis International, losing to Jiří Novák. However, he fell in the first rounds of the French Open and Wimbledon. At the Hall of Fame Open, he reached the semifinals, but was upset by eventual champion Mark Philippoussis. He also reached the quarterfinals of the Austrian Open and the New Haven Open. He then suffered two losses to Juan Mónaco in the third round of the Mercedes Cup and the first round of the Warsaw Open. At the US Open, he lost to Alessio di Mauro, thus not winning a single Grand Slam match in the year. He then reached back-to-back finals at the Romanian Open and the Open de Moselle. He won his first ATP Tour title at the Romanian Open, defeating Filippo Volandri in straight sets in the final, with victories over Gilles Simon and Paul-Henri Mathieu. At the Open de Moselle, he lost to Novak Djokovic. He ended the year with a quarterfinal showing at the Vienna Open, losing to Andy Roddick, but earned his first win over Juan Carlos Ferrero. He made a first-round exit at the St. Petersburg Open, losing to Lukáš Dlouhý.

=== 2007–2009 ===
In 2007, Melzer began the year with a first-round exit at the Qatar Open and a semifinal exit at the Medibank International, withdrawing against James Blake. Melzer reached the second rounds of the Australian Open, the M.K. Championships, the Indian Wells Masters, and the Miami Masters. He also reached the final of the Tennis Channel Open, losing to Lleyton Hewitt. He also reached the quarterfinals of the U.S. Clay Court Championships and the BMW Open. In the Masters Series on clay, he lost in the first rounds at Monte-Carlo and Rome, and the third round of the Hamburg Masters, losing to Fernando González. After that, he suffered back-to-back losses to Juan Mónaco in the Hypo Group Tennis International and the French Open. He then suffered a left wrist injury in his first-round loss to Nikolay Davydenko in the Gerry Weber Open which caused him to miss two months of tennis, including Wimbledon. He came back at the Cincinnati Masters, reaching the third round and losing to Lleyton Hewitt. From then on, he was unable to secure back-to-back wins.

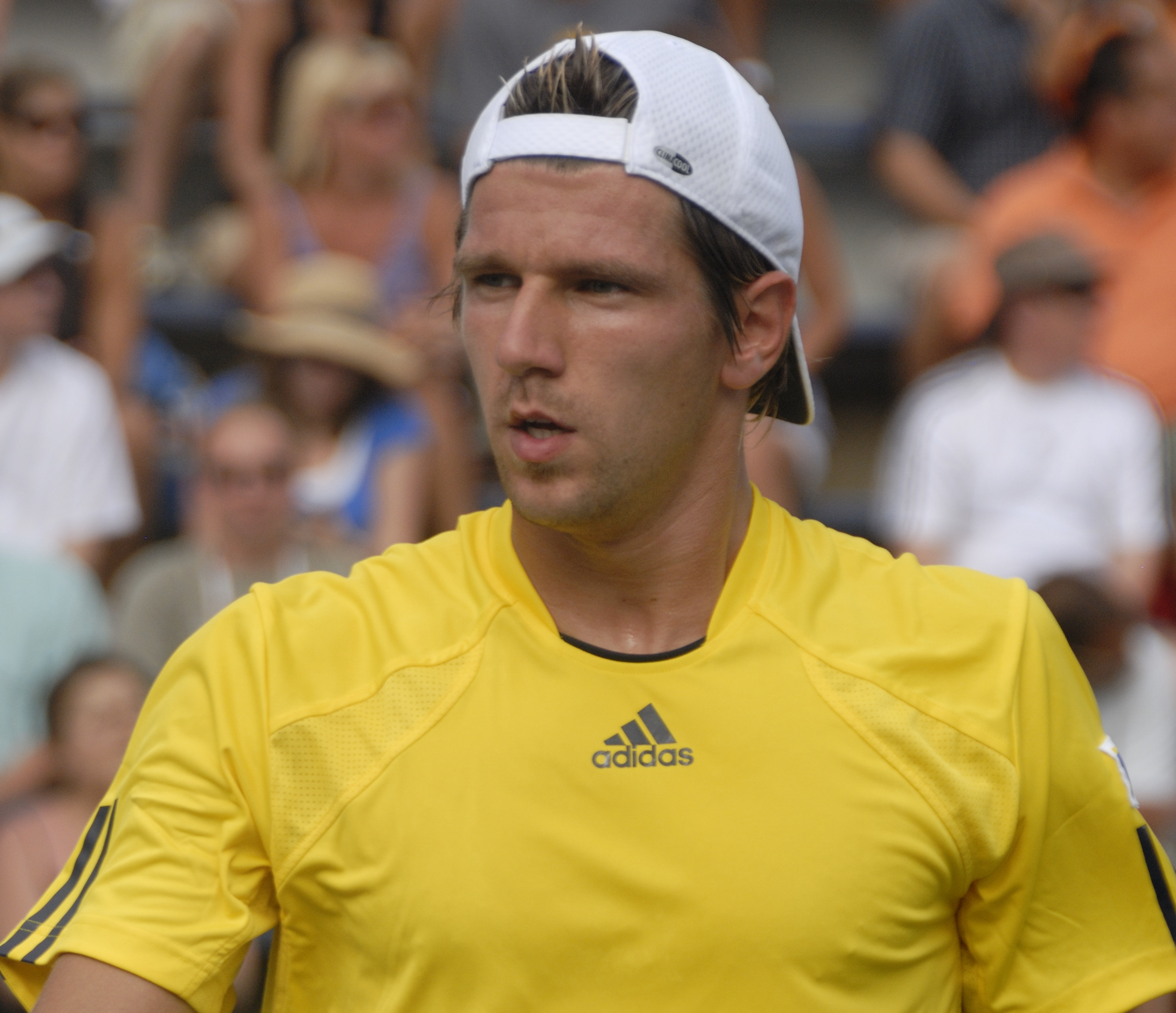
Melzer at the 2008 US Open

In 2008, Melzer reached the second round of his first three tournaments, including the Australian Open. He again failed to secure back-to-back wins, compiling a 3–9 record in his next nine tournaments and putting him out of the top 100 since April 2003. It was not until the Hypo Group Tennis International that he recorded back-to-back wins by reaching the quarterfinals, losing to Igor Kunitsyn in three sets. He carried his good performance through the French Open with a third-round exit to Frenchman Gaël Monfils, having led two sets to one. On grass, he was able to reach the quarterfinals of the Ordina Open and the third round at Wimbledon. He then returned to clay at the Austrian Open and reached his seventh final, but lost once again to Juan Martín del Potro. Melzer made a good performance at the Beijing Olympics by reaching the final eight, losing to eventual gold medalist Rafael Nadal. He then had a good performance by reaching the third rounds of the Pilot Pen Tennis and the US Open. Melzer made a good year end with quarterfinal results in the Thailand Open and the Vienna Open, which put him back to the top 40.

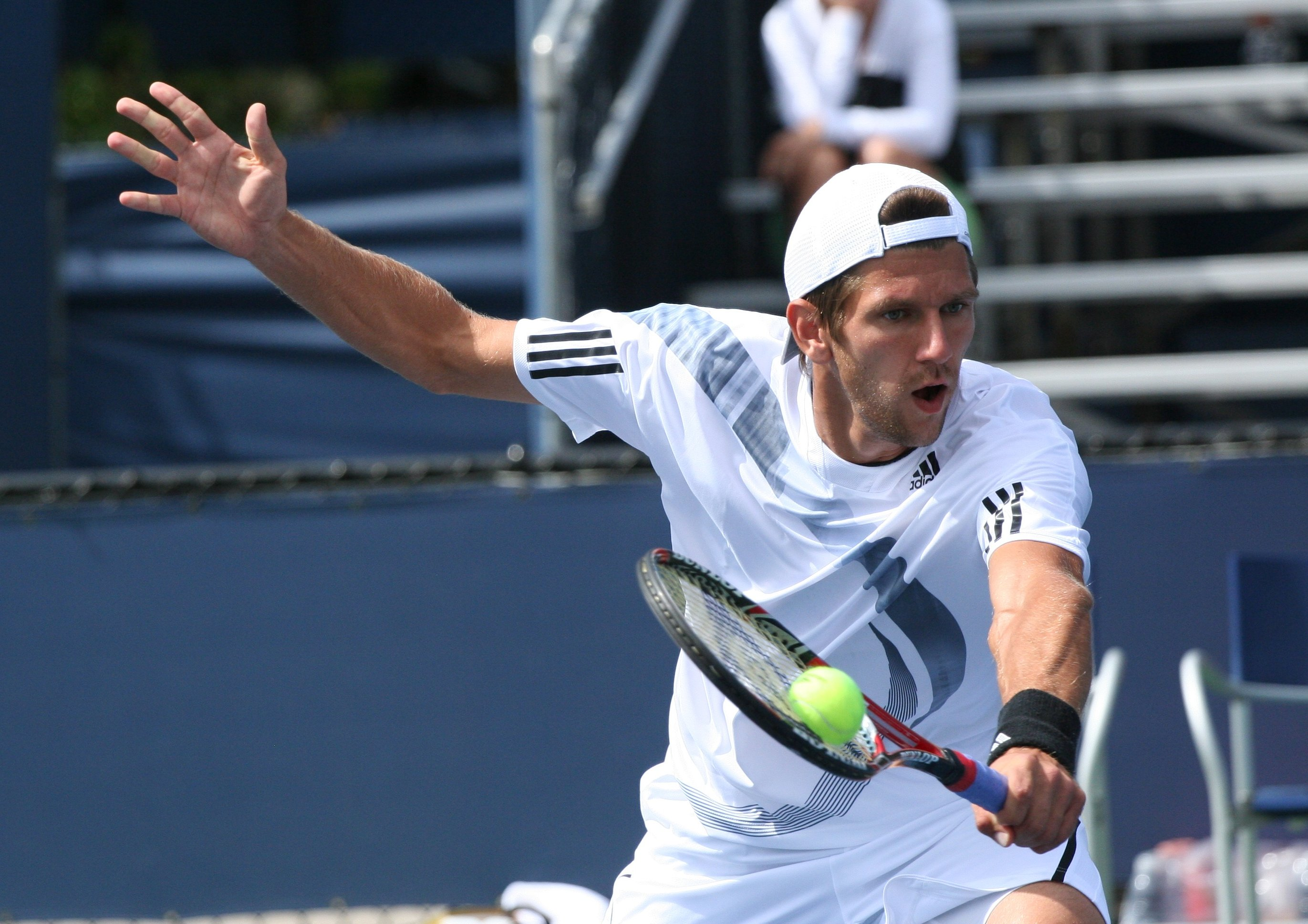
Melzer at the 2009 US Open

In 2009, Melzer again made a poor first quarter of the year, only managing one back-to-back win in his first ten tournaments, and it was at the Australian Open, where he reached the third round, losing to Andy Murray. It was not until the Italian Open that he recorded back-to-back wins, including a win over Nikolay Davydenko, but lost to Fernando González in the following round. He then reached the quarterfinals of the Austrian Open and the Gerry Weber Open once again, and the third round of the French Open and Wimbledon for the second year in a row. He reach his first semifinal of a year at the Croatia Open, but lost to eventual champion Nikolay Davydenko. He also reached the quarterfinals of the Pilot Pen Tennis with a victory over Victor Hănescu, but lost in the following round to Fernando Verdasco. In the semifinal of Thailand Open Melzer lost to eventual champion Gilles Simon in two sets. At the Shanghai Masters, Melzer defeated a then-world No. 5, Juan Martín del Potro, before losing to Feliciano López. This was his second victory over a top-5 player. The first was his win over a then-world No. 2, Tommy Haas, in 2002. He ended 2009 on a high note by winning his second career title at the Bank Austria-TennisTrophy over Marin Čilić in straight sets, which included a victory over Radek Štěpánek in the quarterfinals.

=== 2010: French Open semi-final, top 10 doubles debut ===
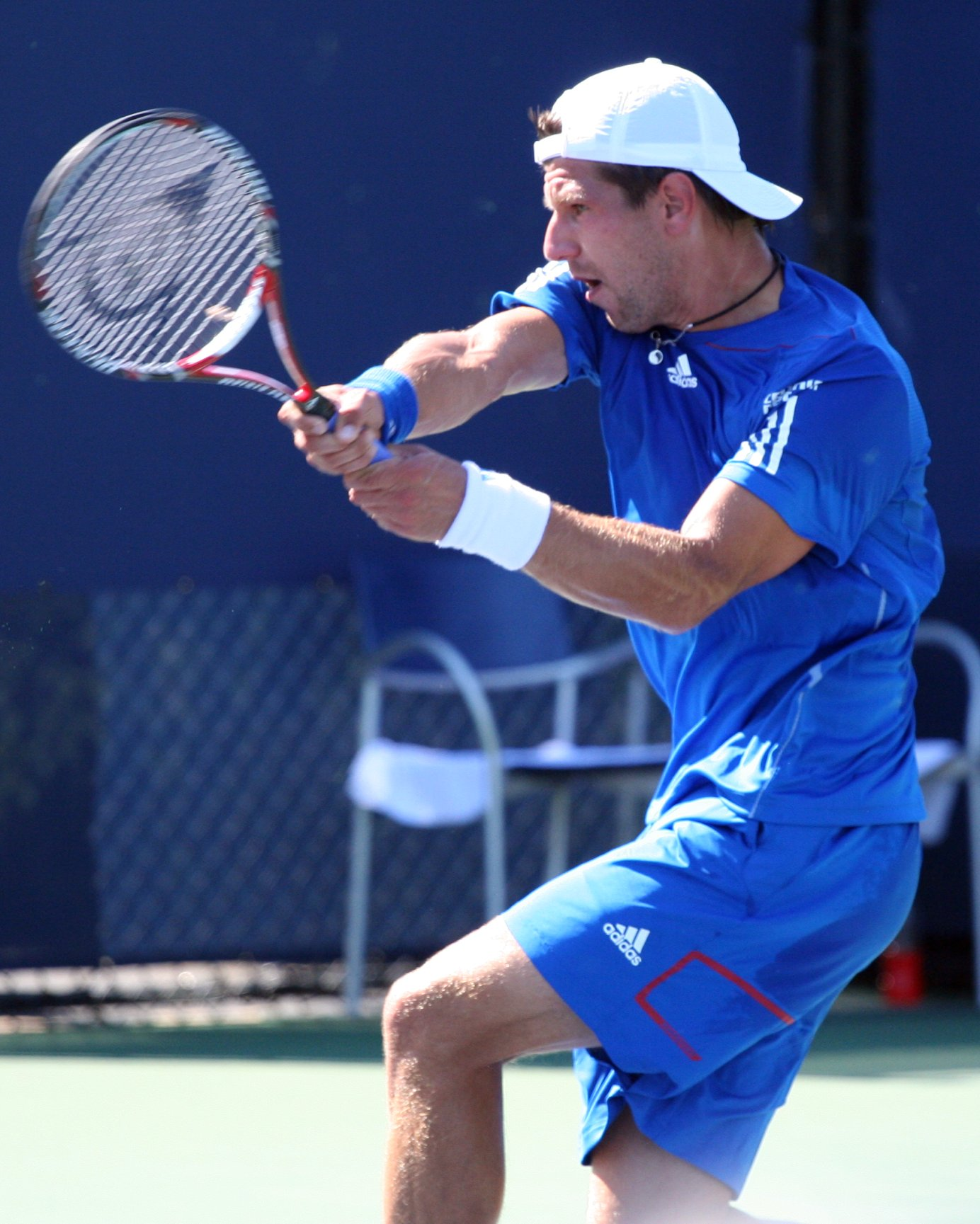
Melzer at the 2010 US Open

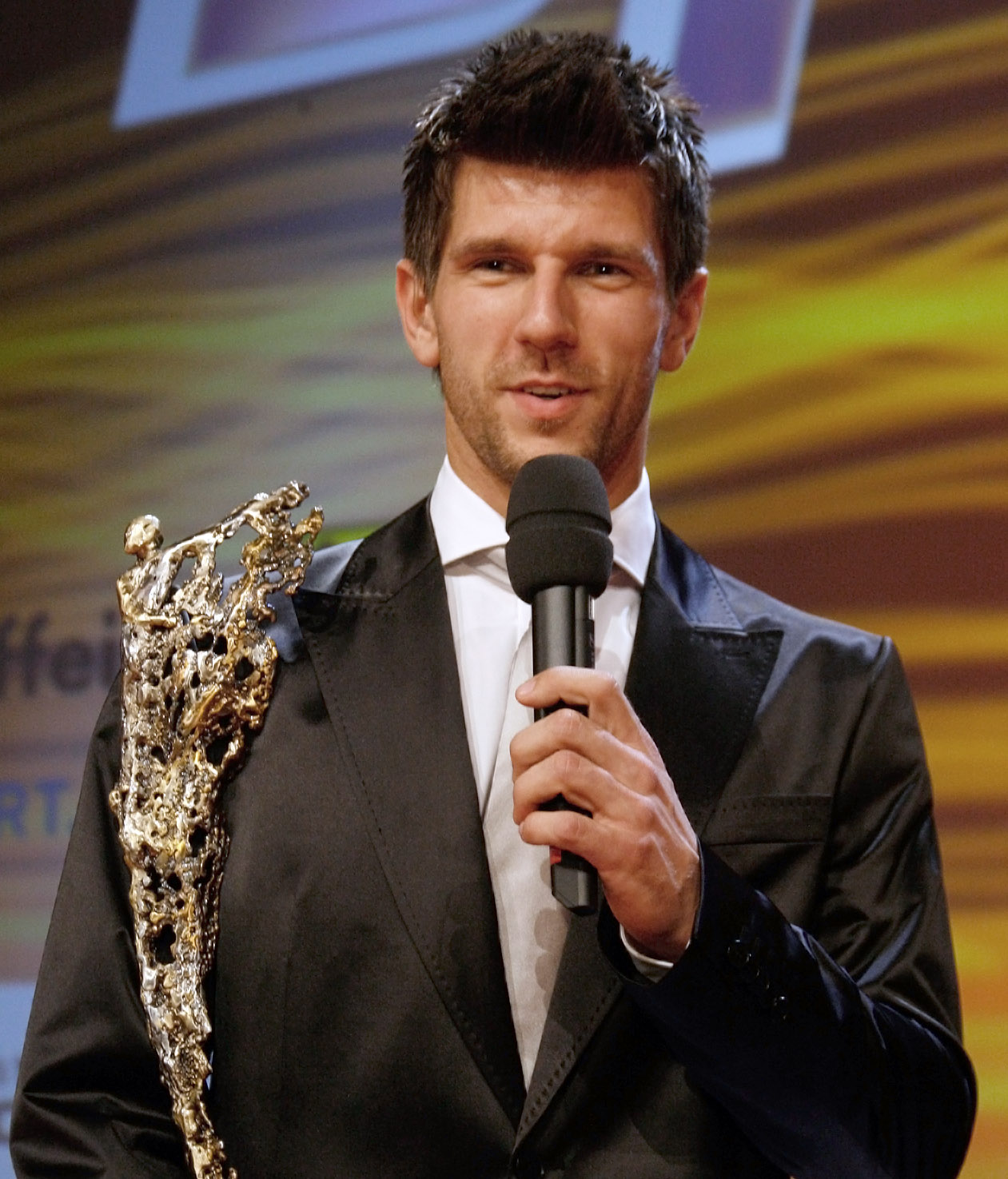
Melzer with the 2010 "Austrian Sportsman of the Year" trophy

Melzer lost in the first round of the Australian Open at the start of the season, but then reached the semifinals in Zagreb, losing to defending/eventual champion Marin Čilić. After a quarterfinal appearance in Rotterdam, where he lost to Nikolay Davydenko, Melzer reached the semifinals in Dubai, where he lost to Mikhail Youzhny. Later in the year, Melzer reached the quarterfinals of the ATP Masters 1000 in Madrid, losing to Nicolás Almagro. Melzer followed this up with his best result in a Grand Slam to date by reaching the semifinals of the French Open. He beat Dudi Sela and Nicolas Mahut before he caused a significant upset by defeating ninth seed David Ferrer in straight sets, followed by a four-set win over Teymuraz Gabashvili (who had beaten Andy Roddick in the previous round), and by a five set triumph over Novak Djokovic, coming back from a two-set deficit for the first time in his career. He was eventually defeated by four-time champion Rafael Nadal, in straight sets.

Melzer followed this up by reaching the fourth round of Wimbledon, where he was defeated by Roger Federer in their first career meeting. However, at the same tournament, he achieved his greatest success by winning the doubles title with German partner Philipp Petzschner.

After playing a few clay-court tournaments, reaching the final in one, and having good results in the others, Melzer moved on to the hard-court season, losing to Peter Polansky in the first round of Montreal and Ernests Gulbis in the second round of Cincinnati. He then played the US Open, where he reached the fourth round for the third consecutive Grand Slam tournament, having never been past the third round prior to the French Open. He played Roger Federer for a spot in the quarterfinals, having also played him in the fourth round of Wimbledon. Federer once again defeated him in straight sets.

At the Shanghai Masters in October, Melzer recorded one of the biggest wins of his career against world No. 1, Rafael Nadal. This was Melzer's first victory against Nadal and the first time he had beaten a reigning no. 1. He then lost to Argentina's Juan Mónaco in the quarterfinals.

In the last week of October 2009, he won his third career title, defending his 2009 victory at the Vienna Open against his compatriot Andreas Haider-Maurer. Coming back from a set and a break down at 3-5 down, Melzer eventually did defeat Haider-Maurer, causing him to be the first player to successfully defend the title in Vienna since Ivan Ljubičić in 2005-2006.

On 3 November, he was named Austrian Sportsman of the Year.

Melzer's final tournament of the year as a singles player was the Paris Masters, where he advanced to the quarterfinals, before losing to world No. 2, Roger Federer.

As a result of winning the Wimbledon doubles championship, Melzer and his doubles partner Petzschner qualified for a doubles team spot in the ATP Tour Finals, but his bid to qualify as a singles player ended when Andy Roddick defeated Ernests Gulbis in the third round of the Paris Masters, giving Roddick an insurmountable lead in qualifying points for the last individual spot in the ATP World Tour Finals.

=== 2011: Top 10 debut in singles ===
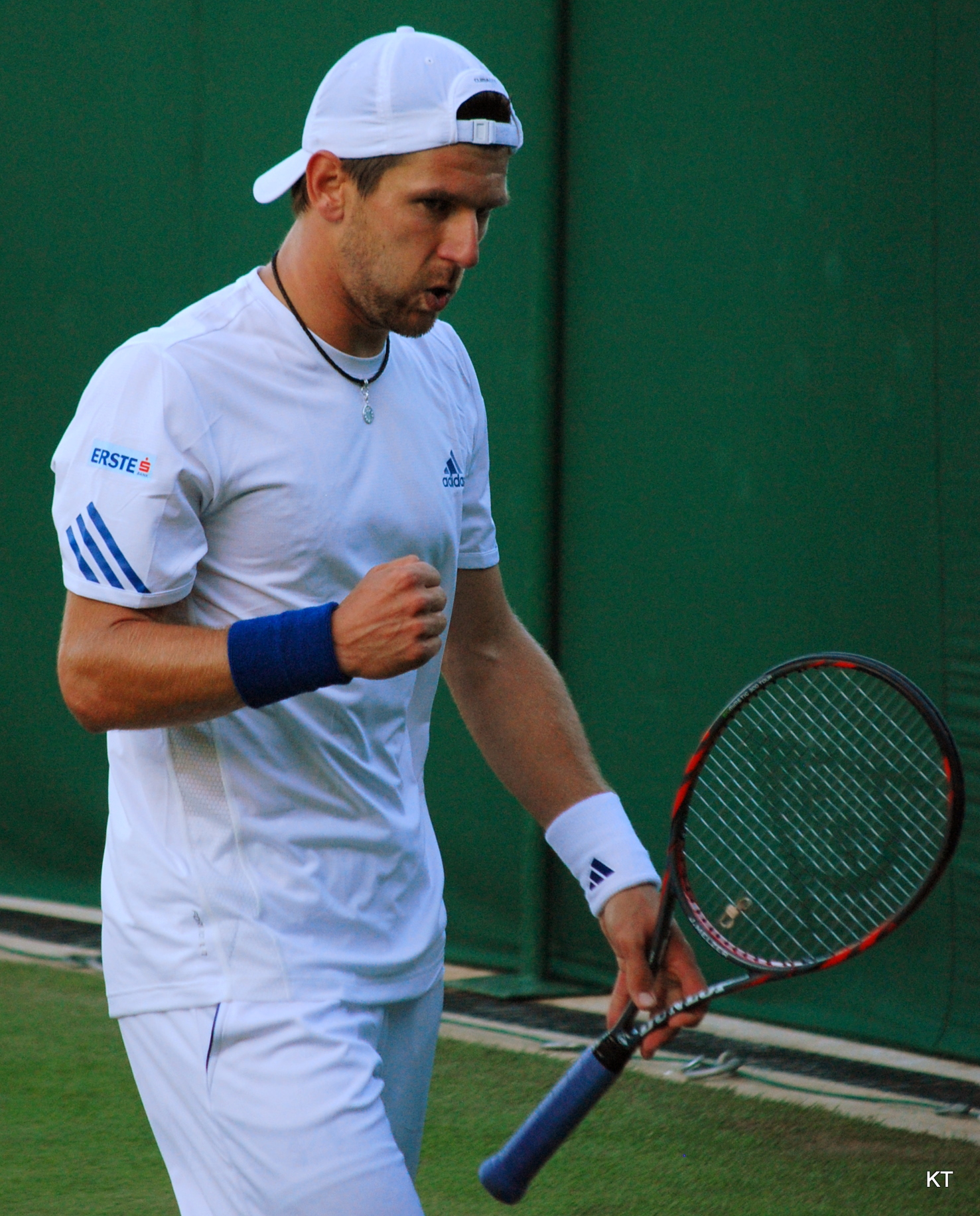
Melzer at Wimbledon in 2011

Melzer started the year at the Australian Open. He reached the third round without dropping a set, before defeating 21st seed Marcos Baghdatis in the third round after Baghdatis retired with Melzer leading. He was defeated by Andy Murray in the fourth round. Despite the loss, Melzer cracked the top 10 for the first time in his career.

Since then, Melzer failed to chalk up any back-to-back wins until appearing at the Monte-Carlo Masters. Seeded ninth, he finally won consecutive matches as he beat Robin Haase, and Nicolás Almagro, to reach the quarterfinals for the first time in this tournament. There, he pulled off a surprise two-set win over No. 3 ranked and second seed Roger Federer to reach the semifinal stage for the first time in an ATP Masters 1000 tournament. However, he failed to reach his first final in such a tournament after losing against David Ferrer.

In the 2011 US Open men's doubles final, he arguably had his greatest success of the year when he and his doubles partner Philipp Petzschner won a controversial decision over the Polish team of Mariusz Fyrstenberg and Marcin Matkowski to claim the trophy. During a net exchange, a ball ricocheted off Petzschner's left shin, though he denied it. Instant replay of the telecast clearly confirmed the illegal return. Jurgen/Petzschner broke through in that game and won the match in straight sets, splitting a $420,000 purse.

=== 2012 ===
In singles, Melzer had an inauspicious start to the year, exiting in the first round in Brisbane and the Australian Open. He did make the final in Brisbane in doubles, partnering Philipp Petzschner, and he won the tournament in Memphis against Canadian Milos Raonic.

In Monte Carlo, he made the quarterfinals in doubles, partnering Florian Mayer. After that, he had a series of quick exits in singles: the first round at the French Open, the second at Wimbledon, and the first at the US Open. However, he made it to the semifinals at Wimbledon in doubles.

He partnered with Leander Paes in Canada and made it to the semifinals, losing to the Bryan brothers.

The fall went somewhat better in singles, with a quarterfinal showing in Shanghai and a semifinal in Valencia. He also made quarterfinal showings in Beijing and Shanghai and a semifinal in Vienna, with various partners. However, the Paris Masters was back to a first-round exit in singles against Grigor Dimitrov and a first-match defeat in doubles.

=== 2013 ===
Melzer made the quarterfinals in Brisbane, where he was eliminated by Grigor Dimitrov. At the Australian Open, he was defeated in the third round in straight sets by Tomáš Berdych.

He made the final in Zagreb, only to lose to Marin Čilić in straight sets. He went out in the first round at Indian Wells, but made it to the quarterfinals in Miami, losing to David Ferrer in three sets. He was eliminated in the third round at Monte Carlo by Jo-Wilfried Tsonga.

He made a quick first-round exit at the French Open, but made it to the fourth round at Wimbledon, losing to young rising player Jerzy Janowicz.

At Wimbledon, he made it to the quarterfinals in doubles.

His only singles tournament victory was in Winston-Salem, where he defeated Gaël Monfils, when the Frenchman had to retire in the second set. After that, Melzer was defeated in the first round of the US Open in straight sets by Evgeny Donskoy. He made it to the semifinals in Kuala Lumpur, losing to Portuguese João Sousa in three tight sets.

=== 2014 ===
Melzer pulled out of the Australian Open with a shoulder injury. At the ATP 500 Barcelona, he reached the third round by defeating Jerzy Janowicz, but lost to Philipp Kohlschreiber. At the Rome Masters he defeated John Isner and Marin Čilić to reach the third round, where he lost to Andy Murray. The Austrian won over David Goffin at Roland Garros to reach the second round, where he fell to Jo-Wilfried Tsonga. At s-Hertogenbosch, he defeated Fernando Verdasco in the quarterfinals and lost to Roberto Bautista Agut in the semifinals. Melzer defeated Guillermo García López in the first round of the Paris Masters and lost again to Tsonga in the second round.

=== 2015 ===
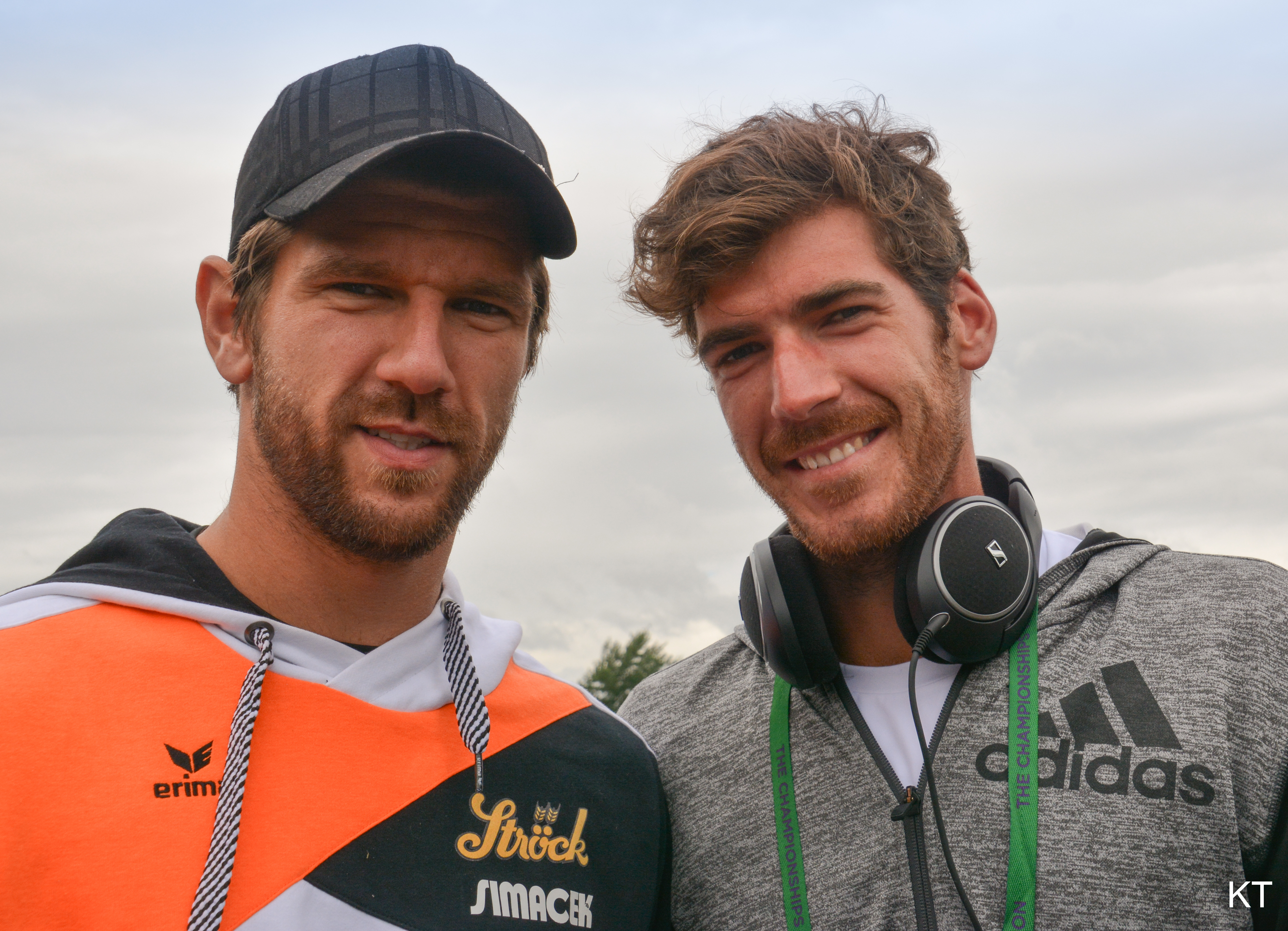
Jürgen Melzer with his brother Gerald in 2015

Melzer failed to qualify for Wimbledon in 2015. Notably, he faced his younger brother Gerald in the first round qualifying and won in straight sets. Jürgen described it as the "worst tennis day of my life and I hope we will never play each other again.".

=== 2016 ===
In July, Melzer upset world No. 9, Dominic Thiem, at the Austrian Open after a long injury absence. This was his first victory over a top-10 player in over five years. In the next round, the quarterfinal, he lost to his brother Gerald.

=== 2017 ===
Melzer qualified for the Australian Open, but lost to the eventual champion Roger Federer in the first round.

=== 2018: Retirement from singles ===
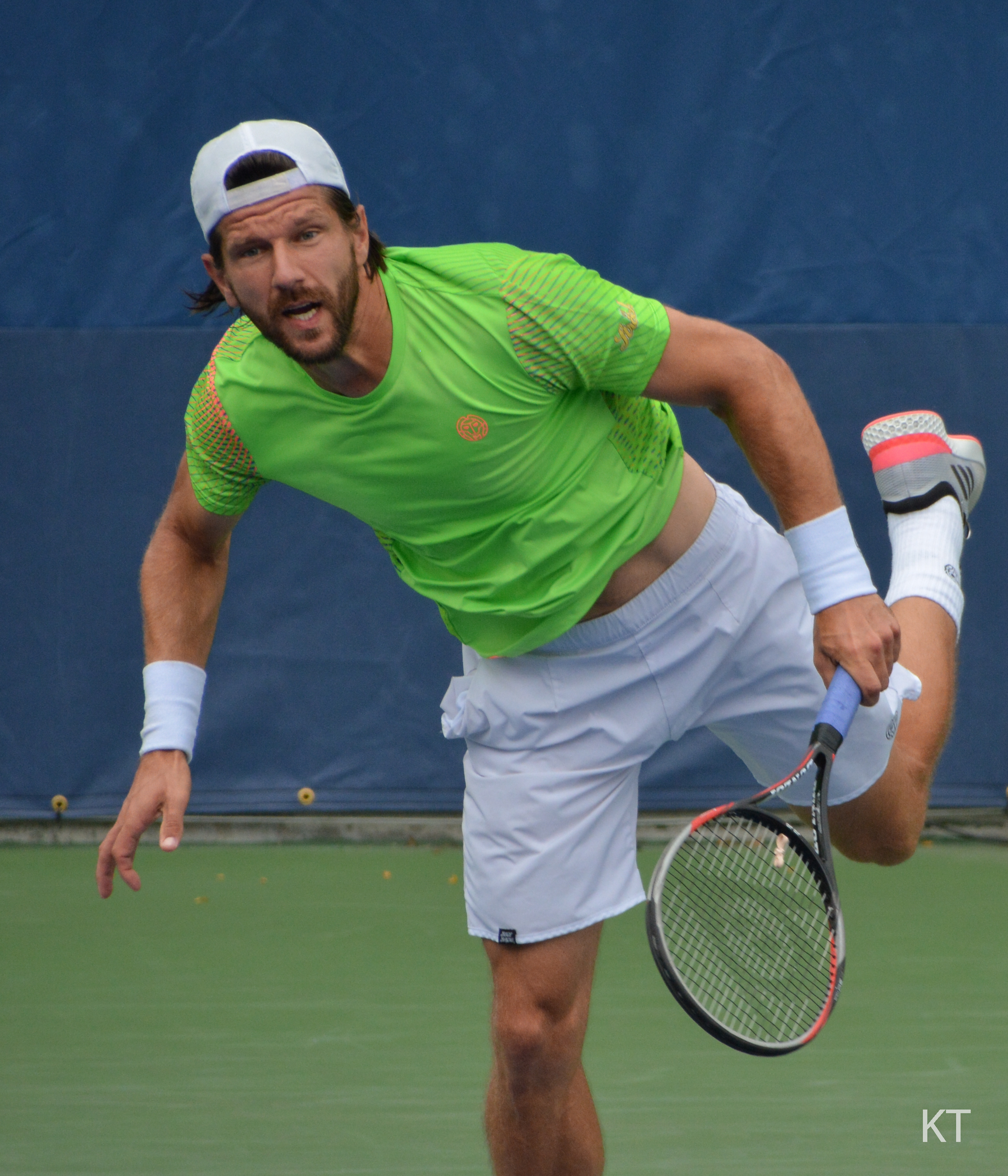
Melzer at the 2018 US Open

Melzer announced his retirement from the ATP Tour in singles, with the Vienna Open marking his final appearance. Ranked at world No. 426, he upset No. 22 Milos Raonic in the first round. This victory was his 350th and final career win, because he withdrew from the second round due to illness.

=== 2019: First doubles title in 5 years ===
Melzer won the doubles title at the Sofia Open, partnering Nikola Mektić.

=== 2020: ATP Finals runner-up in doubles ===
In October, Melzer announced his retirement from professional tennis after the 2021 Australian Open.

He qualified for the third time for the ATP Finals in doubles, this time with partner Édouard Roger-Vasselin. They reached the final, which they lost to Wesley Koolhof and Nikola Mektić.

=== 2021: Retirement from tour ===
Contrary to his announcement, Melzer did not play at the Australian Open due to COVID-19 quarantine measures. Instead, he played in the doubles competitions of the other three Grand Slam tournaments where he each lost in the first round. He played his final tournament on the ATP Tour at the Vienna Open, where he partnered Alexander Zverev and also lost in the first round.

=== Coaching ===
After retiring from tennis, he began coaching compatriot Joel Schwärzler at the ÖTV performance centre in Südstadt. In October 2023, Schwärzler won the ITF Junior Masters event in Chengdu.

== Performance timelines ==
Key
W	F	SF	QF	#R	RR	Q#	P#	DNQ	A	Z#	PO	G	S	B	NMS	NTI	P	NH

(W) winner; (F) finalist; (SF) semifinalist; (QF) quarterfinalist; (#R) rounds 4, 3, 2, 1; (RR) round-robin stage; (Q#) qualification round; (P#) preliminary round; (DNQ) did not qualify; (A) absent; (Z#) Davis/Fed Cup Zonal Group (with number indication) or (PO) play-off; (G) gold, (S) silver or (B) bronze Olympic/Paralympic medal; (NMS) not a Masters tournament; (NTI) not a Tier I tournament; (P) postponed; (NH) not held; (SR) strike rate (events won / competed); (W–L) win–loss record.
To avoid confusion and double counting, these charts are updated at the conclusion of a tournament or when the player's participation has ended.

=== Singles ===
Tournament	1999	2000	2001	2002	2003	2004	2005	2006	2007	2008	2009	2010	2011	2012	2013	2014	2015	2016	2017	2018	SR	W–L	Win%
Grand Slam tournaments
Australian Open	A	A	A	Q2	1R	3R	3R	1R	2R	2R	3R	1R	4R	1R	3R	A	2R	A	1R	A	0 / 13	14–13	52%
French Open	A	A	A	A	1R	2R	3R	1R	2R	3R	3R	SF	2R	1R	1R	2R	2R	A	A	Q2	0 / 13	16–13	55%
Wimbledon	A	1R	Q1	1R	2R	1R	3R	1R	A	3R	3R	4R	3R	2R	4R	1R	Q2	A	Q1	Q3	0 / 13	16–13	55%
US Open	A	A	A	2R	2R	3R	1R	1R	2R	3R	2R	4R	2R	1R	1R	1R	2R	Q2	A	Q1	0 / 14	13–14	48%
Win–loss	0–0	0–1	0–0	1–2	2–4	5–4	6–4	0–4	3–3	7–4	7–4	11–4	7–4	1–4	5–4	1–3	3–3	0–0	0–1	0–0	0 / 53	59–53	53%
National representation
Summer Olympics	NH	A	Not Held			1R	Not Held			QF	Not Held			1R	Not Held			A	Not Held		0 / 3	3–3	50%
Davis Cup	PO	1R	Z1	Z1	PO	1R	1R	1R	1R	1R	1R	Z1	1R	QF	1R	Z1	Z1	Z1	Z1	PO	0 / 10	22–29	43%
ATP Tour Masters 1000
Indian Wells Masters	A	A	A	A	Q1	1R	3R	1R	2R	2R	3R	4R	3R	2R	1R	A	2R	A	A	A	0 / 11	6–11	35%
Miami Open	A	A	A	A	Q1	3R	1R	1R	2R	2R	2R	3R	2R	3R	QF	A	2R	A	A	A	0 / 11	10–11	48%
Monte-Carlo Masters	A	A	A	Q1	A	A	1R	A	1R	A	1R	2R	SF	2R	3R	1R	A	A	A	A	0 / 8	7–8	47%
Madrid Open	Not Held			A	A	A	2R	A	1R	A	2R	QF	2R	2R	1R	1R	A	A	A	A	0 / 8	6–8	43%
German Open	A	A	A	A	A	QF	1R	1R	3R	Q1	Not Masters Series										0 / 4	5–4	56%
Italian Open	A	A	A	A	Q1	A	1R	A	1R	A	3R	1R	2R	1R	1R	3R	Q1	A	A	A	0 / 8	4–8	33%
Canadian Open	A	A	A	A	A	QF	1R	A	1R	A	1R	1R	A	1R	1R	1R	A	A	A	A	0 / 8	3–8	27%
Cincinnati Masters	A	A	A	A	A	1R	1R	A	3R	A	2R	2R	1R	1R	1R	1R	A	A	A	A	0 / 9	4–9	31%
Shanghai Masters	Not Held										3R	QF	2R	1R	2R	A	A	A	A	A	0 / 5	7–5	58%
Paris Masters	A	A	A	A	A	3R	A	A	1R	A	A	QF	A	1R	A	2R	A	A	A	A	0 / 5	5–5	50%
Win–loss	0–0	0–0	0–0	0–0	0–0	10–6	2–8	0–3	4–9	2–2	7–8	12–9	5–7	3–9	7–8	3–6	2–2	0–0	0–0	0–0	0 / 77	57–77	43%
Career statistics
	1999	2000	2001	2002	2003	2004	2005	2006	2007	2008	2009	2010	2011	2012	2013	2014	2015	2016	2017	2018	Career		
Tournaments	1	3	1	9	18	23	25	26	24	24	27	26	21	24	24	20	11	3	1	1	312		
Titles	0	0	0	0	0	0	0	1	0	0	1	1	0	1	1	0	0	0	0	0	5		
Finals	0	0	0	0	1	0	1	3	1	1	1	2	0	1	2	0	0	0	0	0	13		
Overall win–loss	1–1	0–5	1–1	10–11	14–20	27–27	26–26	33–26	23–25	30–26	36–29	51–25	22–23	20–25	25–27	16–20	9–12	4–3	0–2	2–0	350–334		
Win %	50%	0%	50%	48%	41%	50%	50%	56%	48%	54%	55%	67%	49%	44%	48%	44%	43%	57%	0%	100%	51%		
Year-end ranking	491	358	168	91	79	39	54	41	60	34	28	11	34	29	27	113	155	306	186	288			

=== Doubles ===
Current through the 2021 Vienna Open.

Tournament	1999	2000	2001	2002	2003	2004	2005	2006	2007	2008	2009	2010	2011	2012	2013	2014	2015	2016	2017	2018	2019	2020	2021	SR	W–L	Win%
Grand Slam tournaments
Australian Open	A	A	A	A	A	2R	SF	3R	3R	2R	1R	3R	QF	3R	1R	A	1R	A	2R	A	A	2R	A	0 / 13	19–13	59%
French Open	A	A	A	A	A	1R	QF	3R	A	2R	2R	1R	A	3R	2R	3R	A	A	A	A	2R	3R	1R	0 / 12	14–12	54%
Wimbledon	A	A	A	A	1R	A	3R	1R	A	2R	1R	W	QF	SF	QF	2R	2R	A	A	1R	2R	NH	1R	1 / 14	22–13	63%
US Open	A	A	A	A	2R	2R	2R	2R	1R	2R	3R	1R	W	2R	1R	2R	1R	2R	A	3R	QF	1R	1R	1 / 18	20–17	56%
Win–loss	0–0	0–0	0–0	0–0	1–2	2–3	12–4	5–4	2–4	4–4	3–4	9–3	15–2	10–4	5–4	4–3	1–3	1–1	1–1	2–2	4–3	3–3	0–3	2 / 57	75–55	58%
Year-end championship
ATP Finals	Did not qualify											RR	RR	Did not qualify								F	DNQ	0 / 3	5–6	45%
National representation
Summer Olympics	NH	A	Not Held			A	Not Held			2R	Not Held			2R	Not Held			A	Not Held				A	0 / 2	2–2	50%
Davis Cup	PO	1R	Z1	Z1	PO	1R	1R	1R	1R	1R	1R	Z1	1R	QF	1R	Z1	Z1	Z1	Z1	PO	QR	QR	A	0 / 10	15–12	56%
ATP Tour Masters 1000
Indian Wells Masters	A	A	A	A	A	A	1R	QF	SF	A	1R	1R	2R	A	A	A	1R	A	A	A	A	NH	A	0 / 7	6–7	46%
Miami Open	A	A	A	A	A	A	A	A	2R	1R	SF	1R	SF	1R	1R	A	2R	A	A	A	A	NH	A	0 / 8	8–8	50%
Monte-Carlo Masters	A	A	A	A	A	A	A	A	A	A	A	2R	2R	QF	QF	1R	A	A	A	A	2R	NH	A	0 / 6	6–6	50%
Madrid Open	Not Held			A	A	A	A	A	A	A	1R	1R	A	2R	2R	QF	2R	A	A	A	A	NH	A	0 / 6	3–6	33%
German Open	A	A	A	A	A	A	A	2R	A	A	Not Masters Series													0 / 1	1–1	50%
Italian Open	A	A	A	A	A	A	1R	A	1R	A	2R	A	A	2R	2R	2R	1R	A	A	A	2R	SF	A	0 / 9	7–9	44%
Canadian Open	A	A	A	A	A	A	A	A	A	A	2R	QF	A	SF	2R	1R	A	A	A	A	1R	NH	A	0 / 6	4–5	50%
Cincinnati Masters	A	A	A	A	A	A	A	A	1R	A	1R	2R	2R	1R	2R	1R	A	A	A	A	1R	2R	A	0 / 9	2–9	18%
Shanghai Masters	Not Held										SF	W	2R	QF	A	A	A	A	A	A	1R	NH		1 / 5	9–4	69%
Paris Masters	A	A	A	A	A	A	A	1R	2R	A	A	A	A	2R	A	F	A	A	A	A	2R	SF	A	0 / 6	8–6	55%
Win–loss	0–0	0–0	0–0	0–0	0–0	0–0	0–2	3–3	5–5	0–1	8–7	6–6	4–5	6–8	4–5	7–6	2–4	0–0	0–0	0–0	3–6	6–3	0–0	1 / 63	54–61	47%
Career statistics
	1999	2000	2001	2002	2003	2004	2005	2006	2007	2008	2009	2010	2011	2012	2013	2014	2015	2016	2017	2018	2019	2020	2021	Career		
Tournaments	1	0	0	3	10	13	18	23	14	21	27	24	18	20	21	20	15	4	3	8	23	17	4	307		
Titles	0	0	0	0	0	0	1	2	0	1	2	3	3	0	0	1	0	0	0	0	3	1	0	17		
Finals	0	0	0	1	2	0	1	6	2	3	3	4	3	1	0	2	1	1	0	0	4	3	0	37		
Overall win–loss	3–2	0–0	0–2	3–4	11–10	9–13	22–17	39–21	18–13	22–20	34–25	31–23	28–16	24–20	19–19	23–18	10–17	5–4	3–3	9–9	31–20	31–17	0–4	375–297		
Win %	67%	–	0%	43%	52%	41%	56%	65%	58%	52%	58%	57%	64%	55%	50%	56%	37%	56%	50%	50%	61%	65%	0%	56%		
Year-end ranking	330	650	505	181	83	101	28	22	53	46	26	8	13	29	51	35	107	162	214	134	36	21	84			

=== Mixed doubles ===
Tournament	2006	2007	2008	2009	2010	2011	2012	2013	2014	2015	2016	2017	2018	2019	2020	2021	SR	W–L
Grand Slam tournaments
Australian Open	1R	A	A	QF	A	A	2R	A	A	A	A	A	A	A	1R	A	0 / 4	3–4
French Open	2R	1R	A	A	A	A	A	A	1R	A	A	A	A	A	NH	A	0 / 3	1–3
Wimbledon	A	A	A	A	A	W	1R	A	1R	1R	A	A	A	1R	NH	A	1 / 5	4–4
US Open	A	A	1R	A	A	1R	1R	A	A	A	A	A	A	A	NH	A	0 / 3	0–3
Win–loss	1–2	0–1	0–1	2–1	0–0	4–1	1–3	0–0	0–2	0–1	0–0	0–0	0–0	0–1	0–1	0–0	1 / 15	8–14

== Significant finals ==
=== Grand Slam finals ===
==== Doubles: 2 (2 titles) ====
Result	Year	Championship	Surface	Partner	Opponents	Score
Win	2010	Wimbledon	Grass	(Germany) Philipp Petzschner	(Romania) Horia Tecău (Sweden) Robert Lindstedt	6–1, 7–5, 7–5
Win	2011	US Open	Hard	(Germany) Philipp Petzschner	(Poland) Mariusz Fyrstenberg (Poland) Marcin Matkowski	6–2, 6–2

==== Mixed doubles: 1 (1 title) ====
Result	Year	Championship	Surface	Partner	Opponents	Score
Win	2011	Wimbledon	Grass	(Czech Republic) Iveta Benešová	(India) Mahesh Bhupathi (Russia) Elena Vesnina	6–3, 6–2

=== Year-end championships ===
==== Doubles: 1 (1 runner-up) ====
Result	Year	Championship	Surface	Partner	Opponents	Score
Loss	2020	ATP Finals, London	Hard (i)	(France) Édouard Roger-Vasselin	(Netherlands) Wesley Koolhof (Croatia) Nikola Mektić	2–6, 6–3, [5–10]

=== Masters 1000 finals ===
==== Doubles: 2 (1 title, 1 runner-up) ====
Result	Year	Tournament	Surface	Partner	Opponents	Score
Win	2010	Shanghai	Hard	(India) Leander Paes	(Poland) Mariusz Fyrstenberg (Poland) Marcin Matkowski	7–5, 4–6, [10–5]
Loss	2014	Paris	Hard (i)	(Poland) Marcin Matkowski	(United States) Bob Bryan (United States) Mike Bryan	6–7^{(5–7)}, 7–5, [6–10]

== ATP Tour finals ==
=== Singles: 13 (5 titles, 8 runner-ups) ===
Legend Grand Slam tournaments (0–0) ATP World Tour Masters 1000 (0–0) ATP International Series Gold / ATP World Tour 500 Series (1–2) ATP International Series / ATP World Tour 250 Series (4–6)	Finals by surface Hard (4–3) Clay (1–4) Grass (0–1)	Finals by setting Outdoor (2–6) Indoor (3–2)

Result	W–L	Date	Tournament	Tier	Surface	Opponent	Score
Loss	0–1	Jul 2003	Hall of Fame Open, United States	International	Grass	(United States) Robby Ginepri	4–6, 7–6^{(7–3)}, 1–6
Loss	0–2	May 2005	St. Pölten Open, Austria	International	Clay	(Russia) Nikolay Davydenko	3–6, 6–2, 4–6
Loss	0–3	Apr 2006	US Clay Court Championships	International	Clay	(United States) Mardy Fish	6–3, 4–6, 3–6
Win	1–3	Sep 2006	Romanian Open	International	Clay	(Italy) Filippo Volandri	6–1, 7–5
Loss	1–4	Oct 2006	Moselle Open, France	International	Hard (i)	(Serbia) Novak Djokovic	6–4, 3–6, 2–6
Loss	1–5	Mar 2007	Las Vegas Open, United States	International	Hard	(Australia) Lleyton Hewitt	4–6, 6–7^{(10–12)}
Loss	1–6	Jul 2008	Austrian Open	Intl. Gold	Clay	(Argentina) Juan Martín del Potro	2–6, 1–6
Win	2–6	Nov 2009	Vienna Open, Austria	250 Series	Hard (i)	(Croatia) Marin Čilić	6–4, 6–3
Loss	2–7	Jul 2010	German Open	500 Series	Clay	(Kazakhstan) Andrey Golubev	3–6, 5–7
Win	3–7	Oct 2010	Vienna Open, Austria (2)	250 Series	Hard (i)	(Austria) Andreas Haider-Maurer	6–7^{(10–12)}, 7–6^{(7–4)}, 6–4
Win	4–7	Feb 2012	US National Indoors	500 Series	Hard (i)	(Canada) Milos Raonic	7–5, 7–6^{(7–4)}
Loss	4–8	Feb 2013	Zagreb Indoors, Croatia	250 Series	Hard (i)	(Croatia) Marin Čilić	3–6, 1–6
Win	5–8	Aug 2013	Winston-Salem Open, United States	250 Series	Hard	(France) Gaël Monfils	6–3, 2–1 ret.

=== Doubles: 37 (17 titles, 20 runner-ups) ===
Legend Grand Slam tournaments (2–0) ATP World Tour Finals (0–1) ATP World Tour Masters 1000 (1–1) ATP International Series Gold / ATP World Tour 500 Series (4–3) ATP International Series / ATP World Tour 250 Series (10–15)	Finals by surface Hard (9–11) Clay (4–5) Grass (3–2) Carpet (1–2)	Finals by setting Outdoor (11–9) Indoor (6–11)

Result	W–L	Date	Tournament	Tier	Surface	Partner	Opponents	Score
Loss	0–1	Jul 2002	Hall of Fame Open, United States	International	Grass	(Germany) Alexander Popp	(United States) Bob Bryan (United States) Mike Bryan	5–7, 3–6
Loss	0–2	Jul 2003	Hall of Fame Open, United States	International	Grass	(Austria) Julian Knowle	(Australia) Jordan Kerr (Australia) David Macpherson	6–7^{(4–7)}, 3–6
Loss	0–3	Jul 2003	Austrian Open, Austria	Intl. Gold	Clay	(Austria) Alexander Peya	(Czech Republic) Martin Damm (Czech Republic) Cyril Suk	4–6, 4–6
Win	1–3	Oct 2005	St. Petersburg Open, Russia	International	Carpet (i)	(Austria) Julian Knowle	(Sweden) Jonas Björkman (Belarus) Max Mirnyi	4–6, 7–5, 7–5
Loss	1–4	Apr 2006	US Clay Court Championships, United States	International	Clay	(Austria) Julian Knowle	(Germany) Michael Kohlmann (Germany) Alexander Waske	7–5, 4–6, [5–10]
Win	2–4	May 2006	Grand Prix Hassan II, Morocco	International	Clay	(Austria) Julian Knowle	(Germany) Michael Kohlmann (Germany) Alexander Waske	6–3, 6–4
Win	3–4	Jul 2006	Hall of Fame Open, United States	International	Grass	(United States) Robert Kendrick	(South Africa) Jeff Coetzee (United States) Justin Gimelstob	7–6^{(7–3)}, 6–0
Loss	3–5	Oct 2006	Moselle Open, France	International	Hard (i)	(Austria) Julian Knowle	(France) Richard Gasquet (France) Fabrice Santoro	6–3, 1–6, [9–11]
Loss	3–6	Oct 2006	Vienna Open, Austria	Intl. Gold	Hard (i)	(Austria) Julian Knowle	(Czech Republic) Petr Pála (Czech Republic) Pavel Vízner	4–6, 6–3, [10–12]
Loss	3–7	Oct 2006	St. Petersburg Open, Russia	International	Carpet (i)	(Austria) Julian Knowle	(Sweden) Simon Aspelin (Australia) Todd Perry	1–6, 6–7^{(3–7)}
Loss	3–8	Feb 2007	US National Indoors, United States	Intl. Gold	Hard (i)	(Austria) Julian Knowle	(United States) Eric Butorac (United Kingdom) Jamie Murray	5–7, 3–6
Loss	3–9	Oct 2007	St. Petersburg Open, Russia	International	Carpet (i)	(Australia) Todd Perry	(Canada) Daniel Nestor (Serbia) Nenad Zimonjić	1–6, 6–7^{(3–7)}
Loss	3–10	Jan 2008	Auckland Open, New Zealand	International	Hard	(Belgium) Xavier Malisse	(Peru) Luis Horna (Argentina) Juan Mónaco	4–6, 6–3, [7–10]
Loss	3–11	May 2008	St. Pölten Open, Austria	International	Clay	(Austria) Julian Knowle	(Brazil) Marcelo Melo (Brazil) André Sá	5–7, 7–6^{(7–3)}, [11–13]
Win	4–11	Jun 2008	Rosmalen Championships, Netherlands	International	Grass	(Croatia) Mario Ančić	(India) Mahesh Bhupathi (India) Leander Paes	7–6^{(7–5)}, 6–3
Win	5–11	Aug 2009	Connecticut Open, United States	250 Series	Hard	(Austria) Julian Knowle	(Brazil) Bruno Soares (Zimbabwe) Kevin Ullyett	6–4, 7–6^{(7–3)}
Win	6–11	Oct 2009	Japan Open, Japan	500 Series	Hard	(Austria) Julian Knowle	(United Kingdom) Ross Hutchins (Australia) Jordan Kerr	6–2, 5–7, [10–8]
Loss	6–12	Nov 2009	Vienna Open, Austria	250 Series	Hard (i)	(Austria) Julian Knowle	(Poland) Łukasz Kubot (Austria) Oliver Marach	6–2, 4–6, [9–11]
Win	7–12	Feb 2010	Zagreb Indoors, Croatia	250 Series	Hard (i)	(Germany) Philipp Petzschner	(France) Arnaud Clément (Belgium) Olivier Rochus	3–6, 6–3, [10–8]
Win	8–12	Jul 2010	Wimbledon, United Kingdom	Grand Slam	Grass	(Germany) Philipp Petzschner	(Sweden) Robert Lindstedt (Romania) Horia Tecău	6–1, 7–5, 7–5
Loss	8–13	Oct 2010	Thailand Open, Thailand	250 Series	Hard (i)	(Israel) Jonathan Erlich	(Germany) Christopher Kas (Serbia) Viktor Troicki	4–6, 4–6
Win	9–13	Oct 2010	Shanghai Masters, China	Masters 1000	Hard	(India) Leander Paes	(Poland) Mariusz Fyrstenberg (Poland) Marcin Matkowski	7–5, 4–6, [10–5]
Win	10–13	Feb 2011	Rotterdam Open, Netherlands	500 Series	Hard (i)	(Germany) Philipp Petzschner	(France) Michaël Llodra (Serbia) Nenad Zimonjić	6–4, 3–6, [10–5]
Win	11–13	Jul 2011	Stuttgart Open, Germany	250 Series	Clay	(Germany) Philipp Petzschner	(Spain) Marcel Granollers (Spain) Marc López	6–3, 6–4
Win	12–13	Sep 2011	US Open, United States	Grand Slam	Hard	(Germany) Philipp Petzschner	(Poland) Mariusz Fyrstenberg (Poland) Marcin Matkowski	6–2, 6–2
Loss	12–14	Jan 2012	Brisbane International, Australia	250 Series	Hard	(Germany) Philipp Petzschner	(Belarus) Max Mirnyi (Canada) Daniel Nestor	1–6, 2–6
Win	13–14	Oct 2014	Vienna Open, Austria	250 Series	Hard (i)	(Germany) Philipp Petzschner	(Germany) Andre Begemann (Austria) Julian Knowle	7–6^{(8–6)}, 4–6, [10–7]
Loss	13–15	Nov 2014	Paris Masters, France	Masters 1000	Hard (i)	(Poland) Marcin Matkowski	(United States) Bob Bryan (United States) Mike Bryan	6–7^{(5–7)}, 7–5, [6–10]
Loss	13–16	May 2015	Istanbul Open, Turkey	250 Series	Clay	(Sweden) Robert Lindstedt	(Moldova) Radu Albot (Serbia) Dušan Lajović	4–6, 6–7^{(2–7)}
Loss	13–17	Oct 2016	Kremlin Cup, Russia	250 Series	Hard (i)	(Austria) Julian Knowle	(Colombia) Juan Sebastián Cabal (Colombia) Robert Farah	5–7, 6–4, [5–10]
Win	14–17	Feb 2019	Sofia Open, Bulgaria	250 Series	Hard (i)	(Croatia) Nikola Mektić	(Chinese Taipei) Hsieh Cheng-peng (Indonesia) Christopher Rungkat	6–2, 4–6, [10–2]
Win	15–17	Apr 2019	Grand Prix Hassan II, Morocco (2)	250 Series	Clay	(Croatia) Franko Škugor	(Netherlands) Matwé Middelkoop (Denmark) Frederik Nielsen	6–4, 7–6^{(8–6)}
Loss	15–18	Jul 2019	Croatia Open, Croatia	250 Series	Clay	(Austria) Oliver Marach	(Netherlands) Robin Haase (Austria) Philipp Oswald	5–7, 7–6^{(7–2)}, [12–14]
Win	16–18	Jul 2019	German Open, Germany	500 Series	Clay	(Austria) Oliver Marach	(Netherlands) Robin Haase (Netherlands) Wesley Koolhof	6–2, 7–6^{(7–3)}
Win	17–18	Oct 2020	St. Petersburg Open, Russia (2)	500 Series	Hard (i)	(France) Édouard Roger-Vasselin	(Brazil) Marcelo Demoliner (Netherlands) Matwé Middelkoop	6–2, 7–6^{(7–4)}
Loss	17–19	Nov 2020	Sofia Open, Bulgaria	250 Series	Hard (i)	(France) Édouard Roger-Vasselin	(United Kingdom) Jamie Murray (United Kingdom) Neal Skupski	w/o
Loss	17–20	Nov 2020	ATP Finals, London, United Kingdom	Tour Finals	Hard (i)	(France) Édouard Roger-Vasselin	(Netherlands) Wesley Koolhof (Croatia) Nikola Mektić	2–6, 6–3, [5–10]

== ATP Challenger and ITF Futures finals ==
=== Singles: 11 (5–6) ===
Legend ATP Challenger (5–5) ITF Futures (0–1)	Finals by surface Hard (4–1) Clay (1–2) Grass (0–0) Carpet (0–3)

Result	W–L	Date	Tournament	Tier	Surface	Opponent	Score
Loss	0–1	Jul 2001	Slovak Rep. F4, Poprad	Futures	Clay	(Slovakia) Juraj Hasko	6–7^{(5–7)}, 2–6
Win	1–1	Aug 2001	Mönchengladbach, Germany	Challenger	Clay	(Germany) Jens Knippschild	4–6, 6–1, 6–3
Loss	1–2	Jan 2002	Heilbronn, Germany	Challenger	Carpet (i)	(Germany) Alexander Popp	6–3, 3–6, 4–6
Loss	1–3	Jun 2002	Fürth, Germany	Challenger	Clay	(Peru) Luis Horna	4–6, 2–6
Loss	1–4	Jan 2003	Heilbronn, Germany	Challenger	Carpet (i)	(Slovakia) Karol Beck	2–6, 7–5, 6–7^{(5)}
Loss	1–5	Nov 2003	Aachen, Germany	Challenger	Carpet (i)	(Austria) Alexander Peya	6–7^{(2)}, 1–6
Win	2–5	Mar 2004	Boca Raton, United States	Challenger	Hard	(Sweden) Thomas Enqvist	6–3, 4–6, 6–3
Loss	2–6	Feb 2008	Wrocław, Poland	Challenger	Hard (i)	(Belgium) Kristof Vliegen	4–6, 6–3, 3–6
Win	3–6	Mar 2013	Dallas, United States	Challenger	Hard	(United States) Denis Kudla	6–4, 2–6, 6–1
Win	4–6	Feb 2017	Budapest, Hungary	Challenger	Hard (i)	(Hungary) Márton Fucsovics	7–6^{(6)}, 6–2
Win	5–6	Mar 2017	Wrocław, Poland	Challenger	Hard (i)	(Poland) Michał Przysiężny	6–4, 6–3

=== Doubles: 10 (6–4) ===
Legend ATP Challenger (6–2) ITF Futures (0–2)	Finals by surface Hard (3–2) Clay (3–2) Grass (0–0) Carpet (0–0)

Result	W–L	Date	Tournament	Tier	Surface	Partner	Opponents	Score
Loss	0–1	Jul 1999	Austria F3, Schwaz	Futures	Clay	(Austria) Alexander Peya	(Argentina) Daniel Caracciolo (Argentina) Fernando Las Heras	1–6, 7–6, 4–6
Loss	0–2	Aug 1999	Morocco F1, Tangier	Futures	Clay	(Austria) Philipp Müllner	(Australia) Tim Crichton (Australia) Todd Perry	3–6, 4–6
Win	1–2	Feb 2002	Andrézieux, France	Challenger	Hard (i)	(Austria) Julian Knowle	(North Macedonia) Aleksandar Kitinov (Australia) Todd Perry	6–4, 6–7^{(5)}, 6–1
Loss	1–3	Feb 2008	Wrocław, Poland	Challenger	Hard (i)	(Austria) Werner Eschauer	(United States) James Cerretani (Czech Republic) Lukáš Rosol	7–6^{(7)}, 3–6, [7–10]
Win	2–3	Aug 2008	Graz, Austria	Challenger	Clay	(Austria) Gerald Melzer	(France) Julien Jeanpierre (France) Nicolas Renavand	1–6, 7–6^{(8)}, [10–4]
Win	3–3	Mar 2013	Dallas, United States	Challenger	Hard	(Germany) Philipp Petzschner	(United States) Eric Butorac (United Kingdom) Dominic Inglot	6–3, 6–1
Win	4–3	Oct 2016	Mons, Belgium	Challenger	Hard (i)	(Austria) Julian Knowle	(Netherlands) Sander Arends (Netherlands) Wesley Koolhof	7–6^{(4)}, 7–6^{(4)}
Win	5–3	Apr 2017	Sarasota, United States	Challenger	Clay	(United States) Scott Lipsky	(United States) Stefan Kozlov (Canada) Peter Polansky	6–2, 6–4
Loss	5–4	Jan 2019	Koblenz, Germany	Challenger	Hard (i)	(Slovakia) Filip Polášek	(Czech Republic) Zdeněk Kolář (Czech Republic) Adam Pavlásek	3–6, 4–6
Win	6–4	May 2019	Aix-en-Provence, France	Challenger	Clay	(Germany) Kevin Krawietz	(Denmark) Frederik Nielsen (Germany) Tim Pütz	7–6^{(5)}, 6–2

== Record against top 10 players ==
Melzer's match record against those who have been ranked in the top 10, with those who have been No. 1 in boldface.

- (Croatia) Ivan Ljubičić 5–0
- (United States) Mardy Fish 4–1
- (Russia) **Marat Safin** 4–1
- (Spain) Tommy Robredo 4–4
- (Italy) Fabio Fognini 3–1
- (Belgium) David Goffin 3–2
- (United States) John Isner 3–2
- (Germany) Rainer Schüttler 3–2
- (Spain) Nicolás Almagro 3–3
- (Spain) **Juan Carlos Ferrero** 3–4
- (Spain) Fernando Verdasco 3–6
- (Croatia) Marin Čilić 3–7
- (Czech Republic) Radek Štěpánek 2–0
- (United States) **Andre Agassi** 2–1
- (Spain) Roberto Bautista Agut 2–1
- (Germany) Tommy Haas 2–1
- (Canada) Milos Raonic 2–1
- (France) Arnaud Clément 2–3
- (Chile) Fernando González 2–2
- (Ecuador) Nicolás Lapentti 2–2
- (Switzerland) Stanislas Wawrinka 2–2
- (France) Richard Gasquet 2–3
- (France) Gilles Simon 2–4
- (Czech Republic) Tomáš Berdych 2–5
- (Russia) Mikhail Youzhny 2–5
- (Spain) David Ferrer 2–7
- (Argentina) Gastón Gaudio 1–0
- (France) Sébastien Grosjean 1–0
- (South Africa) Wayne Ferreira 1–0
- (Germany) Alexander Zverev 1–0
- (Croatia) Mario Ančić 1–1
- (Cyprus) Marcos Baghdatis 1–1
- (Spain) Pablo Carreño Busta 1–1
- (United States) Todd Martin 1–1
- (Argentina) David Nalbandian 1–1
- (Argentina) Mariano Puerta 1–1
- (Austria) Dominic Thiem 1–1
- (Serbia) Janko Tipsarević 1–1
- (South Africa) Kevin Anderson 1–2
- (United Kingdom) Tim Henman 1–2
- (Chile) Nicolás Massú 1–2
- (United Kingdom) Greg Rusedski 1–2
- (Serbia) **Novak Djokovic** 1–3
- (Spain) **Rafael Nadal** 1–3
- (Japan) Kei Nishikori 1–3
- (Switzerland) **Roger Federer** 1–4
- (France) Gaël Monfils 1–4
- (Argentina) Juan Martín del Potro 1–5
- (Russia) Nikolay Davydenko 1–6
- (Argentina) Juan Mónaco 1–7
- (Germany) Nicolas Kiefer 1–8
- (Sweden) Jonas Björkman 0–1
- (United States) James Blake 0–1
- (Latvia) Ernests Gulbis 0–1
- (Spain) **Carlos Moyá** 0–1
- (Argentina) Diego Schwartzman 0–1
- (United States) Jack Sock 0–1
- (Thailand) Paradorn Srichaphan 0–1
- (Argentina) Guillermo Coria 0–2
- (Bulgaria) Grigor Dimitrov 0–2
- (Australia) Mark Philippoussis 0–2
- (Sweden) Robin Söderling 0–2
- (Argentina) Guillermo Cañas 0–3
- (Czech Republic) Jiří Novák 0–3
- (France) Jo-Wilfried Tsonga 0–6
- (Australia) **Lleyton Hewitt** 0–7
- (United Kingdom) **Andy Murray** 0–7
- (United States) **Andy Roddick** 0–10

== Wins over top 10 players ==
- He has a 13–60 (.178) record against players who were, at the time the match was played, ranked in the top 10.

Season	1999	2000	2001	2002	2003	2004	2005	2006	2007	2008	2009	2010	2011	2012	2013	2014	2015	2016	2017	2018	Total
Wins	0	0	0	1	0	1	1	1	0	1	1	5	1	0	0	0	0	1	0	0	13

#	Player	Rank	Event	Surface	Rd	Score	JM Rank
2002
1.	(Germany) Tommy Haas	2	Vienna, Austria	Hard (i)	2R	6–4, 6–3	95
2004
2.	(United Kingdom) Tim Henman	8	Miami, United States	Hard	2R	7–6^{(3)}, 2–6, 7–6^{(4)}	64
2005
3.	(United States) Andre Agassi	10	San Jose, United States	Hard (i)	QF	6–3, 6–1	36
2006
4.	(Spain) Tommy Robredo	7	Kitzbühel, Austria	Clay	2R	6–2, 7–5	81
2008
5.	(Switzerland) Stan Wawrinka	10	Beijing Olympics	Hard	2R	6–4, 6–0	51
2009
6.	(Argentina) Juan Martín del Potro	5	Shanghai, China	Hard	2R	7–5, 2–1 ret.	43
2010
7.	(Croatia) Marin Čilić	9	Dubai, United Arab Emirates	Hard	QF	7–6^{(8)}, 7–5	31
8.	(Spain) Fernando Verdasco	9	Madrid, Spain	Clay	3R	7–5, 6–3	30
9.	(Serbia) Novak Djokovic	3	French Open	Clay	QF	3–6, 2–6, 6–2, 7–6^{(3)}, 6–4	27
10.	(Spain) Rafael Nadal	1	Shanghai, China	Hard	3R	6–1, 3–6, 6–3	12
11.	(Spain) David Ferrer	7	Paris, France	Hard (i)	3R	7–6^{(6)}, 2–6, 6–3	12
2011
12.	(Switzerland) Roger Federer	3	Monte Carlo, Monaco	Clay	QF	6–4, 6–4	9
2016
13.	(Austria) Dominic Thiem	9	Kitzbühel, Austria	Clay	2R	6–3, 7–5	421

== Records ==
- These records were attained in the Open Era of tennis.

Tournament	Year	Record accomplished	Player/s tied
Grand Slam tournaments	2010	Defeated Novak Djokovic from two sets down	João Fonseca
