= Thomas Johansson =

Swedish tennis player (born 1975)

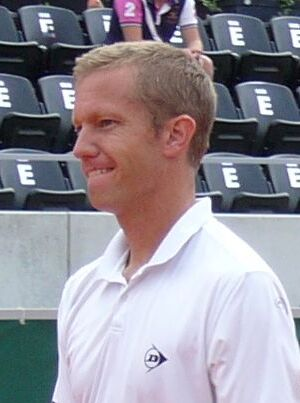
- Johansson in 2008
- Country (sports): Sweden
- Residence: Monte Carlo, Monaco
- Born: 24 March 1975 (age 51) Linköping, Sweden
- Height: 1.80 m (5 ft 11 in)
- Turned pro: 1994
- Retired: 2009
- Plays: Right-handed (two-handed backhand)
- Prize money: $7,168,029

Singles
- Career record: 357–296 (54.7%)
- Career titles: 9
- Highest ranking: No. 7 (10 June 2002)

Grand Slam singles results
- Australian Open: W (2002)
- French Open: 2R (1996, 2000, 2002, 2005)
- Wimbledon: SF (2005)
- US Open: QF (1998, 2000)

Other tournaments
- Tour Finals: RR (2002)
- Olympic Games: 2R (2008)

Doubles
- Career record: 76–98 (43.7%)
- Career titles: 1
- Highest ranking: No. 51 (17 July 2006)

Grand Slam doubles results
- Australian Open: 2R (2008)
- French Open: 2R (2006)
- Wimbledon: 3R (2007)
- US Open: 3R (2005)

Other doubles tournaments
- Olympic Games: F (2008)

Team competitions
- Davis Cup: W (1998)

Coaching career (2017–present)
- Maria Sakkari (2017–2018); Filip Krajinović (2018–2019); David Goffin (2016, 2019–2020); Sorana Cîrstea (2022–2024); Kei Nishikori (2024–2025); Daniil Medvedev (2025–2026)
Medal record
Olympic Games – Tennis
Representing Sweden
Silver medal – second place	2008 Beijing	Doubles
- Last updated on: 19 March 2023.

Karl Thomas Conny Johansson (pronounced [ˈtʊ̌mːas ˈjûːanˌsɔn]; born 24 March 1975) is a Swedish tennis coach and a former professional player. He reached a career-high Association of Tennis Professionals (ATP) world No. 7 singles ranking in May 2002. His career highlights in singles include a major title at the 2002 Australian Open, and a Masters title at the 1999 Canada Masters. He also won a silver medal at the 2008 Beijing Olympics in men's doubles, partnering Simon Aspelin. As of 2025, Johansson remains the last Swedish man to win a major in singles.

== Coaching career ==
Johansson was the coach of Sorana Cîrstea from 2022 to early 2024.

From early 2024 to September 2025, he was also the coach of Kei Nishikori.

He then coached Daniil Medvedev until July 2026.

== Tennis career ==
=== Juniors ===
Johansson began to play tennis at age five with his father, Krister. In 1989, became European 14s singles champion and won doubles title (with Magnus Norman). Even when he injured his right elbow while playing the Orange Bowl tennis championships 16s in 1991, he still reached the final, losing to Spain's Gonzalo Corrales. He finished No. 10 in the 1993 world junior rankings.

=== Professional career ===
That same year he joined the pro tour for the first time, and turned pro the following year. He has managed to win 9 top-level singles titles and 1 doubles title, including the 1999 Canada Masters, defeating world No. 4 Yevgeny Kafelnikov from a set down, and the 2002 Australian Open, which he unexpectedly won (while having never progressed beyond the quarterfinals of any of his 24 previous Grand Slams) after defeating Jacobo Díaz, Markus Hipfl, Younes El Aynaoui, Adrian Voinea, Jonas Björkman and Jiří Novák before defeating his heavily favored opponent in the final, Marat Safin, in four sets, again from a set down. "He was overpowering me from the baseline, backhand to backhand" said Safin afterwards. Johansson became the first Swedish player to win a Slam since Stefan Edberg won the 1992 US Open title, and the first Swede to claim the Australian Open since his idol Mats Wilander in 1988.

A knee injury robbed Johansson of the latter half of the 2002 season and all of 2003, and Johansson was therefore unable to compete until the start of 2004. Many people weren't sure if Johansson will be able to compete again because of the seriousness of the injury. In 2005, he made a comeback to become the first Swedish player to reach the semifinals at Wimbledon since Edberg in 1993, and only dropped a set en route, losing to 2nd seed Andy Roddick in a tightly contested four set match that lasted a minute under 3 hours. Near the end of the season, Johansson won his 9th and last ATP tour title in St. Petersburg, defeating Nicolas Kiefer in straight sets.

In 2006, the Swede struggled through the season after suffering an eye injury early in the season. The highlights of the season were a 4th round at the Australian Open (where he lost to Ivan Ljubičić), his first doubles title in Båstad, Sweden with countryman Jonas Björkman, and a final in St. Petersburg (lost to Mario Ančić), where he was the defending champion.

At the 2008 Beijing Summer Olympics he reached the doubles final with Simon Aspelin, where he lost against the Swiss team of Roger Federer and Stan Wawrinka in 4 sets. Johansson's final major appearance was the 2008 US Open, where he lost in the first round to Ernests Gulbis.

As of 6 March 2009, he has an 18–15 career Davis Cup record (17–12 in singles) in 17 ties, having played for Sweden every year other than 2003 (when he was out of action for the entire season) since 1998, and a 356–292 career overall.

He announced his retirement in June 2009 after a 15-year career.

== Personal life ==
His idol while growing up was Mats Wilander, who was the captain of Swedish Davis Cup team. He is also a keen player of golf and floorball, and a fan of ice hockey. He scored two goals and assisted on another in 6–5 win by ATP Stars over National Hockey League Players in an annual street hockey challenge in Montreal in 2001. He married Gisella Kaltenecker on 3 December 2005.

== Equipment ==
He is sponsored by Dunlop Sport for racquets and apparel, and Adidas for shoes. He uses a heavily modified Dunlop Pro Revelation racquet 'paintjobbed' to look like the current Dunlop 4D Aerogel 500 racquet.

== Significant finals ==
=== Grand Slam finals ===
==== Singles: 1 (1 title) ====
Result	Year	Championship	Surface	Opponent	Score
Win	2002	Australian Open	Hard	(Russia) Marat Safin	3–6, 6–4, 6–4, 7–6^{(7–4)}

=== ATP Masters Series finals ===
==== Singles: 1 (1 title) ====
Result	Year	Championship	Surface	Opponent	Score
Win	1999	Canada Masters	Hard	(Russia) Yevgeny Kafelnikov	1–6, 6–3, 6–3

== Olympics ==
=== Doubles: 1 (1 Silver) ===
Result	Year	Tournament	Surface	Partner	Opponents	Score
Silver	2008	Beijing Olympics	Hard	(Sweden) Simon Aspelin	(Switzerland) Roger Federer (Switzerland) Stan Wawrinka	3–6, 4–6, 7–6 ^{(7–4)}, 3–6

== ATP career finals ==
=== Singles: 14 (9 titles, 5 runner-ups) ===
Legend Grand Slam tournaments (1–0) ATP World Tour Finals (0–0) ATP World Tour Masters 1000 (1–0) ATP World Tour 500 Series (0–0) ATP World Tour 250 Series (7–5)	Finals by surface Hard (4–2) Clay (0–0) Grass (2–1) Carpet (3–2)

Result	W/L	Date	Tournament	Surface	Opponent	Score
Win	1–0	Mar 1997	Copenhagen, Denmark	Carpet (i)	(Czech Republic) Martin Damm	6–4, 3–6, 6–2
Win	2–0	Mar 1997	St. Petersburg, Russia	Carpet (i)	(Italy) Renzo Furlan	6–3, 6–4
Loss	2–1	Mar 1998	Rotterdam, Netherlands	Carpet (i)	(Netherlands) Jan Siemerink	6–7^{(2–7)}, 2–6
Loss	2–2	Nov 1998	Stockholm, Sweden	Hard (i)	(United States) Todd Martin	3–6, 4–6, 4–6
Win	3–2	Aug 1999	Montreal, Canada	Hard	(Russia) Yevgeny Kafelnikov	1–6, 6–3, 6–3
Win	4–2	Nov 2000	Stockholm, Sweden	Hard (i)	(Russia) Yevgeny Kafelnikov	6–2, 6–4, 6–4
Win	5–2	Jun 2001	Halle, Germany	Grass	(France) Fabrice Santoro	6–3, 6–7^{(5–7)}, 6–2
Win	6–2	Jun 2001	Nottingham, UK	Grass	(Israel) Harel Levy	7–5, 6–3
Win	7–2	Jan 2002	Australian Open, Australia	Hard	(Russia) Marat Safin	3–6, 6–4, 6–4, 7–6^{(7–4)}
Loss	7–3	Jun 2004	Nottingham, UK	Grass	(Thailand) Paradorn Srichaphan	6–1, 6–7^{(4–7)}, 3–6
Win	8–3	Oct 2004	Stockholm, Sweden	Hard (i)	(United States) Andre Agassi	3–6, 6–3, 7–6^{(7–4)}
Win	9–3	Oct 2005	St. Petersburg, Russia	Carpet (i)	(Germany) Nicolas Kiefer	6–4, 6–2
Loss	9–4	Oct 2006	St. Petersburg, Russia	Carpet (i)	(Croatia) Mario Ančić	5–7, 6–7^{(2–7)}
Loss	9–5	Oct 2007	Stockholm, Sweden	Hard (i)	(Croatia) Ivo Karlović	3–6, 6–3, 1–6

=== Doubles: 2 (1 title, 1 runner-up) ===
Legend Grand Slam tournaments (0–0) ATP World Tour Finals (0–0) ATP World Tour Masters 1000 (0–0) Summer Olympics (0–1) ATP World Tour 500 Series (0–0) ATP World Tour 250 Series (1–0)	Finals by surface Hard (0–1) Clay (1–0) Grass (0–0) Carpet (0–0)

Result	W/L	Date	Tournament	Surface	Partner	Opponents	Score
Win	1–0	Jul 2006	Båstad, Sweden	Clay	(Sweden) Jonas Björkman	(Germany) Christopher Kas (Austria) Oliver Marach	6–3, 4–6, [10–4]
Loss	1–1	Aug 2008	Summer Olympics, China	Hard	(Sweden) Simon Aspelin	(Switzerland) Roger Federer (Switzerland) Stanislas Wawrinka	3–6, 4–6, 7–6^{(7–4)}, 3–6

== ATP Challenger and ITF Futures finals ==
=== Singles: 4 (3–1) ===
Legend ATP Challenger (3–1) ITF Futures (0–0)	Finals by surface Hard (2–0) Clay (1–0) Grass (0–0) Carpet (0–1)

Result	W–L	Date	Tournament	Tier	Surface	Opponent	Score
Win	1–0	May 1995	Jerusalem, Israel	Challenger	Hard	(Germany) Patrick Baur	6–4, 7–6
Win	2–0	Sep 1995	Napoli, Italy	Challenger	Clay	(France) Frédéric Vitoux	6–0, 6–0
Loss	2–1	Feb 1996	Wolfsburg, Germany	Challenger	Carpet	(Italy) Gianluca Pozzi	6–4, 6–7, 6–7
Win	3–1	Aug 2007	Binghamton, United States	Challenger	Hard	(Serbia) Dušan Vemić	6–4, 7–6^{(9–7)}

=== Doubles: 3 (2–1) ===
Legend ATP Challenger (2–1) ITF Futures (0–0)	Finals by surface Hard (0–1) Clay (2–0) Grass (0–0) Carpet (0–0)

Result	W–L	Date	Tournament	Tier	Surface	Partner	Opponents	Score
Win	1–0	Jul 1995	Lillehammer, Norway	Challenger	Clay	(Sweden) Lars-Anders Wahlgren	(Australia) Andrew Ilie (Australia) Todd Larkham	3–6, 6–3, 6–3
Win	2–0	Jul 1995	Tampere, Finland	Challenger	Clay	(Sweden) Mårten Renström	(Portugal) Emanuel Couto (Portugal) Bernardo Mota	6–3, 6–3
Loss	2–1	Feb 2008	East London, South Africa	Challenger	Hard	(Austria) Stefan Koubek	(Sweden) Jonas Björkman (Zimbabwe) Kevin Ullyett	2–6, 2–6

== Performance timelines ==
=== Singles ===
Key
W	F	SF	QF	#R	RR	Q#	P#	DNQ	A	Z#	PO	G	S	B	NMS	NTI	P	NH

(W) winner; (F) finalist; (SF) semifinalist; (QF) quarterfinalist; (#R) rounds 4, 3, 2, 1; (RR) round-robin stage; (Q#) qualification round; (DNQ) did not qualify; (A) absent; (NH) not held; (SR) strike rate (events won / competed); (W–L) win–loss record.

Davis Cup matches are included in the statistics.

		Professional Career																	
Tournament	1993	1994	1995	1996	1997	1998	1999	2000	2001	2002	2003	2004	2005	2006	2007	2008	2009	SR	W–L
Grand Slam tournaments
Australian Open	A	1R	A	2R	2R	1R	1R	2R	3R	W	A	1R	4R	4R	2R	1R	A	1 / 13	19–12
French Open	A	Q1	1R	2R	1R	1R	A	2R	1R	2R	A	A	2R	1R	1R	1R	A	0 / 11	4–11
Wimbledon	A	A	A	4R	2R	3R	2R	4R	2R	1R	A	3R	SF	1R	1R	2R	A	0 / 12	19–12
US Open	A	Q2	A	2R	1R	QF	A	QF	4R	A	A	3R	2R	1R	3R	1R	A	0 / 10	17–10
Win–loss	0–0	0–1	0–1	6–4	2–4	6–4	1–2	9–4	6–4	8–2	0–0	4–3	10–4	3–4	3–4	1–4	0–0	1 / 46	59–45
Year-end championships
Tennis Masters Cup	Did not qualify									RR	Did not qualify							0 / 1	0–1
ATP World Tour Masters 1000
Indian Wells Masters	A	A	A	A	A	A	2R	2R	2R	1R	A	2R	2R	A	3R	2R	A	0 / 8	7–8
Miami Masters	A	A	A	A	A	A	2R	1R	4R	4R	A	1R	QF	A	2R	3R	Q1	0 / 8	10–8
Monte-Carlo Masters	A	A	A	A	1R	1R	1R	1R	1R	QF	A	A	1R	A	1R	A	A	0 / 8	3–8
Hamburg Masters	A	A	A	A	A	A	1R	1R	QF	2R	A	A	1R	1R	A	A	NMS	0 / 6	4–6
Rome Masters	A	A	A	A	2R	1R	1R	1R	1R	1R	A	A	2R	2R	A	A	A	0 / 8	3–8
Canada Masters	A	A	A	A	A	A	W	2R	2R	2R	A	SF	2R	3R	A	2R	A	1 / 8	17–7
Cincinnati Masters	A	A	A	A	2R	QF	1R	1R	1R	1R	A	2R	1R	1R	A	1R	A	0 / 10	5–10
Madrid Masters	Not Held									3R	A	A	3R	A	A	A	A	0 / 2	2–2
Stuttgart Masters	A	A	A	A	1R	3R	1R	2R	2R	Not Held								0 / 5	3–5
Paris Masters	A	A	A	A	2R	2R	1R	A	QF	3R	A	1R	3R	2R	Q2	A	A	0 / 8	7–8
Win–loss	0–0	0–0	0–0	0–0	3–5	6–5	7–8	3–8	9–9	9–9	0–0	6–5	7–9	4–5	3–3	4–4	0–0	1 / 71	61–70
Career statistics
Finals	0	0	0	0	2	2	1	1	2	1	0	2	1	1	1	0	0	14	
Titles	0	0	0	0	2	0	1	1	2	1	0	1	1	0	0	0	0	9	
Hardcourt Win–loss	0–0	0–1	0–1	13–10	15–13	24–13	16–13	17–17	26–16	17–12	0–0	19–13	19–14	5–7	19–14	10–12	0–0	200–156	
Clay Win–loss	0–0	0–1	0–1	4–5	1–6	2–6	1–7	1–5	4–5	7–7	0–0	1–2	8–6	1–6	4–5	3–7	0–0	37–69	
Grass Win–loss	0–0	0–0	0–0	4–2	1–3	4–3	1–1	3–3	11–1	2–2	0–0	6–3	10–3	0–3	0–3	2–3	0–0	46–30	
Carpet Win–loss	2–1	0–0	1–1	7–4	15–5	15–9	4–4	1–1	5–3	3–3	0–0	3–3	9–2	4–2	4–2	0–0	1–1	74–41	
Overall win–loss	2–1	0–2	1–3	28–21	32–27	45–31	22–25	22–26	46–25	29–24	0–0	29–21	48–25	10–18	27–24	15–22	1–1	357–296	
Win %	67%	0%	25%	57%	54%	59%	47%	46%	65%	55%	–	58%	66%	36%	53%	41%	50%	54.67%	
Year-end ranking	422	486	117	60	39	17	39	39	18	14	–	30	13	71	62	136	601		

=== Doubles ===
Tournament	1998	1999	2000	2001	2002	2003	2004	2005	2006	2007	2008	SR	W–L	Win%
Grand Slam tournaments
Australian Open	A	A	A	1R	A	A	A	A	A	1R	2R	0 / 3	1–3	25%
French Open	A	A	A	A	A	A	A	A	2R	1R	A	0 / 2	1–2	33%
Wimbledon	A	A	A	A	A	A	2R	A	A	3R	2R	0 / 3	4–3	57%
US Open	A	A	A	A	A	A	1R	3R	2R	2R	1R	0 / 5	4–5	44%
Win–loss	0–0	0–0	0–0	0–1	0–0	0–0	1–2	2–1	2–2	3–4	2–3	0 / 13	10–13	43%
Olympic Games
Summer Olympics	NH		A	Not Held			1R	Not Held			F	0 / 2	4–2	67%
ATP World Tour Masters 1000
Indian Wells	A	A	2R	A	1R	A	A	1R	A	A	A	0 / 3	1–3	25%
Miami	A	A	Q2	2R	A	A	A	1R	A	A	A	0 / 2	1–2	33%
Monte Carlo	1R	A	A	Q1	1R	A	1R	A	A	A	A	0 / 3	0–3	0%
Hamburg	A	A	A	A	2R	A	A	1R	1R	A	A	0 / 3	1–3	25%
Rome	A	2R	2R	1R	2R	A	A	1R	A	A	A	0 / 5	3–5	38%
Madrid	Not Held				A	A	A	2R	A	A	A	0 / 1	0–1	0%
Canada	A	Q2	Q2	1R	A	A	A	2R	A	A	A	0 / 2	1–2	33%
Cincinnati	A	A	2R	A	A	A	A	A	A	A	A	0 / 1	1–1	50%
Paris	A	A	A	A	A	A	A	SF	A	A	A	0 / 1	2–1	67%
Win–loss	0–1	1–1	3–3	1–3	2–4	0–0	0–1	3–7	0–1	0–0	0–0	0 / 21	10–21	32%

== Top 10 wins ==
Season	1993	1994	1995	1996	1997	1998	1999	2000	2001	2002	2003	2004	2005	2006	2007	2008	2009	Total
Wins	0	0	0	1	0	6	2	4	6	0	0	2	3	0	2	1	0	27

#	Player	Rank	Event	Surface	Rd	Score	JR
1996
1.	(Netherlands) Richard Krajicek	8	Singapore, Singapore	Carpet (i)	QF	5–7, 7–6^{(7–3)}, ret.	93
1998
2.	(Sweden) Jonas Björkman	4	Antwerp, Belgium	Hard (i)	1R	6–1, 6–2	40
3.	(Russia) Yevgeny Kafelnikov	4	Rotterdam, Netherlands	Carpet (i)	1R	7–6^{(7–5)}, 6–2	34
4.	(Spain) Carlos Moyá	5	Indianapolis, United States	Hard	2R	6–7^{(5–7)}, 6–0, 6–1	34
5.	(Netherlands) Richard Krajicek	5	US Open, New York, United States	Hard	3R	6–7^{(5–7)}, 5–4, ret.	33
6.	(Spain) Carlos Moyá	5	Davis Cup, Stockholm, Sweden	Carpet (i)	RR	7–5, 7–6^{(7–4)}, 7–6^{(8–6)}	22
7.	(Czech Republic) Petr Korda	10	Stuttgart, Germany	Hard (i)	2R	6–2, 6–4	21
1999
8.	(Russia) Yevgeny Kafelnikov	2	London, United Kingdom	Carpet (i)	QF	6–2, 7–6^{(7–5)}	19
9.	(Russia) Yevgeny Kafelnikov	4	Montreal, Canada	Hard	F	1–6, 6–3, 6–3	22
2000
10.	(Russia) Yevgeny Kafelnikov	5	Wimbledon, London, United Kingdom	Grass	2R	6–1, 7–6^{(7–0)}, 6–4	57
11.	(Sweden) Thomas Enqvist	9	Stockholm, Sweden	Hard (i)	1R	6–2, 6–2	57
12.	(Sweden) Magnus Norman	4	Stockholm, Sweden	Hard (i)	SF	7–6^{(7–4)}, 6–2	57
13.	(Russia) Yevgeny Kafelnikov	5	Stockholm, Sweden	Hard (i)	F	6–2, 6–4, 6–4	57
2001
14.	(Russia) Yevgeny Kafelnikov	7	Dubai, United Arab Emirates	Hard	2R	7–6^{(7–4)}, 7–5	31
15.	(Russia) Marat Safin	2	Indian Wells, United States	Hard	1R	7–5, 7–5	26
16.	(Brazil) Gustavo Kuerten	1	Miami, United States	Hard	3R	6–3, 4–6, 6–4	25
17.	(Russia) Yevgeny Kafelnikov	6	Davis Cup, Malmö, Sweden	Hard (i)	RR	6–4, 1–6, 7–6^{(12–10)}, 3–6, 6–2	25
18.	(Russia) Yevgeny Kafelnikov	7	Halle, Germany	Grass	SF	6–3, 5–7, 6–2	19
19.	(Australia) Pat Rafter	4	Davis Cup, Sydney, Australia	Hard	RR	3–6, 6–7^{(8–10)}, 6–3, 6–2, 6–3	17
2004
20.	(Argentina) Gastón Gaudio	10	US Open, New York, United States	Hard	2R	6–3, 2–6, 6–4, 6–4	61
21.	(United States) Andre Agassi	7	Stockholm, Sweden	Hard (i)	F	3–6, 6–3, 7–6^{(7–4)}	42
2005
22.	(Sweden) Joachim Johansson	9	Rotterdam, Netherlands	Hard (i)	2R	6–4, 6–4	29
23.	(Spain) Carlos Moyá	6	Miami, United States	Hard	3R	7–6^{(8–6)}, 3–6, 6–2	27
24.	(United Kingdom) Tim Henman	9	Queen's Club, London, United Kingdom	Grass	QF	6–4, 6–4	20
2007
25.	(United States) James Blake	7	Davis Cup, Gothenburg, Sweden	Carpet (i)	RR	6–4, 6–2, 3–6, 6–3	56
26.	(United States) James Blake	7	Stockholm, Sweden	Hard (i)	SF	3–6, 6–1, 7–6^{(7–3)}	55
2008
27.	(Spain) David Ferrer	5	Miami, United States	Hard	2R	6–4, 7–5	60

== See also ==
- List of Grand Slam men's singles champions
