= 2002 Wimbledon Championships – Girls' doubles =

Girls' doubles
- 2002 Wimbledon Championships

Final
- Champions: (Belgium) Elke Clijsters (Czech Republic) Barbora Strýcová
- Runners-up: (United States) Ally Baker (Germany) Anna-Lena Grönefeld
- Score: 6–4, 5–7, 8–6

Events
Singles	men	women		boys	girls
Doubles	men	women	mixed	boys	girls
WC Singles	men	women	quad
WC Doubles	men	women	quad
Legends	men	women	seniors
← 2001 ·	Wimbledon Championships	· 2003 →

Gisela Dulko and Ashley Harkleroad were the defending champions, but they did not compete in the Juniors this year.

Elke Clijsters and Barbora Strýcová defeated Ally Baker and Anna-Lena Grönefeld in the final, 6–4, 5–7, 8–6 to win the girls' doubles tennis title at the 2002 Wimbledon Championships.

== Seeds ==
1. (Belgium) Elke Clijsters / (Czech Republic) Barbora Strýcová (champions)
2. (United States) Ally Baker / (Germany) Anna-Lena Grönefeld (final)
3. (Netherlands) Silvana Bauer / (Netherlands) Elise Tamaëla (quarterfinals)
4. (Czech Republic) Eva Birnerová / (Czech Republic) Petra Cetkovská (first round)
5. (Slovakia) Jarmila Gajdošová / (Czech Republic) Andrea Hlaváčková (semifinals)
6. (Russia) Anna Bastrikova / (Russia) Vera Dushevina (quarterfinals)
7. (Georgia (country)) Salome Devidze / (Russia) Evgenia Linetskaya (withdrew)
8. (United States) Megan Falcon / (Chinese Taipei) Hsieh Su-wei (quarterfinals)

== Draw ==
=== Key ===
- Q = Qualifier
- WC = Wild card
- LL = Lucky loser
- Alt = Alternate
- SE = Special exempt
- PR = Protected ranking
- ITF = ITF entry
- JE = Junior exempt
- w/o = Walkover
- r = Retired
- d = Defaulted
- SR = Special ranking

=== Finals ===
Semifinals
1	(Belgium) Elke Clijsters (Czech Republic) Barbora Strýcová	6	6
5	(Slovakia) Jarmila Gajdošová (Czech Republic) Andrea Hlaváčková	4	3
(Italy) Romina Oprandi (Brazil) Marina Tavares	6^{1}	4
2	(United States) Ally Baker (Germany) Anna-Lena Grönefeld	7^{7}	6

Final
1	(Belgium) Elke Clijsters (Czech Republic) Barbora Strýcová	6	5	8
2	(United States) Ally Baker (Germany) Anna-Lena Grönefeld	4	7	6

=== Top half ===
First round
1	(Belgium) Elke Clijsters (Czech Republic) Barbora Strýcová	6	6
(United Kingdom) Katie O'Brien (United Kingdom) Melanie South	0	2
WC	(United Kingdom) Rebecca Rankin (Lithuania) Lina Stančiūtė	3	3
(South Africa) Kelly Anderson (Thailand) Pichaya Laosirichon	6	6
(Hungary) Zsuzsanna Babos (United States) Sunitha Rao	6	6
(Ecuador) Mariana Correa (United States) Tory Zawacki	2	2
(Japan) Yurika Sema (Japan) Shiho Tanaka	4	2
8	(United States) Megan Falcon (Chinese Taipei) Hsieh Su-wei	6	6
3	(Netherlands) Silvana Bauer (Netherlands) Elise Tamaëla	6	6
(United Kingdom) Alice Barnes (United Kingdom) Emily Webley-Smith	4	1
(Slovenia) Andreja Klepač (India) Sania Mirza	6	6^{4}	5
(Australia) Darya Ivanov (Australia) Tiffany Welford	3	7^{7}	7
(South Africa) Tarryn Terblanche (Netherlands) Dominique van Boekel
(Australia) Casey Dellacqua (Australia) Samantha Stosur	w/o
(United States) Carly Gullickson (United States) Jamea Jackson	2	6^{4}
5	(Slovakia) Jarmila Gajdošová (Czech Republic) Andrea Hlaváčková	6	7

Second round
1	(Belgium) E Clijsters (Czech Republic) B Strýcová	6	6
(South Africa) K Anderson (Thailand) P Laosirichon	1	1
(Hungary) Z Babos (United States) S Rao	3	6^{8}
8	(United States) M Falcon (Chinese Taipei) S-w Hsieh	6	7^{10}
3	(Netherlands) S Bauer (Netherlands) E Tamaëla	6	6
(Australia) D Ivanov (Australia) T Welford	2	2
(South Africa) T Terblanche (Netherlands) D van Boekel	w/o
5	(Slovakia) J Gajdošová (Czech Republic) A Hlaváčková

Quarterfinals
1	(Belgium) E Clijsters (Czech Republic) B Strýcová	7^{7}	6^{5}	6
8	(United States) M Falcon (Chinese Taipei) S-w Hsieh	6^{3}	7^{7}	4
3	(Netherlands) S Bauer (Netherlands) E Tamaëla	6^{5}	2
5	(Slovakia) J Gajdošová (Czech Republic) A Hlaváčková	7^{7}	6

Semifinals
1	(Belgium) E Clijsters (Czech Republic) B Strýcová	6	6
5	(Slovakia) J Gajdošová (Czech Republic) A Hlaváčková	4	3

=== Bottom half ===
First round
7	(Georgia (country)) Salome Devidze (Russia) Evgenia Linetskaya	w/o
(Italy) Romina Oprandi (Brazil) Marina Tavares
(Egypt) Amany Khalifa (Ukraine) Oxana Lyubtsova	1	3
(United States) Cory Ann Avants (United States) Shadisha Robinson	6	6
(Russia) Anastasia Sourkova (Russia) Marina Viliamovskaia	4	4
(Germany) Katja Blocker (Switzerland) Daniela Casanova	6	6
(United Kingdom) Francesca Flavell (United Kingdom) Anna Hawkins
4	(Czech Republic) Eva Birnerová (Czech Republic) Petra Cetkovská	w/o
6	(Russia) Anna Bastrikova (Russia) Vera Dushevina
(United States) Amber Liu (Lithuania) Aurelija Misevičiūtė	w/o
(Russia) Maria Kirilenko (Finland) Emma Laine	6	6
(United Kingdom) Hannah Grady (United States) Alexandra Mueller	3	3
(Federal Republic of Yugoslavia) Ana Ivanovic (Croatia) Nika Ožegović	2	2
(Uzbekistan) Ivanna Israilova (Belarus) Iryna Kuryanovich	6	6
(Czech Republic) Kristína Czafiková (Slovakia) Linda Smoleňáková	1	2
2	(United States) Ally Baker (Germany) Anna-Lena Grönefeld	6	6

Second round
(Italy) R Oprandi (Brazil) M Tavares
(United States) CA Avants (United States) S Robinson	w/o
(Germany) K Blocker (Switzerland) D Casanova	5^{r}
(United Kingdom) F Flavell (United Kingdom) A Hawkins	4
6	(Russia) A Bastrikova (Russia) V Dushevina	6	6
(Russia) M Kirilenko (Finland) E Laine	4	2
(Uzbekistan) I Israilova (Belarus) I Kuryanovich	2	2
2	(United States) A Baker (Germany) A-L Grönefeld	6	6

Quarterfinals
(Italy) R Oprandi (Brazil) M Tavares	7^{7}	6
(United Kingdom) F Flavell (United Kingdom) A Hawkins	6^{4}	3
6	(Russia) A Bastrikova (Russia) V Dushevina	4	6	3
2	(United States) A Baker (Germany) A-L Grönefeld	6	4	6

Semifinals
(Italy) R Oprandi (Brazil) M Tavares	6^{1}	4
2	(United States) A Baker (Germany) A-L Grönefeld	7^{7}	6
