= 2002 Wimbledon Championships – Girls' singles =

Girls' singles
- 2002 Wimbledon Championships

Final
- Champion: (Russia) Vera Dushevina
- Runner-up: (Russia) Maria Sharapova
- Score: 4–6, 6–1, 6–2

Details
- Draw: 64 (8 Q / 7 WC )
- Seeds: 16

Events
Singles	men	women		boys	girls
Doubles	men	women	mixed	boys	girls
WC Singles	men	women	quad
WC Doubles	men	women	quad
Legends	men	women	seniors
← 2001 ·	Wimbledon Championships	· 2003 →

Angelique Widjaja was the defending champion but did not complete in the Juniors this year.

Vera Dushevina defeated Maria Sharapova in the final, 4–6, 6–1, 6–2 to win the girls' singles tennis title at the 2002 Wimbledon Championships.

== Seeds ==
1. n/a
2. (Chinese Taipei) Hsieh Su-wei (first round)
3. (Czech Republic) Barbora Strýcová (second round)
4. (Czech Republic) Eva Birnerová (third round)
5. (Czech Republic) Petra Cetkovská (first round)
6. (Germany) Anna-Lena Grönefeld (second round)
7. (Russia) Maria Sharapova (final)
8. (Russia) Vera Dushevina (champion)
9. (Netherlands) Silvana Bauer (third round)
10. (Russia) Maria Kirilenko (semifinals)
11. (Slovenia) Andreja Klepač (second round)
12. (Russia) Anna Bastrikova (quarterfinals)
13. (Australia) Samantha Stosur (first round, retired)
14. (United States) Ally Baker (third round)
15. (United States) Cory Ann Avants (quarterfinals)
16. (France) Tatiana Golovin (semifinals)

Click on the seed number of a player to go to their draw section.

== Draw ==
=== Key ===
- Q = Qualifier
- WC = Wild card
- LL = Lucky loser
- Alt = Alternate
- SE = Special exempt
- PR = Protected ranking
- ITF = ITF entry
- JE = Junior exempt
- w/o = Walkover
- r = Retired
- d = Defaulted
- SR = Special ranking

=== Finals ===
Quarterfinals
16	(France) Tatiana Golovin	6	7^{10}
12	(Russia) Anna Bastrikova	2	6^{8}
(Russia) Evgenia Linetskaya	1	6	1
8	(Russia) Vera Dushevina	6	4	6
7	(Russia) Maria Sharapova	6	6
15	(United States) Cory Ann Avants	0	2
10	(Russia) Maria Kirilenko	6	6
(Slovakia) Linda Smoleňáková	4	4

Semifinals
16	(France) Tatiana Golovin	3	1
8	(Russia) Vera Dushevina	6	6
7	(Russia) Maria Sharapova	6	3	6
10	(Russia) Maria Kirilenko	0	6	3

Final
8	(Russia) Vera Dushevina	4	6	6
7	(Russia) Maria Sharapova	6	1	2

=== Top half ===
==== Section 1 ====
First round
LL	(Brazil) Marina Tavares	2	2
(United States) Amber Liu	6	6
(South Africa) Kelly Anderson	2	3
(Switzerland) Daniela Casanova	6	6
(Belgium) Elke Clijsters	7^{7}	1	0
WC	(United Kingdom) Anna Hawkins	6^{5}	6	6
(India) Sania Mirza	4	1
16	(France) Tatiana Golovin	6	6
12	(Russia) Anna Bastrikova	6	6
WC	(United Kingdom) Melanie South	1	2
Q	(Japan) Shiho Tanaka	6	6
(Lithuania) Aurelija Misevičiūtė	2	3
(Uzbekistan) Ivanna Israilova	3	6	6
WC	(United States) Alexandra Mueller	6	4	3
(Czech Republic) Andrea Hlaváčková	5	3
6	(Germany) Anna-Lena Grönefeld	7	6

Second round
(United States) A Liu	2	6	2
(Switzerland) D Casanova	6	4	6
WC	(United Kingdom) A Hawkins	2	1
16	(France) T Golovin	6	6
12	(Russia) A Bastrikova	6	6
Q	(Japan) S Tanaka	3	0
(Uzbekistan) I Israilova	7^{7}	4	6
6	(Germany) A-L Grönefeld	6^{4}	6	1

Third round
(Switzerland) D Casanova	0	2
16	(France) T Golovin	6	6
12	(Russia) A Bastrikova	6	6
(Uzbekistan) I Israilova	4	2

Quarterfinals
16	(France) T Golovin	6	7^{10}
12	(Russia) A Bastrikova	2	6^{8}

==== Section 2 ====
First round
3	(Czech Republic) Barbora Strýcová	6	5	6
(Hungary) Zsuzsanna Babos	3	7	0
Q	(Belarus) Iryna Kuryanovich	1	6^{5}
(Russia) Evgenia Linetskaya	6	7^{7}
Q	(United Kingdom) Rebecca Rankin	6^{3}	3
Q	(Australia) Tiffany Welford	7^{7}	6
(Ukraine) Oxana Lyubtsova	5	3
14	(United States) Ally Baker	7	6
11	(Slovenia) Andreja Klepač	7^{7}	6
(Ecuador) Mariana Correa	6^{5}	1
(Slovakia) Kristína Czafiková	2	6	8
WC	(United Kingdom) Hannah Grady	6	3	6
(Netherlands) Elise Tamaëla	6^{5}	7^{7}	6
Q	(Japan) Yurika Sema	7^{7}	6^{3}	8
(United States) Sunitha Rao	3	4
8	(Russia) Vera Dushevina	6	6

Second round
3	(Czech Republic) B Strýcová	3	4
(Russia) E Linetskaya	6	6
Q	(Australia) T Welford	1	6	1
14	(United States) A Baker	6	4	6
11	(Slovenia) A Klepač	3	3
(Slovakia) K Czafiková	6	6
Q	(Japan) Y Sema	2	2
8	(Russia) V Dushevina	6	6

Third round
(Russia) E Linetskaya	6	6
14	(United States) A Baker	3	4
(Slovakia) K Czafiková	2	3
8	(Russia) V Dushevina	6	6

Quarterfinals
(Russia) E Linetskaya	1	6	1
8	(Russia) V Dushevina	6	4	6

=== Bottom half ===
==== Section 3 ====
First round
7	(Russia) Maria Sharapova	3	6	6
(Slovakia) Jarmila Gajdošová	6	2	2
(Egypt) Amany Khalifa	4	4
WC	(United Kingdom) Katie O'Brien	6	6
LL	(Australia) Darya Ivanov	5	6	4
(United States) Jamea Jackson	7	4	6
Q	(South Africa) Tarryn Terblanche	2	1
9	(Netherlands) Silvana Bauer	6	6
15	(United States) Cory Ann Avants	7	6
LL	(Russia) Marina Viliamovskaia	5	0
WC	(United Kingdom) Emily Webley-Smith	6	6
(Thailand) Pichaya Laosirichon	2	2
(Hungary) Petra Teller	2	7^{9}	6
(Germany) Katja Blocker	6	6^{7}	8
Q	(Finland) Emma Laine	5	6	7
4	(Czech Republic) Eva Birnerová	7	1	9

Second round
7	(Russia) M Sharapova	6	6
WC	(United Kingdom) K O'Brien	1	1
(United States) J Jackson	6^{4}	3
9	(Netherlands) S Bauer	7^{7}	6
15	(United States) CA Avants	6	6
WC	(United Kingdom) E Webley-Smith	3	0
(Germany) K Blocker	4	2
4	(Czech Republic) E Birnerová	6	6

Third round
7	(Russia) M Sharapova	7	6
9	(Netherlands) S Bauer	5	3
15	(United States) CA Avants	4	6	6
4	(Czech Republic) E Birnerová	6	4	3

Quarterfinals
7	(Russia) M Sharapova	6	6
15	(United States) CA Avants	0	2

==== Section 4 ====
First round
5	(Czech Republic) Petra Cetkovská	2	7	1
(United States) Carly Gullickson	6	5	6
(United States) Tory Zawacki	6	1	6
WC	(United Kingdom) Francesca Flavell	2	6	2
(Federal Republic of Yugoslavia) Ana Ivanovic	6	6^{3}	3
(Croatia) Nika Ožegović	3	7^{7}	6
(Georgia (country)) Salome Devidze	3	0
10	(Russia) Maria Kirilenko	6	6
13	(Australia) Samantha Stosur	3	3^{r}
(Italy) Romina Oprandi	6	4
(Poland) Marta Domachowska	4	1
(Slovakia) Linda Smoleňáková	6	6
(United States) Shadisha Robinson	6	6
(Russia) Anastasia Sourkova	1	4
Q	(United Kingdom) Alice Barnes	6	6
2	(Chinese Taipei) Hsieh Su-wei	4	3

Second round
(United States) C Gullickson	7^{9}	6
(United States) T Zawacki	6^{7}	0
(Croatia) N Ožegović	2	2
10	(Russia) M Kirilenko	6	6
(Italy) R Oprandi	0	4
(Slovakia) L Smoleňáková	6	6
(United States) S Robinson	1	3
Q	(United Kingdom) A Barnes	6	6

Third round
(United States) C Gullickson	6	4	3
10	(Russia) M Kirilenko	3	6	6
(Slovakia) L Smoleňáková	7^{11}	7
Q	(United Kingdom) A Barnes	6^{9}	5

Quarterfinals
10	(Russia) M Kirilenko	6	6
(Slovakia) L Smoleňáková	4	4
