= 2002 Wimbledon Championships – Boys' doubles =

Boys' doubles
- 2002 Wimbledon Championships

Final
- Champions: (Romania) Florin Mergea (Romania) Horia Tecău
- Runners-up: (United States) Brian Baker (United States) Rajeev Ram
- Score: 6–4, 4–6, 6–4

Events
Singles	men	women		boys	girls
Doubles	men	women	mixed	boys	girls
WC Singles	men	women	quad
WC Doubles	men	women	quad
Legends	men	women	seniors
- Wimbledon Championships

Frank Dancevic and Giovanni Lapentti were the defending champions, but they did not compete in the Juniors this year.

Florin Mergea and Horia Tecău defeated Brian Baker and Rajeev Ram in the final, 6–4, 4–6, 6–4 to win the boys' doubles tennis title at the 2002 Wimbledon Championships.

== Seeds ==
1. (Germany) Markus Bayer / (Germany) Philipp Petzschner (quarterfinals)
2. (Australia) Ryan Henry / (Australia) Todd Reid (quarterfinals)
3. (Australia) Adam Feeney / (Australia) Chris Guccione (first round)
4. (Netherlands) Michel Koning / (Netherlands) Bas van der Valk (second round)
5. (Uruguay) Marcel Felder / (Uruguay) Martín Vilarrubí (second round)
6. (Ecuador) Martin Stiegwardt / (South Africa) Christopher Westerhof (second round)
7. (Czech Republic) Tomáš Berdych / (Belgium) Steve Darcis (second round, retired)
8. (United States) Stephen Amritraj / (Algeria) Lamine Ouahab (quarterfinals)

== Draw ==
Key

- Q = Qualifier
- WC = Wild card
- LL = Lucky loser
- Alt = Alternate
- ITF = ITF entry
- PR = Protected ranking
- SR = Special ranking
- SE = Special exempt
- JE = Junior exempt
- JR = Junior Accelerator Programme entrant
- CO = College Accelerator Programme entrant
- NG = Next Gen Accelerator Program entrant
- w/o = Walkover
- r = Retired
- d = Defaulted

=== Finals ===
Semifinals
(Romania) Florin Mergea (Romania) Horia Tecău	6	7^{7}
(Australia) Robert Haybittel (Australia) Robert Smeets	1	6^{2}
(United States) Brian Baker (United States) Rajeev Ram	6	6
(United Kingdom) Robert Searle (United Kingdom) Matthew Smith	4	4

Final
(Romania) Florin Mergea (Romania) Horia Tecău	6	4	6
(United States) Brian Baker (United States) Rajeev Ram	4	6	4

=== Top half ===
First round
1	(Germany) Markus Bayer (Germany) Philipp Petzschner	6	7^{7}
(United Kingdom) Tom Burn (United Kingdom) Mat Lowe	4	6^{2}
(United Kingdom) David Brewer (United Kingdom) Andy Murray	6^{5}	6	6
(Thailand) Sratha Saengsuwarn (Japan) Shunsuke Shimizu	7^{7}	4	1
(Bulgaria) Yordan Kanev (Togo) Komlavi Loglo	7^{7}	4	6
(Romania) Florin Mergea (Romania) Horia Tecău	6^{4}	6	8
(United States) Josh Cohen (Croatia) Davor Kušeta	w/o
7	(Czech Republic) Tomáš Berdych (Belgium) Steve Darcis
4	(Netherlands) Michel Koning (Netherlands) Bas van der Valk	7^{8}	6
(United Kingdom) Alex Bogdanovic (United Kingdom) Bojan Jelovac	6^{6}	4
(Mexico) Antonio Ruiz-Rosales (Belarus) Alexander Skrypko	4	3
(Australia) Robert Haybittel (Australia) Robert Smeets	6	6
(Australia) Raphael Durek (Russia) Teymuraz Gabashvili	6^{5}	6	8
(Jamaica) Dustin Brown (Bolivia) Alberto Sottocorno	7^{7}	3	6
(United Kingdom) Josh Goodall (United Kingdom) Alexander Miotto	3	4
8	(United States) Stephen Amritraj (Algeria) Lamine Ouahab	6	6

Second round
(Germany) M Bayer (Germany) P Petzschner	6	6
(United Kingdom) D Brewer (United Kingdom) A Murray	4	4
(Romania) F Mergea (Romania) H Tecău	6^{5}	6	0
7	(Czech Republic) T Berdych (Belgium) S Darcis	7^{7}	4	0^{r}
4	(Netherlands) M Koning (Netherlands) B van der Valk	3	7^{7}	6
(Australia) R Haybittel (Australia) R Smeets	6	6^{2}	8
(Australia) R Durek (Russia) T Gabashvili	1	4
(United States) S Amritraj (Algeria) L Ouahab	6	6

Quarterfinals
(Germany) M Bayer (Germany) P Petzschner	3	6^{6}
(Romania) F Mergea (Romania) H Tecău	6	7^{8}
(Australia) R Haybittel (Australia) R Smeets	5	6	11
(United States) S Amritraj (Algeria) L Ouahab	7	3	9

Semifinals
(Romania) F Mergea (Romania) H Tecău	6	7^{7}
(Australia) R Haybittel (Australia) R Smeets	1	6^{2}

=== Bottom half ===
First round
5	(Uruguay) Marcel Felder (Uruguay) Martín Vilarrubí	6	3	6
(United Kingdom) Nick Crawley (United Kingdom) Craig Evans	1	6	2
(United Kingdom) Ross Hutchins (United Kingdom) Guy Thomas	5	6^{5}
(United States) Brian Baker (United States) Rajeev Ram	7	7^{7}
(United States) Chris Kwon (Sweden) Michael Ryderstedt
(Slovenia) Anže Kapun (Czech Republic) Daniel Lustig	w/o
(Chinese Taipei) Liu Tai-wei (Japan) Go Soeda	6	6
3	(Australia) Adam Feeney (Australia) Chris Guccione	3	4
6	(Ecuador) Martin Stiegwardt (South Africa) Christopher Westerhof	6	7^{7}
(Hong Kong) Brian Hung (Hong Kong) Yu Hui-tung	3	6^{2}
(United Kingdom) Robert Searle (United Kingdom) Matthew Smith	6	6
(Brazil) Alexandre Bonatto (Brazil) Franco Ferreiro	3	3
(Switzerland) Benjamin-David Rufer (Russia) Artem Sitak
(Hungary) György Balázs (Poland) Michał Przysiężny	w/o
(Latvia) Andis Juška (United States) Robert Yim	3	3
2	(Australia) Ryan Henry (Australia) Todd Reid	6	6

Second round
(Uruguay) M Felder (Uruguay) M Vilarrubí	3	2
(United States) B Baker (United States) R Ram	6	6
(United States) C Kwon (Sweden) M Ryderstedt	6	3	6
(Chinese Taipei) T-w Liu (Japan) G Soeda	4	6	8
6	(Ecuador) M Stiegwardt (South Africa) C Westerhof	5	2
(United Kingdom) R Searle (United Kingdom) M Smith	7	6
(Switzerland) B-D Rufer (Russia) A Sitak	w/o
(Australia) R Henry (Australia) T Reid

Quarterfinals
(United States) B Baker (United States) R Ram	7	6
(Chinese Taipei) T-w Liu (Japan) G Soeda	5	2
(United Kingdom) R Searle (United Kingdom) M Smith	6	6
(Australia) R Henry (Australia) T Reid	3	4

Semifinals
(United States) B Baker (United States) R Ram	6	6
(United Kingdom) R Searle (United Kingdom) M Smith	4	4
