= 2002 Wimbledon Championships – Women's singles =

Women's singles
- 2002 Wimbledon Championships

Final
- Champion: (United States) Serena Williams
- Runner-up: (United States) Venus Williams
- Score: 7–6^{(7–4)}, 6–3

Details
- Draw: 128 (12 Q / 8 WC )
- Seeds: 32

Events
Singles	men	women		boys	girls
Doubles	men	women	mixed	boys	girls
WC Singles	men	women	quad
WC Doubles	men	women	quad
Legends	men	women	seniors
← 2001 ·	Wimbledon Championships	· 2003 →

Serena Williams defeated the two-time defending champion, her sister Venus Williams, in the final, 7–6^{(7–4)}, 6–3 to win the ladies' singles tennis title at the 2002 Wimbledon Championships. It was her first Wimbledon singles title, third major singles title overall, and the second component of her first "Serena Slam," a non-calendar year Grand Slam. Serena did not lose a set during the tournament. She claimed the world No. 1 singles ranking for the first time by winning the tournament. She achieved the 'Channel Slam' (winning the French Open and Wimbledon in the same year), the first time the feat was achieved since Steffi Graf in 1996.

== Seeds ==
1. (United States) Venus Williams (final)
2. (United States) Serena Williams (champion)
3. (United States) Jennifer Capriati (quarterfinals)
4. (United States) Monica Seles (quarterfinals)
5. (Belgium) Kim Clijsters (second round)
6. (Belgium) Justine Henin (semifinals)
7. (Federal Republic of Yugoslavia) Jelena Dokic (fourth round)
8. (France) Sandrine Testud (second round)
9. (France) Amélie Mauresmo (semifinals)
10. (Italy) Silvia Farina Elia (third round)
11. (Slovakia) Daniela Hantuchová (quarterfinals)
12. (Russia) Elena Dementieva (fourth round)
13. (United States) Meghann Shaughnessy (second round)
14. (Uzbekistan) Iroda Tulyaganova (second round)
15. (Israel) Anna Smashnova (first round)
16. (United States) Lisa Raymond (fourth round)

17. (Switzerland) Patty Schnyder (second round)
18. (Russia) Anastasia Myskina (third round)
19. (Bulgaria) Magdalena Maleeva (fourth round)
20. (Thailand) Tamarine Tanasugarn (fourth round)
21. (Russia) Tatiana Panova (third round)
22. (Luxembourg) Anne Kremer (second round)
23. (Croatia) Iva Majoli (third round)
24. (United States) Alexandra Stevenson (first round)
25. (France) Nathalie Dechy (third round)
26. (Czech Republic) Dája Bedáňová (third round)
27. (Japan) Ai Sugiyama (third round)
28. (Argentina) Paola Suárez (first round)
29. (Austria) Barbara Schett (second round)
30. (Argentina) Clarisa Fernández (second round)
31. (Australia) Nicole Pratt (first round)
32. (South Africa) Amanda Coetzer (second round)

Click on the seed number of a player to go to their draw section.

== Draw ==
=== Key ===
- Q = Qualifier
- WC = Wild card
- LL = Lucky loser
- Alt = Alternate
- ITF = ITF entry
- PR = Protected ranking
- SR = Special ranking
- SE = Special exempt
- JE = Junior exempt
- JR = Junior Accelerator Programme entrant
- CO = College Accelerator Programme entrant
- NG = Next Gen Accelerator Program entrant
- w/o = Walkover
- r = Retired
- d = Defaulted

=== Finals ===
Quarterfinals
1	(United States) Venus Williams	6	6
(Russia) Elena Likhovtseva	2	0
4	(United States) Monica Seles	5	6^{4}
6	(Belgium) Justine Henin	7	7^{7}
9	(France) Amélie Mauresmo	6	6
3	(United States) Jennifer Capriati	3	2
11	(Slovakia) Daniela Hantuchová	3	2
2	(United States) Serena Williams	6	6

Semifinals
1	(United States) Venus Williams	6	6
6	(Belgium) Justine Henin	3	2
9	(France) Amélie Mauresmo	2	1
2	(United States) Serena Williams	6	6

Final
1	(United States) Venus Williams	6^{4}	3
2	(United States) Serena Williams	7^{7}	6

=== Top half ===
==== Section 1 ====
First round
1	(United States) V Williams	6	6
WC	(United Kingdom) J O'Donoghue	1	1
(Germany) A Rösch	2	4
(Spain) V Ruano Pascual	6	6
(Canada) M Drake	6	6
(Switzerland) M-G Mikaelian	3	3
(United States) J Craybas	6	5	7
28	(Argentina) P Suárez	4	7	5
17	(Switzerland) P Schnyder	3	7^{7}	7
Q	(Ukraine) T Perebiynis	6	6^{3}	5
(France) C Beigbeder	1	0
(Spain) C Martínez	6	6
(Indonesia) W Prakusya	6	6
(Canada) J Nejedly	0	2
(Slovenia) K Srebotnik	4	2
16	(United States) L Raymond	6	6

Second round
1	(United States) V Williams	6	6
(Spain) V Ruano Pascual	3	1
(Canada) M Drake	6	6
(United States) J Craybas	2	2
17	(Switzerland) P Schnyder	1	3
(Spain) C Martínez	6	6
(Indonesia) W Prakusya	4	6	1
16	(United States) L Raymond	6	2	6

Third round
1	(United States) V Williams	5	6	6
(Canada) M Drake	7	2	1
(Spain) C Martínez	6	3	2
16	(United States) L Raymond	2	6	6

Fourth round
1	(United States) V Williams	6	6
16	(United States) L Raymond	1	2

==== Section 2 ====
First round
10	(Italy) S Farina Elia	7	4	6
(United States) A Frazier	5	6	4
(United States) J Hopkins	0	7	3
(Germany) B Rittner	6	5	6
WC	(United Kingdom) H Collin	1	7^{7}	2
(Switzerland) E Gagliardi	6	6^{1}	6
WC	(United Kingdom) R Viollet	1	0
19	(Bulgaria) M Maleeva	6	6
32	(South Africa) A Coetzer	6	6
(Hungary) Z Gubacsi	3	2
Q	(Venezuela) M Vento-Kabchi	4	4
WC	(United Kingdom) E Baltacha	6	6
Q	(Italy) R Vinci	3	2
(Russia) E Likhovtseva	6	6
(United States) S Reeves	2	6^{5}
5	(Belgium) K Clijsters	6	7^{7}

Second round
10	(Italy) S Farina Elia	6	6
(Germany) B Rittner	3	2
(Switzerland) E Gagliardi	4	3
19	(Bulgaria) M Maleeva	6	6
32	(South Africa) A Coetzer	7	4	2
WC	(United Kingdom) E Baltacha	5	6	6
(Russia) E Likhovtseva	7^{7}	6
5	(Belgium) K Clijsters	6^{5}	2

Third round
10	(Italy) S Farina Elia	6^{2}	4
19	(Bulgaria) M Maleeva	7^{7}	6
WC	(United Kingdom) E Baltacha	4	6^{2}
(Russia) E Likhovtseva	6	7^{7}

Fourth round
19	(Bulgaria) M Maleeva	3	4
(Russia) E Likhovtseva	6	6

==== Section 3 ====
First round
4	(United States) M Seles	6	6
(Spain) E Bes	0	0
(Czech Republic) A Gerši	3	5
(Paraguay) R Neffa-de los Ríos	6	7
(France) V Razzano	6	7^{7}
WC	(United Kingdom) A Keothavong	3	6^{5}
Q	(Czech Republic) Z Ondrášková	1	2
27	(Japan) A Sugiyama	6	6
20	(Thailand) T Tanasugarn	5	6	6
Q	(Spain) M Sánchez Lorenzo	7	4	4
(Italy) T Garbin	6^{4}	3
(Germany) J Kandarr	7^{7}	6
(United States) M Irvin	6^{0}	2
(United States) M Tu	7^{7}	6
(Indonesia) A Widjaja	6	6
15	(Israel) A Smashnova	3	2

Second round
4	(United States) M Seles	6	6
(Paraguay) R Neffa-de los Ríos	4	0
(France) V Razzano	2	1
27	(Japan) A Sugiyama	6	6
20	(Thailand) T Tanasugarn	6	6
(Germany) J Kandarr	3	4
(United States) M Tu	7^{7}	7
(Indonesia) A Widjaja	6^{2}	5

Third round
4	(United States) M Seles	4	6	6
27	(Japan) A Sugiyama	6	1	4
20	(Thailand) T Tanasugarn	6	3	6
(United States) M Tu	2	6	0

Fourth round
4	(United States) M Seles	6	6
20	(Thailand) T Tanasugarn	2	2

==== Section 4 ====
First round
12	(Russia) E Dementieva	6	6
(Germany) B Lamade	4	3
(Chinese Taipei) J Lee	4	4
(France) É Loit	6	6
(Russia) V Zvonareva	6	6
Q	(Italy) An Serra Zanetti	3	2
(Slovenia) T Pisnik	3	4
23	(Croatia) I Majoli	6	6
29	(Austria) B Schett	6	6
(Zimbabwe) C Black	2	2
Q	(Switzerland) M Casanova	7	6
(Slovakia) H Nagyová	5	4
(Germany) M Müller	3	5
(Czech Republic) D Chládková	6	7
PR	(United States) B Rippner	2	7^{7}	1
6	(Belgium) J Henin	6	6^{4}	6

Second round
12	(Russia) E Dementieva	6	7
(France) É Loit	1	5
(Russia) V Zvonareva	6^{5}	2
23	(Croatia) I Majoli	7^{7}	6
29	(Austria) B Schett	3	6	3
Q	(Switzerland) M Casanova	6	3	6
(Czech Republic) D Chládková	2	5
6	(Belgium) J Henin	6	7

Third round
12	(Russia) E Dementieva	7	6
23	(Croatia) I Majoli	5	2
Q	(Switzerland) M Casanova	4	4
6	(Belgium) J Henin	6	6

Fourth round
12	(Russia) E Dementieva	6^{4}	6^{5}
6	(Belgium) J Henin	7^{7}	7^{7}

=== Bottom half ===
==== Section 5 ====
First round
8	(France) S Testud	6^{3}	6	6
(Germany) A Barna	7^{7}	4	1
(Australia) A Molik	4	6	6
PR	(France) M Pierce	6	4	8
WC	(Belarus) N Zvereva	6	3	2
(Germany) M Weingärtner	4	6	6
Q	(United States) L Granville	7	7
31	(Australia) N Pratt	5	5
18	(Russia) A Myskina	2	6	7
(Denmark) E Dyrberg	6	1	5
(Germany) G Arn	6	6
(Kazakhstan) I Selyutina	4	3
(Spain) M Serna	1	3
(Italy) R Grande	6	6
Q	(Czech Republic) I Benešová	1	7^{7}	2
9	(France) A Mauresmo	6	6^{0}	6

Second round
8	(France) S Testud	3	4
PR	(France) M Pierce	6	6
(Germany) M Weingärtner	3	4
Q	(United States) L Granville	6	6
18	(Russia) A Myskina	6	6
(Germany) G Arn	4	3
(Italy) R Grande	4	2
9	(France) A Mauresmo	6	6

Third round
PR	(France) M Pierce	6	4	1
Q	(United States) L Granville	3	6	6
18	(Russia) A Myskina	4	2
9	(France) A Mauresmo	6	6

Fourth round
Q	(United States) L Granville	2	2
9	(France) A Mauresmo	6	6

==== Section 6 ====
First round
13	(United States) M Shaughnessy	6	6
WC	(United Kingdom) L Ahl	2	2
(Netherlands) M Oremans	6	6
Q	(France) A Fusai	3	4
(Croatia) J Kostanić	2	3
(Greece) E Daniilidou	6	6
(Japan) S Obata	6	6
24	(United States) A Stevenson	1	3
26	(Czech Republic) D Bedáňová	6	6
(Netherlands) S Noorlander	1	2
(Tunisia) S Sfar	6	6
(United States) K Brandi	3	3
(Russia) A Jidkova	0	6^{5}
(Spain) M Marrero	6	7^{7}
(Slovakia) J Husárová	1	4
3	(United States) J Capriati	6	6

Second round
13	(United States) M Shaughnessy	5	3
(Netherlands) M Oremans	7	6
(Greece) E Daniilidou	6	6
(Japan) S Obata	2	2
26	(Czech Republic) D Bedáňová	6	6
(Tunisia) S Sfar	3	2
(Spain) M Marrero	2	1
3	(United States) J Capriati	6	6

Third round
(Netherlands) M Oremans	6^{5}	4
(Greece) E Daniilidou	7^{7}	6
26	(Czech Republic) D Bedáňová	4	2
3	(United States) J Capriati	6	6

Fourth round
(Greece) E Daniilidou	1	6	1
3	(United States) J Capriati	6	3	6

==== Section 7 ====
First round
7	(Federal Republic of Yugoslavia) J Dokic	7^{7}	6
Q	(Ukraine) E Tatarkova	6^{4}	4
(Czech Republic) K Hrdličková	3	6	6
(France) S Foretz	6	4	3
(Belarus) T Poutchek	6	6
(Spain) Á Montolio	4	3
(Argentina) M Díaz Oliva	2	3
25	(France) N Dechy	6	6
22	(Luxembourg) A Kremer	6	6
(Spain) G León García	4	4
(Slovenia) M Matevžič	6^{4}	6	6
WC	(United Kingdom) J Pullin	7^{7}	1	4
(Slovakia) M Suchá	6	6
(United States) L Osterloh	2	1
(Spain) C Torrens Valero	3	2
11	(Slovakia) D Hantuchová	6	6

Second round
7	(Federal Republic of Yugoslavia) J Dokic	6	4	8
(Czech Republic) K Hrdličková	0	6	6
(Belarus) T Poutchek	3	2
25	(France) N Dechy	6	6
22	(Luxembourg) A Kremer	6	1	2
(Slovenia) M Matevžič	2	6	6
(Slovakia) M Suchá	2	6	3
11	(Slovakia) D Hantuchová	6	4	6

Third round
7	(Federal Republic of Yugoslavia) J Dokic	7	6
25	(France) N Dechy	5	2
(Slovenia) M Matevžič	4	4
11	(Slovakia) D Hantuchová	6	6

Fourth round
7	(Federal Republic of Yugoslavia) J Dokic	4	5
11	(Slovakia) D Hantuchová	6	7

==== Section 8 ====
First round
14	(Uzbekistan) I Tulyaganova	2	6	6
(Croatia) S Talaja	6	2	4
(Sweden) Å Svensson	3	2
(United States) C Rubin	6	6
(Italy) Ad Serra Zanetti	6^{4}	6^{3}
(Russia) E Bovina	7^{7}	7^{7}
(Russia) A Kournikova	1	6	4
21	(Russia) T Panova	6	4	6
30	(Argentina) C Fernández	6	6
(Slovakia) Ľ Cervanová	3	3
Q	(Belgium) E Callens	3	6	6
(Austria) B Schwartz	6	4	2
(Hungary) P Mandula	4	3
(Italy) F Schiavone	6	6
(Australia) E Dominikovic	1	1
2	(United States) S Williams	6	6

Second round
14	(Uzbekistan) I Tulyaganova	3	1
(United States) C Rubin	6	6
(Russia) E Bovina	7^{7}	3	2
21	(Russia) T Panova	6^{2}	6	6
30	(Argentina) C Fernández	6	3	4
Q	(Belgium) E Callens	2	6	6
(Italy) F Schiavone	3	3
2	(United States) S Williams	6	6

Third round
(United States) C Rubin	6	6
21	(Russia) T Panova	4	1
Q	(Belgium) E Callens	6^{5}	6^{2}
2	(United States) S Williams	7^{7}	7^{7}

Fourth round
(United States) C Rubin	3	3
2	(United States) S Williams	6	6

Preceded by 2002 French Open – Women's singles	Grand Slam women's singles	Succeeded by 2002 US Open – Women's singles
