= 2002 Wimbledon Championships – Mixed doubles =

Mixed doubles
- 2002 Wimbledon Championships

Final
- Champions: (India) Mahesh Bhupathi (Russia) Elena Likhovtseva
- Runners-up: (Zimbabwe) Kevin Ullyett (Slovakia) Daniela Hantuchová
- Score: 6–2, 1–6, 6–1

Details
- Draw: 64 (5 WC )
- Seeds: 16

Events
| Singles | men | women | | boys | girls |
| Doubles | men | women | mixed | boys | girls |
| WC Singles | men | women | quad |
| WC Doubles | men | women | quad |
| Legends | men | women | seniors |
| ← 2001 · | Wimbledon Championships | · 2003 → |

Leoš Friedl and Daniela Hantuchová were the defending champions but decided not to play together. Friedl played with Tina Križan and lost in first round to Mike Bryan and Liezel Huber, while Hantuchová competed with Kevin Ullyett.

Mahesh Bhupathi and Elena Likhovtseva defeated Ullyett and Hantuchová in the final, 6–2, 1–6, 6–1 to win the mixed doubles tennis title at the 2002 Wimbledon Championships.

== Seeds ==
1. (United States) Jared Palmer / (Australia) Rennae Stubbs (third round)
2. (United States) Donald Johnson / (United States) Kimberly Po-Messerli (semifinals)
3. (India) Mahesh Bhupathi / (Russia) Elena Likhovtseva (champions)
4. (Zimbabwe) Kevin Ullyett / (Slovakia) Daniela Hantuchová (final)
5. (India) Leander Paes / (United States) Lisa Raymond (quarterfinals)
6. (United States) Mike Bryan / (South Africa) Liezel Huber (third round)
7. (Sweden) Jonas Björkman / (Russia) Anna Kournikova (quarterfinals)
8. (The Bahamas) Mark Knowles / (Russia) Elena Bovina (first round)
9. (Argentina) Gastón Etlis / (Argentina) Paola Suárez (first round)
10. (United States) Bob Bryan / (Slovenia) Katarina Srebotnik (quarterfinals)
11. (Australia) Joshua Eagle / (Austria) Barbara Schett (third round, withdrew)
12. (Czech Republic) David Rikl / (Italy) Tathiana Garbin (second round)
13. (United States) Brian MacPhie / (South Africa) Amanda Coetzer (third round)
14. (Czech Republic) Pavel Vízner / (Italy) Roberta Vinci (second round, retired)
15. (Czech Republic) Martin Damm / (Czech Republic) Květa Hrdličková (second round)
16. (South Africa) Robbie Koenig / (Belgium) Els Callens (semifinals)

Click on the seed number of a player to go to their draw section.

== Draw ==
=== Key ===
- Q = Qualifier
- WC = Wild card
- LL = Lucky loser
- Alt = Alternate
- SE = Special exempt
- PR = Protected ranking
- ITF = ITF entry
- JE = Junior exempt
- w/o = Walkover
- r = Retired
- d = Defaulted
- SR = Special ranking

=== Finals ===
Quarterfinals
16 | (South Africa) Robbie Koenig (Belgium) Els Callens | 6 | 7
(Sweden) Johan Landsberg (Sweden) Åsa Svensson | 3 | 5
4 | (Zimbabwe) Kevin Ullyett (Slovakia) Daniela Hantuchová | 7^{7} | 4 | 6
5 | (India) Leander Paes (United States) Lisa Raymond | 6^{4} | 6 | 4
7 | (Sweden) Jonas Björkman (Russia) Anna Kournikova | 4 | 2
3 | (India) Mahesh Bhupathi (Russia) Elena Likhovtseva | 6 | 6
10 | (United States) Bob Bryan (Slovenia) Katarina Srebotnik | 6 | 3 | 4
2 | (United States) Donald Johnson (United States) Kimberly Po-Messerli | 4 | 6 | 6

Semifinals
16 | (South Africa) Robbie Koenig (Belgium) Els Callens | 3 | 6 | 2
4 | (Zimbabwe) Kevin Ullyett (Slovakia) Daniela Hantuchová | 6 | 3 | 6
3 | (India) Mahesh Bhupathi (Russia) Elena Likhovtseva | 6 | 1 | 6
2 | (United States) Donald Johnson (United States) Kimberly Po-Messerli | 4 | 6 | 3

Final
4 | (Zimbabwe) Kevin Ullyett (Slovakia) Daniela Hantuchová | 2 | 6 | 1
3 | (India) Mahesh Bhupathi (Russia) Elena Likhovtseva | 6 | 1 | 6

=== Top half ===
==== Section 1 ====
First round
1 | (United States) J Palmer (Australia) R Stubbs | 6 | 7
(Australia) S Huss (Japan) N Miyagi | 3 | 5
(Australia) A Florent (Italy) F Schiavone | 7^{7} | 7^{7}
(Zimbabwe) B Black (Zimbabwe) C Black | 6^{4} | 6^{2}
(Argentina) A Schneiter (Argentina) P Tarabini | 5 | 2
(Australia) B Ellwood (Australia) E Dominikovic | 7 | 6
(Argentina) M Hood (Italy) A Serra Zanetti | 2 | 2
16 | (South Africa) R Koenig (Belgium) E Callens | 6 | 6
12 | (Czech Republic) D Rikl (Italy) T Garbin | 7^{7} | 6
(United States) J Thomas (Chinese Taipei) J Lee | 6^{5} | 2
(South Africa) D Adams (Indonesia) W Prakusya | 6^{2} | 6 | 9
(Czech Republic) P Luxa (South Africa) N Grandin | 7^{7} | 4 | 7
(Sweden) J Landsberg (Sweden) Å Svensson | 6 | 6
WC | (United Kingdom) D Sherwood (United Kingdom) L Ahl | 1 | 1
(Zimbabwe) W Black (Kazakhstan) I Selyutina | 4 | 7^{7} | 7
8 | (The Bahamas) M Knowles (Russia) E Bovina | 6 | 6^{2} | 5

Second round
1 | (United States) J Palmer (Australia) R Stubbs | 6 | 6
(Australia) A Florent (Italy) F Schiavone | 4 | 0
(Australia) B Ellwood (Australia) E Dominikovic | 2 | 2
16 | (South Africa) R Koenig (Belgium) E Callens | 6 | 6
12 | (Czech Republic) D Rikl (Italy) T Garbin | 6 | 4 | 3
(South Africa) D Adams (Indonesia) W Prakusya | 3 | 6 | 6
(Sweden) J Landsberg (Sweden) Å Svensson | 6^{5} | 7 | 6
(Zimbabwe) W Black (Kazakhstan) I Selyutina | 7^{7} | 5 | 1

Third round
1 | (United States) J Palmer (Australia) R Stubbs | 4 | 3
16 | (South Africa) R Koenig (Belgium) E Callens | 6 | 6
(South Africa) D Adams (Indonesia) W Prakusya | 2 | 6^{7}
(Sweden) J Landsberg (Sweden) Å Svensson | 6 | 7^{9}

Quarterfinals
16 | (South Africa) R Koenig (Belgium) E Callens | 6 | 7
(Sweden) J Landsberg (Sweden) Å Svensson | 3 | 5

==== Section 2 ====
First round
4 | (Zimbabwe) K Ullyett (Slovakia) D Hantuchová
WC | (Ecuador) N Lapentti (Croatia) I Majoli | w/o
WC | (United Kingdom) K Spencer (United Kingdom) L Woodroffe | 3 | 6^{3}
(South Africa) C Haggard (Australia) C Barclay | 6 | 7^{7}
(Federal Republic of Yugoslavia) N Zimonjić (Federal Republic of Yugoslavia) D Zarić | 3 | 4
WC | (United Kingdom) L Childs (United Kingdom) E Baltacha | 6 | 6
(Czech Republic) C Suk (Russia) A Rodionova | 1 | 2
14 | (Czech Republic) P Vízner (Italy) R Vinci | 6 | 6
11 | (Australia) J Eagle (Austria) B Schett | 6 | 4 | 6
(Australia) M Hill (Netherlands) C Vis | 2 | 6 | 2
(Argentina) D Orsanic (Venezuela) M Vento-Kabchi | 6 | 6
(Czech Republic) T Cibulec (Czech Republic) E Martincová | 4 | 4
(Netherlands) P Haarhuis (Netherlands) M Oremans | 7^{7} | 6
(Czech Republic) D Vacek (Belarus) T Poutchek | 6^{3} | 3
(Germany) K Braasch (Germany) B Rittner | 2 | 6 | 7
5 | (India) L Paes (United States) L Raymond | 6 | 3 | 9

Second round
4 | (Zimbabwe) K Ullyett (Slovakia) D Hantuchová | 6^{8} | 6 | 6
(South Africa) C Haggard (Australia) C Barclay | 7^{10} | 3 | 4
WC | (United Kingdom) L Childs (United Kingdom) E Baltacha | 6 | 4
14 | (Czech Republic) P Vízner (Italy) R Vinci | 3 | 1^{r}
11 | (Australia) J Eagle (Austria) B Schett | 6 | 7^{7}
(Argentina) D Orsanic (Venezuela) M Vento-Kabchi | 3 | 6^{2}
(Netherlands) P Haarhuis (Netherlands) M Oremans | 6 | 5 | 3
5 | (India) L Paes (United States) L Raymond | 4 | 7 | 6

Third round
4 | (Zimbabwe) K Ullyett (Slovakia) D Hantuchová | 7 | 6
WC | (United Kingdom) L Childs (United Kingdom) E Baltacha | 5 | 3
11 | (Australia) J Eagle (Austria) B Schett | w/o
5 | (India) L Paes (United States) L Raymond

Quarterfinals
4 | (Zimbabwe) K Ullyett (Slovakia) D Hantuchová | 7^{7} | 4 | 6
5 | (India) L Paes (United States) L Raymond | 6^{4} | 6 | 4

=== Bottom half ===
==== Section 3 ====
First round
7 | (Sweden) J Björkman (Russia) A Kournikova | 6 | 6^{5} | 6
(South Africa) M Barnard (Netherlands) K Boogert | 3 | 7^{7} | 4
(Australia) J Kerr (Netherlands) A van Exel | 6 | 3 | 7
(Australia) T Woodbridge (United States) M Navratilova | 4 | 6 | 9
(Russia) A Olhovskiy (Ukraine) E Tatarkova | 5 | 2
(Czech Republic) P Pála (Czech Republic) D Bedáňová | 7 | 6
(Australia) A Kratzmann (Australia) T Musgrave | 2 | 7^{7} | 6
9 | (Argentina) G Etlis (Argentina) P Suárez | 6 | 6^{2} | 4
15 | (Czech Republic) M Damm (Czech Republic) K Hrdličková | 6 | 6
(Argentina) L Arnold Ker (Paraguay) R de los Ríos | 1 | 1
(United States) J Tarango (Belarus) N Zvereva | 3 | 4
(Japan) T Shimada (Japan) R Fujiwara | 6 | 6
(United States) D Bowen (Japan) R Hiraki | 4 | 4
(Australia) D Macpherson (United States) K Schlukebir | 6 | 6
(Australia) S Stolle (Australia) R McQuillan | 3 | 4
3 | (India) M Bhupathi (Russia) E Likhovtseva | 6 | 6

Second round
7 | (Sweden) J Björkman (Russia) A Kournikova | 3 | 6 | 6
(Australia) T Woodbridge (United States) M Navratilova | 6 | 4 | 2
(Czech Republic) P Pála (Czech Republic) D Bedáňová | 0^{r}
(Australia) A Kratzmann (Australia) T Musgrave | 0
15 | (Czech Republic) M Damm (Czech Republic) K Hrdličková | 2 | 1
(Japan) T Shimada (Japan) R Fujiwara | 6 | 6
(Australia) D Macpherson (United States) K Schlukebir | 5 | 4
3 | (India) M Bhupathi (Russia) E Likhovtseva | 7 | 6

Third round
7 | (Sweden) J Björkman (Russia) A Kournikova | 7 | 6
(Australia) A Kratzmann (Australia) T Musgrave | 5 | 4
(Japan) T Shimada (Japan) R Fujiwara | 2 | 5
3 | (India) M Bhupathi (Russia) E Likhovtseva | 6 | 7

Quarterfinals
7 | (Sweden) J Björkman (Russia) A Kournikova | 4 | 2
3 | (India) M Bhupathi (Russia) E Likhovtseva | 6 | 6

==== Section 4 ====
First round
6 | (United States) M Bryan (South Africa) L Huber | 6 | 6
(Czech Republic) L Friedl (Slovenia) T Križan | 2 | 4
(Belgium) T Vanhoudt (France) A Fusai | 4 | 6^{5}
(United States) R Leach (Australia) L McShea | 6 | 7^{7}
(Australia) N Healey (United States) A Spears | 4 | 6 | 6
(Australia) T Perry (United States) A Augustus | 6 | 4 | 2
WC | (United Kingdom) B Cowan (United Kingdom) V Davies | 1 | 1
10 | (United States) B Bryan (Slovenia) K Srebotnik | 6 | 6
13 | (United States) B MacPhie (South Africa) A Coetzer | 6 | 6
(Czech Republic) O Fukárek (Slovakia) J Husárová | 2 | 3
(South Africa) J-L de Jager (South Africa) K Grant | 7^{9} | 2 | 7
(Argentina) M Rodríguez (United States) S Reeves | 6^{7} | 6 | 9
(Sweden) S Aspelin (South Africa) N de Villiers | 4 | 7^{7} | 6
(North Macedonia) A Kitinov (Slovenia) M Matevžič | 6 | 6^{4} | 4
(Argentina) L Lobo (Argentina) L Montalvo | 5 | 3
2 | (United States) D Johnson (United States) K Po-Messerli | 7 | 6

Second round
6 | (United States) M Bryan (South Africa) L Huber | 6 | 6
(United States) R Leach (Australia) L McShea | 3 | 4
(Australia) N Healey (United States) A Spears | 4 | 4
10 | (United States) B Bryan (Slovenia) K Srebotnik | 6 | 6
13 | (United States) B MacPhie (South Africa) A Coetzer | 7^{7} | 4 | 8
(Argentina) M Rodríguez (United States) S Reeves | 6^{3} | 6 | 6
(Sweden) S Aspelin (South Africa) N de Villiers | 6^{4} | 3
2 | (United States) D Johnson (United States) K Po-Messerli | 7^{7} | 6

Third round
6 | (United States) M Bryan (South Africa) L Huber | 6 | 2 | 3
10 | (United States) B Bryan (Slovenia) K Srebotnik | 3 | 6 | 6
13 | (United States) B MacPhie (South Africa) A Coetzer | 5 | 3
2 | (United States) D Johnson (United States) K Po-Messerli | 7 | 6

Quarterfinals
10 | (United States) B Bryan (Slovenia) K Srebotnik | 6 | 3 | 4
2 | (United States) D Johnson (United States) K Po-Messerli | 4 | 6 | 6
