= Jolanda Mens =

Dutch tennis player (born 1978)

- Country (sports): Netherlands
- Born: 4 February 1978 (age 47); Leiden, Netherlands
- Height: 181 cm (5 ft 11 in)
- Plays: Right-handed
- Prize money: $52,781

Singles
- Career record: 120–143
- Career titles: 2 ITF
- Highest ranking: No. 285 (3 February 2003)

Doubles
- Career record: 156–108
- Career titles: 14 ITF
- Highest ranking: No. 199 (1 October 2001)

Jolanda Mens (born 4 February 1978) is a Dutch former professional tennis player.

Mens, a right-handed player from Leiden, spent most time of her career on the ITF Circuit. She won two ITF singles titles, including one at a $25k tournament in Campos do Jordão. As a doubles player, she claimed 14 ITF titles and featured in the main draw of three WTA Tour tournaments, in Den Bosch, Waikoloa (Hawaii) and Québec in 2002.

== ITF Circuit finals ==
$50,000 tournaments
$25,000 tournaments
$10,000 tournaments

=== Singles: 5 (2 titles, 3 runner-ups) ===
Result	No.	Date	Tournament	Surface	Opponent	Score
Loss	1.	23 June 1997	ITF Velp, Netherlands	Clay	(Switzerland) Eva Bes	4–6, 7–6^{(2)}, 5–7
Loss	2.	21 August 2000	ITF Kastoria, Greece	Carpet	(Greece) Eleni Daniilidou	3–6, 1–6
Win	1.	3 June 2002	ITF Poznań, Poland	Clay	(Romania) Liana Ungur	6–0, 7–5
Loss	3.	10 June 2002	ITF Raalte, Netherlands	Clay	(Netherlands) Silvana Bauer	1–6, 0–6
Win	2.	21 July 2002	ITF Campos do Jordão, Brazil	Hard	(Brazil) Maria Fernanda Alves	6–2, 4–6, 6–2

=== Doubles: 36 (14 titles, 22 runner-ups) ===
Result	No.	Date	Tournament	Surface	Partner	Opponents	Score
Win	1.	9 June 1997	ITF Bossonnens, Switzerland	Clay	(Netherlands) Kim Kilsdonk	(Switzerland) Laura Bao (Switzerland) Caecilia Charbonnier	6–4, 6–2
Win	2.	16 June 1997	ITF Klosters-Serneus, Switzerland	Clay	(Netherlands) Kim Kilsdonk	(Uruguay) Elena Juricich (Venezuela) Milagros Sequera	6–7^{(8)}, 6–4, 6–2
Loss	1.	29 June 1997	ITF Velp, Netherlands	Clay	(Netherlands) Kim Kilsdonk	(Bulgaria) Galina Dimitrova (Bulgaria) Dessislava Topalova	7–5, 5–7, 4–6
Loss	2.	5 July 1997	ITF Hoorn, Netherlands	Clay	(Netherlands) Kim Kilsdonk	(Netherlands) Yvette Basting (Slovakia) Simona Gáliková	1–6, 6–1, 4–6
Win	3.	4 August 1997	ITF Rebecq, Belgium	Clay	(Netherlands) Kim Kilsdonk	(Sweden) Annica Lindstedt (Netherlands) Annemarie Mikkers	6–3, 6–4
Win	4.	12 January 1998	ITF Reykjavík, Iceland	Carpet (i)	(Netherlands) Kim Kilsdonk	(Czech Republic) Olga Blahotová (Czech Republic) Gabriela Navrátilová	6–4, 5–7, 7–5
Loss	3.	22 June 1998	ITF Velp, Netherlands	Clay	(Netherlands) Kim Kilsdonk	(Netherlands) Claudia Reimering (Netherlands) Andrea van den Hurk	4–6, 4–6
Win	5.	20 September 1998	ITF Constanța, Romania	Clay	(Netherlands) Debby Haak	(Georgia (country)) Nino Louarsabishvili (Romania) Alice Pirsu	6–3, 7–6
Win	6.	15 March 1999	ITF Petroupoli, Greece	Clay	(Netherlands) Andrea van den Hurk	(Hungary) Adrienn Hegedűs (Germany) Vanessa Henke	6–4, 6–3
Loss	4.	25 April 1999	ITF Jakarta, Indonesia	Hard	(Switzerland) Dianne Asensio	(Indonesia) Irawati Iskandar (Indonesia) Wynne Prakusya	1–6, 3–6
Loss	5.	27 June 1999	ITF Velp, Netherlands	Clay	(Australia) Evie Dominikovic	(Netherlands) Natasha Galouza (Hungary) Katalin Miskolczi	3–6, 5–7
Loss	6.	4 July 1999	ITF Alkmaar, Netherlands	Clay	(Netherlands) Anouk Sterk	(Austria) Stefanie Haidner (Netherlands) Debby Haak	4–6, 6–1, 3–6
Loss	7.	10 September 2000	ITF Mollerussa, Spain	Carpet	(United Kingdom) Hannah Collin	(Switzerland) Marylene Losey (Switzerland) Lucia Tallo	5–7, 3–6
Loss	8.	30 September 2000	ITF Tbilisi, Georgia	Clay	(Slovakia) Alena Paulenková	(Argentina) Mariana Díaz Oliva (Italy) Mara Santangelo	6–4, 3–6, 2–6
Loss	9.	4 March 2001	Bendigo International, Australia	Hard	(Netherlands) Debby Haak	(New Zealand) Leanne Baker (New Zealand) Shelley Stephens	3–6, 2–6
Loss	10.	18 March 2001	ITF Benalla, Australia	Grass	(Netherlands) Debby Haak	(Australia) Monique Adamczak (Australia) Samantha Stosur	3–6, 5–7
Win	7.	1 April 2001	ITF Corowa, Australia	Grass	(Netherlands) Debby Haak	(Australia) Beti Sekulovski (Australia) Nicole Sewell	6–4, 6–3
Loss	11.	17 June 2001	ITF Raalte, Netherlands	Clay	(Netherlands) Debby Haak	(Federal Republic of Yugoslavia) Milica Koprivica (Netherlands) Anouk Sterk	2–6, 7–5, 6–7^{(2)}
Loss	12.	1 July 2001	ITF Alkmaar, Netherlands	Clay	(Netherlands) Debby Haak	(Netherlands) Susanne Trik (Netherlands) Anouk Sterk	4–6, 4–6
Win	8.	30 July 2001	ITF Pontevedra, Spain	Hard	(Netherlands) Natasha Galouza	(Ukraine) Oleksandra Kravets (Spain) Arantxa Parra Santonja	7–6^{(5)}, 6–2
Loss	13.	26 August 2001	ITF Enschede, Netherlands	Clay	(Netherlands) Debby Haak	(Netherlands) Natalia Galouza (Netherlands) Lotty Seelen	0–6, 6–2, 5–7
Loss	14.	9 September 2001	ITF Denain, France	Clay	(Netherlands) Debby Haak	(France) Émilie Loit (Kazakhstan) Irina Selyutina	1–6, 3–6
Loss	15.	27 January 2002	ITF Courmayeur, Italy	Hard	(Ukraine) Yuliya Beygelzimer	(Russia) Gulnara Fattakhetdinova (Russia) Maria Kondratieva	7–5, 3–6, 4–6
Win	9.	31 March 2002	ITF Athens, Greece	Clay	(Netherlands) Andrea van den Hurk	(Serbia and Montenegro) Ana Četnik (Serbia and Montenegro) Dragica Joksimović	7–5, 6–1
Win	10.	3 June 2002	ITF Poznań, Poland	Clay	(Netherlands) Tessy van de Ven	(Argentina) Celeste Contín (Uruguay) Ana Lucía Migliarini de León	6–2, 6–2
Win	11.	10 June 2002	ITF Raalte, Netherlands	Clay	(Australia) Sarah Stone	(Australia) Darya Ivanova (Australia) Tiffany Welford	4–6, 6–3, 6–0
Loss	16.	24 June 2002	ITF Alkmaar, Netherlands	Clay	(Australia) Sarah Stone	(Netherlands) Kim Kilsdonk (Austria) Nicole Melch	6–7^{(2)}, 2–6
Loss	17.	30 June 2002	ITF Rabat, Morocco	Clay	(Netherlands) Debby Haak	(Russia) Gulnara Fattakhetdinova (Russia) Maria Kondratieva	3–6, 5–7
Loss	18.	21 July 2002	ITF Campos do Jordão, Brazil	Hard	(Netherlands) Andrea van den Hurk	(Brazil) Bruna Colósio (Brazil) Carla Tiene	1–6, 6–4, 4–6
Loss	19.	18 May 2003	ITF Casale Monferrato, Italy	Clay	(Germany) Stefanie Weis	(New Zealand) Leanne Baker (Belgium) Elke Clijsters	1–6, 2–6
Loss	20.	23 June 2003	ITF Alkmaar, Netherlands	Clay	(Netherlands) Marielle Hoogland	(Belgium) Leslie Butkiewicz (Netherlands) Kim Kilsdonk	1–6, 4–6
Win	12.	24 August 2003	ITF Enschede, Netherlands	Clay	(Netherlands) Michelle Gerards	(Netherlands) Kika Hogendoorn (Romania) Laura-Ramona Husaru	6–3, 7–6^{(5)}
Loss	21.	31 August 2003	ITF Alphen a/d Rijn, Netherlands	Clay	(Netherlands) Anouk Sterk	(Netherlands) Tessy van de Ven (Netherlands) Suzanne van Hartingsveldt	2–6, 2–6
Loss	22.	16 February 2004	ITF Capriolo, Italy	Carpet	(Germany) Stefanie Weis	(Finland) Emma Laine (Finland) Essi Laine	3–6, 3–6
Win	13.	11 April 2004	ITF Torre del Greco, Italy	Clay	(South Africa) Chanelle Scheepers	(Netherlands) Michelle Gerards (Netherlands) Marielle Hoogland	6–3, 6–0
Win	14.	1 November 2004	ITF Stockholm, Sweden	Hard	(Netherlands) Michaëlla Krajicek	(Russia) Sofia Avakova (Latvia) Irina Kuzmina	6–2, 6–3
