= 2002 Wimbledon Championships – Women's doubles =

Women's doubles
- 2002 Wimbledon Championships

Final
- Champions: (United States) Serena Williams (United States) Venus Williams
- Runners-up: (Spain) Virginia Ruano Pascual (Argentina) Paola Suárez
- Score: 6–2, 7–5

Details
- Draw: 64 (4 Q / 6 WC )
- Seeds: 16

Events
Singles	men	women		boys	girls
Doubles	men	women	mixed	boys	girls
WC Singles	men	women	quad
WC Doubles	men	women	quad
Legends	men	women	seniors
← 2001 ·	Wimbledon Championships	· 2003 →

Serena and Venus Williams defeated Virginia Ruano Pascual and Paola Suárez in the final, 6–2, 7–5 to win the ladies' doubles tennis title at the 2002 Wimbledon Championships. It was their second Wimbledon doubles title together and fifth major title together overall.

Lisa Raymond and Rennae Stubbs were the defending champions, but lost in the quarterfinals to Anna Kournikova and Chanda Rubin.

== Seeds ==
1. (United States) Lisa Raymond / (Australia) Rennae Stubbs (quarterfinals)
2. (Spain) Virginia Ruano Pascual / (Argentina) Paola Suárez (final)
3. (United States) Serena Williams / (United States) Venus Williams (champions)
4. (Zimbabwe) Cara Black / (Russia) Elena Likhovtseva (semifinals)
5. (United States) Kimberly Po-Messerli / (France) Nathalie Tauziat (quarterfinals)
6. (France) Sandrine Testud / (Italy) Roberta Vinci (third round)
7. (United States) Nicole Arendt / (United States) Liezel Huber (second round)
8. (Russia) Elena Dementieva / (Slovakia) Janette Husárová (first round)
9. (Japan) Rika Fujiwara / (Japan) Ai Sugiyama (third round)
10. (Slovenia) Tina Križan / (Slovenia) Katarina Srebotnik (quarterfinals)
11. (Chinese Taipei) Janet Lee / (Indonesia) Wynne Prakusya (third round)
12. (Italy) Silvia Farina Elia / (Austria) Barbara Schett (third round)
13. (Belgium) Els Callens / (United States) Meghann Shaughnessy (third round)
14. (Czech Republic) Dája Bedáňová / (Russia) Elena Bovina (first round)
15. (South Africa) Amanda Coetzer / (United States) Lori McNeil (second round)
16. (United States) Jennifer Capriati / (Slovakia) Daniela Hantuchová (second round)

Click on the seed number of a player to go to their draw section.

== Draw ==
=== Key ===
- Q = Qualifier
- WC = Wild card
- LL = Lucky loser
- Alt = Alternate
- ITF = ITF entry
- PR = Protected ranking
- SR = Special ranking
- SE = Special exempt
- JE = Junior exempt
- JR = Junior Accelerator Programme entrant
- CO = College Accelerator Programme entrant
- NG = Next Gen Accelerator Program entrant
- w/o = Walkover
- r = Retired
- d = Defaulted

=== Finals ===
Quarterfinals
1	(United States) Lisa Raymond (Australia) Rennae Stubbs	6	5	4
(Russia) Anna Kournikova (United States) Chanda Rubin	1	7	6
3/ WC	(United States) Serena Williams (United States) Venus Williams	6	6
10	(Slovenia) Tina Križan (Slovenia) Katarina Srebotnik	2	0
5	(United States) Kimberly Po-Messerli (France) Nathalie Tauziat	5	6^{3}
4	(Zimbabwe) Cara Black (Russia) Elena Likhovtseva	7	7
(Russia) Anastasia Rodionova (Germany) Marlene Weingärtner	6^{4}	5
2	(Spain) Virginia Ruano Pascual (Argentina) Paola Suárez	7	7

Semifinals
(Russia) Anna Kournikova (United States) Chanda Rubin	7	0	3
3/ WC	(United States) Serena Williams (United States) Venus Williams	6^{3}	6	6
4	(Zimbabwe) Cara Black (Russia) Elena Likhovtseva	3	6	4
2	(Spain) Virginia Ruano Pascual (Argentina) Paola Suárez	6	3	6

Final
3/ WC	(United States) Serena Williams (United States) Venus Williams	6	7
2	(Spain) Virginia Ruano Pascual (Argentina) Paola Suárez	2	5

=== Top half ===
==== Section 1 ====
First round
1	(United States) L Raymond (Australia) R Stubbs	6	6
(Czech Republic) E Martincová (Belarus) N Ostrovskaya	1	1
(Slovenia) T Pisnik (United States) K Schlukebir	6	6^{2}	4
(Australia) E Dominikovic (South Africa) J Steck	3	7^{7}	6
(Spain) C Martínez (France) M Pierce	2	6	8
(France) A Fusai (Netherlands) C Vis	6	1	6
(Hungary) P Mandula (Austria) P Wartusch	6	5	4
16	(United States) J Capriati (Slovakia) D Hantuchová	4	7	6
11	(Chinese Taipei) J Lee (Indonesia) W Prakusya	5	6	6
(Italy) T Garbin (Indonesia) A Widjaja	7	3	4
(Germany) B Lamade (United States) S Reeves	6	2	5
(Ukraine) T Perebiynis (Belarus) T Poutchek	0	6	7
(Russia) A Kournikova (United States) C Rubin	6	6
(Spain) E Bes (Spain) M Marrero	1	1
WC	(United Kingdom) A Keothavong (United Kingdom) R Viollet	0	3
7	(United States) N Arendt (South Africa) L Huber	6	6

Second round
1	(United States) L Raymond (Australia) R Stubbs	6	6
(Australia) E Dominikovic (South Africa) J Steck	0	2
(Spain) C Martínez (France) M Pierce	6	6
16	(United States) J Capriati (Slovakia) D Hantuchová	4	4
11	(Chinese Taipei) J Lee (Indonesia) W Prakusya	6	6
(Ukraine) T Perebiynis (Belarus) T Poutchek	3	0
(Russia) A Kournikova (United States) C Rubin	6	7
7	(United States) N Arendt (South Africa) L Huber	4	5

Third round
1	(United States) L Raymond (Australia) R Stubbs	6	7^{7}
(Spain) C Martínez (France) M Pierce	3	6^{5}
11	(Chinese Taipei) J Lee (Indonesia) W Prakusya	2	2
(Russia) A Kournikova (United States) C Rubin	6	6

Quarterfinals
1	(United States) L Raymond (Australia) R Stubbs	6	5	4
(Russia) A Kournikova (United States) C Rubin	1	7	6

==== Section 2 ====
First round
3/ WC	(United States) S Williams (United States) V Williams	6	6
(Germany) K Freye (Japan) R Hiraki	2	2
(Argentina) C Fernández (Italy) R Grande	6	4	4
(Czech Republic) K Hrdličková (Switzerland) P Schnyder	1	6	6
(Argentina) L Montalvo (Ukraine) E Tatarkova	6	6^{6}	6
(Croatia) I Majoli (Argentina) P Tarabini	2	7^{8}	4
WC	(United States) M Irvin (United States) A Stevenson	7^{7}	3	5
15	(South Africa) A Coetzer (United States) L McNeil	6^{2}	6	7
10	(Slovenia) T Križan (Slovenia) K Srebotnik	5	6	6
(South Africa) K Grant (United States) A Spears	7	4	4
(Germany) B Rittner (Venezuela) M Vento-Kabchi	3	6	1
(Netherlands) K Boogert (Netherlands) M Oremans	6	3	6
(Sweden) Å Svensson (Uzbekistan) I Tulyaganova	4	6	6
(Russia) G Fokina (Russia) T Panova	6	3	2
WC	(United Kingdom) L Ahl (United Kingdom) E Baltacha	4	2
6	(France) S Testud (Italy) R Vinci	6	6

Second round
3/ WC	(United States) S Williams (United States) V Williams	6	6
(Czech Republic) K Hrdličková (Switzerland) P Schnyder	1	2
(Argentina) L Montalvo (Ukraine) E Tatarkova	4	7^{7}	6
15	(South Africa) A Coetzer (United States) L McNeil	6	6^{5}	3
10	(Slovenia) T Križan (Slovenia) K Srebotnik	4	6	6
(Netherlands) K Boogert (Netherlands) M Oremans	6	3	1
(Sweden) Å Svensson (Uzbekistan) I Tulyaganova	4	4
6	(France) S Testud (Italy) R Vinci	6	6

Third round
3/ WC	(United States) S Williams (United States) V Williams	6	6
(Argentina) L Montalvo (Ukraine) E Tatarkova	2	2
10	(Slovenia) T Križan (Slovenia) K Srebotnik
6	(France) S Testud (Italy) R Vinci	w/o

Quarterfinals
3/ WC	(United States) S Williams (United States) V Williams	6	6
10	(Slovenia) T Križan (Slovenia) K Srebotnik	2	0

=== Bottom half ===
==== Section 3 ====
First round
5	(United States) K Po-Messerli (France) N Tauziat	6	6
(Slovenia) M Matevžič (Federal Republic of Yugoslavia) D Zarić	0	4
(Italy) Ad Serra Zanetti (Italy) An Serra Zanetti	3	2
(United States) M Navratilova (Belarus) N Zvereva	6	6
(France) N Dechy (United States) M Tu	7	7^{7}
Q	(Canada) R Kolbovic (Venezuela) M Sequera	5	6^{5}
(Netherlands) A van Exel (South Africa) N Grandin	3	2
9	(Japan) R Fujiwara (Japan) A Sugiyama	6	6
14	(Czech Republic) D Bedáňová (Russia) E Bovina	4	6^{5}
(South Africa) N de Villiers (Kazakhstan) I Selyutina	6	7^{7}
WC	(United Kingdom) J Pullin (United Kingdom) L Woodroffe	6^{4}	6	1
Q	(Russia) A Jidkova (Australia) B Stewart	7^{7}	2	6
(Australia) T Musgrave (Thailand) T Tanasugarn	6	6
LL	(Czech Republic) L Němečková (Romania) A Vanc	0	1
Q	(Argentina) G Dulko (Russia) S Kuznetsova	2	3
4	(Zimbabwe) C Black (Russia) E Likhovtseva	6	6

Second round
5	(United States) K Po-Messerli (France) N Tauziat	6	2	8
(United States) M Navratilova (Belarus) N Zvereva	3	6	6
(France) N Dechy (United States) M Tu	3	1
9	(Japan) R Fujiwara (Japan) A Sugiyama	6	6
(South Africa) N de Villiers (Kazakhstan) I Selyutina	5	7^{7}	6
Q	(Russia) A Jidkova (Australia) B Stewart	7	6^{0}	3
(Australia) T Musgrave (Thailand) T Tanasugarn	7	0	4
4	(Zimbabwe) C Black (Russia) E Likhovtseva	5	6	6

Third round
5	(United States) K Po-Messerli (France) N Tauziat	3	6	6
9	(Japan) R Fujiwara (Japan) A Sugiyama	6	4	3
(South Africa) N de Villiers (Kazakhstan) I Selyutina	3	3
4	(Zimbabwe) C Black (Russia) E Likhovtseva	6	6

Quarterfinals
5	(United States) K Po-Messerli (France) N Tauziat	5	6^{3}
4	(Zimbabwe) C Black (Russia) E Likhovtseva	7	7^{7}

==== Section 4 ====
First round
8	(Russia) E Dementieva (Slovakia) J Husárová	6	1	1
(Japan) S Asagoe (Japan) N Miyagi	4	6	6
WC	(United Kingdom) H Crook (United Kingdom) V Davies	6	1	3
(Russia) A Rodionova (Germany) M Weingärtner	2	6	6
(France) C Dhenin (France) É Loit	6	6
(Australia) R McQuillan (Australia) L McShea	1	3
(Switzerland) E Gagliardi (Italy) F Schiavone	4	6	2
12	(Italy) S Farina Elia (Austria) B Schett	6	2	6
13	(Belgium) E Callens (United States) M Shaughnessy	7^{7}	7^{7}
(Australia) A Molik (Spain) M Serna	6^{2}	6^{2}
(United States) A Augustus (United States) J Embry	4	5
(Croatia) J Kostanić (Slovakia) H Nagyová	6	7
(Australia) C Barclay (Australia) C Wheeler	6	6
(Paraguay) R de los Ríos (United States) L Osterloh	3	2
Q	(United Kingdom) A Hawkins (United Kingdom) J O'Donoghue	1	6^{4}
2	(Spain) V Ruano Pascual (Argentina) P Suárez	6	7^{7}

Second round
(Japan) S Asagoe (Japan) N Miyagi	6	6^{10}	1
(Russia) A Rodionova (Germany) M Weingärtner	1	7^{12}	6
(France) C Dhenin (France) É Loit	6	4	4
12	(Italy) S Farina Elia (Austria) B Schett	4	6	6
13	(Belgium) E Callens (United States) M Shaughnessy	6	6
(Croatia) J Kostanić (Slovakia) H Nagyová	3	2
(Australia) C Barclay (Australia) C Wheeler	5	2
2	(Spain) V Ruano Pascual (Argentina) P Suárez	7	6

Third round
(Russia) A Rodionova (Germany) M Weingärtner	6	4	6
12	(Italy) S Farina Elia (Austria) B Schett	2	6	4
13	(Belgium) E Callens (United States) M Shaughnessy	2	6	6
2	(Spain) V Ruano Pascual (Argentina) P Suárez	6	4	8

Quarterfinals
(Russia) A Rodionova (Germany) M Weingärtner	6^{4}	5
2	(Spain) V Ruano Pascual (Argentina) P Suárez	7^{7}	7
