= Robin Stephenson =

American tennis player

- Country (sports): United States
- Born: June 21, 1983 (age 41); Canada
- Turned pro: 2007
- Retired: 2010
- Plays: Right-handed (two-handed backhand)
- Prize money: $30,366

Singles
- Career record: 44–46
- Career titles: 0
- Highest ranking: No. 435 (February 11, 2008)

Doubles
- Career record: 101–53
- Career titles: 13 ITF
- Highest ranking: No. 157 (December 8, 2008)

Robin Stephenson (born June 21, 1983) is an American former professional tennis player. Her career-high WTA singles ranking is No. 435, which she reached on February 11, 2008. Her career-high doubles ranking is 157, set on December 8, 2008.

She played collegiately for the Alabama Crimson Tide, earning All-American honors in 2005 for a national ranking of No. 6 in singles. She was a volunteer assistant coach for the Georgia Tech Yellow Jackets women's tennis team, before moving on to Georgia State and eventually to the University of Washington, where she is the current head coach.

== ITF Circuit finals ==
=== Doubles: 20 (13–7) ===
Legend
$100,000 tournaments
$75,000 tournaments
$50,000 tournaments
$25,000 tournaments
$10,000 tournaments

Outcome	No.	Date	Tournament	Surface	Partner	Opponents	Score
Winner	1.	5 June 2005	Hilton Head, United States	Hard	(United States) Shadisha Robinson	(United States) Ansley Cargill (United States) Aleke Tsoubanos	6–3, 7–5
Runner-up	1.	26 June 2005	Edmond, United States	Hard	(United States) Sarah Riske	(United States) Tamara Encina (United States) Daron Moore	6–7, 4–6
Runner-up	2.	18 February 2007	Montechoro, Portugal	Hard	(United States) Jessica Lehnhoff	(Netherlands) Marrit Boonstra (Netherlands) Nicole Thijssen	3–6, 6–3, 2–6
Runner-up	3.	26 February 2007	Portimão, Portugal	Hard	(United States) Jessica Lehnhoff	(Portugal) Neuza Silva (Netherlands) Nicole Thijssen	4–6, 2–6
Runner-up	4.	17 March 2007	Mérida, Mexico	Hard	(South Africa) Chanelle Scheepers	(Brazil) Maria Fernanda Alves (Argentina) Vanina García Sokol	3–6, 2–6
Winner	2.	24 March 2007	Coatzacoalcos, Mexico	Hard	(South Africa) Chanelle Scheepers	(Latvia) Līga Dekmeijere (United States) Story Tweedie-Yates	6–2, 6–2
Winner	3.	13 May 2007	Mazatlán, Mexico	Hard	(United States) Courtney Nagle	(Mexico) Valeria Pulido (Mexico) Daniela Múñoz Gallegos	7–5, 6–4
Winner	4.	20 May 2007	Irapuato, Mexico	Hard	(United States) Courtney Nagle	(Mexico) Lorena Arias (Mexico) Erika Clarke	6–1, 6–3
Runner-up	5.	24 June 2007	Fort Worth, United States	Hard	(South Africa) Surina De Beer	(Slovakia) Dominika Diešková (United States) Courtney Nagle	5–7, 3–6
Winner	5.	14 October 2007	Rockhampton, Australia	Hard	(United States) Courtney Nagle	(Australia) Alison Bai (Australia) Jessica Moore	6–4, 6–3
Winner	6.	21 October 2007	Gympie, Australia	Hard	(United States) Courtney Nagle	(Australia) Monique Adamczak (United Kingdom) Jade Curtis	6–4, 6–1
Runner-up	6.	26 October 2007	Traralgon, Australia	Hard	(United States) Courtney Nagle	(Japan) Erika Sema (Japan) Yurika Sema	2–6, 2–6
Winner	7.	16 November 2007	Nuriootpa, Australia	Hard	(South Africa) Natalie Grandin	(Australia) Sophie Ferguson (Australia) Trudi Musgrave	6–4, 7–5
Winner	8.	29 March 2008	Jersey, United Kingdom	Hard (i)	(United States) Courtney Nagle	(France) Yulia Fedossova (France) Violette Huck	6–3, 6–3
Winner	9.	10 May 2008	Irapuato, Mexico	Hard	(United Kingdom) Sarah Borwell	(Switzerland) Stefania Boffa (Czech Republic) Nikola Fraňková	6–4, 3–6, [10–4]
Runner-up	7.	21 September 2008	Kawana, Australia	Hard	(United States) Alexis Prousis	(United Kingdom) Jocelyn Rae (Australia) Emelyn Starr	4–6, 6–4, [4–10]
Winner	10.	12 October 2008	Traralgon, Australia	Hard	(South Africa) Natalie Grandin	(Australia) Jarmila Gajdošová (Australia) Jessica Moore	6–4, 6–2
Winner	11.	19 October 2008	Mount Gambier, Australia	Hard	(South Africa) Natalie Grandin	(Japan) Miki Miyamura (Japan) Erika Sema	6–4, 6–2
Winner	12.	26 October 2008	Port Pirie, Australia	Hard	(South Africa) Natalie Grandin	(South Africa) Lizaan du Plessis (Australia) Tiffany Welford	6–2, 6–0
Winner	13.	30 November 2008	Perth, Australia	Hard	(United States) Alexis Prousis	(United Kingdom) Jade Curtis (Chinese Taipei) Hwang I-hsuan	7–6^{(7–5)}, 7–6^{(7–4)}
