= 2002 Wimbledon Championships – Men's singles =

Tennis tournament held in 2002

Men's singles
- 2002 Wimbledon Championships

Final
- Champion: (Australia) Lleyton Hewitt
- Runner-up: (Argentina) David Nalbandian
- Score: 6–1, 6–3, 6–2

Details
- Draw: 128 (16 Q / 8 WC )
- Seeds: 32

Events
Singles	men	women		boys	girls
Doubles	men	women	mixed	boys	girls
WC Singles	men	women	quad
WC Doubles	men	women	quad
Legends	men	women	seniors
← 2001 ·	Wimbledon Championships	· 2003 →

Lleyton Hewitt defeated David Nalbandian in the final, 6–1, 6–3, 6–2 to win the gentlemen's singles tennis title at the 2002 Wimbledon Championships. It was his second and last major title, after the 2001 US Open. Hewitt was the first Australian to win the title since Pat Cash in 1987.

Goran Ivanišević was the reigning champion, but withdrew due to a shoulder surgery. He would not return to Wimbledon until 2004.

The tournament was notable for the poor results of the top players. With the exception of Hewitt and world No. 4 Tim Henman, the rest of the top 17 seeds were eliminated before the fourth round. In one of the biggest upsets in Wimbledon history, seven-time champion Pete Sampras was defeated by № 145-ranked George Bastl in the second round, in what would be Sampras' last appearance at Wimbledon. The 1992 champion Andre Agassi suffered a second-round defeat to unseeded Paradorn Srichaphan. Future eight-time champion Roger Federer was defeated in the first round by qualifier Mario Ančić, his last defeat at Wimbledon until the 2008 final, spanning a record five straight Wimbledon titles between 2003 and 2007.

This marked the last Wimbledon appearance of 1996 champion Richard Krajicek, reaching the quarterfinals before losing to Xavier Malisse.

== Seeds ==
1. (Australia) Lleyton Hewitt (champion)
2. (Russia) Marat Safin (second round)
3. (United States) Andre Agassi (second round)
4. (United Kingdom) Tim Henman (semifinals)
5. (Russia) Yevgeny Kafelnikov (third round)
6. (United States) Pete Sampras (second round)
7. (Switzerland) Roger Federer (first round)
8. (Sweden) Thomas Johansson (first round)
9. (Spain) Juan Carlos Ferrero (second round)
10. (Argentina) Guillermo Cañas (second round)
11. (United States) Andy Roddick (third round)
12. (Czech Republic) Jiří Novák (second round)
13. (Morocco) Younes El Aynaoui (first round)
14. (Sweden) Thomas Enqvist (second round)
15. (Romania) Andrei Pavel (third round)
16. (France) Nicolas Escudé (third round)

17. (Germany) Rainer Schüttler (third round)
18. (Netherlands) Sjeng Schalken (quarterfinals)
19. (Argentina) Juan Ignacio Chela (first round)
20. (Spain) Tommy Robredo (first round)
21. (Belarus) Max Mirnyi (first round)
22. (Ecuador) Nicolás Lapentti (quarterfinals)
23. (United Kingdom) Greg Rusedski (fourth round)
24. (Argentina) Gastón Gaudio (second round)
25. (France) Fabrice Santoro (second round)
26. (United States) Todd Martin (second round)
27. (Belgium) Xavier Malisse (semifinals)
28. (Argentina) David Nalbandian (final)
29. (United States) James Blake (second round)
30. (Croatia) Ivan Ljubičić (second round)
31. (Austria) Stefan Koubek (second round)
32. (Finland) Jarkko Nieminen (second round)

Click on the seed number of a player to go to their draw section.

The original #5 seed Tommy Haas withdrew for personal reasons before the tournament draw was made. All original seeds from 6-32 moved up one place, and a new #32 seed was added.

== Draw ==
=== Key ===
- Q = Qualifier
- WC = Wild card
- LL = Lucky loser
- Alt = Alternate
- ITF = ITF entry
- PR = Protected ranking
- SR = Special ranking
- SE = Special exempt
- JE = Junior exempt
- JR = Junior Accelerator Programme entrant
- CO = College Accelerator Programme entrant
- NG = Next Gen Accelerator Program entrant
- w/o = Walkover
- r = Retired
- d = Defaulted

=== Finals ===
Quarterfinals
1	(Australia) Lleyton Hewitt	6	6	6^{5}	1	7
18	(Netherlands) Sjeng Schalken	2	2	7^{7}	6	5
4	(United Kingdom) Tim Henman	6	5	6	6
(Brazil) André Sá	3	7	4	3
27	(Belgium) Xavier Malisse	6	4	6	3	9
PR	(Netherlands) Richard Krajicek	1	6	2	6	7
28	(Argentina) David Nalbandian	6	6	4	4	6
22	(Ecuador) Nicolás Lapentti	4	4	6	6	4

Semifinals
1	(Australia) Lleyton Hewitt	7	6	7
4	(United Kingdom) Tim Henman	5	1	5
27	(Belgium) Xavier Malisse	6^{2}	4	6	6	2
28	(Argentina) David Nalbandian	7^{7}	6	1	2	6

Final
1	(Australia) Lleyton Hewitt	6	6	6
28	(Argentina) David Nalbandian	1	3	2

=== Top half ===
==== Section 1 ====
First round
1	(Australia) L Hewitt	6	7	6
(Sweden) J Björkman	4	5	1
Q	(France) G Carraz	6	6	6^{5}	7
(Philippines) C Mamiit	2	4	7^{7}	5
(Austria) J Knowle	3	6	6	3	6
(France) M Llodra	6	4	3	6	3
WC	(United Kingdom) A Mackin	6^{5}	3	3
32	(Finland) J Nieminen	7^{7}	6	6
24	(Argentina) G Gaudio	6	6	6
Q	(Argentina) JP Guzmán	3	4	3
LL	(United States) B Vahaly	3	6	3	2
(Russia) M Youzhny	6	1	6	6
(Argentina) J Acasuso	3	6^{4}	1
(Switzerland) M Rosset	6	7^{7}	6
WC	(United Kingdom) A Bogdanovic	6	4	4	4
16	(France) N Escudé	4	6	6	6

Second round
1	(Australia) L Hewitt	6	7^{7}	6
Q	(France) G Carraz	4	6^{5}	2
(Austria) J Knowle	6	6	6
32	(Finland) J Nieminen	3	4	3
24	(Argentina) G Gaudio	0	6	6^{2}	7	4
(Russia) M Youzhny	6	1	7^{7}	5	6
(Switzerland) M Rosset	2	7	5	4
16	(France) N Escudé	6	5	7	6

Third round
1	(Australia) L Hewitt	6	6	6
(Austria) J Knowle	2	1	3
(Russia) M Youzhny	6	1	6	6
16	(France) N Escudé	2	6	3	3

Fourth round
1	(Australia) L Hewitt	6	6	7
(Russia) M Youzhny	3	3	5

==== Section 2 ====
First round
9	(Spain) JC Ferrero	6^{5}	6	6	6
(South Africa) N Godwin	7^{7}	3	3	3
(Israel) N Okun	3	6^{3}	2
LL	(United States) J Morrison	6	7^{7}	6
(United States) M Chang	6	7^{7}	6
(Germany) L Burgsmüller	3	6^{4}	4
(Denmark) K Pless	3	3	5
18	(Netherlands) S Schalken	6	6	7
25	(France) F Santoro	2	7^{7}	6	4	6
(Argentina) A Calleri	6	6^{4}	4	6	3
(France) N Coutelot	6^{4}	1	3
(Romania) A Voinea	7^{7}	6	6
(France) J Golmard	2	6^{6}	2^{r}
(Czech Republic) J Vacek	6	7^{8}	3
Q	(Croatia) M Ančić	6	7^{7}	6
7	(Switzerland) R Federer	3	6^{2}	3

Second round
9	(Spain) JC Ferrero	3	5	6^{5}
LL	(United States) J Morrison	6	7	7^{7}
(United States) M Chang	6^{2}	3	6	1
18	(Netherlands) S Schalken	7^{7}	6	4	6
25	(France) F Santoro	2	4	6	3
(Romania) A Voinea	6	6	3	6
(Czech Republic) J Vacek	6	6	7
Q	(Croatia) M Ančić	4	4	5

Third round
LL	(United States) J Morrison	4	6^{7}	0
18	(Netherlands) S Schalken	6	7^{9}	6
(Romania) A Voinea	1	6	3	4
(Czech Republic) J Vacek	6	4	6	6

Fourth round
18	(Netherlands) S Schalken	6	7	7
(Czech Republic) J Vacek	2	5	5

==== Section 3 ====
First round
4	(United Kingdom) T Henman	6	6	6
Q	(France) J-F Bachelot	1	3	2
Q	(Italy) C Caratti	3	6	4	5
Q	(Australia) S Draper	6	4	6	7
(Spain) A Portas	6^{5}	3	7^{7}	3
(South Africa) W Ferreira	7^{7}	6	6^{4}	6
(Paraguay) R Delgado	2	4	5
30	(Croatia) I Ljubičić	6	6	7
20	(Spain) T Robredo	1	4	4
(Netherlands) R Sluiter	6	6	6
Q	(Czech Republic) R Štěpánek	7	6	7^{7}
Q	(France) C Saulnier	5	2	6^{5}
(Russia) N Davydenko	4	2	4
(Switzerland) M Kratochvil	6	6	6
(Georgia (country)) I Labadze	4	7^{7}	6	7^{7}
13	(Morocco) Y El Aynaoui	6	6^{4}	3	6^{2}

Second round
4	(United Kingdom) T Henman	3	6	6	6
Q	(Australia) S Draper	6	3	4	3
(South Africa) W Ferreira	6	6	3	4	6
30	(Croatia) I Ljubičić	4	4	6	6	3
(Netherlands) R Sluiter	3	7^{7}	3	3
Q	(Czech Republic) R Štěpánek	6	6^{5}	6	6
(Switzerland) M Kratochvil	3	6	7^{7}	7^{7}
(Georgia (country)) I Labadze	6	0	6^{4}	6^{5}

Third round
4	(United Kingdom) T Henman	7^{8}	3	7^{10}	6
(South Africa) W Ferreira	6^{6}	6	6^{8}	1
Q	(Czech Republic) R Štěpánek	2	3	3
(Switzerland) M Kratochvil	6	6	6

Fourth round
4	(United Kingdom) T Henman	7^{7}	6^{2}	4	6	6
(Switzerland) M Kratochvil	6^{5}	7^{7}	6	3	2

==== Section 4 ====
First round
10	(Argentina) G Cañas	7	6	6
(Germany) M Kohlmann	5	4	4
(Spain) F López	6	3	4	7^{7}	11
Q	(Greece) K Economidis	3	6	6	6^{2}	9
(Spain) F Vicente	6	6^{3}	3	2
(Armenia) S Sargsian	4	7^{7}	6	6
(Morocco) H Arazi	6^{3}	4	4
17	(Germany) R Schüttler	7^{7}	6	6
31	(Austria) S Koubek	6	3	6	4	6
Q	(South Africa) J Bower	3	6	2	6	3
(France) A Dupuis	3	6	4	7	3
(Brazil) A Sá	6	4	6	5	6
Q	(Germany) A Waske	7^{7}	7^{7}	6^{2}	6
(Italy) A Gaudenzi	6^{4}	6^{3}	7^{7}	1
(Brazil) F Saretta	6^{2}	6	7^{7}	3	12
8	(Sweden) T Johansson	7^{7}	4	6^{4}	6	10

Second round
10	(Argentina) G Cañas	6	6	6^{7}	5	8
(Spain) F López	4	2	7^{9}	7	10
(Armenia) S Sargsian	3	0	1
17	(Germany) R Schüttler	6	6	6
31	(Austria) S Koubek	6	6^{3}	5	3
(Brazil) A Sá	3	7^{7}	7	6
Q	(Germany) A Waske	7^{7}	4	4	5
(Brazil) F Saretta	6^{4}	6	6	7

Third round
(Spain) F López	3	7^{9}	6	6
17	(Germany) R Schüttler	6	6^{7}	4	4
(Brazil) A Sá	2	6	6	1	6
(Brazil) F Saretta	6	4	3	6	1

Fourth round
(Spain) F López	3	5	6	3
(Brazil) A Sá	6	7	4	6

=== Bottom half ===
==== Section 5 ====
First round
5	(Russia) Y Kafelnikov	6	7^{7}	7^{9}
(Slovakia) D Hrbatý	1	6^{4}	6^{7}
Q	(France) N Thomann	6	7^{7}	3	4	11
(Austria) M Hipfl	1	6^{3}	6	6	9
(United States) V Spadea	3	7^{7}	6^{2}	6	6
(Sweden) M Larsson	6	6^{4}	7^{7}	4	1
(Spain) G Blanco	3	3	3
27	(Belgium) X Malisse	6	6	6
23	(United Kingdom) G Rusedski	6	6	7
Q	(Austria) J Melzer	1	4	5
Q	(South Korea) H-t Lee	6	6	4	4	6
(Russia) A Stoliarov	3	2	6	6	2
(Spain) A Martín	6	7^{7}	6
(Italy) S Galvani	4	6^{3}	4
(Czech Republic) B Ulihrach	1	1^{r}
11	(United States) A Roddick	6	3

Second round
5	(Russia) Y Kafelnikov	7^{10}	6	6
Q	(France) N Thomann	6^{8}	2	2
(United States) V Spadea	5	2	2
27	(Belgium) X Malisse	7	6	6
23	(United Kingdom) G Rusedski	6	6	5	6
Q	(South Korea) H-t Lee	1	4	7	2
(Spain) A Martín	1	2	2
11	(United States) A Roddick	6	6	6

Third round
5	(Russia) Y Kafelnikov	6^{4}	5	1
27	(Belgium) X Malisse	7^{7}	7	6
23	(United Kingdom) G Rusedski	6	6	6
11	(United States) A Roddick	3	4	2

Fourth round
27	(Belgium) X Malisse	3	6	3	6	6
23	(United Kingdom) G Rusedski	6	3	6	3	4

==== Section 6 ====
First round
14	(Sweden) T Enqvist	6	6	6
WC	(United Kingdom) A Parmar	1	4	4
WC	(Australia) M Philippoussis	6	3	6	6
(France) J Boutter	3	6	1	2
(Spain) J Balcells	3	6	7	5	3
(Germany) N Kiefer	6	2	5	7	6
(Chile) F González	6	3	1	7	6
19	(Argentina) JI Chela	3	6	6	5	3
29	(United States) J Blake	6	6	0
(Argentina) M Zabaleta	2	2	0^{r}
PR	(Netherlands) R Krajicek	6	7	7^{7}
(Argentina) F Squillari	2	5	6^{5}
(Thailand) P Srichaphan	6	6	3	5	6
Q	(United States) J Brasington	4	3	6	7	4
(Israel) H Levy	0	4	4
3	(United States) A Agassi	6	6	6

Second round
14	(Sweden) T Enqvist	5	3	4
WC	(Australia) M Philippoussis	7	6	6
(Germany) N Kiefer	7	6	6
(Chile) F González	5	3	0
29	(United States) J Blake	3	4	6	6	9
PR	(Netherlands) R Krajicek	6	6	3	4	11
(Thailand) P Srichaphan	6	7^{7}	6
3	(United States) A Agassi	4	6^{5}	2

Third round
WC	(Australia) M Philippoussis	3	6	6	6
(Germany) N Kiefer	6	3	4	2
PR	(Netherlands) R Krajicek	7^{7}	6	6
(Thailand) P Srichaphan	6^{5}	4	2

Fourth round
WC	(Australia) M Philippoussis	7^{7}	6^{4}	7^{7}	6^{5}	4
PR	(Netherlands) R Krajicek	6^{2}	7^{7}	6^{1}	7^{7}	6

==== Section 7 ====
First round
6	(United States) P Sampras	6	7^{7}	6
(United Kingdom) M Lee	3	6^{1}	3
LL	(Switzerland) G Bastl	6	6	7^{7}
LL	(Russia) D Golovanov	4	2	6^{5}
WC	(France) P-H Mathieu	6	7	6
(Spain) F Clavet	4	5	3
(Spain) D Sánchez	4	3	6	5
28	(Argentina) D Nalbandian	6	6	4	7
21	(Belarus) M Mirnyi	6	4	6^{3}	4
(United States) T Dent	4	6	7^{7}	6
(Chile) N Massú	3	6^{9}	3
(United States) J-M Gambill	6	7^{11}	6
(United States) M Russell	4	4	3
(Australia) W Arthurs	6	6	6
(Brazil) F Meligeni	6	0	4	4
12	(Czech Republic) J Novák	2	6	6	6

Second round
6	(United States) P Sampras	3	2	6	6	4
LL	(Switzerland) G Bastl	6	6	4	3	6
WC	(France) P-H Mathieu	6^{3}	6^{7}	3
28	(Argentina) D Nalbandian	7^{7}	7^{9}	6
(United States) T Dent	6	7	7^{7}
(United States) J-M Gambill	4	5	6^{4}
(Australia) W Arthurs	6	7^{11}	6
12	(Czech Republic) J Novák	3	6^{9}	3

Third round
LL	(Switzerland) G Bastl	2	2	2
28	(Argentina) D Nalbandian	6	6	6
(United States) T Dent	6^{2}	6^{3}	7^{7}	6^{5}
(Australia) W Arthurs	7^{7}	7^{7}	6^{4}	7^{7}

Fourth round
28	(Argentina) D Nalbandian	6	7^{7}	2	7^{9}
(Australia) W Arthurs	4	6^{4}	6	6^{7}

==== Section 8 ====
First round
15	(Romania) A Pavel	6	6	3	6
(Denmark) K Carlsen	4	1	6	3
(Brazil) A Simoni	7^{7}	6	6^{5}	2	2
Q	(Slovakia) K Beck	6^{3}	4	7^{7}	6	6
WC	(United Kingdom) B Cowan	6^{3}	6	6	6
(Hungary) A Sávolt	7^{7}	3	3	3
WC	(United Kingdom) J Delgado	3	2	7^{8}	6	5
22	(Ecuador) N Lapentti	6	6	6^{6}	4	7
26	(United States) T Martin	6	6	7^{7}
(Italy) D Sanguinetti	3	4	6^{1}
(France) A Clément	6	6	6
(Spain) A Montañés	3	4	0
(Belgium) C Rochus	2	6	6^{6}	0
(Belgium) O Rochus	6	3	7^{8}	6
(France) C Pioline	6^{7}	2	3
2	(Russia) M Safin	7^{9}	6	6

Second round
15	(Romania) A Pavel	3	6	7^{7}	6
Q	(Slovakia) K Beck	6	1	6^{2}	4
WC	(United Kingdom) B Cowan	6	4	3	2
22	(Ecuador) N Lapentti	4	6	6	6
26	(United States) T Martin	3	4	6^{2}
(France) A Clément	6	6	7^{7}
(Belgium) O Rochus	6	6	3	7^{7}
2	(Russia) M Safin	2	4	6	6^{1}

Third round
15	(Romania) A Pavel	6	6	6^{2}	4	2
22	(Ecuador) N Lapentti	3	3	7^{7}	6	6
(France) A Clément	6	7	6
(Belgium) O Rochus	0	5	3

Fourth round
22	(Ecuador) N Lapentti	3	7	2	7	6
(France) A Clément	6	5	6	5	3

Preceded by 2002 French Open – Men's singles	Grand Slam men's singles	Succeeded by 2002 US Open – Men's singles
