= 2002 Wimbledon Championships – Men's doubles =

Men's doubles
- 2002 Wimbledon Championships

Final
- Champions: (Sweden) Jonas Björkman (Australia) Todd Woodbridge
- Runners-up: (The Bahamas) Mark Knowles (Canada) Daniel Nestor
- Score: 6–1, 6–2, 6–7^{(7–9)}, 7–5

Details
- Draw: 64 (4 Q / 6 WC )
- Seeds: 16

Events
| Singles | men | women | | boys | girls |
| Doubles | men | women | mixed | boys | girls |
| WC Singles | men | women | quad |
| WC Doubles | men | women | quad |
| Legends | men | women | seniors |
| ← 2001 · | Wimbledon Championships | · 2003 → |

Donald Johnson and Jared Palmer were the defending champions, but lost in the semifinals to Jonas Björkman and Todd Woodbridge.

Björkman and Woodbridge defeated Mark Knowles and Daniel Nestor in the final, 6–1, 6–2, 6–7^{(7–9)}, 7–5, to win the gentlemen's doubles title at the 2002 Wimbledon Championships

== Seeds ==
1. (United States) Donald Johnson / (United States) Jared Palmer (semifinals)
2. (The Bahamas) Mark Knowles / (Canada) Daniel Nestor (final)
3. (India) Mahesh Bhupathi / (Belarus) Max Mirnyi (quarterfinals)
4. (Zimbabwe) Wayne Black / (Zimbabwe) Kevin Ullyett (second round)
5. (Sweden) Jonas Björkman / (Australia) Todd Woodbridge (champions)
6. (United States) Bob Bryan / (United States) Mike Bryan (semifinals)
7. (Czech Republic) Martin Damm / (Czech Republic) Cyril Suk (quarterfinals)
8. (Germany) David Prinosil / (Czech Republic) David Rikl (quarterfinals)
9. (Netherlands) Paul Haarhuis / (Russia) Yevgeny Kafelnikov (third round)
10. (Czech Republic) Jiří Novák / (Czech Republic) Radek Štěpánek (second round)
11. (South Africa) Ellis Ferreira / (United States) Rick Leach (second round)
12. (Australia) Joshua Eagle / (Australia) Sandon Stolle (third round)
13. (France) Michaël Llodra / (France) Fabrice Santoro (first round, retired)
14. (France) Julien Boutter / (Netherlands) Sjeng Schalken (third round)
15. (United States) Brian MacPhie / (Federal Republic of Yugoslavia) Nenad Zimonjić (third round)
16. (Argentina) Lucas Arnold Ker / (Argentina) Gastón Etlis (first round)

Click on the seed number of a player to go to their draw section.

== Draw ==
=== Key ===
- Q = Qualifier
- WC = Wild card
- LL = Lucky loser
- Alt = Alternate
- ITF = ITF entry
- PR = Protected ranking
- SR = Special ranking
- SE = Special exempt
- JE = Junior exempt
- JR = Junior Accelerator Programme entrant
- CO = College Accelerator Programme entrant
- NG = Next Gen Accelerator Program entrant
- w/o = Walkover
- r = Retired
- d = Defaulted

=== Finals ===
Quarterfinals
1 | (United States) Donald Johnson (United States) Jared Palmer | 7^{7} | 6 | 6
7 | (Czech Republic) Martin Damm (Czech Republic) Cyril Suk | 6^{2} | 4 | 4
3 | (India) Mahesh Bhupathi (Belarus) Max Mirnyi | 2 | 3 | 4
5 | (Sweden) Jonas Björkman (Australia) Todd Woodbridge | 6 | 6 | 6
6 | (United States) Bob Bryan (United States) Mike Bryan | 7^{8} | 7 | 3 | 6
(Australia) Andrew Florent (Australia) David Macpherson | 6^{6} | 5 | 6 | 0
8 | (Germany) David Prinosil (Czech Republic) David Rikl | 7^{7} | 4 | 4 | 2
2 | (The Bahamas) Mark Knowles (Canada) Daniel Nestor | 6^{1} | 6 | 6 | 6

Semifinals
1 | (United States) Donald Johnson (United States) Jared Palmer | 5 | 6 | 7^{7} | 5 | 2
5 | (Sweden) Jonas Björkman (Australia) Todd Woodbridge | 7 | 4 | 6^{3} | 7 | 6
6 | (United States) Bob Bryan (United States) Mike Bryan | 6^{4} | 6^{5} | 6^{4}
2 | (The Bahamas) Mark Knowles (Canada) Daniel Nestor | 7^{7} | 7^{7} | 7^{7}

Final
5 | (Sweden) Jonas Björkman (Australia) Todd Woodbridge | 6 | 6 | 6^{7} | 7
2 | (The Bahamas) Mark Knowles (Canada) Daniel Nestor | 1 | 2 | 7^{9} | 5

=== Top half ===
==== Section 1 ====
First round
1 | (United States) D Johnson (United States) J Palmer | 6 | 6 | 3 | 7^{7}
Q | (Slovakia) K Beck (Czech Republic) J Levinský | 0 | 2 | 6 | 6^{2}
(Israel) J Elrich (Argentina) D Orsanic | 3 | 6^{5} | 3
(Germany) K Braasch (Germany) R Schüttler | 6 | 7^{7} | 6
WC | (United Kingdom) J Marray (United Kingdom) D Sherwood | 6 | 4 | 4 | 4
Q | (Germany) A Waske (Croatia) L Zovko | 4 | 6 | 6 | 6
(South Africa) N Godwin (Belarus) V Voltchkov | 7 | 6 | 7
16 | (Argentina) L Arnold Ker (Argentina) G Etlis | 5 | 4 | 5
11 | (South Africa) E Ferreira (United States) R Leach | 6 | 4 | 7^{7} | 6
WC | (United Kingdom) L Childs (United Kingdom) M Hilton | 2 | 6 | 6^{3} | 1
Q | (Israel) A Hadad (Pakistan) A-u-H Qureshi | 7 | 7^{7} | 7^{7}
(Argentina) M Rodríguez (Belgium) T Vanhoudt | 5 | 6^{5} | 6^{2}
(Austria) J Knowle (Germany) M Kohlmann | 6 | 6 | 7^{7}
(United States) J Gimelstob (Japan) T Shimada | 4 | 2 | 6^{5}
(Romania) A Pavel (United States) J Tarango | 3 | 6 | 1 | 5
7 | (Czech Republic) M Damm (Czech Republic) C Suk | 6 | 4 | 6 | 7

Second round
1 | (United States) D Johnson (United States) J Palmer | 7^{7} | 7^{7} | 6
(Germany) K Braasch (Germany) R Schüttler | 6^{1} | 6^{4} | 3
Q | (Germany) A Waske (Croatia) L Zovko | 5 | 6^{4} | 6^{3}
(South Africa) N Godwin (Belarus) V Voltchkov | 7 | 7^{7} | 7^{7}
11 | (South Africa) E Ferreira (United States) R Leach | 4 | 4 | 4
Q | (Israel) A Hadad (Pakistan) A-u-H Qureshi | 6 | 6 | 6
(Austria) J Knowle (Germany) M Kohlmann | 4 | 4 | 7^{7} | 3
7 | (Czech Republic) M Damm (Czech Republic) C Suk | 6 | 6 | 6^{2} | 6

Third round
1 | (United States) D Johnson (United States) J Palmer | 7^{7} | 6 | 6
(South Africa) N Godwin (Belarus) V Voltchkov | 6^{2} | 4 | 3
Q | (Israel) A Hadad (Pakistan) A-u-H Qureshi | 1 | 6^{5} | 4
7 | (Czech Republic) M Damm (Czech Republic) C Suk | 6 | 7^{7} | 6

Quarterfinals
1 | (United States) D Johnson (United States) J Palmer | 7^{7} | 6 | 6
7 | (Czech Republic) M Damm (Czech Republic) C Suk | 6^{2} | 4 | 4

==== Section 2 ====
First round
3 | (India) M Bhupathi (Belarus) M Mirnyi | 6 | 6 | 7
(United States) M Fish (United States) J Morrison | 4 | 4 | 5
WC | (United Kingdom) L Milligan (United Kingdom) K Spencer | 6^{4} | 6^{7} | 6 | 3
(Australia) T Crichton (The Bahamas) M Merklein | 7^{7} | 7^{9} | 4 | 6
(Sweden) S Aspelin (Spain) J Balcells | 7^{7} | 5 | 4 | 5
LL | (Australia) D Petrovic (Czech Republic) D Škoch | 6^{4} | 7 | 6 | 7
(Italy) M Bertolini (Italy) C Brandi | 4 | 7 | 2 | 3
14 | (France) J Boutter (Netherlands) S Schalken | 6 | 5 | 6 | 6
12 | (Australia) J Eagle (Australia) S Stolle | 6 | 6 | 6
Q | (United States) R Kendrick (Netherlands) R Wassen | 2 | 4 | 3
(Australia) M Hill (Czech Republic) D Vacek | 6^{4} | 3 | 6 | 1
(South Africa) D Adams (South Africa) W Ferreira | 7^{7} | 6 | 3 | 6
(Argentina) M García (Argentina) L Lobo | 7^{7} | 7^{7} | 4 | 6^{5} | 6
WC | (Spain) JC Ferrero (Spain) T Robredo | 6^{5} | 6^{5} | 6 | 7^{7} | 4
(United States) D Bowen (Australia) A Fisher | 3 | 4 | 4
5 | (Sweden) J Björkman (Australia) T Woodbridge | 6 | 6 | 6

Second round
3 | (India) M Bhupathi (Belarus) M Mirnyi | 7^{7} | 6 | 6
(Australia) T Crichton (The Bahamas) M Merklein | 6^{4} | 4 | 3
LL | (Australia) D Petrovic (Czech Republic) D Škoch | 4 | 4 | 5
14 | (France) J Boutter (Netherlands) S Schalken | 6 | 6 | 7
12 | (Australia) J Eagle (Australia) S Stolle | 6 | 6 | 7^{7}
(South Africa) D Adams (South Africa) W Ferreira | 3 | 1 | 6^{0}
(Argentina) M García (Argentina) L Lobo | 1 | 6 | 6^{5} | 3
5 | (Sweden) J Björkman (Australia) T Woodbridge | 6 | 3 | 7^{7} | 6

Third round
3 | (India) M Bhupathi (Belarus) M Mirnyi | 6 | 7^{7} | 6
14 | (France) J Boutter (Netherlands) S Schalken | 1 | 6^{3} | 4
12 | (Australia) J Eagle (Australia) S Stolle | 1 | 6^{1} | 3
5 | (Sweden) J Björkman (Australia) T Woodbridge | 6 | 7^{7} | 6

Quarterfinals
3 | (India) M Bhupathi (Belarus) M Mirnyi | 2 | 3 | 4
5 | (Sweden) J Björkman (Australia) T Woodbridge | 6 | 6 | 6

=== Bottom half ===
==== Section 3 ====
First round
6 | (United States) B Bryan (United States) M Bryan | 7^{7} | 6 | 6^{3} | 6
(Australia) B Ellwood (Australia) N Healey | 6^{3} | 3 | 7^{7} | 4
(United States) S Humphries (Russia) A Olhovskiy | 7^{7} | 3 | 6^{9} | 7^{10} | 6
(Switzerland) G Bastl (Czech Republic) P Luxa | 6^{5} | 6 | 7^{11} | 6^{8} | 3
(Argentina) M Hood (Brazil) D Melo | 7^{9} | 3 | 6^{6} | 6^{7}
(United States) J-M Gambill (United States) G Oliver | 6^{7} | 6 | 7^{8} | 7^{9}
(South Africa) P Rosner (United States) G Weiner | 6^{4} | 6^{6} | 7^{7} | 4
10 | (Czech Republic) J Novák (Czech Republic) R Štěpánek | 7^{7} | 7^{8} | 6^{2} | 6
15 | (United States) B MacPhie (Federal Republic of Yugoslavia) N Zimonjić | 7^{7} | 6 | 6
(Australia) J Kerr (Australia) G Silcock | 6^{4} | 3 | 4
(Zimbabwe) B Black (South Africa) R Koenig | 6 | 6 | 5 | 4 | 7
(Australia) S Huss (India) L Paes | 4 | 4 | 7 | 6 | 5
(Australia) A Florent (Australia) D Macpherson | 6 | 6 | 3 | 4 | 6
WC | (United Kingdom) M Lee (United Kingdom) A Parmar | 3 | 4 | 6 | 6 | 3
WC | (United Kingdom) B Cowan (United Kingdom) J Delgado | 3 | 4 | 4
4 | (Zimbabwe) W Black (Zimbabwe) K Ullyett | 6 | 6 | 6

Second round
6 | (United States) B Bryan (United States) M Bryan | 7 | 6 | 7
(United States) S Humphries (Russia) A Olhovskiy | 5 | 3 | 5
(United States) J-M Gambill (United States) G Oliver | 6^{6} | 7^{7} | 6 | 7^{7}
10 | (Czech Republic) J Novák (Czech Republic) R Štěpánek | 7^{8} | 6^{4} | 4 | 6^{5}
15 | (United States) B MacPhie (Federal Republic of Yugoslavia) N Zimonjić | 7^{7} | 6^{4} | 7 | 2 | 6
(Zimbabwe) B Black (South Africa) R Koenig | 6^{4} | 7^{7} | 5 | 6 | 4
(Australia) A Florent (Australia) D Macpherson | 6 | 7 | 7^{7}
4 | (Zimbabwe) W Black (Zimbabwe) K Ullyett | 4 | 5 | 6^{4}

Third round
6 | (United States) B Bryan (United States) M Bryan | 6^{8} | 6 | 6 | 2 | 6
(United States) J-M Gambill (United States) G Oliver | 7^{10} | 4 | 2 | 6 | 1
15 | (United States) B MacPhie (Federal Republic of Yugoslavia) N Zimonjić | 6^{5} | 2 | 6^{2}
(Australia) A Florent (Australia) D Macpherson | 7^{7} | 6 | 7^{7}

Quarterfinals
6 | (United States) B Bryan (United States) M Bryan | 7^{8} | 7 | 3 | 6
(Australia) A Florent (Australia) D Macpherson | 6^{6} | 5 | 6 | 0

==== Section 4 ====
First round
8 | (Germany) D Prinosil (Czech Republic) D Rikl | 6 | 6 | 4 | 6
(Germany) M-K Goellner (Australia) T Perry | 3 | 1 | 6 | 1
(Australia) W Arthurs (Australia) P Hanley | 6^{10} | 6^{4} | 6^{5}
(South Africa) C Haggard (Romania) G Trifu | 7^{12} | 7^{7} | 7^{7}
(South Africa) M Barnard (South Africa) M Wakefield | 6^{5} | 6 | 6 | 6
(Czech Republic) F Čermák (Czech Republic) O Fukárek | 7^{7} | 3 | 1 | 1
(Czech Republic) P Pála (Czech Republic) P Vízner | 7^{7} | 1 | 3 | 6 | 3
9 | (Netherlands) P Haarhuis (Russia) Y Kafelnikov | 6^{5} | 6 | 6 | 3 | 6
13 | (France) M Llodra (France) F Santoro | 6 | 1^{r}
(South Africa) J Coetzee (South Africa) J-L de Jager | 3 | 4
(United States) J Blake (Australia) A Kratzmann | 7^{7} | 6 | 6
(North Macedonia) A Kitinov (Sweden) J Landsberg | 6^{2} | 3 | 4
(Argentina) S Roitman (Argentina) A Schneiter | 3 | 1 | 5
(Czech Republic) T Cibulec (Czech Republic) L Friedl | 6 | 6 | 7
(Brazil) A Sá (United States) J Thomas | 7^{7} | 1 | 6 | 2 | 2
2 | (The Bahamas) M Knowles (Canada) D Nestor | 6^{4} | 6 | 3 | 6 | 6

Second round
8 | (Germany) D Prinosil (Czech Republic) D Rikl | 7 | 6 | 6^{9} | 7
(South Africa) C Haggard (Romania) G Trifu | 5 | 3 | 7^{11} | 5
(South Africa) M Barnard (South Africa) M Wakefield | 5 | 3 | 1
9 | (Netherlands) P Haarhuis (Russia) Y Kafelnikov | 7 | 6 | 6
(South Africa) J Coetzee (South Africa) J-L de Jager | 5 | 3 | 4
(United States) J Blake (Australia) A Kratzmann | 7 | 6 | 6
(Czech Republic) T Cibulec (Czech Republic) L Friedl | 3 | 4 | 6 | 1
2 | (The Bahamas) M Knowles (Canada) D Nestor | 6 | 6 | 3 | 6

Third round
8 | (Germany) D Prinosil (Czech Republic) D Rikl | 6 | 7 | 7
9 | (Netherlands) P Haarhuis (Russia) Y Kafelnikov | 3 | 5 | 5
(United States) J Blake (Australia) A Kratzmann | 4 | 4 | 4
2 | (The Bahamas) M Knowles (Canada) D Nestor | 6 | 6 | 6

Quarterfinals
8 | (Germany) D Prinosil (Czech Republic) D Rikl | 7^{7} | 4 | 4 | 2
2 | (The Bahamas) M Knowles (Canada) D Nestor | 6^{1} | 6 | 6 | 6
