= 2002 Wimbledon Championships =

- Date: 24 June – 7 July
- Edition: 116th
- Category: Grand Slam (ITF)
- Draw: 128S/64D/64XD
- Prize money: £8,825,320
- Surface: Grass
- Location: Church Road; SW19, Wimbledon, London, United Kingdom
- Venue: All England Lawn Tennis and Croquet Club

Champions

Men's singles
- (Australia) Lleyton Hewitt

Women's singles
- (United States) Serena Williams

Men's doubles
- (Sweden) Jonas Björkman / (Australia) Todd Woodbridge

Women's doubles
- (United States) Serena Williams / (United States) Venus Williams

Mixed doubles
- (India) Mahesh Bhupathi / (Russia) Elena Likhovtseva

Boys' singles
- (Australia) Todd Reid

Girls' singles
- (Russia) Vera Dushevina

Boys' doubles
- (Romania) Florin Mergea / (Romania) Horia Tecău

Girls' doubles
- (Belgium) Elke Clijsters / (Czech Republic) Barbora Strýcová
← 2001 ·	Wimbledon Championships	· 2003 →

The 2002 Wimbledon Championships was a tennis tournament played on grass courts at the All England Lawn Tennis and Croquet Club in Wimbledon, London in the United Kingdom. It was the 116th edition of the Wimbledon Championships and were held from 24 June to 7 July 2002. It was the third Grand Slam tennis event of the year.

Goran Ivanišević did not defend his title this year. Lleyton Hewitt, the World No.1, defeated David Nalbandian in the final in straight sets to win his second Grand Slam title and first Wimbledon title. He became the first Australian since Pat Cash in 1987 to win Wimbledon. Venus Williams was unsuccessful in her title defence, being defeated in the final by her younger sister Serena in the women's final.

== Prize money ==
The total prize money for 2002 championships was £8,825,320. The winner of the men's title earned £525,000 while the women's singles champion earned £486,000.

Event	W	F	SF	QF	Round of 16	Round of 32	Round of 64	Round of 128
Men's singles	£525,000							
Women's singles	£486,000							
Men's doubles *	£210,000							—
Women's doubles *	£194,250							—
Mixed doubles *	£88,500							—

_{* per team}

== Champions ==
=== Seniors ===
==== Men's singles ====
(Australia) Lleyton Hewitt defeated (Argentina) David Nalbandian, 6–1, 6–3, 6–2

- It was Hewitt's 4th title of the year, and his 16th overall. It was his 2nd career Grand Slam title, and his 1st Wimbledon title.

==== Women's singles ====
(United States) Serena Williams defeated (United States) Venus Williams, 7–6^{(7–4)}, 6–3

- It was Serena's 5th title of the year, and her 16th overall. It was her 3rd career Grand Slam title, and her 1st Wimbledon title.

==== Men's doubles ====
(Sweden) Jonas Björkman / (Australia) Todd Woodbridge defeated (The Bahamas) Mark Knowles / (Canada) Daniel Nestor, 6–1, 6–2, 6–7^{(7–9)}, 7–5

==== Women's doubles ====
(United States) Serena Williams / (United States) Venus Williams defeated (Spain) Virginia Ruano Pascual / (Argentina) Paola Suárez, 6–2, 7–5

==== Mixed doubles ====
(India) Mahesh Bhupathi / (Russia) Elena Likhovtseva defeated (Zimbabwe) Kevin Ullyett / (Slovakia) Daniela Hantuchová, 6–2, 1–6, 6–1

=== Juniors ===
==== Boys' singles ====
(Australia) Todd Reid defeated (Algeria) Lamine Ouahab, 7–6^{(7–5)}, 6–4

==== Girls' singles ====
(Russia) Vera Dushevina defeated (Russia) Maria Sharapova, 4–6, 6–1, 6–2

==== Boys' doubles ====
(Romania) Florin Mergea / (Romania) Horia Tecău defeated (United States) Brian Baker / (United States) Rajeev Ram, 6–4, 4–6, 6–4

==== Girls' doubles ====
(Belgium) Elke Clijsters / (Czech Republic) Barbora Strýcová defeated (United States) Ally Baker / (Germany) Anna-Lena Grönefeld, 6–4, 5–7, 8–6

== Singles seeds ==
=== Men's singles ===
1. (Australia) Lleyton Hewitt (champion)
2. (Russia) Marat Safin (second round, lost to Olivier Rochus)
3. (United States) Andre Agassi (second round, lost to Paradorn Srichaphan)
4. (United Kingdom) Tim Henman (semifinals, lost to Lleyton Hewitt)
5. (Russia) Yevgeny Kafelnikov (third round, lost to Xavier Malisse)
6. (United States) Pete Sampras (second round, lost to George Bastl)
7. (Switzerland) Roger Federer (first round, lost to Mario Ančić)
8. (Sweden) Thomas Johansson (first round, lost to Flávio Saretta)
9. (Spain) Juan Carlos Ferrero (second round, lost to Jeff Morrison)
10. (Argentina) Guillermo Cañas (second round, lost to Feliciano López)
11. (United States) Andy Roddick (third round, lost to Greg Rusedski)
12. (Czech Republic) Jiří Novák (second round, lost to Wayne Arthurs)
13. (Morocco) Younes El Aynaoui (first round, lost to Irakli Labadze)
14. (Sweden) Thomas Enqvist (second round, lost to Mark Philippoussis)
15. (Romania) Andrei Pavel (third round, lost to Nicolás Lapentti)
16. (France) Nicolas Escudé (third round, lost to Mikhail Youzhny)
17. (Germany) Rainer Schüttler (third round, lost to Feliciano López)
18. (Netherlands) Sjeng Schalken (quarterfinals, lost to Lleyton Hewitt)
19. (Argentina) Juan Ignacio Chela (first round, lost to Fernando González)
20. (Spain) Tommy Robredo (first round, lost to Raemon Sluiter)
21. (Belarus) Max Mirnyi (first round, lost to Taylor Dent)
22. (Ecuador) Nicolás Lapentti (quarterfinals, lost to David Nalbandian)
23. (United Kingdom) Greg Rusedski (fourth round, lost to Xavier Malisse)
24. (Argentina) Gastón Gaudio (second round, lost to Mikhail Youzhny)
25. (France) Fabrice Santoro (second round, lost to Adrian Voinea)
26. (United States) Todd Martin (second round, lost to Arnaud Clément)
27. (Belgium) Xavier Malisse (semifinals, lost to David Nalbandian)
28. (Argentina) David Nalbandian (final, lost to Lleyton Hewitt)
29. (United States) James Blake (second round, lost to Richard Krajicek)
30. (Croatia) Ivan Ljubičić (second round, lost to Wayne Ferreira)
31. (Austria) Stefan Koubek (second round, lost to André Sá)
32. (Finland) Jarkko Nieminen (second round, lost to Julian Knowle)

=== Women's singles ===
1. (United States) Venus Williams (final, lost to Serena Williams)
2. (United States) Serena Williams (champion)
3. (United States) Jennifer Capriati (quarterfinals, lost to Amélie Mauresmo)
4. (United States) Monica Seles (quarterfinals, lost to Justine Henin)
5. (Belgium) Kim Clijsters (second round, lost to Elena Likhovtseva)
6. (Belgium) Justine Henin (semifinals, lost to Venus Williams)
7. (Federal Republic of Yugoslavia) Jelena Dokić (fourth round, lost to Daniela Hantuchová)
8. (France) Sandrine Testud (second round, lost to Mary Pierce)
9. (France) Amélie Mauresmo (semifinals, lost to Serena Williams)
10. (Italy) Silvia Farina Elia (third round, lost to Magdalena Maleeva)
11. (Slovakia) Daniela Hantuchová (quarterfinals, lost to Serena Williams)
12. (Russia) Elena Dementieva (fourth round, lost to Justine Henin)
13. (United States) Meghann Shaughnessy (second round, lost to Miriam Oremans)
14. (Uzbekistan) Iroda Tulyaganova (second round, lost to Chanda Rubin)
15. (Israel) Anna Smashnova (first round, lost to Angelique Widjaja)
16. (United States) Lisa Raymond (fourth round, lost to Venus Williams)
17. (Switzerland) Patty Schnyder (second round, lost to Conchita Martínez)
18. (Russia) Anastasia Myskina (third round, lost to Amélie Mauresmo)
19. (Bulgaria) Magdalena Maleeva (fourth round, lost to Elena Likhovtseva)
20. (Thailand) Tamarine Tanasugarn (fourth round, lost to Monica Seles)
21. (Russia) Tatiana Panova (third round, lost to Chanda Rubin)
22. (Luxembourg) Anne Kremer (second round, lost to Maja Matevžič)
23. (Croatia) Iva Majoli (third round, lost to Elena Dementieva)
24. (United States) Alexandra Stevenson (first round, lost to Saori Obata)
25. (France) Nathalie Dechy (third round, lost to Jelena Dokić)
26. (Czech Republic) Dája Bedáňová (third round, lost to Jennifer Capriati)
27. (Japan) Ai Sugiyama (third round, lost to Monica Seles)
28. (Argentina) Paola Suárez (first round, lost to Jill Craybas)
29. (Austria) Barbara Schett (second round, lost to Myriam Casanova)
30. (Argentina) Clarisa Fernández (second round, lost to Els Callens)
31. (Australia) Nicole Pratt (first round, lost to Laura Granville)
32. (South Africa) Amanda Coetzer (second round, lost to Elena Baltacha)

Preceded by 2002 French Open	Grand Slams	Succeeded by 2002 US Open
