= Stephen Amritraj =

Indian-American tennis player (born 1984)

- Country (sports): India
- Residence: Calabasas, California
- Born: March 28, 1984 (age 42) Los Angeles, California, U.S.
- Plays: Right-handed (two-handed backhand)
- Prize money: $39,589

Singles
- Career record: 0–0
- Career titles: 0
- Highest ranking: No. 973 (11 June 2007)

Doubles
- Career record: 4–11
- Career titles: 0
- Highest ranking: No. 192 (10 November 2008)

Stephen Amritraj (born March 28, 1984) is an Indian-American former professional tennis player, who represented India in international tournaments. He is the nephew of Vijay Amritraj, and son of Anand Amritraj.

Amritraj is the son of former world tour player Anand Amritraj and paternal cousin of fellow former pro Prakash Amritraj, who also represented India. He played high school tennis at Crespi Carmelite High School in Encino, California, and NCAA college tennis for Duke University.

Amritraj's career-high singles ranking is world No. 973, which he reached in June 2007.

Amritraj is married to American professional tennis player Alison Riske. In 2024, he purchased intellectual property to the World TeamTennis league and in 2026 announced an upcoming relaunch of the league after the post-COVID pandemic hiatus.
