= Cory Ann Avants =

American tennis player

- Full name: Cory Ann Avants-Dockins
- Country (sports): United States
- Born: January 22, 1985 (age 41) Hawaii
- Plays: Right-handed
- Prize money: $90,601

Singles
- Career record: 114–104
- Career titles: 2 ITF
- Highest ranking: No. 226 (July 26, 2004)

Doubles
- Career record: 42–50
- Career titles: 1 ITF
- Highest ranking: No. 193 (September 27, 2004)

Cory Ann Avants-Dockins (born January 22, 1985) is a former professional tennis player from the United States.

== Biography ==
Born in Hawaii, Avants grew up in North Carolina, coached in tennis by her parents Hank and Sharon. A right-handed player, she had both a two-handed forehand and backhand.

Avants won her first ITF Circuit title at Raleigh in 2000.

From 2001 she competed as a professional and reached the final round of qualifying at the 2001 US Open, before having to retire hurt with a knee injury.

As a wildcard, she featured in WTA Tour main draws at Los Angeles in 2001 and the Miami Open the following year.

She continued to compete in juniors, making the quarterfinals of the girls' singles at the 2002 Wimbledon Championships and the semi-finals of the 2003 US Open as a qualifier, which included a win over Ana Ivanovic.

In 2004, she reached her career best ranking of world No. 226 and won her second ITF title, the Houston Pro Tennis Classic.

Avants qualified for the main draw of the WTA Tour tournament in Cincinnati in 2005.

== ITF finals ==
$25,000 tournaments
$10,000 tournaments

=== Singles (2–1) ===
Result	No.	Date	Tournament	Surface	Opponent	Score
Win	1.	Oct 2000	Raleigh, United States	Clay	(Belarus) Eugenia Subbotina	5–7, 6–4, 6–3
Loss	2.	Feb 2004	Boca Raton, US	Hard	(India) Sania Mirza	3–6, 2–6
Win	3.	May 2004	Houston, USA	Hard	Varvara Lepchenko	6–1, 6–4

=== Doubles (1–5) ===
Result	No.	Date	Tournament	Surface	Partner	Opponents	Score
Loss	1	Apr 2004	Jackson, US	Clay	(United States) Kristen Schlukebir	(Canada) Stéphanie Dubois (Russia) Alisa Kleybanova	2–6, 3–6
Win	2.	May 2004	Hilton Head Island, US	Hard	Varvara Lepchenko	Tanner Cochran (Australia) Jaslyn Hewitt	6–2, 3–6, 6–3
Loss	3.	Jun 2004	Allentown, US	Hard	(United States) Varvara Lepchenko	(United States) Angela Haynes (United States) Diana Ospina	0–6, 2–6
Loss	4.	Sep 2004	Ashland, US	Hard	(United States) Kristen Schlukebir	(Germany) Sandra Klösel (Argentina) María Emilia Salerni	3–6, 3–6
Loss	5.	Jan 2005	Tampa, US	Hard	(United States) Kristen Schlukebir	(United States) Julie Ditty (Czech Republic) Vladimíra Uhlířová	1–6, 2–6
Loss	6.	Jun 2005	Allentown, US	Hard	(United States) Kristen Schlukebir	(United States) Ansley Cargill (United States) Julie Ditty	2–6, 3–6
