= Elke Clijsters =

Belgian tennis player

- Country (sports): Belgium
- Residence: Bree, Belgium
- Born: 18 January 1985 (age 41) Bilzen, Belgium
- Turned pro: 2000
- Retired: 2004
- Plays: Right (two-handed backhand)
- Prize money: $47,951

Singles
- Career record: 53–54
- Career titles: 1 ITF
- Highest ranking: No. 389 (15 September 2003)

Doubles
- Career record: 52–23
- Career titles: 7 ITF
- Highest ranking: No. 244 (6 October 2003)

Elke Clijsters (born 18 January 1985) is a former professional tennis player from Belgium.

== Career ==
Elke won the 2002 girls' Wimbledon Championships doubles title with Barbora Strýcová, and the girls' US Open doubles title with compatriot Kirsten Flipkens. Her highest singles ranking was 389, a ranking she achieved on 15 September 2003. She played in the Belgium Fed Cup team in 2002, 2003 and 2004, losing all four matches, of which one was a singles match. In 2004, she reached the finals of two ITF singles tournaments, winning the one in Bournemouth. In the same year, she also reached the finals of two ITF doubles tournaments, of which she also won one. She retired in 2004 due to a persistent back injury.

In 2021, Clijsters participated in the Belgian version of The Bachelorette.

== Personal life ==
Her father was the Belgian football player Lei Clijsters (1956–2009) and her sister is former world No. 1 tennis player, Kim Clijsters (born 1983). Elke married footballer Jelle Van Damme on 31 May 2008 in Bree, Belgium. They had their first child in 2009, a boy. She gave birth to their second child, a girl in November 2010. Their marriage ended in 2016. She also dated darts player Mike De Decker.

== ITF Circuit finals ==
$100,000 tournaments
$75,000 tournaments
$50,000 tournaments
$25,000 tournaments
$10,000 tournaments

=== Singles: 4 (1 title, 3 runner-ups) ===
Result	No.	Date	Tournament	Surface	Opponent	Score
Loss	1.	7 April 2003	ITF Torre del Greco, Italy	Clay	(Italy) Raffaella Bindi	4–6, 2–6
Loss	2.	11 August 2003	ITF Koksijde, Belgium	Clay	(Czech Republic) Lenka Snajdrová	4–6, 2–6
Win	3.	1 May 2004	ITF Bournemouth, United Kingdom	Clay	(United Kingdom) Melanie South	3–,6 6–1, 6–2
Loss	4.	8 May 2004	ITF Edinburgh, United Kingdom	Clay	(Russia) Ekaterina Kozhokina	1–6, 4–6

=== Doubles: 10 (7 titles, 3 runner-ups) ===
Result	No.	Date	Tournament	Surface	Partner	Opponents	Score
Loss	1.	21 August 2000	ITF Westende, Belgium	Clay	(Belgium) Caroline Maes	(Netherlands) Natasha Galouza (Netherlands) Anouk Sterk	1–6, 0–6
Win	2.	3 September 2001	ITF Pétange, Luxembourg	Clay	(Australia) Jaslyn Hewitt	(Belarus) Natallia Dziamidzenka (Netherlands) Kika Hogendoorn	6–1, 6–3
Win	3.	5 August 2002	ITF Rebecq, Belgium	Clay	(Australia) Jaslyn Hewitt	(Belgium) Leslie Butkiewicz (Netherlands) Tessy van de Ven	3–6, 6–3, 6–4
Win	4.	3 November 2002	ITF Stockholm, Sweden	Hard (i)	(Poland) Marta Domachowska	(Sweden) Jenny Loow (Netherlands) Suzanne van Hartingsveldt	6–1, 6–1
Loss	5.	21 January 2003	ITF Hull, United Kingdom	Hard (i)	(Serbia and Montenegro) Borka Majstorović	(Russia) Irina Bulykina (Kazakhstan) Galina Voskoboeva	6–4, 6–7, 3–6
Win	6.	2 February 2003	ITF Tipton, United Kingdom	Hard (i)	(Romania) Liana Ungur	(Czech Republic) Zuzana Černá (Czech Republic) Iveta Gerlová	6–3, 6–2
Win	7.	18 May 2003	ITF Casale Monferrato, Italy	Clay	(New Zealand) Leanne Baker	(Netherlands) Jolanda Mens (Germany) Stefanie Weis	6–3, 6–4
Win	8.	11 August 2003	ITF Koksijde, Belgium	Clay	(Belgium) Kirsten Flipkens	(Czech Republic) Zuzana Černá (Czech Republic) Vladimíra Uhlířová	6–2, 6–4
Loss	9.	2 March 2004	ITF Buchen, Germany	Hard (i)	(Belgium) Caroline Maes	(Czech Republic) Lucie Hradecká (Czech Republic) Eva Hrdinová	1–6, 4–6
Win	10.	29 March 2004	ITF Napoli, Italy	Clay	(Luxembourg) Mandy Minella	(Netherlands) Michelle Gerards (Netherlands) Mariëlle Hoogland	6–1, 6–0
