= Shadisha Robinson =

American tennis player

- Country (sports): United States
- Born: July 12, 1985 (age 41) New York City
- Height: 5 ft 8 in (173 cm)
- Plays: Left-handed
- Prize money: $18,167

Singles
- Career titles: 1 ITF
- Highest ranking: No. 416 (July 14, 2003)

Grand Slam singles results
- US Open: Q1 (2003)

Doubles
- Career titles: 1 ITF
- Highest ranking: No. 556 (July 28, 2003)

Shadisha Robinson (born July 12, 1985) is an American former professional tennis player.

Raised in Queens, Robinson showed promise as a junior and moved to Florida to further her tennis. A left-hander player, she ranked second nationally in the 14s age group.

While competing on the professional tour, she reached the best singles world ranking of 416. She won an ITF title in Evansville in 2002 and the following year qualified for the main draw of the Family Circle Cup in Charleston, where she fell in the first round to Marie-Gaiane Mikaelian.

Robinson played collegiate tennis for the University of Georgia and the University of South Florida.

== ITF finals ==
=== Singles: 1 (1–0) ===
Outcome	No.	Date	Tournament	Surface	Opponent	Score
Winner	1.	Jul 2002	ITF Evansville, United States	Hard	(Australia) Deanna Roberts	6–4, 7–5

=== Doubles: 2 (1–1) ===
Outcome	No.	Date	Tournament	Surface	Partner	Opponents	Score
Winner	1.	Jun 2005	ITF Hilton Head, United States	Hard	(United States) Robin Stephenson	(United States) Ansley Cargill (United States) Aleke Tsoubanos	6–3, 7–5
Runner-up	2.	Jul 2005	ITF Southlake, United States	Hard	(United States) Megan Bradley	(United States) Anne Smith (United States) Tara Snyder	6–3, 6–7^{(4)}, 6–7^{(4)}
