= Silvana Bauer =

Dutch tennis player

- Country (sports): Netherlands
- Born: 14 April 1986 (age 38)
- Plays: Right-handed
- Prize money: $3,612

Singles
- Career record: 10–5
- Highest ranking: No. 762 (2 December 2002)

Doubles
- Career record: 1–2

Silvana Bauer (born 14 April 1986) is a Dutch former professional tennis player.

Bauer, a native of Zeeland, played in all junior grand slam tournaments and had a best ITF junior world ranking of 11.

In 2002, she made a WTA Tour main draw appearance at the Ordina Open and toured with the Netherlands Fed Cup team for an away tie in Australia, as a reserve.

At the age of 17, she decided to give the game away to the surprise of many in Dutch tennis.

== ITF finals ==
=== Singles: 1 (1–0) ===
Outcome	No.	Date	Tournament	Surface	Opponent	Score
Winner	1.	16 June 2002	ITF Raalte, Netherlands	Clay	(Netherlands) Jolanda Mens	6–1, 6–0
