= Ally Baker =

American tennis player

- Full name: Allison Baker
- Country (sports): United States
- Born: April 10, 1986 (age 38); Raleigh, North Carolina
- Plays: Left-handed
- Prize money: $58,775

Singles
- Career titles: 1 ITF
- Highest ranking: No. 264 (February 2, 2004)

Grand Slam singles results
- US Open: 1R (2002)

Doubles
- Career titles: 2 ITF
- Highest ranking: No. 170 (February 23, 2004)

Grand Slam doubles results
- US Open: 1R (2002, 2003)

Allison Baker (born April 10, 1986), also known as Ally Baker, is a former professional tennis player from the United States.

== Biography ==
Baker was born in Raleigh, North Carolina, one of two daughters of Bill and Leigh. A left-handed player, she was coached by John Evert at the Evert Tennis Academy in Florida from the age of 14.

When she was 15 she won an ITF singles title in Greenville and also competed successfully on the international junior circuit. She and German Anna-Lena Groenefeld narrowly lost the girls' doubles final at the 2002 Wimbledon Championships, 6–8 in the third set. In girls' singles events she made the quarter-finals of the 2002 US Open, the semi-finals of the 2002 Orange Bowl, won the title at Roehampton in 2003 and was a quarter-finalist at the 2003 Wimbledon Championships. While still a junior she received an Adidas sponsorship and featured beside Andy Roddick in a commercial for French sports company Babolat.

Midway through 2002, at the age of 16, Baker turned professional and by the end of the year had signed up with a sports management company. She was granted a wildcard to compete in the main draw of the 2002 US Open and took world number 38 Elena Likhovtseva to a match deciding tie-break, in a first round loss. In addition to her singles appearance she also featured in the women's doubles draw, with Bethanie Mattek. She made her WTA Tour main draw debut as a wildcard at the 2003 Miami Open and was beaten in the opening round 6–0, 6–0, by qualifier Marion Bartoli. At the 2003 US Open she had to go through qualifying and fell in the second round, but did feature in the main draw of the doubles, with Angela Haynes. After the US Open she won the doubles event at the $50,000 Columbus ITF tournament, with Teryn Ashley, which was the biggest title of her professional career. She made her second and last WTA Tour appearance in the doubles at the 2003 Challenge Bell held in Quebec, but didn't get to complete the first set in the opening round, with her partner Sarah Taylor spraining her ankle and having to retire hurt.

An injury to her left foot resulted in a premature retirement from tennis in 2004, aged only 18. She later unsuccessfully sued Adidas for negligence over the injury, which she claimed was caused by the company's shoes that she had been supplied through their sponsorship arrangement since her junior career. The shoes were sent without any examination of the size required and it was later revealed that the shoes she had been competing in were three sizes too wide. To rectify this she was flown by Adidas to Oregon to have a custom-fitted shoe designed, but she ended up requiring surgery for the torn ligament in 2004, after which she lost the ability to run. The suit, which was filed locally, was dismissed for improper venue as the contract she had signed with Adidas stated that any contractual issues would need to be adjudicated in Amsterdam, where the company had their head office.

Baker, a graduate of the University of North Carolina, now works at PWC in Nashville.

== ITF finals ==
Legend
$75,000 tournaments
$50,000 tournaments
$25,000 tournaments
$10,000 tournaments

=== Singles (1–1) ===
Result	No.	Date	Tournament	Surface	Opponent	Score
Win	1.	Sep 2001	Greenville, United States	Clay	(France) Julie De Roo	6–3 RET
Loss	2.	Sep 2001	Raleigh, United States	Clay	(Hungary) Melinda Czink	3–6, 2–6

=== Doubles (2–2) ===
Result	No.	Date	Tournament	Surface	Partner	Opponents	Score
Win	1.	Sep 2001	Raleigh, United States	Clay	(Hungary) Melinda Czink	(New Zealand) Leanne Baker (New Zealand) Tracey O'Connor	6–4, 1–6, 6–4
Loss	2.	Sep 2002	Peachtree City, United States	Hard	(Puerto Rico) Kristina Brandi	(United States) Jennifer Russell (Australia) Christina Wheeler	2–6, 6–7^{(3)}
Win	3.	Sep 2003	Columbus, United States	Hard	(United States) Teryn Ashley	(Argentina) María Emilia Salerni (Romania) Andreea Vanc	6–3, 6–7^{(4)}, 6–2
Loss	4.	Feb 2004	Midland, United States	Hard (i)	(United States) Tara Snyder	(Sweden) Sofia Arvidsson (Sweden) Åsa Svensson	6–7^{(5)}, 2–6
