= Tiffany Welford =

Australian tennis player

- Country (sports): Australia
- Residence: Sunshine Coast, Australia
- Born: 12 April 1985 (age 39); Jakarta, Indonesia
- Height: 1.68 m (5 ft 6 in)
- Turned pro: 2001
- Plays: Right-handed (two-handed backhand)
- Prize money: $42,367

Singles
- Career record: 82–83
- Career titles: 1 ITF
- Highest ranking: No. 276 (7 February 2005)

Grand Slam singles results
- Australian Open: 1R (2005)

Doubles
- Career record: 34–39
- Career titles: 1 ITF
- Highest ranking: No. 478 (11 May 2009)

Tiffany Welford (born 12 April 1985) is an Australian former professional tennis player.

Her highest singles ranking by the WTA is 276, which she reached on 7 February 2005. Her career-high in doubles is 478, achieved on 11 May 2009.

She was absent from the tour from March 2005 to April 2008 due to chronic injury. She is nicknamed "TJ". Her younger sister Julianne ("JT") competed on the junior tour.

== ITF finals ==
$100,000 tournaments
$75,000 tournaments
$50,000 tournaments
$25,000 tournaments
$10,000 tournaments

=== Singles (1–0) ===
Outcome	No.	Date	Location	Surface	Opponent	Score
Winner	1.	8 November 2004	Port Pirie, Australia	Hard	(China) Yuan Meng	5–7, 6–2, 7–5

=== Doubles (1–4) ===
Outcome	No.	Date	Location	Surface	Partner	Opponents	Score
Runner-up	1.	16 June 2002	Raalte, Netherlands	Clay	(Australia) Darya Ivanov	(Netherlands) Jolanda Mens (Australia) Sarah Stone	6–4, 3–6, 0–6
Runner-up	2.	5 May 2008	Tarakan, Indonesia	Hard	(Hong Kong) Yang Zi-Jun	(Indonesia) Ayu Fani Damayanti (Indonesia) Liza Andriyani	2–6, 3–6
Winner	3.	31 May 2008	Bangkok, Thailand	Hard	(Indonesia) Yayuk Basuki	(Russia) Elina Gasanova (Indonesia) Lavinia Tananta	2–6, 7–6^{(7)}, [10–4]
Runner-up	4.	26 October 2008	Port Pirie, Australia	Hard	(South Africa) Lizaan du Plessis	(United States) Robin Stephenson (South Africa) Natalie Grandin	2–6, 0–6
Runner-up	5.	23 May 2010	Landisville, United States	Hard	(New Zealand) Dianne Hollands	(United States) Alexandra Mueller (United States) Gail Brodsky	6–4, 5–7, [2–10]
