= 2004 Siebel Open – Doubles =

Doubles
- 2004 Siebel Open

Final
- Champions: (United States) James Blake (United States) Mardy Fish
- Runners-up: (United States) Rick Leach (United States) Brian MacPhie
- Score: 6–2, 7–5

Details
- Draw: 16
- Seeds: 4

Events
Singles	Doubles
← 2003 ·	Pacific Coast Championships	· 2005 →

Hyung-Taik Lee and Vladimir Voltchkov were the defending champions but only Lee competed that year with Brian Vahaly.

Lee and Vahaly lost in the quarterfinals to Jeff Coetzee and Chris Haggard.

James Blake and Mardy Fish won in the final 6–2, 7–5 against Rick Leach and Brian MacPhie.

== Seeds ==
Champion seeds are indicated in bold text while text in italics indicates the round in which those seeds were eliminated.

1. (United States) Scott Humphries / (The Bahamas) Mark Merklein (first round)
2. (Australia) Jordan Kerr / (United States) Jim Thomas (quarterfinals)
3. (Australia) Todd Perry / (Japan) Thomas Shimada (quarterfinals)
4. (United States) Rick Leach / (United States) Brian MacPhie (final)

== Draw ==
=== Key ===
- Q = Qualifier
- WC = Wild card
- LL = Lucky loser
- Alt = Alternate
- SE = Special exempt
- PR = Protected ranking
- ITF = ITF entry
- JE = Junior exempt
- w/o = Walkover
- r = Retired
- d = Defaulted
- SR = Special ranking

First round
1	(United States) S Humphries (The Bahamas) M Merklein	6^{3}	**6**	6^{6}
(South Africa) **J Coetzee** (South Africa) **C Haggard**	**7^{7}**	3	**7^{8}**
(South Korea) **H-T Lee** (United States) **B Vahaly**	**6**	3	**7^{7}**
WC	(United States) B Coupe (Russia) D Tursunov	3	**6**	6^{2}
4	(United States) **R Leach** (United States) **B MacPhie**	**7^{7}**	**6**
(United States) J-M Gambill (United States) T Parrott	6^{4}	4
(Germany) **N Kiefer** (South Africa) **W Moodie**	**6**	**6**
(United States) D Ayala (United States) R Ginepri	3	3
WC	(United States) H Cicma (South Africa) G Schweitzer	1	3
(Germany) **K Braasch** (Austria) **J Melzer**	**6**	**6**
(Georgia (country)) I Labadze (France) C Saulnier	**6**	3	4
3	(Australia) **T Perry** (Japan) **T Shimada**	3	**6**	**6**
(United States) **J Blake** (United States) **M Fish**	**6**	**6**
(Belgium) X Malisse (Belgium) T Vanhoudt	4	2
(United States) P Goldstein (United States) V Spadea	**6**	5	4
2	(Australia) **J Kerr** (United States) **J Thomas**	4	**7**	**6**

Quarterfinals
(South Africa) **J Coetzee** (South Africa) **C Haggard**	**6**	**6**
(South Korea) H-T Lee (United States) B Vahaly	3	3
4	(United States) **R Leach** (United States) **B MacPhie**	**7**	0	**6**
(Germany) N Kiefer (South Africa) W Moodie	5	**6**	4
(Germany) **K Braasch** (Austria) **J Melzer**	3	**7**	**6**
3	(Australia) T Perry (Japan) T Shimada	**6**	5	3
(United States) **J Blake** (United States) **M Fish**	**6**	**6**
2	(Australia) J Kerr (United States) J Thomas	4	3

Semifinals
(South Africa) J Coetzee (South Africa) C Haggard	6^{5}	**6**	3
4	(United States) **R Leach** (United States) **B MacPhie**	**7^{7}**	4	**6**
(Germany) K Braasch (Austria) J Melzer	3	5
(United States) **J Blake** (United States) **M Fish**	**6**	**7**

Final
4	(United States) Rick Leach (United States) Brian MacPhie	2	5
(United States) **James Blake** (United States) **Mardy Fish**	**6**	**7**
