= 2007 Campbell's Hall of Fame Tennis Championships – Doubles =

Doubles
- 2007 Campbell's Hall of Fame Tennis Championships

Final
- Champions: (Australia) Jordan Kerr (United States) Jim Thomas
- Runners-up: (Australia) Nathan Healey (Russia) Igor Kunitsyn
- Score: 6–3, 7–5

Events
Singles	Doubles
← 2006 ·	Campbell's Hall of Fame Tennis Championships	· 2008 →

Robert Kendrick and Jürgen Melzer were the defending champions but did not participate this year.

Jordan Kerr and Jim Thomas won in the final 6–3, 7–5, against Nathan Healey and Igor Kunitsyn.

== Seeds ==
1. (South Africa) Wesley Moodie / (France) Fabrice Santoro (quarterfinals, withdrew)
2. (Australia) Jordan Kerr / (United States) Jim Thomas (champions)
3. ~~(France) Michaël Llodra / (France) Nicolas Mahut~~ (withdrew)
4. (United States) Justin Gimelstob / (Australia) Todd Perry (first round)

== Draw ==
=== Key ===
- Q = Qualifier
- WC = Wild card
- LL = Lucky loser
- Alt = Alternate
- SE = Special exempt
- PR = Protected ranking
- ITF = ITF entry
- JE = Junior exempt
- w/o = Walkover
- r = Retired
- d = Defaulted
- SR = Special ranking

=== Draw ===
First round
1	(South Africa) W Moodie (France) F Santoro	6	6
WC	(India) P Amritraj (Pakistan) A-u-H Qureshi	0	4
(Australia) N Healey (Russia) I Kunitsyn	6	6
(Austria) A Peya (Germany) M Zverev	2	3
4	(United States) J Gimelstob (Australia) T Perry	6	4	[8]
(Thailand) Sa Ratiwatana (Thailand) So Ratiwatana	2	6	[10]
(United Kingdom) J Delgado (Belgium) D Norman	7^{7}	5	[10]
(Canada) F Dancevic (United States) T Parrott	6^{5}	7	[8]
(Russia) T Gabashvili (Netherlands Antilles) J-J Rojer	1	3
(United States) S Lipsky (United States) D Martin	6	6
(United States) E Butorac (United Kingdom) R Hutchins	6	6
Alt	(United States) K Kim (Thailand) D Udomchoke	3	4
WC	(United States) M Fish (United States) J Isner	7^{9}	6
(United Kingdom) A Bogdanovic (United States) V Spadea	6^{7}	1
(Australia) C Guccione (Australia) S Huss	5	6^{6}
2	(Australia) J Kerr (United States) J Thomas	7	7^{8}

Quarterfinals
1	(South Africa) W Moodie (France) F Santoro
(Australia) N Healey (Russia) I Kunitsyn	w/o
(Thailand) Sa Ratiwatana (Thailand) So Ratiwatana	6	4	[10]
(United Kingdom) J Delgado (Belgium) D Norman	2	6	[2]
(United States) S Lipsky (United States) D Martin	7^{7}	7
(United States) E Butorac (United Kingdom) R Hutchins	6^{4}	5
WC	(United States) M Fish (United States) J Isner	6	3	[6]
2	(Australia) J Kerr (United States) J Thomas	4	6	[10]

Semifinals
(Australia) N Healey (Russia) I Kunitsyn	7	6
(Thailand) Sa Ratiwatana (Thailand) So Ratiwatana	5	4
(United States) S Lipsky (United States) D Martin	3	6	[9]
2	(Australia) J Kerr (United States) J Thomas	6	3	[11]

Final
(Australia) N Healey (Russia) I Kunitsyn	3	5
2	(Australia) J Kerr (United States) J Thomas	6	7
