= 2005 SAP Open – Doubles =

Doubles
- 2005 SAP Open

Final
- Champions: (Australia) Wayne Arthurs (Australia) Paul Hanley
- Runners-up: (Switzerland) Yves Allegro (Germany) Michael Kohlmann
- Score: 7–6^{(7–4)}, 6–4

Details
- Draw: 16
- Seeds: 4

Events
Singles	Doubles
← 2004 ·	Pacific Coast Championships	· 2006 →

James Blake and Mardy Fish were the defending champions, but lost in the quarterfinals this year.

Wayne Arthurs and Paul Hanley won the title, defeating Yves Allegro and Michael Kohlmann 7–6^{(7–4)}, 6–4 in the final.

== Seeds ==
1. (Australia) Wayne Arthurs / (Australia) Paul Hanley (champions)
2. (Sweden) Simon Aspelin / (Australia) Todd Perry (semifinals)
3. (Switzerland) Yves Allegro / (Germany) Michael Kohlmann (final)
4. (United States) Rick Leach / (United States) Brian MacPhie (first round)

== Draw ==
=== Key ===
- Q = Qualifier
- WC = Wild card
- LL = Lucky loser
- Alt = Alternate
- SE = Special exempt
- PR = Protected ranking
- ITF = ITF entry
- JE = Junior exempt
- w/o = Walkover
- r = Retired
- d = Defaulted
- SR = Special ranking

=== Draw ===
First round
1	(Australia) W Arthurs (Australia) P Hanley	7^{8}	2	6
(Australia) J Kerr (United States) J Thomas	6^{6}	6	2
(Australia) A Fisher (Germany) P Kohlschreiber	3
WC	(United States) L Jensen (United States) M Jensen	3^{r}
4	(United States) R Leach (United States) B MacPhie	6^{5}	6^{3}
(Austria) J Melzer (United States) G Oliver	7^{7}	7^{7}
WC	(United States) J-M Gambill (United States) R Ginepri	6	2	7^{7}
(South Africa) J Coetzee (France) C Saulnier	3	6	6^{1}
(Belgium) X Malisse (Belgium) T Vanhoudt	6	4	6
(Czech Republic) J Levinský (Czech Republic) J Novák	3	6	3
(South Africa) C Haggard (South Africa) R Koenig	3	6	5
3	(Switzerland) Y Allegro (Germany) M Kohlmann	6	3	7
(Georgia (country)) I Labadze (South Korea) H-t Lee	3	4
(United States) J Blake (United States) M Fish	6	6
(United States) K Kim (United States) T Parrott	4	4
2	(Sweden) S Aspelin (Australia) T Perry	6	6

Quarterfinals
1	(Australia) W Arthurs (Australia) P Hanley	6	6
(Australia) A Fisher (Germany) P Kohlschreiber	3	4
(Austria) J Melzer (United States) G Oliver	3	2
WC	(United States) J-M Gambill (United States) R Ginepri	6	6
(Belgium) X Malisse (Belgium) T Vanhoudt	6	3	3
3	(Switzerland) Y Allegro (Germany) M Kohlmann	3	6	6
(United States) J Blake (United States) M Fish	6	6^{3}	3
2	(Sweden) S Aspelin (Australia) T Perry	0	7^{7}	6

Semifinals
1	(Australia) W Arthurs (Australia) P Hanley	2	7^{7}	7^{7}
WC	(United States) J-M Gambill (United States) R Ginepri	6	6^{4}	6^{1}
3	(Switzerland) Y Allegro (Germany) M Kohlmann	7^{8}	7
2	(Sweden) S Aspelin (Australia) T Perry	6^{6}	5

Final
1	(Australia) W Arthurs (Australia) P Hanley	7^{8}	6
3	(Switzerland) Y Allegro (Germany) M Kohlmann	6^{6}	4
