= Harry Cicma =

American tennis player and sports anchor

- Country (sports): United States
- Residence: West New York, New Jersey, Miami, Florida
- Born: February 18, 1982 (age 44) Providence, Rhode Island
- Plays: Right-handed (two-handed backhand)

Singles
- Career record: 0–0 (at ATP Tour level, Grand Slam level, and in Davis Cup)
- Career titles: 0

Doubles
- Career record: 1–5 (at ATP Tour level, Grand Slam level, Futures, and in Davis Cup)
- Career titles: 0
- Highest ranking: No. 1262 (June 16, 2003), No. 75 Team Race (February 16, 2004)

Harry Cicma (born February 18, 1982) is an American former tennis player and TV broadcaster.

== Early life and TV career ==
Harry Cicma was born in Providence, Rhode Island, to George Cicma, with origins from Macedonia, and Carol Cicma, with origins from Epirus. Cicma is of Greek origins. His grandfather was Haralambie Cicma, an Aromanian immigrant who became a dermatologist in the United States. After graduating from high school, Cicma joined Rutgers University's Division I varsity tennis team and United States Tennis Association tournaments.

After getting his first professional on-air TV position at the 2003 US Open Tennis Championships in New York City, Cicma went on to work for other outlets. Cicma also won an Emmy Award with WNBC News 4 New York, for his on-air reporting during Hurricane Sandy. He is also the TV voice of World Team Tennis.

=== TV career ===
Cicma has worked as a sports anchor for numerous stations, including Fios 1, News 12 New Jersey, WSHM, WFSB-TV, WJAR-TV, and recently WNBC and the NBC Sports Group.

Cicma is the host and executive producer of the nationally syndicated TV series World Tennis with Harry Cicma for NESN. He is the founder of Harry Cicma Productions LLC. Cicma has served as the executive producer and host for national productions, including FXFL Football, Turkish Airlines Open Golf, Richard Branson's Necker Cup Tennis, The Miami Marathon, Brooklyn Boxing, Fencing Masters NYC, and World Team Tennis.

Cicma has announced tennis for every major TV network, including ESPN2, NBC, CBS Digital, Tennis Channel, and FOX Sports Net. He also served as the US Open master of ceremonies on Arthur Ashe Stadium Court, and at Madison Square Garden.

Cicma is an inductee of the Greek Sports Hall of Fame, and Classical High School Sports Hall of Fame.

== Professional tennis career ==
=== 2002–2004: Professional debut ===
Cicma's first ATP Tour professional event was in October 2002 at the age of 20 at the 2002 Miller Lite Hall of Fame Championships in doubles with Greg Schweitzer. They lost in the round of 16 to Gabriel Trifu and Glenn Weiner.

Cicma and Schweitzer began 2003 at the Forest Hills Challenger 2003, they were defeated in the first round by Federico Browne and Ignacio Hirigoyen before their loss in Atlantic City challenger 2003 to Bjorn Rehnquist and Marcus Sarstrand.

Cicma and Schweitzer began 2004 by qualifying for the main draw, round of 16, of the ATP 2004 Siebel Open where they faced Jürgen Melzer and Karsten Braasch.

In 2016, Cicma made his return to Professional Tennis, competing with fellow American Evan King. Cicma and King played doubled together in the Main Draw of the ITF ATP Puerto Rico Open Futures in Mayaguez. They defeated Sam Beddow and Erwin Rodriguez in the opening round, 6–3, 6–1, en route the Quarterfinals, where they fell to eventual singles Champion Thai-Son Kwiatkowski and Quinton Vega 7–5, 6–4.

=== 2003, 2007, 2008 Singles ===
Cicma made his solo player debut in 2003 at the 2003 Forest Hills Challenger but he lost to James Caiati and in 2003 Atlantic City challenger, Cicma lost to Nestor Bernabe in first round.

Cicma's career best singles victory was over former top 40 World Ranked player Bud Schultz, in the opening round at the 2003 Weymouth Invitational Money Championship, he went on to lose to Great Britain Olympian Kyle Spencer in the next round.

Cicma won the Robert Freeman Memorial USTA Red Clay Money Championships in 2006. He also won the Rhode Island State Closed Men's Championship (a non ATP Tour sanctioned event).

Cicma began 2007 by losing at 2007 Campbell's Hall of Fame Tennis Championships to Jim Thomas.

Cicma's final professional event was in July 2008 at age of 26 at the 2008 Hall of Fame Tennis Championships but lost to Michael McClune, 6–0, 6–0 in the qualifying rounds.

During the USTA Juniors, while at Classical High School, Cicma was ranked Nationally in both singles and doubles. He represented New England at the USTA Nationals, a top 10 USTA Nationally Ranked Doubles player in America, prior to getting recruited by Rutgers University. At Rutgers, while graduating Cum Laude, and being named a 4 Time All Big East Academic Team Selection. During college, Cicma was an elected Rutgers University Senator, and member of the WRSU-FM Radio Station, and RUTV. He was inducted into the Rutgers Cap and Skull Honor Society, regarded as the top honor for any Rutgers Graduate.

In 2018, Cicma was inducted into the Greek Sports Hall of Fame, for his work in TV and Media; along with Pete Sampras, Bob Costas, Eric Karros, and Steve Lappas.

In 2008, Cicma was inducted into the Classical High School Athletic Hall of Fame.

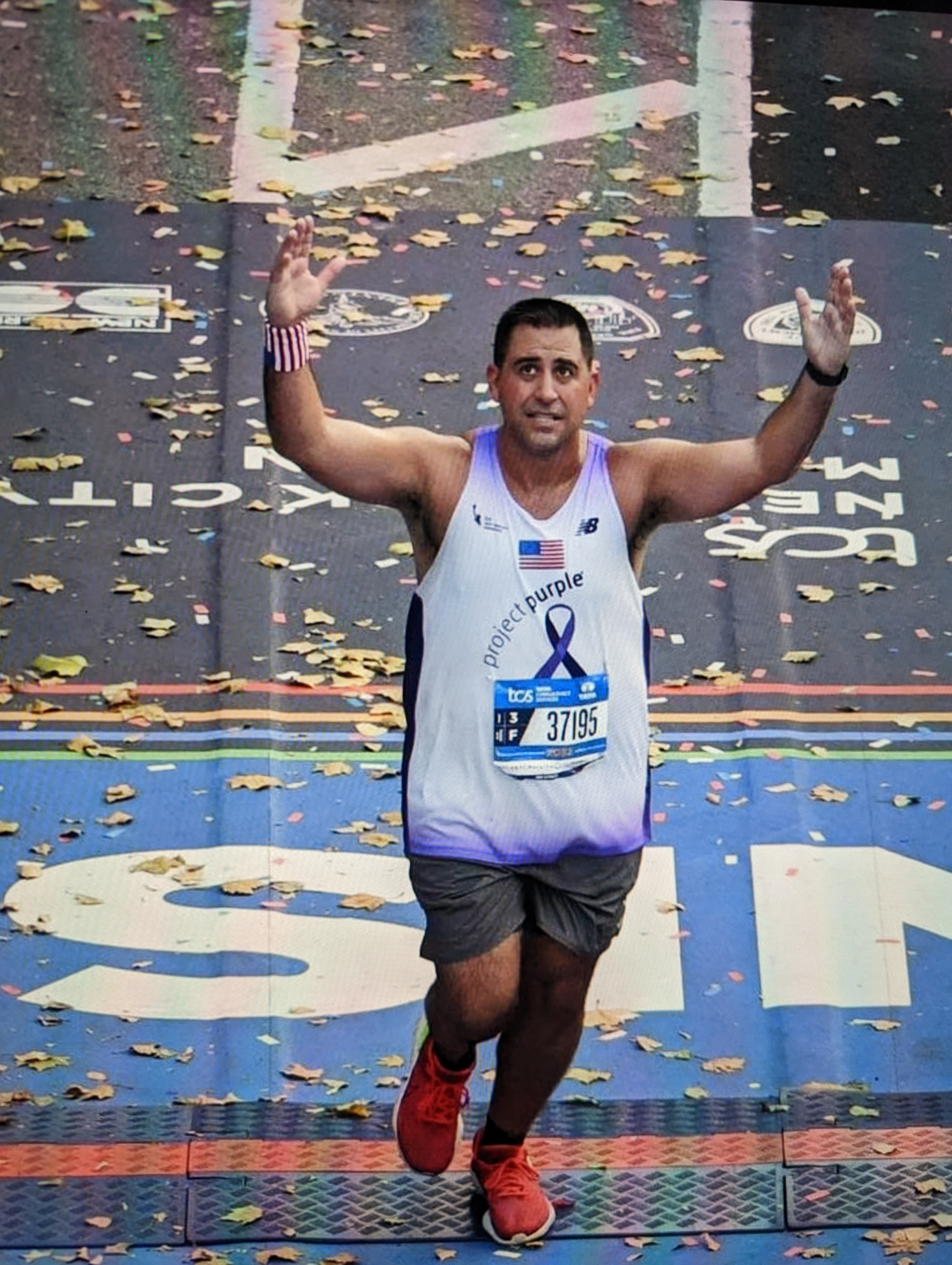
Finish line

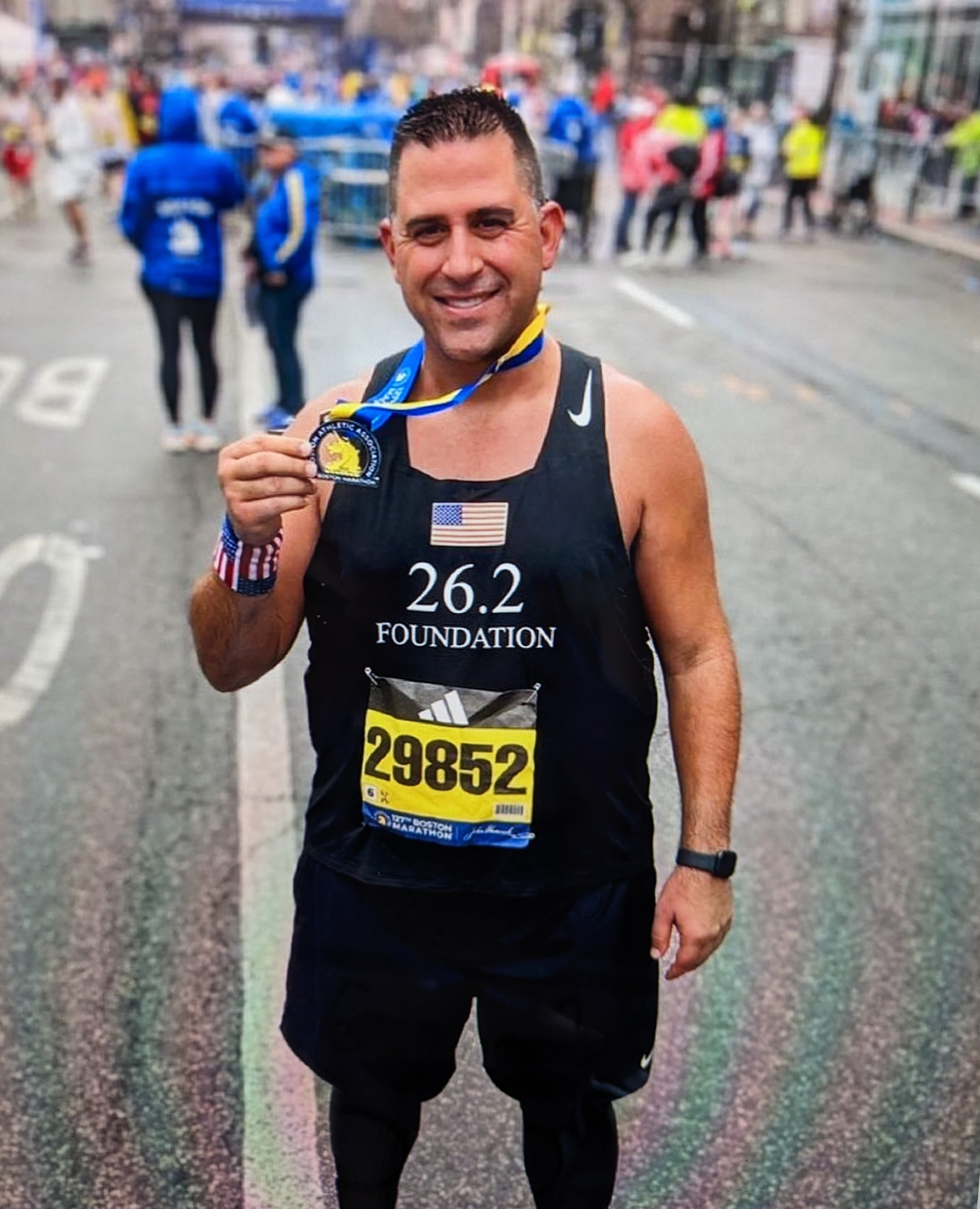
Boston Marathon Medalist

== Post-tennis career ==
Cicma began his sports anchoring career in 2004, immediately upon graduating from Rutgers University with a degree in Journalism and Political Science. Since retiring from singles tennis competition after the 2008 Hall of Fame Tennis Championships, Cicma continued his work as a Network TV Sports Anchor, and Producer for various National Broadcasts. Cicma finished NYC marathon in 2022. In 2023, after 5 months of intense training, he medaled in Boston Marathon.

Harry Cicma is a Graduate and Alumnus of Wharton School of Business, at the University of Pennsylvania. Cicma completed his Graduate School studies at Wharton, and graduated from the Wharton Management Program in 2025 (WMP 25). Cicma also has a master's degree in public health from Brown University.

Harry Cicma is a National TV Anchor and Executive Producer on both NBC Sports National and ESPN National TV. Cicma Hosts and Produces various Olympic Sports on NBC, including the Sydney Marathon and USA Fencing.

=== Notable Production Accolades ===
As CEO and President of Harry Cicma Productions LLC, Cicma’s company is regarded as one of the top Sports Production Firms in the United States. In 2021, Cicma served as Executive Producer of the PPA Pro Pickleball Tour. While at PPA, Cicma brought Professional Pickleball to ESPN National TV and signed the first long-term TV deal in Pickleball History. Cicma also helped create and broker the first data deal in Pickleball History with Genius Sport. Furthermore, during the COVID Pandemic, Cicma launched and Founded the International Tennis Series Pro Tour, and the United States Pro Tennis Series, with Sport Radar and IMG Arena, which became the UTR Pro Tennis Series.

Cicma is also a leading Producer and Host for ESPN’s National TV Coverage of niche Sports, providing dozens of new sports to the Network, and ESPN The Ocho.

Notable Leagues which Cicma has helped launch as Executive Producer are, PPA Pro Pickleball, Padel, UTR Pro Tennis Tour, and various other niche sports.

Harry Cicma is an inductee of the Abbott World Marathon Major Hall of Fame, also referred to as the Abbott World Marathon Major Six Star Hall of Fame. He has medaled in over a dozen Marathons, and in 2025 earned the Legendary Abbott Six Star Medal for completing all Six Major Marathons, including the Boston, New York City, Berlin, London, Chicago and Tokyo Marathons. In doing so, Cicma is a member of the Major Marathon Hall of Fame.

== Personal life ==
Cicma is a Christian and currently lives in West New York, New Jersey, and Miami, Florida
