= 2003 Siebel Open – Singles =

Singles
- 2003 Siebel Open

Final
- Champion: (United States) Andre Agassi
- Runner-up: (Italy) Davide Sanguinetti
- Score: 6–3, 6–1

Details
- Draw: 32 (4Q / 3WC)
- Seeds: 8

Events
Singles	Doubles
← 2002 ·	Pacific Coast Championships	· 2004 →

The 2003 Siebel Open was a men's international tennis tournament. Lleyton Hewitt was the defending champion but did not compete that year.

Andre Agassi won in the final 6–3, 6–1 against Davide Sanguinetti.

== Seeds ==
A champion seed is indicated in bold text while text in italics indicates the round in which that seed was eliminated.

1. (United States) **Andre Agassi (champion)**
2. (Thailand) Paradorn Srichaphan (first round)
3. (United States) James Blake (semifinals)
4. (United States) Jan-Michael Gambill (second round)
5. (United States) Todd Martin (second round)
6. (Italy) Davide Sanguinetti (final)
7. (Russia) Nikolay Davydenko (quarterfinals)
8. (Denmark) Kenneth Carlsen (quarterfinals)

== Draw ==
=== Key ===
- Q = Qualifier
- WC = Wild card
- LL = Lucky loser
- Alt = Alternate
- SE = Special exempt
- PR = Protected ranking
- ITF = ITF entry
- JE = Junior exempt
- w/o = Walkover
- r = Retired
- d = Defaulted
- SR = Special ranking

First round
1	(United States) **A Agassi**	**6**	**6**
WC	(United States) M Chang	4	2
WC	(Australia) **M Philippoussis**	3	**6**	**6**
(Monaco) J-R Lisnard	**6**	3	3
(Czech Republic) J Vacek	4	2
(Belarus) **V Voltchkov**	**6**	**6**
(United States) B Vahaly	4	3
5	(United States) **T Martin**	**6**	**6**
3	(United States) **J Blake**	**6**	**6**
WC	(Zimbabwe) W Black	2	4
(United States) T Dent	2	6^{5}
(South Korea) **H-T Lee**	**6**	**7^{7}**
(Denmark) K Pless	**6**	1	4
(United States) **R Ginepri**	4	**6**	**6**
(United States) J Morrison	3	**6**	6^{1}
7	(Russia) **N Davydenko**	**6**	2	**7^{7}**
6	(Italy) **D Sanguinetti**	**6**	6^{7}	**6**
(Croatia) Ž Krajan	2	**7^{9}**	1
(United States) **M Fish**	**6**	4	**7^{7}**
Q	(Russia) D Tursunov	2	**6**	6^{3}
(United States) **V Spadea**	**6**	**6**
(Germany) L Burgsmüller	3	4
Q	(Australia) T Reid	2	0
4	(United States) **J-M Gambill**	**6**	**6**
8	(Denmark) **K Carlsen**	**7**	3	**7^{7}**
(Sweden) M Norman	5	**6**	6^{3}
Q	(United States) **P Goldstein**	**6**	2	**6**
(Spain) J Balcells	2	**6**	3
(France) M Llodra	**7^{7}**	1	1
Q	(United States) **Z Fleishman**	6^{4}	**6**	**6**
(United States) **J Gimelstob**	**7**	**6**
2	(Thailand) P Srichaphan	5	2

Second round
1	(United States) **A Agassi**	**6**	**6**
WC	(Australia) M Philippoussis	4	1
(Belarus) **V Voltchkov**	**w/o**
5	(United States) T Martin
3	(United States) **J Blake**	**6**	**6**
(South Korea) H-T Lee	3	2
(United States) R Ginepri	4	**6**	3
7	(Russia) **N Davydenko**	**6**	3	**6**
6	(Italy) **D Sanguinetti**	**7^{7}**	**7**
(United States) M Fish	6^{1}	5
(United States) **V Spadea**	**6**	**6**
4	(United States) J-M Gambill	3	3
8	(Denmark) **K Carlsen**	**6**	3	**7**
Q	(United States) P Goldstein	2	**6**	5
Q	(United States) Z Fleishman	1	4
(United States) **J Gimelstob**	**6**	**6**

Quarterfinals
1	(United States) **A Agassi**	6^{3}	**7^{8}**	**6**
(Belarus) V Voltchkov	**7^{7}**	6^{6}	1
3	(United States) **J Blake**	**7**	**6**
7	(Russia) N Davydenko	5	2
6	(Italy) **D Sanguinetti**	**6**	**7**
(United States) V Spadea	1	5
8	(Denmark) K Carlsen	3	4
(United States) **J Gimelstob**	**6**	**6**

Semifinals
1	(United States) **A Agassi**	**6**	**6**
3	(United States) J Blake	4	2
6	(Italy) **D Sanguinetti**	**6**	6^{2}	**6**
(United States) J Gimelstob	4	**7^{7}**	3

Final
1	(United States) **Andre Agassi**	**6**	**6**
6	(Italy) Davide Sanguinetti	3	1
