= 2007 Campbell's Hall of Fame Tennis Championships – Singles =

Singles
- 2007 Campbell's Hall of Fame Tennis Championships

Final
- Champion: (France) Fabrice Santoro
- Runner-up: (France) Nicolas Mahut
- Score: 6–4, 6–4

Details
- Draw: 32
- Seeds: 8

Events
Singles	Doubles
- Campbell's Hall of Fame Tennis Championships

Mark Philippoussis was the defending champion, but did not participate.
Fabrice Santoro defeated Nicolas Mahut in the final 6–4, 6–4.

The event saw first seed Mardy Fish being knocked out of the first round by qualifier Aisam-ul-Haq Qureshi, continuing the tradition of the first seeds never winning the Newport event. Fish had once knocked out the first seed when he was a qualifier.

== Seeds ==
1. (United States) Mardy Fish (first round)
2. (United States) Vince Spadea (quarterfinals)
3. (France) Michaël Llodra (withdrew)
4. (France) Fabrice Santoro (champion)
5. (France) Nicolas Mahut (final)
6. (Russia) Teymuraz Gabashvili (first round)
7. (Russia) Igor Kunitsyn (first round)
8. (Germany) Michael Berrer (second round)

== Draw ==
Key

- Q = Qualifier
- WC = Wild card
- LL = Lucky loser
- Alt = Alternate
- ITF = ITF entry
- PR = Protected ranking
- SR = Special ranking
- SE = Special exempt
- JE = Junior exempt
- JR = Junior Accelerator Programme entrant
- CO = College Accelerator Programme entrant
- NG = Next Gen Accelerator Program entrant
- w/o = Walkover
- r = Retired
- d = Defaulted

=== Finals ===
Semifinals
(Belgium) Dick Norman	4	7^{7}	2
5	(France) Nicolas Mahut	6	6^{2}	6
4	(France) Fabrice Santoro	7^{7}	6
(South Africa) Wesley Moodie	6^{2}	3

Final
5	(France) Nicolas Mahut	4	4
4	(France) Fabrice Santoro	6	6

=== Top half ===
First round
1	(United States) M Fish	3	4
Q	(Pakistan) A Qureshi	6	6
LL	(Australia) N Healey	6	6
Q	(United States) J Levine	1	0
WC	(United States) J Isner	6^{3}	3
(Belgium) D Norman	7^{7}	6
(Australia) C Guccione	4	6^{5}
8	(Germany) M Berrer	6	7^{7}
Q	(India) P Amritraj	3	6	6
(Serbia) I Bozoljac	6	3	3
(Italy) D Bracciali	2	1
WC	(United States) S Jenkins	6	6
Q	(France) A Dupuis	6	6
(Greece) K Economidis	4	3
(Chile) A García	6^{6}	1
5	(France) N Mahut	7^{8}	6

Second round
Q	(Pakistan) A Qureshi	7^{7}	5	6
LL	(Australia) N Healey	6^{2}	7	4
(Belgium) D Norman	6	6^{4}	7^{8}
8	(Germany) M Berrer	2	7^{7}	6^{6}
Q	(India) P Amritraj	6	6
WC	(United States) S Jenkins	4	3
Q	(France) A Dupuis	3	7^{7}	1
5	(France) N Mahut	6	6^{5}	6

Quarterfinals
Q	(Pakistan) A Qureshi	4	6	4
(Belgium) D Norman	6	3	6
Q	(India) P Amritraj	4	6^{4}
5	(France) N Mahut	6	7^{7}

Semifinals
(Belgium) D Norman	4	7^{7}	2
5	(France) N Mahut	6	6^{2}	6

=== Bottom half ===
First round
7	(Russia) I Kunitsyn	1	6	1
(Germany) M Zverev	6	2	6
(United Kingdom) A Bogdanovic	3	6	0
(Thailand) D Udomchoke	6	3	6
(United States) K Kim	3	3
(Canada) F Dancevic	6	6
(Austria) A Peya	4	1
4	(France) F Santoro	6	6
6	(Russia) T Gabashvili	4	3
(Croatia) R Karanušić	6	6
(South Africa) W Moodie	6	6
(Brazil) T Alves	3	4
WC	(Germany) N Kiefer	6^{3}	6	5
(Chile) P Capdeville	7^{7}	4	7
(United States) J Gimelstob	4	3
2	(United States) V Spadea	6	6

Second round
(Germany) M Zverev	2	7	7^{7}
(Thailand) D Udomchoke	6	5	6^{4}
(Canada) F Dancevic	7^{8}	3	4
4	(France) F Santoro	6^{6}	6	6
(Croatia) R Karanušić	4	6	2
(South Africa) W Moodie	6	4	6
(Chile) P Capdeville	3	5
2	(United States) V Spadea	6	7

Quarterfinals
(Germany) M Zverev	4	3
4	(France) F Santoro	6	6
(South Africa) W Moodie	6	6
2	(United States) V Spadea	4	4

Semifinals
4	(France) F Santoro	7^{7}	6
(South Africa) W Moodie	6^{2}	3
