= 2003 Siebel Open =

- Date: February 10–16
- Edition: 115th
- Category: International Series
- Draw: 32S / 16D
- Prize money: $355,000
- Surface: Hard / indoor
- Location: San Jose, U.S.
- Venue: HP Pavilion at San Jose

Champions

Singles
- (United States) Andre Agassi

Doubles
- (South Korea) Hyung-Taik Lee / (Belarus) Vladimir Voltchkov
← 2002 ·	Pacific Coast Championships	· 2004 →

The 2003 Siebel Open was a men's tennis tournament played on indoor hard courts at the HP Pavilion at San Jose in San Jose, California in the United States that was part of the International Series of the 2003 ATP Tour. It was the 115th edition of the tournament and was held from February 10 through February 16, 2003. First-seeded Andre Agassi won the singles title.

== Finals ==
=== Singles ===
(United States) Andre Agassi defeated (Italy) Davide Sanguinetti 6–3, 6–1

- It was Agassi's 2nd title of the year and the 57th of his career.

=== Doubles ===
(South Korea) Hyung-Taik Lee / (Belarus) Vladimir Voltchkov defeated (United States) Paul Goldstein / (United States) Robert Kendrick 7–5, 4–6, 6–3

- It was Lee's 2nd title of the year and the 2nd of his career. It was Voltchkov's only title of the year and the 1st of his career.
