= 2005 SAP Open – Singles =

Singles
- 2005 SAP Open

Final
- Champion: (United States) Andy Roddick
- Runner-up: (France) Cyril Saulnier
- Score: 6–0, 6–4

Details
- Draw: 32 (4Q / 3WC)
- Seeds: 8

Events
Singles	Doubles
← 2004 ·	Pacific Coast Championships	· 2006 →

Andy Roddick was the defending champion, and won in the final 6–0, 6–4, against Cyril Saulnier.

== Seeds ==
1. (United States) Andy Roddick (champion)
2. (United States) Andre Agassi (quarterfinals)
3. (Germany) Tommy Haas (semifinals)
4. (United States) Vince Spadea (quarterfinals)
5. (Czech Republic) Jiří Novák (first round)
6. (United States) Mardy Fish (quarterfinals)
7. (Austria) Jürgen Melzer (semifinals)
8. (Belarus) Max Mirnyi (quarterfinals)

== Main draw ==
=== Key ===
- Q = Qualifier
- WC = Wild card
- LL = Lucky loser
- Alt = Alternate
- SE = Special exempt
- PR = Protected ranking
- ITF = ITF entry
- JE = Junior exempt
- w/o = Walkover
- r = Retired
- d = Defaulted
- SR = Special ranking

=== Finals ===
Semifinals
1	(United States) Andy Roddick	7^{7}	6
3	(Germany) Tommy Haas	6^{3}	3
(France) Cyril Saulnier	6^{3}	6	6
7	(Austria) Jürgen Melzer	7^{7}	3	3

Final
1	(United States) Andy Roddick	6	6
(France) Cyril Saulnier	0	4

=== Top half ===
First round
1	(United States) A Roddick	6	6
Q	(United States) P Goldstein	3	4
(United States) J-M Gambill	3	6^{4}
(South Korea) H-t Lee	6	7^{7}
(United States) R Ginepri	6	6
WC	(United States) D Young	2	2
(Sweden) T Enqvist	7^{8}	6
6	(United States) M Fish	6^{6}	1
3	(Germany) T Haas	6	7^{7}
(France) G Carraz	3	6^{3}
Q	(Canada) F Dancevic	4	7^{7}	6
(United States) J Morrison	6	6^{3}	0
(Czech Republic) J Hernych	5	3
(United States) K Kim	7	6
(Netherlands) P Wessels	7^{8}	6^{4}	3
8	(Belarus) M Mirnyi	6^{6}	7^{7}	6

Second round
1	(United States) A Roddick	6	3	6
(South Korea) H-t Lee	3	6	2
(United States) R Ginepri	3	6^{1}
(Sweden) T Enqvist	6	7^{7}
3	(Germany) T Haas	6	6
Q	(Canada) F Dancevic	1	3
(United States) K Kim	1	5
8	(Belarus) M Mirnyi	6	7

Quarterfinals
1	(United States) A Roddick	3	7^{8}	7
(Sweden) T Enqvist	6	6^{6}	5
3	(Germany) T Haas	6^{2}	7^{7}	6
8	(Belarus) M Mirnyi	7^{7}	6^{3}	2

Semifinals
1	(United States) A Roddick	7^{7}	6
3	(Germany) T Haas	6^{3}	3

=== Bottom half ===
First round
5	(Czech Republic) J Novák	2	2
(France) C Saulnier	6	6
(Germany) P Kohlschreiber	2	3
Q	(Czech Republic) T Zíb	6	6
SE	(South Africa) W Moodie	3	4
WC	(United States) J Blake	6	6
(France) A Dupuis	7	3	2
4	(United States) V Spadea	5	6	6
7	(Austria) J Melzer	6	7
Q	(United States) G Weiner	2	5
(Belgium) X Malisse	6	6
(Taiwan) Y-h Lu	2	3
(Georgia (country)) I Labadze	7^{7}	2	3
(Denmark) K Carlsen	6^{4}	6	6
WC	(United States) B Reynolds	4	4
2	(United States) A Agassi	6	6

Second round
(France) C Saulnier	6	7^{7}
Q	(Czech Republic) T Zíb	1	6^{3}
WC	(United States) J Blake	3	0
4	(United States) V Spadea	6	6
7	(Austria) J Melzer	6	6
(Belgium) X Malisse	3	3
(Denmark) K Carlsen	5	1
2	(United States) A Agassi	7	6

Quarterfinals
(France) C Saulnier	6	6
4	(United States) V Spadea	2	4
7	(Austria) J Melzer	6	6
2	(United States) A Agassi	3	1

Semifinals
(France) C Saulnier	6^{3}	6	6
7	(Austria) J Melzer	7^{7}	3	3
