= 2004 Siebel Open – Singles =

Singles
- 2004 Siebel Open

Final
- Champion: (United States) Andy Roddick
- Runner-up: (United States) Mardy Fish
- Score: 7–6^{(15–13)}, 6–4

Details
- Draw: 32 (4Q / 3WC)
- Seeds: 8

Events
Singles	Doubles
← 2003 ·	Pacific Coast Championships	· 2005 →

Andre Agassi was the defending champion but lost in the semifinals to Mardy Fish.

Andy Roddick won in the final 7–6^{(15–13)}, 6–4 against Fish.

== Seeds ==
A champion seed is indicated in bold text while text in italics indicates the round in which that seed was eliminated.

1. (United States) **Andy Roddick (champion)**
2. (United States) Andre Agassi (semifinals)
3. (United States) Mardy Fish (final)
4. (United States) Taylor Dent (second round)
5. (United States) Robby Ginepri (second round)
6. (United States) Vince Spadea (second round)
7. (United States) James Blake (second round)
8. (South Africa) Wayne Ferreira (first round)

== Draw ==
=== Key ===
- Q = Qualifier
- WC = Wild card
- LL = Lucky loser
- Alt = Alternate
- SE = Special exempt
- PR = Protected ranking
- ITF = ITF entry
- JE = Junior exempt
- w/o = Walkover
- r = Retired
- d = Defaulted
- SR = Special ranking

First round
1	(United States) **A Roddick**	**6**	**6**
(Belgium) C Rochus	4	2
(Belgium) **K Vliegen**	**6**	**6**
(Germany) A Popp	1	3
(Germany) N Kiefer	**7**	5	2
(Sweden) **J Johansson**	5	**7**	**6**
Q	(United States) Z Fleishman	1	3
7	(United States) **J Blake**	**6**	**6**
4	(United States) **T Dent**	**6**	**6**
(United States) P Goldstein	4	4
WC	(United States) **R Kendrick**	**6**	**6**
(Germany) L Burgsmüller	4	2
(France) **C Saulnier**	**6**	**7^{7}**
(United States) B Vahaly	3	6^{4}
Q	(United States) C Mamiit	4	3
WC/5	(United States) **R Ginepri**	**6**	**6**
6	(United States) **V Spadea**	**6**	**6**
WC	(Germany) T Haas	4	2
(South Korea) **H-T Lee**	**7^{7}**	**6**
(Belgium) X Malisse	6^{1}	1
(Austria) J Melzer	3	**6**	3
(Denmark) **K Carlsen**	**6**	4	**6**
Q	(United States) A Reichel	1	4
3	(United States) **M Fish**	**6**	**6**
8	(South Africa) W Ferreira	**7^{14}**	6^{5}	1
(United States) **J-M Gambill**	6^{12}	**7^{7}**	**6**
(Russia) D Tursunov	5	**6**	3
Q	(United States) **K. J. Hippensteel**	**7**	4	**6**
(South Africa) **W Moodie**	**6**	**7^{7}**
(United States) T Martin	4	6^{1}
(Georgia (country)) I Labadze	6^{4}	4
2	(United States) **A Agassi**	**7^{7}**	**6**

Second round
1	(United States) **A Roddick**	**6**	**6**
(Belgium) K Vliegen	2	3
(Sweden) **J Johansson**	**6**	**6**
7	(United States) J Blake	4	2
4	(United States) T Dent	4	4
WC	(United States) **R Kendrick**	**6**	**6**
(France) **C Saulnier**	3	**7**	**6**
WC/5	(United States) R Ginepri	**6**	5	4
6	(United States) V Spadea	**6**	4	4
(South Korea) **H-T Lee**	2	**6**	**6**
(Denmark) K Carlsen	3	**6**	6^{2}
3	(United States) **M Fish**	**6**	3	**7^{7}**
(United States) **J-M Gambill**	**6**	**6**
Q	(United States) K. J. Hippensteel	3	2
(South Africa) W Moodie	6^{6}	4
2	(United States) **A Agassi**	**7^{8}**	**6**

Quarterfinals
1	(United States) **A Roddick**	**6**	**7^{9}**
(Sweden) J Johansson	3	6^{7}
WC	(United States) **R Kendrick**	**7^{8}**	4	**6**
(France) C Saulnier	6^{6}	**6**	3
(South Korea) H-T Lee	2	3
(United States) **M Fish**	**6**	**6**
(United States) J-M Gambill	6^{4}	5
2	(United States) **A Agassi**	**7^{7}**	**7**

Semifinals
1	(United States) **A Roddick**	**7^{7}**	**6**
WC	(United States) R Kendrick	6^{3}	2
3	(United States) **M Fish**	5	**6**	**6**
2	(United States) A Agassi	**7**	4	2

Final
1	(United States) **Andy Roddick**	**7^{15}**	**6**
3	(United States) Mardy Fish	6^{13}	4
