= 2008 Hall of Fame Tennis Championships – Singles =

Singles
- 2008 Hall of Fame Tennis Championships

Final
- Champion: (France) Fabrice Santoro
- Runner-up: (India) Prakash Amritraj
- Score: 6–3, 7–5

Details
- Draw: 28 (4Q / 3WC)
- Seeds: 8

Events
Singles	Doubles
- Hall of Fame Tennis Championships

Fabrice Santoro was the defending champion, and won in the final 6–3, 7–5, against Prakash Amritraj.

== Seeds ==
The top four seeds receive a bye into the second round.

1. (United States) Mardy Fish (second round)
2. (France) Fabrice Santoro (champion)
3. (France) Nicolas Mahut (second round)
4. (Russia) Igor Kunitsyn (quarterfinals)
5. (United States) John Isner (first round)
6. (United States) Donald Young (second round)
7. (Canada) Frank Dancevic (semifinals)
8. (South Africa) Kevin Anderson (second round)

== Draw ==
Key

- Q = Qualifier
- WC = Wild card
- LL = Lucky loser
- Alt = Alternate
- ITF = ITF entry
- PR = Protected ranking
- SR = Special ranking
- SE = Special exempt
- JE = Junior exempt
- JR = Junior Accelerator Programme entrant
- CO = College Accelerator Programme entrant
- NG = Next Gen Accelerator Program entrant
- w/o = Walkover
- r = Retired
- d = Defaulted

=== Finals ===
Semifinals
WC	(India) Prakash Amritraj	7	4	6
7	(Canada) Frank Dancevic	6^{4}	6	3
(United States) Vincent Spadea	6^{4}	1
2	(France) Fabrice Santoro	7	6

Final
WC	(India) Prakash Amritraj	3	5
2	(France) Fabrice Santoro	6	7

=== Top half ===
First round
(United States) K Kim	3	4
Q	(India) R Bopanna	6	6
WC	(India) P Amritraj	6^{3}	6	6
(Australia) J Sirianni	7	4	4
(United States) J Levine	6	6
5	(United States) J Isner	3	1
(Russia) M Ledovskikh	4	7	6
(Denmark) K Pless	6	5	4
(Chile) P Capdeville	4	6	1
Q	(United States) B Evans	6	3	6
WC	(United States) T Dent	6	5	1
7	(Canada) F Dancevic	3	7	6

Second round
1	(United States) M Fish	6^{6}	5
Q	(India) R Bopanna	7	7
WC	(India) P Amritraj	7	6
(United States) J Levine	5	3
4	(Russia) I Kunitsyn	6	6
(Russia) M Ledovskikh	1	1
Q	(United States) B Evans	7	4	6^{3}
7	(Canada) F Dancevic	5	6	7

Quarterfinals
Q	(India) R Bopanna	4	3
WC	(India) P Amritraj	6	6
4	(Russia) I Kunitsyn	5	3
7	(Canada) F Dancevic	7	6

Semifinals
WC	(India) P Amritraj	7	4	6
7	(Canada) F Dancevic	6^{4}	6	3

=== Bottom half ===
First round
6/WC	(United States) D Young	6	2	6
Q	(South Korea) W-s Jun	3	6	4
Q	(Austria) A Peya	6^{3}	6	7
(Germany) P Petzschner	7	3	5
(Germany) S Stadler	2	6	4
(United States) V Spadea	6	3	6
8	(South Africa) K Anderson	6^{3}	6	6
(Luxembourg) G Müller	7	3	3
(Spain) I Navarro	7	6
(South Africa) R de Voest	5	4
(Germany) B Becker	5	6^{5}
(Pakistan) A-u-H Qureshi	7	7

Second round
6/WC	(United States) D Young	6^{4}	3
Q	(Austria) A Peya	7	6
(United States) V Spadea	6	6
3	(France) N Mahut	2	3
8	(South Africa) K Anderson	6^{3}	6	4
(Spain) I Navarro	7	3	6
(Pakistan) A-u-H Qureshi	6^{4}	2
2	(France) F Santoro	7	6

Quarterfinals
Q	(Austria) A Peya	6^{3}	5
(United States) V Spadea	7	7
(Spain) I Navarro	3	6^{4}
2	(France) F Santoro	6	7

Semifinals
(United States) V Spadea	6^{4}	1
2	(France) F Santoro	7	6
