= 2003 Siebel Open – Doubles =

Doubles
- 2003 Siebel Open

Final
- Champions: (South Korea) Hyung-Taik Lee (Belarus) Vladimir Voltchkov
- Runners-up: (United States) Paul Goldstein (United States) Robert Kendrick
- Score: 7–5, 4–6, 6–3

Details
- Draw: 16
- Seeds: 4

Events
Singles	Doubles
← 2002 ·	Pacific Coast Championships	· 2004 →

Wayne Black and Kevin Ullyett were the defending champions but only Black competed that year with Mark Philippoussis.

Black and Philippoussis lost in the quarterfinals to Davide Sanguinetti and Jim Thomas.

Hyung-Taik Lee and Vladimir Voltchkov won in the final 7–5, 4–6, 6–3 against Paul Goldstein and Robert Kendrick.

== Seeds ==
Champion seeds are indicated in bold text while text in italics indicates the round in which those seeds were eliminated.

1. (United States) Bob Bryan / (United States) Mike Bryan (first round)
2. (South Africa) Chris Haggard / (United States) Brian MacPhie (first round)
3. (United States) Jan-Michael Gambill / (United States) Graydon Oliver (semifinals)
4. (The Bahamas) Mark Merklein / (Japan) Thomas Shimada (first round)

== Draw ==
=== Key ===
- Q = Qualifier
- WC = Wild card
- LL = Lucky loser
- Alt = Alternate
- SE = Special exempt
- PR = Protected ranking
- ITF = ITF entry
- JE = Junior exempt
- w/o = Walkover
- r = Retired
- d = Defaulted
- SR = Special ranking

First round
1	(United States) B Bryan (United States) M Bryan	**7**	3	5
(South Korea) **H-T Lee** (Belarus) **V Voltchkov**	5	**6**	**7**
WC	(India) **P Amritraj** (India) **S Amritraj**	**6**	**6**
(Spain) J Balcells (Denmark) K Carlsen	1	4
3	(United States) **J-M Gambill** (United States) **G Oliver**	**6**	**6**
(United States) J Gimelstob (United States) S Humphries	3	4
(Russia) N Davydenko (Denmark) K Pless	5	1	r
(South Africa) **J-L de Jager** (South Africa) **M Wakefield**	**7**	**2**
(United States) J Blake (United States) T Martin	3	3
(Italy) **D Sanguinetti** (United States) **J Thomas**	**6**	**6**
(Zimbabwe) **W Black** (Australia) **M Philippoussis**	4	**6**	**6**
4	(The Bahamas) M Merklein (Japan) T Shimada	**6**	3	4
(United States) M Fish (United States) J Morrison	**6**	3	3
WC	(United States) **P Goldstein** (United States) **R Kendrick**	4	**6**	**6**
(United States) **R Ginepri** (United States) **B Vahaly**	2	**6**	**6**
2	(South Africa) C Haggard (United States) B MacPhie	**6**	4	4

Quarterfinals
(South Korea) **H-T Lee** (Belarus) **V Voltchkov**	**6**	**6**
WC	(India) P Amritraj (India) S Amritraj	2	4
3	(United States) **J-M Gambill** (United States) **G Oliver**	**6**	**7^{7}**
(South Africa) J-L de Jager (South Africa) M Wakefield	3	6^{4}
(Italy) **D Sanguinetti** (United States) **J Thomas**	**7^{9}**	**6**
(Zimbabwe) W Black (Australia) M Philippoussis	6^{7}	4
WC	(United States) **P Goldstein** (United States) **R Kendrick**	**6**	4	**6**
(United States) R Ginepri (United States) B Vahaly	4	**6**	2

Semifinals
(South Korea) **H-T Lee** (Belarus) **V Voltchkov**	**6**	**7^{7}**
3	(United States) J-M Gambill (United States) G Oliver	4	6^{1}
(Italy) D Sanguinetti (United States) J Thomas	3	4
WC	(United States) **P Goldstein** (United States) **R Kendrick**	**6**	**6**

Final
(South Korea) **Hyung-Taik Lee** (Belarus) **Vladimir Voltchkov**	**7**	4	**6**
WC	(United States) Paul Goldstein (United States) Robert Kendrick	5	**6**	3
