= 2005 SAP Open =

Tennis tournament

- Date: February 7–13
- Edition: 117th
- Category: ATP International Series
- Draw: 32S / 16D
- Prize money: $355,000
- Surface: Hard / indoor
- Location: San Jose, California, U.S.
- Venue: HP Pavilion at San Jose

Champions

Singles
- (United States) Andy Roddick

Doubles
- (Australia) Wayne Arthurs / (Australia) Paul Hanley
← 2004 ·	Pacific Coast Championships	· 2006 →

The 2005 SAP Open was a men's tennis tournament played on indoor hard courts. It was the 117th edition of the event and was part of the International Series of the 2005 ATP Tour. It took place at the HP Pavilion in San Jose, United States, from February 7 through February 13, 2005. First-seeded Andy Roddick won his second consecutive singles title at the event.

== Finals ==
=== Singles ===
(United States) Andy Roddick defeated (France) Cyril Saulnier, 6–0, 6–4

- It was Roddick's 1st singles title of the year and the 16th of his career.

=== Doubles ===
(Australia) Wayne Arthurs / (Australia) Paul Hanley defeated (Switzerland) Yves Allegro / (Germany) Michael Kohlmann, 7–6^{(7–4)}, 6–4
