= 2004 BNP Paribas Masters – Singles =

Singles
- 2004 BNP Paribas Masters

Final
- Champion: (Russia) Marat Safin
- Runner-up: (Czech Republic) Radek Štěpánek
- Score: 6–3, 7–6^{(7–5)}, 6–3

Details
- Draw: 48 (6 Q / 3 WC / 3 LL)
- Seeds: 18

Events
Singles	Doubles
- Paris Masters

Marat Safin defeated qualifier Radek Štěpánek in the final, 6–3, 7–6^{(7–5)}, 6–3 to win the singles tennis title at the 2004 Paris Masters. It was his third Paris Masters title and 14th career singles title overall. Safin also became the first man to win the final two Masters tournaments of the season, after the Madrid Masters the week before.

Tim Henman was the defending champion, but lost in the third round to Mikhail Youzhny.

== Seeds ==
A champion seed is indicated in bold text while text in italics indicates the round in which that seed was eliminated. All sixteen seeds received a bye into the second round.

1. (United States) Andy Roddick (third round)
2. (Australia) Lleyton Hewitt (quarterfinals)
3. (United Kingdom) Tim Henman (third round)
4. (Spain) ~~Carlos Moyá~~ (withdrew due to a shoulder injury)
5. (United States) ~~Andre Agassi~~ (withdrew)
6. (Russia) **Marat Safin (champion)**
7. (Argentina) Gastón Gaudio (second round)
8. (Argentina) ~~David Nalbandian~~ (withdrew due to a left knee injury)
9. (Sweden) ~~Joachim Johansson~~ (withdrew due to a virus)
10. (Spain) Tommy Robredo (second round)
11. (Romania) Andrei Pavel (third round)
12. (Slovakia) Dominik Hrbatý (second round)
13. (Argentina) Guillermo Cañas (semifinals)
14. (Chile) Nicolás Massú (third round)
15. (Chile) Fernando González (second round)
16. (Czech Republic) Jiří Novák (second round)
17. (United States) Vincent Spadea (third round)
18. (Germany) Tommy Haas (third round)

== Draw ==
Key

- Q = Qualifier
- WC = Wild card
- LL = Lucky loser
- Alt = Alternate
- ITF = ITF entry
- PR = Protected ranking
- SR = Special ranking
- SE = Special exempt
- JE = Junior exempt
- JR = Junior Accelerator Programme entrant
- CO = College Accelerator Programme entrant
- NG = Next Gen Accelerator Program entrant
- w/o = Walkover
- r = Retired
- d = Defaulted

=== Finals ===
Quarterfinals
Q	**(Belarus) Max Mirnyi**	6^{5}	**6**	**7^{7}**
(Sweden) Robin Söderling	**7^{7}**	4	6^{5}
(Russia) Mikhail Youzhny	6^{1}	3
Q	**(Czech Republic) Radek Štěpánek**	**7^{7}**	**6**
(Spain) Feliciano López	3	3
13	**(Argentina) Guillermo Cañas**	**6**	**6**
6	**(Russia) Marat Safin**	**6**	**7^{7}**
2	(Australia) Lleyton Hewitt	4	6^{2}

Semifinals
Q	(Belarus) Max Mirnyi	**6**	6^{1}	4
Q	**(Czech Republic) Radek Štěpánek**	3	**7^{7}**	**6**
13	(Argentina) Guillermo Cañas	2	6^{5}
6	**(Russia) Marat Safin**	**6**	**7^{7}**

Final
Q	(Czech Republic) Radek Štěpánek	3	6^{5}	3
6	**(Russia) Marat Safin**	**6**	**7^{7}**	**6**

=== Top half ===
==== Section 1 ====
First round
(Sweden) T Johansson	5	2
(Armenia) **S Sargsian**	**7**	**6**
(Morocco) H Arazi	3	0
Q	(Belarus) **M Mirnyi**	**6**	**6**
(Peru) L Horna	6^{6}	6^{0}
WC	(France) **C Saulnier**	**7^{8}**	**7^{7}**
(Sweden) **R Söderling**	**6**	**6**
(United States) T Dent	2	4

Second round
1	(United States) **A Roddick**	**6**	**6**
(Armenia) S Sargsian	2	2
Q	(Belarus) **M Mirnyi**	**7^{10}**	**6**
15	(Chile) F González	6^{8}	3
12	(Slovakia) D Hrbatý	6^{4}	2
WC	(France) **C Saulnier**	**7^{7}**	**6**
(Sweden) **R Söderling**	4	**7^{8}**	**6**
LL	(Italy) D Sanguinetti	**6**	6^{6}	0

Third round
1	(United States) A Roddick	6^{2}	2
Q	(Belarus) **M Mirnyi**	**7^{7}**	**6**
WC	(France) C Saulnier	6^{4}	2
(Sweden) **R Söderling**	**7^{7}**	**6**

Quarterfinals
Q	(Belarus) **M Mirnyi**	6^{5}	**6**	**7^{7}**
(Sweden) R Söderling	**7^{7}**	4	6^{5}

==== Section 2 ====
First round
Alt	(Argentina) M Zabaleta	6^{3}	4
(Thailand) **P Srichaphan**	**7^{7}**	**6**
(Sweden) J Björkman	2	6^{2}
(Russia) **M Youzhny**	**6**	**7^{7}**
(Russia) **N Davydenko**	**6**	**6**
(Spain) F Verdasco	2	3
Q	(Czech Republic) **R Štěpánek**	**7^{7}**	**6**
(France) M Llodra	6^{2}	1

Second round
3	(United Kingdom) **T Henman**	**6**	**6**
(Thailand) P Srichaphan	3	4
(Russia) **M Youzhny**	**6**	**7**
16	(Czech Republic) J Novák	3	5
17	(United States) **V Spadea**	**7^{7}**	**6**
(Russia) N Davydenko	6^{4}	0
Q	(Czech Republic) **R Štěpánek**	**6**	**6**
LL	(Romania) V Hănescu	4	1

Third round
3	(United Kingdom) T Henman	5	1
(Russia) **M Youzhny**	**7**	**6**
17	(United States) V Spadea	2	3
Q	(Czech Republic) **R Štěpánek**	**6**	**6**

Quarterfinals
(Russia) M Youzhny	6^{1}	3
Q	(Czech Republic) **R Štěpánek**	**7^{7}**	**6**

=== Bottom half ===
==== Section 3 ====
First round
(Spain) **F López**	**7^{7}**	**6**
(Germany) R Schüttler	6^{3}	4
(United States) **M Fish**	**6**	3	**6**
(Spain) D Ferrer	3	**6**	2
Q	(France) **J-W Tsonga**	4	**7^{7}**	**6**
(Croatia) M Ančić	**6**	6^{5}	3
LL	(Belgium) **X Malisse**	**7**	**6**
WC	(France) P-H Mathieu	5	4

Second round
7	(Argentina) G Gaudio	5	**6**	1
(Spain) **F López**	**7**	3	**6**
(United States) M Fish	6^{3}	4
11	(Romania) **A Pavel**	**7^{7}**	**6**
13	(Argentina) **G Cañas**	**6**	**6**
Q	(France) J-W Tsonga	1	3
LL	(Belgium) X Malisse	1	6^{1}
18	(Germany) **T Haas**	**6**	**7^{7}**

Third round
(Spain) **F López**	5	**6**	**6**
11	(Romania) A Pavel	**7**	4	4
13	(Argentina) **G Cañas**	**7^{7}**	**6**
18	(Germany) T Haas	6^{4}	2

Quarterfinals
(Spain) F López	3	3
13	(Argentina) **G Cañas**	**6**	**6**

==== Section 4 ====
First round
(Croatia) **I Ljubičić**	**6**	**7^{7}**
WC	(France) A Clément	3	6^{4}
(Austria) **J Melzer**	**6**	**6**
(Argentina) J I Chela	1	4
(Italy) F Volandri	**6**	4	1^{r}
Q	(Belgium) **C Rochus**	2	**6**	4
Q	(Sweden) T Enqvist	**6**	4	3
Q	(France) **G Monfils**	1	**6**	**6**

Second round
6	(Russia) **M Safin**	6^{1}	**6**	**7**
(Croatia) I Ljubičić	**7^{7}**	3	5
(Austria) **J Melzer**	**6**	3	**6**
10	(Spain) T Robredo	3	**6**	1
14	(Chile) **N Massú**	**6**	**7^{7}**
Q	(Belgium) C Rochus	2	6^{4}
Q	(France) G Monfils	3	6^{3}
2	(Australia) **L Hewitt**	**6**	**7^{7}**

Third round
6	(Russia) **M Safin**	**6**	**7**
(Austria) J Melzer	2	5
14	(Chile) N Massú	3^{r}
2	(Australia) **L Hewitt**	4

Quarterfinals
6	(Russia) **M Safin**	**6**	**7^{7}**
2	(Australia) L Hewitt	4	6^{2}

== Qualifying ==
=== Qualifying seeds ===
1. (Belgium) Xavier Malisse (qualifying competition, **lucky loser**)
2. (Argentina) ~~Mariano Zabaleta~~ (moved to the main draw)
3. (Croatia) Ivo Karlović (first round, retired due to a left foot injury)
4. (Czech Republic) **Radek Štěpánek (qualified)**
5. (Belarus) **Max Mirnyi (qualified)**
6. (Sweden) **Thomas Enqvist (qualified)**
7. (Belgium) Olivier Rochus (first round)
8. (Italy) Potito Starace (first round)
9. (France) Antony Dupuis (first round)
10. (Romania) Victor Hănescu (qualifying competition, **lucky loser**)
11. (France) Grégory Carraz (first round)
12. (Italy) Davide Sanguinetti (qualifying competition, **lucky loser**)

=== Qualifiers ===
1. (France) **Jo-Wilfried Tsonga**
2. (Belgium) **Christophe Rochus**
3. (France) **Gaël Monfils**
4. (Czech Republic) **Radek Štěpánek**
5. (Belarus) **Max Mirnyi**
6. (Sweden) **Thomas Enqvist**

=== Lucky losers ===
1. (Belgium) **Xavier Malisse**
2. (Romania) **Victor Hănescu**
3. (Italy) **Davide Sanguinetti**

=== Qualifying draws ===
==== First qualifier ====
First round
1	**(Belgium) Xavier Malisse**	3	**6**	**6**
WC	(France) Édouard Roger-Vasselin	**6**	2	3
WC	**(France) Jo-Wilfried Tsonga**	**7^{7}**	**6**
8	(Italy) Potito Starace	6^{1}	2

Qualifying competition
1	(Belgium) Xavier Malisse	**6**	6^{6}	3
WC	**(France) Jo-Wilfried Tsonga**	2	**7^{8}**	**6**

==== Second qualifier ====
First round
Alt	(France) Marc Gicquel	3	4
**(France) Thierry Ascione**	**6**	**6**
**(Belgium) Christophe Rochus**	**6**	**6**
11	(France) Grégory Carraz	3	2

Qualifying competition
(France) Thierry Ascione	5	4
**(Belgium) Christophe Rochus**	**7**	**6**

==== Third qualifier ====
First round
3	(Croatia) Ivo Karlović	6^{10}	r
**(France) Nicolas Mahut**	**7^{12}**
WC	**(France) Gaël Monfils**	4	**6**	**6**
9	(France) Antony Dupuis	**6**	3	4

Qualifying competition
(France) Nicolas Mahut	**7^{7}**	2	0
WC	**(France) Gaël Monfils**	6^{5}	**6**	**6**

==== Fourth qualifier ====
First round
4	**(Czech Republic) Radek Štěpánek**	**6**	**6**
(Belgium) Kristof Vliegen	3	0
(France) Olivier Mutis	2	4
12	**(Italy) Davide Sanguinetti**	**6**	**6**

Qualifying competition
4	**(Czech Republic) Radek Štěpánek**	**7**	1	**6**
12	(Italy) Davide Sanguinetti	5	**6**	3

==== Fifth qualifier ====
First round
5	**(Belarus) Max Mirnyi**	**7^{11}**	**7**
Alt	(France) Richard Gasquet	6^{9}	5
(Spain) Àlex Corretja	2	6^{3}
10	**(Romania) Victor Hănescu**	**6**	**7^{7}**

Qualifying competition
5	**(Belarus) Max Mirnyi**	**6**	**6**
10	(Romania) Victor Hănescu	3	2

==== Sixth qualifier ====
First round
6	**(Sweden) Thomas Enqvist**	**6**	**6**
Alt	(France) Jean-René Lisnard	2	3
WC	**(France) Jérôme Haehnel**	**6**	**7**
7	(Belgium) Olivier Rochus	3	5

Qualifying competition
6	**(Sweden) Thomas Enqvist**	6^{2}	**6**	**7**
WC	(France) Jérôme Haehnel	**7^{7}**	4	5
