= 2008 Hall of Fame Tennis Championships – Doubles =

Doubles
- 2008 Hall of Fame Tennis Championships

Final
- Champions: (United States) Mardy Fish (United States) John Isner
- Runners-up: (India) Rohan Bopanna (Pakistan) Aisam-ul-Haq Qureshi
- Score: 6–4, 7–6^{(7–1)}

Events
Singles	Doubles
- Hall of Fame Tennis Championships

Jordan Kerr and Jim Thomas were the defending champions, but chose not to participate that year.

Mardy Fish and John Isner won in the final 6–4, 7–6^{(7–1)} against Rohan Bopanna and Aisam-ul-Haq Qureshi

== Seeds ==
1. (France) Nicolas Mahut / (France) Fabrice Santoro (first round)
2. (United States) Scott Lipsky / (United States) David Martin (first round)
3. (Thailand) Sanchai Ratiwatana / (Thailand) Sonchat Ratiwatana (first round)
4. (India) Rohan Bopanna / (Pakistan) Aisam-ul-Haq Qureshi (final)

== Draw ==
Key

- Q = Qualifier
- WC = Wild card
- LL = Lucky loser
- Alt = Alternate
- ITF = ITF entry
- PR = Protected ranking
- SR = Special ranking
- SE = Special exempt
- JE = Junior exempt
- JR = Junior Accelerator Programme entrant
- CO = College Accelerator Programme entrant
- NG = Next Gen Accelerator Program entrant
- w/o = Walkover
- r = Retired
- d = Defaulted

=== Draw ===
First round
1	(France) N Mahut (France) F Santoro	6^{7}	3
(United States) M Fish (United States) J Isner	7	6
(Russia) I Kunitsyn (United States) V Spadea	1	7	[7]
(Chile) P Capdeville (Spain) I Navarro	6	5	[10]
3	(Thailand) S Ratiwatana (Thailand) S Ratiwatana	7	4	[7]
(Germany) P Petzschner (Austria) A Peya	6^{3}	6	[10]
(Australia) J Sirianni (Germany) S Stadler	6	6
(Canada) F Dancevic (United States) J Levine	4	0
(South Africa) K Anderson (United States) J Cerretani	6^{4}	6	[10]
(Germany) B Becker (Denmark) K Pless	7	2	[4]
(United States) T Phillips (United States) J Thomas	6	3	[2]
4	(India) R Bopanna (Pakistan) A-u-H Qureshi	4	6	[10]
(South Africa) R de Voest (Australia) A Fisher	7	7
WC	(United States) B Battistone (United States) D Battistone	6^{1}	5
WC	(India) P Amritraj (Luxembourg) G Müller	7	3	[10]
2	(United States) S Lipsky (United States) D Martin	6^{4}	6	[7]

Quarterfinals
(United States) M Fish (United States) J Isner	7	6
(Chile) P Capdeville (Spain) I Navarro	6^{2}	0
(Germany) P Petzschner (Austria) A Peya	3	7	[10]
(Australia) J Sirianni (Germany) S Stadler	6	5	[7]
(South Africa) K Anderson (United States) J Cerretani	6^{4}	6	[7]
4	(India) R Bopanna (Pakistan) A-u-H Qureshi	7	3	[10]
(South Africa) R de Voest (Australia) A Fisher	6	6
WC	(India) P Amritraj (Luxembourg) G Müller	4	2

Semifinals
(United States) M Fish (United States) J Isner	7	4	[10]
(Germany) P Petzschner (Austria) A Peya	6^{4}	6	[7]
4	(India) R Bopanna (Pakistan) A-u-H Qureshi	5	6	[11]
(South Africa) R de Voest (Australia) A Fisher	7	4	[9]

Final
(United States) M Fish (United States) J Isner	6	7
4	(India) R Bopanna (Pakistan) A-u-H Qureshi	4	6^{1}
