= 2004 Siebel Open =

- Date: February 9–15
- Edition: 116th
- Category: International Series
- Draw: 32S / 16D
- Prize money: $355,000
- Surface: Hard / indoor
- Location: San Jose, U.S.
- Venue: HP Pavilion at San Jose

Champions

Singles
- (United States) Andy Roddick

Doubles
- (United States) James Blake / (United States) Mardy Fish
← 2003 ·	Pacific Coast Championships	· 2005 →

The 2004 Siebel Open was a men's tennis tournament played on indoor hard courts at the HP Pavilion at San Jose in San Jose, California in the United States that was part of the International Series of the 2004 ATP Tour. The tournament ran from February 9 through February 15, 2004. First-seeded Andy Roddick won the singles title.

== Finals ==
=== Singles ===
(United States) Andy Roddick defeated (United States) Mardy Fish 7–6^{(15–13)}, 6–4

- It was Roddick's 1st title of the year and the 14th of his career.

=== Doubles ===
(United States) James Blake / (United States) Mardy Fish defeated (United States) Rick Leach / (United States) Brian MacPhie 6–2, 7–5

- It was Blake's 1st title of the year and the 4th of his career. It was Fish's 1st title of the year and the 3rd of his career.
