= 2008 Hall of Fame Tennis Championships =

- Date: July 7–13
- Edition: 33rd
- Category: International Series
- Draw: 32S / 16D
- Prize money: $360,000
- Surface: Grass / outdoor
- Location: Newport, Rhode Island, US
- Venue: International Tennis Hall of Fame

Champions

Singles
- (France) Fabrice Santoro

Doubles
- (United States) Mardy Fish / (United States) John Isner
- Hall of Fame Tennis Championships

The 2008 Hall of Fame Tennis Championships (also known as the Campbell's Hall of Fame Tennis Championships for sponsorship reasons) was a men's tennis tournament played on outdoor grass courts. It was the 33rd edition of the Hall of Fame Tennis Championships, and was part of the International Series of the 2008 ATP Tour. It took place at the International Tennis Hall of Fame in Newport, Rhode Island, United States, from July 7 through July 13, 2008.

The singles field was led by Hamburg Masters doubles semifinalist and Indian Wells Masters singles finalist Mardy Fish, Sydney semifinalist and Newport defending champion Fabrice Santoro, and Marseille quarterfinalist Nicolas Mahut. Other seeded players were Pörtschach semifinalist Igor Kunitsyn, San Jose quarterfinalist John Isner, Donald Young, Frank Dancevic and Kevin Anderson.

== Finals ==
=== Singles ===
(France) Fabrice Santoro defeated (India) Prakash Amritraj 6–3, 7–5

- It was Fabrice Santoro's 1st title of the year, and his 6th overall. It was his 2nd consecutive win at the event.

=== Doubles ===
(United States) Mardy Fish / (United States) 'John Isner defeated (India) Rohan Bopanna / (Pakistan) Aisam-ul-Haq Qureshi 6–4, 7–6^{(7–1)}
