= 2007 Campbell's Hall of Fame Tennis Championships =

Tennis tournament

- Date: July, 9–15
- Edition: 32nd
- Category: International Series
- Surface: Grass / Outdoor
- Location: Newport, Rhode Island, United States

Champions

Singles
- (France) Fabrice Santoro

Doubles
- (Australia) Jordan Kerr / (United States) Jim Thomas
- Hall of Fame Open

The 2007 Hall of Fame Tennis Championships (also known as the Campbell's Hall of Fame Tennis Championships for sponsorship reasons) was a men's tennis tournament played on outdoor grass courts. It was the 32nd edition of the Hall of Fame Tennis Championships, and was part of the International Series of the 2007 ATP Tour. It took place at the International Tennis Hall of Fame in Newport, Rhode Island, United States, from July 9 through July 15, 2007.

== Finals ==
=== Singles ===
(France) Fabrice Santoro defeated (France) Nicolas Mahut 6–4, 6–4

=== Doubles ===
(Australia) Jordan Kerr / (United States) Jim Thomas defeated (Australia) Nathan Healey / (Russia) Igor Kunitsyn 6–3, 7–5
