= Vladimir Voltchkov =

Belarusian tennis player

Vladimir Voltchkov Uładzimir Vałčkoŭ Уладзімір Валчкоў Владимир Волчков
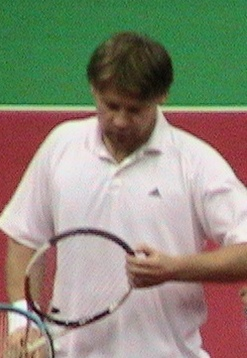
- Country (sports): Belarus
- Residence: Minsk, Belarus
- Born: April 7, 1978 (age 48) Minsk, Soviet Union
- Height: 1.80 m (5 ft 11 in)
- Turned pro: 1995
- Retired: 2008
- Plays: Right-handed (two-handed backhand)
- Prize money: $1,315,133

Singles
- Career record: 70–91
- Career titles: 0
- Highest ranking: No. 25 (30 April 2001)

Grand Slam singles results
- Australian Open: 2R (2002)
- French Open: 2R (2004)
- Wimbledon: SF (2000)
- US Open: 2R (2001)

Other tournaments
- Olympic Games: 2R (2000)

Doubles
- Career record: 41–43
- Career titles: 1
- Highest ranking: No. 71 (9 June 2003)

Grand Slam doubles results
- Australian Open: 2R (2003)
- French Open: 2R (2003)
- Wimbledon: SF (2001)
- US Open: 2R (2001)

Other doubles tournaments
- Olympic Games: 2R (2004)

Team competitions
- Davis Cup: SF (2004)
- Last updated on: 31 December 2021.

Vladimir Nikolayevich Voltchkov (Belarusian: Уладзімір Мікалаевіч Валчкоў, romanized: Uładzimir Mikałajevič Vałčkoŭ; Russian: Владимир Николаевич Волчков; born April 7, 1978) is a Belarusian former professional tennis player. Voltchkov reached the semifinals at the 2000 Wimbledon Championships, where, as a qualifier, he lost to Pete Sampras in straight sets. He represented Belarus in both the Davis Cup and the Olympic Games in 2000, also won the Wimbledon juniors competition in 1996. His career-high singles ranking is world No. 25.

== Tennis career ==
=== Juniors ===
Voltchkov had excellent results as a junior, capturing the Wimbledon juniors title by defeating Ivan Ljubičić in 1996. He compiled a singles win–loss record of 69–34, reaching as high as No. 7 in the world in 1996.

Junior Grand Slam results:

- Australian Open: –
- French Open: 3R (1996)
- Wimbledon: W (1996)
- US Open: 3R (1995, 1996)

=== Pro tour ===
His highest achievement came in 2000, inspired by the film Gladiator. After watching the movie four times, he reached the semifinals of the Wimbledon Championships as a qualifier, causing the British press to dub him "The Vladiator". En route to the semifinals, he beat Juan Ignacio Chela, Cédric Pioline, Younes El Aynaoui, Wayne Ferreira and Byron Black, then lost to eventual champion Pete Sampras. Voltchkov has a 30–16 career Davis Cup record (17–11 in singles).

== Junior Grand Slam finals ==
=== Singles: 1 (1 title) ===
Result	Year	Tournament	Surface	Opponent	Score
Win	1996	Wimbledon	Grass	(Croatia) Ivan Ljubičić	3–6, 6–2, 6–3

== ATP career finals ==
=== Singles: 1 (1 runner-up) ===
Legend Grand Slam Tournaments (0–0) ATP World Tour Finals (0–0) ATP World Tour Masters Series (0–0) ATP Championship Series (0–0) ATP World Series (0–1)	Finals by surface Hard (0–1) Clay (0–0) Grass (0–0) Carpet (0–0)	Finals by setting Outdoors (0–1) Indoors (0–0)

Result	W–L	Date	Tournament	Tier	Surface	Opponent	Score
Loss	0–1	Sep 2002	Tashkent, Uzbekistan	World Series	Hard	(Russia) Yevgeny Kafelnikov	6–7^{(6–8)}, 5–7

=== Doubles: 1 (1 title) ===
Legend Grand Slam tournaments (0–0) ATP World Tour Finals (0–0) ATP World Tour Masters 1000 (0–0) ATP World Tour 500 Series (0–0) ATP World Tour 250 Series (1–0)	Titles by surface Hard (1–0) Clay (0–0) Grass (0–0) Carpet (0–0)	Titles by setting Outdoor (1–0) Indoor (0–0)

Result	W–L	Date	Tournament	Tier	Surface	Partner	Opponents	Score
Win	1–0	Feb 2003	San Jose, United States	World Series	Hard	(South Korea) Hyung-Taik Lee	(United States) Paul Goldstein (United States) Robert Kendrick	7–5, 4–6, 6–3

== ATP Challenger and ITF Futures finals ==
=== Singles: 15 (13–2) ===
Legend ATP Challenger (8–2) ITF Futures (5–0)	Finals by surface Hard (7–0) Clay (3–0) Grass (1–0) Carpet (2–2)

Result	W–L	Date	Tournament	Tier	Surface	Opponent	Score
Win	1–0	Mar 1998	Israel F2, Ashkelon	Futures	Hard	(Israel) Eyal Erlich	7–5, 6–4
Win	2–0	Nov 1998	Puebla, Mexico	Challenger	Hard	(Belgium) Christophe Rochus	6–3, 6–3
Win	3–0	Feb 1999	Hamburg, Germany	Challenger	Carpet	(Germany) Axel Pretzsch	4–6, 6–3, 7–6
Win	4–0	May 1999	Ljubljana, Slovenia	Challenger	Clay	(Romania) Dinu-Mihai Pescariu	7–5, 6–7, 6–4
Loss	4–1	Mar 2000	Magdeburg, Germany	Challenger	Carpet	(Canada) Sébastien Lareau	6–7^{(1–7)}, 3–6
Win	5–1	May 2000	Fergana, Uzbekistan	Challenger	Hard	(Russia) Igor Kunitsyn	4–6, 6–0, 6–4
Win	6–1	Jul 2002	Manchester, United Kingdom	Challenger	Grass	(Slovakia) Karol Beck	6–4, 7–6^{(7–2)}
Win	7–1	Nov 2002	Aachen, Germany	Challenger	Carpet	(Switzerland) Marc Rosset	7–6^{(7–4)}, 6–4
Loss	7–2	Nov 2003	Milan, Italy	Challenger	Carpet	(Netherlands) Dennis Van Scheppingen	7–5, 4–6, 6–7^{(5–7)}
Win	8–2	Jan 2005	Wrexham, United Kingdom	Challenger	Hard	(Switzerland) George Bastl	4–6, 6–4, 6–3
Win	9–2	Mar 2005	Sarajevo, Bosnia & Herzegovina	Challenger	Hard	(Slovakia) Michal Mertiňák	7–6^{(7–1)}, 6–3
Win	10–2	Mar 2006	Korea F2, Andong	Futures	Hard	(Serbia and Montenegro) Aleksandar Vlaški	6–2, 7–5
Win	11–2	Aug 2007	Russia F4, Moscow	Futures	Clay	(Russia) Artem Sitak	7–6^{(7–4)}, 6–1
Win	12–2	Sep 2007	Germany F15, Kempten	Futures	Clay	(Germany) Marcel Zimmermann	6–4, 3–6, 6–2
Win	13–2	Nov 2007	Great Britain F21, Redbridge	Futures	Hard	(Denmark) Frederik Nielsen	6–1, 4–6, 6–4

=== Doubles: 12 (11–1) ===
Legend ATP Challenger (5–0) ITF Futures (6–1)	Finals by surface Hard (6–0) Clay (4–1) Grass (1–0) Carpet (0–0)

Result	W–L	Date	Tournament	Tier	Surface	Partner	Opponents	Score
Win	1–0	Apr 1998	Uzbekistan F2, Andijan	Futures	Hard	(Belarus) Max Mirnyi	(Uzbekistan) Vadim Kutsenko (Uzbekistan) Volodymyr Uzhylovskyi	6–2, 6–4
Win	2–0	Jul 1998	Bristol, United Kingdom	Challenger	Grass	(Belarus) Max Mirnyi	(Australia) Wayne Arthurs (Australia) Ben Ellwood	6–4, 3–6, 7–6
Win	3–0	May 1999	Germany F2, Schwäbisch Hall	Futures	Clay	(Uzbekistan) Oleg Ogorodov	(Brazil) Ricardo Schlachter (Argentina) Andrés Schneiter	6–3, 4–6, 7–6
Win	4–0	Apr 2002	Napoli, Italy	Challenger	Clay	(Romania) Gabriel Trifu	(Argentina) Martín Vassallo Argüello (Argentina) Leonardo Olguín	7–5, 7–6^{(7–5)}
Win	5–0	May 2002	Rome, Italy	Challenger	Clay	(Romania) Gabriel Trifu	(Argentina) Sergio Roitman (Argentina) Andrés Schneiter	6–1, 6–2
Win	6–0	Aug 2004	Segovia, Spain	Challenger	Hard	(Russia) Igor Kunitsyn	(Spain) Daniel Muñoz de la Nava (Spain) Iván Navarro	3–6, 6–3, 6–2
Win	7–0	Jul 2005	Córdoba, Spain	Challenger	Hard	(Ukraine) Sergiy Stakhovsky	(France) Nicolas Mahut (Luxembourg) Gilles Müller	7–5, 5–7, 6–1
Win	8–0	Apr 2007	Russia F1, Moscow	Futures	Hard	(Belarus) Sergey Betov	(Russia) Konstantin Kravchuk (Russia) Evgeny Kirillov	7–6^{(7–5)}, 6–3
Win	9–0	May 2007	Belarus F1, Minsk	Futures	Hard	(Belarus) Sergey Betov	(Croatia) Ivan Cerović (Russia) Artem Sitak	6–4, 5–7, 6–3
Loss	9–1	Sep 2007	Germany F15, Kempten	Futures	Clay	(Argentina) Nicolás Todero	(Jamaica) Dustin Brown (Belgium) Jeroen Masson	4–6, 4–6
Win	10–1	Nov 2007	Great Britain F22, Sunderland	Futures	Hard	(Belarus) Andrei Karatchenia	(United Kingdom) Neil Bamford (Denmark) Martin Killemose	2–6, 6–2, [10–8]
Win	11–1	Jun 2008	Ukraine F1, Cherkassy	Futures	Clay	(Belarus) Aliaksandr Bury	(Italy) Marco Bella (Italy) Marco Simoni	6–1, ret.

== Performance timeline ==
Key
W	F	SF	QF	#R	RR	Q#	DNQ	A	NH

(W) winner; (F) finalist; (SF) semifinalist; (QF) quarterfinalist; (#R) rounds 4, 3, 2, 1; (RR) round-robin stage; (Q#) qualification round; (DNQ) did not qualify; (A) absent; (NH) not held; (SR) strike rate (events won / competed); (W–L) win–loss record.

=== Singles ===
Tournament	1998	1999	2000	2001	2002	2003	2004	2005	2006	SR	W–L	Win %
Grand Slam tournaments
Australian Open	A	1R	A	1R	2R	1R	A	A	Q1	0 / 4	1–4	20%
French Open	A	1R	A	1R	Q1	1R	2R	A	A	0 / 4	1–4	20%
Wimbledon	3R	1R	SF	1R	Q1	1R	A	Q2	A	0 / 5	7–5	58%
US Open	Q3	Q1	A	2R	Q3	1R	A	Q1	A	0 / 2	1–2	33%
Win–loss	2–1	0–3	5–1	1–4	1–1	0–4	1–1	0–0	0–0	0 / 15	10–15	40%
Olympic Games
Summer Olympics	NH		2R	Not Held			1R	NH		0 / 2	1–2	33%
ATP Masters Series
Indian Wells	A	A	A	1R	A	A	A	A	A	0 / 1	0–1	0%
Miami	A	A	A	2R	A	1R	A	A	A	0 / 2	0–2	0%
Monte Carlo	A	A	A	1R	A	A	A	A	A	0 / 1	0–1	0%
Hamburg	A	A	A	1R	A	A	A	A	A	0 / 1	0–1	0%
Rome	A	A	A	1R	A	A	A	A	A	0 / 1	0–1	0%
Cincinnati	Q2	A	1R	1R	A	A	A	A	A	0 / 2	0–2	0%
Win–loss	0–0	0–0	0–1	0–6	0–0	0–1	0–0	0–0	0–0	0 / 8	0–8	0%
