= Cyril Saulnier =

French tennis player

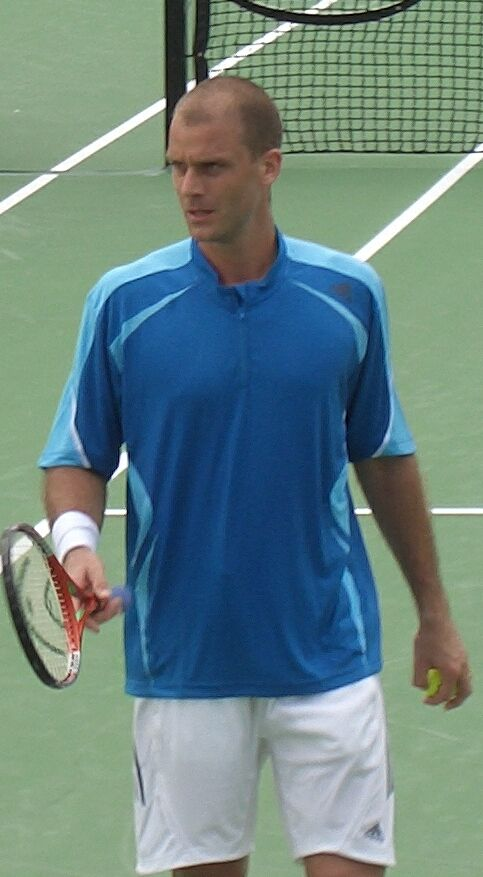
- Saulnier at the 2006 Australian Open
- Country (sports): France
- Residence: Boca Raton, Florida, United States
- Born: 16 August 1975 (age 50); Toulon, France
- Height: 1.83 m (6 ft 0 in)
- Turned pro: 1996
- Retired: 2007
- Plays: Right-handed (one-handed backhand)
- Prize money: $1,391,494

Singles
- Career record: 75–111
- Career titles: 0
- Highest ranking: No. 48 (21 March 2005)

Grand Slam singles results
- Australian Open: 2R (2004)
- French Open: 1R (2000, 2001, 2003, 2004, 2005)
- Wimbledon: 2R (2003, 2004)
- US Open: 2R (2000, 2004, 2005)

Doubles
- Career record: 6–31
- Career titles: 0
- Highest ranking: No. 382 (3 November 2003)

Grand Slam doubles results
- Australian Open: 1R (2005)
- French Open: 2R (2000)
- Wimbledon: 1R (2005)
- US Open: 1R (2004, 2005)
- Last updated on: 27 December 2022.

Cyril Saulnier (French pronunciation: [siʁil sonje]; born 16 August 1975) is a retired French tennis player. In 2005, he started giving tennis lessons in places such as Heliopolis Sporting Club (Egypt). He is now director of the Proworld Tennis Academy in Delray Beach, Florida where he is a full-time coach mentoring up and coming professionals and is currently working on a trial basis with Yulia Putintseva. He is currently married with one daughter and resides in Boca Raton, Florida.

== Tennis career ==
Saulnier reached the third round of the Canada Masters and the Paris Masters in 2004, defeating World No. 13 Dominik Hrbatý in the latter.

In the 2005 SAP Open in San Jose, he reached the final, enabling him to be ranked inside the Top 50 for the first time in his career, reaching as high as World No. 48 in March 2005.

== ATP career finals ==
=== Singles: 1 (1 runner-up) ===
Legend Grand Slam Tournaments (0–0) ATP World Tour Finals (0–0) ATP Masters Series (0–0) ATP Championship Series (0–0) ATP World Series (0–1)	Finals by surface Hard (0–1) Clay (0–0) Grass (0–0) Carpet (0–0)	Finals by setting Outdoors (0–0) Indoors (0–1)

Result	W–L	Date	Tournament	Tier	Surface	Opponent	Score
Loss	0–1	Feb 2005	San Jose, United States	International Series	Hard	(United States) Andy Roddick	0–6, 4–6

== ATP Challenger and ITF Futures finals ==
=== Singles: 7 (4–3) ===
Legend ATP Challenger (3–1) ITF Futures (1–2)	Finals by surface Hard (3–1) Clay (1–1) Grass (0–0) Carpet (0–1)

Result	W–L	Date	Tournament	Tier	Surface	Opponent	Score
Loss	0–1	Aug 1998	France F4, Toulon	Futures	Clay	(Spain) Ivan Rodrigo-Marin	2–6, 3–6
Win	1–1	Aug 1998	Italy F13, Varese	Futures	Clay	(Spain) Ivan Rodrigo-Marin	6–3, 6–3
Loss	1–2	Jul 1999	Greece F4, Alexandroupolis	Futures	Carpet	(Greece) Konstantinos Economidis	4–6, 6–4, 4–6
Win	2–2	Aug 1999	Segovia, Spain	Challenger	Hard	(Spain) Sergi Bruguera	6–4, 7–5
Loss	2–3	Sep 2001	Istanbul, Turkey	Challenger	Hard	(Russia) Nikolay Davydenko	3–6, 3–6
Win	3–3	Mar 2003	Besançon, France	Challenger	Hard	(Philippines) Eric Taino	7–6^{(10–8)}, 6–4
Win	4–3	Sep 2005	Orléans, France	Challenger	Hard	(France) Nicolas Mahut	6–3, 6–4

=== Doubles: 1 (0–1) ===
Legend ATP Challenger (0–0) ITF Futures (0–1)	Finals by surface Hard (0–0) Clay (0–1) Grass (0–0) Carpet (0–0)

Result	W–L	Date	Tournament	Tier	Surface	Partner	Opponents	Score
Loss	0–1	Jun 1998	Hungary F1, Budapest	Futures	Clay	(France) Antony La Porte	(Hungary) Kornel Bardoczky (Hungary) Miklos Jancso	4–6, 7–5, 4–6

== Performance timeline ==
Key
W	F	SF	QF	#R	RR	Q#	P#	DNQ	A	Z#	PO	G	S	B	NMS	NTI	P	NH

(W) winner; (F) finalist; (SF) semifinalist; (QF) quarterfinalist; (#R) rounds 4, 3, 2, 1; (RR) round-robin stage; (Q#) qualification round; (P#) preliminary round; (DNQ) did not qualify; (A) absent; (Z#) Davis/Fed Cup Zonal Group (with number indication) or (PO) play-off; (G) gold, (S) silver or (B) bronze Olympic/Paralympic medal; (NMS) not a Masters tournament; (NTI) not a Tier I tournament; (P) postponed; (NH) not held; (SR) strike rate (events won / competed); (W–L) win–loss record.

=== Singles ===
Tournament	1999	2000	2001	2002	2003	2004	2005	2006	SR	W–L	Win %
Grand Slam tournaments
Australian Open	A	1R	Q3	1R	Q3	2R	1R	1R	0 / 5	1–5	17%
French Open	A	1R	1R	Q1	1R	1R	1R	Q3	0 / 5	0–5	0%
Wimbledon	Q2	1R	Q2	1R	2R	2R	1R	A	0 / 5	2–5	29%
US Open	1R	2R	1R	Q1	1R	2R	2R	Q1	0 / 6	3–6	33%
Win–loss	0–1	1–4	0–2	0–2	1–3	3–4	1–4	0–1	0 / 21	6–21	22%
ATP Tour Masters 1000
Indian Wells	A	1R	Q1	A	A	1R	2R	2R	0 / 4	2–4	33%
Miami	A	2R	Q1	A	2R	2R	1R	1R	0 / 5	3–5	38%
Monte Carlo	A	1R	Q2	A	Q1	Q1	2R	A	0 / 2	1–2	33%
Rome	A	A	A	A	A	A	1R	A	0 / 1	0–1	0%
Hamburg	A	Q2	A	A	A	1R	1R	A	0 / 2	0–2	0%
Canada	A	2R	A	1R	1R	3R	1R	A	0 / 5	3–5	38%
Cincinnati	A	Q1	A	1R	A	A	1R	A	0 / 2	0–2	0%
Paris	A	Q1	A	A	Q1	3R	Q1	Q1	0 / 1	2–1	67%
Win–loss	0–0	2–4	0–0	0–2	1–2	5–5	2–7	1–2	0 / 22	11–22	33%
