= Mardy Fish =

American tennis player (born 1981)

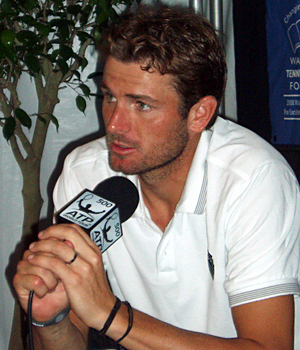
- Fish at a press conference, August 3, 2010
- Full name: Mardy Simpson Fish
- Country (sports): United States
- Residence: Los Angeles, California, U.S.
- Born: December 9, 1981 (age 44) Edina, Minnesota, U.S.
- Height: 1.88 m (6 ft 2 in)
- Turned pro: 2000
- Retired: 2015
- Plays: Right-handed (two-handed backhand)
- Prize money: US$7,392,041

Singles
- Career record: 302–219 (58.0%)
- Career titles: 6
- Highest ranking: No. 7 (August 15, 2011)

Grand Slam singles results
- Australian Open: QF (2007)
- French Open: 3R (2011)
- Wimbledon: QF (2011)
- US Open: QF (2008)

Other tournaments
- Tour Finals: RR (2011)
- Olympic Games: F (2004)

Doubles
- Career record: 136–105 (56%)
- Career titles: 8
- Highest ranking: No. 14 (July 6, 2009)

Grand Slam doubles results
- Australian Open: QF (2005, 2009)
- French Open: 2R (2002, 2010)
- Wimbledon: SF (2009)
- US Open: 3R (2001, 2010)

Team competitions
- Davis Cup: F (2004)
- Hopman Cup: W (2008)
Medal record
Men's tennis
Representing United States
Olympic Games
Silver medal – second place	2004 Athens	Singles

Mardy Simpson Fish (born December 9, 1981) is an American former professional tennis player. He was a hardcourt specialist. He is one of several American tennis players who rose to prominence in the early 2000s.

Fish won six tournaments on the main ATP Tour and reached the final of four Masters Series events: Cincinnati in 2003 and 2010, Indian Wells in 2008, and Montreal in 2011. His best results at Grand Slam tournaments are reaching the quarterfinals of the 2007 Australian Open, the 2008 US Open, and the 2011 Wimbledon Championships. At the 2004 Summer Olympic Games, Fish won the silver medal in men's singles, losing the final to Nicolás Massú.

In April 2011, Fish overtook compatriot and friend Andy Roddick to become the American No. 1 in the ATP rankings, reaching a career-high singles ranking of world No. 7 in August 2011. He then played in the year-end tournament for the only time in his career. He retired after the 2015 US Open. In January 2019, Fish replaced Jim Courier as captain of the United States Davis Cup team.

== Early life ==
Fish is the son of a tennis teaching professional and a housewife, Tom and Sally Fish. He was born in Edina, Minnesota. In 1984 a Minneapolis TV station ran a profile of Fish, at the age of two, hitting tennis balls from the baseline over the net. In 1986, Fish's family moved to Vero Beach, Florida. He attended Vero Beach High School for tenth grade, then moved to Boca Prep in Boca Raton, Florida, for his junior and senior years of high school. He, Andy Roddick, and Jesse Levine all attended Boca Prep International School. During 1999, he lived with Roddick's family, and the two played on the same tennis and basketball teams.

== Tennis career ==
=== Juniors ===
As a junior, Fish compiled a 58–25 singles win–loss record (32–19 in doubles), reaching as high as No. 14 in the world in 1999 (and No. 19 in doubles).

=== 2000–2005 ===
Fish turned professional in 2000 at the age of 18. He spent his first few years as a pro playing in the Challenger and Futures circuits. He earned his first title on the ATP Tour in 2002 playing doubles in the U.S. Men's Clay Court Championships in Houston, Texas, with Andy Roddick.

Fish's career improved significantly in 2003, when he won his first ATP singles title and reached the biggest final of his career in Cincinnati. His singles victory came near the end of the season, when he defeated Robin Söderling to win the Stockholm Open in Stockholm, Sweden. In addition, he defeated fifth-seeded and former world no. 1 Carlos Moyà at the 2003 Australian Open in the second round, 3–6, 7–6, 6–4, 4–6, 6–2. He finished the year ranked no. 20 in the world.

Fish played well in 2004, reaching the finals at the SAP Open in San Jose, California and in the Gerry Weber Open in Halle, Germany. At the 2004 Summer Olympics, Fish earned a silver medal having defeated Juan Carlos Ferrero and Fernando González to reach the final. He lost the final in five sets to Chilean Nicolás Massú.

In 2005, Fish injured his left wrist. It eventually required two surgeries, and as a result, he played just 17 matches in the year.

=== 2006 ===
Fish was awarded a wildcard in April into the US Men's Claycourt Championships. He won the tournament, defeating eighth seed Juan Mónaco, Rainer Schüttler, Vince Spadea, Tommy Haas, and Jürgen Melzer in the final 3–6, 6–4, 6–3.

At Wimbledon, Fish signaled his return to professional status as he reached the third round, defeating fellow American Robby Ginepri and Dutch player Melle van Gemerden. The night prior to his third-round match, he suffered from food poisoning. He could play only one set before retiring against Georgian Irakli Labadze.

=== 2007 ===
Fish began 2007 by achieving his best finish at a Grand Slam. Fish reached the quarterfinals of the Australian Open, losing to his old roommate and doubles partner, Andy Roddick. Fish made waves on the first day of the tournament by knocking off Ivan Ljubičić, the fourth seed, and had an easy win in the third round when his heavily favoured opponent Wayne Arthurs retired in the opening set. Fish had few problems in his first four matches, but lost in straight sets to Roddick. As a result, he moved up by 17 places in the ATP rankings.

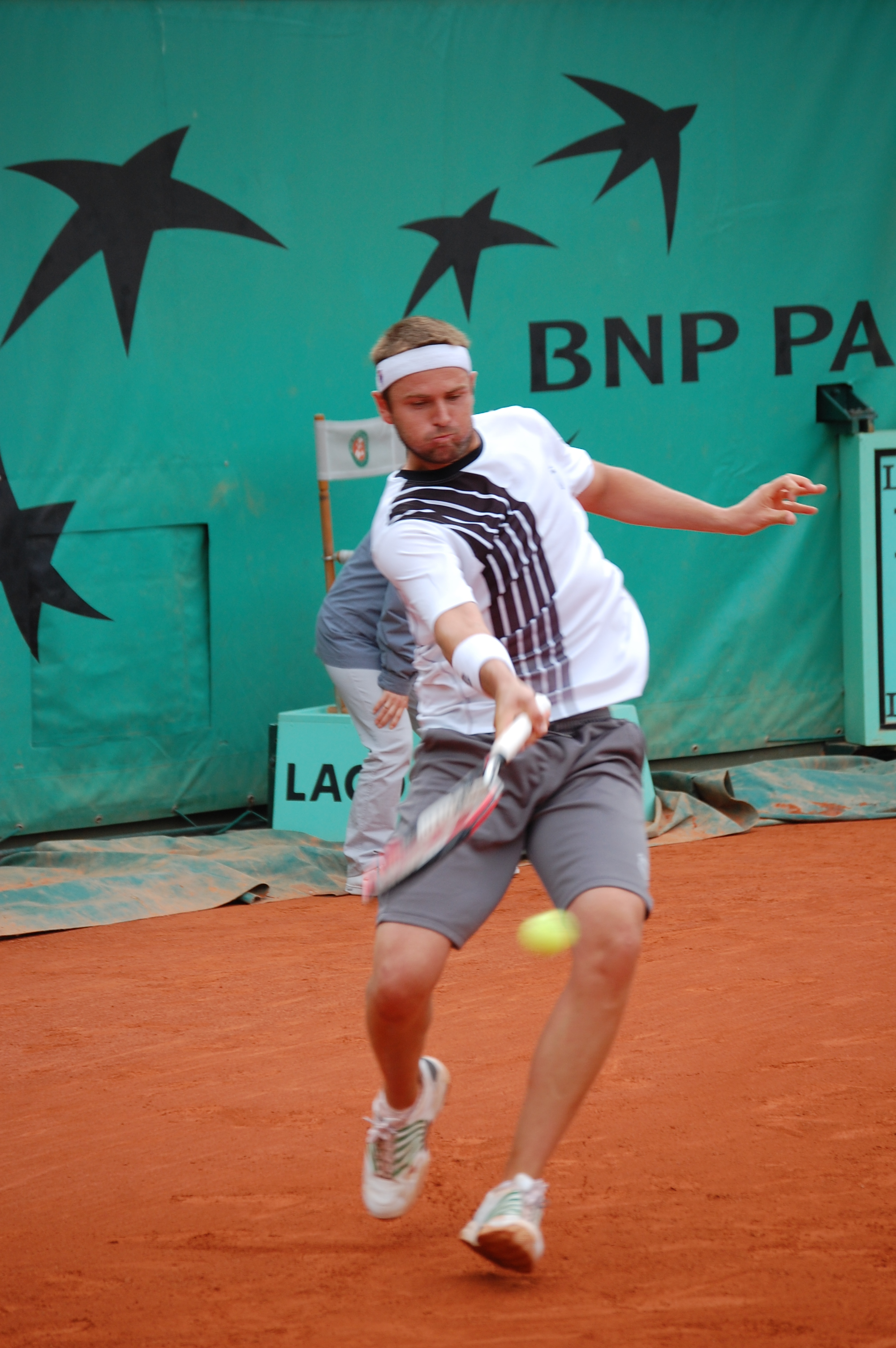
Fish at Roland Garros

=== 2008 ===
Fish started off 2008 quite well at the Hopman Cup, an exhibition event in Perth, Western Australia. Partnering with Serena Williams, he won the title. Williams was ill and arrived after the start of the event, but Meghann Shaughnessy filled in for the first match. Fish won against Indian Rohan Bopanna and Australian Peter Luczak, and received a walkover from Czech Tomáš Berdych. Although Fish lost the first doubles match, he and Williams were undefeated in two mixed doubles matches. They qualified as undefeated for the final, where they faced top-seeded Serbians Novak Djokovic and Jelena Janković. Although Fish lost in singles against Djokovic, the Americans again won the mixed doubles match to win the title.

Fish fell to Jarkko Nieminen in the third round of the Australian Open after a code violation caused him to lose his composure.

Fish then went on to make a quarterfinal showing at the 2008 Delray Beach International Tennis Championships, before losing to long-time friend and wild-card entry Robby Ginepri.

At the Pacific Life Open in Indian Wells, California, Fish defeated world no. 1 Roger Federer in the semifinals in what Fish described as "a great win," after failing to beat the Swiss player in five previous matches. However, Fish lost in the final to Novak Djokovic, the third seed.

At the French Open, Fish lost in the second round to 25th-seeded Lleyton Hewitt with Fish committing 58 unforced errors, compared to Hewitt's twelve.

At Wimbledon, Fish lost in the first round to eighth-seeded Richard Gasquet.

At the US Open, Fish reached the quarterfinals, before losing to Rafael Nadal.

=== 2009 ===
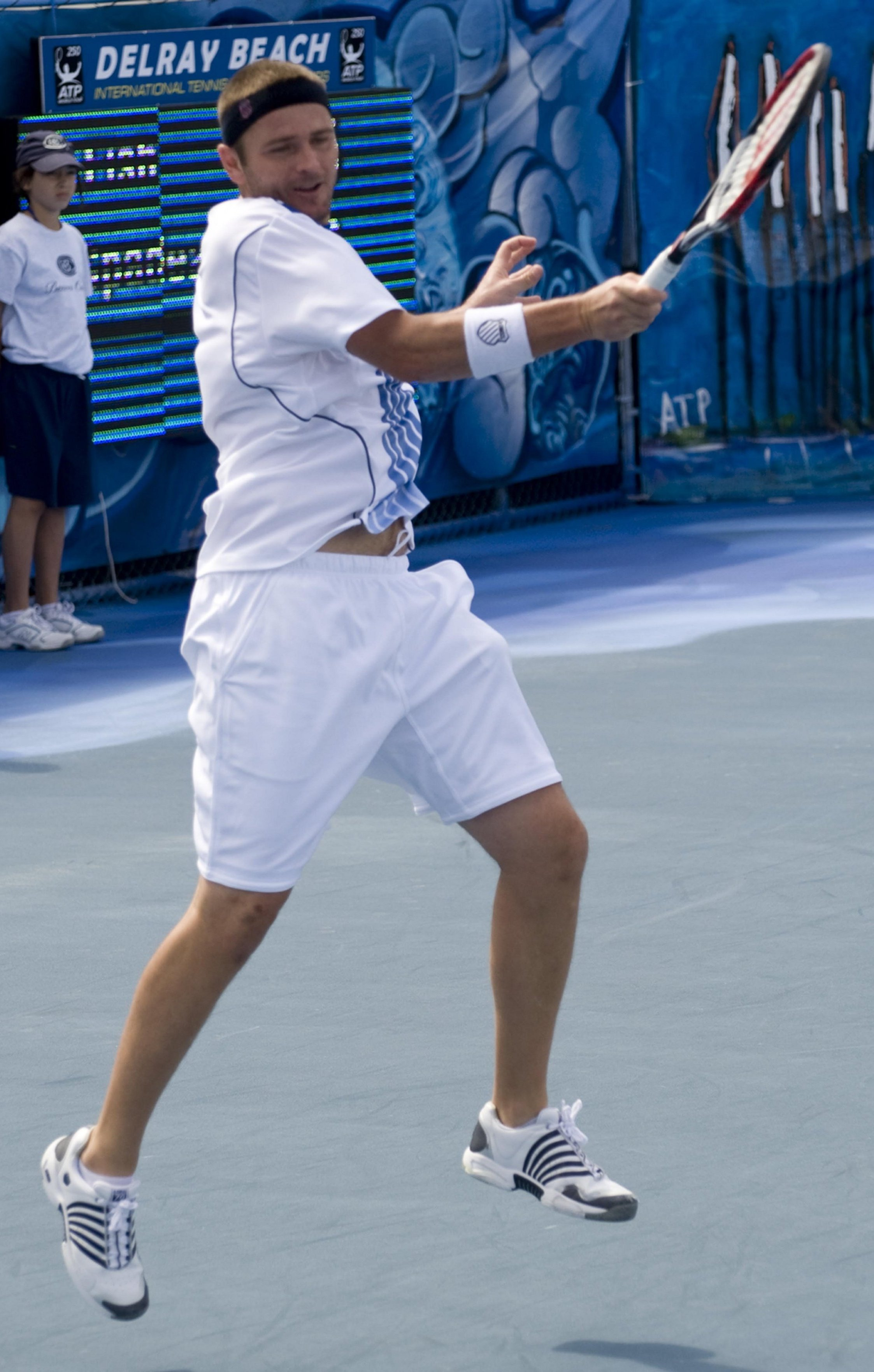
Fish at Delray Beach

Fish won his fifth doubles title, partnering Mark Knowles of the Bahamas at the Regions Morgan Keegan Championships in Memphis. The next week, ranked as the top seed, he won his third singles title at the Delray Beach International Tennis Championships against first-time finalist Evgeny Korolev.

In the 2009 BNP Paribas Open, Fish received a first-round bye, only to be eliminated in the second round by unseeded Frenchman Jérémy Chardy. However, he captured his sixth doubles title and first ATP Masters Series 1000 title with partner Andy Roddick.

In April, Fish played in the 2009 U.S. Men's Clay Court Championships, but was knocked out in the first round by Björn Phau of Germany. He then played in the 2009 Rome Masters, where he lost in the second round to Fernando Verdasco.

Fish advanced to the third round in Wimbledon men's singles, where he fell to Novak Djokovic in straight sets. In doubles, he and partner James Blake advanced to the semifinals, before losing to the defending and eventual champions Daniel Nestor and Nenad Zimonjić.

In July, Fish competed in the Davis Cup against Croatia, losing to Marin Čilić in five sets.

On August 30, Fish withdrew from the 2009 US Open, where he was seeded 25th, citing a rib injury.

=== 2010 ===
Fish began 2010 by winning the SAP Open in San Jose with doubles partner Sam Querrey. The pair defeated Benjamin Becker and Leonardo Mayer, 7–6, 7–5, in the final. With this win, Fish improves to 7–1 lifetime in ATP World Tour doubles finals. On March 27, Fish knocked his second round opponent Andy Murray out of the Sony Ericsson Open in Miami, Florida, in straight sets On June 10, Fish played Andy Murray again in the third round of the Queen's tournament in London. Fish won the first set 6–4, but lost the second 6–1. However, during the third set, Fish was leading 3–0, Murray then brought it back to 3–3. Fish then complained to the umpire that it was too dark, and he then walked off the court without talking to Murray. Murray stayed on the court for a few minutes after the incident and said, "He only complained because I was gaining momentum", and "He wouldn't have complained when he was 3–0 up." The following day, Fish went on to win the third and final set in a 6–4, 1–6, 7–6 victory. He faced Michaël Llodra in the quarterfinals and Feliciano López in the semifinals to reach the final. He lost to compatriot Sam Querrey to finish as runner-up.

At Wimbledon, he lost in the second round to Florian Mayer, 6–7, 6–3, 6–4, 6–4. After Wimbledon, he participated in the last grass-court event of the year, the Hall of Fame Tennis Championships in Newport. He won his fourth title, and first on grass, over Belgian Olivier Rochus in three sets. As a result, his ranking jumped up to the top 50 at 49. He proceeded to win a second straight title, which was also his second of the year and first on hard courts, at the Atlanta Tennis Championships. It was the first tournament in Atlanta in over a decade, and in the semifinal and final rounds, Fish defeated Andy Roddick (whom he had not beaten in eight consecutive career meetings), who was the top seed, and John Isner, who played collegiate tennis for nearby University of Georgia.

In Fish's return to the Western & Southern Financial Group Masters in Cincinnati, he advanced over former world no. 6 Gilles Simon, over world no. 8 Fernando Verdasco, over former world no. 7 Richard Gasquet, and over world no. 4 Murray to reach the semifinals, where he defeated former world no. 1 Andy Roddick, 4–6, 7–6, 6–1. He was edged by world no. 2 Roger Federer, 6–7, 7–6, 6–4, in the final, but jumped into the top 25 in the world rankings.

=== 2011 ===
Fish opened his season at the 2011 Brisbane International, falling in the second round to Stepanek, 3–6, 1–6. Fish then fell in the second round to Tommy Robredo, 6–1, 3–6, 3–6, 3–6, at the 2011 Australian Open.

He made the semifinals at his next two tournaments; 2011 Delray Beach International Tennis Championships, losing to resurging, eventual champion Juan Martín del Potro, and at the 2011 Regions Morgan Keegan Championships losing to fast-rising Canadian youngster Milos Raonic in three sets.

After a first-round bye in the 2011 BNP Paribas Open, he fell in the second round again to Milos Raonic, 5–7, 4–6. At the 2011 Sony Ericsson Open, Fish found some rich vein of form, collecting wins over Julien Benneteau, Richard Gasquet, and notably reached the quarterfinals by winning against Juan Martín del Potro, 7–5, 7–6, who only a few weeks earlier had defeated Fish in Delray Beach. By defeating del Potro and reaching the quarterfinals in Miami, Mardy Fish overtook Andy Roddick as the highest-ranked American player on the tour. Fish's campaign continued, as he upset ATP world no. 6 David Ferrer, 7–5, 6–2, before falling to world no. 2 Novak Djokovic in the semifinals of the Sony Ericsson Open. He entered the top 10 for the first time on April 18, despite not playing, because Fernando Verdasco did not defend his Monte Carlo points.

Fish reached the third round of the 2011 French Open, his best result at the tournament so far. He was beaten by Gilles Simon, 3–6, 4–6, 2–6.

Fish reached the quarterfinals at Wimbledon for the first time, after beating the 2010 finalist Tomáš Berdych in straight sets. He lost to world no. 1 Rafael Nadal, 6–3, 6–3, 5–7, 6–4. At the 2011 Farmers Classic on July 31, 2011, Fish faced Ernests Gulbis for the title, having defeated fellow American teenager Ryan Harrison in the semifinals. He finished runner-up to Gulbis, 7–5, 4–6, 4–6. This dropped him to a 6–13 mark in ATP World Tour finals. The following week, he withdrew from Washington, D.C., citing a heel injury sustained during the Farmers Classic final.

In August at the 2011 Rogers Cup, Fish reached his fourth Masters series final, defeating Feliciano López, Ernests Gulbis, Stanislas Wawrinka, and Janko Tipsarević, 6–3, 6–4, in the semifinal. In the final, Fish faced world no. 1 Novak Djokovic, who was looking to extend his season record to 53–1. He lost to Djokovic, 2–6, 6–3, 4–6, in the final, saving three match points to come up from 0–40 in the final game. Fish rose to a career-high ranking of no. 7.

Fish continued his impressive run on the American hard courts with a comfortable 6–0, 6–2 victory in the second round of the 2011 Western & Southern Open against former world no. four Nikolay Davydenko. In the quarterfinal, he defeated Rafael Nadal, 6–3, 6–4. This was Fish's first win against Nadal. He faced world no. 4 Andy Murray in the semifinal. Fish lost, 3–6, 6–7, after a thrilling second-set tiebreak. In the 2011 US Open, he advanced to the fourth round by beating German Tobias Kamke and qualifier Malek Jaziri in straight sets in the first two rounds, and South African Kevin Anderson in straight sets with two tiebreakers in the third round. Fish was subsequently eliminated in the fourth round of the tournament by world no. 11 Jo-Wilfried Tsonga.

He reached the semifinals in Tokyo in October, defeating Ryan Harrison, Ernests Gulbis, and Bernard Tomic, before falling to Rafael Nadal.

He played for the first time in the Barclays ATP World Tour Finals, but was eliminated in the round-robin stage.

=== 2012 ===
Fish went down in the second round of the 2012 Australian Open to Colombian Alejandro Falla. He made it to the third round of Indian Wells, before being defeated by Australian Matthew Ebden.

He reached the quarterfinals in Miami, but was defeated by Juan Mónaco, 1–6, 3–6. Citing fatigue, he did not play any of the European clay-court season and withdrew from the 2012 French Open. What he did not tell the media until later is that immediately after his last match in Miami, he was taken to the hospital with severe cardiac arrhythmia. On May 23, he underwent a cardiac catheter ablation in Los Angeles to correct faulty electrical connections in his heart, in which those spots were cauterized in order to prevent short circuiting. He later stated that his condition had made it hard for him to sleep, and his heart felt like it was going to burst out of his chest. His condition was also very difficult mentally and emotionally, with periods when he could not stand to be alone.

Fish's first tournament back was the 2012 Wimbledon Championships, where he was seeded 10th. His run at Wimbledon was cut short when he lost to fifth seed Jo-Wilfried Tsonga in the fourth round in four sets.

Fish did not compete in the 2012 Summer Olympics. He instead played at the Citi Open in Washington, D.C., where he was the top seed and reached the semifinals.

In the 2012 US Open Fish was the 23rd seed. He defeated Go Soeda, Nikolay Davydenko, and Gilles Simon before withdrawing for health reasons before his fourth-round match with top seed Roger Federer. In 2015, Fish revealed that he withdrew due to his struggles with anxiety.

Fish did not play on tour for the rest of the season and announced before the end of the year that he would not play in the Australian Open.

=== 2013–2015 ===
Mardy's first tournament of the 2013 season was Indian Wells in March. He received a bye to the second round and defeated qualifier Bobby Reynolds in three sets. He lost in the third round against Jo-Wilfried Tsonga. Fish did not play an ATP match again until Atlanta in July. In his first tournament back, he lost in the first round to Michael Russell in a hard-fought match. In Washington, D.C. the following week, he won his first match against Matthew Ebden, before being downed by Julien Benneteau. He also played doubles in this event, teaming with Radek Štěpánek and making it to the final, where he again lost to Benneteau, teamed with Nenad Zimonjić. After winning his first-round match in Winston-Salem, he retired in the third set against Jarkko Nieminen, citing heat stroke. The next day, he announced that he would not be playing the US Open.

Fish did not play on Tour during 2014, due to an anxiety disorder. In June 2014 Fish had a cardiac catheter ablation operation to correct misfiring electric pulses in his heart. He made a return to competitive tennis in February 2015 at the Tennis Championship of Dallas, competing with Mark Knowles in the doubles tournament. He also received a protected ranking for the Indian Wells Masters, but lost in the first round to Ryan Harrison.

Fish appeared again on tour in July 2015 in Atlanta, but again lost in the first round of singles. Playing doubles with Andy Roddick, he won his first-round match. He also won his first-round match of doubles in Washington, D.C., partnering Grigor Dimitrov, but they conceded a walkover in the second round. In Cincinnati, Fish won his first singles match since 2013 against Victor Troicki. However, he faced Andy Murray in the second round, and lost in straight sets, with a tiebreak in the second set. He also teamed with Tomáš Berdych in doubles, but they lost their first match. He announced that he would retire after the US Open. At the US Open, he defeated Marco Cecchinato in the first round. He lost in the second round in a valiant five-set battle with 18th seed and eventual quarterfinalist Feliciano López.

== World TeamTennis ==
Fish has played nine seasons with World TeamTennis starting in 2004 when he debuted in the league with the Hartford FoxForce, followed by two seasons with the Houston Wranglers in 2005 and 2006, two seasons with the Sacramento Capitals in 2012 and 2013, a season with the Washington Kastles in 2016, and most recently, three years with the New York Empire in 2017, 2018, and 2019. It was announced that he would join the New York Empire during the 2020 WTT season that began July 12 at The Greenbrier.

== Equipment and playing style ==
Fish endorsed the Wilson BLX Six. One 95 18 by 20 racquet with a hybrid of Wilson Natural Gut and Luxilon ALU Power strings. His grip of choice was Wilson Pro Overgrip. He wears TravisMathew apparel.

His biggest weapons were his strong serve and reliable backhand, and he often won points at net with adept volleying. His most reliable shot was his two-handed backhand, which he could flatten out effectively to end points. His forehand was more inconsistent, though it improved toward the end of his career. In 2010, he dropped over 30 pounds, from 203 to 170. This enabled Fish to become much fitter, faster and maintain longer rallies.

== Personal life ==
Fish's father, Tom, is a tennis instructor.

Fish married Stacey Gardner, a California attorney and "Briefcase Model" on NBC's Deal or No Deal, in a Jewish wedding ceremony in September 2008 (Gardner is Jewish). Fish's friend and fellow tennis player James Blake served as groomsman. He is also good friends with Andy Roddick and Bob and Mike Bryan.

Fish went to Vero Beach High School with country music star Jake Owen, with whom he remains good friends. The two have repeatedly done charity events together in Vero Beach to raise money for their favorite charities.

Fish is a fan of the Minnesota Twins and Minnesota Vikings.

Fish had a group of fans called "The Fishheads" who traveled with him and cheered him on during matches:

The setting was center court at Arthur Ashe Stadium yesterday, and the crowd filled only half the seats as Mardy Fish took the court for the second match of the day. But as Fish methodically made his way through a straight-set victory, an odd, and somewhat comical, sight emerged in the otherwise sedate setting.

Perched high in the cheap seats, relatively speaking, were a raucous band of shirtless fans, each one with a letter that collectively spelled out, Go Fish. Their heads were adorned with rubber fish heads and there were fins attached to their hands that they slapped together enthusiastically for each point scored by Fish.

Fish is regarded as one of the best celebrity golfers. He is annually among the favorites at the American Century Championship in Lake Tahoe, winning the tournament in 2020, 2024, and 2026. He won the Diamond Resorts Invitational in Orlando in both 2016 and 2018. In 2022, Fish received a sponsor exemption to play in the 3M Open, a PGA Tour event in his home state of Minnesota. In 2023 at the American Century Championship, Fish finished second to star basketball player Stephen Curry. On the final hole, a fan heckled Fish while hitting his tee shot, who apparently had money on Curry to win the tournament.

As part of the 2021 Netflix docuseries Untold: Breaking Point, Fish shared his story about struggling with anxiety and depression.

== Significant finals ==
=== Olympic Games ===
==== Singles: 1 (1 silver medal) ====
Result	Year	Championship	Surface	Opponent	Score
Silver	2004	Summer Olympics	Hard	(Chile) Nicolás Massú	3–6, 6–3, 6–2, 3–6, 4–6

=== Masters 1000 finals ===
==== Singles: 4 (0–4) ====
Result	Year	Championship	Surface	Opponent	Score
Loss	2003	Cincinnati Masters	Hard	(United States) Andy Roddick	6–4, 6–7^{(3–7)}, 6–7^{(4–7)}
Loss	2008	Indian Wells Masters	Hard	(Serbia) Novak Djokovic	2–6, 7–5, 3–6
Loss	2010	Cincinnati Masters	Hard	(Switzerland) Roger Federer	7–6^{(7–5)}, 6–7^{(1–7)}, 4–6
Loss	2011	Canadian Open	Hard	(Serbia) Novak Djokovic	2–6, 6–3, 4–6

==== Doubles: 2 (1–1) ====
Result	Year	Championship	Surface	Partner	Opponents	Score
Win	2009	Indian Wells Masters	Hard	(United States) Andy Roddick	(Belarus) Max Mirnyi (Israel) Andy Ram	3–6, 6–1, [14–12]
Loss	2011	Italian Open	Clay	(United States) Andy Roddick	(United States) John Isner (United States) Sam Querrey	walkover

== ATP career finals ==
=== Singles: 20 (6 titles, 14 runner-ups) ===
Legend Grand Slam tournaments (0–0) ATP World Tour Finals (0–0) ATP World Tour Masters 1000 (0–4) Olympic Games (0–1) ATP World Tour 500 Series (0–0) ATP World Tour 250 Series (6–9)	Titles by surface Hard (4–11) Clay (1–0) Grass (1–3) Carpet (0–0)	Titles by setting Outdoor (5–12) Indoor (1–2)

Result	W–L	Date	Tournament	Tier	Surface	Opponent	Score
Loss	0–1	Mar 2003	Delray Beach Open, US	International	Hard	(United States) Jan-Michael Gambill	0–6, 6–7^{(5–7)}
Loss	0–2	Jun 2003	Nottingham Open, UK	International	Grass	(United Kingdom) Greg Rusedski	3–6, 2–6
Loss	0–3	Aug 2003	Cincinnati Masters, US	Masters	Hard	(United States) Andy Roddick	6–4, 6–7^{(3–7)}, 6–7^{(4–7)}
Win	1–3	Oct 2003	Stockholm Open, Sweden	International	Hard (i)	(Sweden) Robin Söderling	7–5, 3–6, 7–6^{(7–4)}
Loss	1–4	Feb 2004	Pacific Coast Championships, US	International	Hard (i)	(United States) Andy Roddick	6–7^{(13–15)}, 4–6
Loss	1–5	Jun 2004	Halle Open, Germany	International	Grass	(Switzerland) Roger Federer	0–6, 3–6
Loss	1–6	Aug 2004	Olympic Games, Greece	Olympics	Hard	(Chile) Nicolás Massú	3–6, 6–3, 6–2, 3–6, 4–6
Win	2–6	Apr 2006	U.S. Men's Clay Court Championships, US	International	Clay	(Austria) Jürgen Melzer	3–6, 6–4, 6–3
Loss	2–7	Aug 2007	Connecticut Open, US	International	Hard	(United States) James Blake	5–7, 4–6
Loss	2–8	Mar 2008	Indian Wells Masters, US	Masters	Hard	(Serbia) Novak Djokovic	2–6, 7–5, 3–6
Loss	2–9	Aug 2008	Connecticut Open, US	International	Hard	(Croatia) Marin Čilić	4–6, 6–4, 2–6
Loss	2–10	Feb 2009	Pacific Coast Championships, US	250 Series	Hard (i)	(Czech Republic) Radek Štěpánek	6–3, 4–6, 2–6
Win	3–10	Mar 2009	Delray Beach Open, US	250 Series	Hard	(Russia) Evgeny Korolev	7–5, 6–3
Loss	3–11	Jun 2010	Queen's Club Championships, UK	250 Series	Grass	(United States) Sam Querrey	6–7^{(3–7)}, 5–7
Win	4–11	Jul 2010	Hall of Fame Tennis Championships, US	250 Series	Grass	(Belgium) Olivier Rochus	5–7, 6–3, 6–4
Win	5–11	Jul 2010	Atlanta Open, US	250 Series	Hard	(United States) John Isner	4–6, 6–4, 7–6^{(7–4)}
Loss	5–12	Aug 2010	Cincinnati Masters, US	Masters 1000	Hard	(Switzerland) Roger Federer	7–6^{(7–5)}, 6–7^{(1–7)}, 4–6
Win	6–12	Jul 2011	Atlanta Open, US (2)	250 Series	Hard	(United States) John Isner	3–6, 7–6^{(8–6)}, 6–2
Loss	6–13	Jul 2011	Los Angeles Open, US	250 Series	Hard	(Latvia) Ernests Gulbis	7–5, 4–6, 4–6
Loss	6–14	Aug 2011	Canadian Open, Canada	Masters 1000	Hard	(Serbia) Novak Djokovic	2–6, 6–3, 4–6

=== Doubles: 11 (8 titles, 3 runner-ups) ===
Legend Grand Slam tournaments (0–0) ATP World Tour Finals (0–0) ATP World Tour Masters 1000 (1–1) ATP World Tour 500 Series (2–2) ATP World Tour 250 Series (5–0)	Titles by surface Hard (5–2) Clay (2–1) Grass (1–0)	Titles by setting Outdoor (5–2) Indoor (3–1)

Result	W–L	Date	Tournament	Tier	Surface	Partner	Opponents	Score
Win	1–0	Apr 2002	U.S. Men's Clay Court Championships, US	International	Clay	(United States) Andy Roddick	(United States) Jan-Michael Gambill (United States) Graydon Oliver	6–4, 6–4
Win	2–0	Feb 2004	Pacific Coast Championships, US	International	Hard (i)	(United States) James Blake	(United States) Rick Leach (United States) Brian MacPhie	6–2, 7–5
Win	3–0	Apr 2004	U.S. Men's Clay Court Championships, US (2)	International	Clay	(United States) James Blake	(United States) Rick Leach (United States) Brian MacPhie	6–3, 6–4
Loss	3–1	Feb 2006	U.S. National Indoor Tennis Championships, US	Intl. Gold	Hard (i)	(United States) James Blake	(South Africa) Chris Haggard (Croatia) Ivo Karlović	6–0, 5–7, [5–10]
Win	4–1	Jul 2008	Hall of Fame Tennis Championships, US	International	Grass	(United States) John Isner	(India) Rohan Bopanna (Pakistan) Aisam-ul-Haq Qureshi	6–4, 7–6^{(7–1)}
Win	5–1	Feb 2009	U.S. National Indoor Tennis Championships, US	500 Series	Hard (i)	(The Bahamas) Mark Knowles	(United States) Travis Parrott (Slovakia) Filip Polášek	7–6^{(9–7)}, 6–1
Win	6–1	Mar 2009	Indian Wells Masters, US	Masters 1000	Hard	(United States) Andy Roddick	(Belarus) Max Mirnyi (Israel) Andy Ram	3–6, 6–1, [14–12]
Win	7–1	Feb 2010	Pacific Coast Championships, US (2)	250 Series	Hard (i)	(United States) Sam Querrey	(Germany) Benjamin Becker (Argentina) Leonardo Mayer	7–6^{(7–3)}, 7–5
Win	8–1	Aug 2010	Washington Open, US	500 Series	Hard	(The Bahamas) Mark Knowles	(Czech Republic) Tomáš Berdych (Czech Republic) Radek Štěpánek	4–6, 7–6^{(9–7)}, [10–7]
Loss	8–2	May 2011	Italian Open, Italy	Masters 1000	Clay	(United States) Andy Roddick	(United States) John Isner (United States) Sam Querrey	Walkover
Loss	8–3	Aug 2013	Washington Open, US	500 Series	Hard	(Czech Republic) Radek Štěpánek	(France) Julien Benneteau (Serbia) Nenad Zimonjić	6–7^{(5–7)}, 5–7

== Performance timeline ==
Key
W	F	SF	QF	#R	RR	Q#	P#	DNQ	A	Z#	PO	G	S	B	NMS	NTI	P	NH

(W) winner; (F) finalist; (SF) semifinalist; (QF) quarterfinalist; (#R) rounds 4, 3, 2, 1; (RR) round-robin stage; (Q#) qualification round; (P#) preliminary round; (DNQ) did not qualify; (A) absent; (Z#) Davis/Fed Cup Zonal Group (with number indication) or (PO) play-off; (G) gold, (S) silver or (B) bronze Olympic/Paralympic medal; (NMS) not a Masters tournament; (NTI) not a Tier I tournament; (P) postponed; (NH) not held; (SR) strike rate (events won / competed); (W–L) win–loss record.

=== Singles ===
Tournament	2000	2001	2002	2003	2004	2005	2006	2007	2008	2009	2010	2011	2012	2013	2014	2015	SR	W–L
Grand Slam tournaments
Australian Open	A	A	2R	3R	1R	2R	A	QF	3R	3R	1R	2R	2R	A	A	A	0 / 10	14–10
French Open	A	Q1	Q1	1R	A	1R	A	A	2R	1R	2R	3R	A	A	A	A	0 / 6	4–6
Wimbledon	A	1R	Q1	3R	2R	A	3R	1R	1R	3R	2R	QF	4R	A	A	A	0 / 10	15–10
US Open	1R	1R	2R	2R	2R	1R	2R	2R	QF	A	4R	4R	4R*	A	A	2R	0 / 12	19–12
Win–loss	0–1	0–2	2–2	5–4	2–3	1–3	3–2	5–3	7–4	4–3	5–4	10–4	7–2	0–0	0–0	1–1	0 / 38	52–38
ATP World Tour Finals
Tour Finals	Did not qualify											RR	DNQ				0 / 1	0–3
Olympic Games
Summer Olympics	A	Not Held			F-S	Not Held			A	Not Held			A	Not Held			0 / 1	5–1
ATP World Tour Masters 1000
Indian Wells Masters	A	2R	1R	A	4R	2R	3R	2R	F	2R	2R	2R	3R	3R	A	1R	0 / 13	15–13
Miami Masters	2R	A	2R	3R	2R	2R	2R	A	1R	2R	4R	SF	QF	A	A	A	0 / 11	16–11
Monte Carlo Masters	A	A	A	1R	A	A	A	A	A	A	A	A	A	A	A	A	0 / 1	0–1
Rome Masters	A	A	A	2R	A	A	A	1R	2R	2R	A	3R	A	A	A	A	0 / 5	5–5
Hamburg Masters	A	A	A	1R	A	A	A	1R	1R	Not Masters Series							0 / 3	0–3
Madrid Masters	A	A	A	3R	2R	A	2R	1R	2R	2R	2R	1R	A	A	A	A	0 / 8	7–8
Canada Masters	A	A	A	1R	A	A	A	A	1R	A	A	F	QF	A	A	A	0 / 4	6–4
Cincinnati Masters	1R	Q2	Q1	F	1R	A	2R	1R	1R	A	F	SF	QF	1R	A	2R	0 / 11	18–11
Shanghai Masters	Not Masters Series									A	A	2R	A	A	A	A	0 / 1	0–1
Paris Masters	A	A	A	1R	2R	A	Q1	2R	A	A	A	3R	A	A	A	A	0 / 4	3–4
Win–loss	1–2	1–1	1–2	10–8	4–5	2–2	5–4	1–6	8–7	2–4	10–4	14–8	9–4	1–2	0–0	1–2	0 / 61	70–61
Career statistics
Titles	0	0	0	1	0	0	1	0	0	1	2	1	0	0	0	0	6	
Finals	0	0	0	4	3	0	1	1	2	2	4	3	0	0	0	0	20	
Year-end ranking	305	141	84	20	37	225	47	39	24	55	16	8	27	373	NR	423	$7,392,041	

*Fish withdrew from the 2012 US Open prior to his fourth-round match (not counted as a loss)

=== Doubles ===
Current through the 2012 ATP World Tour Finals.

Tournament	2001	2002	2003	2004	2005	2006	2007	2008	2009	2010	SR	W–L
Grand Slam tournaments
Australian Open		1R	1R		QF		2R		QF		0 / 5	7–5
French Open		2R								2R	0 / 2	2–2
Wimbledon	1R								SF	1R	0 / 3	4–3
US Open	3R	2R	1R			2R				3R	0 / 5	6–5
Win–loss	2–2	2–3	0–2	0–0	3–1	1–1	1–1	0–0	7–2	3–3	0 / 15	19–15

== Wins over top-10 players ==
Season	2000	2001	2002	2003	2004	2005	2006	2007	2008	2009	2010	2011	2012	2013	2015	Total
Wins	0	1	0	4	3	0	0	2	4	1	5	3	1	0	0	24

#	Player	Rank	Event	Surface	Rd	Score
2001
1.	(Sweden) Thomas Enqvist	9	Scottsdale, United States	Hard	2R	6–2, 5–7, 6–4
2003
2.	(Spain) Carlos Moyá	5	Sydney, Australia	Hard	2R	7–6^{(7–4)}, 4–6, 6–4
3.	(Spain) Carlos Moyá	5	Australian Open, Melbourne, Australia	Hard	2R	3–6, 7–6^{(10–8)}, 6–4, 4–6, 6–2
4.	(United States) Andy Roddick	6	Delray Beach, United States	Hard	1R	7–6^{(7–4)}, 4–3, ret.
5.	(Germany) Rainer Schüttler	8	Cincinnati, United States	Hard	SF	7–6^{(7–4)}, 7–6^{(8–6)}
2004
6.	(United States) Andre Agassi	5	San Jose, United States	Hard (i)	SF	5–7, 6–4, 6–2
7.	(Germany) Rainer Schüttler	8	Halle, Germany	Grass	SF	6–4, 4–6, 7–6^{(7–4)}
8.	(Spain) Juan Carlos Ferrero	7	Summer Olympics, Athens, Greece	Hard	2R	4–6, 7–6^{(7–5)}, 6–4
2007
9.	(Croatia) Mario Ančić	9	Auckland, New Zealand	Hard	2R	6–4, 6–4
10.	(Croatia) Ivan Ljubičić	4	Australian Open, Melbourne, Australia	Hard	1R	4–6, 7–6^{(7–2)}, 6–4, 6–4
2008
11.	(Russia) Nikolay Davydenko	4	Indian Wells, United States	Hard	3R	6–3, 6–2
12.	(Argentina) David Nalbandian	7	Indian Wells, United States	Hard	QF	6–3, 6–7^{(5–7)}, 7–6^{(7–4)}
13.	(Switzerland) Roger Federer	1	Indian Wells, United States	Hard	SF	6–3, 6–2
14.	(United States) James Blake	9	US Open, New York, United States	Hard	3R	6–3, 6–3, 7–6^{(7–4)}
2009
15.	(Argentina) Juan Martín del Potro	7	San Jose, United States	Hard (i)	QF	6–3, 6–4
2010
16.	(United Kingdom) Andy Murray	3	Miami, United States	Hard	2R	6–4, 6–4
17.	(United Kingdom) Andy Murray	4	Queen's Club, London, United Kingdom	Grass	3R	6–4, 1–6, 7–6^{(7–2)}
18.	(United States) Andy Roddick	9	Atlanta, United States	Hard	SF	7–6^{(7–5)}, 6–3
19.	(Spain) Fernando Verdasco	8	Cincinnati, United States	Hard	2R	7–6^{(7–1)}, 7–6^{(7–4)}
20.	(United Kingdom) Andy Murray	4	Cincinnati, United States	Hard	QF	6–7^{(7–9)}, 6–1, 7–6^{(7–5)}
2011
21.	(Spain) David Ferrer	6	Miami, United States	Hard	QF	7–5, 6–2
22.	(Czech Republic) Tomáš Berdych	7	Wimbledon, London, United Kingdom	Grass	4R	7–6^{(7–5)}, 6–4, 6–4
23.	(Spain) Rafael Nadal	2	Cincinnati, United States	Hard	QF	6–3, 6–4
2012
24.	(Argentina) Juan Mónaco	10	Toronto, Canada	Hard	3R	2–6, 6–1, 6–4

Sporting positions
Preceded by (United Kingdom) Andy Murray	US Open Series Champion; 2011	Succeeded by (Serbia) Novak Djokovic
