= 2002 in tennis =

This page covers all the important events in the sport of tennis in 2002. Primarily, it provides the results of notable tournaments throughout the year on both the ATP and WTA Tours, the Davis Cup, and the Fed Cup.

Serena Williams triumphed in three top tennis contests in 2002: Wimbledon, the US Open, and the French Open. Other champions that year included Lleyton Hewitt at Wimbledon and in the Tennis Masters Cup; Pete Sampras in the US Open; Jennifer Capriati and Thomas Johansson in the Australian Open; Albert Costa in the French Open; and Kim Clijsters in the WTA Tour Championships. In international team competitions, the Russian men's team beat France to win the Davis Cup, and the Slovak women's team beat Spain in the Fed Cup.

== ITF ==
=== Grand Slam events ===
Men's singles

| Championship | Champion | Finalist | Score in the final |
|---|---|---|---|
| Australian Open | (Sweden) Thomas Johansson | (Russia) Marat Safin | 3–6, 6–4, 6–4, 7–6^{(7–4)} |
| French Open | (Spain) Albert Costa | (Spain) Juan Carlos Ferrero | 6–1, 6–0, 4–6, 6–3 |
| Wimbledon | (Australia) Lleyton Hewitt | (Argentina) David Nalbandian | 6–1, 6–3, 6–2 |
| US Open | (United States) Pete Sampras | (United States) Andre Agassi | 6–3, 6–4, 5–7, 6–4 |

Women's singles

| Championship | Champion | Finalist | Score in the final |
|---|---|---|---|
| Australian Open | (United States) Jennifer Capriati | (Switzerland) Martina Hingis | 4–6, 7–6^{(9–7)}, 6–2 |
| French Open | (United States) Serena Williams | (United States) Venus Williams | 7–5, 6–3 |
| Wimbledon | (United States) Serena Williams | (United States) Venus Williams | 7–6^{(7–4)}, 6–3 |
| US Open | (United States) Serena Williams | (United States) Venus Williams | 6–4, 6–3 |

Men's doubles

| Championship | Champions | Finalists | Score in the final |
|---|---|---|---|
| Australian Open | (The Bahamas) Mark Knowles (Canada) Daniel Nestor | (France) Michaël Llodra (France) Fabrice Santoro | 7–6(7–4), 6–3 |
| French Open | (Netherlands) Paul Haarhuis (Russia) Yevgeny Kafelnikov | (The Bahamas) Mark Knowles (Canada) Daniel Nestor | 7–5, 6–4 |
| Wimbledon | (Sweden) Jonas Björkman (Australia) Todd Woodbridge | (The Bahamas) Mark Knowles (Canada) Daniel Nestor | 6–1, 6–2, 6–7^{(7–9)}, 7–5 |
| US Open | (India) Mahesh Bhupathi (Belarus) Max Mirnyi | (Czech Republic) Jiří Novák (Czech Republic) Radek Štěpánek | 6–3, 3–6, 6–4 |

Women's doubles

| Championship | Champions | Finalists | Score in the final |
|---|---|---|---|
| Australian Open | (Switzerland) Martina Hingis (Russia) Anna Kournikova | (Slovakia) Daniela Hantuchová (Spain) Arantxa Sánchez | 6–2, 6–7^{(4–7)}, 6–1 |
| French Open | (Spain) Virginia Ruano (Argentina) Paola Suárez | (United States) Lisa Raymond (Australia) Rennae Stubbs | 6–4, 6–2 |
| Wimbledon | (United States) Serena Williams (United States) Venus Williams | (Spain) Virginia Ruano (Argentina) Paola Suárez | 6–2, 7–5 |
| US Open | (Spain) Virginia Ruano (Argentina) Paola Suárez | (Russia) Elena Dementieva (Slovakia) Janette Husárová | 6–2, 6–1 |

Mixed doubles

| Championship | Champions | Finalists | Score in the final |
|---|---|---|---|
| Australian Open | (Slovakia) Daniela Hantuchová (Zimbabwe) Kevin Ullyett | (Argentina) Gastón Etlis (Argentina) Paola Suárez | 6–3, 6–2 |
| French Open | (Zimbabwe) Cara Black (Zimbabwe) Wayne Black | (Russia) Elena Bovina (The Bahamas) Mark Knowles | 6–3, 6–3 |
| Wimbledon | (India) Mahesh Bhupathi (Russia) Elena Likhovtseva | (Slovakia) Daniela Hantuchová (Zimbabwe) Kevin Ullyett | 6–2, 1–6, 6–1 |
| US Open | (United States) Mike Bryan (United States) Lisa Raymond | (United States) Bob Bryan (Slovenia) Katarina Srebotnik | 7–6^{(11–9)}, 7–6^{(7–1)} |

=== Davis Cup ===
World Group Draw

First round 8–10 February
Metz, France (indoor clay)
S | France | 3
Netherlands | 2
Ostrava, Czech Republic (indoor carpet)
Czech Republic | 4
S | Brazil | 1
Zaragoza, Spain (indoor clay)
S | Spain | 3
Morocco | 2
Oklahoma City, USA (indoor hard)
S | United States | 5
Slovakia | 0
Moscow, Russia (indoor clay)
Switzerland | 2
S | Russia | 3
Birmingham, England (indoor carpet)
Great Britain | 2
S | Sweden | 3
Zagreb, Croatia (indoor carpet)
Croatia | 4
S | Germany | 1
Buenos Aires, Argentina (clay)
Argentina | 5
S | Australia | 0

Quarterfinals; 5–7 April
Pau, France (indoor carpet)
S | France | 3
Czech Republic | 1
Houston, USA (grass)
S | Spain | 1
S | United States | 3
Moscow, Russia (indoor clay)
S | Russia | 4
S | Sweden | 1
Buenos Aires, Argentina (clay)
Croatia | 2
Argentina | 3

Semifinals; 20–22 September
Paris, France (clay)
S | France | 3
S | United States | 2
Moscow, Russia (indoor carpet)
S | Russia | 3
Argentina | 2

Final; 29 November-1 December
Paris, France (indoor clay)
S | France | 2
S | Russia | 3

First round losers compete in Qualifying Round ties with Zonal Group I Qualifiers.

Final

France
2
Palais Omnisports de Paris-Bercy, Paris, France
29 November – 1 December
Clay (indoors)

Russia
3

| | | | 1 | 2 | 3 | 4 | 5 |
|---|---|---|---|---|---|---|---|
| 1 | (France) (Russia) | Paul-Henri Mathieu; Marat Safin | 4; 6 | 6; 3 | 1; 6 | 4; 6 |
| 2 | (France) (Russia) | Sébastien Grosjean; Yevgeny Kafelnikov | 7^{7} 6^{4} | 6; 3 | 6; 0 |
| 3 | (France) (Russia) | Nicolas Escudé / Fabrice Santoro; Yevgeny Kafelnikov / Marat Safin | 6; 3 | 3; 6 | 5; 7 | 6; 3 | 6; 4 |
| 4 | (France) (Russia) | Sébastien Grosjean; Marat Safin | 3; 6 | 2; 6 | 6^{12} 7^{14} |
| 5 | (France) (Russia) | Paul-Henri Mathieu; Mikhail Youzhny | 6; 3 | 6; 2 | 3; 6 | 5; 7 | 4; 6 |

=== Fed Cup ===
Final Four

Semifinals; 30–31 October
Austria | 2
S | Spain | 3
S | Slovakia | 3
S | Italy | 1

Final; 2–3 November
S | Spain | 1
S | Slovakia | 3

Final

Spain
1
Palacio de Congresos de Maspalomas, Gran Canaria, Spain
2–3 November
hard (indoors)

Slovakia
3

| | | | 1 | 2 | 3 |
|---|---|---|---|---|---|---|
| 1 | (Spain) (Slovakia) | Conchita Martínez; Janette Husárová | 6; 4 | 7^{8} 6^{6} |
| 2 | (Spain) (Slovakia) | Magüi Serna; Daniela Hantuchová | 2; 6 | 1; 6 |
| 3 | (Spain) (Slovakia) | Conchita Martínez; Daniela Hantuchová | 7^{11} 6^{9} | 5; 7 | 4; 6 |
| 4 | (Spain) (Slovakia) | Arantxa Sánchez Vicario; Janette Husárová | 0; 6 | 2; 6 |
| 5 | (Spain) (Slovakia) | Virginia Ruano Pascual / Magüi Serna; Daniela Hantuchová / Janette Husárová | | | | not played |

=== ITF Tour ===
- Men's circuit
- Women's circuit

== ATP/WTA ==
=== Year-End Championships ===
==== Men's singles ====
| Championship | Champion | Finalist | Score in the final |
|---|---|---|---|
| Shanghai | (Australia) Lleyton Hewitt | (Spain) Juan Carlos Ferrero | 7–5, 7–5, 2–6, 2–6, 6–4 |

==== Women's singles ====
| Championship | Champion | Finalist | Score in the final |
|---|---|---|---|
| Los Angeles | (Belgium) Kim Clijsters | (United States) Serena Williams | 7–5, 6–3 |

==== Women's doubles ====
| Championship | Champions | Finalists | Score in the final |
|---|---|---|---|
| Los Angeles | (Russia) Elena Dementieva (Slovakia) Janette Husárová | (Zimbabwe) Cara Black (Russia) Elena Likhovtseva | 4–6, 6–4, 6–3 |

=== Year-End Top 10 ===
==== Men's singles ====
| # | Player | Points |
|---|---|---|
| 1 | (Australia) Lleyton Hewitt | 4,485 |
| 2 | (United States) Andre Agassi | 3,395 |
| 3 | (Russia) Marat Safin | 2,845 |
| 4 | (Spain) Juan Carlos Ferrero | 2,740 |
| 5 | (Spain) Carlos Moyá | 2,630 |
| 6 | (Switzerland) Roger Federer | 2,590 |
| 7 | (Czech Republic) Jiří Novák | 2,335 |
| 8 | (United Kingdom) Tim Henman | 2,215 |
| 9 | (Spain) Albert Costa | 2,070 |
| 10 | (United States) Andy Roddick | 2,045 |

==== Women's singles ====
| # | Player | Points |
|---|---|---|
| 1 | (United States) Serena Williams | 6,080 |
| 2 | (United States) Venus Williams | 5,140 |
| 3 | (United States) Jennifer Capriati | 3,796 |
| 4 | (Belgium) Kim Clijsters | 3,557 |
| 5 | (Belgium) Justine Henin | 3,218 |
| 6 | (France) Amélie Mauresmo | 3,068 |
| 7 | (United States) Monica Seles | 2,952 |
| 8 | (Slovakia) Daniela Hantuchová | 2,667 |
| 9 | (Australia) Jelena Dokic | 2,506 |
| 10 | (Switzerland) Martina Hingis | 2,348 |

== Tennis Hall of Fame ==
| Class | Inductees | Category |
|---|---|---|
| Class of 2002 | (United States) Pam Shriver | Player |
| Class of 2002 | (Sweden) Mats Wilander | Player |

== Births and deaths ==
Births

- 3 March – Lorenzo Musetti, Italian tennis player
- 6 May – Flavio Cobolli, Italian tennis player
- 8 October – Qinwen Zheng, Chinese tennis player
- 9 October – Ben Shelton, American tennis player
- 13 November – Emma Raducanu, British tennis player

Deaths

- 6 June – Bernard Destremau, French tennis player, 85
- 11 August – Nancy Chaffee, American tennis player, 73
