= Michael Hill (tennis) =

Australian tennis player

Michael Robert Hill
- Country (sports): Australia
- Residence: Sydney, Australia
- Born: 30 June 1974 (age 50); Sydney, Australia
- Height: 1.87 m (6 ft 1 1/2 in)
- Turned pro: 1997
- Retired: 2005
- Plays: Right-handed
- College: University of California, Berkeley
- Prize money: $601,306

Singles
- Career record: 2–5 (Grand Slam, ATP Tour level, and Davis Cup)
- Career titles: 0; 2 Challenger, 1 Futures
- Highest ranking: No. 168 (19 July 1999)

Grand Slam singles results
- Australian Open: 2R (2000)
- French Open: Q2 (2000)
- Wimbledon: Q3 (1997, 1998, 1999)
- US Open: Q2 (1998, 1999)

Doubles
- Career record: 104–100 (Grand Slam, ATP Tour level, and Davis Cup)
- Career titles: 3; 10 Challenger, 1 Futures
- Highest ranking: No. 18 (30 July 2001)

Grand Slam doubles results
- Australian Open: 3R (2001)
- French Open: SF (2001)
- Wimbledon: 3R (2001)
- US Open: 3R (2001)

Grand Slam mixed doubles results
- Australian Open: SF (2002)
- French Open: QF (2002)
- Wimbledon: 2R (2004)
- US Open: 2R (2001)
- Last updated on: 7 July 2021.

Michael Robert Hill (born 30 June 1974) is a former tennis player from Australia who turned professional in 1997 and retired in 2005. He was primarily a doubles specialist, achieving a career-high doubles ranking of World Number 18, reached on 30 July 2001.

== Career ==
=== College ===
Hill played three years at University of California Berkeley from 1994 to 1996 and earned All-American honors in singles in 1995–96; he studied business and economics.

=== Professional career ===
In 1995, Hill played in his first pro match at Aptos Challenger where he lost in the first round. In 1997 he reached his first quarter final, at the Guadalajara Challenger.

In 1998 he achieved some singles success in Futures and Challenger play. He won the Ireland #1 Futures title, where he defeated Noam Okun, and was also a finalist at USTA #1 Futures, where he lost to Ronald Agénor. He also made a Semi-final at USTA #2 Futures. In August, Hill won his first Challenger title in Tijuana (d. Hernandez) without dropping a set. He also reached quarter finals in San Antonio and Las Vegas Challengers. In doubles, won Challenger titles in Denver with Weiner, and Tijuana with Humphries. He also reached three consecutive finals in October in Dallas, San Antonio and San Diego, all with Humphries.

In 1999, Hill captured his second Challenger singles title in Aptos (d. Levy) and reached the quarterfinals of the Surbiton Challenger. Most of his success was in doubles; he won four Challenger titles, with back-to-back titles in Cherbourg and Magdeburg (with Painter) and in the second half of year, won in Aptos (with Humphries) and Hong Kong (with Godwin). In his second career ATP outing in Tokyo, advanced to semi finals with Humphries. In July, he reached the semi-finals in Newport (with Godwin) and made quarterfinals in four other ATP tournaments.

In 2000 he captured his first ATP doubles title in Brighton and also reached final in Tokyo with American Jeff Tarango, whom he'd have more success with the following year. He played in eight singles tournaments with his best result coming at Kyoto Challenger in March when he advanced to semi finals, along with a quarter final's appearance at the Hamilton Challenger. He made his Grand Slam singles debut at Australian Open, where he defeated Bernd Karbacher in straight sets in the first round. In the second round, he lost to Sébastien Grosjean 4–6, 6–1, 7–6(3), 6–0.

2001

He played eight other partners during the year, but mostly played with Tarango. The duo finished No. 9 in ATP Doubles Race with a 30–17 match record, winning their second title together in Casablanca in March as well as reaching finals in Marseille, Gstaad and Stuttgart. Their best Grand Slam together was reaching the semi-finals at Roland Garros after defeating top seeds Jonas Björkman and Todd Woodbridge in the quarter-finals. Finished the year with a career-high $190,217 in yearly earnings and finished the season at a year-end best No. 25 in doubles.

== Personal ==
His father, Robert was the CFO of Abacus Property a publicly listed property development company. He has two siblings: younger brother Patrick and one older sister Carmel.

== ATP Career Finals ==
=== Doubles: 9 (3 titles, 6 runner-ups) ===
Legend (doubles) Grand Slam (0–0) ATP World Tour Finals (0–0) ATP Masters Series (0–0) ATP Championship Series (1–2) ATP International Series (2–4)	Finals by surface Hard (1–2) Clay (2–4) Grass (0–0) Carpet (0–0)	Finals by setting Outdoor (3–5) Indoor (0–1)

Result	W–L	Date	Tournament	Tier	Surface	Partner	Opponents	Score
Loss	0–1	Oct 2000	Tokyo, Japan	Championship Series	Hard	(United States) Jeff Tarango	(India) Mahesh Bhupathi (India) Leander Paes	4–6, 7–6^{(7–1)}, 3–6
Win	1–1	Nov 2000	Brighton, United Kingdom	World Series	Hard	(United States) Jeff Tarango	(United States) Paul Goldstein (United States) Jim Thomas	6–3, 7–5
Loss	1–2	Feb 2001	Marseille, France	World Series	Hard	(United States) Jeff Tarango	(France) Fabrice Santoro (France) Julien Boutter	6–7^{(7–9)}, 5–7
Win	2–2	Apr 2001	Casablanca, Morocco	World Series	Clay	(United States) Jeff Tarango	(Australia) David Macpherson (Argentina) Pablo Albano	7–6^{(7–2)}, 6–3
Loss	2–3	Jul 2001	Gstaad, Switzerland	World Series	Clay	(United States) Jeff Tarango	(Switzerland) Roger Federer (Russia) Marat Safin	1–0 ret.
Loss	2–4	Jul 2001	Stuttgart, Germany	Championship Series	Clay	(United States) Jeff Tarango	(Argentina) Guillermo Cañas (Germany) Rainer Schüttler	6–4, 6–7^{(1–7)}, 4–6
Win	3–4	Apr 2002	Barcelona, Spain	Championship Series	Clay	(Czech Republic) Daniel Vacek	(Argentina) Lucas Arnold Ker (Argentina) Gastón Etlis	6–4, 6–4
Loss	3–5	May 2002	St Pölten, Austria	World Series	Clay	(United States) Mike Bryan	(Czech Republic) Petr Pála (Czech Republic) David Rikl	5–7, 4–6
Loss	3–6	Jul 2002	Båstad, Sweden	World Series	Clay	(Australia) Paul Hanley	(Sweden) Jonas Björkman (Australia) Todd Woodbridge	6–7^{(6–8)}, 4–6

== ATP Challenger and ITF Futures finals ==
=== Singles: 4 (3–1) ===
Legend ATP Challenger (2–0) ITF Futures (1–1)	Finals by surface Hard (2–0) Clay (0–1) Grass (0–0) Carpet (1–0)

Result	W–L	Date	Tournament	Tier	Surface	Opponent	Score
Loss	0–1	May 1998	USA F1, Delray Beach	Futures	Clay	(Haiti) Ronald Agénor	3–6, 3–6
Win	1–1	Jun 1998	Ireland F1, Dublin	Futures	Carpet	(Israel) Noam Okun	4–6, 6–4, 6–3
Win	2–1	Aug 1998	Tijuana, Mexico	Challenger	Hard	(Mexico) Alejandro Hernández	7–5, 6–1
Win	3–1	Jul 1999	Aptos, United States	Challenger	Hard	(Israel) Harel Levy	6–7, 6–4, 6–2

=== Doubles: 15 (11–4) ===
Legend ATP Challenger (10–3) ITF Futures (1–1)	Finals by surface Hard (9–3) Clay (0–1) Grass (0–0) Carpet (2–0)

Result	W–L	Date	Tournament	Tier	Surface	Partner	Opponents	Score
Loss	0–1	May 1998	USA F1, Delray Beach	Futures	Clay	(United States) Scott Humphries	(Sweden) Simon Aspelin (United States) Chris Tontz	4–6, 4–6
Win	1–1	Jun 1998	Ireland F2, Dublin	Futures	Carpet	(United States) Scott Humphries	(South Africa) Jeff Coetzee (South Africa) Damien Roberts	3–6, 6–3, 6–2
Win	2–1	Jul 1998	Denver, United States	Challenger	Hard	(United States) Glenn Weiner	(South Africa) Justin Bower (Australia) Troy Budgen	7–6, 6–4
Win	3–1	Aug 1998	Tijuana, Mexico	Challenger	Hard	(United States) Scott Humphries	(United States) Mitch Sprengelmeyer (United States) Eric Taino	6–3, 6–2
Loss	3–2	Oct 1998	Dallas, United States	Challenger	Hard	(United States) Scott Humphries	(United States) Jared Palmer (United States) Jonathan Stark	3–6, 4–6
Loss	3–3	Oct 1998	San Antonio, United States	Challenger	Hard	(United States) Scott Humphries	(United States) Michael Sell (United States) David Di Lucia	3–6, 1–6
Loss	3–4	Oct 1998	San Diego, United States	Challenger	Hard	(United States) Scott Humphries	(United States) Adam Peterson (United States) Paul Goldstein	2–6, 5–7
Win	4–4	Feb 1999	Cherbourg, France	Challenger	Hard	(Australia) Andrew Painter	(Italy) Massimo Bertolini (Italy) Cristian Brandi	7–5, 7–6
Win	5–4	Mar 1999	Magdeburg, Germany	Challenger	Carpet	(Australia) Andrew Painter	(Germany) Jan-Ralph Brandt (Germany) Dirk Dier	7–6, 6–7, 7–6
Win	6–4	Jul 1999	Aptos, United States	Challenger	Hard	(Australia) Andrew Painter	(Israel) Harel Levy (Israel) Lior Mor	7–6, 1–6, 7–5
Win	7–4	Oct 1999	Hong Kong, Hong Kong	Challenger	Hard	(South Africa) Neville Godwin	(United States) Bob Bryan (United States) Mike Bryan	3–6, 7–5, 7–6
Win	8–4	Feb 2000	Amarillo, United States	Challenger	Hard	(United States) Brian Macphie	(United States) Brandon Coupe (United States) Michael Sell	7–5, 6–2
Win	9–4	Feb 2000	Ho Chi Minh City, Vietnam	Challenger	Hard	(Australia) Todd Woodbridge	(Georgia (country)) Irakli Labadze (South Africa) Kevin Ullyett	6–3, 6–4
Win	10–4	Mar 2000	Singapore, Singapore	Challenger	Hard	(South Africa) Neville Godwin	(Australia) Nathan Healey (Australia) Paul Hanley	6–4, 6–1
Win	11–4	Mar 2000	Hamilton, New Zealand	Challenger	Hard	(South Africa) Neville Godwin	(United States) Michael Joyce (United States) Jim Thomas	7–6^{(7–4)}, 6–4

== Performance timelines ==
Key
W	F	SF	QF	#R	RR	Q#	DNQ	A	NH

(W) winner; (F) finalist; (SF) semifinalist; (QF) quarterfinalist; (#R) rounds 4, 3, 2, 1; (RR) round-robin stage; (Q#) qualification round; (DNQ) did not qualify; (A) absent; (NH) not held; (SR) strike rate (events won / competed); (W–L) win–loss record.

=== Singles ===
Tournament	1996	1997	1998	1999	2000	SR	W–L	Win %
Grand Slam tournaments
Australian Open	Q1	Q2	Q1	Q3	2R	0 / 1	1–1	50%
French Open	A	A	A	Q1	Q2	0 / 0	0–0	–
Wimbledon	A	Q3	Q3	Q3	Q2	0 / 0	0–0	–
US Open	A	Q1	Q2	Q2	A	0 / 0	0–0	–
Win–loss	0–0	0–0	0–0	0–0	1–1	0 / 1	1–1	50%
ATP Tour Masters 1000
Cincinnati Masters	A	A	A	Q1	A	0 / 0	0–0	–
Win–loss	0–0	0–0	0–0	0–0	0–0	0 / 0	0–0	–

=== Doubles ===
Tournament	1999	2000	2001	2002	2003	2004	2005	SR	W–L	Win %
Grand Slam tournaments
Australian Open	A	2R	3R	2R	1R	A	1R	0 / 5	4–5	44%
French Open	A	QF	SF	1R	A	1R	A	0 / 4	6–4	60%
Wimbledon	1R	1R	3R	1R	A	1R	A	0 / 5	2–5	29%
US Open	2R	1R	3R	2R	A	A	A	0 / 4	4–4	50%
Win–loss	1–2	4–4	9–4	2–4	0–1	0–2	0–1	0 / 18	16–18	47%
ATP Tour Masters 1000
Indian Wells	A	A	QF	1R	A	A	A	0 / 2	2–2	50%
Miami Open	Q2	A	3R	1R	A	A	A	0 / 2	1–2	33%
Monte Carlo	A	Q1	1R	1R	A	A	A	0 / 2	1–2	33%
Rome	A	A	1R	2R	A	A	A	0 / 2	1–2	33%
Madrid	Not Held			2R	A	A	A	0 / 1	1–1	50%
Hamburg	A	A	1R	2R	A	A	A	0 / 2	1–2	50%
Canada Masters	A	A	2R	QF	A	A	A	0 / 2	3–2	60%
Cincinnati	Q1	2R	2R	1R	A	A	A	0 / 3	2–3	40%
Stuttgart	A	1R	QF	Not Held				0 / 2	2–2	50%
Paris Masters	A	QF	2R	2R	A	A	A	0 / 3	4–3	57%
Win–loss	0–0	3–3	7–8	8–9	0–0	0–0	0–0	0 / 21	18–21	46%

=== Mixed doubles ===
Tournament	2000	2001	2002	2003	2004	SR	W–L	Win %
Grand Slam tournaments
Australian Open	2R	1R	SF	1R	A	0 / 4	4–4	50%
French Open	2R	A	QF	A	A	0 / 2	3–2	60%
Wimbledon	1R	1R	1R	A	2R	0 / 4	1–4	20%
US Open	A	2R	1R	A	A	0 / 2	1–2	33%
Win–loss	2–3	1–3	5–4	0–1	1–1	0 / 12	9–12	43%
