= Petr Pála =

Czech tennis player and coach

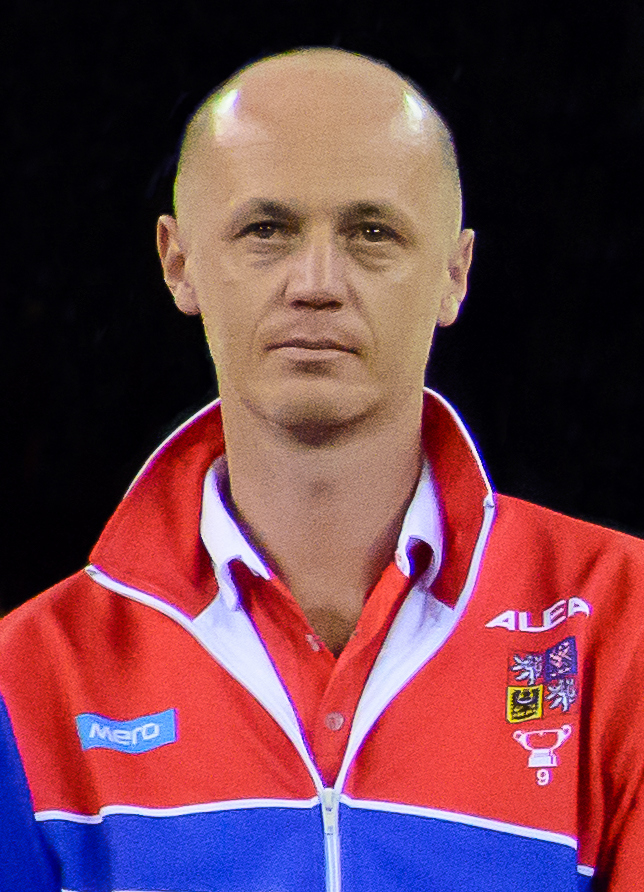
- Petr Pála at the 2016 Fed Cup World Group
- Country (sports): Czech Republic
- Residence: Prague, Czech Republic
- Born: 2 October 1975 (age 51) Prague, Czechoslovakia
- Height: 1.93 m (6 ft 4 in)
- Turned pro: 1993
- Plays: Right-handed (two-handed backhand)
- Prize money: $1,106,011

Singles
- Career record: 0–1
- Career titles: 0; 0 Challenger, 0 Futures
- Highest ranking: 286 (24 June 1996)

Grand Slam singles results
- US Open: Q1 (1996)

Doubles
- Career record: 206–235
- Career titles: 7; 9 Challenger, 1 Futures
- Highest ranking: 10 (6 August 2001)

Grand Slam doubles results
- Australian Open: 3R (2002, 2004)
- French Open: F (2001)
- Wimbledon: QF (2001)
- US Open: 3R (2001)

Grand Slam mixed doubles results
- Australian Open: QF (2002)
- French Open: SF (2001)
- Wimbledon: 2R (2000, 2002, 2003)
- US Open: 1R (2001)

Coaching career (2008–present)
- Czech Republic Fed Cup team

Petr Pála (born 2 October 1975) is a tennis coach and former professional tennis player from the Czech Republic. Together with Pavel Vízner he reached the men's doubles final of the 2001 French Open but lost to Indians Mahesh Bhupathi and Leander Paes (6–7, 3–6).

Pála was coached by his father František, who was a professional tennis player on the ATP tour.

Pála never had the opportunity to do his singles ability justice on the ATP Tour due to injury. When he recovered from these injuries he returned immediately to the doubles tour, but could not gain entry to official ATP matches.

Pála became the non-playing captain of the Czech Republic Fed Cup team in December 2007. Since then, he has led the Fed Cup team to world titles in 2011, 2012, 2014, 2015, 2016 and 2018, becoming the most successful Fed Cup team captain of all time.

== Grand Slam finals ==
=== Doubles: 1 runner-up ===
Result	Year	Championship	Surface	Partner	Opponents	Score
Loss	2001	French Open	Clay	(Czech Republic) Pavel Vízner	(India) Mahesh Bhupathi (India) Leander Paes	6–7, 3–6

== Performance timelines ==
Key
W	F	SF	QF	#R	RR	Q#	DNQ	A	NH

(W) winner; (F) finalist; (SF) semifinalist; (QF) quarterfinalist; (#R) rounds 4, 3, 2, 1; (RR) round-robin stage; (Q#) qualification round; (DNQ) did not qualify; (A) absent; (NH) not held; (SR) strike rate (events won / competed); (W–L) win–loss record.

=== Doubles ===
Tournament	1996	1997	1998	1999	2000	2001	2002	2003	2004	2005	2006	2007	2008	SR	W–L	Win%
Grand Slam tournaments
Australian Open	A	A	A	A	1R	2R	3R	1R	3R	1R	1R	2R	1R	0 / 9	6–9	40%
French Open	A	A	A	A	2R	F	1R	1R	2R	1R	2R	2R	1R	0 / 9	9–9	50%
Wimbledon	3R	A	A	A	2R	QF	1R	1R	1R	1R	2R	3R	3R	0 / 10	11–10	52%
US Open	1R	A	A	1R	1R	3R	2R	2R	1R	1R	1R	2R	A	0 / 10	5–10	33%
Win–loss	2–2	0–0	0–0	0–1	2–4	11–4	3–4	1–4	3–4	0–4	2–4	5–4	2–3	0 / 38	31–38	45%
ATP World Tour Masters 1000
Indian Wells	A	A	A	A	A	2R	1R	1R	2R	1R	A	1R	A	0 / 6	2–6	25%
Miami	A	A	A	A	Q1	2R	2R	1R	1R	1R	A	1R	A	0 / 6	1–6	14%
Monte Carlo	A	A	A	A	A	QF	A	A	2R	A	A	A	A	0 / 2	3–2	60%
Rome	A	A	A	A	A	SF	2R	A	A	A	A	A	A	0 / 2	4–2	67%
Madrid	Not Held						1R	A	A	A	A	A	A	0 / 1	0–1	0%
Canada	A	A	A	A	A	1R	A	A	2R	A	A	A	A	0 / 2	1–2	33%
Cincinnati	A	A	A	A	A	1R	2R	A	1R	A	A	A	A	0 / 3	1–3	25%
Hamburg	Q1	A	A	A	Q1	SF	1R	A	1R	1R	A	A	A	0 / 4	3–4	43%
Paris	A	A	A	A	A	2R	1R	A	A	A	A	A	A	0 / 2	0–2	0%
Stuttgart	A	A	A	A	A	2R	Not Masters Series							0 / 1	0–1	0%
Win–loss	0–0	0–0	0–0	0–0	0–0	10–9	2–7	0–2	3–6	0–3	0–0	0–2	0–0	0 / 29	15–29	34%

=== Mixed doubles ===
Tournament	2000	2001	2002	2003	2004	2005	2006	SR	W–L	Win%
Grand Slam tournaments
Australian Open	A	A	QF	A	A	1R	A	0 / 2	2–2	50%
French Open	A	SF	1R	A	1R	A	A	0 / 3	3–3	50%
Wimbledon	2R	1R	2R	2R	1R	1R	1R	0 / 7	3–7	30%
US Open	A	1R	A	A	A	A	A	0 / 1	0–1	0%
Win–loss	1–1	3–3	3–3	1–1	0–2	0–2	0–1	0 / 13	8–13	38%

== ATP career finals ==
=== Doubles: 17 (7 titles, 10 runner-ups) ===
Legend Grand Slam Tournaments (0–1) Tennis Masters Cup (0–1) ATP Masters Series (0–0) ATP Championship Series (1–2) ATP World Series (6–6)	Finals by surface Hard (2–6) Clay (5–3) Grass (0–1) Carpet (0–0)	Finals by setting Outdoors (6–7) Indoors (1–3)

Result	W–L	Date	Tournament	Tier	Surface	Partner	Opponents	Score
Loss	0–1	Aug 1999	San Marino, San Marino	World Series	Clay	(Czech Republic) Pavel Vízner	(Argentina) Lucas Arnold Ker (Argentina) Mariano Hood	3–6, 2–6
Loss	0–2	Oct 2000	Shanghai, China	World Series	Hard	(Czech Republic) Pavel Vízner	(Netherlands) Paul Haarhuis (Netherlands) Sjeng Schalken	2–6, 6–3, 4–6
Loss	0–3	Nov 2000	Stockholm, Sweden	World Series	Hard	(Czech Republic) Pavel Vízner	(The Bahamas) Mark Knowles (Canada) Daniel Nestor	3–6, 2–6
Loss	0–4	Feb 2001	Rotterdam, Netherlands	Championship Series	Hard	(Czech Republic) Pavel Vízner	(Sweden) Jonas Björkman (Switzerland) Roger Federer	3–6, 0–6
Win	1–4	May 2001	St Pölten, Austria	World Series	Clay	(Czech Republic) David Rikl	(Brazil) Jaime Oncins (Argentina) Daniel Orsanic	6–3, 5–7, 7–5
Loss	1–5	Jun 2001	Paris, France	Grand Slam	Clay	(Czech Republic) Pavel Vízner	(India) Mahesh Bhupathi (India) Leander Paes	6–7^{(5–7)}, 3–6
Loss	1–6	Feb 2002	Bangalore, India	Tennis Masters Cup	Hard	(Czech Republic) Pavel Vízner	(South Africa) Ellis Ferreira (United States) Rick Leach	7–6^{(8–6)}, 6–7^{(2–7)}, 4–6, 4–6
Loss	1–7	May 2002	Munich, Germany	World Series	Clay	(Czech Republic) Pavel Vízner	(Czech Republic) Radek Štěpánek (Czech Republic) Petr Luxa	0–6, 7–6^{(7–4)}, [9–11]
Win	2–6	May 2002	St Pölten, Austria	World Series	Clay	(Czech Republic) David Rikl	(United States) Mike Bryan (Australia) Michael Hill	7–5, 6–4
Loss	2–8	Aug 2002	Long Island, United States	World Series	Hard	(Czech Republic) Pavel Vízner	(India) Mahesh Bhupathi (United States) Mike Bryan	3–6, 4–6
Win	3–7	May 2004	St Pölten, Austria	International Series	Clay	(Argentina) Mariano Hood	(Czech Republic) Tomáš Cibulec (Czech Republic) Leoš Friedl	3–6, 7–5, 6–4
Loss	3–9	Jun 2004	Halle, Germany	International Series	Grass	(Czech Republic) Tomáš Cibulec	(India) Leander Paes (Czech Republic) David Rikl	2–6, 5–7
Loss	3–10	Oct 2004	Tokyo, Japan	Championship Series	Hard	(Czech Republic) Jiří Novák	(United States) Jared Palmer (Czech Republic) Pavel Vízner	1–5 ret.
Win	4–9	Jul 2005	Umag, Croatia	International Series	Clay	(Czech Republic) Jiří Novák	(Czech Republic) David Škoch (Slovakia) Michal Mertiňák	6–3, 6–3
Win	5–9	Jan 2006	Chennai, India	International Series	Hard	(Slovakia) Michal Mertiňák	(India) Prakash Amritraj (India) Rohan Bopanna	6–2, 7–5
Win	6–9	Oct 2006	Vienna, Austria	Championship Series	Hard	(Czech Republic) Pavel Vízner	(Austria) Julian Knowle (Austria) Jürgen Melzer	6–4, 3–6, [12–10]
Win	7–9	Jul 2008	Umag, Croatia	International Series	Clay	(Slovakia) Michal Mertiňák	(Argentina) Carlos Berlocq (Italy) Fabio Fognini	2–6, 6–3, [10–5]

== ATP Challenger and ITF Futures finals ==
=== Doubles: 20 (10–10) ===
Legend ATP Challenger (9–10) ITF Futures (1–0)	Finals by surface Hard (1–2) Clay (5–6) Grass (1–0) Carpet (3–2)

Result	W–L	Date	Tournament	Tier	Surface	Partner	Opponents	Score
Loss	0–1	Jul 1995	Prague, Czech Republic	Challenger	Clay	(Czech Republic) David Škoch	(Belgium) Filip Dewulf (Czech Republic) Vojtěch Flégl	7–6, 5–7, 2–6
Loss	0–2	Jun 1996	Košice, Slovakia	Challenger	Clay	(Czech Republic) Jan Kodeš Jr.	(France) Olivier Delaître (United States) Jeff Tarango	6–7, 3–6
Win	1–2	Jul 1996	Bristol, United Kingdom	Challenger	Grass	(United Kingdom) Andrew Richardson	(France) Lionel Barthez (Germany) Patrick Baur	6–2, 6–4
Loss	1–3	Jul 1997	Ulm, Germany	Challenger	Clay	(Czech Republic) Petr Luxa	(Belgium) Kris Goossens (Belgium) Tom Vanhoudt	3–6, 0–6
Win	2–3	Aug 1997	Plzeň, Czech Republic	Challenger	Clay	(Slovenia) Borut Urh	(Czech Republic) Radek Štěpánek (Czech Republic) Radomír Vašek	2–4 ret.
Win	3–3	Feb 1998	Austria F3, Mondseeland	Futures	Carpet	(Slovenia) Borut Urh	(Bulgaria) Ivaylo Traykov (Bulgaria) Milen Velev	6–4, 7–6
Loss	3–4	Jun 1998	Příbram, Czech Republic	Challenger	Clay	(Czech Republic) Radek Štěpánek	(Czech Republic) Ota Fukárek (Austria) Udo Plamberger	6–2, 3–6, 4–6
Loss	3–5	Nov 1998	Aachen, Germany	Challenger	Hard	(Finland) Tuomas Ketola	(Netherlands) Menno Oosting (Czech Republic) Pavel Vízner	6–7, 3–6
Loss	3–6	Jun 1999	Prague, Czech Republic	Challenger	Clay	(Czech Republic) Tomáš Cibulec	(Czech Republic) Michal Tabara (Czech Republic) Radomír Vašek	2–6, 0–6
Win	4–6	Oct 1999	Eckental, Germany	Challenger	Carpet	(Czech Republic) Pavel Vízner	(Australia) Steven Randjelovic (Croatia) Lovro Zovko	6–4, 6–3
Loss	4–7	Apr 2000	Maia, Portugal	Challenger	Clay	(Czech Republic) Pavel Vízner	(Czech Republic) Tomáš Cibulec (Czech Republic) Leoš Friedl	3–6, 6–4, 4–6
Win	5–7	Aug 2000	Poznań, Poland	Challenger	Clay	(Czech Republic) Pavel Vízner	(Czech Republic) Tomáš Cibulec (Czech Republic) Leoš Friedl	6–3, 6–0
Win	6–7	Nov 2000	Charleroi, Belgium	Challenger	Carpet	(Czech Republic) Pavel Vízner	(North Macedonia) Aleksandar Kitinov (Croatia) Lovro Zovko	6–7, 7–5, 6–1
Loss	6–8	Jan 2003	Heilbronn, Germany	Challenger	Carpet	(Czech Republic) Pavel Vízner	(Sweden) Johan Landsberg (Sweden) Simon Aspelin	4–6, 4–6
Loss	6–9	Feb 2003	Wrocław, Poland	Challenger	Hard	(Czech Republic) Pavel Vízner	(Czech Republic) Petr Luxa (Czech Republic) David Škoch	4–6, 4–6
Win	7–9	May 2004	Ostrava, Czech Republic	Challenger	Clay	(Finland) Tuomas Ketola	(Poland) Łukasz Kubot (Czech Republic) Tomáš Zíb	6–4, 6–4
Loss	7–10	Nov 2004	Aachen, Germany	Challenger	Carpet	(Czech Republic) Petr Luxa	(Sweden) Simon Aspelin (Australia) Todd Perry	3–6, 3–6
Win	8–10	Mar 2006	Sunrise, United States	Challenger	Hard	(Czech Republic) Robin Vik	(United States) Goran Dragicevic (Russia) Dmitry Tursunov	6–4, 6–2
Win	9–10	May 2006	Prague, Czech Republic	Challenger	Clay	(Czech Republic) David Škoch	(Paraguay) Ramón Delgado (Argentina) Sergio Roitman	6–0, 6–0
Win	10–10	May 2008	Prague, Czech Republic	Challenger	Clay	(Czech Republic) Lukáš Dlouhý	(Czech Republic) Dušan Karol (Czech Republic) Jaroslav Pospíšil	6–7^{(2–7)}, 6–4, [10–6]
