= 2002 Australian Open – Men's doubles =

Tennis tournament

Men's doubles
- 2002 Australian Open

Final
- Champion: (The Bahamas) Mark Knowles (Canada) Daniel Nestor
- Runner-up: (France) Michaël Llodra (France) Fabrice Santoro
- Score: 7–6^{(7–4)}, 6–3

Details
- Draw: 64
- Seeds: 16

Events
Singles	men	women		boys	girls
Doubles	men	women	mixed	boys	girls
WC Singles	men	women	quad
WC Doubles	men	women	quad
Legends	men	women	mixed
- Australian Open

Jonas Björkman and Todd Woodbridge were the defending champions, but lost in the second round to Tomáš Cibulec and Daniel Vacek.

Mark Knowles and Daniel Nestor defeated Michaël Llodra and Fabrice Santoro 7–6^{(7–4)}, 6–3 in the final to win the men's doubles title.

== Seeds ==
1. (Sweden) Jonas Björkman / (Australia) Todd Woodbridge (second round)
2. (United States) Donald Johnson / (United States) Jared Palmer (semifinals)
3. (India) Mahesh Bhupathi / (India) Leander Paes (second round)
4. (Czech Republic) Jiří Novák / (Czech Republic) David Rikl (second round)
5. (Zimbabwe) Wayne Black / (Zimbabwe) Kevin Ullyett (quarterfinals)
6. (Australia) Joshua Eagle / (Australia) Sandon Stolle (third round)
7. (Czech Republic) Petr Pála / (Czech Republic) Pavel Vízner (third round)
8. (South Africa) Ellis Ferreira / (United States) Rick Leach (quarterfinals)
9. (The Bahamas) Mark Knowles / (Canada) Daniel Nestor (champions)
10. (United States) Bob Bryan / (United States) Mike Bryan (quarterfinals)
11. (United States) David Adams / (United States) Jeff Tarango (third round)
12. (United States) Brian MacPhie / (Federal Republic of Yugoslavia) Nenad Zimonjić (second round)
13. (Czech Republic) Martin Damm / (Germany) David Prinosil (quarterfinals)
14. (South Africa) Wayne Ferreira / (Russia) Yevgeny Kafelnikov (second round)
15. (Australia) Wayne Arthurs / (Australia) Michael Hill (second round)
16. (Zimbabwe) Byron Black / (Netherlands) Sjeng Schalken (third round)

== Draw ==
Key

- Q = Qualifier
- WC = Wild card
- LL = Lucky loser
- Alt = Alternate
- ITF = ITF entry
- PR = Protected ranking
- SR = Special ranking
- SE = Special exempt
- JE = Junior exempt
- JR = Junior Accelerator Programme entrant
- CO = College Accelerator Programme entrant
- NG = Next Gen Accelerator Program entrant
- w/o = Walkover
- r = Retired
- d = Defaulted

=== Finals ===
Quarterfinals
(France) Julien Boutter (France) Arnaud Clément	6	6
5	(Zimbabwe) Wayne Black (Zimbabwe) Kevin Ullyett	1	3
(France) Michaël Llodra (France) Fabrice Santoro	6	3	8
8	(South Africa) Ellis Ferreira (United States) Rick Leach	2	6	6
9	(The Bahamas) Mark Knowles (Canada) Daniel Nestor	6	6
13	(Czech Republic) Martin Damm (Germany) David Prinosil	2	2
10	(United States) Bob Bryan (United States) Mike Bryan	4	4
2	(United States) Donald Johnson (United States) Jared Palmer	6	6

Semifinals
(France) Julien Boutter (France) Arnaud Clément	3	6	10
(France) Michaël Llodra (France) Fabrice Santoro	6	3	12
9	(The Bahamas) Mark Knowles (Canada) Daniel Nestor	6	6
2	(United States) Donald Johnson (United States) Jared Palmer	1	4

Final
(France) Michaël Llodra (France) Fabrice Santoro	6^{4}	3
9	(The Bahamas) Mark Knowles (Canada) Daniel Nestor	7	6

=== Top half ===
First round
1	(Sweden) J Björkman (Australia) T Woodbridge	6	6
(Argentina) M García (Czech Republic) C Suk	2	3
(Czech Republic) T Cibulec (Czech Republic) D Vacek	7	7
WC	(Australia) J Crabb (Australia) R Fromberg	6^{3}	6^{3}
(France) J Boutter (France) A Clement	7	6
(Australia) P Hanley (Australia) N Healey	6^{5}	2
(Argentina) S Roitman (Argentina) A Schneiter	3	1
14	(South Africa) W Ferreira (Russia) Y Kafelnikov	6	6
11	(South Africa) D Adams (United States) J Tarango	6	6
(South Africa) J-L de Jager (South Africa) R Koenig	4	3
(Philippines) E Taino (Belgium) T Vanhoudt	6	4	3
(Sweden) S Aspelin (Australia) A Kratzmann	3	6	6
(Australia) A Florent (Australia) D Macpherson	7	6
(Israel) J Erlich (Israel) A Ram	5	3
WC	(Australia) S Draper (Australia) B Ellwood	4	5
5	(Zimbabwe) W Black (Zimbabwe) K Ullyett	6	7

Second round
1	(Sweden) J Björkman (Australia) T Woodbridge	3	4
(Czech Republic) T Cibulec (Czech Republic) D Vacek	6	6
(France) J Boutter (France) A Clement	4
14	(South Africa) W Ferreira (Russia) Y Kafelnikov	1	r
11	(South Africa) D Adams (United States) J Tarango	6	6
(Sweden) S Aspelin (Australia) A Kratzmann	4	2
(Australia) A Florent (Australia) D Macpherson	4	1
5	(Zimbabwe) W Black (Zimbabwe) K Ullyett	6	6

Third round
(Czech Republic) T Cibulec (Czech Republic) D Vacek	4	6^{4}
(France) J Boutter (France) A Clement	6	7
11	(South Africa) D Adams (United States) J Tarango	6^{4}	2
5	(Zimbabwe) W Black (Zimbabwe) K Ullyett	7	6

Quarterfinals
(France) J Boutter (France) A Clement	6	6
5	(Zimbabwe) W Black (Zimbabwe) K Ullyett	1	3

=== Section 2 ===
First round
3	(India) M Bhupathi (India) L Paes	6	5	7
(Austria) J Knowle (Germany) M Kohlmann	2	7	5
(North Macedonia) A Kitinov (Sweden) J Landsberg	5	1
(France) M Llodra (France) F Santoro	6	6
(Argentina) L Arnold Ker (Argentina) G Cañas	6	7
(United States) J Gimelstob (United States) J Stark	2	5
WC	(Australia) D Hodge (Australia) P Luczak	6	3	6
15	(Australia) W Arthurs (Australia) M Hill	2	6	8
12	(United States) B MacPhie; N Zimonjić	6	6
(Spain) E Benfele Álvarez (Spain) A Portas	4	1
(Czech Republic) O Fukárek (Czech Republic) D Škoch	6	6^{5}	6
(Czech Republic) L Friedl (Czech Republic) R Štěpánek	4	7	8
(Russia) D Golovanov (Hungary) A Sávolt	4	3
(Argentina) G Etlis (Argentina) M Hood	6	6
(United States) S Humphries (Sweden) P Nyborg	1	3
8	(South Africa) E Ferreira (United States) R Leach	6	6

Second round
3	(India) M Bhupathi (India) L Paes	3	4
(France) M Llodra (France) F Santoro	6	6
(Argentina) L Arnold Ker (Argentina) G Cañas	6	6
15	(Australia) W Arthurs (Australia) M Hill	2	4
12	(United States) B MacPhie; N Zimonjić	4	4
(Czech Republic) L Friedl (Czech Republic) R Štěpánek	6	6
(Argentina) G Etlis (Argentina) M Hood	0	6	7
8	(South Africa) E Ferreira (United States) R Leach	6	2	9

Third round
(France) M Llodra (France) F Santoro	6	6
(Argentina) L Arnold Ker (Argentina) G Cañas	4	1
(Czech Republic) L Friedl (Czech Republic) R Štěpánek	3	4
8	(South Africa) E Ferreira (United States) R Leach	6	6

Quarterfinals
(France) M Llodra (France) F Santoro	6	3	8
8	(South Africa) E Ferreira (United States) R Leach	2	6	6

=== Bottom half ===
==== Section 3 ====
First round
6	(Australia) J Eagle (Australia) S Stolle	6	7
(Czech Republic) F Čermák (Czech Republic) P Luxa	2	6^{3}
(Spain) J Balcells (Spain) T Robredo	3	7	0
(Italy) C Brandi (Italy) M Bertolini	6	6^{10}	6
(Italy) E Artoni (Brazil) D Melo	6	6
WC	(Australia) P Baccanello (Australia) L Smith	4	4
(Germany) K Braasch (Brazil) A Sá	3	6	5
9	(The Bahamas) M Knowles (Canada) D Nestor	6	1	7
13	(Czech Republic) M Damm (Germany) D Prinosil	6	6
(Georgia (country)) I Labadze (Belarus) V Voltchkov	3	2
(Switzerland) G Bastl (South Africa) C Haggard	3	4
(Australia) J Kerr (Australia) G Silcock	6	6
ALT	(San Marino) S Galvani (Finland) T Ketola	3	4
(United States) D Bowen (Australia) A Fisher	6	6
(South Africa) P Rosner (United States) J Waite	4	6^{4}
4	(Czech Republic) J Novák (Czech Republic) D Rikl	6	7

Second round
6	(Australia) J Eagle (Australia) S Stolle	6	3	6
(Italy) C Brandi (Italy) M Bertolini	4	6	1
(Italy) E Artoni (Brazil) D Melo	2	3
9	(The Bahamas) M Knowles (Canada) D Nestor	6	6
13	(Czech Republic) M Damm (Germany) D Prinosil	5	6	6
(Australia) J Kerr (Australia) G Silcock	7	1	3
(United States) D Bowen (Australia) A Fisher	6^{5}	6	6
4	(Czech Republic) J Novák (Czech Republic) D Rikl	7	4	3

Third round
6	(Australia) J Eagle (Australia) S Stolle	6	6^{4}	2
9	(The Bahamas) M Knowles (Canada) D Nestor	2	7	6
13	(Czech Republic) M Damm (Germany) D Prinosil	4	6	6
(United States) D Bowen (Australia) A Fisher	6	2	3

Quarterfinals
9	(The Bahamas) M Knowles (Canada) D Nestor	6	6
13	(Czech Republic) M Damm (Germany) D Prinosil	2	2

=== Section 4 ===
First round
7	(Czech Republic) P Pála (Czech Republic) P Vízner	7	6
(Australia) T Crichton (United States) G Weiner	5	2
(Australia) S Huss (Australia) L Pearson	3	4
(South Africa) M Barnard (South Africa) J Coetzee	6	6
WC	(Australia) D Petrović (Australia) T Perry	6	6
WC	(Germany) R Schüttler (Russia) M Youzhny	3	4
(United States) J Blake (United States) J-M Gambill	3	3
10	(United States) B Bryan (United States) M Bryan	6	6
16	(Zimbabwe) B Black (Netherlands) S Schalken	6	7
(Argentina) D Orsanic (Argentina) S Prieto	2	6^{3}
(Spain) À Corretja (Spain) C Moyá	6^{2}	4
(Spain) JI Carrasco (Spain) Á López Morón	7	6
(Russia) A Olhovskiy (Japan) T Shimada	6^{6}	4
WC	(Spain) A Costa (Spain) A Martín	7	6
(United States) M Fish (United States) J Morrison	4	4
2	(United States) D Johnson (United States) J Palmer	6	6

Second round
7	(Czech Republic) P Pála (Czech Republic) P Vízner	6	7
(South Africa) M Barnard (South Africa) J Coetzee	4	6^{5}
WC	(Australia) D Petrović (Australia) T Perry	1	2
10	(United States) B Bryan (United States) M Bryan	6	6
16	(Zimbabwe) B Black (Netherlands) S Schalken	6	5	6
(Spain) JI Carrasco (Spain) Á López Morón	4	7	1
WC	(Spain) A Costa (Spain) A Martín	1	3
2	(United States) D Johnson (United States) J Palmer	6	6

Third round
7	(Czech Republic) P Pála (Czech Republic) P Vízner	6	3	2
10	(United States) B Bryan (United States) M Bryan	2	6	6
16	(Zimbabwe) B Black (Netherlands) S Schalken	2	3
2	(United States) D Johnson (United States) J Palmer	6	6

Quarterfinals
10	(United States) B Bryan (United States) M Bryan	4	4
2	(United States) D Johnson (United States) J Palmer	6	6
