= 2002 French Open – Men's doubles =

Men's doubles
- 2002 French Open

Final
- Champions: (Netherlands) Paul Haarhuis (Russia) Yevgeny Kafelnikov
- Runners-up: (The Bahamas) Mark Knowles (Canada) Daniel Nestor
- Score: 7–5, 6–4

Details
- Draw: 64
- Seeds: 16

Events
Singles	men	women		boys	girls
Doubles	men	women	mixed	boys	girls
WC Singles	men	women	quad
WC Doubles	men	women	quad
Legends	−45	45+	women
← 2001 ·	French Open	· 2003 →

Mahesh Bhupathi and Leander Paes were the defending champions, but did not participate together. Paes played with Tomáš Cibulec but they lost in the semifinals to Mark Knowles and Daniel Nestor. Bhupathi partnered with Max Mirnyi but they lost in semifinals to Paul Haarhuis and Yevgeny Kafelnikov.

Haarhuis and Kafelnikov went on to win the title, defeating Knowles and Nestor 7–5, 6–4 in the final.

== Seeds ==
1. (United States) Donald Johnson / (United States) Jared Palmer (second round)
2. (The Bahamas) Mark Knowles / (Canada) Daniel Nestor (final)
3. (India) Mahesh Bhupathi / (Belarus) Max Mirnyi (semifinals)
4. (Zimbabwe) Wayne Black / (Zimbabwe) Kevin Ullyett (third round)
5. (United States) Bob Bryan / (United States) Mike Bryan (quarterfinals)
6. (Sweden) Jonas Björkman / (Australia) Todd Woodbridge (quarterfinals)
7. (Czech Republic) Martin Damm / (Czech Republic) Cyril Suk (quarterfinals)
8. (South Africa) Ellis Ferreira / (United States) Jeff Tarango (first round)
9. (Germany) David Prinosil / (Czech Republic) David Rikl (third round)
10. (Czech Republic) Jiří Novák / (Czech Republic) Radek Štěpánek (first round)
11. (Australia) Joshua Eagle / (Australia) Sandon Stolle (second round)
12. (Czech Republic) Petr Pála / (Czech Republic) Pavel Vízner (first round)
13. (United States) Rick Leach / (United States) Brian MacPhie (second round)
14. (Czech Republic) Tomáš Cibulec / (India) Leander Paes (semifinals)
15. (France) Julien Boutter / (Netherlands) Sjeng Schalken (first round)
16. (France) Michaël Llodra / (France) Fabrice Santoro (second round)

== Main draw ==
=== Key ===
- Q = Qualifier
- WC = Wild card
- LL = Lucky loser
- Alt = Alternate
- ITF = ITF entry
- PR = Protected ranking
- SR = Special ranking
- SE = Special exempt
- JE = Junior exempt
- JR = Junior Accelerator Programme entrant
- CO = College Accelerator Programme entrant
- NG = Next Gen Accelerator Program entrant
- w/o = Walkover
- r = Retired
- d = Defaulted

=== Finals ===
Quarterfinals
(Netherlands) Paul Haarhuis (Russia) Yevgeny Kafelnikov	1	7^{8}	8
6	(Sweden) Jonas Björkman (Australia) Todd Woodbridge	6	6^{6}	6
3	(India) Mahesh Bhupathi (Belarus) Max Mirnyi	4	6	7
7	(Czech Republic) Martin Damm (Czech Republic) Cyril Suk	6	4	5
5	(United States) Bob Bryan (United States) Mike Bryan	6	6^{6}	4
14	(Czech Republic) Tomáš Cibulec (India) Leander Paes	3	7^{8}	6
(Australia) Wayne Arthurs (Australia) Paul Hanley	6^{1}	2
2	(The Bahamas) Mark Knowles (Canada) Daniel Nestor	7^{7}	6

Semifinals
(Netherlands) Paul Haarhuis (Russia) Yevgeny Kafelnikov	6^{1}	7	6
3	(India) Mahesh Bhupathi (Belarus) Max Mirnyi	7^{7}	5	2
14	(Czech Republic) Tomáš Cibulec (India) Leander Paes	6^{5}	5
2	(The Bahamas) Mark Knowles (Canada) Daniel Nestor	7^{7}	7

Final
(Netherlands) Paul Haarhuis (Russia) Yevgeny Kafelnikov	7	6
2	(The Bahamas) Mark Knowles (Canada) Daniel Nestor	5	4

=== Top half ===
==== Section 1 ====
First round
1	(United States) D Johnson (United States) J Palmer	6	6
(Austria) J Knowle (Germany) M Kohlmann	2	2
(Spain) JI Carrasco (Spain) Á López Morón	2	3
(Argentina) L Arnold Ker (Argentina) G Etlis	6	6
(Australia) T Crichton (Australia) T Perry	6	3	6
(Germany) K Braasch (Russia) A Olhovskiy	3	6	3
(Netherlands) P Haarhuis (Russia) Y Kafelnikov	6	3	6
15	(France) J Boutter (Netherlands) S Schalken	2	6	3
11	(Australia) J Eagle (Australia) S Stolle	7^{7}	6
(Israel) J Erlich (Brazil) D Melo	6^{5}	1
(Australia) M Hill (Czech Republic) D Vacek	4	2
(Zimbabwe) B Black (South Africa) J Coetzee	6	6
(United States) J Blake (United States) S Humphries	6	6
WC	(France) J-F Bachelot (France) N Coutelot	4	2
(The Bahamas) M Merklein (United States) E Taino	2	3
6	(Sweden) J Björkman (Australia) T Woodbridge	6	6

Second round
1	(United States) D Johnson (United States) J Palmer	6	3	4
(Argentina) L Arnold Ker (Argentina) G Etlis	1	6	6
(Australia) T Crichton (Australia) T Perry	5	3
(Netherlands) P Haarhuis (Russia) Y Kafelnikov	7	6
11	(Australia) J Eagle (Australia) S Stolle	1	6	4
(Zimbabwe) B Black (South Africa) J Coetzee	6	2	6
(United States) J Blake (United States) S Humphries	2	1
6	(Sweden) J Björkman (Australia) T Woodbridge	6	6

Third round
(Argentina) L Arnold Ker (Argentina) G Etlis	1	2
(Netherlands) P Haarhuis (Russia) Y Kafelnikov	6	6
(Zimbabwe) B Black (South Africa) J Coetzee	3	2
6	(Sweden) J Björkman (Australia) T Woodbridge	6	6

Quarterfinals
(Netherlands) P Haarhuis (Russia) Y Kafelnikov	1	7^{8}	8
6	(Sweden) J Björkman (Australia) T Woodbridge	6	6^{6}	6

==== Section 2 ====
First round
3	(India) M Bhupathi (Belarus) M Mirnyi	7	7^{7}
(South Africa) R Koenig (Japan) T Shimada	5	6^{5}
(Switzerland) G Bastl (Spain) A Portas	6	6
(South Africa) P Rosner (United States) G Weiner	4	4
(South Africa) S Rudman (Czech Republic) D Škoch	3	6	2
(Czech Republic) F Čermák (Czech Republic) O Fukárek	6	2	6
(North Macedonia) A Kitinov (Sweden) J Landsberg	2	6	2
13	(United States) R Leach (United States) B MacPhie	6	2	6
12	(Czech Republic) P Pála (Czech Republic) P Vízner	4	3
(South Africa) D Adams (Romania) A Pavel	6	6
(Argentina) D Orsanic (Argentina) M Rodríguez	4	6	4
(Slovakia) D Hrbatý (Brazil) A Sá	6	3	6
WC	(France) T Ascione (France) É Prodon	3	2
(South Africa) W Ferreira (United States) J-M Gambill	6	6
(Sweden) S Aspelin (Australia) A Kratzmann	2	4
7	(Czech Republic) M Damm (Czech Republic) C Suk	6	6

Second round
3	(India) M Bhupathi (Belarus) M Mirnyi	6	6
(Switzerland) G Bastl (Spain) A Portas	2	4
(Czech Republic) F Čermák (Czech Republic) O Fukárek	6	6
13	(United States) R Leach (United States) B MacPhie	4	4
(South Africa) D Adams (Romania) A Pavel	6	3	2
(Slovakia) D Hrbatý (Brazil) A Sá	3	6	6
(South Africa) W Ferreira (United States) J-M Gambill	5	2
7	(Czech Republic) M Damm (Czech Republic) C Suk	7	6

Third round
3	(India) M Bhupathi (Belarus) M Mirnyi	6^{6}	6	6
(Czech Republic) F Čermák (Czech Republic) O Fukárek	7^{8}	2	3
(Slovakia) D Hrbatý (Brazil) A Sá	3	3
7	(Czech Republic) M Damm (Czech Republic) C Suk	6	6

Quarterfinals
3	(India) M Bhupathi (Belarus) M Mirnyi	4	6	7
7	(Czech Republic) M Damm (Czech Republic) C Suk	6	4	5

=== Bottom half ===
==== Section 3 ====
First round
5	(United States) B Bryan (United States) M Bryan	6	6
WC	(France) O Patience (France) J Varlet	1	4
(United States) J Thomas (Belgium) T Vanhoudt	4	6	6
(Germany) J Knippschild (Germany) R Schüttler	6	4	2
WC	(France) A Dupuis (France) P-H Mathieu	2	6	6
(South Africa) M Barnard (South Africa) J-L de Jager	6	4	4
(South Africa) C Haggard (Romania) G Trifu	1	5
9	(Germany) D Prinosil (Czech Republic) D Rikl	6	7
14	(Czech Republic) T Cibulec (India) L Paes	6	6
(Italy) M Bertolini (Italy) C Brandi	0	2
(United States) M Fish (United States) J Morrison	3	7^{8}	6
WC	(France) G Carraz (France) N Mahut	6	6^{6}	4
(Spain) J Balcells (Argentina) E Massa	6	6
(Czech Republic) L Friedl (Czech Republic) P Luxa	3	4
WC	(France) R Gasquet (France) J-W Tsonga	4	4
4	(Zimbabwe) W Black (Zimbabwe) K Ullyett	6	6

Second round
5	(United States) B Bryan (United States) M Bryan	4	6	9
(United States) J Thomas (Belgium) T Vanhoudt	6	1	7
WC	(France) A Dupuis (France) P-H Mathieu	2	2
9	(Germany) D Prinosil (Czech Republic) D Rikl	6	6
14	(Czech Republic) T Cibulec (India) L Paes	6	7^{7}
(United States) M Fish (United States) J Morrison	4	6^{4}
(Spain) J Balcells (Argentina) E Massa	7^{7}	4	1
4	(Zimbabwe) W Black (Zimbabwe) K Ullyett	6^{4}	6	6

Third round
5	(United States) B Bryan (United States) M Bryan	6	1	7
9	(Germany) D Prinosil (Czech Republic) D Rikl	3	6	5
14	(Czech Republic) T Cibulec (India) L Paes	4	7^{7}	6
4	(Zimbabwe) W Black (Zimbabwe) K Ullyett	6	6^{3}	3

Quarterfinals
5	(United States) B Bryan (United States) M Bryan	6	6^{6}	4
14	(Czech Republic) T Cibulec (India) L Paes	3	7^{8}	6

==== Section 4 ====
First round
8	(South Africa) E Ferreira (United States) J Tarango	2	5
(Argentina) A Schneiter (Argentina) S Roitman	6	7
(Switzerland) Y Allegro (Croatia) L Zovko	4	4
(Australia) S Huss (South Africa) M Wakefield	6	6
(Argentina) M García (Argentina) L Lobo	6^{6}	5
(Australia) W Arthurs (Australia) P Hanley	7^{8}	7
WC	(France) J Benneteau (France) A Di Pasquale	6	6
10	(Czech Republic) J Novák (Czech Republic) R Štěpánek	4	2
16	(France) M Llodra (France) F Santoro	6	7^{7}
(Australia) B Ellwood (Australia) N Healey	1	6^{4}
(Argentina) M Hood (Argentina) S Prieto	6	6
(Australia) A Florent (Australia) D Macpherson	4	4
(Australia) J Kerr (Australia) G Silcock	7	6
(South Africa) N Godwin (Belarus) V Voltchkov	5	2
(United States) D Bowen (Australia) A Fisher	3	6^{2}
2	(The Bahamas) M Knowles (Canada) D Nestor	6	7^{7}

Second round
(Argentina) A Schneiter (Argentina) S Roitman	6	3	6
(Australia) S Huss (South Africa) M Wakefield	3	6	0
(Australia) W Arthurs (Australia) P Hanley	4	6	6
WC	(France) J Benneteau (France) A Di Pasquale	6	4	4
16	(France) M Llodra (France) F Santoro	5	7^{8}	4
(Argentina) M Hood (Argentina) S Prieto	7	6^{6}	6
(Australia) J Kerr (Australia) G Silcock	7	6^{5}	1
2	(The Bahamas) M Knowles (Canada) D Nestor	5	7^{7}	6

Third round
(Argentina) A Schneiter (Argentina) S Roitman	5	2
(Australia) W Arthurs (Australia) P Hanley	7	6
(Argentina) M Hood (Argentina) S Prieto	1	2
2	(The Bahamas) M Knowles (Canada) D Nestor	6	6

Quarterfinals
(Australia) W Arthurs (Australia) P Hanley	6^{1}	2
2	(The Bahamas) M Knowles (Canada) D Nestor	7^{7}	6
