= 2002 Australian Open – Women's singles =

Women's singles
- 2002 Australian Open

Final
- Champion: (United States) Jennifer Capriati
- Runner-up: (Switzerland) Martina Hingis
- Score: 4–6, 7–6^{(9–7)}, 6–2

Details
- Draw: 128
- Seeds: 32

Events
Singles	men	women		boys	girls
Doubles	men	women	mixed	boys	girls
WC Singles	men	women	quad
WC Doubles	men	women	quad
Legends	men	women	mixed
- Australian Open

Defending champion Jennifer Capriati defeated Martina Hingis in a rematch of the previous year's final, 4–6, 7–6^{(9–7)}, 6–2 to win the women's singles tennis title at the 2002 Australian Open. It was her second Australian Open title and her third and last major singles title overall. Capriati saved four championship points to win the title. This was Hingis' third consecutive defeat in the Australian Open final, following three consecutive victories.

This tournament marked the major debuts of future world No. 2 and two-time major champion Svetlana Kuznetsova, who lost to Iroda Tulyaganova in the second round, and future world No. 4 and US Open champion Samantha Stosur, who lost in the first round to Gréta Arn.

== The final ==
In a repeat of the previous year's final, three-time former champion Hingis won the first set 6–4 having led 5–1 at one stage. Hingis then took a 4–0 lead in the second set, and held three championship points, once at 5-3, and twice at 6–5, but Capriati fought back to take the set into a tiebreaker. There Hingis held another championship point at 7–6, but Capriati saved it and eventually won the tiebreaker 9–7. Hingis then broke Capriati's serve in the third set to lead 2–1, but defending champion Capriati won the next five games to complete a 4–6, 7–6^{(9–7)}, 6–2 victory. In doing so she gained the record for the most championship points saved in a major final.

== Seeds ==
The seeded players are listed below. Jennifer Capriati is the champion; others show the round in which they were eliminated.

1. (United States) Jennifer Capriati (champion)
2. (United States) Venus Williams (quarterfinals)
3. (Switzerland) Martina Hingis (final)
4. (Belgium) Kim Clijsters (semifinals)
5. (United States) Serena Williams (withdrew)
6. (Belgium) Justine Henin (quarterfinals)
7. (France) Amélie Mauresmo (quarterfinals)
8. (United States) Monica Seles (semifinals)
9. (France) Sandrine Testud (first round)
10. (United States) Meghann Shaughnessy (third round)
11. (Italy) Silvia Farina Elia (third round)
12. (Russia) Elena Dementieva (fourth round)
13. (Bulgaria) Magdalena Maleeva (fourth round)
14. (Spain) Arantxa Sánchez Vicario (first round)
15. (South Africa) Amanda Coetzer (fourth round)
16. (Uzbekistan) Iroda Tulyaganova (third round)
17. (Austria) Barbara Schett (third round)
18. (United States) Lisa Raymond (third round)
19. (Spain) Ángeles Montolio (first round)
20. (Italy) Rita Grande (fourth round)
21. (Czech Republic) Dája Bedáňová (second round)
22. (Slovakia) Henrieta Nagyová (first round)
23. (Spain) Magüi Serna (third round)
24. (Japan) Ai Sugiyama (third round)
25. (Thailand) Tamarine Tanasugarn (third round)
26. (Spain) Cristina Torrens Valero (first round)
27. (Argentina) Paola Suárez (first round)
28. (Luxembourg) Anne Kremer (second round)
29. (Russia) Tatiana Panova (second round)
30. (Russia) Elena Likhovtseva (first round)
31. (Italy) Francesca Schiavone (third round)
32. (Slovakia) Daniela Hantuchová (third round)
33. (Russia) Lina Krasnoroutskaya (first round)

== Draw ==
Key

- Q = Qualifier
- WC = Wild card
- LL = Lucky loser
- Alt = Alternate
- ITF = ITF entry
- PR = Protected ranking
- SR = Special ranking
- SE = Special exempt
- JE = Junior exempt
- JR = Junior Accelerator Programme entrant
- CO = College Accelerator Programme entrant
- NG = Next Gen Accelerator Program entrant
- w/o = Walkover
- r = Retired
- d = Defaulted

=== Finals ===
Quarterfinals
1	(United States) Jennifer Capriati	6	6
7	(France) Amélie Mauresmo	2	2
4	(Belgium) Kim Clijsters	6	6
6	(Belgium) Justine Henin	2	3
(Italy) Adriana Serra Zanetti	2	3
3	(Switzerland) Martina Hingis	6	6
8	(United States) Monica Seles	6^{4}	6	6
2	(United States) Venus Williams	7^{7}	2	3

Semifinals
1	(United States) Jennifer Capriati	7	3	6
4	(Belgium) Kim Clijsters	5	6	1
3	(Switzerland) Martina Hingis	4	6	6
8	(United States) Monica Seles	6	1	4

Finals
1	(United States) Jennifer Capriati	4	7^{9}	6
3	(Switzerland) Martina Hingis	6	6^{7}	2

=== Top half ===
==== Section 1 ====
First round
1	(United States) J Capriati	6	6
(Croatia) S Talaja	4	1
(United States) M Tu	7^{7}	6
(South Africa) J Kruger	6^{2}	0
(Hungary) R Kuti-Kis	6	6^{2}	4
(Greece) E Daniilidou	4	7^{7}	6
(Australia) A Molik	6	3	8
29	(Russia) T Panova	1	6	10
20	(Italy) R Grande	7^{7}	6
Q	(Argentina) C Fernández	6^{4}	4
Q	(Italy) G Pizzichini	3	3
Q	(Netherlands) K Boogert	6	6
Q	(Russia) S Kuznetsova	6	2	6
WC	(South Korea) Y-j Cho	3	6	4
Q	(Argentina) ME Salerni	3	4
16	(Uzbekistan) I Tulyaganova	6	6

Second round
1	(United States) J Capriati	6	6
(United States) M Tu	1	3
(Greece) E Daniilidou	6	4	6
29	(Russia) T Panova	2	6	0
20	(Italy) R Grande	7^{7}	7
Q	(Netherlands) K Boogert	6^{4}	5
Q	(Russia) S Kuznetsova	4	1
16	(Uzbekistan) I Tulyaganova	6	6

Third round
1	(United States) J Capriati	6	3	6
(Greece) E Daniilidou	2	6	1
20	(Italy) R Grande	6	5	6
16	(Uzbekistan) I Tulyaganova	3	7	4

Fourth round
1	(United States) J Capriati	6	7^{11}
20	(Italy) R Grande	3	6^{9}

==== Section 2 ====
First round
10	(United States) M Shaughnessy	6^{5}	6	7
(United States) A Stevenson	7^{7}	2	5
WC	(Australia) B Stewart	6	6
(Canada) J Nejedly	4	4
Q	(Italy) An Serra Zanetti	6	2	7
(Russia) E Bovina	2	6	5
(Germany) M Weingärtner	6	6
19	(Spain) Á Montolio	3	3
25	(Thailand) T Tanasugarn	6	6
(Tunisia) S Sfar	4	3
(Hungary) P Mandula	6	6
(Germany) A Barna	4	4
(Slovenia) K Srebotnik	6	6
(Israel) A Smashnova	2	2
(Chinese Taipei) J Lee	1	0
7	(France) A Mauresmo	6	6

Second round
10	(United States) M Shaughnessy	6	6
WC	(Australia) B Stewart	2	0
Q	(Italy) An Serra Zanetti	4	2
(Germany) M Weingärtner	6	6
25	(Thailand) T Tanasugarn	2	6	6
(Hungary) P Mandula	6	2	2
(Slovenia) K Srebotnik	5	3
7	(France) A Mauresmo	7	6

Third round
10	(United States) M Shaughnessy	2	6	3
(Germany) M Weingärtner	6	3	6
25	(Thailand) T Tanasugarn	6^{3}	1
7	(France) A Mauresmo	7^{7}	6

Fourth round
(Germany) M Weingärtner	0	6	5
7	(France) A Mauresmo	6	4	7

==== Section 3 ====
First round
4	(Belgium) K Clijsters	6	6
WC	(Australia) C Wheeler	2	1
(Austria) B Schwartz	6	6
Q	(Denmark) E Dyrberg	1	4
(Spain) MJ Martínez Sánchez	3	3
WC	(Australia) C Watson	6	6
(Switzerland) E Gagliardi	6	6^{7}	8
30	(Russia) E Likhovtseva	1	7^{9}	6
24	(Japan) A Sugiyama	6^{7}	6	6
(Australia) R McQuillan	7^{9}	3	3
(Slovenia) T Pisnik	6	4	9
WC	(France) M Bartoli	3	6	7
(Slovakia) J Husárová	6	6
LL	(New Zealand) P Nola	1	0
(Croatia) I Majoli	6	7
14	(Spain) A Sánchez Vicario	4	5

Second round
4	(Belgium) K Clijsters	6	6
(Austria) B Schwartz	1	1
WC	(Australia) C Watson	3	7	6
(Switzerland) E Gagliardi	6	5	2
24	(Japan) A Sugiyama	7^{7}	6
(Slovenia) T Pisnik	6^{2}	0
(Slovakia) J Husárová	6	6
(Croatia) I Majoli	4	3

Third round
4	(Belgium) K Clijsters	6	6
WC	(Australia) C Watson	1	2
24	(Japan) A Sugiyama	2	3
(Slovakia) J Husárová	6	6

Fourth round
4	(Belgium) K Clijsters	6	6
(Slovakia) J Husárová	0	2

==== Section 4 ====
First round
12	(Russia) E Dementieva	6	6
(Russia) A Jidkova	3	2
(Indonesia) W Prakusya	7^{7}	2	2
(Russia) A Myskina	6^{3}	6	6
(Japan) S Obata	5	4
(Italy) ME Camerin	7	6
WC	(Australia) A Grahame	3	3
23	(Spain) M Serna	6	6
27	(Argentina) P Suárez	3	4
(Germany) M Müller	6	6
(Hungary) Z Gubacsi	7^{8}	2	3
(Australia) N Pratt	6^{6}	6	6
(Spain) M Marrero	6	6
(Czech Republic) A Gerši	4	2
(Russia) A Kournikova	2	5
6	(Belgium) J Henin	6	7

Second round
12	(Russia) E Dementieva	6	6
(Russia) A Myskina	4	2
(Italy) ME Camerin	3	3
23	(Spain) M Serna	6	6
(Germany) M Müller	1	2
(Australia) N Pratt	6	6
(Spain) M Marrero	3	6	1
6	(Belgium) J Henin	6	3	6

Third round
12	(Russia) E Dementieva	6	6
23	(Spain) M Serna	1	2
(Australia) N Pratt	4	0
6	(Belgium) J Henin	6	6

Fourth round
12	(Russia) E Dementieva	0	3
6	(Belgium) J Henin	6	6

=== Bottom half ===
==== Section 5 ====
First round
33	(Russia) L Krasnoroutskaya	6	3	0^{r}
(Spain) C Martínez	3	6	2
(Sweden) A Svensson	6	6
(Australia) E Dominikovic	3	2
(Slovakia) M Suchá	1	6	6
(Spain) G León García	6	2	4
(Argentina) M Díaz Oliva	7	6
26	(Spain) C Torrens Valero	5	4
22	(Slovakia) H Nagyová	5	4
(United States) A Frazier	7	6
(Italy) Ad Serra Zanetti	6	2	7
(Spain) V Ruano Pascual	2	6	5
(Kazakhstan) I Selyutina	2	6	2
(United States) J Hopkins	6	0	6
(United States) L Osterloh	4	6	4
11	(Italy) S Farina Elia	6	3	6

Second round
(Spain) C Martínez	4	1
(Sweden) A Svensson	6	6
(Slovakia) M Suchá	6	7
(Argentina) M Díaz Oliva	1	5
(United States) A Frazier	3	6^{5}
(Italy) Ad Serra Zanetti	6	7^{7}
(United States) J Hopkins	2	0
11	(Italy) S Farina Elia	6	6

Third round
(Sweden) A Svensson	0	4
(Slovakia) M Suchá	6	6
(Italy) Ad Serra Zanetti	6	4	6
11	(Italy) S Farina Elia	2	6	4

Fourth round
(Slovakia) M Suchá	1	5
(Italy) Ad Serra Zanetti	6	7

==== Section 6 ====
First round
15	(South Africa) A Coetzer	6	6
(Netherlands) M Oremans	1	1
Q	(Ukraine) E Tatarkova	3	2
(Paraguay) R Neffa-de los Ríos	6	6
(Spain) N Llagostera Vives	6	6
(Germany) J Kandarr	0	1
(Germany) A Glass	2	4
17	(Austria) B Schett	6	6
28	(Luxembourg) A Kremer	6	6
(Czech Republic) D Chládková	3	4
(Germany) B Rittner	6	6
(Spain) E Bes	3	4
Q	(Germany) G Arn	6	4	6
WC	(Australia) S Stosur	2	6	2
(France) V Razzano	2	2
3	(Switzerland) M Hingis	6	6

Second round
15	(South Africa) A Coetzer	6	6
(Paraguay) R Neffa-de los Ríos	3	1
(Spain) N Llagostera Vives	2	6	2
17	(Austria) B Schett	6	1	6
28	(Luxembourg) A Kremer	1	4
(Germany) B Rittner	6	6
Q	(Germany) G Arn	1	2
3	(Switzerland) M Hingis	6	6

Third round
15	(South Africa) A Coetzer	6	6
17	(Austria) B Schett	3	3
(Germany) B Rittner	1	0
3	(Switzerland) M Hingis	6	6

Fourth round
15	(South Africa) A Coetzer	1	0
3	(Switzerland) M Hingis	6	6

==== Section 7 ====
First round
8	(United States) M Seles	6	6
(Switzerland) P Schnyder	1	2
(Zimbabwe) C Black	7	6
(France) É Loit	5	3
(United States) S Reeves	0	7^{8}	3
Q	(Croatia) J Kostanić	6	6^{6}	6
(Hungary) A Kapros	6	3	6
31	(Italy) F Schiavone	4	6	8
21	(Czech Republic) D Bedáňová	6	6
(Belarus) T Poutchek	1	2
Q	(Morocco) B Mouhtassine	2	6	1
(Spain) A Medina Garrigues	6	4	6
(France) C Beigbeder	7	5	2
(Germany) B Lamade	5	7	6
(France) N Dechy	7	4	6
9	(France) S Testud	5	6	3

Second round
8	(United States) M Seles	6	6
(Zimbabwe) C Black	1	1
Q	(Croatia) J Kostanić	1	2
31	(Italy) F Schiavone	6	6
21	(Czech Republic) D Bedáňová	4	2
(Spain) A Medina Garrigues	6	6
(Germany) B Lamade	3	7^{7}	1
(France) N Dechy	6	6^{4}	6

Third round
8	(United States) M Seles	6	6
31	(Italy) F Schiavone	4	4
(Spain) A Medina Garrigues	6	6
(France) N Dechy	3	2

Fourth round
8	(United States) M Seles	4
(Spain) A Medina Garrigues	2	r

==== Section 8 ====
First round
13	(Bulgaria) M Maleeva	6	6
(Switzerland) M-G Mikaelian	3	4
(Czech Republic) K Hrdličková	4	6	6
(Japan) S Asagoe	6	3	2
WC	(France) M Pierce	0^{r}
(United States) J Craybas	4
(Netherlands) S Noorlander	0	1
18	(United States) L Raymond	6	6
32	(Slovakia) D Hantuchová	6	6
(Slovenia) M Matevžič	3	1
(United States) M Irvin	0	3
(Italy) T Garbin	6	6
(United States) K Brandi	6	4	6
(Slovakia) Ľ Cervanová	3	6	0
Q	(United States) A Cargill	2	2
2	(United States) V Williams	6	6

Second round
13	(Bulgaria) M Maleeva	6	7
(Czech Republic) K Hrdličková	4	5
(United States) J Craybas	3	3
18	(United States) L Raymond	6	6
32	(Slovakia) D Hantuchová	6	6
(Italy) T Garbin	0	2
(United States) K Brandi	3	4
2	(United States) V Williams	6	6

Third round
13	(Bulgaria) M Maleeva	7	6
18	(United States) L Raymond	5	1
32	(Slovakia) D Hantuchová	6	0	4
2	(United States) V Williams	3	6	6

Fourth round
13	(Bulgaria) M Maleeva	0	3
2	(United States) V Williams	6	6

Preceded by 2001 US Open – Women's singles	Grand Slam women's singles	Succeeded by 2002 French Open – Women's singles
