= 2002 Australian Open – Mixed doubles =

Mixed doubles
- 2002 Australian Open

Final
- Champions: (Slovakia) Daniela Hantuchová (Zimbabwe) Kevin Ullyett
- Runners-up: (Argentina) Paola Suárez (Argentina) Gastón Etlis
- Score: 6–3, 6–2

Details
- Draw: 32
- Seeds: 8

Events
Singles	men	women		boys	girls
Doubles	men	women	mixed	boys	girls
WC Singles	men	women	quad
WC Doubles	men	women	quad
Legends	men	women	mixed
- Australian Open

The mixed doubles of the 2002 Australian Open was held for the 58th time since the first tournament back in 1922. Heading into the tournament, Corina Morariu and Ellis Ferreira were the defending champions, but could not defend their title. While Morariu did not compete this year, Ferreira partnered with Cara Black and lost in the first Round to Rita Grande and Jeff Tarango in three sets.

Daniela Hantuchová and Kevin Ullyett won the title, defeating Paola Suárez and Gastón Etlis 6–3, 6–2 in the final. It was the second Grand Slam mixed doubles title for Hantuchová and the only title in mixed doubles for Ullyett, in their respective careers.

== Seeds ==
1. (Australia) Rennae Stubbs / (Australia) Todd Woodbridge (first round)
2. (Russia) Elena Likhovtseva / (India) Mahesh Bhupathi (semifinals)
3. (Spain) Arantxa Sánchez Vicario / (United States) Jared Palmer (first round)
4. (Zimbabwe) Cara Black / (South Africa) Ellis Ferreira (first round)
5. (Belgium) Els Callens / (United States) Donald Johnson (first round)
6. (United States) Lisa Raymond / (United States) Mike Bryan (second round)
7. (South Africa) Liezel Huber / (United States) Rick Leach (second round)
8. (United States) Nicole Arendt / (South Africa) David Adams (first round)

== Draw ==
Key

- Q = Qualifier
- WC = Wild card
- LL = Lucky loser
- Alt = Alternate
- ITF = ITF entry
- PR = Protected ranking
- SR = Special ranking
- SE = Special exempt
- JE = Junior exempt
- JR = Junior Accelerator Programme entrant
- CO = College Accelerator Programme entrant
- NG = Next Gen Accelerator Program entrant
- w/o = Walkover
- r = Retired
- d = Defaulted

=== Finals ===
Semifinals
(Netherlands) Caroline Vis (Australia) Michael Hill	6	4	[7]
(Argentina) Paola Suárez (Argentina) Gastón Etlis	3	6	[10]
(Slovakia) Daniela Hantuchová (Zimbabwe) Kevin Ullyett	3	6	[10]
2	(Russia) Elena Likhovtseva (India) Mahesh Bhupathi	6	4	[6]

Final
(Argentina) Paola Suárez (Argentina) Gastón Etlis	3	2
(Slovakia) Daniela Hantuchová (Zimbabwe) Kevin Ullyett	6	6

=== Top half ===
First round
1	(Australia) R Stubbs (Australia) T Woodbridge	4	1
(Netherlands) C Vis (Australia) M Hill	6	6
(Spain) A Medina Garrigues (Argentina) L Arnold Ker	6	6
(Slovakia) K Habšudová (Czech Republic) D Rikl	2	2
(Slovakia) J Husárová (Czech Republic) P Vízner	6	6
(Italy) R Vinci (Belgium) T Vanhoudt	3	4
(Spain) V Ruano Pascual (Argentina) M García	1	0
6	(United States) L Raymond (United States) M Bryan	6	6
4	(Zimbabwe) C Black (South Africa) E Ferreira	4	6	[9]
(Italy) R Grande (United States) J Tarango	6	4	[11]
WC	(Czech Republic) D Bedáňová (Czech Republic) J Novák	5	6	[10]
WC	(Australia) L McShea (Australia) S Draper	7	2	[2]
WC	(Australia) N Pratt (Australia) A Kratzmann	2	2
(Argentina) P Suárez (Argentina) G Etlis	6	6
(Netherlands) M Oremans (India) L Paes	7^{7}	6
5	(Belgium) E Callens (United States) D Johnson	6^{5}	4

Second round
(Netherlands) C Vis (Australia) M Hill	w/o
(Spain) A Medina Garrigues (Argentina) L Arnold Ker
(Slovakia) J Husárová (Czech Republic) P Vízner	2	7	[10]
6	(United States) L Raymond (United States) M Bryan	6	5	[5]
(Italy) R Grande (United States) J Tarango	w/o
WC	(Czech Republic) D Bedáňová (Czech Republic) J Novák
(Argentina) P Suárez (Argentina) G Etlis	6	6^{0}	[10]
(Netherlands) M Oremans (India) L Paes	4	7^{7}	[5]

Quarterfinals
(Netherlands) C Vis (Australia) M Hill	5	6	[10]
(Slovakia) J Husárová (Czech Republic) P Vízner	7	4	[6]
(Italy) R Grande (United States) J Tarango	6	3	[7]
(Argentina) P Suárez (Argentina) G Etlis	4	6	[10]

Semifinals
(Netherlands) C Vis (Australia) M Hill	6	4	[7]
(Argentina) P Suárez (Argentina) G Etlis	3	6	[10]

=== Bottom half ===
First round
8	(United States) N Arendt (South Africa) D Adams	4	2
(Slovakia) D Hantuchová (Zimbabwe) K Ullyett	6	6
WC	(Australia) E Dominikovic (Australia) B Ellwood	6	6
(Slovenia) T Križan (Czech Republic) C Suk	1	4
(Slovenia) K Srebotnik (United States) B Bryan	6	7^{7}
(Italy) S Farina Elia (The Bahamas) M Knowles	2	6^{0}
WC	(Slovakia) H Nagyová (Czech Republic) M Damm	6	6
3	(Spain) A Sánchez Vicario (United States) J Palmer	4	3
7	(South Africa) L Huber (United States) R Leach	3	6	[10]
(Austria) B Schett (Australia) J Eagle	6	1	[3]
WC	(Australia) S Stosur (Australia) T Reid	4	6	[3]
(Czech Republic) K Hrdličková (Czech Republic) P Pála	6	4	[10]
WC	(Australia) A Molik (Australia) N Healey	1	7^{7}	[6]
WC	(Australia) A Ellwood (Australia) S Stolle	6	6^{1}	[10]
(United States) L McNeil (United States) B MacPhie	4	4
2	(Russia) E Likhovtseva (India) M Bhupathi	6	6

Second round
(Slovakia) D Hantuchová (Zimbabwe) K Ullyett	6	7^{8}
WC	(Australia) E Dominikovic (Australia) B Ellwood	2	6^{6}
(Slovenia) K Srebotnik (United States) B Bryan	6	7^{7}
WC	(Slovakia) H Nagyová (Czech Republic) M Damm	0	6^{2}
7	(South Africa) L Huber (United States) R Leach	5	3
(Czech Republic) K Hrdličková (Czech Republic) P Pála	7	6
WC	(Australia) A Ellwood (Australia) S Stolle	3	2
2	(Russia) E Likhovtseva (India) M Bhupathi	6	6

Quarterfinals
(Slovakia) D Hantuchová (Zimbabwe) K Ullyett	3	6	[10]
(Slovenia) K Srebotnik (United States) B Bryan	6	3	[7]
(Czech Republic) K Hrdličková (Czech Republic) P Pála	1	2
2	(Russia) E Likhovtseva (India) M Bhupathi	6	6

Semifinals
(Slovakia) D Hantuchová (Zimbabwe) K Ullyett	3	6	[10]
2	(Russia) E Likhovtseva (India) M Bhupathi	6	4	[6]
