= 2002 Australian Open – Men's singles =

Men's singles
- 2002 Australian Open

Final
- Champion: (Sweden) Thomas Johansson
- Runner-up: (Russia) Marat Safin
- Score: 3–6, 6–4, 6–4, 7–6^{(7–4)}

Details
- Draw: 128
- Seeds: 32

Events
Singles	men	women		boys	girls
Doubles	men	women	mixed	boys	girls
WC Singles	men	women	quad
WC Doubles	men	women	quad
Legends	men	women	mixed
- Australian Open

Thomas Johansson defeated Marat Safin in the final, 3–6, 6–4, 6–4, 7–6^{(7–4)} to win the men's singles tennis title at the 2002 Australian Open. It was his first and only major title. Johansson was the first Swede to win a major since Stefan Edberg in 1992.

Andre Agassi was the two-time reigning champion, but did not participate due to a wrist injury.

The 2002 edition of the Australian Open marked the first time that the top two seeds lost in the first round, and the first such occurrence of this at any major since the 1990 French Open. Top seed (and home favorite) Lleyton Hewitt lost to Alberto Martín, while second seed Gustavo Kuerten lost to Julien Boutter.

== Seeds ==
The seeded players are listed below. Thomas Johansson is the champion; others show the round in which they were eliminated.

1. (Australia) Lleyton Hewitt (first round)
2. (Brazil) Gustavo Kuerten (first round)
3. (United States) Andre Agassi (withdrew)
4. (Russia) Yevgeny Kafelnikov (second round)
5. (France) Sébastien Grosjean (second round)
6. (United Kingdom) Tim Henman (fourth round)
7. (Germany) Tommy Haas (semifinals)
8. (United States) Pete Sampras (fourth round)
9. (Russia) Marat Safin (final)
10. (Croatia) Goran Ivanišević (second round)
11. (Switzerland) Roger Federer (fourth round)
12. (Argentina) Guillermo Cañas (third round)
13. (United States) Andy Roddick (second round)
14. (Spain) Àlex Corretja (first round)
15. (France) Arnaud Clément (second round)
16. (Sweden) Thomas Johansson (champion)

17. (Spain) Carlos Moyá (second round)
18. (Spain) Albert Portas (second round)
19. (United States) Jan-Michael Gambill (first round)
20. (France) Fabrice Santoro (first round)
21. (Morocco) Younes El Aynaoui (third round)
22. (Morocco) Hicham Arazi (second round)
23. (Ecuador) Nicolás Lapentti (fourth round)
24. (Sweden) Thomas Enqvist (second round)
25. (Romania) Andrei Pavel (third round)
26. (Czech Republic) Jiří Novák (semifinals)
27. (Netherlands) Sjeng Schalken (first round)
28. (United Kingdom) Greg Rusedski (third round)
29. (Belgium) Xavier Malisse (second round)
30. (France) Nicolas Escudé (third round)
31. (Sweden) Andreas Vinciguerra (second round)
32. (Spain) Tommy Robredo (second round)

Click on the seed number of a player to go to their draw section.

== Draw ==
Key

- Q = Qualifier
- WC = Wild card
- LL = Lucky loser
- Alt = Alternate
- ITF = ITF entry
- PR = Protected ranking
- SR = Special ranking
- SE = Special exempt
- JE = Junior exempt
- JR = Junior Accelerator Programme entrant
- CO = College Accelerator Programme entrant
- NG = Next Gen Accelerator Program entrant
- w/o = Walkover
- r = Retired
- d = Defaulted

=== Finals ===
Quarterfinals
(Chile) Marcelo Ríos	6^{2}	4	7^{7}	6^{5}
7	(Germany) Tommy Haas	7^{7}	6	6^{2}	7^{7}
(South Africa) Wayne Ferreira	2^{r}
9	(Russia) Marat Safin	5
26	(Czech Republic) Jiří Novák	6	6	6
(Austria) Stefan Koubek	2	3	2
(Sweden) Jonas Björkman	0	6	3	4
16	(Sweden) Thomas Johansson	6	2	6	6

Semifinals
7	(Germany) Tommy Haas	7^{7}	6^{4}	6	0	2
9	(Russia) Marat Safin	6^{5}	7^{7}	3	6	6
26	(Czech Republic) Jiří Novák	6^{5}	6	6	3	4
16	(Sweden) Thomas Johansson	7^{7}	0	4	6	6

Final
9	(Russia) Marat Safin	6	4	4	6^{4}
16	(Sweden) Thomas Johansson	3	6	6	7^{7}

=== Top half ===
==== Section 1 ====
First round
1	(Australia) L Hewitt	6	1	4	6^{4}
(Spain) A Martín	1	6	6	7^{7}
(Brazil) F Meligeni	4	1	2
(Switzerland) M Kratochvil	6	6	6
(Chile) M Ríos	6	6	5	6
WC	(Australia) J Crabb	2	0	7	4
(Slovakia) K Kučera	6	6	1	6
27	(Netherlands) S Schalken	1	4	6	1
23	(Ecuador) N Lapentti	7	4	6	6
(Germany) A Pretzsch	5	6	0	0
(Argentina) J Acasuso	3	1	6	7^{7}	6
(Czech Republic) J Vacek	6	6	4	6^{5}	1
(Argentina) G Gaudio	6	7^{7}	7
Q	(United States) J Brasington	4	6^{3}	5
(Brazil) F Saretta	4	6^{5}	4
15	(France) A Clément	6	7^{7}	6

Second round
(Spain) A Martín	3	6	6	6
(Switzerland) M Kratochvil	6	3	3	3
(Chile) M Ríos	7^{7}	7	6
(Slovakia) K Kučera	6^{5}	5	2
23	(Ecuador) N Lapentti	7^{7}	6	6
(Argentina) J Acasuso	6^{5}	2	3
(Argentina) G Gaudio	6	4	6	7^{7}
15	(France) A Clément	4	6	2	6^{3}

Third round
(Spain) A Martín	4	3	6^{3}
(Chile) M Ríos	6	6	7^{7}
23	(Ecuador) N Lapentti	4	5	6	6	6
(Argentina) G Gaudio	6	7	4	2	4

Fourth round
(Chile) M Ríos	7	6	6
23	(Ecuador) N Lapentti	5	1	4

==== Section 2 ====
First round
11	(Switzerland) R Federer	6	6	6
(United States) M Chang	4	4	3
Q	(France) O Patience	3	6	3	6	4
(Hungary) A Sávolt	6	3	6	3	6
WC	(France) P-H Mathieu	6	1	6	1	4
(Germany) R Schüttler	2	6	4	6	6
(Argentina) A Calleri	6	7^{7}	4	6^{4}	1^{r}
17	(Spain) C Moyá	2	6^{3}	6	7^{7}	0
29	(Belgium) X Malisse	6	6	7
Q	(Germany) T Behrend	4	4	5
(Brazil) A Sá	4	3	5
(United States) T Martin	6	6	7
Q	(Italy) S Galvani	2	5	5
Q	(France) J-F Bachelot	6	7	7
(Russia) A Stoliarov	1	3	1
7	(Germany) T Haas	6	6	6

Second round
11	(Switzerland) R Federer	6	7	6
(Hungary) A Sávolt	2	5	4
(Germany) R Schüttler	3	6^{4}	6	7^{7}	6
17	(Spain) C Moyá	6	7^{7}	1	6^{5}	2
29	(Belgium) X Malisse	3	2	2
(United States) T Martin	6	6	6
Q	(France) J-F Bachelot	1	2	3
7	(Germany) T Haas	6	6	6

Third round
11	(Switzerland) R Federer	7^{8}	7^{7}	6
(Germany) R Schüttler	6^{6}	6^{5}	4
(United States) T Martin	7^{10}	3	6	4	1
7	(Germany) T Haas	6^{8}	6	3	6	6

Fourth round
11	(Switzerland) R Federer	6^{3}	6	6	4	6
7	(Germany) T Haas	7^{7}	4	3	6	8

==== Section 3 ====
First round
LL	(Georgia (country)) I Labadze	6	6	3	3	5
Q	(Zimbabwe) B Black	4	4	6	6	7
(Spain) F Mantilla	6	2	3	4
(Spain) A Costa	2	6	6	6
(Czech Republic) O Fukárek	6	5	2	7^{7}	5
(Brazil) A Simoni	4	7	6	6^{3}	7
(Argentina) F Squillari	4	3	6	2
25	(Romania) A Pavel	6	6	3	6
19	(United States) J-M Gambill	2	4	6^{6}
(South Africa) W Ferreira	6	6	7^{8}
(Argentina) D Nalbandian	7^{7}	3	6	6
(Czech Republic) D Vacek	6^{0}	6	3	3
(Croatia) I Ljubičić	6^{4}	1	6	7^{9}	9
(Czech Republic) B Ulihrach	7^{7}	6	4	6^{7}	7
(Argentina) M Zabaleta	3	7	3	3
13	(United States) A Roddick	6	5	6	6

Second round
Q	(Zimbabwe) B Black	1	4	4
(Spain) A Costa	6	6	6
(Brazil) A Simoni	1	0^{r}
25	(Romania) A Pavel	6	4
(South Africa) W Ferreira	6^{5}	7^{7}	7	6
(Argentina) D Nalbandian	7^{7}	6^{2}	5	3
(Croatia) I Ljubičić	7^{13}	3
13	(United States) A Roddick	6^{11}	2^{r}

Third round
(Spain) A Costa	7^{7}	6	6
25	(Romania) A Pavel	6^{4}	4	4
(South Africa) W Ferreira	4	4	7^{7}	6	7
(Croatia) I Ljubičić	6	6	6^{3}	3	5

Fourth round
(Spain) A Costa	6	4	4	7^{7}	7
(South Africa) W Ferreira	4	6	6	6^{4}	9

==== Section 4 ====
First round
9	(Russia) M Safin	7	6	6
(France) A Dupuis	5	4	2
Q	(Netherlands) R Sluiter	6	3	4	2
(Belgium) C Rochus	4	6	6	6
(Russia) M Youzhny	6^{2}	6	6	6
(France) M Llodra	7^{7}	2	2	3
Q	(United States) M Fish	6	1	6	6
20	(France) F Santoro	2	6	4	1
30	(France) N Escudé	1	6	6	6
WC	(Australia) T Reid	6	1	4	4
Q	(Belgium) O Rochus	3	6	3	6	3
(Spain) Á Calatrava	6	3	6	3	6
(Argentina) JI Chela	6	6^{5}	6	6
Q	(Israel) N Okun	2	7^{7}	3	1
(Finland) J Nieminen	3	3	4
8	(United States) P Sampras	6	6	6

Second round
9	(Russia) M Safin	6	7^{8}	6
(Belgium) C Rochus	2	6^{6}	1
(Russia) M Youzhny	6	6	6
Q	(United States) M Fish	4	3	2
30	(France) N Escudé	2	2	6	7	6
(Spain) Á Calatrava	6	6	4	5	4
(Argentina) JI Chela	3	5	6	4
8	(United States) P Sampras	6	7	3	6

Third round
9	(Russia) M Safin	6	6	6
(Russia) M Youzhny	4	4	4
30	(France) N Escudé	6^{5}	7	4	7^{8}	3
8	(United States) P Sampras	7^{7}	5	6	6^{6}	6

Fourth round
9	(Russia) M Safin	6	6	6^{5}	7^{10}
8	(United States) P Sampras	2	4	7^{7}	6^{8}

=== Bottom half ===
==== Section 5 ====
First round
5	(France) S Grosjean	6	2	7^{7}	7^{7}
(Spain) J Balcells	2	6	6^{5}	6^{2}
(United Kingdom) M Lee	6^{2}	1	0
(Spain) F Clavet	7^{7}	6	6
(Italy) A Gaudenzi	1	6	7	6
WC	(Australia) R Fromberg	6	0	5	3
(Germany) N Kiefer	1	0	4
26	(Czech Republic) J Novák	6	6	6
18	(Spain) A Portas	6^{3}	7^{8}	6	6
(Australia) A Ilie	7^{7}	6^{6}	2	0
(Germany) L Burgsmüller	6	6	3	3	5
(Slovakia) D Hrbatý	3	2	6	6	7
(France) J Golmard	7^{7}	7	7^{7}
(Australia) W Arthurs	6^{4}	5	6^{5}
(Czech Republic) M Damm	6	5	6^{4}	4
10	(Croatia) G Ivanišević	4	7	7^{7}	6

Second round
5	(France) S Grosjean	4	6	0	7	4
(Spain) F Clavet	6	3	6	5	6
(Italy) A Gaudenzi	6	7	2	3	3
26	(Czech Republic) J Novák	2	5	6	6	6
18	(Spain) A Portas	1	3	0
(Slovakia) D Hrbatý	6	6	6
(France) J Golmard	6	7^{7}	5	6
10	(Croatia) G Ivanišević	3	6^{2}	7	4

Third round
(Spain) F Clavet	3	4	1
26	(Czech Republic) J Novák	6	6	6
(Slovakia) D Hrbatý	6	6	6^{6}	7
(France) J Golmard	3	1	7^{8}	5

Fourth round
26	(Czech Republic) J Novák	6	6	5	6
(Slovakia) D Hrbatý	4	2	7	2

==== Section 6 ====
First round
14	(Spain) À Corretja	7	6^{6}	3	2
(United States) J Blake	5	7^{8}	6	6
Q	(France) C Saulnier	6	6	6^{6}	4	6
(Austria) S Koubek	0	1	7^{8}	6	8
(Belarus) M Mirnyi	6	3	4	3
(Denmark) K Pless	3	6	6	6
(Switzerland) I Heuberger	4	2	6	6^{1}
22	(Morocco) H Arazi	6	6	4	7^{7}
32	(Spain) T Robredo	6^{5}	6	6	6
(United States) M Russell	7^{7}	3	3	4
(Armenia) S Sargsian	1	3	6^{5}
Q	(Chile) F González	6	6	7^{7}
Q	(United States) A Kim	3	6	6	6
(Italy) D Sanguinetti	6	2	3	4
Q	(Germany) M Kohlmann	3	3	2
4	(Russia) Y Kafelnikov	6	6	6

Second round
(United States) J Blake	6	6	4	1	2
(Austria) S Koubek	4	2	6	6	6
(Denmark) K Pless	6	6	6
22	(Morocco) H Arazi	3	4	1
32	(Spain) T Robredo	2	4	4
Q	(Chile) F González	6	6	6
Q	(United States) A Kim	6	7	6
4	(Russia) Y Kafelnikov	3	5	3

Third round
(Austria) S Koubek	7^{7}	7	6
(Denmark) K Pless	6^{4}	5	3
Q	(Chile) F González	6	6	6
Q	(United States) A Kim	2	2	3

Fourth round
(Austria) S Koubek	7	6	6^{3}	6
Q	(Chile) F González	5	1	7^{7}	2

==== Section 7 ====
First round
6	(United Kingdom) T Henman	7	6	6
WC	(Australia) T Larkham	5	2	2
(Belarus) V Voltchkov	3	6	6	6
Q	(Philippines) C Mamiit	6	3	3	3
(Australia) M Philippoussis	6	6	7
(Spain) G Blanco	3	4	5
WC	(Australia) S Draper	6^{8}	3	5
28	(United Kingdom) G Rusedski	7^{10}	6	7
24	(Sweden) T Enqvist	2	6	6	6
Q	(France) N Thomann	6	3	1	2
(Chile) N Massú	4	0^{r}
(Sweden) J Björkman	6	0
(Paraguay) R Delgado	7	6^{5}	4	6	6
(Spain) A Montañés	5	7^{7}	6	4	1
WC	(Thailand) P Srichaphan	1	1	4
12	(Argentina) G Cañas	6	6	6

Second round
6	(United Kingdom) T Henman	6	6	6
(Belarus) V Voltchkov	3	4	1
(Australia) M Philippoussis	6^{7}	3	4
28	(United Kingdom) G Rusedski	7^{9}	6	6
24	(Sweden) T Enqvist	6	5	4	2
(Sweden) J Björkman	3	7	6	6
(Paraguay) R Delgado	2	5	7^{11}	4
12	(Argentina) G Cañas	6	7	6^{9}	6

Third round
6	(United Kingdom) T Henman	6	6	1	6
28	(United Kingdom) G Rusedski	4	3	6	3
(Sweden) J Björkman	6	6	6
12	(Argentina) G Cañas	3	2	4

Fourth round
6	(United Kingdom) T Henman	2	6^{6}	4
(Sweden) J Björkman	6	7^{8}	6

==== Section 8 ====
First round
16	(Sweden) T Johansson	6	3	7^{7}	6
(Spain) J Díaz	1	6	6^{2}	4
(Russia) N Davydenko	1	4	6	4
(Austria) M Hipfl	6	6	3	6
PR	(Denmark) K Carlsen	6	6	4	4	8
(Spain) F Vicente	2	2	6	6	10
(Czech Republic) J Vaněk	3	3	3
21	(Morocco) Y El Aynaoui	6	6	6
31	(Sweden) A Vinciguerra	6	6	7^{7}
(Italy) F Luzzi	2	2	6^{3}
WC	(United States) T Dent	6	6	6
(Czech Republic) M Tabara	2	1	2
(Romania) A Voinea	5	6	7^{7}	6
(Spain) D Sánchez	7	2	6^{5}	2
(France) J Boutter	3	4	7	6	6
2	(Brazil) G Kuerten	6	6	5	3	3

Second round
16	(Sweden) T Johansson	6	6	6
(Austria) M Hipfl	4	1	4
(Spain) F Vicente	6	3	3	3
21	(Morocco) Y El Aynaoui	4	6	6	6
31	(Sweden) A Vinciguerra	3	4	2
WC	(United States) T Dent	6	6	6
(Romania) A Voinea	6	6	6^{5}	2	6
(France) J Boutter	2	4	7^{7}	6	3

Third round
16	(Sweden) T Johansson	5	6	6	6
21	(Morocco) Y El Aynaoui	7	2	2	4
WC	(United States) T Dent	6	3	4	6	3
(Romania) A Voinea	3	6	6	3	6

Fourth round
16	(Sweden) T Johansson	6^{8}	6	6	6
(Romania) A Voinea	7^{10}	2	0	4

Preceded by 2001 US Open – Men's singles	Grand Slam men's singles	Succeeded by 2002 French Open – Men's singles
