= 2002 French Open – Mixed doubles =

Mixed doubles
- 2002 French Open

Final
- Champions: (Zimbabwe) Cara Black (Zimbabwe) Wayne Black
- Runners-up: (Russia) Elena Bovina (The Bahamas) Mark Knowles
- Score: 6–3, 6–3

Details
- Draw: 32
- Seeds: 8

Events
Singles	men	women		boys	girls
Doubles	men	women	mixed	boys	girls
WC Singles	men	women	quad
WC Doubles	men	women	quad
Legends	−45	45+	women
- French Open

Virginia Ruano Pascual and Tomás Carbonell were the defending champions, but had different outcomes. Ruano Pascual teamed up with Gastón Etlis and lost in second round to Cara and Wayne Black, while Carbonell did not compete this year due to retiring from professional tennis in 2001.

Cara Black and Wayne Black won the title by defeating Elena Bovina and Mark Knowles 6–3, 6–3 in the final. It was the 1st Grand Slam mixed doubles title for both Cara and Wayne in their respective careers. They became the first Zimbabwean pair to win a Grand Slam title

== Seeds ==
1. (Spain) Arantxa Sánchez Vicario / (United States) Jared Palmer (semifinals)
2. (United States) Kimberly Po-Messerli / (United States) Donald Johnson (first round)
3. (Russia) Elena Likhovtseva / (India) Mahesh Bhupathi (quarterfinals)
4. (United States) Lisa Raymond / (India) Leander Paes (second round)
5. (Zimbabwe) Cara Black / (Zimbabwe) Wayne Black (champions)
6. (Slovakia) Daniela Hantuchová / (Zimbabwe) Kevin Ullyett (quarterfinals)
7. (Australia) Rennae Stubbs / (Australia) Todd Woodbridge (first round)
8. Withdrew

== Draw ==
Key

- Q = Qualifier
- WC = Wild card
- LL = Lucky loser
- Alt = Alternate
- ITF = ITF entry
- PR = Protected ranking
- SR = Special ranking
- SE = Special exempt
- JE = Junior exempt
- JR = Junior Accelerator Programme entrant
- CO = College Accelerator Programme entrant
- NG = Next Gen Accelerator Program entrant
- w/o = Walkover
- r = Retired
- d = Defaulted

=== Finals ===
Semifinals
1	(Spain) Arantxa Sánchez Vicario (United States) Jared Palmer	3	3
(Russia) Elena Bovina (The Bahamas) Mark Knowles	6	6
5	(Zimbabwe) Cara Black (Zimbabwe) Wayne Black	3	6	6
(Slovenia) Katarina Srebotnik (United States) Bob Bryan	6	3	4

Final
(Russia) Elena Bovina (The Bahamas) Mark Knowles	3	3
5	(Zimbabwe) Cara Black (Zimbabwe) Wayne Black	6	6

=== Top half ===
First round
1	(Spain) A Sánchez Vicario (United States) J Palmer	6	2	6
WC	(France) É Loit (France) N Coutelot	2	6	4
WC	(United States) J Capriati (United States) S Capriati	3	1
WC	(France) A Fusai (France) J Varlet	6	6
WC	(France) T Golovin (France) A Dupuis	6	5	2
(Italy) R Vinci (Czech Republic) P Vízner	3	7	6
(Australia) N Pratt (Australia) S Stolle	6	6
Alt	(United States) N Arendt (South Africa) D Adams	3	2
4	(United States) L Raymond (India) L Paes	6	6^{7}	6
(Argentina) P Suárez (Argentina) L Arnold Ker	4	7^{9}	4
(Slovenia) T Križan (United States) R Leach	5	6	4
(Russia) E Bovina (The Bahamas) M Knowles	7	2	6
(Austria) B Schett (Australia) J Eagle	6^{3}	6	6
(Argentina) P Tarabini (United States) B MacPhie	7^{7}	1	1
(Uzbekistan) I Tulyaganova (Czech Republic) M Damm	4	1
6	(Slovakia) D Hantuchová (Zimbabwe) K Ullyett	6	6

Second round
1	(Spain) A Sánchez Vicario (United States) J Palmer	6	6
WC	(France) A Fusai (France) J Varlet	2	0
(Italy) R Vinci (Czech Republic) P Vízner	6	7
(Australia) N Pratt (Australia) S Stolle	2	5
4	(United States) L Raymond (India) L Paes	3	6^{2}
(Russia) E Bovina (The Bahamas) M Knowles	6	7^{7}
(Austria) B Schett (Australia) J Eagle	6^{8}	7^{7}	1
6	(Slovakia) D Hantuchová (Zimbabwe) K Ullyett	7^{10}	6^{5}	6

Quarterfinals
1	(Spain) A Sánchez Vicario (United States) J Palmer	6	6
(Italy) R Vinci (Czech Republic) P Vízner	2	1
(Russia) E Bovina (The Bahamas) M Knowles	5	7^{7}	6
6	(Slovakia) D Hantuchová (Zimbabwe) K Ullyett	7	6^{5}	3

Semifinals
1	(Spain) A Sánchez Vicario (United States) J Palmer	3	3
(Russia) E Bovina (The Bahamas) M Knowles	6	6

=== Bottom half ===
First round
5	(Zimbabwe) C Black (Zimbabwe) W Black	7^{7}	5	6
(Germany) B Rittner (Czech Republic) P Pála	6^{2}	7	2
(Spain) V Ruano Pascual (Argentina) G Etlis	3	6	6
(South Africa) L Huber (United States) M Bryan	6	3	4
WC	(France) C Dhenin (France) S Huet	3	6	3
WC	(France) C Pin (France) A Clément	6	3	6
(Indonesia) W Prakusya (Czech Republic) C Suk	1	7	3
3	(Russia) E Likhovtseva (India) M Bhupathi	6	5	6
7	(Australia) R Stubbs (Australia) T Woodbridge	6^{8}	5
(Slovenia) K Srebotnik (United States) B Bryan	7^{10}	7
(Belgium) E Callens (South Africa) E Ferreira	1	0
WC	(France) N Dechy (France) M Llodra	6	6
(France) S Testud (United States) J Tarango	6	4	6
WC	(France) N Tauziat (Iran) M Bahrami	2	6	3
(Netherlands) C Vis (Australia) M Hill	7	5	6
2	(United States) K Po-Messerli (United States) D Johnson	5	7	4

Second round
5	(Zimbabwe) C Black (Zimbabwe) W Black	6^{3}	6	6
(Spain) V Ruano Pascual (Argentina) G Etlis	7^{7}	4	4
WC	(France) C Pin (France) A Clément	4	6	2
3	(Russia) E Likhovtseva (India) M Bhupathi	6	4	6
(Slovenia) K Srebotnik (United States) B Bryan	7	6
WC	(France) N Dechy (France) M Llodra	5	2
(France) S Testud (United States) J Tarango	2	6	1
(Netherlands) C Vis (Australia) M Hill	6	1	6

Quarterfinals
5	(Zimbabwe) C Black (Zimbabwe) W Black	5	6	6
3	(Russia) E Likhovtseva (India) M Bhupathi	7	3	4
(Slovenia) K Srebotnik (United States) B Bryan	6	6
(Netherlands) C Vis (Australia) M Hill	2	3

Semifinals
5	(Zimbabwe) C Black (Zimbabwe) W Black	3	6	6
(Slovenia) K Srebotnik (United States) B Bryan	6	3	4
