= 2002 French Open – Women's singles =

Women's singles
- 2002 French Open

Final
- Champion: (United States) Serena Williams
- Runner-up: (United States) Venus Williams
- Score: 7–5, 6–3

Details
- Seeds: 32

Events
Singles	men	women		boys	girls
Doubles	men	women	mixed	boys	girls
WC Singles	men	women	quad
WC Doubles	men	women	quad
Legends	−45	45+	women
← 2001 ·	French Open	· 2003 →

Serena Williams defeated her sister Venus Williams in the final, 7–5, 6–3 to win the women's singles tennis title at the 2002 French Open. It was her first French Open title, second major singles title overall, and her first step towards completing her first "Serena Slam", a non-calendar year Grand Slam.

Jennifer Capriati was the defending champion, but lost to Serena Williams in the semifinals.

== Seeds ==
1. (United States) Jennifer Capriati (semifinals)
2. (United States) Venus Williams (final)
3. (United States) Serena Williams (champion)
4. (Belgium) Kim Clijsters (third round)
5. (Belgium) Justine Henin (first round)
6. (United States) Monica Seles (quarterfinals)
7. (Federal Republic of Yugoslavia) Jelena Dokić (quarterfinals)
8. (France) Sandrine Testud (first round)
9. (Italy) Silvia Farina Elia (fourth round)
10. (France) Amélie Mauresmo (fourth round)
11. (Slovakia) Daniela Hantuchová (fourth round)
12. (United States) Meghann Shaughnessy (first round)
13. (Russia) Elena Dementieva (fourth round)
14. (Uzbekistan) Iroda Tulyaganova (third round)
15. (Spain) Arantxa Sánchez Vicario (first round)
16. (Austria) Barbara Schett (second round)
17. (Thailand) Tamarine Tanasugarn (third round)
18. (Russia) Tatiana Panova (third round)
19. (Russia) Anastasia Myskina (first round)
20. (Switzerland) Patty Schnyder (fourth round)
21. (Israel) Anna Smashnova (first round)
22. (Bulgaria) Magdalena Maleeva (first round)
23. (Luxembourg) Anne Kremer (third round)
24. (United States) Lisa Raymond (first round)
25. (Czech Republic) Dája Bedáňová (first round)
26. (Japan) Ai Sugiyama (second round)
27. (France) Nathalie Dechy (third round)
28. (United States) Alexandra Stevenson (first round)
29. (Croatia) Iva Majoli (second round)
30. (South Africa) Amanda Coetzer (first round)
31. (Italy) Rita Grande (third round)
32. (Spain) Cristina Torrens Valero (second round)

== Draw ==
=== Key ===
- Q = Qualifier
- WC = Wild card
- LL = Lucky loser
- Alt = Alternate
- ITF = ITF entry
- PR = Protected ranking
- SR = Special ranking
- SE = Special exempt
- JE = Junior exempt
- JR = Junior Accelerator Programme entrant
- CO = College Accelerator Programme entrant
- NG = Next Gen Accelerator Program entrant
- w/o = Walkover
- r = Retired
- d = Defaulted

=== Finals ===
Quarterfinals
1	(United States) Jennifer Capriati	6	4	6
7	(Federal Republic of Yugoslavia) Jelena Dokić	4	6	1
3	(United States) Serena Williams	6	6
WC	(France) Mary Pierce	1	1
(Argentina) Paola Suárez	6	6^{5}	1
(Argentina) Clarisa Fernández	2	7^{7}	6
6	(United States) Monica Seles	4	3
2	(United States) Venus Williams	6	6

Semifinals
1	(United States) Jennifer Capriati	6	6^{2}	2
3	(United States) Serena Williams	3	7^{7}	6
(Argentina) Clarisa Fernández	1	4
2	(United States) Venus Williams	6	6

Final
3	(United States) Serena Williams	7	6
2	(United States) Venus Williams	5	3

=== Top half ===
==== Section 1 ====
First round
1	(United States) J Capriati	6	6
(United States) M Irvin	3	4
(United States) A Frazier	6	6
(United States) M Tu	4	0
(Indonesia) A Widjaja	2	7	6
(United States) J Craybas	6	5	1
(Australia) E Dominikovic	6	6
28	(United States) A Stevenson	3	2
20	(Switzerland) P Schnyder	6	6
Q	(Venezuela) M Sequera	3	2
(Italy) T Garbin	7^{7}	6
(Croatia) S Talaja	6^{5}	4
(Russia) A Kournikova	4	3
WC	(Australia) C Wheeler	6	6
(Denmark) E Dyrberg	6^{8}	3
14	(Uzbekistan) I Tulyaganova	7^{10}	6

Second round
1	(United States) J Capriati	6	6
(United States) A Frazier	4	3
(Indonesia) A Widjaja	6^{4}	4
(Australia) E Dominikovic	7^{7}	6
20	(Switzerland) P Schnyder	6	6
(Italy) T Garbin	3	2
WC	(Australia) C Wheeler	1	4
14	(Uzbekistan) I Tulyaganova	6	6

Third round
1	(United States) J Capriati	6	6
(Australia) E Dominikovic	3	1
20	(Switzerland) P Schnyder	7	7^{8}
14	(Uzbekistan) I Tulyaganova	5	6^{6}

Fourth round
1	(United States) J Capriati	6	6
20	(Switzerland) P Schnyder	4	4

==== Section 2 ====
First round
12	(United States) M Shaughnessy	6^{8}	3
Q	(Spain) C Martínez Granados	7^{10}	6
(Slovenia) K Srebotnik	6	6
(Spain) G León García	3	4
(France) É Loit	6	3	7
(Australia) A Molik	2	6	5
Q	(Japan) S Asagoe	3	6	7
19	(Russia) A Myskina	6	2	5
30	(South Africa) A Coetzer	2	2
(Germany) M Müller	6	6
PR	(Colombia) F Zuluaga	2	4
(Russia) E Likhovtseva	6	6
(Spain) C Martínez	6	6
(Italy) ME Camerin	3	3
(Switzerland) E Gagliardi	4	2
7	(Federal Republic of Yugoslavia) J Dokić	6	6

Second round
Q	(Spain) C Martínez Granados	1	0
(Slovenia) K Srebotnik	6	6
(France) É Loit	2	7^{7}	6
Q	(Japan) S Asagoe	6	6^{3}	2
(Germany) M Müller	5	4
(Russia) E Likhovtseva	7	6
(Spain) C Martínez	6	6^{7}	2
7	(Federal Republic of Yugoslavia) J Dokić	3	7^{9}	6

Third round
(Slovenia) K Srebotnik	6	6
(France) É Loit	0	1
(Russia) E Likhovtseva	2	3
7	(Federal Republic of Yugoslavia) J Dokić	6	6

Fourth round
(Slovenia) K Srebotnik	6^{3}	2
7	(Federal Republic of Yugoslavia) J Dokić	7^{7}	6

==== Section 3 ====
First round
3	(United States) S Williams	6	6
(Slovakia) M Suchá	3	0
(Netherlands) M Oremans	0	3
Q	(Madagascar) D Randriantefy	6	6
(Slovakia) J Husárová	6	3	7
WC	(France) A Fusai	2	6	5
WC	(France) M Bartoli	3	6	5
26	(Japan) A Sugiyama	6	4	7
21	(Israel) A Smashnova	4	2
(Italy) F Schiavone	6	6
Q	(Hungary) R Kuti-Kis	6	1	0
(Switzerland) M-G Mikaelian	4	6	6
(Slovenia) M Matevžič	4	6^{7}
Q	(Russia) V Zvonareva	6	7^{9}
(Spain) M Marrero	6	6
15	(Spain) A Sánchez Vicario	0	1

Second round
3	(United States) S Williams	6	6
Q	(Madagascar) D Randriantefy	2	3
(Slovakia) J Husárová	6	1	6
26	(Japan) A Sugiyama	2	6	2
(Italy) F Schiavone	3	7^{7}	6
(Switzerland) M-G Mikaelian	6	6^{4}	3
Q	(Russia) V Zvonareva	6	6
(Spain) M Marrero	2	1

Third round
3	(United States) S Williams	6	6
(Slovakia) J Husárová	1	3
(Italy) F Schiavone	2	7^{7}	5
Q	(Russia) V Zvonareva	6	6^{4}	7

Fourth round
3	(United States) S Williams	4	6	6
Q	(Russia) V Zvonareva	6	0	1

==== Section 4 ====
First round
9	(Italy) S Farina Elia	3	6	6
(Russia) E Bovina	6	2	4
(Slovenia) T Pisnik	2	6	6
(Czech Republic) K Hrdličková	6	3	4
WC	(France) L Andretto	3	0
(Germany) J Kandarr	6	6
(Czech Republic) D Chládková	3	2
17	(Thailand) T Tanasugarn	6	6
32	(Spain) C Torrens Valero	6	6
PR	(Poland) M Grzybowska	2	1
WC	(France) M Pierce	7	7
(Kazakhstan) I Selyutina	5	5
(Slovakia) H Nagyová	3	6	4
(France) V Razzano	6	1	6
Q	(Hungary) A Kapros	4	6	6
5	(Belgium) J Henin	6	1	0

Second round
9	(Italy) S Farina Elia	7^{8}	6
(Slovenia) T Pisnik	6^{6}	4
(Germany) J Kandarr	4	6	3
17	(Thailand) T Tanasugarn	6	1	6
32	(Spain) C Torrens Valero	3	1
WC	(France) M Pierce	6	6
(France) V Razzano	7^{7}	6^{1}	2
Q	(Hungary) A Kapros	6^{3}	7^{7}	6

Third round
9	(Italy) S Farina Elia	6	7^{7}
17	(Thailand) T Tanasugarn	0	6^{1}
WC	(France) M Pierce	6	6
Q	(Hungary) A Kapros	3	0

Fourth round
9	(Italy) S Farina Elia	1	2
WC	(France) M Pierce	6	6

=== Bottom half ===
==== Section 5 ====
First round
8	(France) S Testud	6	5	1
(Argentina) P Suárez	2	7	6
Q	(Russia) M Goloviznina	2	7	5
(Austria) B Schwartz	6	5	2^{r}
(United States) J Hopkins	6^{3}	4
Q	(Czech Republic) I Benešová	7^{7}	6
Q	(Spain) N Llagostera Vives	1	6	0
27	(France) N Dechy	6	3	6
24	(United States) L Raymond	4	3
(Spain) E Bes	6	6
(Spain) V Ruano Pascual	6	6
(France) S Foretz	2	4
(Australia) N Pratt	2	7	6
(Spain) M Serna	6	5	1
WC	(France) C Pin	4	1
10	(France) A Mauresmo	6	6

Second round
(Argentina) P Suárez	6	6
Q	(Russia) M Goloviznina	4	4
Q	(Czech Republic) I Benešová	6	1	4
27	(France) N Dechy	4	6	6
(Spain) E Bes	6	1	6
(Spain) V Ruano Pascual	3	6	0
(Australia) N Pratt	2	1
10	(France) A Mauresmo	6	6

Third round
(Argentina) P Suárez	6	4	7
27	(France) N Dechy	4	6	5
(Spain) E Bes	1	1
10	(France) A Mauresmo	6	6

Fourth round
(Argentina) P Suárez	6	2	6
10	(France) A Mauresmo	2	6	4

==== Section 6 ====
First round
13	(Russia) E Dementieva	7	6
(Czech Republic) A Gerši	5	3
(Tunisia) S Sfar	0	2
(Sweden) Å Svensson	6	6
(Paraguay) R Neffa-de los Ríos	6	6
(Germany) G Arn	3	4
WC	(France) A-G Sidot	6	6
22	(Bulgaria) M Maleeva	2	4
25	(Czech Republic) D Bedáňová	6	3	2
(Croatia) J Kostanić	2	6	6
Q	(Bulgaria) L Bacheva	5	1
(Argentina) C Fernández	7	6
(Greece) E Daniilidou	6	6
(France) C Beigbeder	3	1
(Belarus) T Poutchek	6	3	6
4	(Belgium) K Clijsters	3	6	8

Second round
13	(Russia) E Dementieva	7	6
(Sweden) Å Svensson	5	3
(Paraguay) R Neffa-de los Ríos	6	6
WC	(France) A-G Sidot	3	1
(Croatia) J Kostanić	3	4
(Argentina) C Fernández	6	6
(Greece) E Daniilidou	6^{4}	6^{7}
4	(Belgium) K Clijsters	7^{7}	7^{9}

Third round
13	(Russia) E Dementieva	6	6
(Paraguay) R Neffa-de los Ríos	3	0
(Argentina) C Fernández	6	6
4	(Belgium) K Clijsters	4	0

Fourth round
13	(Russia) E Dementieva	6	2	3
(Argentina) C Fernández	3	6	6

==== Section 7 ====
First round
6	(United States) M Seles	6^{4}	6	6
(Spain) Á Montolio	7^{7}	3	0
(Germany) B Rittner	6	4	6
(Hungary) P Mandula	3	6	0
(United States) L Osterloh	4	4
(Slovakia) Ľ Cervanová	6	6
(United States) K Brandi	4	3
29	(Croatia) I Majoli	6	6
18	(Russia) T Panova	6	4	6
(Netherlands) S Noorlander	1	6	2
Q	(Croatia) M Lučić	6	6
WC	(France) S Cohen-Aloro	3	3
(Canada) J Nejedly	1	2
(Italy) A Serra Zanetti	6	6
(Zimbabwe) C Black	2	3
11	(Slovakia) D Hantuchová	6	6

Second round
6	(United States) M Seles	6	6
(Germany) B Rittner	4	1
(Slovakia) Ľ Cervanová	4	6	6
29	(Croatia) I Majoli	6	3	0
18	(Russia) T Panova	6	6
Q	(Croatia) M Lučić	1	1
(Italy) A Serra Zanetti	3	1
11	(Slovakia) D Hantuchová	6	6

Third round
6	(United States) M Seles	6	6
(Slovakia) Ľ Cervanová	2	2
18	(Russia) T Panova	3	1
11	(Slovakia) D Hantuchová	6	6

Fourth round
6	(United States) M Seles	6	7
11	(Slovakia) D Hantuchová	4	5

==== Section 8 ====
First round
16	(Austria) B Schett	6	2	6
(Germany) M Weingärtner	2	6	0
(South Korea) Y-j Cho	3	0
(United States) C Rubin	6	6
(United States) S Reeves	6	6
(Hungary) Z Gubacsi	1	1
(Chinese Taipei) J Lee	1	6^{5}
23	(Luxembourg) A Kremer	6	7^{7}
31	(Italy) R Grande	6	6
(Argentina) M Díaz Oliva	4	4
(Japan) S Obata	6	2	0
(Russia) A Jidkova	0	6	6
(Indonesia) W Prakusya	1	7	6
(Germany) A Barna	6	5	1
(Germany) B Lamade	3	3
2	(United States) V Williams	6	6

Second round
16	(Austria) B Schett	7	3	5
(United States) C Rubin	5	6	7
(United States) S Reeves	6^{3}	1
23	(Luxembourg) A Kremer	7^{7}	6
31	(Italy) R Grande	6	7
(Russia) A Jidkova	0	5
(Indonesia) W Prakusya	0	1
2	(United States) V Williams	6	6

Third round
(United States) C Rubin	6	6
23	(Luxembourg) A Kremer	1	0
31	(Italy) R Grande	1	4
2	(United States) V Williams	6	6

Fourth round
(United States) C Rubin	3	2
2	(United States) V Williams	6	6

Preceded by 2002 Australian Open – Women's singles	Grand Slam women's singles	Succeeded by 2002 Wimbledon Championships – Women's singles
