= 2002 French Open – Men's singles =

Men's singles
- 2002 French Open

Final
- Champion: (Spain) Albert Costa
- Runner-up: (Spain) Juan Carlos Ferrero
- Score: 6–1, 6–0, 4–6, 6–3

Details
- Draw: 128
- Seeds: 32

Events
Singles	men	women		boys	girls
Doubles	men	women	mixed	boys	girls
WC Singles	men	women	quad
WC Doubles	men	women	quad
Legends	−45	45+	women
- French Open

Albert Costa defeated Juan Carlos Ferrero in the final, 6–1, 6–0, 4–6, 6–3 to win the men's singles tennis title at the 2002 French Open. It was his first and only major singles title, as well as his twelfth and last career ATP Tour–level title.

Gustavo Kuerten was the two-time defending champion, but lost in the fourth round to Costa.

At this tournament, Feliciano López began his record run of 79 consecutive major main draw appearances that spanned twenty years, ending at the 2022 Australian Open.

== Seeds ==
1. (Australia) Lleyton Hewitt (fourth round)
2. (Russia) Marat Safin (semifinals)
3. (Germany) Tommy Haas (fourth round)
4. (United States) Andre Agassi (quarterfinals)
5. (Russia) Yevgeny Kafelnikov (second round)
6. (United Kingdom) Tim Henman (second round)
7. (Brazil) Gustavo Kuerten (fourth round)
8. (Switzerland) Roger Federer (first round)
9. (Sweden) Thomas Johansson (second round)
10. (France) Sébastien Grosjean (quarterfinals)
11. (Spain) Juan Carlos Ferrero (final)
12. (United States) Pete Sampras (first round)
13. (United States) Andy Roddick (first round)
14. (Czech Republic) Jiří Novák (third round)
15. (Argentina) Guillermo Cañas (quarterfinals)
16. (Morocco) Younes El Aynaoui (second round)

17. (Spain) Carlos Moyà (third round)
18. (Spain) Àlex Corretja (semifinals)
19. (Sweden) Thomas Enqvist (second round)
20. (Spain) Albert Costa (champion)
21. (Argentina) Juan Ignacio Chela (first round)
22. (Romania) Andrei Pavel (quarterfinals)
23. (France) Fabrice Santoro (second round)
24. (Germany) Rainer Schüttler (second round)
25. (Spain) Tommy Robredo (third round)
26. (Belarus) Max Mirnyi (first round)
27. (France) Nicolas Escudé (first round)
28. (Ecuador) Nicolás Lapentti (first round)
29. (Argentina) David Nalbandian (third round)
30. (Netherlands) Sjeng Schalken (third round)
31. (Argentina) Gastón Gaudio (fourth round)
32. (Croatia) Ivan Ljubičić (first round)

Click on the seed number of a player to go to their draw section.

== Draw ==
Key

- Q = Qualifier
- WC = Wild card
- LL = Lucky loser
- Alt = Alternate
- ITF = ITF entry
- PR = Protected ranking
- SR = Special ranking
- SE = Special exempt
- JE = Junior exempt
- JR = Junior Accelerator Programme entrant
- CO = College Accelerator Programme entrant
- NG = Next Gen Accelerator Program entrant
- w/o = Walkover
- r = Retired
- d = Defaulted

=== Finals ===
Quarterfinals
15	(Argentina) Guillermo Cañas	5	6	7^{7}	4	0
20	(Spain) Albert Costa	7	3	6^{3}	6	6
22	(Romania) Andrei Pavel	6^{5}	5	5
18	(Spain) Àlex Corretja	7^{7}	7	7
11	(Spain) Juan Carlos Ferrero	6	5	7	6
4	(United States) Andre Agassi	3	7	5	3
10	(France) Sébastien Grosjean	3	2	2
2	(Russia) Marat Safin	6	6	6

Semifinals
20	(Spain) Albert Costa	6	6	3	6
18	(Spain) Àlex Corretja	3	4	6	3
11	(Spain) Juan Carlos Ferrero	6	6	6
2	(Russia) Marat Safin	3	2	4

Final
20	(Spain) Albert Costa	6	6	4	6
11	(Spain) Juan Carlos Ferrero	1	0	6	3

=== Top half ===
==== Section 1 ====
First round
1	(Australia) L Hewitt	7	6	7
(Brazil) A Sá	5	4	5
LL	(Russia) A Stoliarov	1	6	6	7
(Sweden) J Björkman	6	4	4	5
WC	(France) S de Chaunac	4	4	6	6	6
(United States) M Chang	6	6	4	2	4
Q	(Peru) I Miranda	6^{2}	0	1
30	(Netherlands) S Schalken	7^{7}	6	6
17	(Spain) C Moyà	6	6	6
(Paraguay) R Delgado	3	3	2
PR	(Australia) M Philippoussis	1	6^{5}	6	7^{7}	6
Q	(France) J Varlet	6	7^{7}	4	6^{3}	3
(Spain) Á Calatrava	6	6	6
(Germany) N Kiefer	3	0	4
(Slovakia) K Kučera	7^{7}	4	2	2
15	(Argentina) G Cañas	6^{3}	6	6	6

Second round
1	(Australia) L Hewitt	4	7^{7}	6	7
LL	(Russia) A Stoliarov	6	6^{5}	0	5
WC	(France) S de Chaunac	0	2	6^{3}
30	(Netherlands) S Schalken	6	6	7^{7}
17	(Spain) C Moyà	6	7^{9}	7^{11}
PR	(Australia) M Philippoussis	2	6^{7}	6^{9}
(Spain) Á Calatrava	6	1	2	0
15	(Argentina) G Cañas	3	6	6	6

Third round
1	(Australia) L Hewitt	6	7	6^{3}	6
30	(Netherlands) S Schalken	1	5	7^{7}	1
17	(Spain) C Moyà	6	6^{1}	7^{7}	1	2
15	(Argentina) G Cañas	4	7^{7}	6^{2}	6	6

Fourth round
1	(Australia) L Hewitt	7^{7}	6^{13}	4	3
15	(Argentina) G Cañas	6^{1}	7^{15}	6	6

==== Section 2 ====
First round
12	(United States) P Sampras	6	4	2	6^{3}
(Italy) A Gaudenzi	3	6	6	7^{7}
(Italy) F Luzzi	2	2	5
Q	(United States) J Brasington	6	6	7
Q	(Italy) G Galimberti	7^{7}	4	1	3
(Russia) N Davydenko	6^{4}	6	6	6
WC	(France) R Gasquet	6	0	4	3
20	(Spain) A Costa	3	6	6	6
27	(France) N Escudé	4	2	6	4
(Brazil) F Meligeni	6	6	0	6
(Chile) F González	6	7^{11}	6
WC	(Australia) S Draper	2	6^{9}	3
(Austria) J Knowle	3	6	5	3
(Italy) D Sanguinetti	6	4	7	6
(Switzerland) I Heuberger	5	2	2
7	(Brazil) G Kuerten	7	6	6

Second round
(Italy) A Gaudenzi	6	7^{7}	6
Q	(United States) J Brasington	3	6^{0}	1
(Russia) N Davydenko	5	6^{4}	2
20	(Spain) A Costa	7	7^{7}	6
(Brazil) F Meligeni	2	6	1	2
(Chile) F González	6	3	6	6
(Italy) D Sanguinetti	7^{7}	2	6	4	3
7	(Brazil) G Kuerten	6^{0}	6	4	6	6

Third round
(Italy) A Gaudenzi	6^{2}	1	5
20	(Spain) A Costa	7^{7}	6	7
(Chile) F González	3	6	6^{6}	4
7	(Brazil) G Kuerten	6	2	7^{8}	6

Fourth round
20	(Spain) A Costa	6	7	6
7	(Brazil) G Kuerten	4	5	4

==== Section 3 ====
First round
3	(Germany) T Haas	6	7	6
(Czech Republic) M Tabara	3	5	4
LL	(Spain) F López	4	6	6	4	6
Q	(Spain) D Pérez	6	4	2	6	4
(Belgium) C Rochus	1	2	7^{7}	2
Q	(Israel) A Hadad	6	6	6^{4}	6
(Finland) J Nieminen	6	6	7^{7}
28	(Ecuador) N Lapentti	3	4	6^{5}
22	(Romania) A Pavel	6	5
(United Kingdom) M Lee	1	4	r
(Switzerland) M Kratochvil	6	6^{6}	6	6
(Slovakia) D Hrbatý	0	7^{8}	3	3
(Spain) Á Montañés	6^{3}	6	3	6	7
(France) A Dupuis	7^{7}	4	6	2	5
(United States) J-M Gambill	6	3	4	6	4
16	(Morocco) Y El Aynaoui	3	6	6	3	6

Second round
3	(Germany) T Haas	6	6	6
LL	(Spain) F López	3	4	4
Q	(Israel) A Hadad	7^{7}	4	4	5
(Finland) J Nieminen	6^{4}	6	6	7
22	(Romania) A Pavel	6	6	6
(Switzerland) M Kratochvil	3	1	3
(Spain) Á Montañés	7	7^{7}	6
16	(Morocco) Y El Aynaoui	5	6^{2}	4

Third round
3	(Germany) T Haas	6	7	2	6
(Finland) J Nieminen	3	5	6	4
22	(Romania) A Pavel	6	1	6	6
(Spain) Á Montañés	1	6	4	3

Fourth round
3	(Germany) T Haas	1	6^{9}	4
22	(Romania) A Pavel	6	7^{11}	6

==== Section 4 ====
First round
9	(Sweden) T Johansson	6	7^{8}	6
(Argentina) F Squillari	2	6^{6}	2
WC	(France) J Benneteau	0	1	4
(France) A Clément	6	6	6
(United States) T Martin	6	7	3	4	7
Q	(Argentina) M Vassallo Argüello	2	5	6	6	5
(Czech Republic) B Ulihrach	1	4	1
18	(Spain) À Corretja	6	6	6
32	(Croatia) I Ljubičić	6	1	6^{7}	6	3
(Spain) F Vicente	4	6	7^{9}	4	6
Q	(United States) R Ginepri	6^{5}	2	3
(Spain) A Martín	7^{7}	6	6
(Czech Republic) J Vacek	1	6	3	4
(Argentina) M Zabaleta	6	3	6	6
Q	(Germany) T Behrend	3	2	6	7^{7}	1
5	(Russia) Y Kafelnikov	6	6	3	6^{3}	6

Second round
9	(Sweden) T Johansson	6^{4}	1	3
(France) A Clément	7^{7}	6	6
(United States) T Martin	2	3	5
18	(Spain) À Corretja	6	6	7
(Spain) F Vicente	6	6	6
(Spain) A Martín	4	3	3
(Argentina) M Zabaleta	7^{7}	2	6	7^{7}
5	(Russia) Y Kafelnikov	6^{4}	6	4	6^{4}

Third round
(France) A Clément	1	2	6	7	6
18	(Spain) À Corretja	6	6	4	5	8
(Spain) F Vicente	6	3	4	3
(Argentina) M Zabaleta	4	6	6	6

Fourth round
18	(Spain) À Corretja	6	6	7
(Argentina) M Zabaleta	3	2	5

=== Bottom half ===
==== Section 5 ====
First round
8	(Switzerland) R Federer	3	2	4
(Morocco) H Arazi	6	6	6
(Denmark) K Pless	3	6	6^{5}	7	3
Q	(Argentina) M Puerta	6	1	7^{7}	5	6
(Georgia (country)) I Labadze	7^{7}	5	6^{6}	6	9
(France) J Boutter	6^{4}	7	7^{8}	3	7
(Spain) J Balcells	4	2	5
31	(Argentina) G Gaudio	6	6	7
24	(Germany) R Schüttler	7^{7}	2	7^{7}	6
LL	(Italy) S Galvani	6^{4}	6	6^{3}	1
(Armenia) S Sargsian	2	5	0
(Argentina) G Coria	6	7	6
(France) N Coutelot	6	6	6
(Austria) S Koubek	4	4	4
WC	(Monaco) J-R Lisnard	1	6^{1}	3
11	(Spain) JC Ferrero	6	7^{7}	6

Second round
(Morocco) H Arazi	6	6	6
Q	(Argentina) M Puerta	2	1	2
(Georgia (country)) I Labadze	1	2	7^{11}	4
31	(Argentina) G Gaudio	6	6	6^{9}	6
24	(Germany) R Schüttler	4	2	3
(Argentina) G Coria	6	6	6
(France) N Coutelot	2	7	6	2	0
11	(Spain) JC Ferrero	6	5	1	6	6

Third round
(Morocco) H Arazi	2	6	4	1	r
31	(Argentina) G Gaudio	6	4	6	3
(Argentina) G Coria	2	3	3
11	(Spain) JC Ferrero	6	6	6

Fourth round
31	(Argentina) G Gaudio	7^{7}	1	7^{7}	2	4
11	(Spain) JC Ferrero	6^{3}	6	6^{5}	6	6

==== Section 6 ====
First round
14	(Czech Republic) J Novák	6	6	7^{7}
(Russia) M Youzhny	3	4	6^{5}
Q	(Germany) J Knippschild	6	1	3	7^{7}	6
(South Korea) H-t Lee	4	6	6	6^{3}	1
WC	(France) P-H Mathieu	6	6^{1}	5	6	6
(South Africa) W Ferreira	4	7^{7}	7	2	0
PR	(Sweden) M Norman	2	7	6	4	4
23	(France) F Santoro	6	5	3	6	6
25	(Spain) T Robredo	6	6	1
(Israel) H Levy	1	0	0	r
Q	(Uzbekistan) O Ogorodov	6^{8}	6	2	7	9
(Austria) M Hipfl	7^{10}	1	6	5	7
(Spain) D Sánchez	6	7	6
(Argentina) J Acasuso	4	5	4
Q	(France) É Prodon	3	3	1
4	(United States) A Agassi	6	6	6

Second round
14	(Czech Republic) J Novák	6	6	7
Q	(Germany) J Knippschild	1	2	5
WC	(France) P-H Mathieu	7	6	1	6
23	(France) F Santoro	5	1	6	4
25	(Spain) T Robredo	6	4	6	6
Q	(Uzbekistan) O Ogorodov	3	6	1	2
(Spain) D Sánchez	6	2	1	r
4	(United States) A Agassi	4	6	6

Third round
14	(Czech Republic) J Novák	4	4	3
WC	(France) P-H Mathieu	6	6	6
25	(Spain) T Robredo	2	4	2
4	(United States) A Agassi	6	6	6

Fourth round
WC	(France) P-H Mathieu	6	6	3	3	3
4	(United States) A Agassi	4	3	6	6	6

==== Section 7 ====
First round
6	(United Kingdom) T Henman	6	6	7^{8}
(Spain) G Blanco	4	3	6^{6}
Q	(Germany) A Popp	4	1	6	1
(Belgium) X Malisse	6	6	4	6
(Australia) A Ilie	6^{4}	3	4
(Spain) A Portas	7^{7}	6	6
(Philippines) C Mamiit	6	6	5	6
26	(Belarus) M Mirnyi	3	4	7	4
21	(Argentina) JI Chela	6^{9}	5	6	6^{7}
(Romania) A Voinea	7^{11}	7	4	7^{9}
(United States) V Spadea	4	6	6	3	6
(France) C Pioline	6	4	4	6	4
(United States) J Blake	6	2
(Germany) L Burgsmüller	2	1	r
(Spain) F Clavet	6^{0}	6^{2}	6	3
10	(France) S Grosjean	7^{7}	7^{7}	3	6

Second round
6	(United Kingdom) T Henman	2	6	6^{4}	3
(Belgium) X Malisse	6	3	7^{7}	6
(Spain) A Portas	3	6	6	6
(Philippines) C Mamiit	6	3	4	4
(Romania) A Voinea	4	6	6	6^{4}	6
(United States) V Spadea	6	4	2	7^{7}	8
(United States) J Blake	4	6	2	5
10	(France) S Grosjean	6	3	6	7

Third round
(Belgium) X Malisse	6	6	7^{7}
(Spain) A Portas	2	3	6^{3}
(United States) V Spadea	2	6^{5}	7^{7}	4
10	(France) S Grosjean	6	7^{7}	6^{5}	6

Fourth round
(Belgium) X Malisse	2	5	3
10	(France) S Grosjean	6	7	6

==== Section 8 ====
First round
13	(United States) A Roddick	6	6^{14}	6	5	3
(Australia) W Arthurs	4	7^{16}	4	7	6
(United States) M Russell	4	0	6	1
WC	(France) A di Pasquale	6	6	4	6
(Netherlands) R Sluiter	7	2	7^{7}	4	4
(Thailand) P Srichaphan	5	6	6^{5}	6	6
Q	(Argentina) E Massa	6	6	3	2	4
19	(Sweden) T Enqvist	4	4	6	6	6
29	(Argentina) D Nalbandian	6	5	6	6
(Argentina) A Calleri	2	7	2	4
(Brazil) F Saretta	6	6	4	6^{5}	6
Q	(Austria) O Marach	2	2	6	7^{7}	4
(Belgium) O Rochus	6	7^{7}	6
(Hungary) A Sávolt	4	6^{0}	2
WC	(France) M Llodra	4	6	6^{7}	4
2	(Russia) M Safin	6	2	7^{9}	6

Second round
(Australia) W Arthurs	6^{4}	3	2
WC	(France) A di Pasquale	7^{7}	6	6
(Thailand) P Srichaphan	6	1	7	6
19	(Sweden) T Enqvist	4	6	5	3
29	(Argentina) D Nalbandian	6	6	6
(Brazil) F Saretta	3	4	0
(Belgium) O Rochus	6	2	6	3	3
2	(Russia) M Safin	4	6	3	6	6

Third round
WC	(France) A di Pasquale	6	6	6
(Thailand) P Srichaphan	4	3	3
29	(Argentina) D Nalbandian	3	3	6	4
2	(Russia) M Safin	6	6	3	6

Fourth round
WC	(France) A di Pasquale	6	4	3	2
2	(Russia) M Safin	3	6	6	6

Preceded by 2002 Australian Open – Men's singles	Grand Slam men's singles	Succeeded by 2002 Wimbledon Championships – Men's singles
