= Tomáš Cibulec =

Czech tennis player (born 1978)

- Country (sports): Czech Republic
- Residence: Havířov, Czech Republic
- Born: 15 January 1978 (age 47); Havířov, Czechoslovakia
- Height: 1.80 m (5 ft 11 in)
- Turned pro: 1996
- Plays: Right-handed
- Prize money: $721,654

Singles
- Career record: 0–0 (at ATP Tour level, Grand Slam level, and in Davis Cup)
- Career titles: 0
- Highest ranking: No. 646 (3 August 1998)

Grand Slam singles results
- Australian Open: N/A
- French Open: N/A
- Wimbledon: N/A
- US Open: N/A

Doubles
- Career record: 141–182 (at ATP Tour level, Grand Slam level, and in Davis Cup)
- Career titles: 3
- Highest ranking: No. 21 (17 March 2003)

Tomáš Cibulec (born 15 January 1978) is a retired Czech tennis player who turned professional in 1996. Cibulec reached his highest singles ranking on 3 August 1998, becoming world number 646. His career-high ranking of world number 21, he reached on 17 March 2003. A winner of three ATP doubles titles, Cibulec resides in Havířov, the city of his birth. Jindrich and Anna Cibulec are his parents. Before Cibulec became a professional, he became a tennis player at when he was seven.

== Tennis career ==
Cibulec has successfully partnered with compatriots Ota Fukárek, Leoš Friedl, Petr Pála, Pavel Vízner and Croatian Lovro Zovko. He also reached the 2002 French Open doubles semifinals with Leander Paes. However, Cibulec has only won ATP doubles tournaments with Vízner and Friedl. He has reached one final with Futarek, won one out of three finals with Friedl, lost in one final with both Pála, has won two out of five doubles finals with Vízner, and lost in one final with Zovko.

In 2007, Cibulec and Zovko made the final of the Kremlin Cup in Moscow, but the pairing lost to at-home Russians Dmitry Tursunov and former singles number one, Marat Safin, 6–2, 6–4 in the final. En route, however, Cibulec and Zovko defeated 2007 French Open and 2007 US Open finalists Lukáš Dlouhý and Cibulec's former partner Pavel Vízner 6–2, 6–2. At moscow, Dlouhý and Vízner were the second-seeded doubles entrants.

== ATP career finals ==
=== Doubles: 11 (3 titles, 8 runner-ups) ===
Result	W/L	Date	Tournament	Surface	Partner	Opponents	Score
Win	1–0	Jul 2000	San Marino	Clay	(Czech Republic) Leoš Friedl	(Argentina) Gastón Etlis (United States) Jack Waite	7–6^{(7–1)}, 7–5
Loss	1–1	Dec 2001	Chennai, India	Hard	(Czech Republic) Ota Fukárek	(India) Mahesh Bhupathi (India) Leander Paes	7–5, 2–6, 5–7
Loss	1–2	Jan 2003	Auckland, New Zealand	Hard	(Czech Republic) Leoš Friedl	(South Africa) David Adams (South Africa) Robbie Koenig	6–7^{(5–7)}, 6–3, 3–6
Loss	1–3	Jan 2003	Milan, Italy	Carpet (i)	(Czech Republic) Pavel Vízner	(Czech Republic) Radek Štěpánek (Czech Republic) Petr Luxa	4–6, 6–7^{(4–7)}
Loss	1–4	Feb 2003	Marseille, France	Hard (i)	(Czech Republic) Pavel Vízner	(France) Sébastien Grosjean (France) Fabrice Santoro	1–6, 4–6
Win	2–4	Feb 2003	Copenhagen, Denmark	Hard (i)	(Czech Republic) Pavel Vízner	(Germany) Michael Kohlmann (Austria) Julian Knowle	7–5, 5–7, 6–2
Win	3–4	Jul 2003	Stuttgart, Germany	Clay	(Czech Republic) Pavel Vízner	(Russia) Yevgeny Kafelnikov (Zimbabwe) Kevin Ullyett	3–6, 6–3, 6–4
Loss	3–5	May 2004	Sankt Pölten, Austria	Clay	(Czech Republic) Leoš Friedl	(Argentina) Mariano Hood (Czech Republic) Petr Pála	6–3, 5–7, 4–6
Loss	3–6	Jun 2004	Halle, Germany	Grass	(Czech Republic) Petr Pála	(India) Leander Paes (Czech Republic) David Rikl	2–6, 4–7
Loss	3–7	Jun 2005	s'Hertogenbosch, Netherlands	Grass	(Czech Republic) Leoš Friedl	(Czech Republic) Cyril Suk (Czech Republic) Pavel Vízner	3–6, 4–6
Loss	3–8	Oct 2007	Moscow, Russia	Hard (i)	(Croatia) Lovro Zovko	(Russia) Marat Safin (Russia) Dmitry Tursunov	4–6, 2–6
