= 2001 Wimbledon Championships – Boys' singles =

Boys' singles
- 2001 Wimbledon Championships

Final
- Champion: (Switzerland) Roman Valent
- Runner-up: (Luxembourg) Gilles Müller
- Score: 3–6, 7–5, 6–3

Details
- Draw: 64 (8 Q / 8 WC )
- Seeds: 16

Events
Singles	men	women		boys	girls
Doubles	men	women	mixed	boys	girls
WC Singles	men	women	quad
WC Doubles	men	women	quad
Legends	men	women	seniors
← 2000 ·	Wimbledon Championships	· 2002 →

Nicolas Mahut was the defending champion, but did not complete in the Juniors this year.

Roman Valent defeated Gilles Müller in the final, 3–6, 7–5, 6–3 to win the boys' singles tennis title at the 2001 Wimbledon Championships.

== Seeds ==
1. (Federal Republic of Yugoslavia) Janko Tipsarević (third round)
2. (Luxembourg) Gilles Müller (final)
3. (Mexico) Bruno Echagaray (first round)
4. (Argentina) Brian Dabul (first round)
5. (Colombia) Alejandro Falla (third round)
6. (Chinese Taipei) Wang Yeu-tzuoo (semifinals)
7. (United States) Ytai Abougzir (first round)
8. (Germany) Florian Mayer (second round)
9. (Sweden) Robin Söderling (second round)
10. (Switzerland) Roman Valent (champion)
11. (Algeria) Lamine Ouahab (first round)
12. (Argentina) Luciano Vitullo (third round)
13. (Switzerland) Stéphane Bohli (third round)
14. (Argentina) Lionel Noviski (third round)
15. (Chile) Paul Capdeville (second round)
16. (Australia) Todd Reid (quarterfinals)

Click on the seed number of a player to go to their draw section.

== Draw ==
=== Key ===
- Q = Qualifier
- WC = Wild card
- LL = Lucky loser
- Alt = Alternate
- SE = Special exempt
- PR = Protected ranking
- ITF = ITF entry
- JE = Junior exempt
- w/o = Walkover
- r = Retired
- d = Defaulted
- SR = Special ranking

=== Finals ===
Quarterfinals
16	(Australia) Todd Reid	3	5
6	(Chinese Taipei) Wang Yeu-tzuoo	6	7
(Canada) Frank Dancevic	6^{6}	2
10	(Switzerland) Roman Valent	7^{8}	6
Q	(United Kingdom) Ken Skupski	2	6^{4}
Q	(Germany) Philipp Petzschner	6	7^{7}
WC	(Ecuador) Giovanni Lapentti	6^{2}	6^{5}
2	(Luxembourg) Gilles Müller	7^{7}	7^{7}

Semifinals
6	(Chinese Taipei) Wang Yeu-tzuoo	6	4	3
10	(Switzerland) Roman Valent	4	6	6
Q	(Germany) Philipp Petzschner	3	6^{3}
2	(Luxembourg) Gilles Müller	6	7^{7}

Final
10	(Switzerland) Roman Valent	3	7	6
2	(Luxembourg) Gilles Müller	6	5	3

=== Top half ===
==== Section 1 ====
First round
1	(Federal Republic of Yugoslavia) Janko Tipsarević	6	6
WC	(United Kingdom) Tom Pocock	1	3
Q	(United States) Prakash Amritraj	6	3	4
Q	(United States) Brian Baker	4	6	6
(Croatia) Saša Tuksar	6^{5}	6	6
(Slovenia) Matija Zgaga	7^{7}	4	3
(Austria) Stefan Wiespeiner	3	6^{5}
16	(Australia) Todd Reid	6	7^{7}
12	(Argentina) Luciano Vitullo	7	5	6
(Germany) Simon Stadler	5	7	3
(United States) Matthew Emery	5	7	6
(United Kingdom) Andrew Banks	7	5	4
(Sweden) Christian Johansson	6	6
(United Kingdom) David Brewer	3	4
Q	(Australia) Raphael Durek	5	7^{9}	3
6	(Chinese Taipei) Wang Yeu-tzuoo	7	6^{7}	6

Second round
1	(Federal Republic of Yugoslavia) J Tipsarević	7^{7}	3	6
Q	(United States) B Baker	6^{4}	6	3
(Croatia) S Tuksar	6	6^{3}	5
16	(Australia) T Reid	4	7^{7}	7
12	(Argentina) L Vitullo	6	6
(United States) M Emery	0	4
(Sweden) C Johansson	2	1
6	(Chinese Taipei) Y-t Wang	6	6

Third round
1	(Federal Republic of Yugoslavia) J Tipsarević	6	2	4
16	(Australia) T Reid	3	6	6
12	(Argentina) L Vitullo	3	2
6	(Chinese Taipei) Y-t Wang	6	6

Quarterfinals
16	(Australia) T Reid	3	5
6	(Chinese Taipei) Y-t Wang	6	7

==== Section 2 ====
First round
3	(Mexico) Bruno Echagaray	3	6	2
(Italy) Alberto Brizzi	6	2	6
(Germany) Bastian Grönefeld	6	5	3
WC	(United Kingdom) Ross Hutchins	3	7	6
(Canada) Frank Dancevic	6	6
(Czech Republic) Jan Mašík	4	3
(Germany) Florian Lemke	0	1
15	(Chile) Paul Capdeville	6	6
10	(Switzerland) Roman Valent	7	6
(Romania) Adrian Cruciat	5	4
(Monaco) Benjamin Balleret	2	3
(Brazil) Marcelo Melo	6	6
WC	(United Kingdom) Matthew Smith	7	6
(Netherlands) Bart de Gier	5	1
(Jamaica) Ryan Russell	1	7^{11}	6
7	(United States) Ytai Abougzir	6	6^{9}	3

Second round
(Italy) A Brizzi	6	4	10
WC	(United Kingdom) R Hutchins	4	6	8
(Canada) F Dancevic	6	6
15	(Chile) P Capdeville	4	3
10	(Switzerland) R Valent	6	6
(Brazil) M Melo	4	3
WC	(United Kingdom) M Smith	2	6^{4}
(Jamaica) R Russell	6	7^{7}

Third round
(Italy) A Brizzi	6	5	1
(Canada) F Dancevic	3	7	6
10	(Switzerland) R Valent	6	6
(Jamaica) R Russell	3	3

Quarterfinals
(Canada) F Dancevic	6^{6}	2
10	(Switzerland) R Valent	7^{8}	6

=== Bottom half ===
==== Section 3 ====
First round
8	(Germany) Florian Mayer	6	7
WC	(United Kingdom) Naim Lalji	2	5
WC	(United Kingdom) Craig Evans	4	4
Q	(India) Sunil-Kumar Sipaeya	6	6
Q	(United Kingdom) Ken Skupski	6	6
(Austria) Markus Egger	3	3
Q	(Bulgaria) Yordan Kanev	3	4
9	(Sweden) Robin Söderling	6	6
13	(Switzerland) Stéphane Bohli	6	6
WC	(United Kingdom) Richard Bloomfield	4	4
(France) Marc Auradou	2	6^{2}
(Slovenia) Luka Gregorc	6	7^{7}
Q	(Germany) Philipp Petzschner	3	6	6
(United States) Jonathan Chu	6	3	1
(Cyprus) Marcos Baghdatis	6^{6}	7	9
4	(Argentina) Brian Dabul	7^{8}	5	7

Second round
8	(Germany) F Mayer	5	5
Q	(India) S-K Sipaeya	7	7
Q	(United Kingdom) K Skupski	6	6^{5}	6
9	(Sweden) R Söderling	4	7^{7}	3
13	(Switzerland) S Bohli	6	6
(Slovenia) L Gregorc	4	1
Q	(Germany) P Petzschner	7^{7}	6
(Cyprus) M Baghdatis	6^{2}	4

Third round
Q	(India) S-K Sipaeya	3	6	4
Q	(United Kingdom) K Skupski	6	4	6
13	(Switzerland) S Bohli	2	4
Q	(Germany) P Petzschner	6	6

Quarterfinals
Q	(United Kingdom) K Skupski	2	6^{4}
Q	(Germany) P Petzschner	6	7^{7}

==== Section 4 ====
First round
5	(Colombia) Alejandro Falla	6	6
(United States) Josh Cohen	4	1
(Mexico) Santiago González	6	6
(United Kingdom) Alex Bogdanovic	3	4
(Germany) Markus Bayer	3	7	8
(France) Clément Morel	6	5	6
WC	(Ecuador) Giovanni Lapentti	6	6
11/WC	(Algeria) Lamine Ouahab	2	1
14	(Argentina) Lionel Noviski	7	6
(Australia) Ryan Henry	5	3
(South Africa) Clinton Jacobs	6	6
(Austria) Daniel Köllerer	1	4
(Federal Republic of Yugoslavia) Dušan Mihailović	6	7
Q	(South Africa) Heinrich Heyl	3	5
(Venezuela) Óscar Posada	6	4	9
2	(Luxembourg) Gilles Müller	4	6	11

Second round
5	(Colombia) A Falla	6	6
(Mexico) S González	3	4
(Germany) M Bayer	3	3
WC	(Ecuador) G Lapentti	6	6
14	(Argentina) L Noviski	6	6
(South Africa) C Jacobs	4	2
(Federal Republic of Yugoslavia) D Mihailović	4	2
2	(Luxembourg) G Müller	6	6

Third round
5	(Colombia) A Falla	1	7^{7}	3
WC	(Ecuador) G Lapentti	6	6^{5}	6
14	(Argentina) L Noviski	0	1
2	(Luxembourg) G Müller	6	6

Quarterfinals
WC	(Ecuador) G Lapentti	6^{2}	6^{5}
2	(Luxembourg) G Müller	7^{7}	7^{7}
