= 2002 Wimbledon Championships – Boys' singles =

Boys' singles
- 2002 Wimbledon Championships

Final
- Champion: (Australia) Todd Reid
- Runner-up: (Algeria) Lamine Ouahab
- Score: 7–6^{(7-5)}, 6–4

Details
- Draw: 64 (8 Q / 8 WC )
- Seeds: 16

Events
Singles	men	women		boys	girls
Doubles	men	women	mixed	boys	girls
WC Singles	men	women	quad
WC Doubles	men	women	quad
Legends	men	women	seniors
← 2001 ·	Wimbledon Championships	· 2003 →

Roman Valent was the defending champion, but did not complete in the Juniors this year.

Todd Reid defeated Lamine Ouahab in the final, 7–6^{(7-5)}, 6–4 to win the boys' singles tennis title at the 2002 Wimbledon Championships.

== Seeds ==
1. (Chinese Taipei) Wang Yeu-tzuoo (first round)
2. (Argentina) Brian Dabul (first round)
3. (France) Clément Morel (second round)
4. (Cyprus) Marcos Baghdatis (second round)
5. (Australia) Todd Reid (champion)
6. (Uruguay) Marcel Felder (second round)
7. (Algeria) Lamine Ouahab (final)
8. (Germany) Philipp Petzschner (quarterfinals)
9. (United Kingdom) Alex Bogdanovic (second round)
10. (Uruguay) Martín Vilarrubí (first round)
11. (Belgium) Steve Darcis (semifinals)
12. (United States) Brian Baker (first round)
13. (France) Mathieu Montcourt (quarterfinals)
14. (Israel) Dudi Sela (first round)
15. (Czech Republic) Tomáš Berdych (second round)
16. (France) Jo-Wilfried Tsonga (third round)

Click on the seed number of a player to go to their draw section.

== Draw ==
=== Key ===
- Q = Qualifier
- WC = Wild card
- LL = Lucky loser
- Alt = Alternate
- SE = Special exempt
- PR = Protected ranking
- ITF = ITF entry
- JE = Junior exempt
- w/o = Walkover
- r = Retired
- d = Defaulted
- SR = Special ranking

=== Finals ===
Quarterfinals
(Netherlands) Michel Koning	3	6	1
5	(Australia) Todd Reid	6	3	6
13	(France) Mathieu Montcourt	4	6	4
11	(Belgium) Steve Darcis	6	2	6
7	(Algeria) Lamine Ouahab	3	6	6
(Slovenia) Luka Gregorc	6	4	1
8	(Germany) Philipp Petzschner	6	3	4
WC	(Spain) Rafael Nadal	2	6	6

Semifinals
5	(Australia) Todd Reid	3	6	6
11	(Belgium) Steve Darcis	6	2	2
7	(Algeria) Lamine Ouahab	6	7
WC	(Spain) Rafael Nadal	3	5

Final
5	(Australia) Todd Reid	7^{7}	6
7	(Algeria) Lamine Ouahab	6^{5}	4

=== Top half ===
==== Section 1 ====
First round
1	(Chinese Taipei) Wang Yeu-tzuoo	4	4
(Netherlands) Michel Koning	6	6
WC	(United Kingdom) Matthew Smith	6	7^{8}
LL	(Latvia) Andis Juška	2	6^{6}
WC	(United States) Rajeev Ram	7^{7}	6
(Brazil) Alexandre Bonatto	6^{0}	1
(Croatia) Davor Kušeta	5	6^{6}
16	(France) Jo-Wilfried Tsonga	7	7^{8}
12	(United States) Brian Baker	7^{7}	5	5
Q	(Australia) Raphael Durek	6^{4}	7	7
(United Kingdom) David Brewer	3	7^{7}	6
(South Africa) Christopher Westerhof	6	6^{1}	2
(Bulgaria) Yordan Kanev	6	6
(Hungary) György Balázs	4	2
(Canada) Frank Dancevic	1	7	0
5	(Australia) Todd Reid	6	5	6

Second round
(Netherlands) M Koning	7^{7}	7^{7}
WC	(United Kingdom) M Smith	6^{2}	6^{1}
WC	(United States) R Ram	6^{5}	4
16	(France) J-W Tsonga	7^{7}	6
Q	(Australia) R Durek	4	4
(United Kingdom) D Brewer	6	6
(Bulgaria) Y Kanev	1	1
5	(Australia) T Reid	6	6

Third round
(Netherlands) M Koning	3	6	8
16	(France) J-W Tsonga	6	3	6
(United Kingdom) D Brewer	6^{7}	2
5	(Australia) T Reid	7^{9}	6

Quarterfinals
(Netherlands) M Koning	3	6	1
5	(Australia) T Reid	6	3	6

==== Section 2 ====
First round
4	(Cyprus) Marcos Baghdatis	6	7^{7}
(United Kingdom) Nick Crawley	4	6^{5}
(Slovenia) Anže Kapun	2	5
(Germany) Markus Bayer	6	7
(Australia) Robert Smeets	3	7^{7}	6
Q	(Russia) Teymuraz Gabashvili	6	6^{4}	3
(Ecuador) Martin Stiegwardt	0	3
13	(France) Mathieu Montcourt	6	6
11	(Belgium) Steve Darcis	6	6
(Czech Republic) Daniel Lustig	3	4
(United States) Robert Yim	7^{7}	3	6
(Bolivia) Alberto Sottocorno	6^{4}	6	4
(Togo) Komlavi Loglo	6	6^{5}	4
WC	(United Kingdom) Josh Goodall	2	7^{7}	6
(Poland) Michał Przysiężny	1	5
6	(Uruguay) Marcel Felder	6	7

Second round
4	(Cyprus) M Baghdatis	2	4
(Germany) M Bayer	6	6
(Australia) R Smeets	2	3
13	(France) M Montcourt	6	6
11	(Belgium) S Darcis	6	6
(United States) R Yim	1	3
WC	(United Kingdom) J Goodall	3	6	6
6	(Uruguay) M Felder	6	4	4

Third round
(Germany) M Bayer	2	6	7
13	(France) M Montcourt	6	4	9
11	(Belgium) S Darcis	6	6
WC	(United Kingdom) J Goodall	3	2

Quarterfinals
13	(France) M Montcourt	4	6	4
11	(Belgium) S Darcis	6	2	6

=== Bottom half ===
==== Section 3 ====
First round
7	(Algeria) Lamine Ouahab	6^{3}	6	6
(Brazil) Franco Ferreiro	7^{7}	3	2
(Australia) Robert Haybittel	4	4
Q	(Jamaica) Dustin Brown	6	6
WC	(United Kingdom) Andy Murray	6^{5}	6	4
Q	(Belarus) Alexander Skrypko	7^{7}	4	6
Q	(Russia) Artem Sitak	0	0
9	(United Kingdom) Alex Bogdanovic	6	6
14	(Israel) Dudi Sela	6	4	1
(Slovenia) Luka Gregorc	1	6	6
Q	(Mexico) Antonio Ruiz-Rosales	6	6
WC	(United Kingdom) Robert Searle	3	4
(United States) Brendan Evans	6^{4}	0
(Australia) Ryan Henry	7^{7}	6
Q	(United Kingdom) Craig Evans	6^{2}	6	3
3	(France) Clément Morel	7	3	6

Second round
7	(Algeria) L Ouahab	3	6	6
Q	(Jamaica) D Brown	6	4	3
Q	(Belarus) A Skrypko	7^{7}	7^{7}
9	(United Kingdom) A Bogdanovic	6^{5}	6^{4}
(Slovenia) L Gregorc	6	6
Q	(Mexico) A Ruiz-Rosales	2	4
(Australia) R Henry	7	6^{3}	26
3	(France) C Morel	5	7^{7}	24

Third round
7	(Algeria) L Ouahab	7^{7}	6
Q	(Belarus) A Skrypko	6^{4}	1
(Slovenia) L Gregorc	6	3	6
(Australia) R Henry	4	6	1

Quarterfinals
7	(Algeria) L Ouahab	3	6	6
(Slovenia) L Gregorc	6	4	1

==== Section 4 ====
First round
8	(Germany) Philipp Petzschner	6	7
(Netherlands) Bas van der Valk	4	5
(Australia) Chris Guccione	6	6
(United States) Josh Cohen	1	3
(Romania) Horia Tecău	6^{7}	2
WC	(United Kingdom) Guy Thomas	7^{9}	6
Q	(Romania) Florin Mergea	6	6
10	(Uruguay) Martín Vilarrubí	3	3
15	(Czech Republic) Tomáš Berdych	6	6
(Japan) Go Soeda	4	2
(Chinese Taipei) Liu Tai-wei	1	4
(Sweden) Michael Ryderstedt	6	6
(United States) Chris Kwon	7	6
WC	(United Kingdom) Ross Hutchins	5	1
WC	(Spain) Rafael Nadal	5	6	6
2	(Argentina) Brian Dabul	7	4	2

Second round
8	(Germany) P Petzschner	7^{7}	7^{7}
(Australia) C Guccione	6^{4}	6^{4}
WC	(United Kingdom) G Thomas	7^{7}	6
Q	(Romania) F Mergea	6^{5}	4
15	(Czech Republic) T Berdych	4	7	6
(Sweden) M Ryderstedt	6	5	8
(United States) C Kwon	4	0
WC	(Spain) R Nadal	6	6

Third round
8	(Germany) P Petzschner	6	7
WC	(United Kingdom) G Thomas	4	5
(Sweden) M Ryderstedt	3	0
WC	(Spain) R Nadal	6	6

Quarterfinals
8	(Germany) P Petzschner	6	3	4
WC	(Spain) R Nadal	2	6	6
