= 2001 Wimbledon Championships – Boys' doubles =

Boys' doubles
- 2001 Wimbledon Championships

Final
- Champions: (Canada) Frank Dancevic (Ecuador) Giovanni Lapentti
- Runners-up: (Mexico) Bruno Echagaray (Mexico) Santiago González
- Score: 6–1, 6–4

Events
Singles	men	women		boys	girls
Doubles	men	women	mixed	boys	girls
WC Singles	men	women	quad
WC Doubles	men	women	quad
Legends	men	women	seniors
← 2000 ·	Wimbledon Championships	· 2002 →

Dominique Coene and Kristof Vliegen were the defending champions, but they did not compete in the Juniors this year.

Frank Dancevic and Giovanni Lapentti defeated Bruno Echagaray and Santiago González in the final, 6–1, 6–4 to win the boys' doubles tennis title at the 2001 Wimbledon Championships.

== Seeds ==
1. (Mexico) Bruno Echagaray / (Mexico) Santiago González (final)
2. (Colombia) Alejandro Falla / (Colombia) Carlos Salamanca (first round)
3. (Czech Republic) Tomáš Berdych / (Netherlands) Bart de Gier (first round)
4. (United States) Ytai Abougzir / (Argentina) Luciano Vitullo (first round)
5. (Brazil) Marcelo Melo / (Argentina) Lionel Noviski (first round)
6. (Australia) Ryan Henry / (Australia) Todd Reid (first round)
7. (Chile) Paul Capdeville / (Venezuela) Óscar Posada (second round)
8. (Canada) Frank Dancevic / (Ecuador) Giovanni Lapentti (champions)

== Draw ==
=== Key ===
- Q = Qualifier
- WC = Wild card
- LL = Lucky loser
- Alt = Alternate
- SE = Special exempt
- PR = Protected ranking
- ITF = ITF entry
- JE = Junior exempt
- w/o = Walkover
- r = Retired
- d = Defaulted
- SR = Special ranking

=== Finals ===
Semifinals
1	(Mexico) Bruno Echagaray (Mexico) Santiago González	4	7^{7}	6
(Slovenia) Luka Gregorc (Jamaica) Ryan Russell	6	6^{3}	4
(Germany) Philipp Petzschner (Germany) Simon Stadler	7^{7}	2	4
8	(Canada) Frank Dancevic (Ecuador) Giovanni Lapentti	6^{5}	6	6

Final
1	(Mexico) Bruno Echagaray (Mexico) Santiago González	1	4
8	(Canada) Frank Dancevic (Ecuador) Giovanni Lapentti	6	6

=== Top half ===
First round
1	(Mexico) Bruno Echagaray (Mexico) Santiago González	6	6
(United States) Josh Cohen (Australia) Raphael Durek	1	3
(United States) Jonathan Chu (Slovenia) Matija Zgaga	6	6
(Switzerland) Stéphane Bohli (Croatia) Saša Tuksar	3	3
(Australia) Clinton Letcher (India) Sunil-Kumar Sipaeya	6	6
WC	(United Kingdom) Ross Hutchins (United Kingdom) Benjamin Riby	0	3
(South Africa) Robert Blair (South Africa) Clinton Jacobs	6^{4}	6	2
7	(Chile) Paul Capdeville (Venezuela) Óscar Posada	7^{7}	1	6
3	(Czech Republic) Tomáš Berdych (Netherlands) Bart de Gier	3	7^{9}	3
(United States) Brian Baker (United States) Matthew Emery	6	6^{7}	6
(Slovenia) Luka Gregorc (Jamaica) Ryan Russell	6	4	6
(Sweden) Christian Johansson (Sweden) Robin Söderling	4	6	3
(United States) Prakash Amritraj (United States) Stephen Amritraj	5	3
(South Africa) Heinrich Heyl (Russia) Pavel Ivanov	7	6
(Algeria) Lamine Ouahab (Chinese Taipei) Wang Yeu-tzuoo	6	1	8
5	(Brazil) Marcelo Melo (Argentina) Lionel Noviski	3	6	6

Second round
1	(Mexico) B Echagaray (Mexico) S González	6	7^{7}
(United States) J Chu (Slovenia) M Zgaga	4	6^{4}
(Australia) C Letcher (India) S-K Sipaeya	6	6
7	(Chile) P Capdeville (Venezuela) Ó Posada	2	4
(United States) B Baker (United States) M Emery	2	3
(Slovenia) L Gregorc (Jamaica) R Russell	6	6
(South Africa) H Heyl (Russia) P Ivanov	6	7
(Algeria) L Ouahab (Chinese Taipei) Y-t Wang	4	5

Quarterfinals
1	(Mexico) B Echagaray (Mexico) S González	6	7^{7}
(Australia) C Letcher (India) S-K Sipaeya	3	6^{4}
(Slovenia) L Gregorc (Jamaica) R Russell	6	6
(South Africa) H Heyl (Russia) P Ivanov	2	4

Semifinals
1	(Mexico) B Echagaray (Mexico) S González	4	7^{7}	6
(Slovenia) L Gregorc (Jamaica) R Russell	6	6^{3}	4

=== Bottom half ===
First round
6	(Australia) Ryan Henry (Australia) Todd Reid	7^{7}	4	1
(Germany) Philipp Petzschner (Germany) Simon Stadler	6^{2}	6	6
(Germany) Markus Bayer (Germany) Florian Mayer	6	7^{7}
(Russia) Teymuraz Gabashvili (United Kingdom) Tom Pocock	4	6^{5}
(Poland) Adam Chadaj (Czech Republic) Jan Mašík	6^{4}	7^{8}	11
(Ghana) Henry Adjei-Darko (Togo) Komlavi Loglo	7^{7}	6^{6}	9
(United Kingdom) Richard Bloomfield (New Zealand) Jacob Olsen	6^{4}	6	6
4	(United States) Ytai Abougzir (Argentina) Luciano Vitullo	7^{7}	2	4
8	(Canada) Frank Dancevic (Ecuador) Giovanni Lapentti	6	7^{7}
WC	(United Kingdom) David Brewer (United Kingdom) Guy Thomas	3	6^{2}
(United Kingdom) Craig Evans (United Kingdom) Matthew Smith	3	5
(Bulgaria) Yordan Kanev (Australia) Goran Kovačević	6	7
(Austria) Daniel Köllerer (Austria) Stefan Wiespeiner	6	6^{2}	2
(Monaco) Benjamin Balleret (Luxembourg) Gilles Müller	4	7^{7}	6
(Italy) Alberto Brizzi (United States) Jason Zimmermann	6^{12}	7^{7}	6
2	(Colombia) Alejandro Falla (Colombia) Carlos Salamanca	7^{14}	6^{5}	4

Second round
(Germany) P Petzschner (Germany) S Stadler	6	6
(Germany) M Bayer (Germany) F Mayer	2	2
(Poland) A Chadaj (Czech Republic) J Masik	6	6
(United Kingdom) R Bloomfield (New Zealand) J Olsen	3	4
8	(Canada) F Dancevic (Ecuador) G Lapentti	6^{6}	6	6
(Bulgaria) Y Kanev (Australia) G Kovačević	7^{8}	4	4
(Monaco) B Balleret (Luxembourg) G Müller	5	6	10
(Italy) A Brizzi (United States) J Zimmermann	7	3	8

Quarterfinals
(Germany) P Petzschner (Germany) S Stadler	6	6
(Poland) A Chadaj (Czech Republic) J Masik	2	1
8	(Canada) F Dancevic (Ecuador) G Lapentti	6	6
(Monaco) B Balleret (Luxembourg) G Müller	4	3

Semifinals
(Germany) P Petzschner (Germany) S Stadler	7^{7}	2	4
8	(Canada) F Dancevic (Ecuador) G Lapentti	6^{5}	6	6
