= 2001 Wimbledon Championships – Mixed doubles =

Mixed doubles
- 2001 Wimbledon Championships

Final
- Champions: (Czech Republic) Leoš Friedl (Slovakia) Daniela Hantuchová
- Runners-up: (United States) Mike Bryan (South Africa) Liezel Huber
- Score: 4–6, 6–3, 6–2
- Date: 9 July 2001 (Note: Originally scheduled for 7 July, but was postponed to two days due to unfinished matches to rain.)

Details
- Draw: 64 (5WC)
- Seeds: 16

Events
Singles	men	women		boys	girls
Doubles	men	women	mixed	boys	girls
WC Singles	men	women	quad
WC Doubles	men	women	quad
Legends	men	women	seniors
- Wimbledon Championships

Donald Johnson and Kimberly Po-Messerli were the defending champions but lost in the quarterfinals to Leoš Friedl and Daniela Hantuchová.

Friedl and Hantuchová defeated Mike Bryan and Liezel Huber in the final, 4–6, 6–3, 6–2 to win the mixed doubles tennis title at the 2001 Wimbledon Championships.

== Seeds ==
1. (Australia) Todd Woodbridge / (Australia) Rennae Stubbs (second round)
2. (South Africa) Ellis Ferreira / (Japan) Ai Sugiyama (quarterfinals)
3. (Australia) Sandon Stolle / (Zimbabwe) Cara Black (second round)
4. (India) Mahesh Bhupathi / (Russia) Elena Likhovtseva (semifinals)
5. (United States) Donald Johnson / (United States) Kimberly Po-Messerli (quarterfinals)
6. (India) Leander Paes / (United States) Lisa Raymond (third round)
7. (United States) Jared Palmer / (Spain) Arantxa Sánchez Vicario (first round)
8. (Australia) Joshua Eagle / (Austria) Barbara Schett (first round)
9. (The Bahamas) Mark Knowles / (United States) Nicole Arendt (third round)
10. (Argentina) Lucas Arnold Ker / (Argentina) Paola Suárez (second round)
11. (Czech Republic) Petr Pála / (Slovakia) Janette Husárová (first round)
12. (United States) Rick Leach / (South Africa) Amanda Coetzer (third round)
13. (Czech Republic) Jiří Novák / (Netherlands) Miriam Oremans (third round)
14. (United States) Jeff Tarango / (Federal Republic of Yugoslavia) Jelena Dokić (third round)
15. (Czech Republic) David Rikl / (Slovakia) Karina Habšudová (semifinals)
16. (Czech Republic) Pavel Vízner / (Italy) Tathiana Garbin (second round)

Click on the seed number of a player to go to their draw section.

== Draw ==
Key

- Q = Qualifier
- WC = Wild card
- LL = Lucky loser
- Alt = Alternate
- ITF = ITF entry
- PR = Protected ranking
- SR = Special ranking
- SE = Special exempt
- JE = Junior exempt
- JR = Junior Accelerator Programme entrant
- CO = College Accelerator Programme entrant
- NG = Next Gen Accelerator Program entrant
- w/o = Walkover
- r = Retired
- d = Defaulted

=== Finals ===
Quarterfinals
(Czech Republic) Leoš Friedl (Slovakia) Daniela Hantuchová	6	6
5	(United States) Donald Johnson (United States) Kimberly Po-Messerli	2	3
15	(Czech Republic) David Rikl (Slovakia) Karina Habšudová	6	6
(South Africa) Myles Wakefield (South Africa) Nannie de Villiers	3	2
(United States) Bob Bryan (Australia) Lisa McShea	1	6	13
4	(India) Mahesh Bhupathi (Russia) Elena Likhovtseva	6	4	15
(United States) Mike Bryan (South Africa) Liezel Huber	6	6
2	(South Africa) Ellis Ferreira (Japan) Ai Sugiyama	3	2

Semifinals
(Czech Republic) Leoš Friedl (Slovakia) Daniela Hantuchová	6	5	6
15	(Czech Republic) David Rikl (Slovakia) Karina Habšudová	2	7	3
4	(India) Mahesh Bhupathi (Russia) Elena Likhovtseva	2	2
(United States) Mike Bryan (South Africa) Liezel Huber	6	6

Final
(Czech Republic) Leoš Friedl (Slovakia) Daniela Hantuchová	4	6	6
(United States) Mike Bryan (South Africa) Liezel Huber	6	3	2

=== Top half ===
==== Section 1 ====
First round
1	(Australia) T Woodbridge (Australia) R Stubbs	6	6
(Argentina) P Albano (France) A Fusai	3	2
(Czech Republic) L Friedl (Slovakia) D Hantuchová	6	6
(United States) D Bowen (Spain) MJ Martínez Sánchez	0	3
WC	(United Kingdom) J Davidson (United Kingdom) V Davies	2	7^{10}	4
(France) J Boutter (France) N Dechy	6	6^{8}	6
WC	(United Kingdom) B Cowan (United Kingdom) J Pullin	6^{5}	4
13	(Czech Republic) J Novák (Netherlands) M Oremans	7^{7}	6
12	(United States) R Leach (South Africa) A Coetzer	7	6^{4}	6
(Japan) T Shimada (Japan) N Miyagi	5	7^{7}	2
(United States) B MacPhie (Australia) N Pratt	7^{7}	7
(South Africa) D Adams (Argentina) ME Salerni	6^{1}	5
(Australia) D Macpherson (Australia) R McQuillan	2	6	4
(Spain) T Carbonell (Spain) V Ruano Pascual	6	4	6
WC	(United Kingdom) J Nelson (United Kingdom) H Crook	0	3
5	(United States) D Johnson (United States) K Po-Messerli	6	6

Second round
1	(Australia) T Woodbridge (Australia) R Stubbs	6	3	4
(Czech Republic) L Friedl (Slovakia) D Hantuchová	1	6	6
(France) J Boutter (France) N Dechy	2	7	5
13	(Czech Republic) J Novák (Netherlands) M Oremans	6	5	7
12	(United States) R Leach (South Africa) A Coetzer	7^{7}	6
(United States) B MacPhie (Australia) N Pratt	6^{3}	4
(Spain) T Carbonell (Spain) V Ruano Pascual	3	2
5	(United States) D Johnson (United States) K Po-Messerli	6	6

Third round
(Czech Republic) L Friedl (Slovakia) D Hantuchová	7^{7}	6
13	(Czech Republic) J Novák (Netherlands) M Oremans	6^{2}	4
12	(United States) R Leach (South Africa) A Coetzer	4	2
5	(United States) D Johnson (United States) K Po-Messerli	6	6

Quarterfinals
(Czech Republic) L Friedl (Slovakia) D Hantuchová	6	6
5	(United States) D Johnson (United States) K Po-Messerli	2	3

==== Section 2 ====
First round
3	(Australia) S Stolle (Zimbabwe) C Black	6	6
(Sweden) S Aspelin (Slovenia) T Križan	3	4
(Czech Republic) M Damm (Slovakia) H Nagyová	7^{10}	7
(Spain) A Portas (Spain) A Medina Garrigues	6^{8}	5
(Argentina) A Schneiter (Japan) R Hiraki	3	4
(Switzerland) L Manta (Italy) L Golarsa	6	6
(Russia) A Olhovskiy (Austria) S Plischke	4	6^{6}
15	(Czech Republic) D Rikl (Slovakia) K Habšudová	6	7^{8}
9	(The Bahamas) M Knowles (United States) N Arendt	6	6
WC	(United States) S Capriati (United States) J Capriati	1	4
(Czech Republic) C Suk (United States) M Shaughnessy	3	4
(South Africa) G Stafford (United States) L McNeil	6	6
(Australia) M Hill (Netherlands) K Boogert	6	3	9
(South Africa) M Wakefield (South Africa) N de Villiers	4	6	11
(South Africa) J-L de Jager (Ukraine) E Tatarkova	6	6
7	(United States) J Palmer (Spain) A Sánchez Vicario	4	4

Second round
3	(Australia) S Stolle (Zimbabwe) C Black	4	4
(Czech Republic) M Damm (Slovakia) H Nagyová	6	6
(Switzerland) L Manta (Italy) L Golarsa	4	4
15	(Czech Republic) D Rikl (Slovakia) K Habšudová	6	6
9	(The Bahamas) M Knowles (United States) N Arendt	7	3	6
(South Africa) G Stafford (United States) L McNeil	5	6	4
(South Africa) M Wakefield (South Africa) N de Villiers	6	6
(South Africa) J-L de Jager (Ukraine) E Tatarkova	2	2

Third round
(Czech Republic) M Damm (Slovakia) H Nagyová	3	4
15	(Czech Republic) D Rikl (Slovakia) K Habšudová	6	6
9	(The Bahamas) M Knowles (United States) N Arendt	4	6	5
(South Africa) M Wakefield (South Africa) N de Villiers	6	4	7

Quarterfinals
15	(Czech Republic) D Rikl (Slovakia) K Habšudová	6	6
(South Africa) M Wakefield (South Africa) N de Villiers	3	2

=== Bottom half ===
==== Section 3 ====
First round
6	(India) L Paes (United States) L Raymond	6	6
(South Africa) M Barnard (Netherlands) C Vis	2	1
(Belarus) M Mirnyi (United States) M Navratilova	6	7
(United States) M Sprengelmeyer (United States) L Osterloh	4	5
(United States) B Bryan (Australia) L McShea	6	7
(United States) J Thomas (Chinese Taipei) J Lee	2	5
(Australia) A Fisher (South Africa) K Grant	1	6	6
11	(Czech Republic) P Pála (Slovakia) J Husárová	6	2	4
14	(United States) J Tarango (Federal Republic of Yugoslavia) J Dokić	3	6	6
(South Africa) J Coetzee (United States) C Rubin	6	4	1
(South Africa) R Koenig (Australia) A Ellwood	7^{9}	3	4
(South Africa) C Haggard (Belgium) E Callens	6^{7}	6	6
(Australia) A Florent (Germany) A Huber	6^{2}	6	2
(Australia) A Kratzmann (Spain) M Serna	7^{7}	2	6
(United States) S Humphries (France) A-G Sidot	4	4
4	(India) M Bhupathi (Russia) E Likhovtseva	6	6

Second round
6	(India) L Paes (United States) L Raymond	6	6
(Belarus) M Mirnyi (United States) M Navratilova	3	4
(United States) B Bryan (Australia) L McShea	6	6
(Australia) A Fisher (South Africa) K Grant	4	4
14	(United States) J Tarango (Federal Republic of Yugoslavia) J Dokić
(South Africa) C Haggard (Belgium) E Callens	w/o
(Australia) A Kratzmann (Spain) M Serna	4	6	2
4	(India) M Bhupathi (Russia) E Likhovtseva	6	4	6

Third round
6	(India) L Paes (United States) L Raymond	7	5	5
(United States) B Bryan (Australia) L McShea	5	7	7
14	(United States) J Tarango (Federal Republic of Yugoslavia) J Dokić	4	6	4
4	(India) M Bhupathi (Russia) E Likhovtseva	6	4	6

Quarterfinals
(United States) B Bryan (Australia) L McShea	1	6	13
4	(India) M Bhupathi (Russia) E Likhovtseva	6	4	15

==== Section 4 ====
First round
8	(Australia) J Eagle (Austria) B Schett	4	5
(South Africa) J Weir-Smith (United States) K Schlukebir	6	7
(Germany) K Braasch (Germany) B Rittner	3	7^{7}	6
(Australia) P Hanley (Canada) S Jeyaseelan	6	6^{4}	4
(Sweden) J Landsberg (Sweden) Å Carlsson	7^{7}	3	7
(United States) M Bryan (South Africa) L Huber	6^{5}	6	9
(United States) J Waite (Australia) K-A Guse	3	5
10	(Argentina) L Arnold Ker (Argentina) P Suárez	6	7
16	(Czech Republic) P Vízner (Italy) T Garbin	5	6	6
(Argentina) M Hood (Belarus) T Poutchek	7	3	4
WC	(United Kingdom) K Spencer (United Kingdom) L Woodroffe	6^{5}	3
(Belgium) T Vanhoudt (Slovenia) K Srebotnik	7^{7}	6
(Italy) D Nargiso (Uzbekistan) I Tulyaganova	4	6^{4}
(Argentina) M García (Argentina) L Montalvo	6	7^{7}
(South Africa) B Haygarth (Argentina) P Tarabini	4	3
2	(South Africa) E Ferreira (Japan) A Sugiyama	6	6

Second round
(South Africa) J Weir-Smith (United States) K Schlukebir	1	4
(Germany) K Braasch (Germany) B Rittner	6	6
(United States) M Bryan (South Africa) L Huber	6	6
10	(Argentina) L Arnold Ker (Argentina) P Suárez	4	2
16	(Czech Republic) P Vízner (Italy) T Garbin	3	6	0
(Belgium) T Vanhoudt (Slovenia) K Srebotnik	6	3	6
(Argentina) M García (Argentina) L Montalvo	5	1
2	(South Africa) E Ferreira (Japan) A Sugiyama	7	6

Third round
(Germany) K Braasch (Germany) B Rittner	6^{2}	6	11
(United States) M Bryan (South Africa) L Huber	7^{7}	3	13
(Belgium) T Vanhoudt (Slovenia) K Srebotnik	3	6	7
2	(South Africa) E Ferreira (Japan) A Sugiyama	6	2	9

Quarterfinals
(United States) M Bryan (South Africa) L Huber	6	6
2	(South Africa) E Ferreira (Japan) A Sugiyama	3	2
