= 2001 Wimbledon Championships – Men's doubles =

Men's doubles
- 2001 Wimbledon Championships

Final
- Champions: (United States) Donald Johnson (United States) Jared Palmer
- Runners-up: (Czech Republic) Jiří Novák (Czech Republic) David Rikl
- Score: 6–4, 4–6, 6–3, 7–6^{(8–6)}
- Date: 8 July 2001

Details
- Draw: 64 (4Q / 7WC)
- Seeds: 16

Events
Singles	men	women		boys	girls
Doubles	men	women	mixed	boys	girls
WC Singles	men	women	quad
WC Doubles	men	women	quad
Legends	men	women	seniors
- Wimbledon Championships

Todd Woodbridge and Mark Woodforde were the defending champions, but Woodforde had retired from the tour. Woodbridge partnered with Jonas Björkman but lost in the third round to Bob and Mike Bryan.

Donald Johnson and Jared Palmer defeated Jiří Novák and David Rikl in the final, 6–4, 4–6, 6–3, 7–6^{(8–6)}, to win the gentlemen's doubles title at the 2001 Wimbledon Championships

== Seeds ==
1. (Sweden) Jonas Björkman / (Australia) Todd Woodbridge (third round)
2. (Canada) Daniel Nestor / (Australia) Sandon Stolle (second round)
3. (Czech Republic) Jiří Novák / (Czech Republic) David Rikl (final)
4. (United States) Donald Johnson / (United States) Jared Palmer (champions)
5. (South Africa) Ellis Ferreira / (United States) Rick Leach (quarterfinals)
6. (India) Mahesh Bhupathi / (India) Leander Paes (first round)
7. (Czech Republic) Petr Pála / (Czech Republic) Pavel Vízner (quarterfinals)
8. (Australia) Joshua Eagle / (Australia) Andrew Florent (second round)
9. (Australia) Michael Hill / (United States) Jeff Tarango (third round)
10. (Germany) David Prinosil / (Czech Republic) Cyril Suk (second round)
11. (The Bahamas) Mark Knowles / (United States) Brian MacPhie (third round)
12. (Zimbabwe) Wayne Black / (Zimbabwe) Kevin Ullyett (first round)
13. (Switzerland) Roger Federer / (South Africa) Wayne Ferreira (third round, withdrew)
14. (Zimbabwe) Byron Black / (United States) Alex O'Brien (first round)
15. (United States) Bob Bryan / (United States) Mike Bryan (semifinals)
16. (United States) Scott Humphries / (Canada) Sébastien Lareau (first round)

Click on the seed number of a player to go to their draw section.

== Draw ==
Key

- Q = Qualifier
- WC = Wild card
- LL = Lucky loser
- Alt = Alternate
- ITF = ITF entry
- PR = Protected ranking
- SR = Special ranking
- SE = Special exempt
- JE = Junior exempt
- JR = Junior Accelerator Programme entrant
- CO = College Accelerator Programme entrant
- NG = Next Gen Accelerator Program entrant
- w/o = Walkover
- r = Retired
- d = Defaulted

=== Finals ===
Quarterfinals
15	(United States) Bob Bryan (United States) Mike Bryan	6	7^{10}	7^{7}
5	(South Africa) Ellis Ferreira (United States) Rick Leach	4	6^{8}	6^{5}
3	(Czech Republic) Jiří Novák (Czech Republic) David Rikl	6	6	7^{7}
(South Africa) Chris Haggard (Belgium) Tom Vanhoudt	2	1	6^{2}
(Spain) Joan Balcells (Netherlands) Sjeng Schalken	6	7^{7}	6^{5}	6^{6}	4
4	(United States) Donald Johnson (United States) Jared Palmer	3	6^{5}	7^{7}	7^{8}	6
7	(Czech Republic) Petr Pála (Czech Republic) Pavel Vízner	6^{4}	7	6	4	7
WC	(Belarus) Max Mirnyi (Belarus) Vladimir Voltchkov	7^{7}	5	3	6	9

Semifinals
15	(United States) Bob Bryan (United States) Mike Bryan	4	6^{1}	6	1
3	(Czech Republic) Jiří Novák (Czech Republic) David Rikl	6	7^{7}	4	6
4	(United States) Donald Johnson (United States) Jared Palmer	7^{7}	4	7	6
WC	(Belarus) Max Mirnyi (Belarus) Vladimir Voltchkov	6^{3}	6	5	3

Final
3	(Czech Republic) Jiří Novák (Czech Republic) David Rikl	4	6	3	6^{6}
4	(United States) Donald Johnson (United States) Jared Palmer	6	4	6	7^{8}

=== Top half ===
==== Section 1 ====
First round
1	(Sweden) J Björkman (Australia) T Woodbridge	6	6	7
WC	(France) A Clément (France) N Escudé	3	2	5
(Israel) H Levy (Argentina) D Orsanic	1	4	7^{10}	6	6
(Australia) T Crichton (South Africa) P Rosner	6	6	6^{8}	4	2
WC	(United Kingdom) B Cowan (United Kingdom) J Delgado	6	6^{10}	0	6^{3}
(Australia) P Hanley (Australia) A Kratzmann	4	7^{12}	6	7^{7}
WC	(United Kingdom) L Childs (United Kingdom) J Nelson	3	4	4
15	(United States) B Bryan (United States) M Bryan	6	6	6
11	(The Bahamas) M Knowles (United States) B MacPhie	4	4	7^{7}	6	6
(United States) D Bowen (Australia) A Fisher	6	6	6^{4}	2	2
(Argentina) S Roitman (Argentina) A Schneiter	3	3	6	7^{7}	2
(South Africa) J-L de Jager (United States) J Stark	6	6	4	6^{5}	6
(Germany) M-K Goellner (Russia) A Olhovskiy	6	7	3	6
(Czech Republic) M Damm (Slovakia) D Hrbatý	3	5	6	4
(Germany) K Braasch (Germany) J Knippschild	0	3	6	4
5	(South Africa) E Ferreira (United States) R Leach	6	6	3	6

Second round
1	(Sweden) J Björkman (Australia) T Woodbridge	6	6	6
(Israel) H Levy (Argentina) D Orsanic	3	4	4
(Australia) P Hanley (Australia) A Kratzmann	7^{7}	4	1	7^{7}	4
15	(United States) B Bryan (United States) M Bryan	6^{1}	6	6	6^{3}	6
11	(The Bahamas) M Knowles (United States) B MacPhie	6	6	6
(South Africa) J-L de Jager (United States) J Stark	4	4	3
(Germany) M-K Goellner (Russia) A Olhovskiy	6^{1}	4	6^{4}
5	(South Africa) E Ferreira (United States) R Leach	7^{7}	6	7^{7}

Third round
1	(Sweden) J Björkman (Australia) T Woodbridge	6^{1}	6^{4}	3
15	(United States) B Bryan (United States) M Bryan	7^{7}	7^{7}	6
11	(The Bahamas) M Knowles (United States) B MacPhie	6^{2}	4	6^{5}
5	(South Africa) E Ferreira (United States) R Leach	7^{7}	6	7^{7}

Quarterfinals
15	(United States) B Bryan (United States) M Bryan	6	7^{10}	7^{7}
5	(South Africa) E Ferreira (United States) R Leach	4	6^{8}	6^{5}

==== Section 2 ====
First round
3	(Czech Republic) J Novák (Czech Republic) D Rikl	6	6	1	6
(Argentina) M García (Italy) D Nargiso	4	4	6	2
(Czech Republic) F Čermák (Spain) A Martín	4	0	6^{6}
(Japan) T Shimada (South Africa) M Wakefield	6	6	7^{8}
(Philippines) E Taino (United States) J Waite	6	6	6^{8}	4	3
(North Macedonia) A Kitinov (Federal Republic of Yugoslavia) N Zimonjić	4	3	7^{10}	6	6
(Sweden) S Aspelin (Sweden) J Landsberg	6	7^{7}	6
16	(United States) S Humphries (Canada) S Lareau	4	6^{5}	2
12	(Zimbabwe) W Black (Zimbabwe) K Ullyett	6	3	6^{4}	4
(Czech Republic) T Cibulec (Czech Republic) L Friedl	3	6	7^{7}	6
(Israel) N Behr (Israel) E Ran	6^{4}	6^{2}	2
(South Africa) C Haggard (Belgium) T Vanhoudt	7^{7}	7^{7}	6
(Australia) P Kilderry (Australia) P Tramacchi	7^{7}	4	6	6
WC	(United Kingdom) O Freelove (United Kingdom) K Spencer	6^{2}	6	4	3
(South Africa) D Adams (France) M Llodra	6	6	6
6	(India) M Bhupathi (India) L Paes	1	3	3

Second round
3	(Czech Republic) J Novák (Czech Republic) D Rikl	7^{7}	6	7
(Japan) T Shimada (South Africa) M Wakefield	6^{4}	3	5
(North Macedonia) A Kitinov (Federal Republic of Yugoslavia) N Zimonjić	7	7^{9}	5	6
(Sweden) S Aspelin (Sweden) J Landsberg	5	6^{7}	7	4
(Czech Republic) T Cibulec (Czech Republic) L Friedl	6	6^{9}	6	0	10
(South Africa) C Haggard (Belgium) T Vanhoudt	1	7^{11}	2	6	12
(Australia) P Kilderry (Australia) P Tramacchi	2	2	2
(South Africa) D Adams (France) M Llodra	6	6	6

Third round
3	(Czech Republic) J Novák (Czech Republic) D Rikl	6	6	6
(North Macedonia) A Kitinov (Federal Republic of Yugoslavia) N Zimonjić	3	3	4
(South Africa) C Haggard (Belgium) T Vanhoudt	6	6^{0}	6	2	6
(South Africa) D Adams (France) M Llodra	4	7^{7}	3	6	3

Quarterfinals
3	(Czech Republic) J Novák (Czech Republic) D Rikl	6	6	7^{7}
(South Africa) C Haggard (Belgium) T Vanhoudt	2	1	6^{2}

=== Bottom half ===
==== Section 3 ====
First round
8	(Australia) J Eagle (Australia) A Florent	6	6	5	6^{3}	18
(Spain) JI Carrasco (Czech Republic) O Fukárek	2	3	7	7^{7}	16
(Spain) J Balcells (Netherlands) S Schalken	6	6	6
(Austria) J Knowle (Switzerland) L Manta	2	4	3
(South Africa) N Godwin (South Africa) J Weir-Smith	4	4	6	3
(Argentina) P Albano (Argentina) L Arnold Ker	6	6	1	6
(Spain) Á López Morón (Spain) A Portas	3	6^{5}	7^{7}	5
10	(Germany) D Prinosil (Czech Republic) C Suk	6	7^{7}	6^{5}	7
13	(Switzerland) R Federer (South Africa) W Ferreira	6^{6}	7	6	7
(South Africa) J Coetzee (South Africa) B Haygarth	7^{8}	5	4	5
Q	(Israel) J Erlich (Israel) A Ram	6	6	7^{7}
(South Africa) M Barnard (United States) J Thomas	4	2	6^{4}
(Italy) M Bertolini (Italy) C Brandi	6^{7}	3	6	7^{7}	7
(France) J Boutter (France) F Santoro	7^{9}	6	2	6^{4}	9
Q	(United States) J Blake (The Bahamas) M Merklein	2	6^{3}	7^{9}	4
4	(United States) D Johnson (United States) J Palmer	6	7^{7}	6^{7}	6

Second round
8	(Australia) J Eagle (Australia) A Florent	3	6^{8}	7	2
(Spain) J Balcells (Netherlands) S Schalken	6	7^{10}	5	6
(Argentina) P Albano (Argentina) L Arnold Ker	0	6	6	5	6
10	(Germany) D Prinosil (Czech Republic) C Suk	6	4	4	7	4
13	(Switzerland) R Federer (South Africa) W Ferreira	6	6	7
Q	(Israel) J Erlich (Israel) A Ram	3	4	5
(France) J Boutter (France) F Santoro	6	1	6	4	2
4	(United States) D Johnson (United States) J Palmer	3	6	3	6	6

Third round
(Spain) J Balcells (Netherlands) S Schalken	6	4	7^{7}	6
(Argentina) P Albano (Argentina) L Arnold Ker	3	6	6^{5}	4
13	(Switzerland) R Federer (South Africa) W Ferreira	w/o
4	(United States) D Johnson (United States) J Palmer

Quarterfinals
(Spain) J Balcells (Netherlands) S Schalken	6	7^{7}	6^{5}	6^{6}	4
4	(United States) D Johnson (United States) J Palmer	3	6^{5}	7^{7}	7^{8}	6

==== Section 4 ====
First round
7	(Czech Republic) P Pála (Czech Republic) P Vízner	6	6	6
(Australia) D Macpherson (South Africa) G Stafford	4	4	4
(Czech Republic) P Luxa (Czech Republic) R Štěpánek	3	7	6^{5}	6^{5}
(Spain) T Carbonell (Netherlands) J Siemerink	6	5	7^{7}	7^{7}
(Argentina) M Hood (Argentina) M Rodríguez	4	4	2
Q	(United States) K Kim (United States) G Weiner	6	6	6
WC	(United Kingdom) M Lee (United Kingdom) A Parmar	6^{4}	7^{19}	2	4
9	(Australia) M Hill (United States) J Tarango	7^{7}	6^{17}	6	6
14	(Zimbabwe) B Black (United States) A O'Brien	6	6	3	5	2
(Australia) W Arthurs (Australia) B Ellwood	3	2	6	7	6
WC	(Switzerland) M Rosset (Russia) M Safin	7^{7}	6^{3}	3	6	10
Q	(United States) B Hawk (Australia) G Silcock	6^{4}	7^{7}	6	3	8
(South Africa) R Koenig (United States) M Sprengelmeyer	4	6^{5}	5
WC	(Belarus) M Mirnyi (Belarus) V Voltchkov	6	7^{7}	7
(United States) J-M Gambill (United States) A Roddick	4	3	6^{1}
2	(Canada) D Nestor (Australia) S Stolle	6	6	7^{7}

Second round
7	(Czech Republic) P Pála (Czech Republic) P Vízner	6	7	6^{5}	7^{7}
(Spain) T Carbonell (Netherlands) J Siemerink	4	5	7^{7}	6^{3}
Q	(United States) K Kim (United States) G Weiner	4	6	3	4
9	(Australia) M Hill (United States) J Tarango	6	4	6	6
(Australia) W Arthurs (Australia) B Ellwood	6	3	6	3	4
WC	(Switzerland) M Rosset (Russia) M Safin	3	6	3	6	6
WC	(Belarus) M Mirnyi (Belarus) V Voltchkov	3	6	7	6
2	(Canada) D Nestor (Australia) S Stolle	6	2	5	3

Third round
7	(Czech Republic) P Pála (Czech Republic) P Vízner	6	6^{5}	7^{7}	6
9	(Australia) M Hill (United States) J Tarango	4	7^{7}	6^{2}	4
WC	(Switzerland) M Rosset (Russia) M Safin	3	6^{5}	6	4
WC	(Belarus) M Mirnyi (Belarus) V Voltchkov	6	7^{7}	3	6

Quarterfinals
7	(Czech Republic) P Pála (Czech Republic) P Vízner	6^{4}	7	6	4	7
WC	(Belarus) M Mirnyi (Belarus) V Voltchkov	7^{7}	5	3	6	9
