= 2002 French Open =

- Date: 27 May – 9 June 2002
- Edition: 101
- Category: 72nd Grand Slam (ITF)
- Surface: Clay
- Location: Paris (XVI^{e}), France
- Venue: Stade Roland Garros

Champions

Men's singles
- (Spain) Albert Costa

Women's singles
- (United States) Serena Williams

Men's doubles
- (Netherlands) Paul Haarhuis / (Russia) Yevgeny Kafelnikov

Women's doubles
- (Spain) Virginia Ruano Pascual / (Argentina) Paola Suárez

Mixed doubles
- (Zimbabwe) Cara Black / (Zimbabwe) Wayne Black

Boys' singles
- (France) Richard Gasquet
- French Open

The 2002 French Open was the second Grand Slam event of 2002 and the 101st edition of the French Open. It took place at the Stade Roland Garros in Paris, France, from late May through early June, 2002.

Both Gustavo Kuerten and Jennifer Capriati were unsuccessful in defending their 2001 titles; Kuerten was defeated in the fourth round by eventual champion Albert Costa, and Capriati was defeated by eventual champion Serena Williams in the semi-finals. Costa won his only major title, defeating compatriot Juan Carlos Ferrero in the final. Serena Williams defeated her sister Venus to win her second major title, her first French Open title, and the first of four consecutive majors in what was called at the time a "Serena Slam".

== Seniors ==
=== Men's singles ===
(Spain) Albert Costa defeated (Spain) Juan Carlos Ferrero, 6–1, 6–0, 4–6, 6–3

- It was Costa's 1st title of the year, and his 12th (and final) overall. It was his 1st (and only) career Grand Slam title.

=== Women's singles ===
(United States) Serena Williams defeated (United States) Venus Williams, 7–5, 6–3 (Note: It was the first all-American women's singles final since 1986 when Chris Evert beat Martina Navratilova.)

- It was Serena's 4th title of the year, and her 15th overall. It was her 2nd career major title, and her 1st French Open title.

=== Men's doubles ===
(Netherlands) Paul Haarhuis / (Russia) Yevgeny Kafelnikov defeated (The Bahamas) Mark Knowles / (Canada) Daniel Nestor, 7–5, 6–4

=== Women's doubles ===
(Spain) Virginia Ruano Pascual / (Argentina) Paola Suárez defeated (United States) Lisa Raymond / (Australia) Rennae Stubbs, 6–4, 6–2

=== Mixed doubles ===
(Zimbabwe) Cara Black / (Zimbabwe) Wayne Black defeated (Russia) Elena Bovina / (The Bahamas) Mark Knowles, 6–3, 6–3

== Juniors ==
=== Boys' singles ===
(France) Richard Gasquet (Note: Gasquet reached in the mixed doubles final in 2004 and eventually won the match.) defeated (France) Laurent Recouderc, 6–0, 6–1

=== Girls' singles ===
(Indonesia) Angelique Widjaja defeated (United States) Ashley Harkleroad, 3–6, 6–1, 6–4

=== Boys' doubles ===
(Germany) Markus Bayer / (Germany) Philipp Petzschner defeated (Australia) Ryan Henry / (Australia) Todd Reid, 7–5, 6–4

=== Girls' doubles ===
(Germany) Anna-Lena Grönefeld / (Czech Republic) Barbora Strýcová defeated (Chinese Taipei) Su-Wei Hsieh / (Russia) Svetlana Kuznetsova (Note: Kuznetsova reached in the final in 2006 before losing to Justine Henin and again in 2009, and became champion.) 7–5, 7–5

== Notes ==
Preceded by 2002 Australian Open	Grand Slams	Succeeded by 2002 Wimbledon Championships
