= 2001 Wimbledon Championships – Girls' singles =

Girls' singles
- 2001 Wimbledon Championships

Final
- Champion: (Indonesia) Angelique Widjaja
- Runner-up: (Russia) Dinara Safina
- Score: 6–4, 0–6, 7–5

Details
- Draw: 64 (8 Q / 8 WC )
- Seeds: 16

Events
Singles	men	women		boys	girls
Doubles	men	women	mixed	boys	girls
WC Singles	men	women	quad
WC Doubles	men	women	quad
Legends	men	women	seniors
← 2000 ·	Wimbledon Championships	· 2002 →

María Emilia Salerni was the defending champion but did not complete in the Juniors this year.

Angelique Widjaja defeated Dinara Safina in the final, 6–4, 0–6, 7–5 to win the girls' singles tennis title at the 2001 Wimbledon Championships.

== Seeds ==
1. (United States) Ashley Harkleroad (third round)
2. (Federal Republic of Yugoslavia) Jelena Janković (first round)
3. (Luxembourg) Claudine Schaul (third round)
4. (Russia) Svetlana Kuznetsova (quarterfinals)
5. (Czech Republic) Eva Birnerová (third round)
6. (United Kingdom) Elena Baltacha (semifinals)
7. (Argentina) Gisela Dulko (third round)
8. (Indonesia) Angelique Widjaja (champion)
9. (United Kingdom) Anne Keothavong (semifinals)
10. (France) Marion Bartoli (second round)
11. (Croatia) Matea Mezak (third round)
12. (Romania) Edina Gallovits (first round)
13. (Sweden) Sofia Arvidsson (third round)
14. (Czech Republic) Barbora Strýcová (quarterfinals)
15. (Russia) Dinara Safina (final)
16. (Australia) Monique Adamczak (second round)

Click on the seed number of a player to go to their draw section.

== Draw ==
=== Key ===
- Q = Qualifier
- WC = Wild card
- LL = Lucky loser
- Alt = Alternate
- SE = Special exempt
- PR = Protected ranking
- ITF = ITF entry
- JE = Junior exempt
- w/o = Walkover
- r = Retired
- d = Defaulted
- SR = Special ranking

=== Finals ===
Quarterfinals
14	(Czech Republic) Barbora Strýcová	1	4
8	(Indonesia) Angelique Widjaja	6	6
4	(Russia) Svetlana Kuznetsova	5	7^{7}	7
6	(United Kingdom) Elena Baltacha	7	6^{4}	9
Q	(Switzerland) Daniela Casanova	3	5
15	(Russia) Dinara Safina	6	7
9	(United Kingdom) Anne Keothavong	3	7^{7}	7
(Russia) Anna Bastrikova	6	6^{5}	5

Semifinals
8	(Indonesia) Angelique Widjaja	5	7^{7}	6
6	(United Kingdom) Elena Baltacha	7	6^{2}	2
15	(Russia) Dinara Safina	6	6
9	(United Kingdom) Anne Keothavong	2	1

Final
8	(Indonesia) Angelique Widjaja	6	0	7
15	(Russia) Dinara Safina	4	6	5

=== Top half ===
==== Section 1 ====
First round
1	(United States) Ashley Harkleroad	6	6
(Russia) Galina Voskoboeva	3	3
(Italy) Giorgia Mortello	6	6
(Mexico) Melissa Torres Sandoval	0	1
(Egypt) Yomna Farid	4	0
WC	(United Kingdom) Jane O'Donoghue	6	6
(Finland) Emma Laine	6	2	5
14	(Czech Republic) Barbora Strýcová	1	6	7
10	(France) Marion Bartoli	6	7^{7}
(Georgia (country)) Salome Devidze	2	6^{4}
(Austria) Tina Schiechtl	2	2
(Switzerland) Myriam Casanova	6	6
(South Africa) Maretha van Niekerk	3	6^{1}
(Germany) Annette Kolb	6	7^{7}
Q	(China) Peng Shuai	3	0
8	(Indonesia) Angelique Widjaja	6	6

Second round
1	(United States) A Harkleroad	6	6
(Italy) G Mortello	4	2
WC	(United Kingdom) J O'Donoghue	1	3
14	(Czech Republic) B Strýcová	6	6
10	(France) M Bartoli	4	6^{2}
(Switzerland) M Casanova	6	7^{7}
(Germany) A Kolb	5	4
8	(Indonesia) A Widjaja	7	6

Third round
1	(United States) A Harkleroad	3	2
14	(Czech Republic) B Strýcová	6	6
(Switzerland) M Casanova	4	1
8	(Indonesia) A Widjaja	6	6

Quarterfinals
14	(Czech Republic) B Strýcová	1	4
8	(Indonesia) A Widjaja	6	6

==== Section 2 ====
First round
4	(Russia) Svetlana Kuznetsova	6	6
WC	(Mexico) Erika Valdés	3	0
(Poland) Joanna Sakowicz	3	5
(Argentina) María José Argeri	6	7
(Haiti) Neyssa Etienne	1	4
(Chinese Taipei) Hsieh Su-wei	6	6
(Australia) Christina Horiatopoulos	4	4
13	(Sweden) Sofia Arvidsson	6	6
11	(Croatia) Matea Mezak	2	6	6
(Czech Republic) Petra Cetkovská	6	2	3
WC	(United Kingdom) Annabel Blow	6	6^{6}	6
(United States) Amber Liu	4	7^{8}	3
(Slovakia) Dominika Nociarová	6	7^{7}
(United States) Sunitha Rao	4	6^{2}
Q	(Slovakia) Linda Smoleňáková	6	2	2
6	(United Kingdom) Elena Baltacha	4	6	6

Second round
4	(Russia) S Kuznetsova	6	7^{7}
(Argentina) MJ Argeri	4	6^{5}
(Chinese Taipei) S-w Hsieh	0	1
13	(Sweden) S Arvidsson	6	6
11	(Croatia) M Mezak	6	7^{7}
WC	(United Kingdom) A Blow	2	6^{5}
(Slovakia) D Nociarová	3	4
6	(United Kingdom) E Baltacha	6	6

Third round
4	(Russia) S Kuznetsova	6	7^{7}
13	(Sweden) S Arvidsson	3	6^{4}
11	(Croatia) M Mezak	6	6^{6}	3
6	(United Kingdom) E Baltacha	3	7^{8}	6

Quarterfinals
4	(Russia) S Kuznetsova	5	7^{7}	7
6	(United Kingdom) E Baltacha	7	6^{4}	9

=== Bottom half ===
==== Section 3 ====
First round
7	(Argentina) Gisela Dulko	2	7	6
WC	(Federal Republic of Yugoslavia) Daniela Berček	6	5	1
(India) Sania Mirza	3	6	6
WC	(United Kingdom) Julia Smith	6	1	3
Q	(Switzerland) Daniela Casanova	6	6
(Czech Republic) Ema Janašková	2	3
(United States) Bethanie Mattek	6	6
12	(Romania) Edina Gallovits	4	2
15	(Russia) Dinara Safina	6	6
(Mexico) María José López Herrera	4	4
Q	(United States) Nicole Pitts	4	6	6
(Austria) Daniela Kix	6	4	2
(Australia) Samantha Stosur	7^{7}	6
(Chinese Taipei) Chuang Chia-jung	6^{4}	1
WC	(United Kingdom) Cristelle Grier	5	4
3	(Luxembourg) Claudine Schaul	7	6

Second round
7	(Argentina) G Dulko	6	6
(India) S Mirza	1	2
Q	(Switzerland) D Casanova	7^{7}	4	6
(United States) B Mattek	6^{3}	6	3
15	(Russia) D Safina	6	6
Q	(United States) N Pitts	2	0
(Australia) S Stosur	3	6	1
3	(Luxembourg) C Schaul	6	4	6

Third round
7	(Argentina) G Dulko	3	3
Q	(Switzerland) D Casanova	6	6
15	(Russia) D Safina	6	6
3	(Luxembourg) C Schaul	3	2

Quarterfinals
Q	(Switzerland) D Casanova	3	5
15	(Russia) D Safina	6	7

==== Section 4 ====
First round
5	(Czech Republic) Eva Birnerová	6	6
(Germany) Scarlett Werner	4	1
(Netherlands) Michelle Gerards	6	6
(United States) Jamea Jackson	3	2
(Austria) Jenny Zika	6	5	1
(Italy) Lisa Tognetti	4	7	6
Q	(United Kingdom) Katie O'Brien	1	3
9	(United Kingdom) Anne Keothavong	6	6
16/WC	(Australia) Monique Adamczak	2	7^{7}	6
WC	(United Kingdom) Alice Barnes	6	6^{3}	4
(Russia) Anna Bastrikova	7^{7}	6
(Croatia) Ana Vrljić	6^{4}	2
(Uruguay) Ana Lucía Migliarini de León	6	6
Q	(Mexico) Lourdes López	4	3
Q	(Russia) Nina Bratchikova	7^{7}	6^{3}	6
2	(Federal Republic of Yugoslavia) Jelena Janković	6^{2}	7^{7}	1

Second round
5	(Czech Republic) E Birnerová	6	3	6
(Netherlands) M Gerards	4	6	3
(Italy) L Tognetti	2	0
9	(United Kingdom) A Keothavong	6	6
16/WC	(Australia) M Adamczak	6^{6}	4
(Russia) A Bastrikova	7^{8}	6
(Uruguay) AL Migliarini de León	3	2
Q	(Russia) N Bratchikova	6	6

Third round
5	(Czech Republic) E Birnerová	6	4	4
9	(United Kingdom) A Keothavong	2	6	6
(Russia) A Bastrikova	6	7
Q	(Russia) N Bratchikova	3	5

Quarterfinals
9	(United Kingdom) A Keothavong	3	7^{7}	7
(Russia) A Bastrikova	6	6^{5}	5
