= Myles Wakefield =

South African tennis player

- Country (sports): South Africa
- Residence: Durban, South Africa
- Born: 13 June 1974 (age 51) Durban, South Africa
- Height: 1.96 m (6 ft 5 in)
- Turned pro: 1995
- Plays: Right-handed
- Prize money: $321,107

Singles
- Highest ranking: No. 590 (13 July 1998)

Doubles
- Career record: 62–85
- Career titles: 1
- Highest ranking: No. 46 (17 September 2001)

Grand Slam doubles results
- Australian Open: 2R (2000, 2001)
- French Open: 2R (2000, 2002)
- Wimbledon: 2R (2000, 2001, 2002, 2003)
- US Open: 2R (2001)

Mixed doubles

Grand Slam mixed doubles results
- Wimbledon: QF (2001)

Myles Wakefield (born 13 June 1974), is a former professional tennis player from South Africa. He enjoyed most of his tennis success while playing doubles, achieving a career-high doubles ranking of world No. 46 in 2001. In 2002 he won an ATP doubles tournament in Casablanca, partnering Stephen Huss. Won the Durban Bowling club padel tournament partnering with Shaun Leagas.

== Career finals ==
=== Doubles (1 title, 2 runner-ups) ===
Legend (doubles)
Grand Slam (0)
Tennis Masters Cup (0)
ATP Masters Series (0)
ATP Tour (1)

Result	W–L	Date	Tournament	Surface	Partner	Opponents	Score
Loss	0–1	Nov 2000	St. Petersburg, Russia	Hard (i)	(Japan) Thomas Shimada	(Canada) Daniel Nestor (Zimbabwe) Kevin Ullyett	6–7^{(5–7)}, 5–7
Loss	0–2	Mar 2001	Delray Beach, US	Hard	(Japan) Thomas Shimada	(United States) Jan-Michael Gambill (United States) Andy Roddick	3–6, 4–6
Win	1–2	Apr 2002	Casablanca, Morocco	Clay	(Australia) Stephen Huss	(Argentina) Martin Garcia (Argentina) Luis Lobo	6–4, 6–2
