= 2002 Australian Open =

- Date: 14–27 January 2002
- Edition: 90th
- Category: Grand Slam (ITF)
- Surface: Hardcourt (Rebound Ace)
- Location: Melbourne, Victoria, Australia
- Venue: Melbourne Park

Champions

Men's singles
- (Sweden) Thomas Johansson

Women's singles
- (United States) Jennifer Capriati

Men's doubles
- (The Bahamas) Mark Knowles / (Canada) Daniel Nestor

Women's doubles
- (Switzerland) Martina Hingis / (Russia) Anna Kournikova

Mixed doubles
- (Slovakia) Daniela Hantuchová / (Zimbabwe) Kevin Ullyett

Wheelchair men's singles
- (Netherlands) Robin Ammerlaan

Wheelchair women's singles
- (Netherlands) Esther Vergeer

Boys' singles
- (France) Clément Morel

Girls' singles
- (Czech Republic) Barbora Strýcová

Boys' doubles
- (Australia) Ryan Henry / (Australia) Todd Reid

Girls' doubles
- (Argentina) Gisela Dulko / (Indonesia) Angelique Widjaja
- Australian Open

The 2002 Australian Open was a tennis tournament played on outdoor hard courts at Melbourne Park in Melbourne in Australia. It was the 90th edition of the Australian Open and was held from 14 through 27 January 2002 and attracted an attendance of 518,248.

Andre Agassi and Jennifer Capriati were the defending champions. Agassi, chose to withdraw from the tournament due to wrist injury. Thomas Johansson won his first Grand Slam title, while Capriati successfully defended her title defeating three-time champion Martina Hingis in the final.

Kia Motors began its sponsorship of the Australian Open in this season replacing Ford.

== Seniors ==
=== Men's singles ===
(Sweden) Thomas Johansson defeated (Russia) Marat Safin, 3–6, 6–4, 6–4, 7–6^{(7–4)}

- It was Johansson's 1st title of the year, and his 7th overall. It was his 1st (and only) career Grand Slam title.

=== Women's singles ===
(United States) Jennifer Capriati defeated (Switzerland) Martina Hingis, 4–6, 7–6^{(9–7)}, 6–2

- It was Capriati's 1st title of the year, and her 13th overall. It was her 3rd (and last) career Grand Slam title, and her 2nd Australian Open title.

=== Men's doubles ===
(The Bahamas) Mark Knowles / (Canada) Daniel Nestor defeated (France) Michaël Llodra / (France) Fabrice Santoro, 7–6, 6–3

- Note: This is the first time where in men's doubles, a team only needs to win two sets to win a match. Previously, teams required to win three sets to win a match.

=== Women's doubles ===
(Switzerland) Martina Hingis / (Russia) Anna Kournikova defeated (Slovakia) Daniela Hantuchová / (Spain) Arantxa Sánchez Vicario, 6–2, 6–7^{(4–7)}, 6–1

=== Mixed doubles ===
(Slovakia) Daniela Hantuchová / (Zimbabwe) Kevin Ullyett defeated (Argentina) Paola Suárez / (Argentina) Gastón Etlis, 6–3, 6–2

== Juniors ==
=== Boys' singles ===
(France) Clément Morel defeated (Australia) Todd Reid, 6–4, 6–4

=== Girls' singles ===
(Czech Republic) Barbora Strýcová defeated (Russia) Maria Sharapova, 6–0, 7–5

=== Boys' doubles ===
(Australia) Ryan Henry / (Australia) Todd Reid defeated (Romania) Florin Mergea / (Romania) Horia Tecău, walkover

=== Girls' doubles ===
(Argentina) Gisela Dulko / (Indonesia) Angelique Widjaja defeated (Russia) Svetlana Kuznetsova / (Croatia) Matea Mezak, 6–2, 5–7, 6-4

== Wheelchair ==
=== Men's wheelchair singles ===
(Netherlands) Robin Ammerlaan defeated (Australia) David Hall, 6–2, 6-4

=== Women's wheelchair singles ===
(Netherlands) Esther Vergeer defeated (Australia) Daniela Di Toro, 6–2, 6–0

== Seeds ==
=== Men's singles ===
1. (Australia) Lleyton Hewitt (first round, lost to Alberto Martín)
2. (Brazil) Gustavo Kuerten (first round, lost to Julien Boutter)
3. (United States) Andre Agassi (withdrew due to wrist injury)
4. (Russia) Yevgeny Kafelnikov (second round, lost to Alex Kim)
5. (France) Sébastien Grosjean (second round, lost to Francisco Clavet)
6. (United Kingdom) Tim Henman (fourth round, lost to Jonas Björkman)
7. (Germany) Tommy Haas (semifinals, lost to Marat Safin)
8. (United States) Pete Sampras (fourth round, lost to Marat Safin)
9. (Russia) Marat Safin (finals, lost to Thomas Johansson)
10. (Croatia) Goran Ivanišević (second round, lost to Jérôme Golmard)
11. (Switzerland) Roger Federer (fourth round, lost to Tommy Haas)
12. (Argentina) Guillermo Cañas (third round, lost to Jonas Björkman)
13. (United States) Andy Roddick (second round, lost to Ivan Ljubičić)
14. (Spain) Àlex Corretja (First Round, lost to James Blake)
15. (France) Arnaud Clément (second round, lost to Gastón Gaudio)
16. (Sweden) Thomas Johansson Champion
17. (Spain) Carlos Moyá (second round, lost to Rainer Schüttler)
18. (Spain) Albert Portas (second round, lost to Dominik Hrbatý)
19. (United States) Jan-Michael Gambill (first round, lost to Wayne Ferreira)
20. (France) Fabrice Santoro (first round, lost to Mardy Fish)
21. (Morocco) Younes El Aynaoui (third round, lost to Thomas Johansson)
22. (Morocco) Hicham Arazi (second round, lost to Kristian Pless)
23. (Ecuador) Nicolás Lapentti (fourth round, lost to Marcelo Ríos)
24. (Sweden) Thomas Enqvist (second round, lost to Jonas Björkman)
25. (Romania) Andrei Pavel (third round, lost to Albert Costa)
26. (Czech Republic) Jiří Novák (semifinals, lost to Thomas Johansson)
27. (Netherlands) Sjeng Schalken (first round, lost to Karol Kučera)
28. (United Kingdom) Greg Rusedski (third round, lost to Tim Henman)
29. (Belgium) Xavier Malisse (second round, lost to Todd Martin)
30. (France) Nicolas Escudé (third round, lost to Pete Sampras)
31. (Sweden) Andreas Vinciguerra (second round, lost to Taylor Dent)
32. (Spain) Tommy Robredo (second round, lost to Fernando González)

=== Women's singles ===
1. (United States) Jennifer Capriati (champion)
2. (United States) Venus Williams (quarterfinals, lost to Monica Seles)
3. (Switzerland) Martina Hingis (final, lost to Jennifer Capriati)
4. (Belgium) Kim Clijsters (semifinals, lost to Jennifer Capriati)
5. (United States) Serena Williams (withdrew due to right ankle sprain)
6. (Belgium) Justine Henin (quarterfinals, lost to Kim Clijsters)
7. (France) Amélie Mauresmo (quarterfinals, lost to Jennifer Capriati)
8. (United States) Monica Seles (semifinals, lost to Martina Hingis)
9. (France) Sandrine Testud (first round, lost to Nathalie Dechy)
10. (United States) Meghann Shaughnessy (third round, lost to Marlene Weingärtner)
11. (Italy) Silvia Farina Elia (third round, lost to Adriana Serra Zanetti)
12. (Russia) Elena Dementieva (fourth round, lost to Justine Henin)
13. (Bulgaria) Magdalena Maleeva (fourth round, lost to Venus Williams)
14. (Spain) Arantxa Sánchez Vicario (first round, lost to Iva Majoli)
15. (South Africa) Amanda Coetzer (fourth round, lost to Martina Hingis)
16. (Uzbekistan) Iroda Tulyaganova (third round, lost to Rita Grande)
17. (Austria) Barbara Schett (third round, lost to Amanda Coetzer)
18. (United States) Lisa Raymond (third round, lost to Magdalena Maleeva)
19. (Spain) Ángeles Montolio (first round, lost to Marlene Weingärtner)
20. (Italy) Rita Grande (fourth round, lost to Jennifer Capriati)
21. (Czech Republic) Dája Bedáňová (second round, lost to Anabel Medina Garrigues)
22. (Slovakia) Henrieta Nagyová (first round, lost to Amy Frazier)
23. (Spain) Magüi Serna (third round, lost to Elena Dementieva)
24. (Japan) Ai Sugiyama (third round, lost to Janette Husárová)
25. (Thailand) Tamarine Tanasugarn (third round, lost to Amélie Mauresmo)
26. (Spain) Cristina Torrens Valero (first round, lost to Mariana Díaz Oliva)
27. (Argentina) Paola Suárez (first round, lost to Martina Müller)
28. (Luxembourg) Anne Kremer (second round, lost to Barbara Rittner)
29. (Russia) Tatiana Panova (second round, lost to Eleni Daniilidou)
30. (Russia) Elena Likhovtseva (first round, lost to Emmanuelle Gagliardi)
31. (Italy) Francesca Schiavone (third round, lost to Monica Seles)
32. (Slovakia) Daniela Hantuchová (third round, lost to Venus Williams)
33. (Russia) Lina Krasnoroutskaya (first round, lost to Conchita Martínez)

Preceded by 2001 US Open	Grand Slams	Succeeded by 2002 French Open
