= Amritraj =

Amritraj (Hindi: अमृतराज, Tamil: அமிர்தராஜ்) is a South Indian surname. It may refer to members of the tennis-playing Indian family who also represented the US and India.

- Anand Amritraj (born 1952), former Indian tennis player and businessman
- Vijay Amritraj (born 1953), former Indian tennis player, sports commentator and actor
- Ashok Amritraj (born 1956), American film producer and former Indian tennis player
- Prakash Amritraj (born 1983), American tennis player of Indian origin; son of Vijay Amritraj
- Stephen Amritraj (born 1984), American tennis player of Indian origin; son of Anand Amritraj
- Alison Riske-Amritraj (born 1990), American tennis player; wife of Stephen Amritraj
