= 2001 Wimbledon Championships – Women's doubles =

Women's doubles
- 2001 Wimbledon Championships

Final
- Champions: (United States) Lisa Raymond (Australia) Rennae Stubbs
- Runners-up: (Belgium) Kim Clijsters (Japan) Ai Sugiyama
- Score: 6–4, 6–3
- Date: 8 July 2001 (Note: Originally scheduled for 7 July, but was postponed to one day due to unfinished matches to rain.)

Details
- Draw: 64 (4Q / 4WC)
- Seeds: 16

Events
Singles	men	women		boys	girls
Doubles	men	women	mixed	boys	girls
WC Singles	men	women	quad
WC Doubles	men	women	quad
Legends	men	women	seniors
- Wimbledon Championships

Serena and Venus Williams were the defending champions but withdrew in the third round.

Lisa Raymond and Rennae Stubbs defeated Kim Clijsters and Ai Sugiyama in the final, 6–4, 6–3 to win the ladies' doubles tennis title at the 2001 Wimbledon Championships.

== Seeds ==
1. (United States) Lisa Raymond / (Australia) Rennae Stubbs (champions)
2. (Spain) Virginia Ruano Pascual / (Argentina) Paola Suárez (semifinals)
3. (Zimbabwe) Cara Black / (Russia) Elena Likhovtseva (second round)
4. (United States) Serena Williams / (United States) Venus Williams (third round, withdrew)
5. (United States) Kimberly Po-Messerli / (France) Nathalie Tauziat (semifinals)
6. (Belgium) Els Callens / (United States) Meghann Shaughnessy (first round)
7. (Federal Republic of Yugoslavia) Jelena Dokić / (Spain) Conchita Martínez (third round)
8. (United States) Nicole Arendt / (Netherlands) Caroline Vis (second round)
9. (Belgium) Kim Clijsters / (Japan) Ai Sugiyama (final)
10. (France) Alexandra Fusai / (Italy) Rita Grande (second round)
11. (Australia) Nicole Pratt / (Ukraine) Elena Tatarkova (first round)
12. (Italy) Tathiana Garbin / (Slovakia) Janette Husárová (third round)
13. (Germany) Anke Huber / (Austria) Barbara Schett (first round)
14. (South Africa) Amanda Coetzer / (United States) Lori McNeil (third round)
15. (Slovenia) Tina Križan / (Slovenia) Katarina Srebotnik (second round)
16. (United States) Martina Navratilova / (Spain) Arantxa Sánchez Vicario (quarterfinals)

Click on the seed number of a player to go to their draw section.

== Draw ==
Key

- Q = Qualifier
- WC = Wild card
- LL = Lucky loser
- Alt = Alternate
- ITF = ITF entry
- PR = Protected ranking
- SR = Special ranking
- SE = Special exempt
- JE = Junior exempt
- JR = Junior Accelerator Programme entrant
- CO = College Accelerator Programme entrant
- NG = Next Gen Accelerator Program entrant
- w/o = Walkover
- r = Retired
- d = Defaulted

=== Finals ===
Quarterfinals
1	(United States) Lisa Raymond (Australia) Rennae Stubbs	6	6
(Croatia) Iva Majoli (Slovakia) Henrieta Nagyová	3	2
16	(United States) Martina Navratilova (Spain) Arantxa Sánchez Vicario	6	4	3
5	(United States) Kimberly Po-Messerli (France) Nathalie Tauziat	4	6	6
9	(Belgium) Kim Clijsters (Japan) Ai Sugiyama	6	6
(Australia) Rachel McQuillan (Australia) Lisa McShea	2	2
Q	(Slovenia) Maja Matevžič (Federal Republic of Yugoslavia) Dragana Zarić	4	4
2	(Spain) Virginia Ruano Pascual (Argentina) Paola Suárez	6	6

Semifinals
1	(United States) Lisa Raymond (Australia) Rennae Stubbs	6	7
5	(United States) Kimberly Po-Messerli (France) Nathalie Tauziat	3	5
9	(Belgium) Kim Clijsters (Japan) Ai Sugiyama	6	6
2	(Spain) Virginia Ruano Pascual (Argentina) Paola Suárez	4	4

Final
1	(United States) Lisa Raymond (Australia) Rennae Stubbs	6	6
9	(Belgium) Kim Clijsters (Japan) Ai Sugiyama	4	3

=== Top half ===
==== Section 1 ====
First round
1	(United States) L Raymond (Australia) R Stubbs	6	7
(Japan) S Asagoe (Japan) Y Yoshida	0	5
(Japan) R Hiraki (India) N Vaidyanathan	6	6
(Italy) S Farina Elia (Uzbekistan) I Tulyaganova	2	4
WC	(United Kingdom) E Baltacha (United Kingdom) N Trinder	6	3	2
(Spain) E Bes (Belarus) T Poutchek	3	6	6
(South Africa) N de Villiers (Australia) A Ellwood	6	4	3
14	(South Africa) A Coetzer (United States) L McNeil	3	6	6
12	(Italy) T Garbin (Slovakia) J Husárová	6	4	6
(United States) E deLone (Canada) S Jeyaseelan	3	6	3
(Belgium) L Courtois (Russia) L Krasnoroutskaya	6	6
Q	(United States) A Augustus (United States) J Embry	2	1
(Croatia) I Majoli (Slovakia) H Nagyová	6	6
(Hungary) P Mandula (Austria) P Wartusch	4	2
(Germany) B Lamade (Switzerland) P Schnyder	6	3	12
6	(Belgium) E Callens (United States) M Shaughnessy	4	6	10

Second round
1	(United States) L Raymond (Australia) R Stubbs	6	6
(Japan) R Hiraki (India) N Vaidyanathan	1	1
(Spain) E Bes (Belarus) T Poutchek	6	2	2
14	(South Africa) A Coetzer (United States) L McNeil	1	6	6
12	(Italy) T Garbin (Slovakia) J Husárová	6	6
(Belgium) L Courtois (Russia) L Krasnoroutskaya	2	3
(Croatia) I Majoli (Slovakia) H Nagyová	6	6
(Germany) B Lamade (Switzerland) P Schnyder	2	4

Third round
1	(United States) L Raymond (Australia) R Stubbs	6	6
14	(South Africa) A Coetzer (United States) L McNeil	2	2
12	(Italy) T Garbin (Slovakia) J Husárová	6^{5}	3
(Croatia) I Majoli (Slovakia) H Nagyová	7^{7}	6

Quarterfinals
1	(United States) L Raymond (Australia) R Stubbs	6	6
(Croatia) I Majoli (Slovakia) H Nagyová	3	2

==== Section 2 ====
First round
4	(United States) S Williams (United States) V Williams	6	6
(Argentina) ME Salerni (Argentina) P Tarabini	1	1
WC	(United States) J Hopkins (United Kingdom) L Latimer	6	1	2
(France) N Dechy (France) A Mauresmo	3	6	6
(Indonesia) Y Basuki (Japan) N Miyagi	7^{7}	2	6
(United Kingdom) J Pullin (United Kingdom) L Woodroffe	6^{5}	6	4
(Italy) G Casoni (Federal Republic of Yugoslavia) S Načuk	0	1
16	(United States) M Navratilova (Spain) A Sánchez Vicario	6	6
10	(France) A Fusai (Italy) R Grande	6	6
WC	(United Kingdom) H Crook (United Kingdom) V Davies	2	2
(Spain) MJ Martínez Sánchez (Spain) A Medina Garrigues	7	3	6
(Russia) N Petrova (Slovenia) T Pisnik	5	6	8
(Russia) A Jidkova (United States) M Tu	3	6^{3}
(France) C Dhenin (Argentina) M Díaz Oliva	6	7^{7}
(Australia) T Musgrave (Kazakhstan) I Selyutina	2	5
5	(United States) K Po-Messerli (France) N Tauziat	6	7

Second round
4	(United States) S Williams (United States) V Williams	6	6
(France) N Dechy (France) A Mauresmo	3	3
(Indonesia) Y Basuki (Japan) N Miyagi	5	1
16	(United States) M Navratilova (Spain) A Sánchez Vicario	7	6
10	(France) A Fusai (Italy) R Grande	6	4	4
(Russia) N Petrova (Slovenia) T Pisnik	4	6	6
(France) C Dhenin (Argentina) M Díaz Oliva	3	1
5	(United States) K Po-Messerli (France) N Tauziat	6	6

Third round
4	(United States) S Williams (United States) V Williams	w/o
16	(United States) M Navratilova (Spain) A Sánchez Vicario
(Russia) N Petrova (Slovenia) T Pisnik	3	3
5	(United States) K Po-Messerli (France) N Tauziat	6	6

Quarterfinals
16	(United States) M Navratilova (Spain) A Sánchez Vicario	6	4	3
5	(United States) K Po-Messerli (France) N Tauziat	4	6	6

=== Bottom half ===
==== Section 3 ====
First round
7	(Federal Republic of Yugoslavia) J Dokić (Spain) C Martínez	4	6	6
(Romania) R Dragomir Ilie (Germany) A Glass	6	0	0
(France) É Loit (France) A-G Sidot	6	6
WC	(United Kingdom) L Ahl (United Kingdom) H Collin	3	2
(France) S Testud (France) V Razzano	6	6
(South Africa) K Grant (Germany) M Weingärtner	1	3
(Chinese Taipei) J Lee (Indonesia) W Prakusya	4	3
9	(Belgium) K Clijsters (Japan) A Sugiyama	6	6
15	(Slovenia) T Križan (Slovenia) K Srebotnik	6	6
(Germany) A Bachmann (Austria) B Schwartz	2	4
(Slovakia) J Husárová (Slovakia) D Hantuchová	6	4	6
(Bulgaria) L Bacheva (Spain) C Torrens Valero	3	6	1
(Australia) R McQuillan (Australia) L McShea	6	7^{7}
(Canada) R Kolbovic (United States) L Osterloh	2	6^{5}
(Denmark) E Dyrberg (Hungary) K Marosi-Aracama	4	2
3	(Zimbabwe) C Black (Russia) E Likhovtseva	6	6

Second round
7	(Federal Republic of Yugoslavia) J Dokić (Spain) C Martínez	6	6^{5}	6
(France) É Loit (France) A-G Sidot	4	7^{7}	4
(France) S Testud (France) V Razzano	3	6^{4}
9	(Belgium) K Clijsters (Japan) A Sugiyama	6	7^{7}
15	(Slovenia) T Križan (Slovenia) K Srebotnik	4	6	4
(Slovakia) J Husárová (Slovakia) D Hantuchová	6	3	6
(Australia) R McQuillan (Australia) L McShea	6	6
3	(Zimbabwe) C Black (Russia) E Likhovtseva	3	4

Third round
7	(Federal Republic of Yugoslavia) J Dokić (Spain) C Martínez	2	7	3
9	(Belgium) K Clijsters (Japan) A Sugiyama	6	5	6
(Slovakia) J Husárová (Slovakia) D Hantuchová	5	4
(Australia) R McQuillan (Australia) L McShea	7	6

Quarterfinals
9	(Belgium) K Clijsters (Japan) A Sugiyama	6	6
(Australia) R McQuillan (Australia) L McShea	2	2

==== Section 4 ====
First round
8	(United States) N Arendt (Netherlands) C Vis	6	6
Q	(Czech Republic) E Martincová (Ukraine) T Perebiynis	3	4
(Australia) K-A Guse (Australia) A Molik	7^{7}	6^{3}	4
Q	(Slovenia) M Matevžič (Federal Republic of Yugoslavia) D Zarić	6^{2}	7^{7}	6
(Sweden) Å Carlsson (Bulgaria) M Maleeva	7	5	3
(Belgium) J Henin (Spain) M Serna	5	7	6
(Netherlands) K Boogert (Netherlands) M Oremans	7	6
11	(Australia) N Pratt (Ukraine) E Tatarkova	5	4
13	(Germany) A Huber (Austria) B Schett	4	4
(Germany) B Rittner (Venezuela) M Vento	6	6
(Switzerland) E Gagliardi (Italy) L Golarsa	6^{2}	7^{7}	2
Q	(United States) D Buth (South Africa) N Grandin	7^{7}	6^{4}	6
(United States) A Frazier (United States) K Schlukebir	6	6
(South Africa) L Huber (Argentina) L Montalvo	3	4
(Austria) S Plischke (Canada) V Webb	3	0
2	(Spain) V Ruano Pascual (Argentina) P Suárez	6	6

Second round
8	(United States) N Arendt (Netherlands) C Vis	3	6	3
Q	(Slovenia) M Matevžič (Federal Republic of Yugoslavia) D Zarić	6	4	6
(Belgium) J Henin (Spain) M Serna	6	6
(Netherlands) K Boogert (Netherlands) M Oremans	2	4
(Germany) B Rittner (Venezuela) M Vento	6	6
Q	(United States) D Buth (South Africa) N Grandin	1	1
(United States) A Frazier (United States) K Schlukebir	5	4
2	(Spain) V Ruano Pascual (Argentina) P Suárez	7	6

Third round
Q	(Slovenia) M Matevžič (Federal Republic of Yugoslavia) D Zarić
(Belgium) J Henin (Spain) M Serna	w/o
(Germany) B Rittner (Venezuela) M Vento	3	6	1
2	(Spain) V Ruano Pascual (Argentina) P Suárez	6	3	6

Quarterfinals
Q	(Slovenia) M Matevžič (Federal Republic of Yugoslavia) D Zarić	4	4
2	(Spain) V Ruano Pascual (Argentina) P Suárez	6	6
