= 2001 Wimbledon Championships – Girls' doubles =

Girls' doubles
- 2001 Wimbledon Championships

Final
- Champions: (Argentina) Gisela Dulko (United States) Ashley Harkleroad
- Runners-up: (Australia) Christina Horiatopoulos (United States) Bethanie Mattek
- Score: 6–3, 6–1

Events
Singles	men	women		boys	girls
Doubles	men	women	mixed	boys	girls
WC Singles	men	women	quad
WC Doubles	men	women	quad
Legends	men	women	seniors
← 2000 ·	Wimbledon Championships	· 2002 →

Ioana Gaspar and Tatiana Perebiynis were the defending champions, but they did not compete in the Juniors this year.

Gisela Dulko and Ashley Harkleroad defeated Christina Horiatopoulos and Bethanie Mattek in the final, 6–3, 6–1 to win the girls' doubles tennis title at the 2001 Wimbledon Championships.

== Seeds ==
1. (Czech Republic) Eva Birnerová / (Czech Republic) Petra Cetkovská (quarterfinals)
2. (Mexico) Melissa Torres Sandoval / (Indonesia) Angelique Widjaja (quarterfinals)
3. (Argentina) Gisela Dulko / (United States) Ashley Harkleroad (champions)
4. (Chinese Taipei) Chuang Chia-jung / (Chinese Taipei) Hsieh Su-wei (second round)
5. (Haiti) Neyssa Etienne / (Germany) Annette Kolb (second round)
6. (Georgia (country)) Salome Devidze / (Russia) Galina Voskoboeva (first round)
7. (Federal Republic of Yugoslavia) Jelena Janković / (Croatia) Matea Mezak (semifinals)
8. (Russia) Anna Bastrikova / (Russia) Dinara Safina (semifinals)

== Draw ==
=== Key ===
- Q = Qualifier
- WC = Wild card
- LL = Lucky loser
- Alt = Alternate
- SE = Special exempt
- PR = Protected ranking
- ITF = ITF entry
- JE = Junior exempt
- w/o = Walkover
- r = Retired
- d = Defaulted
- SR = Special ranking

=== Finals ===
Semifinals
(Australia) Christina Horiatopoulos (United States) Bethanie Mattek	6	6
7	(Federal Republic of Yugoslavia) Jelena Janković (Croatia) Matea Mezak	3	3
3	(Argentina) Gisela Dulko (United States) Ashley Harkleroad	4	6	6
8	(Russia) Anna Bastrikova (Russia) Dinara Safina	6	4	4

Final
(Australia) Christina Horiatopoulos (United States) Bethanie Mattek	3	1
3	(Argentina) Gisela Dulko (United States) Ashley Harkleroad	6	6

=== Top half ===
First round
1	(Czech Republic) Eva Birnerová (Czech Republic) Petra Cetkovská	6	4	6
(Czech Republic) Barbora Strýcová (Croatia) Ana Vrljić	1	6	4
(Ukraine) Tetiana Luzhanska (Italy) Lisa Tognetti	4	4
(United Kingdom) Annabel Blow (Netherlands) Dominique van Boekel	6	6
WC	(United Kingdom) Elena Baltacha (United Kingdom) Anne Keothavong	w/o
(United States) Amber Liu (South Africa) Maretha van Niekerk
(Australia) Christina Horiatopoulos (United States) Bethanie Mattek	6	6
6	(Georgia (country)) Salome Devidze (Russia) Galina Voskoboeva	2	2
4	(Chinese Taipei) Chuang Chia-jung (Chinese Taipei) Hsieh Su-wei	6	6
(India) Sania Mirza (Mexico) Erika Valdés	4	0
(Australia) Monique Adamczak (Australia) Samantha Stosur	6	6
(France) Marion Bartoli (Italy) Giorgia Mortello	3	3
(United States) Tanner Cochran (United States) Sunitha Rao	5	4
(Federal Republic of Yugoslavia) Daniela Berček (Mexico) Lourdes López	7	6
(United Kingdom) Helen Broome (United Kingdom) Emily Webley-Smith	3	0
7	(Federal Republic of Yugoslavia) Jelena Janković (Croatia) Matea Mezak	6	6

Second round
1	(Czech Republic) E Birnerová (Czech Republic) P Cetkovská	6	6
(United Kingdom) A Blow (Netherlands) D van Boekel	4	4
(United States) A Liu (South Africa) M van Niekerk	1	4
(Australia) C Horiatopoulos (United States) B Mattek	6	6
4	(Chinese Taipei) C-j Chuang (Chinese Taipei) S-w Hsieh	6^{4}	5
(Australia) M Adamczak (Australia) S Stosur	7^{7}	7
(Federal Republic of Yugoslavia) D Berček (Mexico) L López	2	1
7	(Federal Republic of Yugoslavia) J Janković (Croatia) M Mezak	6	6

Quarterfinals
1	(Czech Republic) E Birnerová (Czech Republic) P Cetkovská	1	5
(Australia) C Horiatopoulos (United States) B Mattek	6	7
(Australia) M Adamczak (Australia) S Stosur	4	6^{2}
7	(Federal Republic of Yugoslavia) J Janković (Croatia) M Mezak	6	7^{7}

Semifinals
(Australia) C Horiatopoulos (United States) B Mattek	6	6
7	(Federal Republic of Yugoslavia) J Janković (Croatia) M Mezak	3	3

=== Bottom half ===
First round
5	(Haiti) Neyssa Etienne (Germany) Annette Kolb	6	2	6
(Uruguay) Ana Lucía Migliarini de León (Austria) Jenny Zika	1	6	2
(United Kingdom) Cristelle Grier (United Kingdom) Julia Smith	6	6
(Slovakia) Dominika Nociarová (Slovakia) Linda Smoleňáková	2	2
(Egypt) Yomna Farid (Bulgaria) Maria Penkova	2	2
(United Kingdom) Anna Hawkins (United Kingdom) Jane O'Donoghue	6	6
(Russia) Svetlana Kuznetsova (Luxembourg) Claudine Schaul	6^{5}	1
3	(Argentina) Gisela Dulko (United States) Ashley Harkleroad	7^{7}	6
8	(Russia) Anna Bastrikova (Russia) Dinara Safina	7^{7}	6
(Argentina) María José Argeri (Austria) Daniela Kix	6^{5}	4
(Sweden) Sofia Arvidsson (Czech Republic) Ema Janašková	6^{4}	7^{7}	4
(United Kingdom) Alice Barnes (Netherlands) Michelle Gerards	7^{7}	6^{4}	6
(United States) Jamea Jackson (United States) Nicole Pitts	2	4
(Russia) Nina Bratchikova (China) Peng Shuai	6	6
WC	(United Kingdom) Rebecca Llewellyn (United Kingdom) Katie O'Brien	1	2
2	(Mexico) Melissa Torres Sandoval (Indonesia) Angelique Widjaja	6	6

Second round
5	(Haiti) N Etienne (Germany) A Kolb	6	5	3
(United Kingdom) C Grier (United Kingdom) J Smith	2	7	6
(United Kingdom) A Hawkins (United Kingdom) J O'Donoghue	2	4
3	(Argentina) G Dulko (United States) A Harkleroad	6	6
8	(Russia) A Bastrikova (Russia) D Safina	3	7^{9}	9
(United Kingdom) A Barnes (Netherlands) M Gerards	6	6^{7}	7
(Russia) N Bratchikova (China) S Peng	5	7^{7}	3
2	(Mexico) M Torres Sandoval (Indonesia) A Widjaja	7	6^{3}	6

Quarterfinals
(United Kingdom) C Grier (United Kingdom) J Smith	5	1
3	(Argentina) G Dulko (United States) A Harkleroad	7	6
8	(Russia) A Bastrikova (Russia) D Safina	6	6
2	(Mexico) M Torres Sandoval (Indonesia) A Widjaja	4	2

Semifinals
3	(Argentina) G Dulko (United States) A Harkleroad	4	6	6
8	(Russia) A Bastrikova (Russia) D Safina	6	4	4
