= 2004 Canada Masters – Singles =

Singles
- 2004 Canada Masters

Final
- Champion: (Switzerland) Roger Federer
- Runner-up: (United States) Andy Roddick
- Score: 7–5, 6–3

Details
- Draw: 64 (4WC/8Q/2LL)
- Seeds: 16

Events
Singles	Doubles
- Canadian Open

Roger Federer defeated the defending champion Andy Roddick in the final, 7–5, 6–3 to win the men's singles tennis title at the 2004 Canadian Open.

== Seeds ==
1. (Switzerland) Roger Federer (champion)
2. (United States) Andy Roddick (final)
3. (Argentina) Guillermo Coria (first round, retired due to a shoulder injury)
4. (Spain) Carlos Moyá (third round)
5. (United Kingdom) Tim Henman (second round)
6. (Argentina) David Nalbandian (first round)
7. (Spain) Juan Carlos Ferrero (first round, retired)
8. (Germany) Rainer Schüttler (first round)
9. (Australia) Lleyton Hewitt (third round)
10. (United States) Andre Agassi (second round)
11. (Argentina) Gastón Gaudio (first round)
12. (France) Sébastien Grosjean (first round)
13. (Chile) Nicolás Massú (first round)
14. (Thailand) Paradorn Srichaphan (second round)
15. (Russia) Marat Safin (first round)
16. (Argentina) Juan Ignacio Chela (third round)

== Draw ==
Key

- Q = Qualifier
- WC = Wild card
- LL = Lucky loser
- Alt = Alternate
- ITF = ITF entry
- PR = Protected ranking
- SR = Special ranking
- SE = Special exempt
- JE = Junior exempt
- JR = Junior Accelerator Programme entrant
- CO = College Accelerator Programme entrant
- NG = Next Gen Accelerator Program entrant
- w/o = Walkover
- r = Retired
- d = Defaulted

=== Finals ===
Quarterfinals
1	(Switzerland) Roger Federer	7	6
(France) Fabrice Santoro	5	4
LL	(Sweden) Thomas Johansson	6	7
(Sweden) Joachim Johansson	3	6^{5}
(Austria) Jürgen Melzer	6	1	1
(Germany) Nicolas Kiefer	3	6	6
Q	(Czech Republic) Jan Hernych	4	2
2	(United States) Andy Roddick	6	6

Semifinals
1	(Switzerland) Roger Federer	4	6	6
LL	(Sweden) Thomas Johansson	6	3	2
(Germany) Nicolas Kiefer	5	3
2	(United States) Andy Roddick	7	6

Final
1	(Switzerland) Roger Federer	7	6
2	(United States) Andy Roddick	5	3

=== Top half ===
==== Section 1 ====
First round
1	(Switzerland) R Federer	6	7
(Morocco) H Arazi	3	5
(Sweden) R Söderling	7	6
(Sweden) T Enqvist	6^{2}	3
(Belarus) M Mirnyi	7	7
Q	(Switzerland) M Kratochvil	6^{6}	6^{9}
(Romania) A Pavel	5	2
14	(Thailand) P Srichaphan	7	6
9	(Australia) L Hewitt	1	6	6
(Spain) R Nadal	6	4	2
(Sweden) J Björkman	7	6^{10}	0
(Czech Republic) J Novák	5	7	6
Q	(Slovakia) K Beck	2	7	3
(Croatia) I Ljubičić	6	5	6
(France) F Santoro	3
7	(Spain) JC Ferrero	2	r

Second round
1	(Switzerland) R Federer	7	6
(Sweden) R Söderling	5	1
(Belarus) M Mirnyi	3	6	6
14	(Thailand) P Srichaphan	6	1	4
9	(Australia) L Hewitt	6	6
(Czech Republic) J Novák	2	1
(Croatia) I Ljubičić	4	6^{4}
(France) F Santoro	6	7

Third round
1	(Switzerland) R Federer	7	7
(Belarus) M Mirnyi	6^{3}	6^{4}
9	(Australia) L Hewitt	6	3	4
(France) F Santoro	2	6	6

Quarterfinals
1	(Switzerland) R Federer	7	6
(France) F Santoro	5	4

==== Section 2 ====
First round
3	(Argentina) G Coria	1	r
(Peru) L Horna	5
(Spain) D Sánchez	1	4
WC	(Canada) F Niemeyer	6	6
(Russia) I Andreev	7	6^{1}	6
(Armenia) S Sargsian	5	7	2
LL	(Sweden) T Johansson	6	6
13	(Chile) N Massú	4	4
12	(France) S Grosjean	2	6^{3}
(France) G Carraz	6	7
Q	(France) M Llodra	6	6^{4}	1
(Sweden) J Johansson	1	7	6
LL	(France) C Saulnier	6	6
WC	(Canada) D Nestor	3	4
(Russia) M Youzhny	3	6	6
6	(Argentina) D Nalbandian	6	3	4

Second round
(Peru) L Horna	6^{5}	7	6
WC	(Canada) F Niemeyer	7	5	3
(Russia) I Andreev	6^{4}	1
LL	(Sweden) T Johansson	7	6
(France) G Carraz	6^{4}	7	6^{4}
(Sweden) J Johansson	7	6^{3}	7
LL	(France) C Saulnier	4	6	7
(Russia) M Youzhny	6	3	6^{0}

Third round
(Peru) L Horna	6	5	1
LL	(Sweden) T Johansson	3	7	6
(Sweden) J Johansson	7	4	7
LL	(France) C Saulnier	6^{2}	6	6^{4}

Quarterfinals
LL	(Sweden) T Johansson	6	7
(Sweden) J Johansson	3	6^{5}

=== Bottom half ===
==== Section 3 ====
First round
8	(Germany) R Schüttler	6	4	3
(Chile) F González	3	6	6
(United States) V Spadea	6	6
WC	(Canada) F Dancevic	1	4
(Slovakia) D Hrbatý	6	5	6^{3}
(Austria) J Melzer	4	7	7
(Germany) T Haas	6	4	4
10	(United States) A Agassi	4	6	6
15	(Russia) M Safin	7	4	6^{2}
(Germany) N Kiefer	6^{3}	6	7
WC	(Canada) S Larose	5	2
(Spain) D Ferrer	7	6
Q	(United States) A Bogomolov, Jr.	6	7
(Croatia) I Karlović	4	6^{6}
(Spain) F Verdasco	7	3	4
4	(Spain) C Moyá	6^{9}	6	6

Second round
(Chile) F González	7	6
(United States) V Spadea	5	4
(Austria) J Melzer	6	6
10	(United States) A Agassi	3	3
(Germany) N Kiefer	6	6
(Spain) D Ferrer	3	1
Q	(United States) A Bogomolov, Jr.	4	3
4	(Spain) C Moyá	6	6

Third round
(Chile) F González	3	3
(Austria) J Melzer	6	6
(Germany) N Kiefer	6	2	6
4	(Spain) C Moyá	4	6	4

Quarterfinals
(Austria) J Melzer	6	1	1
(Germany) N Kiefer	3	6	6

==== Section 4 ====
First round
5	(United Kingdom) T Henman	6	6
(Argentina) M Zabaleta	4	1
(Brazil) G Kuerten	6	6
(United States) R Ginepri	1	4
(Georgia (country)) I Labadze	1	4
Q	(Czech Republic) J Hernych	6	6
Q	(Australia) T Reid	7	5	6
11	(Argentina) G Gaudio	6^{2}	7	3
16	(Argentina) JI Chela	6	5	6
(Belgium) X Malisse	3	7	3
Q	(South Korea) H-t Lee	6^{3}	1
(Spain) T Robredo	7	6
(France) N Escudé	6^{1}	2
(Spain) F López	7	6
Q	(France) J Benneteau	4	2
2	(United States) A Roddick	6	6

Second round
5	(United Kingdom) T Henman	5	4
(Brazil) G Kuerten	7	6
Q	(Czech Republic) J Hernych	6	6
Q	(Australia) T Reid	3	3
16	(Argentina) JI Chela	6	6
(Spain) T Robredo	4	0
(Spain) F López	3	6^{5}
2	(United States) A Roddick	6	7

Third round
(Brazil) G Kuerten	7	6^{6}	4
Q	(Czech Republic) J Hernych	5	7	6
16	(Argentina) JI Chela	1	4
2	(United States) A Roddick	6	6

Quarterfinals
Q	(Czech Republic) J Hernych	4	2
2	(United States) A Roddick	6	6

== Qualifying ==
=== Qualifying seeds ===
1. (France) Michaël Llodra (qualified)
2. (Slovakia) Karol Beck (qualified)
3. (France) Cyril Saulnier (qualifying competition, lucky loser)
4. (France) Julien Benneteau (qualified)
5. (South Korea) Lee Hyung-taik (qualified)
6. (Chinese Taipei) Lu Yen-hsun (first round)
7. (Sweden) Thomas Johansson (qualifying competition, lucky loser)
8. (France) Thierry Ascione (first round)
9. (Czech Republic) Jan Hernych (qualified)
10. (Ecuador) Nicolás Lapentti (first round)
11. (United States) Alex Bogomolov Jr. (qualified)
12. (United States) Glenn Weiner (qualifying competition)
13. (Australia) Todd Reid (qualified)
14. (Israel) Harel Levy (qualifying competition)
15. (United States) Jeff Salzenstein (first round)
16. (France) Julien Jeanpierre (qualifying competition)

=== Qualifiers ===
1. (France) Michaël Llodra
2. (Slovakia) Karol Beck
3. (United States) Alex Bogomolov Jr.
4. (France) Julien Benneteau
5. (South Korea) Lee Hyung-taik
6. (Switzerland) Michel Kratochvil
7. (Czech Republic) Jan Hernych
8. (Australia) Todd Reid

=== Lucky losers ===
1. (France) Cyril Saulnier
2. (Sweden) Thomas Johansson

=== Qualifying draw ===
==== First qualifier ====
First round
1	(France) Michaël Llodra	6^{4}	6	6
(South Africa) Rik de Voest	7^{7}	3	4
WC	(Canada) Dejan Cvetkovic	0	5
16	(France) Julien Jeanpierre	6	7

Qualifying competition
1	(France) Michaël Llodra	6	6
16	(France) Julien Jeanpierre	4	2

==== Second qualifier ====
First round
2	(Slovakia) Karol Beck	2	6	6
(Belgium) Dick Norman	6	3	3
(Switzerland) Marco Chiudinelli	4	6^{5}
12	(United States) Glenn Weiner	6	7^{7}

Qualifying competition
2	(Slovakia) Karol Beck	6	7
12	(United States) Glenn Weiner	1	5

==== Third qualifier ====
First round
3	(France) Cyril Saulnier	6	7
WC	(Canada) Sanjin Sadovich	3	5
(Serbia and Montenegro) Nenad Zimonjić	1	4
11	(United States) Alex Bogomolov Jr.	6	6

Qualifying competition
3	(France) Cyril Saulnier	6	4	4
11	(United States) Alex Bogomolov Jr.	3	6	6

==== Fourth qualifier ====
First round
4	(France) Julien Benneteau	6	6
WC	(Canada) Andrew Piotrowski	3	1
(Austria) Julian Knowle	3	6^{4}
14	(Israel) Harel Levy	6	7^{7}

Qualifying competition
4	(France) Julien Benneteau	6	7
14	(Israel) Harel Levy	3	5

==== Fifth qualifier ====
First round
5	(South Korea) Lee Hyung-taik	2	6	6
(Chinese Taipei) Wang Yeu-tzuoo	6	4	3
(Israel) Noam Okun	7^{7}	6
15	(United States) Jeff Salzenstein	6^{4}	3

Qualifying competition
5	(South Korea) Lee Hyung-taik	6	6
(Israel) Noam Okun	4	3

==== Sixth qualifier ====
First round
6	(Chinese Taipei) Lu Yen-hsun	1	6^{2}
(Switzerland) Michel Kratochvil	6	7^{7}
(France) Sébastien de Chaunac	5	6	6
10	(Ecuador) Nicolás Lapentti	7	3	3

Qualifying competition
(Switzerland) Michel Kratochvil	6	6
(France) Sébastien de Chaunac	3	2

==== Seventh qualifier ====
First round
7	(Sweden) Thomas Johansson	5
(Argentina) Gastón Etlis	1^{r}
(Israel) Andy Ram	0	7^{7}	1
9	(Czech Republic) Jan Hernych	6	6^{1}	6

Qualifying competition
7	(Sweden) Thomas Johansson	4	7^{8}	6^{3}
9	(Czech Republic) Jan Hernych	6	6^{6}	7^{7}

==== Eighth qualifier ====
First round
8	(France) Thierry Ascione	5	6^{3}
(United Kingdom) Arvind Parmar	7	7^{7}
WC	(Canada) Philip Gubenco	3	4
13	(Australia) Todd Reid	6	6

Qualifying competition
(United Kingdom) Arvind Parmar	3	4
13	(Australia) Todd Reid	6	6
