= Antonio Ruiz-Rosales =

Mexican tennis player (born 1984)

- Country (sports): Mexico
- Born: 18 September 1984 (age 41) Monterrey, Mexico
- Height: 1.95 m (6 ft 5 in)
- Plays: Right-handed (two-handed backhand)
- Prize money: $27,191

Singles
- Career record: 0–0 (at ATP Tour level, Grand Slam level, and in Davis Cup)
- Career titles: 0 ITF
- Highest ranking: No. 652 (15 December 2008)

Doubles
- Career record: 0–1 (at ATP Tour level, Grand Slam level, and in Davis Cup)
- Career titles: 7 ITF
- Highest ranking: No. 473 (12 October 2009)
- Last updated on: 2 October 2017.

Antonio Ruiz-Rosales (born 18 September 1984) is a Mexican tennis player.

Ruiz-Rosales has a career high ATP singles ranking of 652 achieved on 15 December 2008. He also has a career high ATP doubles ranking of 473 achieved on 12 October 2009.

Ruiz-Rosales represents Mexico at the Davis Cup, where he has a W/L record of 0–1.
