= Roman Valent =

Swiss tennis player

- Country (sports): Switzerland
- Residence: Adliswil, Switzerland
- Born: 8 July 1983 (age 41); Zürich, Switzerland
- Height: 1.83 m (6 ft 0 in)
- Turned pro: 2001
- Plays: Right-handed (two-handed backhand)
- Coach: Pavel Daron, Dario Camenzind
- Prize money: $60,375

Singles
- Career record: 0–1
- Career titles: 0
- Highest ranking: No. 300 (10 February 2003)

Doubles
- Career record: 0–1
- Career titles: 0
- Highest ranking: No. 408 (3 November 2003)

Roman Valent (born 8 July 1983) is a former professional tennis player from Switzerland. As a junior, he was coached by Pavel Daron, former sparring partner of Martina Hingis. Valent was ranked as high as world number 3 as a junior, having won the 2001 Wimbledon Boys' Singles tournament.

He has played in many Challenger and Futures tournaments, winning two of the latter. In 2003 Valent reached a career high ranking of 300 after having broken into top 500 just a year before.

In the following years, Valent was set back by serious injuries to his shoulder or knee as well as Pfeiffer's glandular fever. From 2006 to 2008 he hardly played. In 2009 he made a comeback and was initially able to get closer to his best ranking. In qualifying for the ATP Tour event in Metz, he won all three matches and reached his only singles main draw of his career at the 2009 Open de Moselle. There he lost to Frenchman Marc Gicquel.

In 2012, Valent finally retired from professional tennis due to another knee injury. Since then he works as a tennis coach in Zurich.

== Juniors ==
As a junior, Valent posted a singles record of 81–24 and reached as high as No. 3 in the world in 2001 (and No. 25 in doubles).

== ATP Challenger and ITF Futures finals ==
=== Singles: 7 (2–5) ===
Legend ATP Challenger (0–0) ITF Futures (2–5)	Finals by surface Hard (1–4) Clay (0–1) Grass (0–0) Carpet (1–0)

Result	W–L	Date	Tournament	Tier	Surface	Opponent	Score
Win	1–0	Mar 2002	France F8, Melun	Futures	Carpet	(France) Grégory Carraz	6–3, 2–6, 6–4
Loss	1–1	Apr 2002	Jamaica F1, Kingston	Futures	Hard	(Venezuela) Kepler Orellana	2–6, 4–6
Loss	1–2	May 2002	Czech Republic F1, Most	Futures	Clay	(Czech Republic) František Čermák	2–6, 7–5, 4–6
Loss	1–3	Jun 2003	Spain F9, La Palma	Futures	Hard	(France) Marc Bauer	2–6, 1–6
Loss	1–4	Jun 2003	Spain F10, Tenerife	Futures	Hard	(Russia) Teymuraz Gabashvili	2–6, 0–6
Loss	1–5	Mar 2005	France F4, Lille	Futures	Hard	(Belgium) Steve Darcis	5–7, 3–6
Win	2–5	Sep 2005	France F14, Plaisir	Futures	Hard	(Germany) Philipp Marx	6–4, 7–6^{(7–4)}

=== Doubles: 5 (2–3) ===
Legend ATP Challenger (0–1) ITF Futures (2–2)	Finals by surface Hard (0–1) Clay (0–2) Grass (0–9) Carpet (2–0)

Result	W–L	Date	Tournament	Tier	Surface	Partner	Opponents	Score
Win	1–0	Mar 2003	France F8, Melun	Futures	Carpet	(Switzerland) Michael Lammer	(Egypt) Karim Maamoun (Egypt) Mohamed Mamoun	walkover
Loss	1–1	Apr 2003	France F9, Saint-Brieuc	Futures	Clay	(Switzerland) Michael Lammer	(France) Fabrice Betencourt (France) Édouard Roger-Vasselin	walkover
Loss	1–2	Sep 2003	France F16, Mulhouse	Futures	Hard	(Germany) Michael Berrer	(France) Gary Lugassy (France) Jean-Michel Pequery	0–6, 2–6
Win	2–2	Feb 2005	Austria F3, Bergheim	Futures	Carpet	(Germany) Lars Uebel	(Czech Republic) Jaroslav Pospíšil (Czech Republic) Radim Žitko	6–2, 7–6^{(7–2)}
Loss	2–3	Aug 2005	Geneva, Switzerland	Challenger	Clay	(Switzerland) Stéphane Bohli	(Spain) Rubén Ramírez Hidalgo (Spain) Santiago Ventura	3–6, 5–7

== Junior Grand Slam finals ==
=== Singles: 1 (1 title) ===
Result	Year	Tournament	Surface	Opponent	Score
Win	2001	Wimbledon	Grass	(Luxembourg) Gilles Müller	3–6, 7–5, 6–3
