= Sunil-Kumar Sipaeya =

Indian tennis player

- Country (sports): India
- Born: 4 April 1983 (age 43) Kapurthala, India
- Retired: 2013
- Plays: Left-handed
- Prize money: $62,462

Singles
- Highest ranking: No. 340 (13 January 2005)

Doubles
- Career record: 1–0 (Davis Cup)
- Highest ranking: No. 296 (23 May 2005)

Sunil-Kumar Sipaeya (born 4 April 1983) is an Indian former professional tennis player.

A left-handed player from Kapurthala, Sipaeya was a national hardcourt champion as a 16-year old in 1999 and made the junior doubles quarter-finals of the 2001 Wimbledon Championships.

Sipaeya represented India at the 2002 Asian Games and was a doubles silver-medalist at the 2003 Afro-Asian Games.

His career best singles ranking of 340 was attained in 2005 and he won two ITF Futures singles titles during his career. As a doubles player he was ranked as high as 296 in the world and won a further 15 ITF tournaments.

In 2007 he made his only Davis Cup appearance for India, as the doubles partner of Leander Paes in a tie against Uzbekistan. He and Paes were victorious in five sets, over Farrukh Dustov and Denis Istomin.

== See also ==
- List of India Davis Cup team representatives
