= 2001 Wimbledon Championships =

- Date: 25 June – 9 July
- Edition: 115th
- Category: Grand Slam (ITF)
- Draw: 128S/64D/64XD
- Prize money: £8,525,280
- Surface: Grass
- Location: Church Road; SW19, Wimbledon, London, United Kingdom
- Venue: All England Lawn Tennis and Croquet Club

Champions

Men's singles
- (Croatia) Goran Ivanišević

Women's singles
- (United States) Venus Williams

Men's doubles
- (United States) Donald Johnson / (United States) Jared Palmer

Women's doubles
- (United States) Lisa Raymond / (Australia) Rennae Stubbs

Mixed doubles
- (Czech Republic) Leoš Friedl / (Slovakia) Daniela Hantuchová

Boys' singles
- (Switzerland) Roman Valent

Girls' singles
- (Indonesia) Angelique Widjaja

Boys' doubles
- (Canada) Frank Dancevic / (Ecuador) Giovanni Lapentti

Girls' doubles
- (Argentina) Gisela Dulko / (United States) Ashley Harkleroad
- Wimbledon Championships

The 2001 Wimbledon Championships was a tennis tournament played on grass courts at the All England Lawn Tennis and Croquet Club in Wimbledon, London in the United Kingdom, held from 25 June to 9 July 2001. It was the 115th edition of the Wimbledon Championships, part of the 2001 ATP and WTA Tours, and it was the third Grand Slam tennis event of the year.

The tournament was the first in Wimbledon's 124-year history in which 32 players in the men's and women's draws were seeded, instead of the usual sixteen. This move was made to appease clay court players who were unhappy with the traditional seeding system, which favoured grass court results over those of other surfaces.

Pete Sampras was unsuccessful in his defence of the men's singles title, losing in the fourth round to 19-year-old Roger Federer, who was then relatively unknown. Goran Ivanišević won the title, defeating 2000 runner-up Pat Rafter in the final in five sets. Ivanišević had previously been runner-up three times (1992, 1994 and 1998), but had fallen to number 125 in the world by 2001 and had only entered the 2001 tournament after being granted a wild card. Venus Williams successfully defended the women's singles title, beating 19-year-old Justine Henin in the final in three sets. Henin became the first Belgian player to reach a Wimbledon final. Top seed Martina Hingis was beaten by Virginia Ruano Pascual in the first round.

It was originally scheduled to end on 8 July 2001, but the semifinal match between Ivanišević and Tim Henman was played on three separate days due to rain, and that was extended to 9 July, causing the women's singles and women's doubles championships moved to Day 13.

== Prize money ==
The total prize money for 2001 championships was £8,525,280. The winner of the men's title earned £500,000 while the women's singles champion earned £462,500.

Event	W	F	SF	QF	Round of 16	Round of 32	Round of 64	Round of 128
Men's singles	£500,000							
Women's singles	£462,500							
Men's doubles *	£205,000							—N/a
Women's doubles *	£189,620							—N/a
Mixed doubles *	£87,000							—N/a

_{* per team}

== Champions ==
=== Seniors ===
==== Men's singles ====
(Croatia) Goran Ivanišević defeated (Australia) Patrick Rafter, 6–3, 3–6, 6–3, 2–6, 9–7

- It was Ivanišević's 1st title of the year, and his 22nd (and last) overall. It was his only career Grand Slam title.
- This was Ivanišević's fourth Wimbledon final and Rafter's second. Ivanišević became the first wild card, the first Croatian player, and the lowest ranked player in history (world No. 125) to claim the Wimbledon title. He was also the first Croatian male tennis player to win a Grand Slam final.

==== Women's singles ====
(United States) Venus Williams defeated (Belgium) Justine Henin, 6–1, 3–6, 6–0

- It was Williams' 3rd title of the year, and her 18th overall. It was her 3rd career Grand Slam title, and her 2nd at Wimbledon.
- Henin became the first Belgian player (male or female) to reach the Wimbledon singles final.

==== Men's doubles ====
(United States) Donald Johnson / (United States) Jared Palmer defeated (Czech Republic) Jiří Novák / (Czech Republic) David Rikl, 6–4, 4–6, 6–3, 7–6^{(8–6)}

==== Women's doubles ====
(United States) Lisa Raymond / (Australia) Rennae Stubbs defeated (Belgium) Kim Clijsters / (Japan) Ai Sugiyama, 6–4, 6–3

==== Mixed doubles ====
(Czech Republic) Leoš Friedl / (Slovakia) Daniela Hantuchová defeated (United States) Mike Bryan / (South Africa) Liezel Huber, 4–6, 6–3, 6–2

=== Juniors ===
==== Boys' singles ====
(Switzerland) Roman Valent defeated (Luxembourg) Gilles Müller, 3–6, 7–5, 6–3

==== Girls' singles ====
(Indonesia) Angelique Widjaja defeated (Russia) Dinara Safina, 6–4, 0–6, 7–5

==== Boys' doubles ====
(Canada) Frank Dancevic / (Ecuador) Giovanni Lapentti defeated (Mexico) Bruno Echagaray / (Mexico) Santiago González, 6–1, 6–4

==== Girls' doubles ====
(Argentina) Gisela Dulko / (United States) Ashley Harkleroad defeated (Australia) Christina Horiatopoulos / (United States) Bethanie Mattek, 6–3, 6–1

== Singles seeds ==
=== Men's singles ===
1. (United States) Pete Sampras (fourth round, lost to Roger Federer)
2. (United States) Andre Agassi (semifinals, lost to Pat Rafter)
3. (Australia) Patrick Rafter (final, lost to Goran Ivanišević)
4. (Russia) Marat Safin (quarterfinals, lost to Goran Ivanišević)
5. (Australia) Lleyton Hewitt (fourth round, lost to Nicolas Escudé)
6. (United Kingdom) Tim Henman (semifinals, lost to Goran Ivanišević)
7. (Russia) Yevgeny Kafelnikov (third round, lost to Guillermo Cañas)
8. (Spain) Juan Carlos Ferrero (third round, lost to Greg Rusedski)
9. (France) Sébastien Grosjean (third round, lost to Nicolas Escudé)
10. (Sweden) Thomas Enqvist (quarterfinals, lost to Pat Rafter)
11. (Sweden) Thomas Johansson (second round, lost to Andy Roddick)
12. (United States) Jan-Michael Gambill (first round, lost to Chris Woodruff)
13. (France) Arnaud Clément (fourth round, lost to Marat Safin)
14. (South Africa) Wayne Ferreira (first round, lost to Andrei Stoliarov)
15. (Switzerland) Roger Federer (quarterfinals, lost to Tim Henman)
16. (Belarus) Vladimir Voltchkov (first round, lost to Mikhail Youzhny)
17. (Germany) Tommy Haas (first round, lost to Wayne Black)
18. (Sweden) Magnus Norman (withdrew because of injury)
19. (Germany) Nicolas Kiefer (fourth round, lost to Andre Agassi)
20. (France) Fabrice Santoro (third round, lost to Mikhail Youzhny)
21. (Spain) Carlos Moyá (second round, lost to Goran Ivanišević)
22. (Slovakia) Dominik Hrbatý (first round, lost to Raemon Sluiter)
23. (United States) Todd Martin (fourth round, lost to Tim Henman)
24. (France) Nicolas Escudé (quarterfinals, lost to Andre Agassi)
25. (Spain) Albert Portas (first round, lost to Davide Sanguinetti)
26. (Netherlands) Sjeng Schalken (third round, lost to Tim Henman)
27. (Morocco) Hicham Arazi (third round, lost to Pat Rafter)
28. (Argentina) Franco Squillari (first round, lost to Andreas Vinciguerra)
29. (Argentina) Guillermo Coria (first round, lost to Fernando Meligeni)
30. (Ecuador) Nicolás Lapentti (withdrew because of injury)
31. (Spain) Alberto Martín (first round, lost to Byron Black)
32. (Argentina) Gastón Gaudio (first round, lost to Guillermo Cañas)
33. (Sweden) Jonas Björkman (third round, lost to Roger Federer)
34. (Israel) Harel Levy (first round, lost to Tommy Robredo)

=== Women's singles ===
1. (Switzerland) Martina Hingis (first round, lost to Virginia Ruano Pascual)
2. (United States) Venus Williams (champion)
3. (United States) Lindsay Davenport (semifinals, lost to Venus Williams)
4. (United States) Jennifer Capriati (semifinals, lost to Justine Henin)
5. (United States) Serena Williams (quarterfinals, lost to Jennifer Capriati)
6. (France) Amélie Mauresmo (third round, lost to Tamarine Tanasugarn)
7. (Belgium) Kim Clijsters (quarterfinals, lost to Lindsay Davenport)
8. (Belgium) Justine Henin (final, lost to Venus Williams)
9. (France) Nathalie Tauziat (quarterfinals, lost to Venus Williams)
10. (Russia) Elena Dementieva (third round, lost to Anke Huber)
11. (South Africa) Amanda Coetzer (third round, lost to Meghann Shaughnessy)
12. (Bulgaria) Magdalena Maleeva (fourth round, lost to Serena Williams)
13. (Spain) Arantxa Sánchez Vicario (second round, lost to Lilia Osterloh)
14. (Federal Republic of Yugoslavia) Jelena Dokić (fourth round, lost to Lindsay Davenport)
15. (France) Sandrine Testud (fourth round, lost to Jennifer Capriati)
16. (Italy) Silvia Farina Elia (third round, lost to Nadia Petrova)
17. (United States) Meghann Shaughnessy (fourth round, lost to Kim Clijsters)
18. (Germany) Anke Huber (fourth round, lost to Justine Henin)
19. (Spain) Conchita Martínez (quarterfinals, lost to Justine Henin)
20. (United States) Amy Frazier (third round, lost to Magdalena Maleeva)
21. (Austria) Barbara Schett (third round, lost to Jelena Dokić)
22. (Argentina) Paola Suárez (first round, lost to Anastasia Myskina)
23. (Spain) Magüi Serna (first round, lost to Nadia Petrova)
24. (Slovakia) Henrieta Nagyová (first round, lost to Adriana Serra Zanetti)
25. (United States) Chanda Rubin (first round, lost to Barbara Schwartz)
26. (Luxembourg) Anne Kremer (first round, lost to Kristina Brandi)
27. (Spain) Ángeles Montolio (third round, lost to Kim Clijsters)
28. (United States) Lisa Raymond (third round, lost to Justine Henin)
29. (Russia) Elena Likhovtseva (third round, lost to Venus Williams)
30. (Switzerland) Patty Schnyder (third round, lost to Lindsay Davenport)
31. (Thailand) Tamarine Tanasugarn (fourth round, lost to Nathalie Tauziat)
32. (Russia) Tatiana Panova (third round, lost to Jennifer Capriati)

Preceded by 2001 French Open	Grand Slams	Succeeded by 2001 US Open
