= Todd Reid =

Australian tennis player (1984–2018)

- 23 June 2002, 1st rd Roehampton junior tournament
- Country (sports): Australia
- Residence: Melbourne, Australia
- Born: 3 June 1984 Sydney, Australia
- Died: 23 October 2018 (aged 34) Melbourne, Australia
- Height: 1.80 m (5 ft 11 in)
- Turned pro: 2002
- Retired: 2014
- Plays: Right-handed (two-handed backhand)
- Prize money: $302,000

Singles
- Career record: 14–22 (Grand Slam, ATP Tour level, and Davis Cup)
- Career titles: 0; 0 Challenger, 6 Futures
- Highest ranking: No. 105 (20 September 2004)

Grand Slam singles results
- Australian Open: 3R (2004)
- French Open: 1R (2004)
- Wimbledon: 1R (2004)
- US Open: Q1 (2004)

Doubles
- Career record: 2–7 (Grand Slam, ATP Tour level, and Davis Cup)
- Career titles: 0; 0 Challenger, 0 Futures
- Highest ranking: No. 305 (10 February 2003)

Grand Slam doubles results
- Australian Open: 2R (2003)
- Last updated on: 29 August 2021.

Todd Reid (3 June 1984 – 23 October 2018) was an Australian professional tennis player. He excelled as a junior and peaked in the Men's Tour in September 2004, reaching a career-high singles ranking of world No. 105.

== Tennis career ==
=== Juniors ===
28 May 2002, 2rd rd Astrid Bowl

As a junior tennis player, Reid reached several finals on the Australian Junior calendar and in 2002, he won the Wimbledon Boys' Singles title, defeating the likes of Steve Darcis and Frank Dancevic on his way to victory. His victory led him to being named 2002 Australian Institute of Sport Junior Athlete of the Year.

Reid compiled a win–loss record of 87–43 in singles (97–40 in doubles) and reached as high as No. 2 in the junior singles world rankings in 2002 (and No. 4 in doubles).

=== Pro tour ===
Reid began playing Futures tournaments in 2001 and won his first Futures tournament in 2002 in New Zealand. He began playing Challenger tournaments after his maiden Futures victory, with his ranking reaching new heights he made the cut for the qualifying tournament in Nottingham and played his first ATP match against Greg Rusedski after qualifying. Reid's 2004 Australian summer was the biggest highlight of his professional career where he reached the final of a challenger in New Caledonia (losing to Guillermo Cañas in the final), made the quarterfinal in Adelaide and Sydney and made the third round of the Australian Open, where he lost to second seed and eventual champion Roger Federer in straight sets, winning just four games. He had beaten Sargis Sargsian in five sets in his preceding second round match on the Melbourne Arena, during which he struggled with a foot injury, cramping and vomiting.

In May 2005, Reid, due to injuries, quit the tennis tour as a full-time participant. He did play two Futures events in Victoria, Australia in early 2006, but did not advance beyond the second round. He played no events in 2007. The following year Reid played one Futures event in April in Spain and reached the final. He then played one event in Australia in September, losing in the first round, and another in December, losing through retirement in the semi-finals. In the spring of 2009, Reid played three events, retiring from matches due to injury in each event.

Reid's career-high doubles ranking was World No. 305, which he achieved in February 2003. He won $301,844 during his career.

== Death ==
Reid was found dead on 23 October 2018 at the age of 34. A cause of death has not been announced.

== ATP Challenger and ITF Futures finals ==
=== Singles: 10 (6–4) ===
Legend ATP Challenger (0–1) ITF Futures (6–3)	Finals by surface Hard (2–2) Clay (4–1) Grass (0–1) Carpet (0–0)

Result	W–L	Date	Tournament	Tier	Surface	Opponent	Score
Win	1–0	Mar 2002	New Zealand F1, Blenheim	Futures	Hard	(New Zealand) Mark Nielsen	7–5, 7–6^{(9–7)}
Win	2–0	May 2002	USA F11, Hallendale	Futures	Clay	(Brazil) Márcio Carlsson	7–5, 4–6, 6–4
Loss	2–1	Dec 2002	Australia F6, Barmera	Futures	Grass	(Australia) Mark Hlawaty	6–7^{(1–7)}, 6–7^{(4–7)}
Win	3–1	May 2003	Great Britain F6, Edinburgh	Futures	Clay	(Australia) Joseph Sirianni	6–3, 6–1
Win	4–1	Nov 2003	Australia F3, Melbourne	Futures	Clay	(Germany) Bernard Parun	6–1, 6–3
Win	5–1	Nov 2003	Australia F4, Melbourne	Futures	Clay	(Australia) Peter Luczak	6–4, 7–5
Loss	5–2	Jan 2004	Nouméa, New Caledonia	Challenger	Hard	(Argentina) Guillermo Cañas	4–6, 3–6
Loss	5–3	Feb 2005	Australia F1, Wollongong	Futures	Hard	(Chinese Taipei) Ti Chen	3–6, 0–6
Win	6–3	Mar 2005	USA F6, McAllen	Futures	Hard	(United States) Michael Russell	6–3, 6–0
Loss	6–4	Apr 2008	Spain F16, Reus	Futures	Clay	(Spain) Javier Genaro-Martinez	1–6, 5–7

=== Doubles: 2 (0–2) ===
Legend ATP Challenger (0–0) ITF Futures (0–2)	Finals by surface Hard (0–0) Clay (0–2) Grass (0–0) Carpet (0–0)

Result	W–L	Date	Tournament	Tier	Surface	Partner	Opponents	Score
Loss	0–1	May 2003	Great Britain F5, Bournemouth	Futures	Clay	(Australia) Raphael Durek	(Czech Republic) Tomáš Berdych (Czech Republic) Michal Navrátil	3–6, 2–6
Loss	0–2	Nov 2003	Australia F3, Melbourne	Futures	Clay	(Australia) Adam Kennedy	(Australia) Raphael Durek (Australia) Alun Jones	6–7^{(7–9)}, 4–6

== Performance timeline ==
Key
W	F	SF	QF	#R	RR	Q#	P#	DNQ	A	Z#	PO	G	S	B	NMS	NTI	P	NH

(W) winner; (F) finalist; (SF) semifinalist; (QF) quarterfinalist; (#R) rounds 4, 3, 2, 1; (RR) round-robin stage; (Q#) qualification round; (P#) preliminary round; (DNQ) did not qualify; (A) absent; (Z#) Davis/Fed Cup Zonal Group (with number indication) or (PO) play-off; (G) gold, (S) silver or (B) bronze Olympic/Paralympic medal; (NMS) not a Masters tournament; (NTI) not a Tier I tournament; (P) postponed; (NH) not held; (SR) strike rate (events won / competed); (W–L) win–loss record.
To avoid confusion and double counting, these charts are updated at the conclusion of a tournament or when the player's participation has ended.

=== Singles ===
Tournament	2001	2002	2003	2004	2005	2006	SR	W–L	Win %
Grand Slam tournaments
Australian Open	Q1	1R	1R	3R	1R	Q2	0 / 4	2–4	33%
French Open	A	A	A	1R	Q1	A	0 / 1	0–1	0%
Wimbledon	A	A	Q2	1R	A	A	0 / 1	0–1	0%
US Open	A	A	A	Q1	A	A	0 / 0	0–0	–
Win–loss	0–0	0–1	0–1	2–3	0–1	0–0	0 / 6	2–6	25%
ATP World Tour Masters 1000
Indian Wells	A	A	A	Q2	A	A	0 / 0	0–0	–
Miami	A	A	A	3R	Q1	A	0 / 1	2–1	67%
Canada Masters	A	A	A	2R	A	A	0 / 1	1–1	50%
Cincinnati	A	A	A	1R	A	A	0 / 1	0–1	0%
Win–loss	0–0	0–0	0–0	3–3	0–0	0–0	0 / 3	3–3	50%

== Junior Grand Slam finals ==
=== Singles: 2 (1 title, 1 runner-up) ===
Result	Year	Tournament	Surface	Opponent	Score
Loss	2002	Australian Open	Hard	(France) Clément Morel	4–6, 4–6
Win	2002	Wimbledon	Grass	(Algeria) Lamine Ouahab	7–6^{(7–5)}, 6–4

=== Doubles: 2 (1 title, 1 runner-up) ===
Result	Year	Tournament	Surface	Partner	Opponents	Score
Win	2002	Australian Open	Hard	(Australia) Ryan Henry	(Romania) Florin Mergea (Romania) Horia Tecău	walkover
Loss	2002	French Open	Clay	(Australia) Ryan Henry	(Germany) Markus Bayer (Germany) Philipp Petzschner	5–7, 4–6
