= Robert Yim =

American tennis player

- Country (sports): United States
- Born: February 25, 1985 (age 40); Glendale, California
- Turned pro: 2002
- Plays: Left-handed
- Prize money: $46,307

Singles
- Career record: 0-2
- Career titles: 0
- Highest ranking: No. 444 (July 19, 2004)

Grand Slam singles results
- US Open: 1R (2003)

Robert Yim (born February 25, 1985) is a former professional tennis player from the United States.

Yim was given a wildcard into the main draw of the 2003 US Open and lost in straight sets to Todd Martin in the opening round.
