= Clément Morel =

French tennis player (born 1984)

- Full name: Clément Morel
- Country (sports): France; Monaco (2006—)
- Born: 16 July 1984 (age 42) Oullins, Lyon, France
- Retired: 2009
- Plays: Right-handed
- Prize money: $43,924

Singles
- Career record: 0–1
- Career titles: 0; 0 Challenger, 2 Futures
- Highest ranking: No. 387 (15 October 2007)

Grand Slam singles results
- French Open: Q1 (2004)

Doubles
- Career record: 0–0
- Career titles: 0; 0 Challenger, 5 Futures
- Highest ranking: No. 509 (1 October 2007)
- Last updated on: 11 September 2021.

Clément Morel (born 16 July 1984) is a French–Monegasque former professional tennis player.

== Career ==
Morel was the junior champion at the 2002 Australian Open. He defeated countryman Jo-Wilfried Tsonga in the semi-finals, then won the title with a win over Todd Reid in the final. In the juniors event at the 2002 Wimbledon Championships, Morel lost in the second round to Ryan Henry, with a final set scoreline of 24–26, which was a tournament record.

He took part in qualifying for the 2004 French Open and also appeared in an ATP Challenger tournament in Grenoble that year, but otherwise played on the Futures circuit. His two Futures titles came in South Africa in 2006 and the other a 2008 tournament in Belgium.

In 2008 he switched nationalities and began representing the Monaco Davis Cup team. He played two matches, the first was a win over Algerian Slimane Saoudi in 2008 and the other a loss to Finland's Henri Laaksonen the following year.

Clément Morel continued his studies at EM Lyon Business School

== Junior Grand Slam finals ==
=== Singles: 1 (1 title) ===
Result	Year	Tournament	Surface	Opponent	Score
Win	2002	Australian Open	Hard	(Australia) Todd Reid	6–4, 6–4

== ATP Challenger and ITF Futures finals ==
=== Singles: 8 (2–6) ===
Legend ATP Challenger (0–0) ITF Futures (2–6)	Finals by surface Hard (1–5) Clay (1–1) Grass (0–0) Carpet (0–0)

Result	W–L	Date	Tournament	Tier	Surface	Opponent	Score
Loss	0–1	Sep 2003	Jamaica F9, Montego Bay	Futures	Hard	(France) Gilles Simon	3–6, 2–6
Loss	0–2	Mar 2006	Israel F2, Raanana	Futures	Hard	(Israel) Andy Ram	3–6, 6–3, 3–6
Loss	0–3	Oct 2006	Botswana F1, Gaborone	Futures	Hard	(Morocco) Talal Ouahabi	6–4, 6–7^{(6–8)}, 3–6
Win	1–3	Oct 2006	South Africa F1, Pretoria	Futures	Hard	(South Africa) Pieter Calitz	6–7^{(3–7)}, 6–1, 6–1
Loss	1–4	Mar 2007	Portugal F2, Lagos	Futures	Hard	(Netherlands) Peter Wessels	3–6, 2–6
Loss	1–5	Jul 2007	Georgia F1, Tbilisi	Futures	Hard	(Georgia (country)) Lado Chikhladze	6–7^{(5–7)}, 4–6
Win	2–5	Aug 2008	Belgium F1, Eupen	Futures	Clay	(Netherlands) Romano Frantzen	7–5, 2–6, 6–1
Loss	2–6	Aug 2008	Belgium F2, Koksijde	Futures	Clay	(Morocco) Rabie Chaki	4–6, 3–6

=== Doubles: 11 (5–6) ===
Legend ATP Challenger (0–0) ITF Futures (5–6)	Finals by surface Hard (1–3) Clay (4–3) Grass (0–0) Carpet (0–0)

Result	W–L	Date	Tournament	Tier	Surface	Partner	Opponents	Score
Loss	0–1	Jan 2003	France F2, Angers	Futures	Clay	(France) Laurent Recouderc	(France) Nicolas Mahut (France) Edouard Roger-Vasselin	1–6, 6–7^{(0–7)}
Loss	0–2	Sep 2003	Jamaica F9, Montego Bay	Futures	Hard	(France) Gilles Simon	(Jamaica) Dustin Brown (Jamaica) Ryan Russell	6–7^{(4–7)}, 2–6
Win	1–2	Aug 2004	Iran F1, Tehran	Futures	Clay	(Monaco) Benjamin Balleret	(Uzbekistan) Sarvar Ikramov (Uzbekistan) Murad Inoyatov	6–1, 6–1
Loss	1–3	Aug 2004	Iran F2, Tehran	Futures	Clay	(Monaco) Benjamin Balleret	(France) Charles Roche (France) Xavier Audouy	4–6, 1–6
Loss	1–4	Aug 2005	Lebanon F2, Beirut	Futures	Clay	(Monaco) Benjamin Balleret	(Lebanon) Patrick Chucri (Sweden) Alexander Hartman	7–6^{(7–3)}, 6–7^{(2–7)}, 0–1 ret.
Win	2–4	Aug 2005	Iran F1, Tehran	Futures	Clay	(Monaco) Benjamin Balleret	(Pakistan) Asim Shafik (Pakistan) Aqeel Khan	6–2, 7–5
Win	3–4	Mar 2006	Israel F2, Raanana	Futures	Hard	(Monaco) Benjamin Balleret	(Israel) Ishay Hadash (North Macedonia) Predrag Rusevski	6–2, 4–6, 6–3
Win	4–4	Oct 2006	South Africa F1, Pretoria	Futures	Hard	(France) Philippe de Bonnevie	(South Africa) Wesley Baptiste (South Africa) Rikus De Villiers	6–3, 7–6^{(8–6)}
Win	5–4	Jul 2007	Iran F2, Tehran	Futures	Clay	(France) Charles Roche	(Kazakhstan) Syrym Abdukhalikov (Belarus) Sergey Betov	6–3, 3–6, 6–3
Loss	5–5	Aug 2007	Georgia F2, Tbilisi	Futures	Hard	(France) Charles Roche	(Kazakhstan) Syrym Abdukhalikov (Belarus) Sergey Betov	0–2 ret.
Loss	5–6	Sep 2007	Poland F8, Opole	Futures	Clay	(Monaco) Benjamin Balleret	(Poland) Blazej Koniusz (Poland) Mateusz Kowalczyk	1–6, 1–6
