= Ryan Russell (tennis) =

Jamaican tennis player (born 1983)

- Country (sports): Jamaica
- Born: 6 July 1983 (age 42); Montego Bay, Jamaica
- Plays: Left-handed
- Prize money: $23,493

Singles
- Highest ranking: No. 503 (26 May 2003)

Doubles
- Career record: 0–1 (ATP Tour)
- Highest ranking: No. 463 (31 March 2003)

Ryan Russell (born 6 July 1983) is a Jamaican former professional tennis player.

== Tennis career ==
Russell, a left-handed player from Montego Bay, is the son of tennis player Richard Russell and was trained at the Nick Bollettieri academy in Florida. Highly ranked in junior tennis, he was a junior Wimbledon doubles semi-finalist and debuted for the Jamaica Davis Cup team as a 16-year old. He played in the Davis Cup until 2007, amassing a record 20 singles wins. His only ATP Tour main draw appearance came in doubles at the 2002 Hall of Fame Championships in Newport and he won six ITF Futures doubles titles during his career.

== ITF Futures titles ==
=== Doubles: (6) ===
| No. | Date | Tournament | Surface | Partner | Opponents | Score |
|---|---|---|---|---|---|---|
| 1. | Jun 2002 | Jamaica F7, Montego Bay | Hard | (Canada) Stephan Timu | (Lebanon) Will Farah-Lebar (United States) Matthew Snyder | 6–4, 6–4 |
| 2. | Nov 2002 | Barbados F1, Bridgetown | Hard | (Netherlands Antilles) Jean-Julien Rojer | (United States) Mirko Pehar (Bolivia) Javier Taborga | 6–4, 4–6, 6–1 |
| 3. | Dec 2002 | Jamaica F22, Trelawny | Hard | (Netherlands Antilles) Jean-Julien Rojer | (The Bahamas) Bjorn Munroe (United States) Matthew Rutherford | 6–2, 6–2 |
| 4. | Sep 2003 | Jamaica F9, Montego Bay | Hard | (Jamaica) Dustin Brown | (France) Clément Morel (France) Gilles Simon | 7–6^{(4)}, 6–2 |
| 5. | Oct 2004 | Venezuela F2, Caracas | Hard | (France) Vincent Baudat | (Cuba) Ricardo Chile (Cuba) Sandor Martínez | 6–4, 4–6, 7–6^{(4)} |
| 6. | Apr 2005 | Kuwait F1, Mishref | Hard | (Romania) Florin Mergea | (Czech Republic) Jakub Hasek (Czech Republic) Josef Neštický | 6–1, 3–0 ret. |
