= Ryan Henry =

Australian tennis player

- Country (sports): Australia
- Residence: Sydney, Australia
- Born: 14 October 1984 (age 42) Forster, New South Wales, Australia
- Height: 6 ft (183 cm)
- Turned pro: 2002
- Plays: Right-handed
- Prize money: $27,824

Singles
- Career record: 0–1
- Career titles: 0; 0 Challenger, 0 Futures
- Highest ranking: No. 424 (4 August 2003)

Grand Slam singles results
- Australian Open: 1R (2003)

Doubles
- Career record: 1–2
- Career titles: 0; 0 Challenger, 1 Futures
- Highest ranking: No. 271 (18 Aug 2003)

Grand Slam doubles results
- Australian Open: 2R (2003)
- Last updated on: 30 August 2021.

Ryan Henry (born 14 October 1984) is a former professional tennis player from Australia.

Henry had an eventful year as a junior in 2002. He and partner Todd Reid won the boys' doubles title at the 2002 Australian Open and they also finished runners-up in the 2002 French Open. In Wimbledon that year he created a tournament record when he defeated France's Clément Morel 26–24 in the final set. Constantly interrupted by rain, their encounter lasted three days. He lost to Richard Gasquet in the singles semi-finals of the 2002 US Open, unable to convert three match points.

The following year, he was given wildcard entry into the Australian Open and met Julian Knowle in the first round. He lost the match in four sets. In the men's doubles he was again paired with Reid and they were able to defeat Germans Karsten Braasch and Rainer Schüttler in the opening round. They were unable to get past top seeds Mark Knowles and Daniel Nestor in their next fixture.

== Junior Grand Slam finals ==
=== Doubles: 2 (1 title, 1 runner-up) ===
Result	Year	Tournament	Surface	Partner	Opponents	Score
Win	2002	Australian Open	Hard	(Australia) Todd Reid	(Romania) Florin Mergea (Romania) Horia Tecau	walkover
Loss	2002	French Open	Clay	(Australia) Todd Reid	(Germany) Markus Bayer (Germany) Philipp Petzschner	5–7, 4–6

== ATP Challenger and ITF Futures finals ==
=== Doubles: 1 (1–0) ===
Legend ATP Challenger (0–0) ITF Futures (1–0)	Finals by surface Hard (0–0) Clay (1–0) Grass (0–0) Carpet (0–0)

Result	W–L	Date	Tournament	Tier	Surface	Partner	Opponents	Score
Win	1–0	Mar 2005	Australia F3, Beaumaris	Futures	Clay	(Australia) Chris Guccione	(Australia) Alun Jones (Netherlands) Paul Logtens	7–5, 6–2
