= Raphael Durek =

Tennis player (1984-)

- Country (sports): Australia
- Residence: Sydney, Australia
- Born: 2 February 1984 (age 41); Belo Horizonte, Brazil
- Height: 1.88 m (6 ft 2 in)
- Plays: Right-handed
- Prize money: $94,218

Singles
- Career record: 0–1 (at ATP Tour level, Grand Slam level, and in Davis Cup)
- Career titles: 3 ITF
- Highest ranking: No. 400 (20 September 2004)

Doubles
- Career record: 2–3 (at ATP Tour level, Grand Slam level, and in Davis Cup)
- Career titles: 1 Challenger, 14 ITF
- Highest ranking: No. 150 (1 December 2003)
- Last updated on: 8 March 2021.

Raphael Durek (born 2 February 1984) is a former Brazilian-born Australian tennis player.

Durek has a career high ATP singles ranking of 400 achieved on 20 September 2004. He also has a career high ATP doubles ranking of 150 achieved on 1 December 2003.

Durek won one ATP Challenger doubles title at the 2007 Abierto de Puebla.
