= 2002 Neridé Prague Indoor – Singles =

Singles
- 2002 Neridé Prague Indoor

Final
- Champion: (Croatia) Mario Ančić
- Runner-up: (France) Jérôme Golmard
- Score: 6–1, 6–1

Events
| Singles | Doubles |
- Neridé Prague Indoor

The men's singles of the 2002 Neridé Prague Indoor tournament was played on indoor hard courts in Průhonice, Czech Republic.

This was the third edition of the event.

Defending champion Ota Fukárek lost on first round.

Mario Ančić won in the final 6–1, 6–1 against Jérôme Golmard.

== Seeds ==
1. (France) Antony Dupuis (first round)
2. (Switzerland) Marc Rosset (semifinals)
3. (Croatia) Željko Krajan (first round)
4. (Monaco) Jean-René Lisnard (first round)
5. (Austria) Julian Knowle (first round)
6. (France) Jérôme Golmard (final)
7. (Croatia) Mario Ančić (champion)
8. (Switzerland) Ivo Heuberger (first round)

== Draw ==
Key

- Q = Qualifier
- WC = Wild card
- LL = Lucky loser
- Alt = Alternate
- ITF = ITF entry
- PR = Protected ranking
- SR = Special ranking
- SE = Special exempt
- JE = Junior exempt
- JR = Junior Accelerator Programme entrant
- CO = College Accelerator Programme entrant
- NG = Next Gen Accelerator Program entrant
- w/o = Walkover
- r = Retired
- d = Defaulted

=== Finals ===
Semifinals
(Slovakia) Karol Beck | 3 | 6 | 2
7 | (Croatia) Mario Ančić | 6 | 4 | 6
1 | (France) Jérôme Golmard | 6 | 6
2 | (Switzerland) Marc Rosset | 3 | 1

Final
7 | (Croatia) Mario Ančić | 6 | 6
6 | (France) Jérôme Golmard | 1 | 1

=== Top half ===
First round
(Sweden) Robin Söderling | 6 | 6
1 | (France) Antony Dupuis | 4 | 3
(Italy) C Caratti | 6 | 4 | 6
(United States) Michael Russell | 2 | 6 | 4
(Czech Republic) Robin Vik | 6 | 7
(Germany) J Herm-Zahlava | 4 | 6^{2}
(Slovakia) Karol Beck | 6 | 1
8 | (Switzerland) Ivo Heuberger | 4 | 0r
(Germany) Axel Pretzsch | 6 | 6
4 | (Monaco) J-R Lisnard | 2 | 3
(Switzerland) Yves Allegro | 6 | 6
(Austria) Alexander Peya | 4 | 0
(Croatia) Lovro Zovko | 7 | 6
(Czech Republic) Petr Kralert | 6^{2} | 3
7 | (Croatia) Mario Ančić | 6 | 6
(Czech Republic) Adam Vejmelka | 1 | 2

Second round
(Sweden) Robin Söderling | 6 | 6^{6} | 6^{3}
(Italy) C Caratti | 1 | 7 | 7
(Czech Republic) Robin Vik | 6^{5} | 3
(Slovakia) Karol Beck | 7 | 6
(Germany) Axel Pretzsch | 6 | 6^{5} | 4
(Switzerland) Yves Allegro | 4 | 7 | 6
(Croatia) Lovro Zovko | 6^{0} | 4
7 | (Croatia) Mario Ančić | 7 | 6

Quarterfinals
(Italy) C Caratti | 5 | 1
(Slovakia) Karol Beck | 7 | 6
(Switzerland) Yves Allegro | 4 | 7 | 3
7 | (Croatia) Mario Ančić | 6 | 6^{1} | 6

Semifinals
(Slovakia) Karol Beck | 3 | 6 | 2
7 | (Croatia) Mario Ančić | 6 | 4 | 6

=== Bottom half ===
First round
6 | (France) Jérôme Golmard | 7 | 7
(Romania) Victor Hănescu | 6^{1} | 6^{5}
(Sweden) Björn Rehnquist | 6 | 6
(Czech Republic) Ota Fukárek | 2 | 2
(Czech Republic) David Miketa | 7
(Germany) Björn Phau | 5r
(Switzerland) George Bastl | 7 | 6
3 | (Croatia) Željko Krajan | 6^{6} | 3
(Austria) Werner Eschauer | 7 | 7
5 | (Austria) Julian Knowle | 6^{2} | 6^{9}
(Czech Republic) Tomáš Berdych | 7 | 6
(Czech Republic) Tomáš Zíb | 6^{4} | 3
(Netherlands) D van Scheppingen | 7 | 6
(Czech Republic) Martin Pucalka | 6^{4} | 4
2 | (Switzerland) Marc Rosset | 6 | 6
(Czech Republic) J Levinský | 3 | 2

Second round
6 | (France) Jérôme Golmard | 6 | 6
(Sweden) Björn Rehnquist | 3 | 1
(Czech Republic) David Miketa | 3 | 6^{6}
(Switzerland) George Bastl | 6 | 7
(Austria) Werner Eschauer | 6^{4} | 6^{2}
(Czech Republic) Tomáš Berdych | 7 | 7
(Netherlands) D van Scheppingen | 3 | 2
2 | (Switzerland) Marc Rosset | 6 | 6

Quarterfinals
6 | (France) Jérôme Golmard | 6 | 3 | 6
(Switzerland) George Bastl | 3 | 6 | 1
(Czech Republic) Tomáš Berdych | 4 | 2
2 | (Switzerland) Marc Rosset | 6 | 6

Semifinals
6 | (France) Jérôme Golmard | 6 | 6
2 | (Switzerland) Marc Rosset | 3 | 1
