= 2001 Neridé Prague Indoor – Doubles =

Doubles
- 2001 Neridé Prague Indoor

Final
- Champion: (Czech Republic) Lukáš Dlouhý (Czech Republic) David Miketa
- Runner-up: (Slovakia) Karol Beck (Slovakia) Igor Zelenay
- Score: 6–1, 4–6, 6–3

Events
Singles	Doubles
- Neridé Prague Indoor

This was the second edition of the event.

Kristian Pless and Aisam-ul-Haq Qureshi decided not to defend the title.

Lukáš Dlouhý and David Miketa won defeating Karol Beck and Igor Zelenay 6–1, 4–6, 6–3 in the final.

== Seeds ==
1. (Czech Republic) Petr Luxa / (Czech Republic) Radek Štěpánek (quarterfinals)
2. (Czech Republic) František Čermák / (Czech Republic) Ota Fukárek (semifinals)
3. (Netherlands) Sander Groen / (Netherlands) Jan Siemerink (first round)
4. (Australia) Grant Silcock / (Netherlands) Djalmar Sistermans (first round)

== Draw ==
Key

- Q = Qualifier
- WC = Wild card
- LL = Lucky loser
- Alt = Alternate
- ITF = ITF entry
- PR = Protected ranking
- SR = Special ranking
- SE = Special exempt
- JE = Junior exempt
- JR = Junior Accelerator Programme entrant
- CO = College Accelerator Programme entrant
- NG = Next Gen Accelerator Program entrant
- w/o = Walkover
- r = Retired
- d = Defaulted

First round
1	(Czech Republic) Petr Luxa (Czech Republic) Radek Štěpánek	6	6^{5}	6
(Russia) Yuri Schukin (Czech Republic) Tomáš Zíb	4	7	3
(Slovakia) Karol Beck (Slovakia) Igor Zelenay	4	6	6
(Slovakia) Viktor Bruthans (Slovakia) Branislav Sekáč	6	3	2
(Czech Republic) Petr Dezort (Czech Republic) Petr Kovačka	6	6
3	(Netherlands) Sander Groen (Netherlands) Jan Siemerink	3	3
(Czech Republic) J Levinský (Czech Republic) Michal Navrátil	6	6
(Poland) Adam Chadaj (Czech Republic) Dušan Karol	4	3
(Czech Republic) Lukáš Dlouhý (Czech Republic) David Miketa	4	6	6
(Russia) Mikhail Elgin (Russia) K Ivanov-Smolensky	6	3	4
(Czech Republic) Petr Pála (Czech Republic) Jiri Vrbka	7	6
4	(Australia) Grant Silcock (Netherlands) D Sistermans	6^{8}	3
(Netherlands) Bobbie Altelaar (Netherlands) Edwin Kempes	6	6
(Czech Republic) Tomáš Berdych (Czech Republic) Robin Vik	3	4
2	(Czech Republic) František Čermák (Czech Republic) Ota Fukárek	6	4	6
(Italy) C Caratti (Italy) S Pescosolido	3	6	4

Quarterfinals
1	(Czech Republic) Petr Luxa (Czech Republic) Radek Štěpánek	3	7	2
(Slovakia) Karol Beck (Slovakia) Igor Zelenay	6	6^{3}	6
(Czech Republic) Petr Dezort (Czech Republic) Petr Kovačka	6	6
(Czech Republic) J Levinský (Czech Republic) Michal Navrátil	3	4
(Czech Republic) Lukáš Dlouhý (Czech Republic) David Miketa	7	6
(Czech Republic) Petr Pála (Czech Republic) Jiri Vrbka	6^{6}	3
(Netherlands) Bobbie Altelaar (Netherlands) Edwin Kempes	1	4
2	(Czech Republic) František Čermák (Czech Republic) Ota Fukárek	6	6

Semifinals
(Slovakia) Karol Beck (Slovakia) Igor Zelenay	7	7
(Czech Republic) Petr Dezort (Czech Republic) Petr Kovačka	6^{3}	6^{5}
(Czech Republic) Lukáš Dlouhý (Czech Republic) David Miketa	3	7	6
2	(Czech Republic) František Čermák (Czech Republic) Ota Fukárek	6	5	4

Finals
(Slovakia) Karol Beck (Slovakia) Igor Zelenay	1	6	3
(Czech Republic) Lukáš Dlouhý (Czech Republic) David Miketa	6	4	6
