= 2001 Wimbledon Championships – Men's singles qualifying =

Men's singles qualifying
- 2001 Wimbledon Championships

Events
Singles	men	women		boys	girls
Doubles	men	women	mixed	boys	girls
WC Singles	men	women	quad
WC Doubles	men	women	quad
Legends	men	women	seniors

Qualification
Singles	men	women
Doubles	men	women
- Wimbledon Championships

Players and pairs who neither have high enough rankings nor receive wild cards may participate in a qualifying tournament held one week before the annual Wimbledon Tennis Championships.

== Seeds ==
1. (United States) Michael Russell (first round)
2. (Philippines) Cecil Mamiit (qualified)
3. (Brazil) Alexandre Simoni (second round)
4. (France) Michaël Llodra (qualified)
5. (Brazil) André Sá (qualifying competition, lucky loser)
6. (Switzerland) George Bastl (first round)
7. (Italy) Federico Luzzi (first round)
8. (Germany) Christian Vinck (second round)
9. (Canada) Sébastien Lareau (first round)
10. (Belgium) Dick Norman (first round)
11. (Thailand) Paradorn Srichaphan (qualifying competition, lucky loser)
12. (United States) Bob Bryan (qualified)
13. (South Africa) Neville Godwin (qualified)
14. (Chile) Fernando González (first round)
15. (Switzerland) Ivo Heuberger (qualified)
16. (France) Nicolas Coutelot (first round)
17. (Czech Republic) Ota Fukárek (first round)
18. (France) Cyril Saulnier (second round)
19. (United States) Taylor Dent (qualified)
20. (United States) James Blake (first round)
21. (Czech Republic) Jan Vacek (qualifying competition, lucky loser)
22. (Canada) Daniel Nestor (qualified)
23. (Georgia (country)) Irakli Labadze (second round)
24. (United States) Kevin Kim (first round)
25. (Japan) Takao Suzuki (second round)
26. (Zimbabwe) Wayne Black (qualifying competition, lucky loser)
27. (Germany) Marc-Kevin Goellner (second round)
28. (United States) Hugo Armando (second round)
29. (Germany) Axel Pretzsch (first round)
30. (South Korea) Yoon Yong-il (qualified)
31. (Italy) Vincenzo Santopadre (first round)
32. (Austria) Julian Knowle (qualified)

== Qualifiers ==
1. (Canada) Daniel Nestor
2. (Philippines) Cecil Mamiit
3. (South Korea) Yoon Yong-il
4. (France) Michaël Llodra
5. (Australia) Scott Draper
6. (United States) Taylor Dent
7. (India) Leander Paes
8. (France) Stéphane Huet
9. (United Kingdom) Luke Milligan
10. (Australia) Todd Woodbridge
11. (Austria) Julian Knowle
12. (United States) Bob Bryan
13. (South Africa) Neville Godwin
14. (Russia) Artem Derepasko
15. (Switzerland) Ivo Heuberger
16. (Sweden) Fredrik Jonsson

== Lucky losers ==
1. (Brazil) André Sá
2. (Thailand) Paradorn Srichaphan
3. (Czech Republic) Jan Vacek
4. (Zimbabwe) Wayne Black
5. (United States) Mardy Fish

== Qualifying draw ==
=== First qualifier ===
First round
1	(United States) Michael Russell	7^{7}	2	2
(Italy) Cristiano Caratti	6^{3}	6	6
(Federal Republic of Yugoslavia) Nenad Zimonjić	6	7
(Argentina) Mariano Delfino	3	5
(France) Lionel Roux	6	7
(Israel) Noam Behr	2	5
(Argentina) Ignacio Hirigoyen	1	4
22	(Canada) Daniel Nestor	6	6

Second round
(Italy) Cristiano Caratti	7	6
(Federal Republic of Yugoslavia) Nenad Zimonjić	5	3
(France) Lionel Roux	1	6^{6}
22	(Canada) Daniel Nestor	6	7^{8}

Qualifying competition
(Italy) Cristiano Caratti	6^{3}	2	7^{8}	5
22	(Canada) Daniel Nestor	7^{7}	6	6^{6}	7

=== Second qualifier ===
First round
2	(Philippines) Cecil Mamiit	6	6
(Austria) Jürgen Melzer	1	4
WC	(United Kingdom) Andrew Banks	6	4	6
(France) Sébastien de Chaunac	4	6	8
(Canada) Frédéric Niemeyer	7^{7}	6
(United States) Robert Kendrick	6^{2}	3
(South Africa) Marcos Ondruska	6^{5}	7^{7}	6
20	(United States) James Blake	7^{7}	6^{3}	3

Second round
2	(Philippines) Cecil Mamiit	6	7^{7}
(France) Sébastien de Chaunac	4	6^{1}
(Canada) Frédéric Niemeyer	4	1
(South Africa) Marcos Ondruska	6	6

Qualifying competition
2	(Philippines) Cecil Mamiit	7	6^{6}	6	1	6
(South Africa) Marcos Ondruska	5	7^{8}	2	6	1

=== Third qualifier ===
First round
3	(Brazil) Alexandre Simoni	6	6
(Russia) Dmitry Tursunov	3	4
(Germany) Marcello Craca	1	4
(Venezuela) Jimy Szymanski	6	6
(Croatia) Ivo Karlović	6^{3}	7^{7}	6
(Italy) Filippo Messori	7^{7}	6^{2}	3
(Argentina) Sergio Roitman	2	3
30	(South Korea) Yoon Yong-il	6	6

Second round
3	(Brazil) Alexandre Simoni	4	6	4
(Venezuela) Jimy Szymanski	6	3	6
(Croatia) Ivo Karlović	1	2
30	(South Korea) Yoon Yong-il	6	6

Qualifying competition
(Venezuela) Jimy Szymanski	6	3	6^{7}	3
30	(South Korea) Yoon Yong-il	4	6	7^{9}	6

=== Fourth qualifier ===
First round
4	(France) Michaël Llodra	6	6^{19}	8
(Australia) Richard Fromberg	3	7^{21}	6
(France) Jean-François Bachelot	3	7^{7}	2
(United States) Brandon Hawk	6	6^{5}	6
(Sweden) Johan Settergren	3	6	7
(France) Thierry Guardiola	6	3	9
(Netherlands) Rogier Wassen	4	7^{7}	2
21	(Czech Republic) Jan Vacek	6	6^{4}	6

Second round
4	(France) Michaël Llodra	5	6	6
(United States) Brandon Hawk	7	4	4
(France) Thierry Guardiola	6	1	4^{r}
21	(Czech Republic) Jan Vacek	3	6	4

Qualifying competition
4	(France) Michaël Llodra	7^{7}	6	6
21	(Czech Republic) Jan Vacek	6^{5}	3	3

=== Fifth qualifier ===
First round
5	(Brazil) André Sá	6	2	6
(Czech Republic) Radek Štěpánek	4	6	3
(Israel) Lior Dahan	3	4
(Sweden) Patrik Fredriksson	6	6
(Australia) Scott Draper	6^{3}	6	8
WC	(United Kingdom) Nick Weal	7^{7}	1	6
(Spain) Óscar Burrieza	4	4
28	(United States) Hugo Armando	6	6

Second round
5	(Brazil) André Sá	6^{4}	6	6
(Sweden) Patrik Fredriksson	7^{7}	2	2
(Australia) Scott Draper	6	6
28	(United States) Hugo Armando	3	2

Qualifying competition
5	(Brazil) André Sá	4	7^{7}	6	2	4
(Australia) Scott Draper	6	6^{5}	0	6	6

=== Sixth qualifier ===
First round
6	(Switzerland) George Bastl	5	6^{5}
(Russia) Denis Golovanov	7	7^{7}
WC	(The Bahamas) Mark Knowles	3	4
(United States) Ronald Agénor	6	6
(Germany) Oliver Gross	7^{7}	6
(Austria) Oliver Marach	6^{1}	1
(United States) Mike Bryan	2	4
19	(United States) Taylor Dent	6	6

Second round
(Russia) Denis Golovanov	7^{7}	5	6
(United States) Ronald Agénor	6^{2}	7	4
(Germany) Oliver Gross	4	1
19	(United States) Taylor Dent	6	6

Qualifying competition
(Russia) Denis Golovanov	4	1	4
19	(United States) Taylor Dent	6	6	6

=== Seventh qualifier ===
First round
7	(Italy) Federico Luzzi	7^{7}	6^{6}	4
(United States) Alex O'Brien	6^{5}	7^{8}	6
(Austria) Zbynek Mlynarik	1	2
(Switzerland) Lorenzo Manta	6	6
(Bulgaria) Ivaylo Traykov	6^{5}	2
(India) Leander Paes	7^{7}	6
(Italy) Mosé Navarra	6	6
17	(Czech Republic) Ota Fukárek	2	1

Second round
(United States) Alex O'Brien	3	6	6
(Switzerland) Lorenzo Manta	6	3	3
(India) Leander Paes	7	6
(Italy) Mosé Navarra	5	1

Qualifying competition
(United States) Alex O'Brien	7^{7}	3	2	2
(India) Leander Paes	6^{5}	6	6	6

=== Eighth qualifier ===
First round
8	(Germany) Christian Vinck	6	6
WC	(United Kingdom) James Nelson	3	4
(United States) Jeff Salzenstein	6	3	7
(Italy) Marco Meneschincheri	1	6	5
(South Africa) Wesley Moodie	5	4
(France) Stéphane Huet	7	6
(Brazil) Daniel Melo	6	2	4
18	(France) Cyril Saulnier	4	6	6

Second round
8	(Germany) Christian Vinck	6	3	4
(United States) Jeff Salzenstein	3	6	6
(France) Stéphane Huet	6	6
18	(France) Cyril Saulnier	4	2

Qualifying competition
(United States) Jeff Salzenstein	2	4	2
(France) Stéphane Huet	6	6	6

=== Ninth qualifier ===
First round
9	(Canada) Sébastien Lareau	6^{5}	7	2
(Japan) Gouichi Motomura	7^{7}	5	6
(Czech Republic) Robin Vik	1	3
(Germany) Michael Kohlmann	6	6
(Italy) Stefano Pescosolido	2	3
WC	(United Kingdom) Luke Milligan	6	6
(Czech Republic) František Čermák	4	1
23	(Georgia (country)) Irakli Labadze	6	6

Second round
(Japan) Gouichi Motomura	3	6	7
(Germany) Michael Kohlmann	6	3	9
WC	(United Kingdom) Luke Milligan	6	6^{5}	6
23	(Georgia (country)) Irakli Labadze	1	7^{7}	4

Qualifying competition
(Germany) Michael Kohlmann	7	6	5	5	3
WC	(United Kingdom) Luke Milligan	5	2	7	7	6

=== Tenth qualifier ===
First round
10	(Belgium) Dick Norman	6	3	16
(Israel) Andy Ram	3	6	18
(Sweden) Johan Örtegren	6^{3}	6	6
WC	(United Kingdom) Rhys Hanger	7^{7}	3	4
(Pakistan) Aisam-ul-Haq Qureshi	6	6
WC	(United Kingdom) Simon Dickson	1	3
(Australia) Todd Woodbridge	7	6
29	(Germany) Axel Pretzsch	5	3

Second round
(Israel) Andy Ram	2	6	4
(Sweden) Johan Örtegren	6	2	6
(Pakistan) Aisam-ul-Haq Qureshi	7^{7}	2	4
(Australia) Todd Woodbridge	6^{3}	6	6

Qualifying competition
(Sweden) Johan Örtegren	0	0	0
(Australia) Todd Woodbridge	6	6	6

=== Eleventh qualifier ===
First round
11	(Thailand) Paradorn Srichaphan	6	7
(Norway) Jan Frode Andersen	3	5
(Israel) Noam Okun	6	6^{5}	6
(Italy) Giorgio Galimberti	3	7^{7}	1
(Mexico) Alejandro Hernández	4	6	6
(Chile) Adrián García	6	2	4
WC	(United Kingdom) James Smith	6^{10}	6	5
32	(Austria) Julian Knowle	7^{12}	3	7

Second round
11	(Thailand) Paradorn Srichaphan	7	6
(Israel) Noam Okun	5	4
(Mexico) Alejandro Hernández	1	3
32	(Austria) Julian Knowle	6	6

Qualifying competition
11	(Thailand) Paradorn Srichaphan	7^{10}	6	4	4	3
32	(Austria) Julian Knowle	6^{8}	4	6	6	6

=== Twelfth qualifier ===
First round
12	(United States) Bob Bryan	6	6
(Paraguay) Ramón Delgado	2	3
(Spain) Salvador Navarro	6	3	6
(Italy) Leonardo Azzaro	4	6	3
(Slovakia) Ján Krošlák	6	6
(Argentina) Diego Hipperdinger	1	2
(United States) Mardy Fish	3	6	12
31	(Italy) Vincenzo Santopadre	6	3	10

Second round
12	(United States) Bob Bryan	6	6
(Spain) Salvador Navarro	3	0
(Slovakia) Ján Krošlák	6	1	7
(United States) Mardy Fish	3	6	9

Qualifying competition
12	(United States) Bob Bryan	6	7^{8}	4	6
(United States) Mardy Fish	3	6^{6}	6	3

=== Thirteenth qualifier ===
First round
13	(South Africa) Neville Godwin	6	6
(Azerbaijan) Emin Ağayev	3	4
WC	(United Kingdom) James Davidson	6	6
(Slovakia) Ladislav Švarc	2	2
(Finland) Tuomas Ketola	6	6
(Germany) Björn Phau	1	2
(United States) Glenn Weiner	6^{7}	6^{2}
27	(Germany) Marc-Kevin Goellner	7^{9}	7^{7}

Second round
13	(South Africa) Neville Godwin	6	6
WC	(United Kingdom) James Davidson	1	2
(Finland) Tuomas Ketola	7	6
27	(Germany) Marc-Kevin Goellner	5	4

Qualifying competition
13	(South Africa) Neville Godwin	6	6	6
(Finland) Tuomas Ketola	1	4	4

=== Fourteenth qualifier ===
First round
14	(Chile) Fernando González	3	4
(Canada) Simon Larose	6	6
(Italy) Stefano Galvani	1	5
(Russia) Artem Derepasko	6	7
(Argentina) Patricio Arquez	5	3
(France) Cedric Kauffmann	7	6
(United States) Michael Joyce	7^{7}	6^{5}	3
25	(Japan) Takao Suzuki	6^{5}	7^{7}	6

Second round
(Canada) Simon Larose	4	4
(Russia) Artem Derepasko	6	6
(France) Cedric Kauffmann	6	6
25	(Japan) Takao Suzuki	2	2

Qualifying competition
(Russia) Artem Derepasko	6	1	6	3	6
(France) Cedric Kauffmann	2	6	3	6	3

=== Fifteenth qualifier ===
First round
15	(Switzerland) Ivo Heuberger	6	6
(Argentina) Martín Rodríguez	1	4
(France) Olivier Mutis	5	4
(Germany) Alexander Waske	7	6
(United States) Eric Taino	7	2	2
(Slovenia) Marko Tkalec	5	6	6
(Republic of Ireland) Scott Barron	3	3
26	(Zimbabwe) Wayne Black	6	6

Second round
15	(Switzerland) Ivo Heuberger	3	6	7
(Germany) Alexander Waske	6	2	5
(Slovenia) Marko Tkalec	2	3
26	(Zimbabwe) Wayne Black	6	6

Qualifying competition
15	(Switzerland) Ivo Heuberger	4	7	6	6^{6}	6
26	(Zimbabwe) Wayne Black	6	5	1	7^{8}	3

=== Sixteenth qualifier ===
First round
16	(France) Nicolas Coutelot	6	3	4
(Sweden) Fredrik Jonsson	2	6	6
(Croatia) Ivan Vajda	6	6
(Italy) Elia Grossi	4	2
(Czech Republic) Jan Hernych	1	7^{7}	3
(Indonesia) Suwandi Suwandi	6	6^{3}	6
(South Africa) Justin Bower	3	7	6
24	(United States) Kevin Kim	6	5	3

Second round
(Sweden) Fredrik Jonsson	6	7^{7}
(Croatia) Ivan Vajda	4	6^{3}
(Indonesia) Suwandi Suwandi	4	4
(South Africa) Justin Bower	6	6

Qualifying competition
(Sweden) Fredrik Jonsson	6^{2}	7^{8}	6	6
(South Africa) Justin Bower	7^{7}	6^{6}	3	4
