= 2001 Wimbledon Championships – Men's doubles qualifying =

Men's doubles qualifying
- 2001 Wimbledon Championships

Events
Singles	men	women		boys	girls
Doubles	men	women	mixed	boys	girls
WC Singles	men	women	quad
WC Doubles	men	women	quad
Legends	men	women	seniors

Qualification
Singles	men	women
Doubles	men	women
- Wimbledon Championships

Players and pairs who neither have high enough rankings nor receive wild cards may participate in a qualifying tournament held one week before the annual Wimbledon Tennis Championships.

== Seeds ==
1. (Switzerland) Ivo Heuberger / (Germany) Michael Kohlmann (first round)
2. (Australia) Nathan Healey / (Australia) Jordan Kerr (qualifying competition)
3. (Brazil) Daniel Melo / (Brazil) Alexandre Simoni (first round)
4. (United States) James Blake / (The Bahamas) Mark Merklein (qualified)
5. (Netherlands) Sander Groen / (Germany) Alexander Waske (first round)
6. (Israel) Jonathan Erlich / (Israel) Andy Ram (qualified)
7. (Brazil) Antonio Prieto / (Brazil) André Sá (first round)
8. (South Africa) Marcos Ondruska / (South Africa) Damien Roberts (qualifying competition)

== Qualifiers ==
1. (United States) Brandon Hawk / (Australia) Grant Silcock
2. (Israel) Jonathan Erlich / (Israel) Andy Ram
3. (United States) Kevin Kim / (United States) Glenn Weiner
4. (United States) James Blake / (The Bahamas) Mark Merklein

== Qualifying draw ==
=== First qualifier ===
First round
1	(Switzerland) Ivo Heuberger (Germany) Michael Kohlmann	3	6^{4}
(Australia) Stephen Huss (Australia) Lee Pearson	6	7^{7}
(United States) Brandon Hawk (Australia) Grant Silcock	6	6
7	(Brazil) Antonio Prieto (Brazil) André Sá	3	4

Qualifying competition
(Australia) Stephen Huss (Australia) Lee Pearson	7^{7}	3	4	4
(United States) Brandon Hawk (Australia) Grant Silcock	6^{5}	6	6	6

=== Second qualifier ===
First round
2	(Australia) Nathan Healey (Australia) Jordan Kerr	6^{2}	6	6
(Switzerland) George Bastl (Georgia (country)) Irakli Labadze	7^{7}	4	4
(Finland) Tuomas Ketola (Pakistan) Aisam-ul-Haq Qureshi	6	3	3
6	(Israel) Jonathan Erlich (Israel) Andy Ram	4	6	6

Qualifying competition
2	(Australia) Nathan Healey (Australia) Jordan Kerr	6^{3}	3	5
6	(Israel) Jonathan Erlich (Israel) Andy Ram	7^{7}	6	7

=== Third qualifier ===
First round
3	(Brazil) Daniel Melo (Brazil) Alexandre Simoni	5	3
(Canada) Frédéric Niemeyer (Australia) Todd Perry	7	6
(United States) Kevin Kim (United States) Glenn Weiner	7^{7}	6
5	(Netherlands) Sander Groen (Germany) Alexander Waske	6^{3}	3

Qualifying competition
(Canada) Frédéric Niemeyer (Australia) Todd Perry	4	6^{13}	4
(United States) Kevin Kim (United States) Glenn Weiner	6	7^{15}	6

=== Fourth qualifier ===
First round
4	(United States) James Blake (The Bahamas) Mark Merklein	6	7
WC	(United Kingdom) Simon Dickson (United Kingdom) Mark Hilton	3	5
PR	(Italy) Mosé Navarra (Italy) Stefano Pescosolido	4	7^{7}	2
8	(South Africa) Marcos Ondruska (South Africa) Damien Roberts	6	6^{5}	6

Qualifying competition
4	(United States) James Blake (The Bahamas) Mark Merklein	6	6	6
8	(South Africa) Marcos Ondruska (South Africa) Damien Roberts	3	4	4
