= 2000 Neridé Prague Indoor – Doubles =

Doubles
- 2000 Neridé Prague Indoor

Final
- Champion: (Denmark) Kristian Pless (Pakistan) Aisam-ul-Haq Qureshi
- Runner-up: (Switzerland) Ivo Heuberger (Finland) Ville Liukko
- Score: 6–4, 6–4

Events
Singles	Doubles
- Neridé Prague Indoor

This was the first edition of the event.

Kristian Pless and Aisam-ul-Haq Qureshi won the title, defeating Ivo Heuberger and Ville Liukko 6–4, 6–4 in the final.

== Seeds ==
1. (Romania) Ionuț Moldovan / (Russia) Yuri Schukin (quarterfinals)
2. (Czech Republic) František Čermák / (Czech Republic) Ota Fukárek (first round)
3. (Czech Republic) Petr Luxa / (Czech Republic) David Škoch (second round)
4. (Switzerland) Ivo Heuberger / (Finland) Ville Liukko (final)

== Draw ==
Key

- Q = Qualifier
- WC = Wild card
- LL = Lucky loser
- Alt = Alternate
- ITF = ITF entry
- PR = Protected ranking
- SR = Special ranking
- SE = Special exempt
- JE = Junior exempt
- JR = Junior Accelerator Programme entrant
- CO = College Accelerator Programme entrant
- NG = Next Gen Accelerator Program entrant
- w/o = Walkover
- r = Retired
- d = Defaulted

First round
1	(Romania) Ionuț Moldovan (Russia) Yuri Schukin	6	7
(Czech Republic) Tomáš Cakl (Czech Republic) Ondřej Chvapil	2	5
(Netherlands) D van Scheppingen (Czech Republic) Tomáš Zíb	7	6^{4}	6
(Czech Republic) Jan Hernych (Czech Republic) Pavel Kudrnáč	6^{6}	7	1
4	(Switzerland) Ivo Heuberger (Finland) Ville Liukko	6	6
(Italy) Leonardo Azzaro (Switzerland) M Chiudinelli	4	2
(Czech Republic) Lukáš Dlouhý (Czech Republic) Radovan Svetlík	5	6	7
(Germany) Franz Stauder (Germany) U Tippenhauer	7	4	5
(Czech Republic) Petr Dezort (Czech Republic) Martin Štěpánek	6^{8}	6	6
(Croatia) Ivo Karlović (Czech Republic) Josef Nesticky	7	3	4
(Czech Republic) Igor Brukner (Slovakia) Martin Hromec	6	6
3	(Czech Republic) Petr Luxa (Czech Republic) David Škoch	4	4
(Denmark) Kristian Pless (Pakistan) Aisam-ul-Haq Qureshi	6	6
(United States) Kelly Gullett (Netherlands) D Sistermans	3	3
(Czech Republic) Petr Korda (Czech Republic) Cyril Suk	3	7	7
2	(Czech Republic) František Čermák (Czech Republic) Ota Fukárek	6	6^{5}	6^{3}

Quarterfinals
1	(Romania) Ionuț Moldovan (Russia) Yuri Schukin	6^{6}	6^{4}
(Netherlands) D van Scheppingen (Czech Republic) Tomáš Zíb	7	7
4	(Switzerland) Ivo Heuberger (Finland) Ville Liukko	6	7
(Czech Republic) Lukáš Dlouhý (Czech Republic) Radovan Svetlík	3	5
(Czech Republic) Petr Dezort (Czech Republic) Martin Štěpánek	4	4
(Czech Republic) Igor Brukner (Slovakia) Martin Hromec	6	6
(Denmark) Kristian Pless (Pakistan) Aisam-ul-Haq Qureshi	6	7
(Czech Republic) Petr Korda (Czech Republic) Cyril Suk	4	6^{3}

Semifinals
(Netherlands) D van Scheppingen (Czech Republic) Tomáš Zíb	7	4	6^{5}
4	(Switzerland) Ivo Heuberger (Finland) Ville Liukko	6^{3}	6	7
(Czech Republic) Igor Brukner (Slovakia) Martin Hromec
(Denmark) Kristian Pless (Pakistan) Aisam-ul-Haq Qureshi	w/o

Finals
4	(Switzerland) Ivo Heuberger (Finland) Ville Liukko	4	4
(Denmark) Kristian Pless (Pakistan) Aisam-ul-Haq Qureshi	6	6
