= 2001 Wimbledon Championships – Women's doubles qualifying =

Women's doubles qualifying
- 2001 Wimbledon Championships

Events
Singles	men	women		boys	girls
Doubles	men	women	mixed	boys	girls
WC Singles	men	women	quad
WC Doubles	men	women	quad
Legends	men	women	seniors

Qualification
Singles	men	women
Doubles	men	women
- Wimbledon Championships

Players and pairs who neither have high enough rankings nor receive wild cards may participate in a qualifying tournament held one week before the annual Wimbledon Tennis Championships.

== Seeds ==
1. (Czech Republic) Eva Martincová / (Ukraine) Tatiana Perebiynis (qualified)
2. (Slovenia) Maja Matevžič / (Federal Republic of Yugoslavia) Dragana Zarić (qualified)
3. (Greece) Eleni Daniilidou / (Germany) Caroline Schneider (qualifying competition)
4. (China) Li Na / (Slovenia) Petra Rampre (first round)
5. (United States) Amanda Augustus / (United States) Jennifer Embry (qualified)
6. (Japan) Haruka Inoue / (Croatia) Maja Palaveršić (qualifying competition)
7. (Russia) Anastasia Myskina / (United States) Alexandra Stevenson (first round)
8. (Hungary) Zsófia Gubacsi / (Germany) Vanessa Henke (qualifying competition)

== Qualifiers ==
1. (Czech Republic) Eva Martincová / (Ukraine) Tatiana Perebiynis
2. (Slovenia) Maja Matevžič / (Federal Republic of Yugoslavia) Dragana Zarić
3. (United States) Amanda Augustus / (United States) Jennifer Embry
4. (United States) Dawn Buth / (South Africa) Natalie Grandin

== Qualifying draw ==
=== First qualifier ===
First round
1	(Czech Republic) Eva Martincová (Ukraine) Tatiana Perebiynis	6	6
(Netherlands) Amanda Hopmans (Austria) Marion Maruska	3	3
(New Zealand) Shelley Stephens (Hong Kong) Tong Ka-po	6^{6}	6	2
6	(Japan) Haruka Inoue (Croatia) Maja Palaveršić	7^{8}	2	6

Qualifying competition
1	(Czech Republic) Eva Martincová (Ukraine) Tatiana Perebiynis	7^{7}	7^{7}
6	(Japan) Haruka Inoue (Croatia) Maja Palaveršić	6^{3}	6^{4}

=== Second qualifier ===
First round
2	(Slovenia) Maja Matevžič (Federal Republic of Yugoslavia) Dragana Zarić	6	7^{7}
(Argentina) Clarisa Fernández (Venezuela) Milagros Sequera	2	6^{4}
WC	(United Kingdom) Alice Barnes (United Kingdom) Jane O'Donoghue	2	6	6
8	(Hungary) Zsófia Gubacsi (Germany) Vanessa Henke	6	4	8

Qualifying competition
2	(Slovenia) Maja Matevžič (Federal Republic of Yugoslavia) Dragana Zarić	6	6
8	(Hungary) Zsófia Gubacsi (Germany) Vanessa Henke	1	1

=== Third qualifier ===
First round
3	(Greece) Eleni Daniilidou (Germany) Caroline Schneider	6	6
(Belarus) Nadejda Ostrovskaya (United States) Tara Snyder	2	4
(United States) Samantha Reeves (South Africa) Jessica Steck	6^{5}	2
5	(United States) Amanda Augustus (United States) Jennifer Embry	7^{7}	6

Qualifying competition
3	(Greece) Eleni Daniilidou (Germany) Caroline Schneider	5	1
5	(United States) Amanda Augustus (United States) Jennifer Embry	7	6

=== Fourth qualifier ===
First round
4	(China) Li Na (Slovenia) Petra Rampre	4	2
(United States) Dawn Buth (South Africa) Natalie Grandin	6	6
(Japan) Rika Fujiwara (South Korea) Kim Eun-ha	7	7^{7}
7	(Russia) Anastasia Myskina (United States) Alexandra Stevenson	5	6^{2}

Qualifying competition
(United States) Dawn Buth (South Africa) Natalie Grandin	6	7
(Japan) Rika Fujiwara (South Korea) Kim Eun-ha	4	5
