= 1999 Paegas Czech Open – Singles =

Singles
- 1999 Paegas Czech Open

Final
- Champion: (Slovakia) Dominik Hrbatý
- Runner-up: (Czech Republic) Ctislav Doseděl
- Score: 6–2, 6–2

Events
Singles	Doubles
← 1998 ·	Prague Open

The 1999 Paegas Czech Open was a men's tennis tournament played on Clay in Prague, Czech Republic that was part of the World Series of the 1999 ATP Tour. It was the thirteenth edition of the tournament and was held from 26 April – 2 May 1999.

== Seeds ==
The champion seed is indicated in bold text while text in italics indicates the round in which those seeds were eliminated.

1. (Russia) Yevgeny Kafelnikov (first round)
2. (Croatia) Goran Ivanišević (first round)
3. (France) Cédric Pioline (second round)
4. (Russia) Marat Safin (first round)
5. (Slovakia) **Dominik Hrbatý (champion)**
6. n/a
7. (Ecuador) Nicolás Lapentti (second round)
8. (Australia) Andrew Ilie (second round)

== Draw ==
=== Key ===
- Q = Qualifier
- WC = Wild card
- LL = Lucky loser
- Alt = Alternate
- SE = Special exempt
- PR = Protected ranking
- ITF = ITF entry
- JE = Junior exempt
- w/o = Walkover
- r = Retired
- d = Defaulted
- SR = Special ranking

=== Finals ===
Semifinals
(Czech Republic) Michal Tabara	1	5
5	**(Slovakia) Dominik Hrbatý**	**6**	**7**
**(Czech Republic) Ctislav Doseděl**	**7**	**6**
(Spain) Germán Puentes	5	2

Final
5	**(Slovakia) Dominik Hrbatý**	**6**	**6**
(Czech Republic) Ctislav Doseděl	2	2

=== Top half ===
First round
1	(Russia) Y Kafelnikov	4	**6**	4
**(Australia) R Fromberg**	**6**	2	**6**
**(Czech Republic) M Tabara**	**6**	**6**
(Czech Republic) R Štěpánek	4	1
**(Bulgaria) O Stanoytchev**	**6**	**6**
(Finland) V Liukko	2	3
7	**(Ecuador) N Lapentti**	**6**	**6**
(Czech Republic) R Světlík	0	4
3	**(France) C Pioline**	**7**	0	**7**
(Czech Republic) J Novák	6^{6}	**6**	6^{4}
**(Brazil) F Meligeni**	**6**	**6**
(Czech Republic) M Damm	2	1
**(Russia) A Cherkasov**	4	**6**	**6**
(Czech Republic) D Miketa	**6**	4	2
5	**(Slovakia) D Hrbatý**	**6**	**7**
(France) A Dupuis	3	5

Second round
(Australia) R Fromberg	3	3
**(Czech Republic) M Tabara**	**6**	**6**
**(Bulgaria) O Stanoytchev**	3	**7**	**6**
7	(Ecuador) N Lapentti	**6**	6^{3}	4
3	(France) C Pioline	0	**7**	1
**(Brazil) F Meligeni**	**6**	5	**6**
(Russia) A Cherkasov	**6**	0	3
5	**(Slovakia) D Hrbatý**	4	**6**	**6**

Quarterfinals
**(Czech Republic) M Tabara**	2	**6**	**6**
(Bulgaria) O Stanoytchev	**6**	3	1
(Brazil) F Meligeni	6^{2}	0
5	**(Slovakia) D Hrbatý**	**7**	**6**

Semifinals
(Czech Republic) M Tabara	1	5
5	**(Slovakia) D Hrbatý**	**6**	**7**

=== Bottom half ===
First round
**(Spain) F Vicente**	**6**	**6**
(Finland) T Ketola	1	3
**(Czech Republic) C Doseděl**	**7**	**6**
(South Africa) D Nainkin	6^{5}	4
**(France) A Di Pasquale**	**6**	**6**
(Germany) J Knippschild	3	0
**(Czech Republic) T Zíb**	1	**6**	**7**
4	(Russia) M Safin	**6**	1	5
8	**(Australia) A Ilie**	**6**	**6**
(Argentina) A Prieto	2	4
**(Spain) G Puentes**	**6**	**6**
(United States) J Tarango	2	1
**(Spain) E Nicolás**	**6**	**6**
(Slovakia) J Krošlák	2	0
**(Germany) M Hantschk**	6^{4}	**6**	**6**
2	(Croatia) G Ivanišević	**7**	2	4

Second round
(Spain) F Vicente	6^{4}	4
**(Czech Republic) C Doseděl**	**7**	**6**
**(France) A Di Pasquale**	**6**	**6**
(Czech Republic) T Zíb	4	1
8	(Australia) A Ilie	**6**	1	1
**(Spain) G Puentes**	1	**6**	**6**
**(Spain) E Nicolás**	**6**	**6**
(Germany) M Hantschk	1	0

Quarterfinals
**(Czech Republic) C Doseděl**	**7**	2	**7**
(France) A Di Pasquale	6^{6}	**6**	5
**(Spain) G Puentes**	**6**	**6**
(Spain) E Nicolás	1	2

Semifinals
**(Czech Republic) C Doseděl**	**7**	**6**
(Spain) G Puentes	5	2
