= 2002 Neridé Prague Indoor – Doubles =

Doubles
- 2002 Neridé Prague Indoor

Final
- Champion: (Slovakia) Karol Beck (Czech Republic) Jaroslav Levinský
- Runner-up: (North Macedonia) Aleksandar Kitinov (Croatia) Lovro Zovko
- Score: 7–5, 6–2

Events
Singles	Doubles
- Neridé Prague Indoor

This was the third edition of the event.

Lukáš Dlouhý and David Miketa, 2001 winners, participated but lost in quarterfinals to the eventual champions.

Karol Beck and Jaroslav Levinský won the title, defeating Aleksandar Kitinov and Lovro Zovko 7–5, 6–2 in the final.

Karol Beck was the runner-up of the previous edition.

== Seeds ==
1. (Czech Republic) Ota Fukárek / (United States) Jim Thomas (semifinals)
2. (Switzerland) Yves Allegro / (Switzerland) George Bastl (semifinals)
3. (Slovakia) Karol Beck / (Czech Republic) Jaroslav Levinský (champion)
4. (North Macedonia) Aleksandar Kitinov / (Croatia) Lovro Zovko (final)

== Draw ==
Key

- Q = Qualifier
- WC = Wild card
- LL = Lucky loser
- Alt = Alternate
- ITF = ITF entry
- PR = Protected ranking
- SR = Special ranking
- SE = Special exempt
- JE = Junior exempt
- JR = Junior Accelerator Programme entrant
- CO = College Accelerator Programme entrant
- NG = Next Gen Accelerator Program entrant
- w/o = Walkover
- r = Retired
- d = Defaulted

First round
1	(Czech Republic) Ota Fukárek (United States) Jim Thomas	7	6
(Hungary) Kornel Bardoczky (Serbia) Boris Pašanski	5	4
(Czech Republic) Robin Vik (Czech Republic) Tomáš Zíb	6	6
(Czech Republic) Jakub Hasek (Czech Republic) Josef Nesticky	3	2
3	(Slovakia) Karol Beck (Czech Republic) J Levinský	6	6
(United Kingdom) Lee Childs (United Kingdom) Jonathan Marray	2	4
(Czech Republic) Lukáš Dlouhý (Czech Republic) David Miketa	6	6
(Czech Republic) Marek Dvorak (Czech Republic) Daniel Macko	1	1
(Czech Republic) Petr Kovačka (Czech Republic) Adam Vejmelka	6	6
(Romania) Victor Hănescu (Russia) Dmitri Vlasov	2	4
4	(North Macedonia) A Kitinov (Croatia) Lovro Zovko	2	6	6
(Israel) Jonathan Erlich (Austria) Werner Eschauer	6	3	4
(Sweden) Bjorn Rehnquist (Sweden) Robin Söderling	6	6
(Czech Republic) Vaclav Duda (Czech Republic) Petr Kralert	4	2
2	(Switzerland) Yves Allegro (Switzerland) George Bastl	6	6
(Czech Republic) Theodor Devoty (Czech Republic) Karel Jilek	2	2

Quarterfinals
1	(Czech Republic) Ota Fukárek (United States) Jim Thomas	7	6^{3}	6
(Czech Republic) Robin Vik (Czech Republic) Tomáš Zíb	6^{6}	7	4
3	(Slovakia) Karol Beck (Czech Republic) J Levinský	6	4	6
(Czech Republic) Lukáš Dlouhý (Czech Republic) David Miketa	4	6	4
(Czech Republic) Petr Kovačka (Czech Republic) Adam Vejmelka	3	2r
4	(North Macedonia) A Kitinov (Croatia) Lovro Zovko	6	3
(Sweden) Bjorn Rehnquist (Sweden) Robin Söderling
2	(Switzerland) Yves Allegro (Switzerland) George Bastl	W-O

Semifinals
1	(Czech Republic) Ota Fukárek (United States) Jim Thomas	6^{3}	4
3	(Slovakia) Karol Beck (Czech Republic) J Levinský	7	6
4	(North Macedonia) A Kitinov (Croatia) Lovro Zovko	W-O
2	(Switzerland) Yves Allegro (Switzerland) George Bastl

Finals
3	(Slovakia) Karol Beck (Czech Republic) J Levinský	7	6
4	(North Macedonia) A Kitinov (Croatia) Lovro Zovko	5	2
