= 2001 Wimbledon Championships – Women's singles qualifying =

Women's singles qualifying
- 2001 Wimbledon Championships

Events
Singles	men	women		boys	girls
Doubles	men	women	mixed	boys	girls
WC Singles	men	women	quad
WC Doubles	men	women	quad
Legends	men	women	seniors

Qualification
Singles	men	women
Doubles	men	women
- Wimbledon Championships

Players and pairs who neither have high enough rankings nor receive wild cards may participate in a qualifying tournament held one week before the annual Wimbledon Tennis Championships.

== Seeds ==
1. (Chinese Taipei) Janet Lee (qualifying competition, lucky loser)
2. (Hungary) Zsófia Gubacsi (first round)
3. (Indonesia) Wynne Prakusya (qualified)
4. (Netherlands) Seda Noorlander (first round)
5. (Germany) Anca Barna (qualified)
6. (Russia) Alina Jidkova (qualifying competition)
7. (Czech Republic) Alena Vašková (first round)
8. (Hungary) Anikó Kapros (second round)
9. (Germany) Miriam Schnitzer (qualified)
10. (Netherlands) Kristie Boogert (qualified)
11. (Germany) Gréta Arn (first round)
12. (Federal Republic of Yugoslavia) Sandra Načuk (first round)
13. (Japan) Saori Obata (qualifying competition)
14. (Belgium) Els Callens (first round)
15. (Slovenia) Katarina Srebotnik (first round)
16. (Czech Republic) Klára Koukalová (second round)
17. (Croatia) Maja Palaveršić (first round)
18. (Czech Republic) Lenka Němečková (first round)
19. (Austria) Patricia Wartusch (first round)
20. (Italy) Adriana Serra Zanetti (qualified)
21. (Belarus) Nadejda Ostrovskaya (first round)
22. (Japan) Yuka Yoshida (qualifying competition)
23. (Japan) Rika Fujiwara (first round)
24. (Belgium) Laurence Courtois (second round)

== Qualifiers ==
1. (France) Stéphanie Foretz
2. (Italy) Adriana Serra Zanetti
3. (Indonesia) Wynne Prakusya
4. (Greece) Eleni Daniilidou
5. (Germany) Anca Barna
6. (United Kingdom) Karen Cross
7. (Argentina) Clarisa Fernández
8. (Canada) Maureen Drake
9. (Germany) Miriam Schnitzer
10. (Netherlands) Kristie Boogert
11. (Austria) Barbara Schwartz
12. (Slovenia) Maja Matevžič

== Lucky loser ==
1. (Chinese Taipei) Janet Lee

== Qualifying draw ==
=== First qualifier ===
First round
1	(Chinese Taipei) Janet Lee	6	6
(Russia) Anastasia Rodionova	2	3
(Australia) Lisa McShea	7^{7}	6
(Denmark) Eva Dyrberg	6^{5}	4
(France) Stéphanie Foretz	0	7^{7}	6
(Germany) Sabine Klaschka	6	6^{3}	1
WC	(United Kingdom) Jane O'Donoghue	6	6
17	(Croatia) Maja Palaveršić	1	1

Second round
1	(Chinese Taipei) Janet Lee	6	3	7
(Australia) Lisa McShea	3	6	5
(France) Stéphanie Foretz	6	6
WC	(United Kingdom) Jane O'Donoghue	3	1

Qualifying competition
1	(Chinese Taipei) Janet Lee	4	5
(France) Stéphanie Foretz	6	7

=== Second qualifier ===
First round
2	(Hungary) Zsófia Gubacsi	4	1
(United States) Mashona Washington	6	6
(China) Yi Jing-Qian	6	7
(Czech Republic) Eva Martincová	4	5
(United States) Tara Snyder	6	2	6
(France) Camille Pin	2	6	0
(France) Sophie Georges	1	0^{r}
20	(Italy) Adriana Serra Zanetti	6	1

Second round
(United States) Mashona Washington	6^{3}	1
(China) Yi Jing-Qian	7^{7}	6
(United States) Tara Snyder	4	4
20	(Italy) Adriana Serra Zanetti	6	6

Qualifying competition
(China) Yi Jing-Qian	4	4
20	(Italy) Adriana Serra Zanetti	6	6

=== Third qualifier ===
First round
3	(Indonesia) Wynne Prakusya	6	6
(Italy) Valentina Sassi	1	2
(Italy) Gloria Pizzichini	6	7^{7}
(Federal Republic of Yugoslavia) Dragana Zarić	2	6^{4}
(Slovakia) Lenka Dlhopolcová	4	7^{7}	6
WC	(United Kingdom) Joanne Ward	6	6^{5}	2
(Bulgaria) Desislava Topalova	2	4
24	(Belgium) Laurence Courtois	6	6

Second round
3	(Indonesia) Wynne Prakusya	6	6
(Italy) Gloria Pizzichini	2	3
(Slovakia) Lenka Dlhopolcová	6	1	6
24	(Belgium) Laurence Courtois	3	6	1

Qualifying competition
3	(Indonesia) Wynne Prakusya	6	6
(Slovakia) Lenka Dlhopolcová	3	1

=== Fourth qualifier ===
First round
4	(Netherlands) Seda Noorlander	5	4
(Greece) Eleni Daniilidou	7	6
(Germany) Vanessa Henke	6	3	6
(Czech Republic) Zuzana Ondrášková	4	6	0
WC	(United Kingdom) Helen Crook	6	2	6
(United States) Tracy Almeda-Singian	2	6	4
WC	(United Kingdom) Alice Barnes	1	6^{3}
13	(Japan) Saori Obata	6	7^{7}

Second round
(Greece) Eleni Daniilidou	6	6
(Germany) Vanessa Henke	0	2
WC	(United Kingdom) Helen Crook	2	6^{6}
13	(Japan) Saori Obata	6	7^{8}

Qualifying competition
(Greece) Eleni Daniilidou	7^{7}	6
13	(Japan) Saori Obata	6^{5}	3

=== Fifth qualifier ===
First round
5	(Germany) Anca Barna	6	6
(Australia) Bryanne Stewart	1	3
WC	(United Kingdom) Amanda Janes	6	7
(Romania) Cătălina Cristea	1	5
(India) Nirupama Vaidyanathan	2	6	6
(Croatia) Mirjana Lučić	6	0	4
(Slovenia) Petra Rampre	5	6^{2}
16	(Czech Republic) Klára Koukalová	7	7^{7}

Second round
5	(Germany) Anca Barna	6	6
WC	(United Kingdom) Amanda Janes	3	1
(India) Nirupama Vaidyanathan	6	6
16	(Czech Republic) Klára Koukalová	4	2

Qualifying competition
5	(Germany) Anca Barna	7^{7}	6
(India) Nirupama Vaidyanathan	6^{3}	2

=== Sixth qualifier ===
First round
6	(Russia) Alina Jidkova	6^{4}	6	6
(Germany) Angelika Bachmann	7^{7}	4	1
(Austria) Marion Maruska	6	7
(Hungary) Katalin Marosi-Aracama	3	5
(Venezuela) Milagros Sequera	6	4	6
(Canada) Renata Kolbovic	4	6	4
WC	(United Kingdom) Karen Cross	6	6
21	(Belarus) Nadejda Ostrovskaya	3	2

Second round
6	(Russia) Alina Jidkova	5	6	6
(Austria) Marion Maruska	7	3	3
(Venezuela) Milagros Sequera	1	0
WC	(United Kingdom) Karen Cross	6	6

Qualifying competition
6	(Russia) Alina Jidkova	5	3
WC	(United Kingdom) Karen Cross	7	6

=== Seventh qualifier ===
First round
7	(Czech Republic) Alena Vašková	0	5
(Ukraine) Elena Tatarkova	6	7
(Australia) Annabel Ellwood	5	6	3
(Czech Republic) Eva Krejčová	7	1	6
(South Korea) Cho Yoon-jeong	6	6
(Spain) Gisela Riera	3	3
(Argentina) Clarisa Fernández	2	6	6
19	(Austria) Patricia Wartusch	6	2	2

Second round
(Ukraine) Elena Tatarkova	5	6	6
(Czech Republic) Eva Krejčová	7	4	0
(South Korea) Cho Yoon-jeong	5	0
(Argentina) Clarisa Fernández	7	6

Qualifying competition
(Ukraine) Elena Tatarkova	6^{4}	2
(Argentina) Clarisa Fernández	7^{7}	6

=== Eighth qualifier ===
First round
8	(Hungary) Anikó Kapros	6^{5}	7^{10}	6
(France) Laurence Andretto	7^{7}	6^{8}	3
(France) Alexandra Fusai	7^{7}	4	6
(Australia) Kerry-Anne Guse	6^{5}	6	2
(Ukraine) Tatiana Perebiynis	7	0	6
(United States) Erika deLone	5	6	3
(Canada) Maureen Drake	6	6
14	(Belgium) Els Callens	2	3

Second round
8	(Hungary) Anikó Kapros	4	6	4
(France) Alexandra Fusai	6	3	6
(Ukraine) Tatiana Perebiynis	3	4
(Canada) Maureen Drake	6	6

Qualifying competition
(France) Alexandra Fusai	3	3
(Canada) Maureen Drake	6	6

=== Ninth qualifier ===
First round
9	(Germany) Miriam Schnitzer	3	6	6
(Italy) Antonella Serra Zanetti	6	3	0
(France) Lea Ghirardi	6	6
(Luxembourg) Claudine Schaul	4	3
(Kazakhstan) Irina Selyutina	6	6
(Netherlands) Amanda Hopmans	2	2
(Hungary) Kira Nagy	3	6	6
23	(Japan) Rika Fujiwara	6	4	4

Second round
9	(Germany) Miriam Schnitzer	6	7
(France) Lea Ghirardi	1	5
(Kazakhstan) Irina Selyutina	6	6
(Hungary) Kira Nagy	3	1

Qualifying competition
9	(Germany) Miriam Schnitzer	6	7^{7}
(Kazakhstan) Irina Selyutina	4	6^{3}

=== Tenth qualifier ===
First round
10	(Netherlands) Kristie Boogert	6	1	6
(China) Li Na	1	6	1
(Bulgaria) Antoaneta Pandjerova	5	4
WC	(United Kingdom) Cristelle Grier	7	6
(Italy) Laura Golarsa	3	1
(Italy) Nathalie Viérin	6	6
(Canada) Marie-Ève Pelletier	1	3
22	(Japan) Yuka Yoshida	6	6

Second round
10	(Netherlands) Kristie Boogert	6	6
WC	(United Kingdom) Cristelle Grier	3	2
(Italy) Nathalie Viérin	2	4
22	(Japan) Yuka Yoshida	6	6

Qualifying competition
10	(Netherlands) Kristie Boogert	6	7^{7}
22	(Japan) Yuka Yoshida	4	6^{4}

=== Eleventh qualifier ===
First round
11	(Germany) Gréta Arn	2	4
(Austria) Barbara Schwartz	6	6
(Italy) Francesca Lubiani	2	6	6
(United States) Samantha Reeves	6	1	4
(Germany) Martina Müller	6	6
(Czech Republic) Michaela Paštiková	3	2
(Ukraine) Julia Vakulenko	7^{7}	6
15	(Slovenia) Katarina Srebotnik	6^{4}	4

Second round
(Austria) Barbara Schwartz	6	6
(Italy) Francesca Lubiani	3	3
(Germany) Martina Müller	2	6	6
(Ukraine) Julia Vakulenko	6	3	8

Qualifying competition
(Austria) Barbara Schwartz	6	6
(Ukraine) Julia Vakulenko	2	3

=== Twelfth qualifier ===
First round
12	(Federal Republic of Yugoslavia) Sandra Načuk	4	2
(Canada) Vanessa Webb	6	6
(Australia) Christina Wheeler	6	6
(South Korea) Kim Eun-ha	3	3
(Germany) Syna Schmidle	3	6	10
(Slovenia) Maja Matevžič	6	0	12
WC	(United Kingdom) Rachel Viollet	6	7^{7}
18	(Czech Republic) Lenka Němečková	1	6^{4}

Second round
(Canada) Vanessa Webb	4	6	6
(Australia) Christina Wheeler	6	0	4
(Slovenia) Maja Matevžič	6	7^{8}
WC	(United Kingdom) Rachel Viollet	4	6^{6}

Qualifying competition
(Canada) Vanessa Webb	2	2
(Slovenia) Maja Matevžič	6	6
