= 2000 Neridé Prague Indoor – Singles =

Singles
- 2000 Neridé Prague Indoor

Final
- Champion: (Czech Republic) Jan Vacek
- Runner-up: (Switzerland) Ivo Heuberger
- Score: 6^{(7–9)}–7, 7–5, 6–3

Events
Singles	Doubles
- Neridé Prague Indoor

This was the first edition of the event.

Jan Vacek won in the final 6^{(7–9)}–7, 7–5, 6–3 against Ivo Heuberger.

== Seeds ==
1. (Czech Republic) Tomáš Zíb (first round)
2. (Czech Republic) Petr Luxa (quarterfinals)
3. (Denmark) Kristian Pless (second round)
4. (Netherlands) Dennis van Scheppingen (second round)
5. (Russia) Yuri Schukin (quarterfinals)
6. (Czech Republic) František Čermák (quarterfinals)
7. (Czech Republic) Jan Vacek (champion)
8. (Slovakia) Ladislav Švarc (second round)

== Draw ==
Key

- Q = Qualifier
- WC = Wild card
- LL = Lucky loser
- Alt = Alternate
- ITF = ITF entry
- PR = Protected ranking
- SR = Special ranking
- SE = Special exempt
- JE = Junior exempt
- JR = Junior Accelerator Programme entrant
- CO = College Accelerator Programme entrant
- NG = Next Gen Accelerator Program entrant
- w/o = Walkover
- r = Retired
- d = Defaulted

=== Finals ===
Semifinals
(Czech Republic) Ota Fukárek	6^{3}	6	6^{5}
(Switzerland) Ivo Heuberger	7	2	7
(Czech Republic) Jan Hernych	5	6	5
7	(Czech Republic) Jan Vacek	7	2	7

Final
(Switzerland) Ivo Heuberger	7	5	3
7	(Czech Republic) Jan Vacek	6^{8}	7	6

=== Top half ===
First round
(Croatia) Ivo Karlović	7	6^{4}	7
1	(Czech Republic) Tomáš Zíb	6^{3}	7	6^{5}
(Bulgaria) Ivaylo Traykov	6	6^{9}	6
(Austria) H Wiltschnig	1	7	4
(Czech Republic) Ota Fukárek	6	6
(Romania) Ionuț Moldovan	4	0
8	(Slovakia) Ladislav Švarc	7	6
(Socialist Federal Republic of Yugoslavia) R Dulić Fišer	6^{6}	4
3	(Denmark) Kristian Pless	6	6
(Slovakia) Boris Borgula	3	4
(Switzerland) Ivo Heuberger	6	4	7
(Italy) Leonardo Azzaro	3	6	6^{4}
(Austria) Philipp Mullner	6	6
(Czech Republic) Ondřej Chvapil	0	4
5	(Russia) Yuri Schukin	6	6
(Germany) Jan Boruszewski	1	2

Second round
(Croatia) Ivo Karlović	3	7	6
(Bulgaria) Ivaylo Traykov	6	5	2
(Czech Republic) Ota Fukárek	6	6
8	(Slovakia) Ladislav Švarc	2	2
3	(Denmark) Kristian Pless	6^{4}	0
(Switzerland) Ivo Heuberger	7	6
(Austria) Philipp Mullner	0	0
5	(Russia) Yuri Schukin	6	6

Quarterfinals
(Croatia) Ivo Karlović	6^{5}	3
(Czech Republic) Ota Fukárek	7	6
(Switzerland) Ivo Heuberger	6	6
5	(Russia) Yuri Schukin	2	4

Semifinals
(Czech Republic) Ota Fukárek	6^{3}	6	6^{5}
(Switzerland) Ivo Heuberger	7	2	7

=== Bottom half ===
First round
6	(Czech Republic) František Čermák	7	6
(Finland) Ville Liukko	6^{5}	2
(Austria) Jürgen Melzer	6	6
(Republic of Ireland) Kevin Sorensen	3	2
(Czech Republic) Jan Hernych	6	6
(United States) Phillip King	2	4
4	(Netherlands) D van Scheppingen	7	6
(Czech Republic) Radim Žitko	5	2
7	(Czech Republic) Jan Vacek	6	6
(Switzerland) M Chiudinelli	4	2
(United Kingdom) Mark Hilton	6	6
(France) Dimitri Lorin	3	4
(Slovakia) Martin Hromec	4	6	7
(Czech Republic) Petr Korda	6	3	6^{2}
2	(Czech Republic) Petr Luxa	6^{4}	7	6
(Czech Republic) Lukáš Dlouhý	7	6^{4}	3

Second round
6	(Czech Republic) František Čermák	6	6
(Austria) Jürgen Melzer	4	2
(Czech Republic) Jan Hernych	7	6
4	(Netherlands) D van Scheppingen	5	0
7	(Czech Republic) Jan Vacek	6	6
(United Kingdom) Mark Hilton	4	3
(Slovakia) Martin Hromec	5	7	3
2	(Czech Republic) Petr Luxa	7	6^{8}	6

Quarterfinals
6	(Czech Republic) František Čermák	6	4	6^{3}
(Czech Republic) Jan Hernych	4	6	7
7	(Czech Republic) Jan Vacek	6^{4}	6	6
2	(Czech Republic) Petr Luxa	7	3	3

Semifinals
(Czech Republic) Jan Hernych	5	6	5
7	(Czech Republic) Jan Vacek	7	2	7
