= 2001 Neridé Prague Indoor – Singles =

Singles
- 2001 Neridé Prague Indoor

Final
- Champion: (Czech Republic) Ota Fukárek
- Runner-up: (Italy) Cristiano Caratti
- Score: 6–3, 6–3

Events
| Singles | Doubles |
- Neridé Prague Indoor

This was the second edition of the event.

Jan Vacek chose not to defend the title.

Ota Fukárek won in the final 6–3, 6–3 against Cristiano Caratti.

== Seeds ==
1. (Finland) Jarkko Nieminen (quarterfinals)
2. (Italy) Federico Luzzi (second round)
3. (Germany) Axel Pretzsch (second round)
4. (United Kingdom) Martin Lee (second round)
5. (Switzerland) George Bastl (second round)
6. (Czech Republic) Ota Fukárek (champion)
7. (Switzerland) Ivo Heuberger (first round)
8. (Netherlands) Peter Wessels (quarterfinals)

== Draw ==
Key

- Q = Qualifier
- WC = Wild card
- LL = Lucky loser
- Alt = Alternate
- ITF = ITF entry
- PR = Protected ranking
- SR = Special ranking
- SE = Special exempt
- JE = Junior exempt
- JR = Junior Accelerator Programme entrant
- CO = College Accelerator Programme entrant
- NG = Next Gen Accelerator Program entrant
- w/o = Walkover
- r = Retired
- d = Defaulted

=== Finals ===
Semifinals
(Italy) C Caratti | 6 | 3 | 7
(Czech Republic) Lukáš Dlouhý | 4 | 6 | 6^{5}
6 | (Czech Republic) Ota Fukárek | 6 | 6
(France) Grégory Carraz | 3 | 2

Final
(Italy) Cristiano Caratti | 3 | 3
6 | (Czech Republic) Ota Fukárek | 6 | 6

=== Top half ===
First round
1 | (Finland) Jarkko Nieminen | 6 | 7
(Czech Republic) Tomáš Zíb | 3 | 5
(Russia) Yuri Schukin | 6 | 6
(Netherlands) M op der Heijde | 3 | 4
(Italy) C Caratti | 6 | 7
(Netherlands) Martin Verkerk | 3 | 6^{6}
5 | (Switzerland) George Bastl | 6 | 6
(Czech Republic) Michal Navrátil | 2 | 4
3 | (Germany) Axel Pretzsch | 6 | 6
(Poland) Adam Chadaj | 4 | 2
(Czech Republic) Lukáš Dlouhý | 6 | 7
(Germany) Simon Greul | 3 | 6^{6}
(Slovakia) Ján Krošlák | 7 | 6
(Austria) Werner Eschauer | 6^{1} | 1
(Netherlands) Raemon Sluiter | 7 | 7
7 | (Switzerland) Ivo Heuberger | 6^{4} | 5

Second round
1 | (Finland) Jarkko Nieminen | 6 | 1 | 6
(Russia) Yuri Schukin | 4 | 6 | 1
(Italy) C Caratti | 2 | 6 | 6
5 | (Switzerland) George Bastl | 6 | 4 | 4
3 | (Germany) Axel Pretzsch | 6^{5} | 3
(Czech Republic) Lukáš Dlouhý | 7 | 6
(Slovakia) Ján Krošlák | 3 | 6 | 6
(Netherlands) Raemon Sluiter | 6 | 3 | 4

Quarterfinals
1 | (Finland) Jarkko Nieminen | 6 | 1 | 6^{2}
(Italy) C Caratti | 3 | 6 | 7
(Czech Republic) Lukáš Dlouhý | 6 | 6
(Slovakia) Ján Krošlák | 2 | 4

Semifinals
(Italy) C Caratti | 6 | 3 | 7
(Czech Republic) Lukáš Dlouhý | 4 | 6 | 6^{5}

=== Bottom half ===
First round
6 | (Czech Republic) Ota Fukárek | 6 | 6
(Germany) Denis Gremelmayr | 2 | 3
(Belgium) Reginald Willems | 7 | 6
(Czech Republic) Radim Žitko | 6^{3} | 3
(Germany) M-K Goellner | 7 | 6
(Slovakia) Karol Beck | 6^{4} | 3
4 | (United Kingdom) Martin Lee | 7 | 4 | 6
(Netherlands) Edwin Kempes | 6^{3} | 6 | 2
8 | (Netherlands) Peter Wessels | 6 | 3 | 6
(Czech Republic) Adam Vejmelka | 4 | 6 | 1
(Netherlands) Jan Siemerink | 3 | 7 | 6
(Sweden) Johan Settergren | 6 | 6^{8} | 3
(France) Grégory Carraz | 7 | 7
(Italy) Gianluca Pozzi | 6^{4} | 6^{2}
2 | (Italy) Federico Luzzi | 7 | 6
(Germany) Björn Phau | 5 | 2

Second round
6 | (Czech Republic) Ota Fukárek | 6 | 6
(Belgium) Reginald Willems | 3 | 2
(Germany) M-K Goellner | 6 | 4 | 6
4 | (United Kingdom) Martin Lee | 3 | 6 | 3
8 | (Netherlands) Peter Wessels | 6 | 6
(Netherlands) Jan Siemerink | 4 | 4
(France) Grégory Carraz | 6 | 6
2 | (Italy) Federico Luzzi | 2 | 3

Quarterfinals
6 | (Czech Republic) Ota Fukárek | 7 | 7
(Germany) M-K Goellner | 6^{4} | 6^{2}
8 | (Netherlands) Peter Wessels | 4 | 7 | 4
(France) Grégory Carraz | 6 | 6^{2} | 6

Semifinals
6 | (Czech Republic) Ota Fukárek | 6 | 6
(France) Grégory Carraz | 3 | 2
