= Neridé Prague Indoor =

Defunct tennis tournament
- Event name: Neridé Prague Indoor
- Founded: 2000
- Abolished: 2002
- Editions: 3
- Location: Průhonice, Czech Republic (2000-?)
- Category: ATP Challenger Series
- Surface: Hard (i)
- Draw: 32S / 32Q / 16D
- Prize money: $ 25,000+H

The Neridé Prague indoor was played on indoor hard courts. It was part of ATP Challenger Series. It was held at Průhonice, Prague in Czech Republic since 2000.

== Past finals ==
=== Men's singles ===
Year	Champion	Runner-up	Score
2000	(Czech Republic) Jan Vacek	(Switzerland) Ivo Heuberger	6^{(7–9)}–7, 7–5, 6–3
2001	(Czech Republic) Ota Fukárek	(Italy) Cristiano Caratti	6–3, 6–3
2002	(Croatia) Mario Ančić	(France) Jérôme Golmard	6–1, 6–1

=== Men's doubles ===
Year	Champions	Runners-up	Score
2000	(Denmark) Kristian Pless (Pakistan) Aisam-ul-Haq Qureshi	(Switzerland) Ivo Heuberger (Finland) Ville Liukko	6–4, 6–4
2001	(Czech Republic) Lukáš Dlouhý (Czech Republic) David Miketa	(Slovakia) Karol Beck (Slovakia) Igor Zelenay	6–1, 4–6, 6–3
2002	(Slovakia) Karol Beck (Czech Republic) Jaroslav Levinský	(North Macedonia) Aleksandar Kitinov (Croatia) Lovro Zovko	7–5, 6–2

== See also ==
- Czech Indoor Open
