= 1999 Paegas Czech Open – Doubles =

Tennis tournament

Doubles
- 1999 Paegas Czech Open

Final
- Champions: (Czech Republic) Martin Damm (Czech Republic) Radek Štěpánek
- Runners-up: (United States) Mark Keil (Ecuador) Nicolás Lapentti
- Score: 6–0, 6–2

Events
Singles	Doubles
- Prague Open

The 1999 Paegas Czech Open was a men's tennis tournament played on Clay in Prague, Czech Republic that was part of the World Series of the 1999 ATP Tour. It was the thirteenth edition of the tournament and was held from 26 April – 2 May 1999.

== Seeds ==
Champion seeds are indicated in bold text while text in italics indicates the round in which those seeds were eliminated.

1. (United States) Donald Johnson / (Czech Republic) Cyril Suk (semifinals)
2. (Czech Republic) Jiří Novák / (Czech Republic) David Rikl (quarterfinals)
3. (United States) Jared Palmer / (United States) Jeff Tarango (semifinals)
4. (South Africa) Chris Haggard / (Czech Republic) Pavel Vízner (first round)

== Draw ==
Key

- Q = Qualifier
- WC = Wild card
- LL = Lucky loser
- Alt = Alternate
- ITF = ITF entry
- PR = Protected ranking
- SR = Special ranking
- SE = Special exempt
- JE = Junior exempt
- JR = Junior Accelerator Programme entrant
- CO = College Accelerator Programme entrant
- NG = Next Gen Accelerator Program entrant
- w/o = Walkover
- r = Retired
- d = Defaulted

=== Finals ===
First round
1	(United States) **D Johnson** **(Czech Republic) C Suk**	**6**	3	**6**
(Spain) JI Carrasco (Spain) J Velasco Jr.	3	**6**	3
(Argentina) **M García** **(Argentina) S Prieto**	**6**	**6**
(Czech Republic) M Tabara (Czech Republic) T Zíb	2	0
(Czechoslovakia) **M Damm** **(Czech Republic) R Štěpánek**	**6**	3	**7**
4	(South Africa) C Haggard (Czech Republic) P Vízner	1	**6**	6
(Australia) **W Arthurs** **(Australia) A Kratzmann**	**6**	**6**
(Argentina) P Albano (Brazil) F Meligeni	3	4
(Spain) **E Nicolás** **(Spain) G Puentes**	**6**	**6**
(Finland) T Ketola (Czech Republic) F Pála	4	2
3	(United States) **J Palmer** **(United States) J Tarango**	**7**	**6**
(Russia) Y Kafelnikov (Russia) M Safin	5	2
(United States) **M Keil** **(Ecuador) N Lapentti**	3	**6**	**6**
(Italy) M Ardinghi (Netherlands) S Groen	**6**	3	3
2	(Czech Republic) **J Novák** **(Czech Republic) D Rikl**	**6**	4	**6**
(Czech Republic) C Doseděl (Slovakia) D Hrbatý	3	**6**	3

Quarterfinals
1	(United States) **D Johnson** **(Czech Republic) C Suk**	**6**	**6**
(Argentina) M García (Argentina) S Prieto	1	4
(Czechoslovakia) **M Damm** **(Czech Republic) R Štěpánek**	**7**	6	**7**
(Australia) W Arthurs (Australia) A Kratzmann	6	**7**	5
(Spain) E Nicolás (Spain) G Puentes	3	2
3	(United States) **J Palmer** **(United States) J Tarango**	**6**	**6**
(United States) **M Keil** **(Ecuador) N Lapentti**	w/o
2	(Czech Republic) J Novák (Czech Republic) D Rikl

Semifinals
1	(United States) D Johnson (Czech Republic) C Suk	4	6
(Czechoslovakia) **M Damm** **(Czech Republic) R Štěpánek**	**6**	**7**
3	(United States) J Palmer (United States) J Tarango	4	2
(United States) **M Keil** **(Ecuador) N Lapentti**	**6**	**6**

Final
(Czechoslovakia) **M Damm** **(Czech Republic) R Štěpánek**	**6**	**6**
(United States) M Keil (Ecuador) N Lapentti	0	2
