= 1999 Paegas Czech Open =

- Date: 26 April – 2 May
- Edition: 13th
- Category: World Series
- Draw: 32S / 16D
- Prize money: $475,000
- Surface: Clay / outdoor
- Location: Prague, Czech Republic
- Venue: I. Czech Lawn Tennis Club

Champions

Singles
- (Slovakia) Dominik Hrbatý

Doubles
- (Czech Republic) Martin Damm / (Czech Republic) Radek Štěpánek
- Prague Open

The 1999 Paegas Czech Open, also known as the Prague Open, was a men's tennis tournament played on outdoor clay courts in Prague, Czech Republic that was part of the World Series of the 1999 ATP Tour. It was the 13th edition of the tournament and was held from 26 April until 2 May 1999. Fifth-seeded Dominik Hrbatý won the singles title.

== Finals ==
=== Singles ===
(Slovakia) Dominik Hrbatý defeated (Czech Republic) Ctislav Doseděl, 6–2, 6–2

- It was Hrbatý's 1st singles title of the year and the 2nd of his career.

=== Doubles ===
(Czech Republic) Martin Damm / (Czech Republic) Radek Štěpánek defeated (United States) Mark Keil / (Ecuador) Nicolás Lapentti, 6–0, 6–2
