= Radovan Světlík =

Czech tennis player (born 1974)

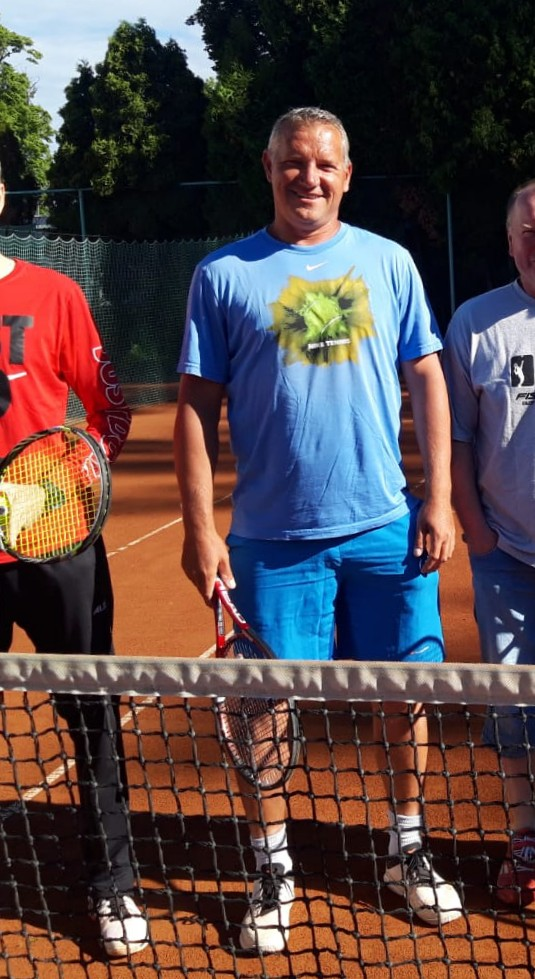
- Country (sports): Czech Republic
- Born: 12 April 1974 (age 51)
- Prize money: $55,840

Singles
- Career record: 0–1
- Highest ranking: No. 230 (29 January 1996)

Grand Slam singles results
- French Open: Q2 (1996)
- Wimbledon: Q1 (1996, 1999)
- US Open: Q1 (1999)

Doubles
- Career record: 1 (ATP Challenger)
- Highest ranking: No. 331 (12 June 2000)

Radovan Světlík (born 12 April 1974) is a Czech former professional tennis player.

Světlík, who reached a best ranking of 230 in the world, qualified for his only ATP Tour main draw at the 1999 Prague Open. He had qualifying wins over Petr Pála, Radomír Vašek and Tuomas Ketola, then fell to Australian Open semi-finalist Nicolás Lapentti in the first round.

During his career he also featured in the qualifying draws for the French Open, Wimbledon and US Open.

Most of the time he competed on the Challenger and ITF circuits. He won a Challenger tournament at Bressanone in 1999, partnering David Miketa in the doubles.

== Challenger titles ==
=== Doubles: (1) ===
Year	Tournament	Surface	Partner	Opponents	Score
1999	Bressanone, Italy	Clay	(Czech Republic) David Miketa	(Italy) Manuel Jorquera (Germany) Anthony Parun	7–5, 6–4
