= Cristiano Caratti =

Italian tennis player

- Country (sports): Italy
- Residence: Monte Carlo, Monaco
- Born: 24 May 1970 (age 55); Acqui Terme, Italy
- Height: 1.78 m (5 ft 10 in)
- Turned pro: 1989
- Plays: Right-handed (one-handed backhand)
- Prize money: $1,368,916

Singles
- Career record: 72–117
- Career titles: 0; 7 Challenger, 0 Futures
- Highest ranking: No. 26 (22 July 1991)

Grand Slam singles results
- Australian Open: QF (1991)
- French Open: 2R (1991)
- Wimbledon: 2R (1995)
- US Open: 3R (1990)

Other tournaments
- Grand Slam Cup: 1R (1991)
- Olympic Games: 1R (1992)

Doubles
- Career record: 7–29
- Career titles: 0; 1 Challenger, 0 Futures
- Highest ranking: No. 148 (16 July 1990)

Grand Slam doubles results
- Australian Open: 1R (1991)
- US Open: 1R (1990)
- Last updated on: 26 February 2023.

Cristiano Caratti (born 24 May 1970) is a former ATP Tour tennis player from Italy. He reached the quarterfinals of the 1991 Australian Open and the 1991 Miami Masters.

== Junior tennis career ==
Started playing tennis at age 9. His younger brother also plays tennis. He won the 1987 Orange Bowl doubles title (w/Koves) and reached the doubles final at the 1988 French Open Juniors (w/Goran Ivanišević), losing to Jason Stoltenberg–Todd Woodbridge. Also reached the semifinal at the Wimbledon Juniors (losing to the same duo).

== Senior tennis career ==
Caratti turned professional in 1989. His highest achievement was reaching the quarter-finals at the 1991 Australian Open, defeating eventual Wimbledon champion Richard Kraijcek before losing to Patrick McEnroe. Thanks to this result, the right-hander reached his highest singles ATP-ranking on 22 July 1991, when he became World No. 26. He then represented his native country at the 1992 Summer Olympics in Barcelona, but was defeated in the first round by then France's No.1 player Guy Forget. His last tournament win on the senior tour took place in 2000 at the Knoxville Challenger, where in the final he again defeated an up-and-coming Slam winner, Andy Roddick, who would also be ranked world No.1 three years later.

== ATP Career Finals ==
=== Singles: 1 (1 runner-up) ===
| Legend Grand Slam Tournaments (0–0) ATP World Tour Finals (0–0) ATP Masters Series (0–0) ATP Championship Series (0–0) ATP World Series (0–1) | Finals by surface Hard (0–0) Clay (0–0) Grass (0–0) Carpet (0–1) | Finals by setting Outdoors (0–0) Indoors (0–1) |

| Result | W–L | Date | Tournament | Tier | Surface | Opponent | Score |
|---|---|---|---|---|---|---|---|
| Loss | 0–1 | Feb 1991 | Milan, Italy | World Series | Carpet | (Russia) Alexander Volkov | 1–6, 5–7 |

=== Doubles: 1 (1 runner-up) ===
| Legend Grand Slam Tournaments (0–0) ATP World Tour Finals (0–0) ATP Masters Series (0–0) ATP Championship Series (0–0) ATP World Series (0–1) | Finals by surface Hard (0–0) Clay (0–1) Grass (0–0) Carpet (0–0) | Finals by setting Outdoors (0–1) Indoors (0–0) |

| Result | W–L | Date | Tournament | Tier | Surface | Partner | Opponents | Score |
|---|---|---|---|---|---|---|---|---|
| Loss | 0–1 | Jun 1990 | Genoa, Italy | World Series | Clay | (Italy) Federico Mordegan | (Spain) Tomás Carbonell (Germany) Udo Riglewski | 6–7, 6–7 |

== ATP Challenger and ITF Futures finals ==
=== Singles: 19 (7–12) ===
| Legend ATP Challenger (7–11) ITF Futures (0–1) | Finals by surface Hard (6–10) Clay (0–0) Grass (0–0) Carpet (1–2) |

| Result | W–L | Date | Tournament | Tier | Surface | Opponent | Score |
|---|---|---|---|---|---|---|---|
| Loss | 0–1 | Jul 1989 | Dublin, Ireland | Challenger | Carpet | (Sweden) Henrik Holm | 0–6, 6–4, 3–6 |
| Win | 1–1 | Aug 1990 | Winnetka, United States | Challenger | Hard | (United States) Chris Garner | 7–6, 6–1 |
| Win | 2–1 | Dec 1990 | Bossonnens, Switzerland | Challenger | Hard | (Netherlands) Michiel Schapers | 6–4, 3–6, 7–6 |
| Win | 3–1 | Mar 1991 | Indian Wells, United States | Challenger | Hard | (United States) Jimmy Arias | 6–7, 6–4, 6–2 |
| Win | 4–1 | Feb 1993 | Wolfsburg, Germany | Challenger | Carpet | (Germany) Lars Koslowski | 6–7, 6–1, 6–2 |
| Loss | 4–2 | Jul 1993 | Aptos, United States | Challenger | Hard | (Australia) Patrick Rafter | 2–6, 3–6 |
| Win | 5–2 | Jul 1993 | Montebello, Canada | Challenger | Hard | (United States) Steve Bryan | 4–6, 7–5, 6–2 |
| Loss | 5–3 | Jan 1994 | Heilbronn, Germany | Challenger | Carpet | (Germany) Markus Zoecke | 3–6, 4–6 |
| Loss | 5–4 | Jul 1994 | Winnetka, United States | Challenger | Hard | (United States) Vince Spadea | 1–6, 6–4, 5–7 |
| Loss | 5–5 | Dec 1994 | Andorra la Vella, Andorra | Challenger | Hard | (Kenya) Paul Wekesa | 4–6, 5–7 |
| Loss | 5–6 | Jul 1997 | Granby, Canada | Challenger | Hard | (Zimbabwe) Wayne Black | 1–6, 2–6 |
| Win | 6–6 | Sep 1997 | Azores, Portugal | Challenger | Hard | (Spain) Óscar Burrieza | 3–6, 6–3, 6–4 |
| Loss | 6–7 | Oct 1998 | Dallas, United States | Challenger | Hard | (Canada) Daniel Nestor | 1–6, 2–6 |
| Loss | 6–8 | Jan 1999 | USA F2, Miami | Futures | Hard | (Belgium) Kris Goossens | 4–6, 6–7 |
| Loss | 6–9 | Oct 1999 | San Antonio, United States | Challenger | Hard | (The Bahamas) Mark Knowles | 4–6, 6–3, 1–6 |
| Loss | 6–10 | Nov 2000 | Las Vegas, United States | Challenger | Hard | (South Africa) Neville Godwin | 3–6, 3–6 |
| Win | 7–10 | Nov 2000 | Knoxville, United States | Challenger | Hard | (United States) Andy Roddick | 3–6, 7–6^{(7–1)}, 6–4 |
| Loss | 7–11 | Nov 2001 | Prague, Czech Republic | Challenger | Hard | (Czech Republic) Ota Fukárek | 3–6, 3–6 |
| Loss | 7–12 | Aug 2002 | Córdoba, Spain | Challenger | Hard | (France) Jean-François Bachelot | 5–7, 6–3, 4–6 |

=== Doubles: 6 (1–5) ===
| Legend ATP Challenger (1–4) ITF Futures (0–1) | Finals by surface Hard (0–3) Clay (0–1) Grass (0–0) Carpet (1–1) |

| Result | W–L | Date | Tournament | Tier | Surface | Partner | Opponents | Score |
|---|---|---|---|---|---|---|---|---|
| Loss | 0–1 | Jul 1989 | Furth, Germany | Challenger | Clay | (Italy) Federico Mordegan | (Georgia (country)) Vladimer Gabrichidze (Ukraine) Dimitri Poliakov | 4–6, 7–6, 4–6 |
| Loss | 0–2 | Mar 1990 | Jerusalem, Israel | Challenger | Hard | (Italy) Cristian Brandi | (Sweden) Henrik Holm (Sweden) Peter Nyborg | 1–6, 6–2, 3–6 |
| Win | 1–2 | Mar 1993 | Bergamo, Italy | Challenger | Carpet | (Italy) Cristian Brandi | (Netherlands) Sander Groen (Germany) Arne Thoms | 4–6, 6–4, 6–1 |
| Loss | 1–3 | Jul 1993 | Aptos, United States | Challenger | Hard | (Australia) Grant Doyle | (Israel) Gilad Bloom (Germany) Christian Saceanu | 5–7, 3–6 |
| Loss | 1–4 | Jan 1994 | Heilbronn, Germany | Challenger | Carpet | (Italy) Omar Camporese | (Latvia) Ģirts Dzelde (Germany) Mathias Huning | 4–6, 2–6 |
| Loss | 1–5 | Jan 1999 | USA F2, Miami | Futures | Hard | (Italy) Manuel Jorquera | (United States) Scott Humphries (United States) Jim Thomas | 4–6, 3–6 |

== Junior Grand Slam finals ==
=== Doubles: 1 (1 runner-up) ===
| Result | Year | Tournament | Surface | Partnet | Opponents | Score |
|---|---|---|---|---|---|---|
| Loss | 1988 | French Open | Clay | (Croatia) Goran Ivanišević | (Australia) Todd Woodbridge (Australia) Jason Stoltenberg | 6–7, 5–7 |

== Performance timelines ==
Key
| W | F | SF | QF | #R | RR | Q# | DNQ | A | NH |

(W) winner; (F) finalist; (SF) semifinalist; (QF) quarterfinalist; (#R) rounds 4, 3, 2, 1; (RR) round-robin stage; (Q#) qualification round; (DNQ) did not qualify; (A) absent; (NH) not held; (SR) strike rate (events won / competed); (W–L) win–loss record.

=== Singles ===
| Tournament | 1990 | 1991 | 1992 | 1993 | 1994 | 1995 | 1996 | 1997 | 1998 | 1999 | 2000 | 2001 | 2002 | 2003 | SR | W–L | Win % |
|---|---|---|---|---|---|---|---|---|---|---|---|---|---|---|---|---|---|
Grand Slam tournaments
| Australian Open | Q2 | QF | 2R | 1R | 1R | 2R | Q2 | Q2 | Q1 | A | Q2 | Q2 | A | A | 0 / 5 | 6–5 | 55% |
| French Open | A | 2R | A | A | 1R | 1R | Q1 | 1R | Q3 | Q2 | Q2 | Q1 | Q1 | Q1 | 0 / 4 | 1–4 | 20% |
| Wimbledon | A | 1R | A | A | A | 2R | 1R | A | A | 1R | Q2 | Q3 | 1R | Q2 | 0 / 5 | 1–5 | 17% |
| US Open | 3R | 2R | 1R | 1R | Q1 | 1R | Q1 | 1R | Q1 | 2R | Q2 | 1R | Q1 | Q1 | 0 / 8 | 4–8 | 33% |
| Win–loss | 2–1 | 6–4 | 1–2 | 0–2 | 0–2 | 2–4 | 0–1 | 0–2 | 0–0 | 1–2 | 0–0 | 0–1 | 0–1 | 0–0 | 0 / 22 | 12–22 | 35% |
National Representation
| Summer Olympics | NH | | 1R | Not Held | | | A | Not Held | | | A | Not Held | | | 0 / 1 | 0–1 | 0% |
Year-End Championships
| Grand Slam Cup | DNQ | 1R | Did not qualify | | | | | | | | | | | | 0 / 1 | 0–1 | 0% |
ATP Masters Series
| Indian Wells | A | 1R | 1R | Q1 | A | A | Q1 | A | A | A | A | A | A | A | 0 / 2 | 0–2 | 0% |
| Miami | A | QF | 1R | Q3 | A | A | 1R | A | A | A | A | A | A | A | 0 / 3 | 3–3 | 50% |
| Monte Carlo | A | 2R | 1R | Q1 | Q1 | Q1 | A | Q1 | A | Q1 | A | A | A | A | 0 / 2 | 1–2 | 33% |
| Hamburg | A | 1R | 1R | A | A | A | A | Q2 | A | Q1 | A | A | A | A | 0 / 2 | 4–2 | 67% |
| Rome | A | 3R | 1R | 1R | Q1 | A | 1R | Q1 | A | A | Q1 | A | A | A | 0 / 4 | 2–4 | 33% |
| Canada | A | 1R | 1R | A | A | 1R | A | 2R | A | A | A | Q1 | A | A | 0 / 4 | 1–4 | 20% |
| Cincinnati | A | 1R | A | Q1 | 2R | Q3 | 3R | Q1 | A | Q1 | A | A | A | A | 0 / 3 | 3–3 | 50% |
| Paris | A | A | A | A | A | A | 1R | Q1 | A | A | A | A | A | A | 0 / 1 | 0–1 | 0% |
| Win–loss | 0–0 | 8–7 | 2–6 | 0–1 | 1–1 | 0–1 | 2–4 | 1–1 | 0–0 | 0–0 | 0–0 | 0–0 | 0–0 | 0–0 | 0 / 21 | 14–21 | 40% |
