= 2001 Wimbledon Championships – Women's singles =

Women's singles
- 2001 Wimbledon Championships

Final
- Champion: (United States) Venus Williams
- Runner-up: (Belgium) Justine Henin
- Score: 6–1, 3–6, 6–0
- Date: 8 July 2001 (Note: Originally scheduled for 7 July, but was postponed by one day due to unfinished matches because of rain.)

Details
- Draw: 128 (12Q / 8WC)
- Seeds: 32

Events
Singles	men	women		boys	girls
Doubles	men	women	mixed	boys	girls
WC Singles	men	women	quad
WC Doubles	men	women	quad
Legends	men	women	seniors
- Wimbledon Championships

Defending champion Venus Williams defeated Justine Henin in the final, 6–1, 3–6, 6–0 to win the ladies' singles tennis title at the 2001 Wimbledon Championships. It was her second Wimbledon singles title and third major singles title overall.

This tournament saw world No. 1 Martina Hingis lose in the opening round to world No. 83 Virginia Ruano Pascual.

== Seeds ==
1. (Switzerland) Martina Hingis (first round)
2. (United States) Venus Williams (champion)
3. (United States) Lindsay Davenport (semifinals)
4. (United States) Jennifer Capriati (semifinals)
5. (United States) Serena Williams (quarterfinals)
6. (France) Amélie Mauresmo (third round)
7. (Belgium) Kim Clijsters (quarterfinals)
8. (Belgium) Justine Henin (final)
9. (France) Nathalie Tauziat (quarterfinals)
10. (Russia) Elena Dementieva (third round)
11. (South Africa) Amanda Coetzer (third round)
12. (Bulgaria) Magdalena Maleeva (fourth round)
13. (Spain) Arantxa Sánchez Vicario (second round)
14. (Federal Republic of Yugoslavia) Jelena Dokić (fourth round)
15. (France) Sandrine Testud (fourth round)
16. (Italy) Silvia Farina Elia (third round)

17. (United States) Meghann Shaughnessy (fourth round)
18. (Germany) Anke Huber (fourth round)
19. (Spain) Conchita Martínez (quarterfinals)
20. (United States) Amy Frazier (third round)
21. (Austria) Barbara Schett (third round)
22. (Argentina) Paola Suárez (first round)
23. (Spain) Magüi Serna (first round)
24. (Slovakia) Henrieta Nagyová (first round)
25. (United States) Chanda Rubin (first round)
26. (Luxembourg) Anne Kremer (first round)
27. (Spain) Ángeles Montolio (third round)
28. (United States) Lisa Raymond (third round)
29. (Russia) Elena Likhovtseva (third round)
30. (Switzerland) Patty Schnyder (third round)
31. (Thailand) Tamarine Tanasugarn (fourth round)
32. (Russia) Tatiana Panova (third round)

Click on the seed number of a player to go to their draw section.

== Draw ==
Key

- Q = Qualifier
- WC = Wild card
- LL = Lucky loser
- Alt = Alternate
- ITF = ITF entry
- PR = Protected ranking
- SR = Special ranking
- SE = Special exempt
- JE = Junior exempt
- JR = Junior Accelerator Programme entrant
- CO = College Accelerator Programme entrant
- NG = Next Gen Accelerator Program entrant
- w/o = Walkover
- r = Retired
- d = Defaulted

=== Finals ===
Quarterfinals
19	(Spain) Conchita Martínez	1	0
8	(Belgium) Justine Henin	6	6
4	(United States) Jennifer Capriati	6^{4}	7	6
5	(United States) Serena Williams	7^{7}	5	3
7	(Belgium) Kim Clijsters	1	2
3	(United States) Lindsay Davenport	6	6
9	(France) Nathalie Tauziat	5	1
2	(United States) Venus Williams	7	6

Semifinals
8	(Belgium) Justine Henin	2	6	6
4	(United States) Jennifer Capriati	6	4	2
3	(United States) Lindsay Davenport	2	7^{7}	1
2	(United States) Venus Williams	6	6^{1}	6

Final
8	(Belgium) Justine Henin	1	6	0
2	(United States) Venus Williams	6	3	6

=== Top half ===
==== Section 1 ====
First round
1	(Switzerland) M Hingis	4	2
(Spain) V Ruano Pascual	6	6
(Russia) L Krasnoroutskaya	3	6	6
(France) A-G Sidot	6	4	2
(Tunisia) S Sfar	6^{1}	6	6
(Sweden) Å Svensson	7^{7}	3	4
Q	(Austria) B Schwartz	6^{1}	6	7
25	(United States) C Rubin	7^{7}	4	5
19	(Spain) C Martínez	6	3	6
(Czech Republic) D Bedáňová	2	6	3
(Belarus) T Poutchek	3	7	1
(United States) S Cacic	6	5	6
(United States) L Osterloh	6	7
(United States) M Tu	4	5
(Argentina) ME Salerni	3	3
13	(Spain) A Sánchez Vicario	6	6

Second round
(Spain) V Ruano Pascual	3	6^{3}
(Russia) L Krasnoroutskaya	6	7^{7}
(Tunisia) S Sfar	4	4
Q	(Austria) B Schwartz	6	6
19	(Spain) C Martínez	7	6
(United States) S Cacic	5	4
(United States) L Osterloh	7^{7}	7
13	(Spain) A Sánchez Vicario	6^{4}	5

Third round
(Russia) L Krasnoroutskaya	6	6
Q	(Austria) B Schwartz	3	4
19	(Spain) C Martínez	6	6
(United States) L Osterloh	2	3

Fourth round
(Russia) L Krasnoroutskaya	3	4
19	(Spain) C Martínez	6	6

==== Section 2 ====
First round
10	(Russia) E Dementieva	7	6^{10}	6
(United States) A Bradshaw	5	7^{12}	3
(Germany) B Lamade	6	6^{1}	6
(Czech Republic) D Chládková	1	7^{7}	3
(Germany) M Weingärtner	3	7^{7}	6
WC	(United Kingdom) J Pullin	6	6^{5}	4
(Australia) E Dominikovic	3	2
18	(Germany) A Huber	6	6
28	(United States) L Raymond	6	6
WC	(United Kingdom) L Latimer	3	0
(Netherlands) Y Basting	4	4
Q	(United Kingdom) K Cross	6	6
Q	(Netherlands) K Boogert	6	6
(Canada) S Jeyaseelan	3	2
(France) S Pitkowski	1	0
8	(Belgium) J Henin	6	6

Second round
10	(Russia) E Dementieva	4	6	6
(Germany) B Lamade	6	3	2
(Germany) M Weingärtner	5	1
18	(Germany) A Huber	7	6
28	(United States) L Raymond	6	6
Q	(United Kingdom) K Cross	0	1
Q	(Netherlands) K Boogert	7	5	2
8	(Belgium) J Henin	5	7	6

Third round
10	(Russia) E Dementieva	0	2
18	(Germany) A Huber	6	6
28	(United States) L Raymond	4	6^{6}
8	(Belgium) J Henin	6	7^{8}

Fourth round
18	(Germany) A Huber	6	2	2
8	(Belgium) J Henin	4	6	6

==== Section 3 ====
First round
4	(United States) J Capriati	6	6
(Venezuela) M Vento	3	2
(United States) M Irvin	6	1	2
(Italy) F Schiavone	2	6	6
(Spain) G León García	6	1	4
(Slovenia) T Pisnik	1	6	6
(Romania) R Dragomir Ilie	3	3
32	(Russia) T Panova	6	6
22	(Argentina) P Suárez	6^{5}	2
(Russia) A Myskina	7^{7}	6
(Spain) N Llagostera	5	6	2
(Japan) A Sugiyama	7	2	6
(Slovakia) K Habšudová	6	6
Q	(Germany) M Schnitzer	1	4
(Australia) R McQuillan	2	2
15	(France) S Testud	6	6

Second round
4	(United States) J Capriati	6	6
(Italy) F Schiavone	3	1
(Slovenia) T Pisnik	6^{3}	6	2
32	(Russia) T Panova	7^{7}	2	6
(Russia) A Myskina	6	4	3
(Japan) A Sugiyama	2	6	6
(Slovakia) K Habšudová	0	1
15	(France) S Testud	6	6

Third round
4	(United States) J Capriati	6	6
32	(Russia) T Panova	4	4
(Japan) A Sugiyama	7^{7}	2	2
15	(France) S Testud	6^{5}	6	6

Fourth round
4	(United States) J Capriati	6	6
15	(France) S Testud	1	2

==== Section 4 ====
First round
12	(Bulgaria) M Maleeva	6	6
Q	(Argentina) C Fernández	0	2
(Czech Republic) S Kleinová	6	2	1
(Russia) E Bovina	3	6	6
WC	(United Kingdom) A Keothavong	6	4	3
LL	(Chinese Taipei) J Lee	2	6	6
(Switzerland) M Vavrinec	1	5
20	(United States) A Frazier	6	7
26	(Luxembourg) A Kremer	4	2
(United States) K Brandi	6	6
(Switzerland) E Gagliardi	6	6
WC	(United Kingdom) L Ahl	4	1
(Germany) A Glass	3	4
(Germany) B Rittner	6	6
(Hungary) R Kuti-Kis	1	0
5	(United States) S Williams	6	6

Second round
12	(Bulgaria) M Maleeva	7	7
(Russia) E Bovina	5	5
LL	(Chinese Taipei) J Lee	4	2
20	(United States) A Frazier	6	6
(United States) K Brandi	1	2
(Switzerland) E Gagliardi	6	6
(Germany) B Rittner	4	0
5	(United States) S Williams	6	6

Third round
12	(Bulgaria) M Maleeva	6	6
20	(United States) A Frazier	3	2
(Switzerland) E Gagliardi	1	2
5	(United States) S Williams	6	6

Fourth round
12	(Bulgaria) M Maleeva	2	1
5	(United States) S Williams	6	6

=== Bottom half ===
==== Section 5 ====
First round
7	(Belgium) K Clijsters	6	6
(Italy) G Casoni	0	2
(New Zealand) P Nola	3	2
Q	(Canada) M Drake	6	6
(Italy) R Grande	4	4
Q	(Germany) A Barna	6	6
(France) V Razzano	6	6^{5}	4
27	(Spain) Á Montolio	4	7^{7}	6
17	(United States) M Shaughnessy	7^{7}	6
(Croatia) I Majoli	6^{4}	3
(South Africa) J Kruger	6	3	6
(Spain) M Marrero	4	6	8
WC	(United Kingdom) H Collin	4	2
(France) É Loit	6	6
Q	(France) S Foretz	4	4
11	(South Africa) A Coetzer	6	6

Second round
7	(Belgium) K Clijsters	6	6
Q	(Canada) M Drake	3	1
Q	(Germany) A Barna	3	4
27	(Spain) Á Montolio	6	6
17	(United States) M Shaughnessy	6	7
(Spain) M Marrero	0	5
(France) É Loit	2	3
11	(South Africa) A Coetzer	6	6

Third round
7	(Belgium) K Clijsters	7	6
27	(Spain) Á Montolio	5	2
17	(United States) M Shaughnessy	7^{7}	2	6
11	(South Africa) A Coetzer	6^{4}	6	1

Fourth round
7	(Belgium) K Clijsters	7^{7}	7^{7}
17	(United States) M Shaughnessy	6^{2}	6^{5}

==== Section 6 ====
First round
14	(Federal Republic of Yugoslavia) J Dokić	7	6
(Paraguay) R de los Ríos	5	1
(Argentina) M Díaz Oliva	6	3	2
(United States) J Hopkins	3	6	6
WC	(United Kingdom) E Baltacha	1	5
(France) N Dechy	6	7
Q	(Slovenia) M Matevžič	6	2	6
21	(Austria) B Schett	4	6	8
30	(Switzerland) P Schnyder	6	6
(Canada) J Nejedly	4	4
(Germany) J Kandarr	6	7^{7}
(Spain) A Medina Garrigues	3	6^{4}
(Australia) A Molik	6	7^{7}
(Colombia) C Castaño	4	6^{1}
(Slovakia) M Suchá	3	3
3	(United States) L Davenport	6	6

Second round
14	(Federal Republic of Yugoslavia) J Dokić	6	6
(United States) J Hopkins	2	4
(France) N Dechy	6^{5}	3
21	(Austria) B Schett	7^{7}	6
30	(Switzerland) P Schnyder	6	6
(Germany) J Kandarr	2	2
(Australia) A Molik	4	2
3	(United States) L Davenport	6	6

Third round
14	(Federal Republic of Yugoslavia) J Dokić	6	7
21	(Austria) B Schett	3	5
30	(Switzerland) P Schnyder	2	3
3	(United States) L Davenport	6	6

Fourth round
14	(Federal Republic of Yugoslavia) J Dokić	5	4
3	(United States) L Davenport	7	6

==== Section 7 ====
First round
6	(France) A Mauresmo	7^{8}	4	6
(Australia) N Pratt	6^{6}	6	4
Q	(Greece) E Daniilidou	6	3	6
(Bulgaria) L Bacheva	0	6	3
(Slovakia) Ľ Cervanová	6	5	6
(United States) D Buth	2	7	3
(Zimbabwe) C Black	5	7^{7}	3
31	(Thailand) T Tanasugarn	7	6^{2}	6
24	(Slovakia) H Nagyová	6^{4}	1
Q	(Italy) A Serra Zanetti	7^{7}	6
WC	(United Kingdom) L Woodroffe	6^{5}	4
(Uzbekistan) I Tulyaganova	7^{7}	6
(Slovakia) J Husárová	6	2	9
(Hungary) P Mandula	0	6	11
Q	(Indonesia) W Prakusya	4	2
9	(France) N Tauziat	6	6

Second round
6	(France) A Mauresmo	6	6
Q	(Greece) E Daniilidou	3	2
(Slovakia) Ľ Cervanová	2	6	1
31	(Thailand) T Tanasugarn	6	2	6
Q	(Italy) A Serra Zanetti	3	7^{8}	2
(Uzbekistan) I Tulyaganova	6	6^{6}	6
(Hungary) P Mandula	0	1
9	(France) N Tauziat	6	6

Third round
6	(France) A Mauresmo	4	4
31	(Thailand) T Tanasugarn	6	6
(Uzbekistan) I Tulyaganova	0	3
9	(France) N Tauziat	6	6

Fourth round
31	(Thailand) T Tanasugarn	3	2
9	(France) N Tauziat	6	6

==== Section 8 ====
First round
16	(Italy) S Farina Elia	6	6
(Czech Republic) A Gerši	1	2
(Italy) T Garbin	6	4	4
WC	(United States) A Stevenson	2	6	6
(Austria) S Plischke	6	6
(Spain) MJ Martínez Sánchez	3	4
(Russia) N Petrova	6	2	6
23	(Spain) M Serna	3	6	2
29	(Russia) E Likhovtseva	6	6
(United States) J Craybas	3	4
(Spain) C Torrens Valero	7^{7}	6
(Israel) A Smashnova	6^{3}	3
(Netherlands) M Oremans	6^{2}	5
(Slovakia) D Hantuchová	7^{7}	7
(Japan) S Asagoe	2	3
2	(United States) V Williams	6	6

Second round
16	(Italy) S Farina Elia	6	6
WC	(United States) A Stevenson	3	2
(Austria) S Plischke	1	0
(Russia) N Petrova	6	6
29	(Russia) E Likhovtseva	6	6
(Spain) C Torrens Valero	1	1
(Slovakia) D Hantuchová	3	2
2	(United States) V Williams	6	6

Third round
16	(Italy) S Farina Elia	3	3
(Russia) N Petrova	6	6
29	(Russia) E Likhovtseva	2	2
2	(United States) V Williams	6	6

Fourth round
(Russia) N Petrova	2	0
2	(United States) V Williams	6	6

== Notes ==
Preceded by 2001 French Open – Women's singles	Grand Slam women's singles	Succeeded by 2001 US Open – Women's singles
