= 2001 Wimbledon Championships – Men's singles =

Men's singles
- 2001 Wimbledon Championships

Final
- Champion: (Croatia) Goran Ivanišević
- Runner-up: (Australia) Patrick Rafter
- Score: 6–3, 3–6, 6–3, 2–6, 9–7
- Date: 9 July 2001 (Note: Originally scheduled for 8 July, but was postponed due to the one of semifinal matches took three days due to rain.)

Details
- Draw: 128 (16 Q / 8 WC )
- Seeds: 32

Events
Singles	men	women		boys	girls
Doubles	men	women	mixed	boys	girls
WC Singles	men	women	quad
WC Doubles	men	women	quad
Legends	men	women	seniors
- Wimbledon Championships

Goran Ivanišević defeated Patrick Rafter in the final, 6–3, 3–6, 6–3, 2–6, 9–7 to win the gentlemen's singles tennis title at the 2001 Wimbledon Championships. It was his only major title, following three runner-up finishes (all at Wimbledon in 1992, 1994, and 1998). Ivanišević was the first unseeded player to win the title since Boris Becker in 1985, and the first and only wild card to win a men's singles major. His ranking improved by 109 places following the win, from world No. 125 to world No. 16. The final was held on the third Monday of the event in front of a boisterous crowd, after Ivanišević's semifinal against Tim Henman took three days to complete due to rain.

Pete Sampras was the four-time defending champion, but lost in the fourth round to Roger Federer. The Sampras–Federer match was the pair's only professional meeting, with Federer being 19 years old and the soon-to-be 30 year old Sampras retiring from the sport the following year. This was the first major in which Federer was seeded. Sampras was attempting to equal Björn Borg's record of five consecutive Wimbledon titles (which Federer would himself achieve in 2007) and to win a record-breaking eighth men's singles Wimbledon title (which Federer would achieve in 2017).

This was the year when Wimbledon expanded from 16 to 32 seeds.

== Seeds ==
1. (United States) Pete Sampras (fourth round)
2. (United States) Andre Agassi (semifinals)
3. (Australia) Patrick Rafter (final)
4. (Russia) Marat Safin (quarterfinals)
5. (Australia) Lleyton Hewitt (fourth round)
6. (United Kingdom) Tim Henman (semifinals)
7. (Russia) Yevgeny Kafelnikov (third round)
8. (Spain) Juan Carlos Ferrero (third round)
9. (France) Sébastien Grosjean (third round)
10. (Sweden) Thomas Enqvist (quarterfinals)
11. (Sweden) Thomas Johansson (second round)
12. (United States) Jan-Michael Gambill (first round)
13. (France) Arnaud Clément (fourth round)
14. (South Africa) Wayne Ferreira (first round)
15. (Switzerland) Roger Federer (quarterfinals)
16. (Belarus) Vladimir Voltchkov (first round)
17. (Germany) Tommy Haas (first round)

18. (Sweden) Magnus Norman (withdrew)
19. (Germany) Nicolas Kiefer (fourth round)
20. (France) Fabrice Santoro (third round)
21. (Spain) Carlos Moyá (second round)
22. (Slovakia) Dominik Hrbatý (first round)
23. (United States) Todd Martin (fourth round)
24. (France) Nicolas Escudé (quarterfinals)
25. (Spain) Albert Portas (first round)
26. (Netherlands) Sjeng Schalken (third round)
27. (Morocco) Hicham Arazi (third round)
28. (Argentina) Franco Squillari (first round)
29. (Argentina) Guillermo Coria (first round)
30. (Ecuador) Nicolás Lapentti (withdrew)
31. (Spain) Alberto Martín (first round)
32. (Argentina) Gastón Gaudio (first round)
33. (Sweden) Jonas Björkman (third round)
34. (Israel) Harel Levy (first round)

Click on the seed number of a player to go to their draw section.

Magnus Norman and Nicolás Lapentti withdrew due to injury. They were replaced in the draw by the highest-ranked non-seeded players Jonas Björkman and Harel Levy, who became the #33 and #34 seeds respectively.

== Draw ==
Key

- Q = Qualifier
- WC = Wild card
- LL = Lucky loser
- Alt = Alternate
- ITF = ITF entry
- PR = Protected ranking
- SR = Special ranking
- SE = Special exempt
- JE = Junior exempt
- JR = Junior Accelerator Programme entrant
- CO = College Accelerator Programme entrant
- NG = Next Gen Accelerator Program entrant
- w/o = Walkover
- r = Retired
- d = Defaulted

=== Finals ===
Quarterfinals
15	(Switzerland) Roger Federer	5	6^{6}	6	6^{6}
6	(United Kingdom) Tim Henman	7	7^{8}	2	7^{8}
4	(Russia) Marat Safin	6^{2}	5	6	6^{3}
WC	(Croatia) Goran Ivanišević	7^{7}	7	3	7^{7}
10	(Sweden) Thomas Enqvist	1	3	6^{5}
3	(Australia) Patrick Rafter	6	6	7^{7}
24	(France) Nicolas Escudé	7^{7}	3	4	2
2	(United States) Andre Agassi	6^{3}	6	6	6

Semifinals
6	(United Kingdom) Tim Henman	5	7^{8}	6	6^{5}	3
WC	(Croatia) Goran Ivanišević	7	6^{6}	0	7^{7}	6
3	(Australia) Patrick Rafter	2	6	3	6	8
2	(United States) Andre Agassi	6	3	6	2	6

Final
WC	(Croatia) Goran Ivanišević	6	3	6	2	9
3	(Australia) Patrick Rafter	3	6	3	6	7

=== Top half ===
==== Section 1 ====
First round
1	(United States) P Sampras	6	7^{7}	6
(Spain) F Clavet	4	6^{5}	4
WC	(United Kingdom) B Cowan	6	6	7^{7}
WC	(United Kingdom) M Hilton	3	2	6^{2}
(Armenia) S Sargsian	6	6	6
(Argentina) J Acasuso	3	1	4
(Spain) T Robredo	7^{7}	6
34	(Israel) H Levy	6^{5}	5^{r}
33	(Sweden) J Björkman	6	6	6
(Germany) L Burgsmüller	4	3	4
(United States) M Chang	6	6	6^{4}	4	6
(Czech Republic) J Vaněk	2	2	7^{7}	6	2
(Belgium) X Malisse	6	6	6
(Spain) J Díaz	2	3	3
(Belgium) C Rochus	2	3	2
15	(Switzerland) R Federer	6	6	6

Second round
1	(United States) P Sampras	6	6	6^{5}	4	6
WC	(United Kingdom) B Cowan	3	2	7^{7}	6	3
(Armenia) S Sargsian	6	6	3	6
(Spain) T Robredo	2	4	6	1
33	(Sweden) J Björkman	7^{7}	7^{7}	6
(United States) M Chang	6^{4}	6^{1}	3
(Belgium) X Malisse	3	5	6	6	3
15	(Switzerland) R Federer	6	7	3	4	6

Third round
1	(United States) P Sampras	6	6	7
(Armenia) S Sargsian	4	4	5
33	(Sweden) J Björkman	6^{4}	3	6^{2}
15	(Switzerland) R Federer	7^{7}	6	7^{7}

Fourth round
1	(United States) P Sampras	6^{7}	7	4	7^{7}	5
15	(Switzerland) R Federer	7^{9}	5	6	6^{2}	7

==== Section 2 ====
First round
12	(United States) J-M Gambill	4	6	7^{7}	3	2
(United States) C Woodruff	6	3	6^{4}	6	6
PR	(Sweden) M Larsson	6	3	6	1	6
(Switzerland) M Rosset	4	6	3	6	2
(Czech Republic) J Novák	6	6	6
(Spain) F Vicente	1	4	3
LL	(Thailand) P Srichaphan	3	4	7^{7}	3
23	(United States) T Martin	6	6	6^{4}	6
26	(Netherlands) S Schalken	6	3	6	6^{2}	7
(Austria) S Koubek	4	6	4	7^{7}	5
(Czech Republic) B Ulihrach	3	4	1
Q	(United States) B Bryan	6	6	6
WC	(United Kingdom) M Lee	6	6	6
(Italy) G Pozzi	4	3	1
Q	(Russia) A Derepasko	1	1	1
6	(United Kingdom) T Henman	6	6	6

Second round
(United States) C Woodruff	4	4	2
PR	(Sweden) M Larsson	6	6	6
(Czech Republic) J Novák	7^{7}	6	4	4	4
23	(United States) T Martin	6^{3}	2	6	6	6
26	(Netherlands) S Schalken	6	3	6	6
Q	(United States) B Bryan	4	6	3	4
WC	(United Kingdom) M Lee	2	3	4
6	(United Kingdom) T Henman	6	6	6

Third round
PR	(Sweden) M Larsson	6	0	3	5
23	(United States) T Martin	4	6	6	7
26	(Netherlands) S Schalken	7	3	4	2
6	(United Kingdom) T Henman	5	6	6	6

Fourth round
23	(United States) T Martin	7^{7}	6^{5}	6	3	2
6	(United Kingdom) T Henman	6^{3}	7^{7}	4	6	6

==== Section 3 ====
First round
4	(Russia) M Safin	6	7	5	6
Q	(Austria) J Knowle	2	5	7	3
(Spain) G Blanco	2	3	2
Q	(Canada) D Nestor	6	6	6
(Germany) D Prinosil	6^{5}	6	6	6
(South Korea) H-t Lee	7^{7}	2	4	4
(Italy) D Sanguinetti	6	3	6	6^{5}	7
25	(Spain) A Portas	3	6	3	7^{7}	5
22	(Slovakia) D Hrbatý	2	7	4	2
(Netherlands) R Sluiter	6	5	6	6
Q	(Australia) S Draper	7	3	6	5	3
Q	(Australia) T Woodbridge	5	6	3	7	6
(Spain) G Puentes	6	7^{7}	6
(Argentina) M Puerta	3	6^{2}	4
(Germany) J Knippschild	6^{5}	7	1	3
13	(France) A Clément	7^{7}	5	6	6

Second round
4	(Russia) M Safin	7^{7}	3	1
Q	(Canada) D Nestor	6^{4}	6	2^{r}
(Germany) D Prinosil	6	4	6	4	6
(Italy) D Sanguinetti	3	6	4	6	0
(Netherlands) R Sluiter	6	7^{7}	2	6
Q	(Australia) T Woodbridge	4	6^{3}	6	3
(Spain) G Puentes	3	3	4
13	(France) A Clément	6	6	6

Third round
4	(Russia) M Safin	7^{7}	6	5	1	6
(Germany) D Prinosil	6^{1}	3	7	6	3
(Netherlands) R Sluiter	7^{7}	6^{7}	4	4
13	(France) A Clément	6^{4}	7^{9}	6	6

Fourth round
4	(Russia) M Safin	6	6	6
13	(France) A Clément	0	3	2

==== Section 4 ====
First round
11	(Sweden) T Johansson	6	4	6^{5}	7^{7}	6
(Australia) A Ilie	4	6	7^{7}	6^{5}	2
(United States) A Roddick	6	6	7^{7}
Q	(Switzerland) I Heuberger	4	4	6^{0}
Q	(Sweden) F Jonsson	4	4	4
WC	(Croatia) G Ivanišević	6	6	6
Q	(South Africa) N Godwin	6	7^{7}	3	4	4
21	(Spain) C Moyá	2	6^{4}	6	6	6
31	(Spain) A Martín	1	1	0
(Zimbabwe) B Black	6	6	6
(Romania) A Pavel	6^{2}	7^{7}	6^{1}	2
(United Kingdom) G Rusedski	7^{7}	6^{5}	7^{7}	6
(Australia) J Stoltenberg	6	6	3	6
(France) J Boutter	3	4	6	2
Q	(United Kingdom) L Milligan	0	2	2
8	(Spain) JC Ferrero	6	6	6

Second round
11	(Sweden) T Johansson	6^{1}	1	6	6^{3}
(United States) A Roddick	7^{7}	6	4	7^{7}
WC	(Croatia) G Ivanišević	6^{6}	6	6	6
21	(Spain) C Moyá	7^{8}	3	4	4
(Zimbabwe) B Black	1	3	4
(United Kingdom) G Rusedski	6	6	6
(Australia) J Stoltenberg	6^{4}	6	3	7^{7}	3
8	(Spain) JC Ferrero	7^{7}	4	6	6^{3}	6

Third round
(United States) A Roddick	6^{5}	5	6	3
WC	(Croatia) G Ivanišević	7^{7}	7	3	6
(United Kingdom) G Rusedski	6	6	6
8	(Spain) JC Ferrero	1	4	4

Fourth round
WC	(Croatia) G Ivanišević	7^{7}	6	6
(United Kingdom) G Rusedski	6^{5}	4	4

=== Bottom half ===
==== Section 5 ====
First round
7	(Russia) Y Kafelnikov	6	6	6
Q	(South Korea) Y-i Yoon	4	2	4
LL	(Brazil) A Sá	6^{3}	7^{7}	4	6	6
WC	(United Kingdom) A Parmar	7^{7}	6^{5}	6	4	8
(Spain) J Balcells	5	6^{4}	6^{8}
PR	(Denmark) K Carlsen	7	7^{7}	7^{10}
(Argentina) G Cañas	1	6	3	6	7
32	(Argentina) G Gaudio	6	1	6	2	5
17	(Germany) T Haas	4	7	1	0^{r}
LL	(Zimbabwe) W Black	6	5	6	3
(Spain) F Mantilla	6	6	6^{5}	3	2
Q	(France) M Llodra	4	2	7^{7}	6	1^{r}
(Austria) M Hipfl	6	6	4	4	3
Q	(France) S Huet	3	3	6	6	6
(Czech Republic) M Damm	1	3	5
10	(Sweden) T Enqvist	6	6	7

Second round
7	(Russia) Y Kafelnikov	6^{5}	6	6	6
WC	(United Kingdom) A Parmar	7^{7}	3	3	1
PR	(Denmark) K Carlsen	5	6	7^{7}	6^{4}	4
(Argentina) G Cañas	7	4	6^{1}	7^{7}	6
LL	(Zimbabwe) W Black	6	6	7^{7}
(Spain) F Mantilla	1	2	6^{5}
Q	(France) S Huet	2	6^{1}	1
10	(Sweden) T Enqvist	6	7^{7}	6

Third round
7	(Russia) Y Kafelnikov	6	1	3	6^{2}
(Argentina) G Cañas	3	6	6	7^{7}
LL	(Zimbabwe) W Black	5	4	2
10	(Sweden) T Enqvist	7	6	6

Fourth round
(Argentina) G Cañas	3	3	1
10	(Sweden) T Enqvist	6	6	6

==== Section 6 ====
First round
16	(Belarus) V Voltchkov	3	7^{11}	6^{8}	5
(Russia) M Youzhny	6	6^{9}	7^{10}	7
(France) A Dupuis	6	5	6^{2}	6	6
Q	(Philippines) C Mamiit	4	7	7^{7}	3	1
(Australia) W Arthurs	5	2	4
(Belarus) M Mirnyi	7	6	6
(Argentina) M Zabaleta	5	1	3
20	(France) F Santoro	7	6	6
27	(Morocco) H Arazi	7^{7}	6	6
(Spain) D Sánchez	6^{4}	2	3
(Argentina) A Calleri	7^{7}	3	3	3
(Belgium) O Rochus	6^{5}	6	6	6
(Czech Republic) C Doseděl	7	6	1	7^{7}
LL	(Czech Republic) J Vacek	5	1	6	6^{5}
PR	(Czech Republic) D Vacek	2	6^{7}	3
3	(Australia) P Rafter	6	7^{9}	6

Second round
(Russia) M Youzhny	7^{9}	6	6
(France) A Dupuis	6^{7}	3	2
(Belarus) M Mirnyi	6^{4}	1	4
20	(France) F Santoro	7^{7}	6	6
27	(Morocco) H Arazi	7^{7}	7^{7}	7^{7}
(Belgium) O Rochus	6^{3}	6^{3}	6^{3}
(Czech Republic) C Doseděl	5	6	4	1
3	(Australia) P Rafter	7	4	6	6

Third round
(Russia) M Youzhny	7	6	2
20	(France) F Santoro	5	0	0^{r}
27	(Morocco) H Arazi	6^{3}	4	5
3	(Australia) P Rafter	7^{7}	6	7

Fourth round
(Russia) M Youzhny	6	3	2	5
3	(Australia) P Rafter	2	6	6	7

==== Section 7 ====
First round
5	(Australia) L Hewitt	6	6	6
(Sweden) M Gustafsson	1	2	4
(Spain) S Bruguera	0	1	4
Q	(United States) T Dent	6	6	6
(Netherlands) E Kempes	6^{5}	7	6	3	10
(Morocco) Y El Aynaoui	7^{7}	5	3	6	12
(Sweden) A Vinciguerra	6	7^{7}	3	6
28	(Argentina) F Squillari	4	6^{2}	6	4
24	(France) N Escudé	6	6	6
LL	(United States) M Fish	2	3	2
Q	(India) L Paes	6	6	3	7
(Germany) D Elsner	0	1	6	5
(Croatia) I Ljubičić	6^{3}	6^{4}	5
(Germany) R Schüttler	7^{7}	7^{7}	7
(Switzerland) M Kratochvil	3	3	4
9	(France) S Grosjean	6	6	6

Second round
5	(Australia) L Hewitt	1	7	6	6^{2}	6
Q	(United States) T Dent	6	5	3	7^{7}	3
(Morocco) Y El Aynaoui	6	6	7^{7}
(Sweden) A Vinciguerra	1	4	6^{4}
24	(France) N Escudé	6	6	6
Q	(India) L Paes	3	4	2
(Germany) R Schüttler	5	2	6^{6}
9	(France) S Grosjean	7	6	7^{8}

Third round
5	(Australia) L Hewitt	7	5	6	7^{7}
(Morocco) Y El Aynaoui	5	7	4	6^{4}
24	(France) N Escudé	5	6	6	6
9	(France) S Grosjean	7	4	3	4

Fourth round
5	(Australia) L Hewitt	6	4	3	6	4
24	(France) N Escudé	4	6	6	4	6

==== Section 8 ====
First round
14	(South Africa) W Ferreira	6^{4}	3	0^{r}
(Russia) A Stoliarov	7^{7}	6	3
(Czech Republic) M Tabara	2	3	5
(France) C Pioline	6	6	7
(Netherlands) J Siemerink	6^{5}	4	4
WC	(Denmark) K Pless	7^{7}	6	6
(Spain) Á Calatrava	6	3	1	4
19	(Germany) N Kiefer	2	6	6	6
29	(Argentina) G Coria	4	6	6	4	3
(Brazil) F Meligeni	6	3	0	6	6
(Chile) N Massú	6	3	6	6
WC	(United Kingdom) L Childs	4	6	1	4
WC	(United Kingdom) J Delgado	6	6	7
(Ukraine) A Medvedev	2	4	5
(Netherlands) P Wessels	6^{1}	4	4
2	(United States) A Agassi	7^{7}	6	6

Second round
(Russia) A Stoliarov	3	6^{3}	6	6	12
(France) C Pioline	6	7^{7}	4	3	10
WC	(Denmark) K Pless	6^{1}	2	4
19	(Germany) N Kiefer	7^{7}	6	6
(Brazil) F Meligeni	4	6	6^{2}	7^{7}	3
(Chile) N Massú	6	2	7^{7}	6^{3}	6
WC	(United Kingdom) J Delgado	2	4	3
2	(United States) A Agassi	6	6	6

Third round
(Russia) A Stoliarov	6^{5}	4	7^{7}	3
19	(Germany) N Kiefer	7^{7}	6	6^{4}	6
(Chile) N Massú	3	1	1
2	(United States) A Agassi	6	6	6

Fourth round
19	(Germany) N Kiefer	3	5	5
2	(United States) A Agassi	6	7	7

== Notes ==
Preceded by 2001 French Open – Men's singles	Grand Slam men's singles	Succeeded by 2001 US Open – Men's singles
