= David Miketa =

Czech tennis player

- Full name: David Miketa
- Country (sports): Czech Republic
- Born: 4 June 1975 (age 51) Prague, Czechoslovakia
- Plays: Right-handed
- Prize money: $101,371

Singles
- Career record: 0–5
- Career titles: 0
- Highest ranking: No. 175 (29 November 1999)

Grand Slam singles results
- French Open: Q1 (2000)
- Wimbledon: Q3 (1999)
- US Open: Q1 (1999)

Doubles
- Career record: 2–5
- Career titles: 0
- Highest ranking: No. 262 (11 November 2002)

David Miketa (born 4 June 1975) is a former professional tennis player from the Czech Republic.

== Biography ==
Miketa, a right-handed player from Prague, competed in the boy's events at Wimbledon as a junior before turning professional in 1993. He featured in three editions of the Prague Open, in addition to main draw appearances at the Romanian Open in 1999 and the 2000 Mercedes Cup in Stuttgart. Although he exited in the first round of all the ATP Tour tournaments he played, he held six match points against world number 22 Tommy Haas in Stuttgart, before going down in three sets. As a doubles player he twice made quarter-finals, at Prague in 1994 and Stuttgart in 2000, both times partnering David Škoch. He won two Challenger titles in doubles.

== Challenger titles ==
=== Doubles: (2) ===
No.	Year	Tournament	Surface	Partner	Opponents	Score
1.	1999	Bressanone, Italy	Clay	(Czech Republic) Radovan Světlík	(Italy) Manuel Jorquera (Germany) Anthony Parun	7–5, 6–4
2.	2001	Prague, Czech Republic	Clay	(Czech Republic) Lukáš Dlouhý	(Slovakia) Karol Beck (Slovakia) Igor Zelenay	6–1, 4–6, 6–3
