= Ota Fukárek =

Czech tennis player (born 1977)

- Country (sports): Czech Republic
- Residence: Jablonec nad Nisou, Czech Republic
- Born: 18 January 1977 (age 48); Jablonec nad Nisou, Czechoslovakia
- Height: 1.90 m (6 ft 3 in)
- Turned pro: 1995
- Retired: 2005
- Plays: Right-handed
- Prize money: $387,322

Singles
- Career record: 2–13 (at ATP Tour level, Grand Slam level, and in Davis Cup)
- Career titles: 0
- Highest ranking: No. 101 (26 November 2001)

Grand Slam singles results
- Australian Open: 1R (2001, 2002)
- French Open: -
- Wimbledon: -
- US Open: -

Doubles
- Career record: 20–28 (at ATP Tour level and Grand Slam level, and in Davis Cup)
- Career titles: 0
- Highest ranking: No. 58 (17 February 2003)

Grand Slam doubles results
- Australian Open: 3R (2003)
- French Open: 3R (2002)
- Wimbledon: 2R (2003)
- US Open: 2R (2002)

Ota Fukárek (born 18 January 1977) is a retired tennis player from Czech Republic.

== Singles titles ==
=== Wins (4) ===
Legend (singles)
Grand Slam (0)
ATP World Tour Masters 1000 (0)
ATP World Tour 500 (0)
ATP World Tour 250 (0)
ATP Challenger Tour (4)

No.	Date	Tournament	Surface	Opponent	Score
1.	9 August 1999	Madrid, Spain	Hard	(Japan) Gouichi Motomura	6–2, 6–7, 7–5
2.	26 February 2001	Singapore	Hard	(Italy) Federico Luzzi	7–6^{(7–5)}, 6–3
3.	10 September 2001	Zabrze, Poland	Clay	(Germany) Michael Kohlmann	6–3, 6–4
4.	19 November 2001	Prague, Czech Republic	Hard	(Italy) Cristiano Caratti	6–3, 6–3

=== Runners-up (3) ===
No.	Date	Tournament	Surface	Opponent in the final	Score in the final
1.	9 April 2001	San Luis Potosí, Mexico	Clay	(Argentina) Martín Rodríguez	6–7^{(7–9)}, 7–6^{(7–2)}, 7–6^{(10–8)}
2.	15 October 2001	Helsinki, Finland	Hard	(Switzerland) George Bastl	6–4, 4–6, 6–4
3.	11 March 2002	North Miami Beach, United States	Hard	(United States) Vince Spadea	4–6, 6–1, 6–4

== Doubles titles ==
=== Wins (15) ===
Legend (singles)
Grand Slam (0)
ATP World Tour Masters 1000 (0)
ATP World Tour 500 (0)
ATP World Tour 250 (0)
ATP Challenger Tour (15)

No.	Date	Tournament	Surface	Partner	Opponents	Score
1.	22 June 1998	Příbram, Czech Republic	Clay	(Austria) Udo Plamberger	(Czech Republic) Petr Pála (Czech Republic) Radek Štěpánek	2–6, 6–3, 6–4
2.	5 October 1998	Santiago, Chile	Clay	(Hungary) Attila Sávolt	(Netherlands) Edwin Kempes (Netherlands) Peter Wessels	7–6, 6–4
3.	7 August 2000	Prague, Czech Republic	Clay	(Czech Republic) František Čermák	(Czech Republic) Tomáš Cibulec (Czech Republic) Leoš Friedl	6–4, 6–3
4.	13 November 2000	Osaka, Japan	Hard	(Czech Republic) František Čermák	(Japan) Yaoki Ishii (United States) Eric Taino	6–1, 7–6^{(7–5)}
5.	12 February 2001	Bombay, India	Hard	(Czech Republic) František Čermák	(India) Mahesh Bhupathi (India) Fazaluddin Syed	7–5, 3–6, 7–6^{(7–2)}
6.	2 April 2001	Calabasas, United States	Hard	(Switzerland) Ivo Heuberger	(Australia) Paul Hanley (Australia) Nathan Healey	6–2, 3–6, 6–1
7.	1 April 2002	León, Mexico	Hard	(Israel) Noam Behr	(Switzerland) Yves Allegro (Germany) Alexander Waske	7–6^{(8–6)}, 6–3
8.	13 May 2002	Prague, Czech Republic	Clay	(Czech Republic) František Čermák	(Czech Republic) Jaroslav Levinský (Czech Republic) David Škoch	6–4, 6–3
9.	4 June 2002	Prostějov, Czech Republic	Clay	(Czech Republic) František Čermák	(Argentina) Mariano Hood (Argentina) Sebastián Prieto	6–3, 7–6^{(7–5)}
10.	5 August 2002	Córdoba, Spain	Hard	(South Africa) Paul Rosner	(Spain) Emilio Benfele Álvarez (Federal Republic of Yugoslavia) Dušan Vemić	7–6^{(9–7)}, 6–4
11.	10 February 2003	Lübeck, Germany	Carpet	(Australia) Jordan Kerr	(Sweden) Robert Lindstedt (Sweden) Fredrik Lovén	6–3, 3–6, 6–3
12.	21 April 2003	León, Mexico	Hard	(Australia) Jordan Kerr	(United States) Alex Bogomolov, Jr. (Mexico) Alejandro Hernández	4–6, 6–3, 6–4
13.	28 July 2003	Segovia, Spain	Hard	(United States) Tripp Phillips	(France) Jean-François Bachelot (Spain) Emilio Benfele Álvarez	6–4, 7–6^{(10–8)}
14.	11 August 2003	Graz, Austria	Hard	(Israel) Noam Behr	(Germany) Karsten Braasch (Sweden) Johan Landsberg	6–3, 6–2
15.	7 September 2004	Aschaffenburg, Germany	Clay	(Czech Republic) Jan Vacek	(Hungary) Kornél Bardóczky (Hungary) Gergely Kisgyörgy	3–6, 6–4, 6–3

=== Runners-up (11) ===
No.	Date	Tournament	Surface	Partner	Opponents	Score
1.	13 April 1998	Puerto Vallarta, Mexico	Hard	(France) Régis Lavergne	(Mexico) Luis Herrera (Romania) Gabriel Trifu	6–3, 6–4
2.	17 August 1998	Bronx, United States	Hard	(Romania) Gabriel Trifu	(United States) Jared Palmer (Japan) Takao Suzuki	6–1, 6–2
3.	2 August 1999	Segovia, Spain	Hard	(Mexico) Alejandro Hernández	(Switzerland) Roger Federer (Netherlands) Sander Groen	6–4, 7–6
4.	16 May 2000	Edinburgh, United Kingdom	Clay	(Germany) Lars Burgsmüller	(Spain) Tommy Robredo (United States) Michael Russell	6–0, 6–2
5.	6 November 2000	Seoul, South Korea	Hard	(Czech Republic) František Čermák	(Australia) Tim Crichton (Australia) Ashley Fisher	6–4, 6–4
6.	20 November 2000	Brest, France	Hard	(Czech Republic) František Čermák	(Finland) Tuomas Ketola (Italy) Laurence Tieleman	7–6^{(5)}, 1–6, 6–3
7.	5 November 2001	Bratislava, Slovakia	Carpet	(Czech Republic) František Čermák	(Czech Republic) Petr Luxa (Czech Republic) Radek Štěpánek	6–4, 6–3
8.	7 January 2002	Chennai, India	Hard	(Czech Republic) Tomáš Cibulec	(India) Mahesh Bhupathi (India) Leander Paes	5–7, 6–2, 7–5
9.	21 January 2002	Heilbronn, Germany	Carpet	(Czech Republic) František Čermák	(North Macedonia) Aleksandar Kitinov (Sweden) Johan Landsberg	6–7^{(5–7)}, 6–3, 6–1
10.	11 March 2002	North Miami Beach, United States	Hard	(United States) Jim Thomas	(United States) Eric Nunez (United States) Graydon Oliver	3–6, 7–6^{(7–5)}, 7–5
11.	5 July 2004	Budaörs, Hungary	Clay	(France) Stéphane Robert	(Argentina) Ignacio González (Spain) Gabriel Trujillo	3–6, 6–2, 6–3
