= 2001 Australian Open – Women's singles qualifying =

Women's singles qualifying
- 2001 Australian Open

Events
Singles	men	women		boys	girls
Doubles	men	women	mixed	boys	girls
WC Singles	men	women	quad
WC Doubles	men	women	quad
Legends	men	women	mixed

Qualification
Singles	men	women
- Australian Open

This article displays the qualifying draw for the women's singles event at the 2001 Australian Open.

== Players ==
=== Seeds ===
1. (United States) Allison Bradshaw (second round)
2. (Germany) Andrea Glass (Qualifier)
3. (Russia) Lina Krasnoroutskaya (Qualifier)
4. (Romania) Cătălina Cristea (second round)
5. (United States) Dawn Buth (first round)
6. (Slovakia) Ľudmila Cervanová (final round)
7. (Slovenia) Katarina Srebotnik (final round)
8. (Germany) Bianka Lamade (final round)
9. (Japan) Yuka Yoshida (final round)
10. (Czech Republic) Sandra Kleinová (second round)
11. (United States) Sandra Cacic (first round)
12. (Belgium) Laurence Courtois (first round)
13. (Russia) Elena Bovina (Qualifier)
14. (China) Li Na (first round)
15. (Germany) Anca Barna (Qualifier)
16. (Spain) Nuria Llagostera (Qualifier)
17. (Venezuela) Milagros Sequera (final round)
18. (United States) Jill Craybas (Qualifier)
19. (France) Alexandra Fusai (Qualifier)
20. (Germany) Gréta Arn (Qualifier)
21. (Germany) Angelika Bachmann (second round)
22. (Slovakia) Janette Husárová (Qualifier)
23. (Czech Republic) Alena Vašková (first round)
24. (Spain) María José Martínez (Qualifier)

=== Qualifiers ===
1. (France) Alexandra Fusai
2. (Germany) Andrea Glass
3. (Russia) Lina Krasnoroutskaya
4. (Croatia) Maja Palaveršić
5. (Spain) María José Martínez
6. (Germany) Anca Barna
7. (Spain) Nuria Llagostera
8. (Russia) Elena Bovina
9. (United States) Jill Craybas
10. (Germany) Gréta Arn
11. (France) Laurence Andretto
12. (Slovakia) Janette Husárová

== Qualifying draw ==
Key

- Q = Qualifier
- WC = Wild card
- LL = Lucky loser
- Alt = Alternate
- ITF = ITF entry
- PR = Protected ranking
- SR = Special ranking
- SE = Special exempt
- JE = Junior exempt
- JR = Junior Accelerator Programme entrant
- CO = College Accelerator Programme entrant
- NG = Next Gen Accelerator Program entrant
- w/o = Walkover
- r = Retired
- d = Defaulted

=== First qualifier ===
First round
1	(United States) Allison Bradshaw	6	6
(Slovenia) Petra Rampre	1	4
WC	(Australia) Nadia Johnston	4	3
(India) Nirupama Vaidyanathan	6	6
(United Kingdom) Lucie Ahl	3	4
(Hungary) Petra Mandula	6	6
(Germany) Vanessa Henke	3	1
19	(France) Alexandra Fusai	6	6

Second round
1	(United States) Allison Bradshaw	3	5
(India) Nirupama Vaidyanathan	6	7
(Hungary) Petra Mandula	3	3
19	(France) Alexandra Fusai	6	6

Final Round
(India) Nirupama Vaidyanathan	5	6	2
19	(France) Alexandra Fusai	7	2	6

=== Second qualifier ===
First round
2	(Germany) Andrea Glass	7^{7}	6
(Hungary) Kira Nagy	6^{5}	2
(Bulgaria) Desislava Topalova	6	7
(Italy) Laura Dell'Angelo	3	5
(Czech Republic) Michaela Paštiková	7	6^{2}	6
(Czech Republic) Lenka Němečková	5	7^{7}	2
(Slovenia) Tina Hergold	4	3
17	(Venezuela) Milagros Sequera	6	6

Second round
2	(Germany) Andrea Glass	6	4	6
(Bulgaria) Desislava Topalova	3	6	2
(Czech Republic) Michaela Paštiková	5	3
17	(Venezuela) Milagros Sequera	7	6

Final Round
2	(Germany) Andrea Glass	6	6
17	(Venezuela) Milagros Sequera	3	3

=== Third qualifier ===
First round
3	(Russia) Lina Krasnoroutskaya	6	6
WC	(Australia) Jaslyn Hewitt	2	1
(Czech Republic) Zuzana Ondrášková	6	6
(France) Stéphanie Foretz	2	1
(Italy) Maria Elena Camerin	1	6	8
(South Korea) Yoon-Jeong Cho	6	3	6
(Belgium) Daphne van de Zande	5	3
21	(Germany) Angelika Bachmann	7	6

Second round
3	(Russia) Lina Krasnoroutskaya	7	6
(Czech Republic) Zuzana Ondrášková	5	3
(Italy) Maria Elena Camerin	3	6	7
21	(Germany) Angelika Bachmann	6	3	5

Final Round
3	(Russia) Lina Krasnoroutskaya	7	6
(Italy) Maria Elena Camerin	5	3

=== Fourth qualifier ===
First round
4	(Romania) Cătălina Cristea	1	6	6
(Canada) Renata Kolbovic	6	2	4
(Bulgaria) Antoaneta Pandjerova	2	2
(Croatia) Maja Palaveršić	6	6
(Republic of Ireland) Kelly Liggan	7^{7}	6
WC	(Australia) Kristen van Elden	6^{3}	3
(France) Sophie Georges	7^{7}	6
14	(China) Li Na	6^{2}	3

Second round
4	(Romania) Cătălina Cristea	2	5
(Croatia) Maja Palaveršić	6	7
(Republic of Ireland) Kelly Liggan	5	6	6
(France) Sophie Georges	7	3	1

Final Round
(Croatia) Maja Palaveršić	7^{7}	6
(Republic of Ireland) Kelly Liggan	6^{5}	4

=== Fifth qualifier ===
First round
5	(United States) Dawn Buth	3	5
(Morocco) Bahia Mouhtassine	6	7
(Slovenia) Maja Matevžič	6	1	2
(Spain) Gisela Riera	1	6	6
(Netherlands) Seda Noorlander	6	6
(Czech Republic) Jana Hlaváčková	1	3
(Italy) Francesca Lubiani	6^{1}	5
24	(Spain) María José Martínez	7^{7}	7

Second round
(Morocco) Bahia Mouhtassine	6	4	6
(Spain) Gisela Riera	2	6	0
(Netherlands) Seda Noorlander	5	2
24	(Spain) María José Martínez	7	6

Final Round
(Morocco) Bahia Mouhtassine	6	4	9
24	(Spain) María José Martínez	4	6	11

=== Sixth qualifier ===
First round
6	(Slovakia) Ľudmila Cervanová	6	4	6
(Czech Republic) Klára Koukalová	3	6	1
(France) Karolina Jagieniak	6	6
(Czech Republic) Hana Šromová	2	1
(Czech Republic) Eva Krejčová	6	6
(Tunisia) Selima Sfar	4	2
(Spain) Ainhoa Goñi	6^{3}	3
15	(Germany) Anca Barna	7^{7}	6

Second round
6	(Slovakia) Ľudmila Cervanová	7	6
(France) Karolina Jagieniak	5	4
(Czech Republic) Eva Krejčová	2	6^{3}
15	(Germany) Anca Barna	6	7^{7}

Final Round
6	(Slovakia) Ľudmila Cervanová	6	1	3
15	(Germany) Anca Barna	3	6	6

=== Seventh qualifier ===
First round
7	(Slovenia) Katarina Srebotnik	7^{7}	4	6
(United States) Sarah Taylor	6^{2}	6	2
(Spain) Conchita Martínez Granados	4	7^{7}	1
(Australia) Mireille Dittmann	6	6^{3}	6
(Serbia and Montenegro) Dragana Zarić	3	0
(Kazakhstan) Irina Selyutina	6	6
WC	(Australia) Samantha Stosur	2	3
16	(Spain) Nuria Llagostera	6	6

Second round
7	(Slovenia) Katarina Srebotnik	6	6
(Australia) Mireille Dittmann	3	2
(Kazakhstan) Irina Selyutina	3	1
16	(Spain) Nuria Llagostera	6	6

Final Round
7	(Slovenia) Katarina Srebotnik	1	6^{6}
16	(Spain) Nuria Llagostera	6	7^{8}

=== Eighth qualifier ===
First round
8	(Germany) Bianka Lamade	6	6
WC	(Australia) Monique Adamczak	3	4
(Spain) Eva Bes	7^{7}	6
WC	(Australia) Amy Jensen	6^{2}	4
(Denmark) Eva Dyrberg	4	6	2
WC	(Australia) Kerry-Anne Guse	6	3	6
(Germany) Adriana Barna	2	0
13	(Russia) Elena Bovina	6	6

Second round
8	(Germany) Bianka Lamade	6	6
(Spain) Eva Bes	3	3
WC	(Australia) Kerry-Anne Guse	0	6	3
13	(Russia) Elena Bovina	6	3	6

Final Round
8	(Germany) Bianka Lamade	7^{7}	6^{5}	0
13	(Russia) Elena Bovina	6^{1}	7^{7}	6

=== Ninth qualifier ===
First round
9	(Japan) Yuka Yoshida	6	6
(Ukraine) Julia Vakulenko	0	0
(Spain) Rosa María Andrés	6	6
(Australia) Lisa McShea	4	3
(Canada) Marie-Ève Pelletier	6	6^{4}	6
(Spain) Mariam Ramón Climent	4	7^{7}	1
WC	(Australia) Jenny Belobrajdic	1	6^{2}
18	(United States) Jill Craybas	6	7^{7}

Second round
9	(Japan) Yuka Yoshida	6	6
(Spain) Rosa María Andrés	4	4
(Canada) Marie-Ève Pelletier	3	3
18	(United States) Jill Craybas	6	6

Final Round
9	(Japan) Yuka Yoshida	5	3
18	(United States) Jill Craybas	7	6

=== Tenth qualifier ===
First round
10	(Czech Republic) Sandra Kleinová	6	6
(Poland) Anna Żarska	1	3
(Austria) Evelyn Fauth	1	3
(Hungary) Zsófia Gubacsi	6	6
(Austria) Marion Maruska	6	6
(Czech Republic) Eva Martincová	0	3
(Australia) Trudi Musgrave	2	3
20	(Germany) Gréta Arn	6	6

Second round
10	(Czech Republic) Sandra Kleinová	5	6	8
(Hungary) Zsófia Gubacsi	7	1	10
(Austria) Marion Maruska	2	6	6
20	(Germany) Gréta Arn	6	3	8

Final Round
(Hungary) Zsófia Gubacsi	0	1
20	(Germany) Gréta Arn	6	6

=== Eleventh qualifier ===
First round
11	(United States) Sandra Cacic	5	4
(Argentina) María Emilia Salerni	7	6
(Italy) Antonella Serra Zanetti	6^{9}	3
(France) Laurence Andretto	7^{11}	6
(Italy) Alice Canepa	3	3
(Germany) Angelika Rösch	6	6
(Japan) Saori Obata	6^{4}	6	6
23	(Czech Republic) Alena Vašková	7^{7}	4	1

Second round
(Argentina) María Emilia Salerni	6	3	4
(France) Laurence Andretto	2	6	6
(Germany) Angelika Rösch	1	6^{5}
(Japan) Saori Obata	6	7^{7}

Final Round
(France) Laurence Andretto	6	2	6
(Japan) Saori Obata	3	6	3

=== Twelfth qualifier ===
First round
12	(Belgium) Laurence Courtois	5	7	5
(Madagascar) Dally Randriantefy	7	5	7
(Germany) Miriam Schnitzer	3	6	6
(United Kingdom) Lorna Woodroffe	6	3	3
(Slovenia) Tina Križan	2	3
(South Korea) Kim Eun-ha	6	6
(Ukraine) Tatiana Perebiynis	6	4	1
22	(Slovakia) Janette Husárová	1	6	6

Second round
(Madagascar) Dally Randriantefy	6	2
(Germany) Miriam Schnitzer	0	5^{r}
(South Korea) Kim Eun-ha	0	5
22	(Slovakia) Janette Husárová	6	7

Final Round
(Madagascar) Dally Randriantefy	6^{5}	6^{7}
22	(Slovakia) Janette Husárová	7^{7}	7^{9}
