= 2001 Australian Open – Men's singles qualifying =

Men's singles qualifying
- 2001 Australian Open

Events
Singles	men	women		boys	girls
Doubles	men	women	mixed	boys	girls
WC Singles	men	women	quad
WC Doubles	men	women	quad
Legends	men	women	mixed

Qualification
Singles	men	women
- Australian Open

This article displays the qualifying draw for the Men's Singles at the 2001 Australian Open.

== Seeds ==
1. (Russia) Andrei Stoliarov (qualified)
2. (France) Antony Dupuis (second round)
3. (Spain) Tommy Robredo (qualified)
4. (France) Cyril Saulnier (qualifying competition)
5. (Czech Republic) Tomáš Zíb (second round)
6. (Belgium) Xavier Malisse (first round)
7. (Netherlands) Edwin Kempes (qualifying competition)
8. (South Africa) Neville Godwin (qualifying competition)
9. (Canada) Sébastien Lareau (first round)
10. (Netherlands) Peter Wessels (qualified)
11. (Croatia) Goran Ivanišević (first round)
12. (Russia) Nikolay Davydenko (qualified)
13. (Italy) Laurence Tieleman (first round)
14. (Haiti) Ronald Agénor (second round)
15. (South Korea) Yoon Yong-il (first round)
16. (France) Nicolas Coutelot (first round)
17. (United States) Kevin Kim (second round)
18. (Denmark) Kristian Pless (first round)
19. (Germany) Tomas Behrend (qualified)
20. (Hungary) Attila Sávolt (first round)
21. (United States) Bob Bryan (second round)
22. (Austria) Julian Knowle (second round)
23. (Germany) Oliver Gross (first round)
24. (United Kingdom) Arvind Parmar (first round)
25. (United States) Michael Russell (qualified)
26. (Italy) Cristiano Caratti (second round)
27. (South Africa) Kevin Ullyett (second round)
28. (France) Michaël Llodra (second round)
29. (Slovakia) Ján Krošlák (qualifying competition)
30. (Italy) Stefano Tarallo (first round)
31. (Italy) Filippo Volandri (first round)
32. (Georgia (country)) Irakli Labadze (first round)

== Qualifiers ==
1. (Russia) Andrei Stoliarov
2. (Argentina) Guillermo Cañas
3. (Spain) Tommy Robredo
4. (United States) Alex O'Brien
5. (Socialist Federal Republic of Yugoslavia) Nenad Zimonjić
6. (Germany) Tomas Behrend
7. (United States) Michael Russell
8. (Russia) Yuri Schukin
9. (Slovakia) Ladislav Švarc
10. (Netherlands) Peter Wessels
11. (Czech Republic) Ota Fukárek
12. (Russia) Nikolay Davydenko
13. (France) Jean-René Lisnard
14. (Germany) Lars Burgsmüller
15. (South Africa) Marcos Ondruska
16. (Switzerland) Ivo Heuberger

== Qualifying draw ==
Key

- Q = Qualifier
- WC = Wild card
- LL = Lucky loser
- Alt = Alternate
- ITF = ITF entry
- PR = Protected ranking
- SR = Special ranking
- SE = Special exempt
- JE = Junior exempt
- JR = Junior Accelerator Programme entrant
- CO = College Accelerator Programme entrant
- NG = Next Gen Accelerator Program entrant
- w/o = Walkover
- r = Retired
- d = Defaulted

=== First qualifier ===
First round
1	(Russia) Andrei Stoliarov	6^{2}	6	6
WC	(Australia) Todd Larkham	7^{7}	1	3
(Spain) Julián Alonso	3	4
(Argentina) Sergio Roitman	6	6
(Croatia) Ivo Karlović	6^{4}	6	6
(Sweden) Marcus Sarstrand	7^{7}	4	4
(France) Éric Prodon	2	7	6
31	(Italy) Filippo Volandri	6	5	1

Second round
1	(Russia) Andrei Stoliarov	7^{7}	7^{7}
(Argentina) Sergio Roitman	6^{1}	6^{2}
(Croatia) Ivo Karlović	6^{13}	6	11
(France) Éric Prodon	7^{15}	3	9

Qualifying competition
1	(Russia) Andrei Stoliarov	7^{7}	6^{3}	13
(Croatia) Ivo Karlović	6^{4}	7^{7}	11

=== Second qualifier ===
First round
2	(France) Antony Dupuis	1	6	6
(Sweden) Fredrik Jonsson	6	3	3
(Argentina) Guillermo Cañas	6	6
(United Kingdom) Barry Cowan	4	4
(Russia) Dmitry Vlasov	6	6
(Sweden) Johan Settergren	3	2
(Norway) Jan Frode Andersen	6	6^{10}	1^{r}
29	(Slovakia) Ján Krošlák	1	7^{12}	0

Second round
2	(France) Antony Dupuis	3	4
(Argentina) Guillermo Cañas	6	6
(Russia) Dmitry Vlasov	6^{4}	1
29	(Slovakia) Ján Krošlák	7^{7}	6

Qualifying competition
(Argentina) Guillermo Cañas	6^{3}	6	6
29	(Slovakia) Ján Krošlák	7^{7}	3	3

=== Third qualifier ===
First round
3	(Spain) Tommy Robredo	6	4
(Azerbaijan) Emin Ağayev	4	1^{r}
(Germany) Andy Fahlke	6	3	0
(Argentina) Gastón Etlis	4	6	6
(France) Jean-Michel Pequery	6^{7}	3
(United States) Jeff Salzenstein	7^{9}	6
(Japan) Gouichi Motomura	6	6
23	(Germany) Oliver Gross	3	2

Second round
3	(Spain) Tommy Robredo	6	6
(Argentina) Gastón Etlis	1	3
(United States) Jeff Salzenstein	3	2
(Japan) Gouichi Motomura	6	6

Qualifying competition
3	(Spain) Tommy Robredo	0	6	6
(Japan) Gouichi Motomura	6	2	2

=== Fourth qualifier ===
First round
4	(France) Cyril Saulnier	6	7^{7}
(Australia) James Sekulov	4	6^{5}
(Italy) Federico Luzzi	4	6	6
(Romania) Ionuț Moldovan	6	3	4
(United States) Alex O'Brien	3	6	6
(Austria) Zbynek Mlynarik	6	3	4
(Czech Republic) Jan Vacek	1	5
27	(South Africa) Kevin Ullyett	6	7

Second round
4	(France) Cyril Saulnier	6	6
(Italy) Federico Luzzi	4	3
(United States) Alex O'Brien	6	7^{8}
27	(South Africa) Kevin Ullyett	1	6^{6}

Qualifying competition
4	(France) Cyril Saulnier	0	4
(United States) Alex O'Brien	6	6

=== Fifth qualifier ===
First round
5	(Czech Republic) Tomáš Zíb	7	6
(Italy) Marzio Martelli	5	4
(Thailand) Danai Udomchoke	5	4
(Federal Republic of Yugoslavia) Nenad Zimonjić	7	6
(Spain) Álex López Morón	6	1	4
(France) Olivier Patience	2	6	6
(Germany) Jakub Záhlava	1	4
28	(France) Michaël Llodra	6	6

Second round
5	(Czech Republic) Tomáš Zíb	6	6^{5}	7
(Federal Republic of Yugoslavia) Nenad Zimonjić	4	7^{7}	9
(France) Olivier Patience	2	7^{7}	8
28	(France) Michaël Llodra	6	6^{3}	6

Qualifying competition
(Federal Republic of Yugoslavia) Nenad Zimonjić	6	6
(France) Olivier Patience	0	3

=== Sixth qualifier ===
First round
6	(Belgium) Xavier Malisse	4	4
(United States) James Blake	6	6
(Austria) Clemens Trimmel	6	1	2
WC	(Australia) Joseph Sirianni	2	6	6
(United States) Michael Joyce	6	6
(Brazil) Francisco Costa	2	2
WC	(Australia) Todd Reid	2	3
19	(Germany) Tomas Behrend	6	6

Second round
(United States) James Blake	6	6
WC	(Australia) Joseph Sirianni	4	2
(United States) Michael Joyce	6	6^{7}	4
19	(Germany) Tomas Behrend	4	7^{9}	6

Qualifying competition
(United States) James Blake	5	6^{5}
19	(Germany) Tomas Behrend	7	7^{7}

=== Seventh qualifier ===
First round
7	(Netherlands) Edwin Kempes	6	6
WC	(Australia) Lee Pearson	4	3
(United States) Zack Fleishman	6^{5}	6^{4}
(Canada) Simon Larose	7^{7}	7^{7}
WC	(Australia) Peter Luczak	6	3	6
(United Kingdom) Jamie Delgado	2	6	8
(Greece) Vasilis Mazarakis	6	3	5
25	(United States) Michael Russell	3	6	7

Second round
7	(Netherlands) Edwin Kempes	7^{7}	6
(Canada) Simon Larose	6^{1}	1
(United Kingdom) Jamie Delgado	5	4
25	(United States) Michael Russell	7	6

Qualifying competition
7	(Netherlands) Edwin Kempes	6	4	5
25	(United States) Michael Russell	1	6	7

=== Eighth qualifier ===
First round
8	(South Africa) Neville Godwin	6	6
WC	(Australia) Paul Baccanello	1	3
(Italy) Stefano Galvani	6	6
(Czech Republic) Jan Hernych	3	3
(Czech Republic) Robin Vik	6	6^{4}	6
(Russia) Yuri Schukin	0	7^{7}	8
(United States) Eric Taino	7^{7}	1	11
18	(Denmark) Kristian Pless	6^{2}	6	9

Second round
8	(South Africa) Neville Godwin	6	2	9
(Italy) Stefano Galvani	1	6	7
(Russia) Yuri Schukin	7	6
(United States) Eric Taino	5	1

Qualifying competition
8	(South Africa) Neville Godwin	6	1	4
(Russia) Yuri Schukin	4	6	6

=== Ninth qualifier ===
First round
9	(Canada) Sébastien Lareau	3	6	2
(Italy) Leonardo Azzaro	6	4	6
(Austria) Werner Eschauer	5	6	6
(Pakistan) Aisam-ul-Haq Qureshi	7	3	2
(Germany) Michael Kohlmann	7	7
WC	(Australia) Paul Hanley	5	5
(Slovakia) Ladislav Švarc	6	6
32	(Georgia (country)) Irakli Labadze	2	4

Second round
(Italy) Leonardo Azzaro	6	3	7
(Austria) Werner Eschauer	1	6	5
(Germany) Michael Kohlmann	3	6^{5}
(Slovakia) Ladislav Švarc	6	7^{7}

Qualifying competition
(Italy) Leonardo Azzaro	4	1
(Slovakia) Ladislav Švarc	6	6

=== Tenth qualifier ===
First round
10	(Netherlands) Peter Wessels	6^{0}	6	6
(Italy) Filippo Messori	7^{7}	4	2
(France) Cedric Kauffmann	3
(United States) Taylor Dent	1^{r}
(Italy) Mosé Navarra	6	6
(Argentina) Mariano Hood	4	2
(Spain) Juan Albert Viloca	1	6^{4}
21	(United States) Bob Bryan	6	7^{7}

Second round
10	(Netherlands) Peter Wessels	7	6
(France) Cedric Kauffmann	5	4
(Italy) Mosé Navarra	6	6
21	(United States) Bob Bryan	2	1

Qualifying competition
10	(Netherlands) Peter Wessels	7	6
(Italy) Mosé Navarra	5	4

=== Eleventh qualifier ===
First round
11	(Croatia) Goran Ivanišević	5	6	1
(Czech Republic) Petr Luxa	7	1	6
(France) Jean-François Bachelot	1	3
(Uzbekistan) Oleg Ogorodov	6	6
(New Zealand) Mark Nielsen	4	7^{7}	3
(Czech Republic) Ota Fukárek	6	6^{4}	6
(Germany) Marc-Kevin Goellner	6	4	5
22	(Austria) Julian Knowle	3	6	7

Second round
(Czech Republic) Petr Luxa	6^{3}	7	3
(Uzbekistan) Oleg Ogorodov	7^{7}	5	6
(Czech Republic) Ota Fukárek	7^{7}	1	8
22	(Austria) Julian Knowle	6^{5}	6	6

Qualifying competition
(Uzbekistan) Oleg Ogorodov	4	2
(Czech Republic) Ota Fukárek	6	6

=== Twelfth qualifier ===
First round
12	(Russia) Nikolay Davydenko	6	4	6
(Czech Republic) Petr Kralert	1	6	3
(United Kingdom) Martin Lee	6	7
(Netherlands) Rogier Wassen	2	5
(Spain) Óscar Burrieza	5	2
(Germany) Björn Phau	7	6
(United States) Brandon Hawk	7	6^{5}	6
24	(United Kingdom) Arvind Parmar	5	7^{7}	2

Second round
12	(Russia) Nikolay Davydenko	7	6
(United Kingdom) Martin Lee	5	4
(Germany) Björn Phau	6	6
(United States) Brandon Hawk	2	1

Qualifying competition
12	(Russia) Nikolay Davydenko	6	6
(Germany) Björn Phau	2	2

=== Thirteenth qualifier ===
First round
13	(Italy) Laurence Tieleman	6^{1}	2
(France) Lionel Roux	7^{7}	6
(France) Jean-René Lisnard	6	7^{7}
(United States) Mike Bryan	2	6^{4}
(Czech Republic) František Čermák	6	6
(Sweden) Johan Örtegren	0	2
(Spain) Salvador Navarro	4	2
17	(United States) Kevin Kim	6	6

Second round
(France) Lionel Roux	4	3
(France) Jean-René Lisnard	6	6
(Czech Republic) František Čermák	6	2	12
17	(United States) Kevin Kim	4	6	10

Qualifying competition
(France) Jean-René Lisnard	5	6	6
(Czech Republic) František Čermák	7	3	0

=== Fourteenth qualifier ===
First round
14	(Haiti) Ronald Agénor	6	7^{7}
(Uzbekistan) Vadim Kutsenko	3	6^{3}
(Greece) Solon Peppas	3	4
(Germany) Lars Burgsmüller	6	6
WC	(Australia) Luke Smith	7^{7}	3	2
(Romania) Răzvan Sabău	6^{2}	6	6
(Belgium) Dick Norman	5	7^{7}	1
26	(Italy) Cristiano Caratti	7	6^{4}	6

Second round
14	(Haiti) Ronald Agénor	0	4
(Germany) Lars Burgsmüller	6	6
(Romania) Răzvan Sabău	6	3	6
26	(Italy) Cristiano Caratti	4	6	3

Qualifying competition
(Germany) Lars Burgsmüller	6	6
(Romania) Răzvan Sabău	3	1

=== Fifteenth qualifier ===
First round
15	(South Korea) Yoon Yong-il	5	4
(India) Leander Paes	7	6
(South Africa) Justin Bower	5	6	6
(Russia) Denis Golovanov	7	4	2
(Egypt) Amr Ghoneim	5	2
(South Africa) Wesley Moodie	7	6
(South Africa) Marcos Ondruska	6	6
30	(Italy) Stefano Tarallo	2	1

Second round
(India) Leander Paes	6	6
(South Africa) Justin Bower	3	4
(South Africa) Wesley Moodie	2	1
(South Africa) Marcos Ondruska	6	6

Qualifying competition
(India) Leander Paes	6	5	3
(South Africa) Marcos Ondruska	3	7	6

=== Sixteenth qualifier ===
First round
16	(France) Nicolas Coutelot	2	7	3
(Switzerland) Ivo Heuberger	6	5	6
WC	(Australia) Josh Tuckfield	1	2
(Germany) Alexander Waske	6	6
(France) Paul-Henri Mathieu	6	6
(Republic of Ireland) Scott Barron	2	2
PR	(Israel) Noam Okun	6	7^{9}
20	(Hungary) Attila Sávolt	3	6^{7}

Second round
(Switzerland) Ivo Heuberger	6	7
(Germany) Alexander Waske	2	5
(France) Paul-Henri Mathieu	5	5
PR	(Israel) Noam Okun	7	7

Qualifying competition
(Switzerland) Ivo Heuberger	6	6
PR	(Israel) Noam Okun	4	4
