= Ytai Abougzir =

American tennis player

- Country (sports): United States
- Born: February 22, 1983 (age 42); Beersheba, Israel
- Height: 5 ft 8 in (173 cm)
- Plays: Right-handed
- Prize money: $13,788

Singles
- Highest ranking: No. 929 (Nov 3, 2003)

Grand Slam singles results
- US Open: Q1 (2001)

Doubles
- Highest ranking: No. 653 (Aug 20, 2007)

Ytai Abougzir (born February 22, 1983) is an Israeli-born American former professional tennis player.

Abougzir, the son of a professional soccer player, was born in the Israeli city of Beersheba and moved to Florida when he was a child.

In junior tennis, Abougzir was ranked as high as two in the world by the ITF and won the boys' doubles title at the 2001 Australian Open with Argentine Luciano Vitullo. He was also a US Open boys' singles semi-finalist.

Most of his appearances on the professional tour were at ITF Futures level and he featured in qualifying at the 2001 US Open. He had best world rankings of 929 in singles and 653 in doubles.

Abougzir played collegiate tennis for Florida State University, where he earned All-ACC honors.

== Junior Grand Slam titles ==
=== Doubles (1) ===
No.	Date	Tournament	Surface	Partner	Opponents	Score
1.	Jan 2001	Australian Open	Hard	(Argentina) Luciano Vitullo	(Canada) Frank Dancevic (Ecuador) Giovanni Lapentti	6–4, 7–6^{(5)}
