= Luciano Vitullo =

Argentine tennis player

- Country (sports): Argentina
- Born: 2 March 1983 (age 42)
- Plays: Right-handed
- Prize money: $20,693

Singles
- Highest ranking: No. 440 (19 Aug 2002)

Doubles
- Highest ranking: No. 627 (12 Jun 2006)

Luciano Vitullo (born 3 February 1983) is an Argentine former professional tennis player.

A native of Carapachay, Vitullo had a promising junior career and was taken under the wing of Paul Annacone, coach of Pete Sampras. He won the Eddie Herr International Junior Championships in 2000 and made the US Open junior semi-finals in 2001. As a doubles player he claimed a junior title at the 2001 Australian Open, partnering Ytai Abougzir.

Vitullo reached a best singles world ranking of 440 and won two ITF Futures titles.

== ITF Futures finals ==
=== Singles: 5 (2–3) ===
Result	W–L	Date	Tournament	Surface	Opponent	Score
Loss	0–1	Aug 2001	Argentina F9, Buenos Aires	Clay	(Argentina) Juan Pablo Brzezicki	6–7^{(2)}, 4–6
Win	1–1	Oct 2001	Paraguay F2, Asunción	Clay	(Argentina) Héctor Moretti	6–4, 6–2
Win	2–1	Jul 2002	USA F18, Pittsburgh	Clay	(Argentina) Matias Boeker	7–6^{(2)}, 6–3
Loss	2–2	Oct 2003	Jamaica F11, Montego Bay	Hard	(Venezuela) Kepler Orellana	3–6, 1–6
Loss	2–3	Oct 2005	Colombia F6, Medellín	Clay	(Colombia) Santiago Giraldo	6–2, 4–6, 5–7

=== Doubles: 4 (2–2) ===
Result	W–L	Date	Tournament	Surface	Partner	Opponents	Score
Loss	0–1	Aug 2000	Argentina F9, Buenos Aires	Clay	(Argentina) Patricio Rudi	(Argentina) Martin Stringari (Italy) Tomas Tenconi	2–4, 4–5^{(2)}, 1–4
Loss	0–2	Sep 2004	Argentina F6, Buenos Aires	Clay	(Australia) Daniel Wendler	(Argentina) Francisco Cabello (Argentina) Diego Junqueira	1–6, 2–6
Win	1–2	Oct 2005	Colombia F5, Barranquilla	Clay	(Argentina) Horacio Zeballos	(Argentina) Brian Dabul (Peru) Iván Miranda	5–7, 7–6^{(4)}, 6–4
Win	2–2	Oct 2005	Colombia F6, Medellín	Clay	(Chile) Felipe Parada	(Colombia) Michael Quintero (Colombia) Sergio Ramirez	6–3, 7–5
