= 2001 Australian Open – Women's singles =

Women's singles
- 2001 Australian Open

Final
- Champion: (United States) Jennifer Capriati
- Runner-up: (Switzerland) Martina Hingis
- Score: 6–4, 6–3
- Date: 27 January 2001

Details
- Draw: 128
- Seeds: 16

Events
Singles	men	women		boys	girls
Doubles	men	women	mixed	boys	girls
WC Singles	men	women	quad
WC Doubles	men	women	quad
Legends	men	women	mixed
- Australian Open

Jennifer Capriati defeated Martina Hingis in the final, 6–4, 6–3 to win the women's singles tennis title at the 2001 Australian Open. It was her first major singles title. With the win, Capriati returned to the top 10 in the WTA rankings for the first time since 1993.

Lindsay Davenport was the defending champion, but lost to Capriati in the semifinals, in a rematch of the previous year's semifinal.

This marked the first time the Australian Open officially adopted equal prize money for both men and women. It was the second major to do so, following the US Open in 1973, and before the Wimbledon Championships and French Open in 2007.

== Seeds ==
1. (Switzerland) Martina Hingis (final)
2. (United States) Lindsay Davenport (semifinals)
3. (United States) Venus Williams (semifinals)
4. (United States) Monica Seles (quarterfinals)
5. (Spain) Conchita Martínez (second round)
6. (United States) Serena Williams (quarterfinals)
7. (France) Mary Pierce (third round)
8. (Russia) Anna Kournikova (quarterfinals)
9. (Russia) Elena Dementieva (third round)
10. (South Africa) Amanda Coetzer (quarterfinals)
11. (United States) Chanda Rubin (first round)
12. (United States) Jennifer Capriati (champion)
13. (France) Amélie Mauresmo (fourth round)
14. (France) Sandrine Testud (third round)
15. (Belgium) Kim Clijsters (fourth round)
16. (United States) Amy Frazier (second round)

== Draw ==
Key

- Q = Qualifier
- WC = Wild card
- LL = Lucky loser
- Alt = Alternate
- ITF = ITF entry
- PR = Protected ranking
- SR = Special ranking
- SE = Special exempt
- JE = Junior exempt
- JR = Junior Accelerator Programme entrant
- CO = College Accelerator Programme entrant
- NG = Next Gen Accelerator Program entrant
- w/o = Walkover
- r = Retired
- d = Defaulted

=== Finals ===
Quarterfinals
1	(Switzerland) Martina Hingis	6	3	8
6	(United States) Serena Williams	2	6	6
3	(United States) Venus Williams	2	6	8
10	(South Africa) Amanda Coetzer	6	1	6
12	(United States) Jennifer Capriati	5	6	6
4	(United States) Monica Seles	7	4	3
8	(Russia) Anna Kournikova	4	2
2	(United States) Lindsay Davenport	6	6

Semifinals
1	(Switzerland) Martina Hingis	6	6
3	(United States) Venus Williams	1	1
12	(United States) Jennifer Capriati	6	6
2	(United States) Lindsay Davenport	3	4

Final
1	(Switzerland) Martina Hingis	4	3
12	(United States) Jennifer Capriati	6	6

=== Top half ===
==== Section 1 ====
First round
1	(Switzerland) M Hingis	6	6
(Hungary) K Marosi-Aracama	1	1
(Australia) R McQuillan	3	1
(Belgium) E Callens	6	6
(Luxembourg) A Kremer	6	2	6
(Uzbekistan) I Tulyaganova	4	6	4
(Russia) T Panova	6^{6}	3
WC	(France) V Razzano	7^{8}	6
(United States) H Parkinson	6	6
(Spain) Á Montolio	2	2
WC	(Australia) E Dominikovic	4	6	6
(Switzerland) P Schnyder	6	1	3
(Spain) G León García	2	6^{2}
(Italy) R Grande	6	7^{7}
Q	(France) L Andretto	5	4
16	(United States) A Frazier	7	6

Second round
1	(Switzerland) M Hingis	6	6
(Belgium) E Callens	1	0
(Luxembourg) A Kremer	7^{7}	1	5
WC	(France) V Razzano	6^{1}	6	7
(United States) H Parkinson	4	6	2
WC	(Australia) E Dominikovic	6	2	6
(Italy) R Grande	6	6
16	(United States) A Frazier	4	1

Third round
1	(Switzerland) M Hingis	7	6
WC	(France) V Razzano	5	1
WC	(Australia) E Dominikovic	3	4
(Italy) R Grande	6	6

Fourth round
1	(Switzerland) M Hingis	6	6
(Italy) R Grande	0	3

==== Section 2 ====
First round
9	(Russia) E Dementieva	6	6
(United States) L Osterloh	4	3
(Croatia) J Kostanić	6^{3}	4
Q	(Germany) A Glass	7^{7}	6
(Spain) A Medina Garrigues	7	6
(United States) J Hopkins	5	0
(Czech Republic) D Bedáňová	7	4	7
WC	(Australia) B Stewart	5	6	5
(Bulgaria) M Maleeva	6^{2}	5
(Thailand) T Tanasugarn	7^{7}	7
(Sweden) Å Carlsson	6^{6}	6	3
(Austria) P Wartusch	7^{8}	3	6
(Russia) N Petrova	7	6
Q	(Russia) E Bovina	5	3
WC	(Chinese Taipei) J Lee	1	4
6	(United States) S Williams	6	6

Second round
9	(Russia) E Dementieva	2	7^{8}	6
Q	(Germany) A Glass	6	6^{6}	3
(Spain) A Medina Garrigues	2	6	4
(Czech Republic) D Bedáňová	6	4	6
(Thailand) T Tanasugarn	6	6
(Austria) P Wartusch	1	1
(Russia) N Petrova	3	2
6	(United States) S Williams	6	6

Third round
9	(Russia) E Dementieva	6	6^{5}	3
(Czech Republic) D Bedáňová	2	7^{7}	6
(Thailand) T Tanasugarn	1	4
6	(United States) S Williams	6	6

Fourth round
(Czech Republic) D Bedáňová	2	2
6	(United States) S Williams	6	6

==== Section 3 ====
First round
3	(United States) V Williams	6	2	6
Q	(Spain) MJ Martínez	3	6	0
(Netherlands) A Hopmans	0	4
(United States) M Shaughnessy	6	6
(Belgium) S Appelmans	7^{7}	6
(Bulgaria) P Nola	6^{5}	1
(Germany) J Kandarr	3	2
(Czech Republic) D Chládková	6	6
(Slovakia) K Habšudová	6^{3}	6	6
(Israel) A Smashnova	7^{7}	4	3
(United States) K Brandi	2	6^{7}
(Croatia) I Majoli	6	7^{9}
(Australia) N Pratt	6	6
Q	(Croatia) M Palaveršić	4	2
(Japan) A Sugiyama	3	3
13	(France) A Mauresmo	6	6

Second round
3	(United States) V Williams	6	7^{7}
(United States) M Shaughnessy	3	6^{3}
(Belgium) S Appelmans	2	2
(Czech Republic) D Chládková	6	6
(Slovakia) K Habšudová	4	2
(Croatia) I Majoli	6	6
(Australia) N Pratt	0	5
13	(France) A Mauresmo	6	7

Third round
3	(United States) V Williams	6	6
(Czech Republic) D Chládková	4	1
(Croatia) I Majoli	4	2
13	(France) A Mauresmo	6	6

Fourth round
3	(United States) V Williams	6	3	6
13	(France) A Mauresmo	2	6	3

==== Section 4 ====
First round
10	(South Africa) A Coetzer	6	6
(Canada) S Jeyaseelan	2	4
(Croatia) S Talaja	6	6
(Australia) A Molik	0	0
(Belarus) O Barabanschikova	5	2
(Slovenia) T Pisnik	7	6
(United States) L Raymond	3	4
(Germany) M Weingärtner	6	6
(France) N Dechy	2	1
(Argentina) P Suárez	6	6
(Poland) M Grzybowska	4	2
(Paraguay) R de los Ríos	6	6
(Argentina) M Díaz Oliva	6	5	6
(Czech Republic) A Gerši	4	7	4
(Austria) S Plischke	1	3
7	(France) M Pierce	6	6

Second round
10	(South Africa) A Coetzer	6	6
(Croatia) S Talaja	1	3
(Slovenia) T Pisnik	6	6^{6}	0
(Germany) M Weingärtner	4	7^{8}	6
(Argentina) P Suárez	6	6
(Paraguay) R de los Ríos	3	0
(Argentina) M Díaz Oliva	2	2
7	(France) M Pierce	6	6

Third round
10	(South Africa) A Coetzer	6	6
(Germany) M Weingärtner	2	4
(Argentina) P Suárez	6	6
7	(France) M Pierce	3	2

Fourth round
10	(South Africa) A Coetzer	6	6
(Argentina) P Suárez	1	4

=== Bottom half ===
==== Section 5 ====
First round
5	(Spain) C Martínez	6	6
WC	(Australia) C Wheeler	1	1
WC	(Australia) A Ellwood	3	6	6
(Switzerland) E Gagliardi	6	4	8
(Federal Republic of Yugoslavia) S Načuk	0	6	6
(Italy) T Garbin	6	2	2
(United States) C Morariu	6	4	4
(Spain) M Marrero	2	6	6
(United States) A Stevenson	7	6
(Bulgaria) L Bacheva	5	1
(Spain) V Ruano Pascual	6	7^{7}
Q	(United States) J Craybas	2	6^{5}
(Netherlands) M Oremans	6	6
WC	(Australia) A Grahame	3	4
(Slovakia) H Nagyová	6	2	5
12	(United States) J Capriati	4	6	7

Second round
5	(Spain) C Martínez	7	3	6
(Switzerland) E Gagliardi	5	6	8
(Federal Republic of Yugoslavia) S Načuk	4	4
(Spain) M Marrero	6	6
(United States) A Stevenson	6	5	2
(Spain) V Ruano Pascual	3	7	6
(Netherlands) M Oremans	0	2
12	(United States) J Capriati	6	6

Third round
(Switzerland) E Gagliardi	6	1	2
(Spain) M Marrero	4	6	6
(Spain) V Ruano Pascual	0	2
12	(United States) J Capriati	6	6

Fourth round
(Spain) M Marrero	5	1
12	(United States) J Capriati	7	6

==== Section 6 ====
First round
14	(France) S Testud	6	6
(Spain) M Sánchez Lorenzo	1	0
(China) J-Q Yi	6	6
(Netherlands) Y Basting	2	3
(Belgium) J Henin	6	7
(Belarus) T Poutchek	4	5
(Netherlands) K Boogert	3	3
(France) S Pitkowski	6	6
(United States) M Irvin	1	3
(Spain) M Serna	6	6
(France) É Loit	6	2	6
(Italy) G Casoni	3	6	3
(Switzerland) M Vavrinec	3	7^{7}	6
(France) A-G Sidot	6	6^{5}	4
(United States) B Rippner	0	r
4	(United States) M Seles	1

Second round
14	(France) S Testud	6	5
(China) J-Q Yi	4	2	r
(Belgium) J Henin	6	6
(France) S Pitkowski	3	2
(Spain) M Serna	5	6	1
(France) É Loit	7	3	6
(Switzerland) M Vavrinec	2	3
4	(United States) M Seles	6	6

Third round
14	(France) S Testud	2	4
(Belgium) J Henin	6	6
(France) É Loit	3	5
4	(United States) M Seles	6	7

Fourth round
(Belgium) J Henin	6	4	4
4	(United States) M Seles	4	6	6

==== Section 7 ====
First round
8	(Russia) A Kournikova	6	7
(Slovakia) D Hantuchová	2	5
(Italy) F Schiavone	6^{8}	6	4
(Hungary) R Kuti-Kis	7^{10}	1	6
(Russia) E Likhovtseva	6	6^{2}	4
(Austria) B Schett	4	7^{7}	6
(United Kingdom) L Latimer	6^{2}	2
(Venezuela) M Vento	7^{7}	6
(United States) E deLone	6	3	3
(Germany) B Rittner	2	6	6
(United States) M Tu	7	6
(Belarus) N Ostrovskaya	5	0
(Spain) C Torrens Valero	5	1
(Romania) R Dragomir	7	6
Q	(Slovakia) J Husárová	6	6
11	(United States) C Rubin	3	0

Second round
8	(Russia) A Kournikova	6	6
(Hungary) R Kuti-Kis	3	4
(Austria) B Schett	6	6
(Venezuela) M Vento	4	2
(Germany) B Rittner	6	7^{7}
(United States) M Tu	3	6^{1}
(Romania) R Dragomir	6	6^{3}	6
Q	(Slovakia) J Husárová	1	7^{7}	1

Third round
8	(Russia) A Kournikova	2	6	6
(Austria) B Schett	6	4	3
(Germany) B Rittner	6	3	6
(Romania) R Dragomir	1	6	1

Fourth round
8	(Russia) A Kournikova	6	6
(Germany) B Rittner	3	1

==== Section 8 ====
First round
15	(Belgium) K Clijsters	6	6
Q	(Germany) A Barna	3	2
(Russia) A Jidkova	7	6
Q	(Russia) L Krasnoroutskaya	5	3
Q	(Spain) N Llagostera	6	6
(South Africa) J Kruger	2	3
(Japan) S Asagoe	4	1
(Zimbabwe) C Black	6	6
(Slovakia) M Suchá	6	5	3
(Italy) S Farina Elia	4	7	6
Q	(France) A Fusai	6	5	0
WC	(Australia) M Dowse	4	7	6
Q	(Germany) G Arn	3	7^{7}	12
(Canada) J Nejedly	6	6^{4}	10
(Federal Republic of Yugoslavia) J Dokić	6	4	3
2	(United States) L Davenport	4	6	6

Second round
15	(Belgium) K Clijsters	6	7^{7}
(Russia) A Jidkova	3	6^{5}
Q	(Spain) N Llagostera	7^{7}	7
(Zimbabwe) C Black	6^{4}	5
(Italy) S Farina Elia	6	6
WC	(Australia) M Dowse	0	2
Q	(Germany) G Arn	2	6	2
2	(United States) L Davenport	6	4	6

Third round
15	(Belgium) K Clijsters	6	6
Q	(Spain) N Llagostera	0	1
(Italy) S Farina Elia	2	1
2	(United States) L Davenport	6	6

Fourth round
15	(Belgium) K Clijsters	4	0
2	(United States) L Davenport	6	6

Preceded by 2000 US Open – Women's singles	Grand Slam women's singles	Succeeded by 2001 French Open – Women's singles
