= Corina Morariu =

American tennis player (born 1978)

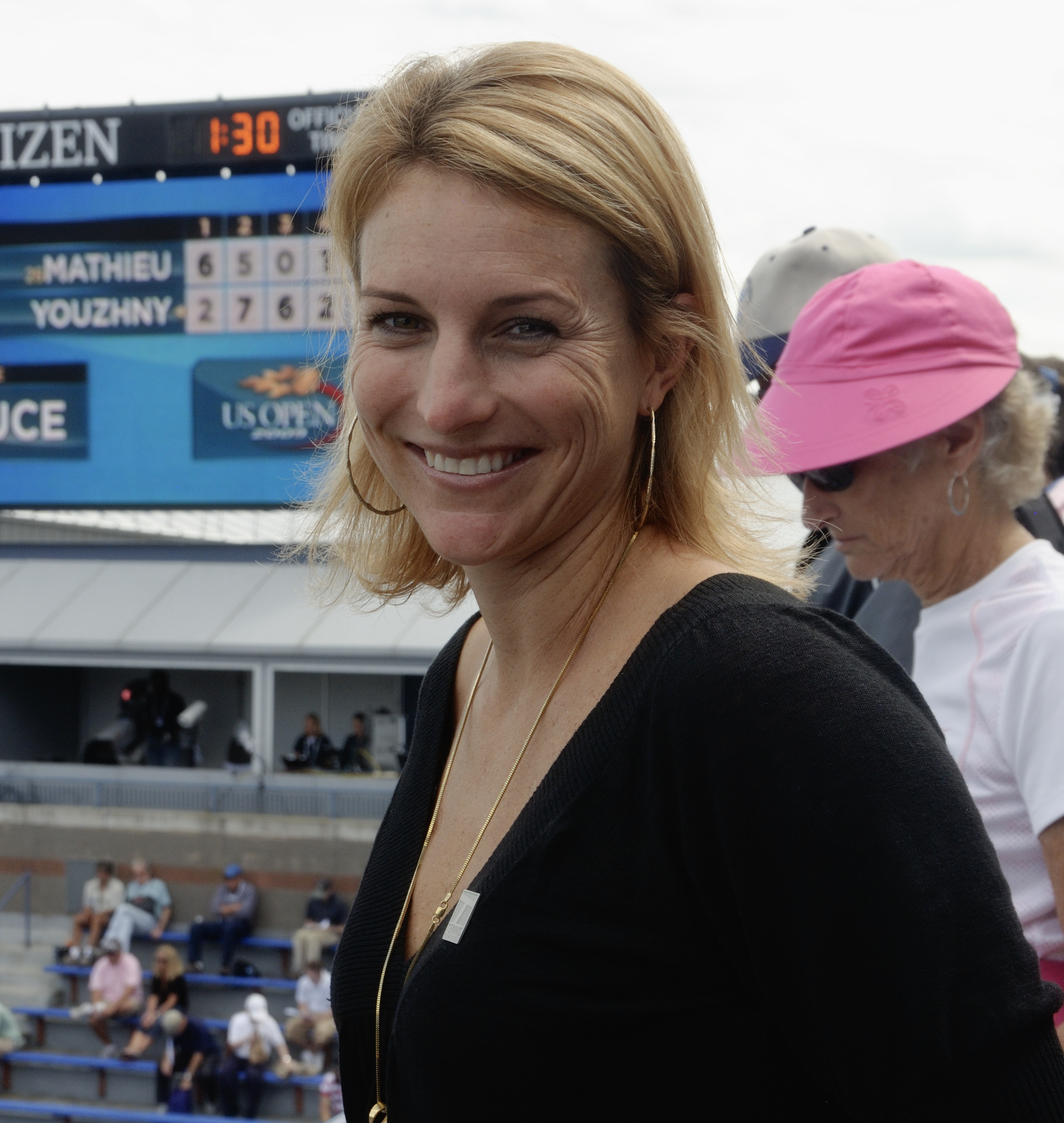
- Morariu at the 2009 US Open
- Full name: Corina Maria Morariu
- Country (sports): United States
- Residence: Boca Raton, Florida, U.S.
- Born: January 26, 1978 (age 48) Detroit, Michigan, U.S.
- Turned pro: 1994
- Retired: 2007
- Plays: Right (one-handed backhand)
- Prize money: $1,733,916

Singles
- Career record: 160–134
- Career titles: 1 WTA, 5 ITF
- Highest ranking: No. 29 (August 24, 1998)

Grand Slam singles results
- Australian Open: 2R (1998)
- French Open: 2R (1998, 2000, 2003)
- Wimbledon: 3R (1998, 1999)
- US Open: 2R (1997)

Doubles
- Career record: 248–158
- Career titles: 13 WTA, 9 ITF
- Highest ranking: No. 1 (April 3, 2000)

Grand Slam doubles results
- Australian Open: F (2001, 2005)
- French Open: SF (2005)
- Wimbledon: W (1999)
- US Open: QF (1999, 2002, 2005, 2007)

Mixed doubles
- Career record: 21–22
- Career titles: 1

Grand Slam mixed doubles results
- Australian Open: W (2001)
- French Open: QF (2003, 2005)
- Wimbledon: 3R (2006)
- US Open: SF (2002, 2005)

Corina Maria Morariu (born January 26, 1978) is an American former professional tennis player.

Morariu (pronounced: mo-RA-R'ju) was born in Detroit, Michigan and is of Romanian descent. She turned professional in 1994. Mainly known as a doubles specialist, she won the women's doubles title at Wimbledon in 1999 with Lindsay Davenport. She also won the mixed-doubles title at the 2001 Australian Open with Ellis Ferreira. She reached the Australian Open women's doubles final with Davenport in 2001 and 2005. She also reached the world No. 1 ranking in doubles in 2000.

In 2001, Morariu was diagnosed with leukemia and began a program of chemotherapy. During this time, Jennifer Capriati dedicated her 2001 French Open victory to Morariu. After recovering from cancer, along with shoulder surgery, Morariu was largely restricted to doubles play. The WTA then created the Corina Comeback Award, which was presented to Morariu by Capriati.

Morariu retired from the tour in 2007. She is an International Sports Ambassador for The Leukemia and Lymphoma Society, and has released a memoir titled Living Through the Racket: How I Survived Leukemia...and Rediscovered My Self. Following her retirement, she began working as a commentator for Tennis Channel.

== Grand Slam finals ==
=== Doubles: 3 (1 title, 2 runner-ups) ===
Result	Year	Championship	Surface	Partner	Opponents	Score
Win	1999	Wimbledon	Grass	(United States) Lindsay Davenport	(South Africa) Mariaan de Swardt (Ukraine) Elena Tatarkova	6–4, 6–4
Loss	2001	Australian Open	Hard	(United States) Lindsay Davenport	(United States) Serena Williams (United States) Venus Williams	2–6, 6–2, 4–6
Loss	2005	Australian Open	Hard	(United States) Lindsay Davenport	(Russia) Svetlana Kuznetsova (Australia) Alicia Molik	3–6, 4–6

=== Mixed doubles: 1 (title) ===
Result	Year	Championship	Surface	Partner	Opponents	Score
Win	2001	Australian Open	Hard	(South Africa) Ellis Ferreira	(Austria) Barbara Schett (Australia) Joshua Eagle	6–1, 6–3

== WTA Tour finals ==
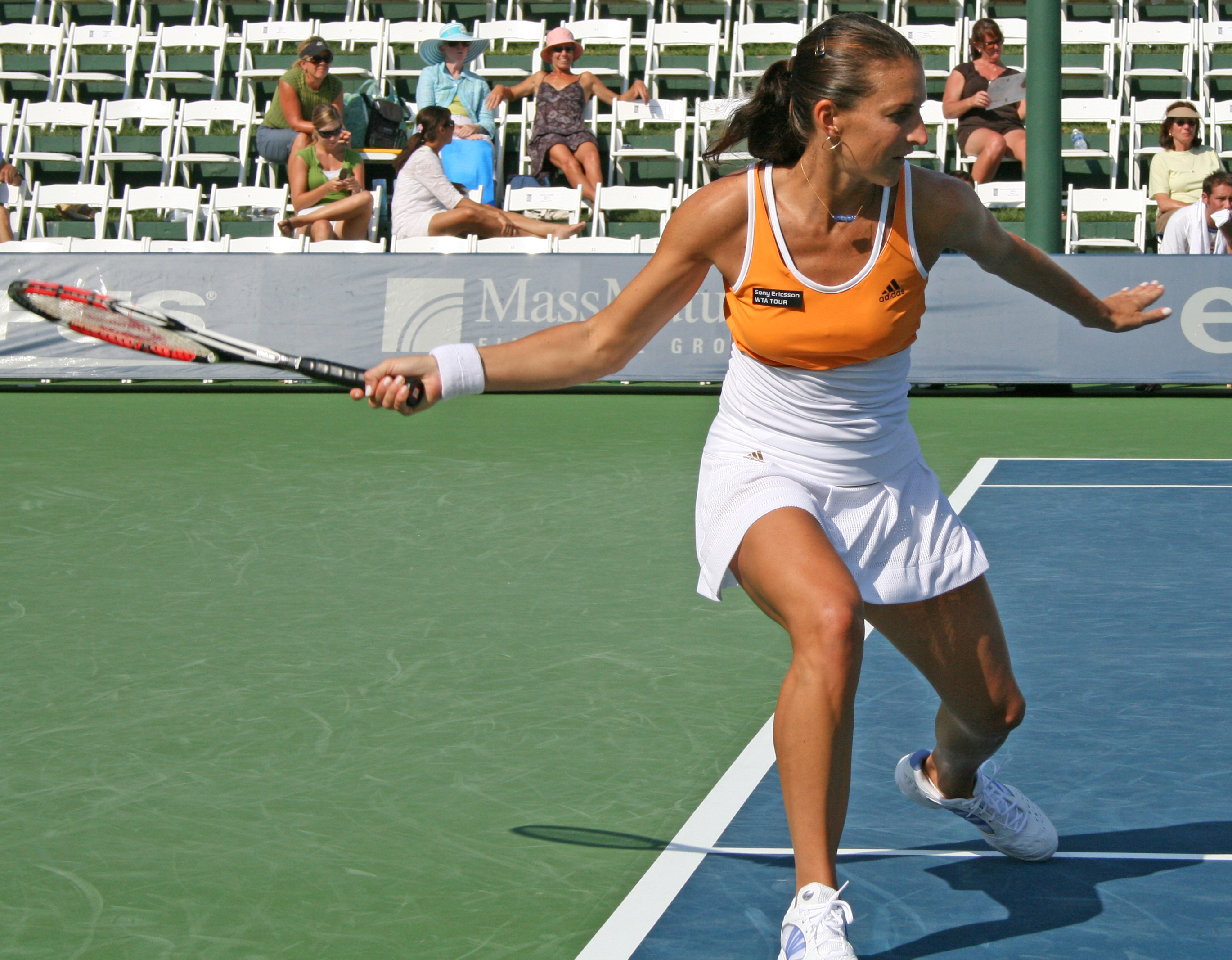
Corina Morariu hitting a forehand

=== Singles: 4 (1–3) ===
Legend
Tier I (0–0)
Tier II (0–0)
Tier III (0–1)
Tier IV (1–2)

Result	W/L	Date	Tournament	Surface	Opponent	Score
Loss	0–1	May 1997	Bol Ladies Open, Croatia	Clay	(Croatia) Mirjana Lučić	5–7, 7–6^{(9–7)}, 6–7^{(5–7)}
Loss	0–2	Apr 1998	Japan Open, Tokyo	Hard	(Japan) Ai Sugiyama	3–6, 3–6
Loss	0–3	May 1998	Bol Ladies Open, Croatia	Clay	(Croatia) Mirjana Lučić	2–6, 4–6
Win	1–3	May 1999	Bol Ladies Open, Croatia	Clay	(France) Julie Halard-Decugis	6–2, 6–0

=== Doubles: 20 (13–7) ===
Legend
Grand Slam (1–2)
Tier I (1–2)
Tier II (3–2)
Tier III (7–1)
Tier IV (1–0)

Result	No.	Date	Tournament	Surface	Partner	Opponents	Score
Loss	1.	Apr 1997	Japan Open, Tokyo	Hard	(Australia) Kerry-Anne Guse	(France) Alexia Dechaume-Balleret (Japan) Rika Hiraki	4–6, 2–6
Win	1.	Nov 1997	Pattaya Open, Thailand	Hard	(Australia) Kristine Kunce	(Argentina) Florencia Labat (Belgium) Dominique Monami	6–3, 6–4
Win	2.	Jan 1999	Brisbane International, Australia	Hard	(Latvia) Larisa Neiland	(Australia) Kristine Kunce (Romania) Irina Spîrlea	6–3, 6–4
Win	3.	Apr 1999	Japan Open, Tokyo	Hard	(United States) Kimberly Po	(Australia) Kerry-Anne Guse (Australia) Catherine Barclay	6–3, 6–2
Win	4.	Jun 1999	Birmingham Classic, UK	Grass	(Latvia) Larisa Neiland	(Argentina) Inés Gorrochategui (France) Alexandra Fusai	6–4, 6–4
Win	5.	Jul 1999	Wimbledon Championships, UK	Grass	(United States) Lindsay Davenport	(South Africa) Mariaan de Swardt (Ukraine) Elena Tatarkova	6–4, 6–4
Win	6.	Jul 1999	Stanford Classic, U.S.	Hard	(United States) Lindsay Davenport	(Russia) Anna Kournikova (Russia) Elena Likhovtseva	6–4, 6–4
Win	7.	Aug 1999	San Diego Open, U.S.	Hard	(United States) Lindsay Davenport	(United States) Venus Williams (United States) Serena Williams	6–4, 6–1
Win	8.	Feb 2000	Cellular South Cup, U.S.	Hard (i)	(United States) Kimberly Po	(Thailand) Tamarine Tanasugarn (Ukraine) Elena Tatarkova	6–4, 4–6, 6–2
Win	9.	Mar 2000	Indian Wells Open, U.S.	Hard	(United States) Lindsay Davenport	(Russia) Anna Kournikova (Belarus) Natasha Zvereva	6–2, 6–3
Win	10.	May 2000	Bol Ladies Open, Croatia	Clay	(France) Julie Halard-Decugis	(Slovenia) Katarina Srebotnik (Slovenia) Tina Križan	6–2, 6–2
Loss	2.	May 2000	German Open, Berlin	Clay	(South Africa) Amanda Coetzer	(Spain) Arantxa Sánchez Vicario (Spain) Conchita Martínez	6–3, 2–6, 6–7^{(7–9)}
Win	11.	Oct 2000	Japan Open, Tokyo	Hard	(France) Julie Halard-Decugis	(Slovenia) Tina Križan (Slovenia) Katarina Srebotnik	6–1, 6–2
Loss	3.	Jan 2001	Australian Open, Melbourne	Hard	(United States) Lindsay Davenport	(United States) Serena Williams (United States) Venus Williams	2–6, 6–2, 4–6
Loss	4.	Nov 2004	Philadelphia Championships, U.S.	Hard (i)	(South Africa) Liezel Huber	(United States) Lisa Raymond (Australia) Alicia Molik	5–7, 4–6
Loss	5.	Jan 2005	Australian Open, Melbourne	Hard	(United States) Lindsay Davenport	(Russia) Svetlana Kuznetsova (Australia) Alicia Molik	3–6, 4–6
Loss	6.	Feb 2005	Pan Pacific Open, Tokyo	Carpet (i)	(United States) Lindsay Davenport	(Slovakia) Janette Husárová (Russia) Elena Likhovtseva	4–6, 3–6
Win	12.	Jan 2006	Sydney International, Australia	Hard	(Australia) Rennae Stubbs	(Argentina) Paola Suárez (Spain) Virginia Ruano Pascual	6–3, 5–7, 6–2
Win	13.	Sep 2006	Bali Classic, Indonesia	Hard	(United States) Lindsay Davenport	(South Africa) Natalie Grandin (Australia) Trudi Musgrave	6–3, 6–4
Loss	7.	Oct 2006	Ladies Linz, Austria	Hard (i)	(Slovenia) Katarina Srebotnik	(United States) Lisa Raymond (Australia) Samantha Stosur	3–6, 0–6

== ITF Circuit finals ==
$100,000 tournaments
$75,000 tournaments
$50,000 tournaments
$25,000 tournaments
$10,000 tournaments

=== Singles (5–0) ===
Result	No.	Date	Location	Surface	Opponent	Score
Win	1.	22 August 1994	Nicolosi, Italy	Hard	(Italy) Giulia Casoni	7–5, 7–6^{(5)}
Win	2.	22 May 1995	Salzburg, Austria	Clay	(Austria) Patricia Wartusch	6–2, 6–2
Win	3.	29 May 1995	Katowice, Poland	Clay	(Poland) Ewa Radzikowska	6–4, 6–2
Win	4.	21 August 1995	Sochi, Russia	Clay	(France) Anne-Gaëlle Sidot	6–4, 4–6, 6–0
Win	5.	23 February 1997	Bogotá, Colombia	Clay	(Czech Republic) Lenka Němečková	6–2, 6–3

=== Doubles (9–4) ===
Result	No.	Date	Location	Surface	Partner	Opponents	Score
Loss	1.	July 17, 1994	Olsztyn, Poland	Clay	(Slovakia) Henrieta Nagyová	(Netherlands) Marielle Bruens (Netherlands) Amanda Hopmans	4–6, 7–5, 5–7
Win	2.	August 22, 1994	Nicolosi, Italy	Hard	(Australia) Loretta Sheales	(Australia) Natalie Frawley (Australia) Jenny Anne Fetch	6–1, 7–5
Win	3.	January 30, 1995	İstanbul, Turkey	Hard	(Greece) Christina Zachariadou	(Bulgaria) Dora Djilianova (Bulgaria) Desislava Topalova	6–3, 7–5
Loss	4.	April 3, 1995	Athens, Greece	Clay	(Greece) Christina Zachariadou	(Czech Republic) Denisa Chládková (Slovakia) Patrícia Marková	2–6, 5–7
Win	5.	May 22, 1995	Salzburg, Austria	Clay	(Australia) Aarthi Venkatesan	(Slovenia) Tjaša Jezernik (North Macedonia) Marina Lazarovska	w/o
Win	6.	August 14, 1995	Carthage, Tunisia	Clay	(Greece) Christina Zachariadou	(Czech Republic) Denisa Chládková (Belgium) Daphne van de Zande	6–4, 7–6^{(7)}
Win	7.	August 27, 1995	Sochi, Russia	Hard	(Ukraine) Elena Tatarkova	(Russia) Natalia Egorova (Finland) Petra Thorén	6–3, 7–5
Loss	8.	August 28, 1995	Athens, Greece	Clay	(Greece) Christina Zachariadou	(Poland) Magdalena Grzybowska (Slovakia) Henrieta Nagyová	w/o
Win	9.	December 4, 1995	Cergy, France	Hard (i)	(United States) Angela Lettiere	(Madagascar) Dally Randriantefy (Madagascar) Natacha Randriantefy	6–3, 7–5
Win	10.	January 27, 1996	Mission, United States	Hard	(United States) Angela Lettiere	(United States) Shannan McCarthy (United States) Julie Steven	7–6^{(7)}, 6–2
Win	11.	February 17, 1996	Midland, United States	Hard (i)	(United States) Angela Lettiere	(United States) Katrina Adams (United States) Debbie Graham	7–6^{(4)}, 7–6^{(6)}
Loss	12.	May 19, 1996	Athens, Greece	Clay	(United States) Angela Lettiere	(South Africa) Liezel Horn (Greece) Christína Papadáki	5–7, 2–6
Win	13.	October 12, 1997	Sedona, United States	Hard	(Romania) Cătălina Cristea	(South Africa) Liezel Horn (Argentina) Paola Suárez	7–5, 6–2

== Doubles performance timeline ==
Key
W	F	SF	QF	#R	RR	Q#	DNQ	A	NH

(W) winner; (F) finalist; (SF) semifinalist; (QF) quarterfinalist; (#R) rounds 4, 3, 2, 1; (RR) round-robin stage; (Q#) qualification round; (DNQ) did not qualify; (A) absent; (NH) not held; (SR) strike rate (events won / competed); (W–L) win–loss record.

Tournament	1995	1996	1997	1998	1999	2000	2001	2002	2003	2004	2005	2006	2007	SR	W–L
Grand Slam tournaments
Australian Open	A	A	2R	2R	2R	SF	F	A	A	3R	F	1R	1R	0 / 9	19–9
French Open	A	1R	1R	3R	2R	A	A	A	1R	A	SF	A	1R	0 / 7	7–7
Wimbledon	A	1R	2R	2R	W	A	A	A	1R	A	2R	A	1R	1 / 7	9–6
US Open	A	3R	1R	1R	QF	A	A	QF	1R	2R	QF	2R	QF	0 / 10	16–10
Win–loss	0–0	2–3	2–4	4–4	11–3	4–1	5–1	3–1	0–3	3–2	13–4	1–2	3–4	1 / 33	51–32
Year-end championships
Tour Championships	A	A	A	A	SF	A	A	A	A	A	A	A	A	0 / 1	1–1
Year-end ranking
Ranking	187	81	66	49	6	14	57	78	156	24	15	34	76		

== Awards ==
- The Corina Comeback Award (established by the WTA and named after her; she was the first recipient)
- The 2002 WTA Tour Comeback Player of the Year Award

== Publications ==
- Morariu, Corina (2010). Living through the Racket: How I Survived Leukemia…and Rediscovered My Self. Hay House Publishing. ISBN 978-1-4019-2649-6.
