= 2001 Australian Open – Mixed doubles =

Mixed doubles
- 2001 Australian Open

Final
- Champions: (United States) Corina Morariu (South Africa) Ellis Ferreira
- Runners-up: (Austria) Barbara Schett (Australia) Joshua Eagle
- Score: 6–1, 6–3
- Date: 26 January 2001

Details
- Draw: 32
- Seeds: 8

Events
Singles	men	women		boys	girls
Doubles	men	women	mixed	boys	girls
WC Singles	men	women	quad
WC Doubles	men	women	quad
Legends	men	women	mixed
- Australian Open

Rennae Stubbs and Jared Palmer were the defending champions but only Stubbs competed that year with Todd Woodbridge.

Stubbs and Woodbridge lost in the semifinals to Barbara Schett and Joshua Eagle.

Corina Morariu and Ellis Ferreira won in the final 6–1, 6–3 against Schett and Eagle.

This was the first Australian Open to replace the final tie-break set for a super tie-break or a "champions tie-break" to define the match in the mixed doubles category.

== Seeds ==
Champion seeds are indicated in bold text while text in italics indicates the round in which those seeds were eliminated.

1. (Australia) Rennae Stubbs / (Australia) Todd Woodbridge (semifinals)
2. (Russia) Anna Kournikova / (Belarus) Max Mirnyi (first round)
3. (United States) **Corina Morariu** / (South Africa) **Ellis Ferreira (champions)**
4. (Austria) Barbara Schett / (Australia) Joshua Eagle (final)
5. (Argentina) Paola Suárez / (Argentina) Martín García (first round)
6. n/a
7. (Japan) Ai Sugiyama / (India) Mahesh Bhupathi (second round)
8. (Sweden) Åsa Carlsson / (Sweden) Nicklas Kulti (first round)

== Draw ==
Key

- Q = Qualifier
- WC = Wild card
- LL = Lucky loser
- Alt = Alternate
- ITF = ITF entry
- PR = Protected ranking
- SR = Special ranking
- SE = Special exempt
- JE = Junior exempt
- JR = Junior Accelerator Programme entrant
- CO = College Accelerator Programme entrant
- NG = Next Gen Accelerator Program entrant
- w/o = Walkover
- r = Retired
- d = Defaulted

=== Final ===
Final
4	(Austria) Barbara Schett (Australia) Joshua Eagle	1	3
3	(United States) **Corina Morariu** (South Africa) **Ellis Ferreira**	**6**	**6**

=== Top half ===
First round
1	(Australia) **R Stubbs** (Australia) **T Woodbridge**	**6**	**6**
(Slovenia) K Srebotnik (South Africa) P Norval	2	1
(France) A-G Sidot (United States) S Humphries	4	6^{4}
(Australia) **A Molik** (Australia) **S Stolle**	**6**	**7^{7}**
(Australia) **R McQuillan** (Australia) **P Tramacchi**	4	**7**	**[10]**
(France) A Fusai (Belgium) T Vanhoudt	**6**	5	[4]
(Slovakia) K Habšudová (Czech Republic) D Rikl	5	6^{9}
7	(Japan) **A Sugiyama** (India) **M Bhupathi**	**7**	**7^{11}**
4	(Austria) **B Schett** (Australia) **J Eagle**	**6**	**6**
WC	(Germany) M Weingärtner (Australia) A Ilie	2	2
(Russia) E Likhovtseva (United States) J Tarango	4	**6**	[5]
WC	(Australia) **A Ellwood** (Australia) **W Arthurs**	**6**	2	**[10]**
(United States) **N Arendt** (The Bahamas) **M Knowles**	**6**	**6**
(South Africa) L Horn (Australia) A Kratzmann	2	2
WC	(Australia) **L McShea** (Australia) **S Draper**	**6**	**7^{12}**
8	(Sweden) Å Carlsson (Sweden) N Kulti	3	6^{10}

Second round
1	(Australia) **R Stubbs** (Australia) **T Woodbridge**	**6**	**6**
(Australia) A Molik (Australia) S Stolle	4	2
(Australia) **R McQuillan** (Australia) **P Tramacchi**	**7^{7}**	**7^{8}**
7	(Japan) A Sugiyama (India) M Bhupathi	6^{3}	6^{6}
4	(Austria) **B Schett** (Australia) **J Eagle**	**6**	**6**
WC	(Australia) A Ellwood (Australia) W Arthurs	3	4
(United States) **N Arendt** (The Bahamas) **M Knowles**	**7^{7}**	**6**
WC	(Australia) L McShea (Australia) S Draper	6^{3}	3

Quarterfinals
1	(Australia) **R Stubbs** (Australia) **T Woodbridge**	**6**	**6**
(Australia) R McQuillan (Australia) P Tramacchi	4	2
4	(Austria) **B Schett** (Australia) **J Eagle**	**6**	5	**[10]**
(United States) N Arendt (The Bahamas) M Knowles	3	**7**	[5]

Semifinals
1	(Australia) R Stubbs (Australia) T Woodbridge	2	6^{5}
4	(Austria) **B Schett** (Australia) **J Eagle**	**6**	**7^{7}**

=== Bottom half ===
First round
5	(Argentina) P Suárez (Argentina) M García	4	**7^{7}**	[10]
(Federal Republic of Yugoslavia) **J Dokić** (Federal Republic of Yugoslavia) **N Zimonjić**	**6**	6^{5}	**[12]**
(Zimbabwe) **C Black** (Zimbabwe) **K Ullyett**	6^{6}	**6**	**[10]**
(Slovenia) T Križan (Argentina) L Arnold	**7^{8}**	4	[2]
(United States) **L Raymond** (India) **L Paes**	**6**	**6**
WC	(Australia) B Stewart (Australia) T Perry	4	1
(Spain) V Ruano Pascual (Argentina) D Orsanic	2	1
3	(United States) **C Morariu** (South Africa) **E Ferreira**	**6**	**6**
Alt	(Australia) L Pleming (Australia) A Fisher	4	1
(Belgium) **E Callens** (South Africa) **C Haggard**	**6**	**6**
(Kazakhstan) I Selyutina (Australia) M Hill	3	**7**	[4]
WC	(Australia) **C Wheeler** (Australia) **P Hanley**	**6**	5	**[10]**
(Australia) N Pratt (Australia) A Florent	3	**6**	[6]
(United States) **M Shaughnessy** (South Africa) **R Koenig**	**6**	3	**[10]**
(South Africa) **A Coetzer** (South Africa) **D Adams**	**6**	**6**
2	(Russia) A Kournikova (Belarus) M Mirnyi	3	3

Second round
(Federal Republic of Yugoslavia) **J Dokić** (Federal Republic of Yugoslavia) **N Zimonjić**	**6**	1	**[10]**
(Zimbabwe) C Black (Zimbabwe) K Ullyett	3	**6**	[5]
(United States) L Raymond (India) L Paes	5	6^{3}
3	(United States) **C Morariu** (South Africa) **E Ferreira**	**7**	**7^{7}**
(Belgium) **E Callens** (South Africa) **C Haggard**	**6**	**6**
WC	(Australia) C Wheeler (Australia) P Hanley	1	2
(United States) **M Shaughnessy** (South Africa) **R Koenig**	**6**	**6**
(South Africa) A Coetzer (South Africa) D Adams	3	4

Quarterfinals
(Federal Republic of Yugoslavia) J Dokić (Federal Republic of Yugoslavia) N Zimonjić
3	(United States) **C Morariu** (South Africa) **E Ferreira**	w/o
(Belgium) E Callens (South Africa) C Haggard	6^{3}	**6**	[4]
(United States) **M Shaughnessy** (South Africa) **R Koenig**	**7^{7}**	4	**[10]**

Semifinals
3	(United States) **C Morariu** (South Africa) **E Ferreira**	**6**	**7**
(United States) M Shaughnessy (South Africa) R Koenig	4	5
