= 2001 Australian Open =

- Date: 15–28 January 2001
- Edition: 89th
- Category: Grand Slam (ITF)
- Surface: Hardcourt (Rebound Ace)
- Location: Melbourne, Australia
- Venue: Melbourne Park

Champions

Men's singles
- (United States) Andre Agassi

Women's singles
- (United States) Jennifer Capriati

Men's doubles
- (Sweden) Jonas Björkman / (Australia) Todd Woodbridge

Women's doubles
- (United States) Serena Williams / (United States) Venus Williams

Mixed doubles
- (United States) Corina Morariu / (South Africa) Ellis Ferreira

Boys' singles
- (Federal Republic of Yugoslavia) Janko Tipsarević

Girls' singles
- (Federal Republic of Yugoslavia) Jelena Janković

Boys' doubles
- (United States) Ytai Abougzir / (Argentina) Luciano Vitullo

Girls' doubles
- (Czech Republic) Petra Cetkovská / (Czech Republic) Barbora Strýcová

Men's legends doubles
- (Australia) John Fitzgerald / (Australia) Wally Masur

Legends mixed doubles
- (Australia) Nicole Bradtke / (Australia) Tony Roche
- Australian Open

The 2001 Australian Open was a tennis tournament played on outdoor hard courts at Melbourne Park in Melbourne in Australia. It was the 89th edition of the Australian Open and was held from 15 through 28 January 2001.

== Seniors ==
=== Men's singles ===
(United States) Andre Agassi defeated (France) Arnaud Clément 6–4, 6–2, 6–2

- It was Agassi's 7th career Grand Slam title and his 3rd Australian Open title.

=== Women's singles ===
(United States) Jennifer Capriati defeated (Switzerland) Martina Hingis 6–4, 6–3

- It was Capriati's 1st career Grand Slam title and her 1st Australian Open title.

=== Men's doubles ===
(Sweden) Jonas Björkman / (Australia) Todd Woodbridge defeated (Zimbabwe) Byron Black / (Germany) David Prinosil 6–1, 5–7, 6–4, 6–4

- It was Björkman's 3rd career Grand Slam title and his 3rd Australian Open title. It was Woodbridge's 18th career Grand Slam title and his 4th Australian Open title.

=== Women's doubles ===
(United States) Serena Williams / (United States) Venus Williams defeated (United States) Lindsay Davenport / (United States) Corina Morariu 6–2, 2–6, 6–4

- It was Serena Williams's 7th career Grand Slam title and her 1st Australian Open title. It was Venus Williams's 8th career Grand Slam title and her 2nd Australian Open title.

=== Mixed doubles ===
(United States) Corina Morariu / (South Africa) Ellis Ferreira defeated (Austria) Barbara Schett / (Australia) Joshua Eagle 6–1, 6–3

- It was Morariu's 2nd and last career Grand Slam title and her only Australian Open title. It was Ferreira's 2nd and last career Grand Slam title and his 2nd Australian Open title.

== Juniors ==
=== Boys' singles ===
(Federal Republic of Yugoslavia) Janko Tipsarević defeated (Chinese Taipei) Wang Yeu-tzuoo 3–6, 7–5, 6–0

=== Girls' singles ===
(Federal Republic of Yugoslavia) Jelena Janković defeated (Sweden) Sofia Arvidsson 6–2, 6–1

=== Boys' doubles ===
(United States) Ytai Abougzir / (Argentina) Luciano Vitullo defeated (Canada) Frank Dancevic / (Ecuador) Giovanni Lapentti 6–4, 7–6 (7–5)

=== Girls' doubles ===
(Czech Republic) Petra Cetkovská / (Czech Republic) Barbora Strýcová defeated (Russia) Anna Bastrikova / (Russia) Svetlana Kuznetsova 7–6 (7–3), 1–6, 6–4

== Legends ==
=== Men's doubles ===
- (Australia) John Fitzgerald / (Australia) Wally Masur defeated (Australia) Darren Cahill / (Australia) Brad Drewett, 6–2, 6–4,

=== Mixed doubles ===
- (Australia) Nicole Bradtke / (Australia) Tony Roche defeated (Australia) Elizabeth Smylie / (United States) Stan Smith, 2–6, 6–2, 7–5

== Seeds ==
=== Men's singles ===
1. (Brazil) Gustavo Kuerten (second round, lost to Greg Rusedski)
2. (Russia) Marat Safin (fourth round, lost to Dominik Hrbatý)
3. (United States) Pete Sampras (fourth round, lost to Todd Martin)
4. (Russia) Yevgeny Kafelnikov (quarterfinals, lost to Arnaud Clément)
5. (Sweden) Magnus Norman (fourth round, lost to Sébastien Grosjean)
6. (United States) Andre Agassi (champion)
7. (Australia) Lleyton Hewitt (third round, lost to Carlos Moyá)
8. (United Kingdom) Tim Henman (fourth round, lost to Patrick Rafter)
9. (Spain) Juan Carlos Ferrero (second round, lost to Andrew Ilie)
10. (South Africa) Wayne Ferreira (third round, lost to Andreas Vinciguerra)
11. (Argentina) Franco Squillari (second round, lost to Daniel Nestor)
12. (Australia) Patrick Rafter (semifinals, lost to Andre Agassi)
13. (France) Cédric Pioline (third round, lost to Todd Martin)
14. (Slovakia) Dominik Hrbatý (quarterfinals, lost to Patrick Rafter)
15. (France) Arnaud Clément (final, lost to Andre Agassi)
16. (France) Sébastien Grosjean (semifinal, lost to Arnaud Clément)

=== Women's singles ===
1. (Switzerland) Martina Hingis (final, lost to Jennifer Capriati)
2. (United States) Lindsay Davenport (semifinals, lost to Jennifer Capriati)
3. (United States) Venus Williams (semifinals, lost to Martina Hingis)
4. (United States) Monica Seles (quarterfinals, lost to Jennifer Capriati)
5. (Spain) Conchita Martínez (second round, lost to Emmanuelle Gagliardi)
6. (United States) Serena Williams (quarterfinals, lost to Martina Hingis)
7. (France) Mary Pierce (third round, lost to Paola Suárez)
8. (Russia) Anna Kournikova (quarterfinals, lost to Lindsay Davenport)
9. (Russia) Elena Dementieva (third round, lost to Dája Bedáňová)
10. (South Africa) Amanda Coetzer (quarterfinals, lost to Venus Williams)
11. (United States) Chanda Rubin (first round, lost to Janette Husárová)
12. (United States) Jennifer Capriati (champion)
13. (France) Amélie Mauresmo (fourth round, lost to Venus Williams)
14. (France) Sandrine Testud (third round, lost to Justine Henin)
15. (Belgium) Kim Clijsters (fourth round, lost to Lindsay Davenport)
16. (United States) Amy Frazier (second round, lost to Rita Grande)

Preceded by 2000 US Open (tennis)	Grand Slams	Succeeded by 2001 French Open
