= 2001 Australian Open – Men's doubles =

Tennis tournament

Men's doubles
- 2001 Australian Open

Final
- Champion: (Sweden) Jonas Björkman (Australia) Todd Woodbridge
- Runner-up: (Zimbabwe) Byron Black (Germany) David Prinosil
- Score: 6–1, 5–7, 6–4, 6–4
- Date: 27 January 2001

Details
- Draw: 64
- Seeds: 16

Events
Singles	men	women		boys	girls
Doubles	men	women	mixed	boys	girls
WC Singles	men	women	quad
WC Doubles	men	women	quad
Legends	men	women	mixed
- Australian Open

Ellis Ferreira and Rick Leach were the defending champions, but Leach did not participate. Ferreira paired with David Rikl but lost in the second round to Arnaud Clément and Sébastien Grosjean.

Jonas Björkman and Todd Woodbridge won the title, defeating Byron Black and David Prinosil 6–1, 5–7, 6–4, 6–4 in the final. It was Woodbridge's 12th Grand Slam men's doubles title and his first with a partner other than his former partner Mark Woodforde, who retired after the 2000 season.

== Seeds ==
1. (Canada) Daniel Nestor / (Australia) Sandon Stolle (quarterfinals)
2. (South Africa) Ellis Ferreira / (Czech Republic) David Rikl (second round)
3. (South Africa) Wayne Ferreira / (Russia) Yevgeny Kafelnikov (third round)
4. (Sweden) Jonas Björkman / (Australia) Todd Woodbridge (champions)
5. (Canada) Sébastien Lareau / (United States) Alex O'Brien (third round)
6. (Sweden) Nicklas Kulti / (Belarus) Max Mirnyi (second round)
7. (United States) Donald Johnson / (South Africa) Piet Norval (first round)
8. (Switzerland) Roger Federer / (Slovakia) Dominik Hrbatý (first round)
9. (South Africa) David Adams / (Argentina) Martín García (third round)
10. (Australia) Joshua Eagle / (Australia) Andrew Florent (quarterfinals)
11. (Australia) Wayne Arthurs / (Federal Republic of Yugoslavia) Nenad Zimonjić (semifinals)
12. (Zimbabwe) Wayne Black / (Zimbabwe) Kevin Ullyett (quarterfinals)
13. (Australia) Michael Hill / (United States) Jeff Tarango (third round)
14. (Zimbabwe) Byron Black / (Germany) David Prinosil (final)
15. (United States) Justin Gimelstob / (United States) Scott Humphries (semifinals)
16. (Sweden) Simon Aspelin / (South Africa) Robbie Koenig (first round)

== Draw ==
Key

- Q = Qualifier
- WC = Wild card
- LL = Lucky loser
- Alt = Alternate
- ITF = ITF entry
- PR = Protected ranking
- SR = Special ranking
- SE = Special exempt
- JE = Junior exempt
- JR = Junior Accelerator Programme entrant
- CO = College Accelerator Programme entrant
- NG = Next Gen Accelerator Program entrant
- w/o = Walkover
- r = Retired
- d = Defaulted

=== Finals ===
Quarterfinals
1	(Canada) Daniel Nestor (Australia) Sandon Stolle	6	6^{5}	4
11	(Australia) Wayne Arthurs (Federal Republic of Yugoslavia) Nenad Zimonjić	4	7^{7}	6
4	(Sweden) Jonas Björkman (Australia) Todd Woodbridge	6	7^{7}
10	(Australia) Joshua Eagle (Australia) Andrew Florent	4	6^{3}
WC	(Ecuador) Nicolás Lapentti (Spain) Carlos Moyá
15	(United States) Justin Gimelstob (United States) Scott Humphries	w/o
12	(Zimbabwe) Wayne Black (Zimbabwe) Kevin Ullyett	3	4
14	(Zimbabwe) Byron Black (Germany) David Prinosil	6	6

Semifinals
11	(Australia) Wayne Arthurs (Federal Republic of Yugoslavia) Nenad Zimonjić	6	0	2
4	(Sweden) Jonas Björkman (Australia) Todd Woodbridge	4	6	6
15	(United States) Justin Gimelstob (United States) Scott Humphries	6^{2}	1
14	(Zimbabwe) Byron Black (Germany) David Prinosil	7^{7}	6

Final
4	(Sweden) Jonas Björkman (Australia) Todd Woodbridge	6	5	6	6
14	(Zimbabwe) Byron Black (Germany) David Prinosil	1	7	4	4

=== Top half ===
==== Section 1 ====
First round
1	(Canada) D Nestor (Australia) S Stolle	6	7^{7}
(United States) D Bowen (United States) B Coupe	3	6^{3}
(Spain) A Martín (Israel) E Ran	4	6	6
(Australia) P Kilderry (Australia) P Tramacchi	6	0	3
(Spain) Á López Morón (Spain) A Portas	6	6
WC	(Australia) M Breen (Australia) L Pearson	4	4
(South Africa) P Rosner (South Africa) J Weir-Smith	4	5
13	(Australia) M Hill (United States) J Tarango	6	7
11	(Australia) W Arthurs (Federal Republic of Yugoslavia) N Zimonjić	7^{8}	6
(France) N Escudé (France) M Llodra	6^{6}	3
(South Africa) N Godwin (Philippines) E Taino	6^{4}	6	3
(Czech Republic) T Cibulec (Czech Republic) L Friedl	7^{7}	4	6
(South Africa) M Barnard (United States) J Thomas	3	6^{6}
(Germany) K Braasch (Germany) J Knippschild	6	7^{8}
(Czech Republic) F Čermák (Czech Republic) O Fukárek	6	2	10
7	(United States) D Johnson (South Africa) P Norval	4	6	8

Second round
1	(Canada) D Nestor (Australia) S Stolle	6	6
(Spain) A Martín (Israel) E Ran	2	2
(Spain) Á López Morón (Spain) A Portas	4	6	3
13	(Australia) M Hill (United States) J Tarango	6	4	6
11	(Australia) W Arthurs (Federal Republic of Yugoslavia) N Zimonjić	4	7^{7}	6
(Czech Republic) T Cibulec (Czech Republic) L Friedl	6	6^{2}	1
(Germany) K Braasch (Germany) J Knippschild	6	6
(Czech Republic) F Čermák (Czech Republic) O Fukárek	3	2

Third round
1	(Canada) D Nestor (Australia) S Stolle	3	6	6
13	(Australia) M Hill (United States) J Tarango	6	3	2
11	(Australia) W Arthurs (Federal Republic of Yugoslavia) N Zimonjić	6	6
(Germany) K Braasch (Germany) J Knippschild	3	3

Quarterfinals
1	(Canada) D Nestor (Australia) S Stolle	6	6^{5}	4
11	(Australia) W Arthurs (Federal Republic of Yugoslavia) N Zimonjić	4	7^{7}	6

==== Section 2 ====
First round
4	(Sweden) J Björkman (Australia) T Woodbridge	6^{5}	7	6
WC	(Australia) S Huss (Australia) T Perry	7^{7}	5	2
(Spain) J Balcells (Spain) G Puentes	6^{5}	7	6
(South Africa) J Coetzee (South Africa) M Ondruska	7^{7}	5	2
(Croatia) I Ljubičić (United States) J Waite	6^{4}	7^{8}	6
(Brazil) G Kuerten (Brazil) A Prieto	7^{7}	6^{6}	3
(South Africa) C Haggard (Belgium) T Vanhoudt	6	6
16	(Sweden) S Aspelin (South Africa) R Koenig	4	3
10	(Australia) J Eagle (Australia) A Florent	7^{7}	6
(India) M Bhupathi (India) L Paes	6^{5}	4
(Argentina) D Orsanic (Czech Republic) C Suk	7	0	4
(Czech Republic) P Pála (Czech Republic) P Vízner	5	6	6
(Argentina) L Arnold Ker (Argentina) G Etlis	4	6	6
(Argentina) M Hood (Spain) J Velasco Jr.	6	1	2
(Australia) D Macpherson (South Africa) G Stafford	3	1
5	(Canada) S Lareau (United States) A O'Brien	6	6

Second round
4	(Sweden) J Björkman (Australia) T Woodbridge	4	6	6
(Spain) J Balcells (Spain) G Puentes	6	4	2
(Croatia) I Ljubičić (United States) J Waite	6^{2}	5
(South Africa) C Haggard (Belgium) T Vanhoudt	7^{7}	7
10	(Australia) J Eagle (Australia) A Florent	7	6
(Czech Republic) P Pála (Czech Republic) P Vízner	5	3
(Argentina) L Arnold Ker (Argentina) G Etlis	6	1	4
5	(Canada) S Lareau (United States) A O'Brien	3	6	6

Third round
4	(Sweden) J Björkman (Australia) T Woodbridge	6	6
(South Africa) C Haggard (Belgium) T Vanhoudt	2	3
10	(Australia) J Eagle (Australia) A Florent	5	6	6
5	(Canada) S Lareau (United States) A O'Brien	7	3	4

Quarterfinals
4	(Sweden) J Björkman (Australia) T Woodbridge	6	7^{7}
10	(Australia) J Eagle (Australia) A Florent	4	6^{3}

=== Bottom half ===
==== Section 3 ====
First round
8	(Switzerland) R Federer (Slovakia) D Hrbatý	6^{5}	3
(Japan) T Shimada (South Africa) M Wakefield	7^{7}	6
WC	(Ecuador) N Lapentti (Spain) C Moyá	6	6
(Germany) L Burgsmüller (Germany) M Kohlmann	1	4
(United States) J-M Gambill (United States) J Stark	6	6
(United States) P Goldstein (United States) C Woodruff	3	1
(Australia) T Crichton (Australia) A Fisher	6	4	4
9	(South Africa) D Adams (Argentina) M García	2	6	6
15	(United States) J Gimelstob (United States) S Humphries	4	6	6
(Sweden) T Johansson (Sweden) J Landsberg	6	3	4
WC	(Australia) S Draper (Australia) J Stoltenberg	6	6
(Netherlands) S Groen (Netherlands) J Siemerink	4	3
(Australia) P Hanley (Australia) N Healey	6	6
(Australia) A Kratzmann (Australia) M Tebbutt	2	2
(Italy) A Gaudenzi (Switzerland) M Rosset	6	6^{8}	8
3	(South Africa) W Ferreira (Russia) Y Kafelnikov	4	7^{10}	10

Second round
(Japan) T Shimada (South Africa) M Wakefield	7^{9}	4	4
WC	(Ecuador) N Lapentti (Spain) C Moyá	6^{7}	6	6
(United States) J-M Gambill (United States) J Stark	7^{7}	4	2
9	(South Africa) D Adams (Argentina) M García	6^{5}	6	6
15	(United States) J Gimelstob (United States) S Humphries	6	6
WC	(Australia) S Draper (Australia) J Stoltenberg	4	2
(Australia) P Hanley (Australia) N Healey	6	2	4
3	(South Africa) W Ferreira (Russia) Y Kafelnikov	2	6	6

Third round
WC	(Ecuador) N Lapentti (Spain) C Moyá	7^{7}	4	10
9	(South Africa) D Adams (Argentina) M García	6^{2}	6	8
15	(United States) J Gimelstob (United States) S Humphries	6	7^{7}
3	(South Africa) W Ferreira (Russia) Y Kafelnikov	2	6^{3}

Quarterfinals
WC	(Ecuador) N Lapentti (Spain) C Moyá
15	(United States) J Gimelstob (United States) S Humphries	w/o

==== Section 4 ====
First round
6	(Sweden) N Kulti (Belarus) M Mirnyi	6	6^{5}	14
(France) J Boutter (France) F Santoro	3	7^{7}	12
(United States) B Bryan (United States) M Bryan	4	6^{4}
WC	(Australia) P Baccanello (Australia) L Smith	6	7^{7}
(South Africa) B Haygarth (Israel) H Levy	7^{9}	6^{3}	5
(Australia) J Kerr (Australia) G Silcock	6^{7}	7^{7}	7
WC	(Australia) A Ilie (Australia) D Petrovic	4	3
12	(Zimbabwe) W Black (Zimbabwe) K Ullyett	6	6
14	(Zimbabwe) B Black (Germany) D Prinosil	6	6
(Argentina) S Roitman (Argentina) A Schneiter	2	3
(The Bahamas) M Knowles (United States) B MacPhie	6	7^{8}
(Australia) B Ellwood (North Macedonia) A Kitinov	1	6^{6}
(Italy) C Brandi (Italy) L Tieleman	4	3
(France) A Clément (France) S Grosjean	6	6
(Israel) J Erlich (Russia) Y Schukin	1	4
2	(South Africa) E Ferreira (Czech Republic) D Rikl	6	6

Second round
6	(Sweden) N Kulti (Belarus) M Mirnyi	6^{5}	6^{4}
WC	(Australia) P Baccanello (Australia) L Smith	7^{7}	7^{7}
(Australia) J Kerr (Australia) G Silcock	6	6^{1}	4
12	(Zimbabwe) W Black (Zimbabwe) K Ullyett	4	7^{7}	6
14	(Zimbabwe) B Black (Germany) D Prinosil	3	7	6
(The Bahamas) M Knowles (United States) B MacPhie	6	5	2
(France) A Clément (France) S Grosjean	2	6	6
2	(South Africa) E Ferreira (Czech Republic) D Rikl	6	4	4

Third round
WC	(Australia) P Baccanello (Australia) L Smith	4	4
12	(Zimbabwe) W Black (Zimbabwe) K Ullyett	6	6
14	(Zimbabwe) B Black (Germany) D Prinosil	2	6	6
(France) A Clément (France) S Grosjean	6	1	4

Quarterfinals
12	(Zimbabwe) W Black (Zimbabwe) K Ullyett	3	4
14	(Zimbabwe) B Black (Germany) D Prinosil	6	6
