= 2001 Australian Open – Men's singles =

Men's singles
- 2001 Australian Open

Final
- Champion: (United States) Andre Agassi
- Runner-up: (France) Arnaud Clément
- Score: 6–4, 6–2, 6–2
- Date: 28 January 2001

Details
- Draw: 128
- Seeds: 16

Events
Singles	men	women		boys	girls
Doubles	men	women	mixed	boys	girls
WC Singles	men	women	quad
WC Doubles	men	women	quad
Legends	men	women	mixed
- Australian Open

Defending champion Andre Agassi defeated Arnaud Clément in the final, 6–4, 6–2, 6–2 to win the men's singles tennis title at the 2001 Australian Open. It was his third Australian Open title and seventh major title overall.

This was the first main-draw major appearance for future Tour Finals champion Nikolay Davydenko.

== Seeds ==
The seeded players are listed below. Andre Agassi is the champion; others show the round in which they were eliminated.

1. (Brazil) Gustavo Kuerten (second round)
2. (Russia) Marat Safin (fourth round)
3. (United States) Pete Sampras (fourth round)
4. (Sweden) Magnus Norman (fourth round)
5. (Russia) Yevgeny Kafelnikov (quarterfinals)
6. (United States) Andre Agassi (champion)
7. (Australia) Lleyton Hewitt (third round)
8. (United Kingdom) Tim Henman (fourth round)
9. (Spain) Juan Carlos Ferrero (second round)
10. (South Africa) Wayne Ferreira (third round)
11. (Argentina) Franco Squillari (second round)
12. (Australia) Patrick Rafter (semifinals)
13. (France) Cédric Pioline (third round)
14. (Slovakia) Dominik Hrbatý (quarterfinals)
15. (France) Arnaud Clément (final)
16. (France) Sébastien Grosjean (semifinals)

== Draw ==
Key

- Q = Qualifier
- WC = Wild card
- LL = Lucky loser
- Alt = Alternate
- ITF = ITF entry
- PR = Protected ranking
- SR = Special ranking
- SE = Special exempt
- JE = Junior exempt
- JR = Junior Accelerator Programme entrant
- CO = College Accelerator Programme entrant
- NG = Next Gen Accelerator Program entrant
- w/o = Walkover
- r = Retired
- d = Defaulted

=== Finals ===
Quarterfinals
15	(France) Arnaud Clément	6	5	7^{7}	7^{7}
5	(Russia) Yevgeny Kafelnikov	4	7	6^{3}	6^{3}
16	(France) Sébastien Grosjean	6	6	6
(Spain) Carlos Moyà	1	4	2
6	(United States) Andre Agassi	7	6	6
(United States) Todd Martin	5	3	4
12	(Australia) Patrick Rafter	6	6^{4}	7	6
14	(Slovakia) Dominik Hrbatý	2	7^{7}	5	0

Semifinals
15	(France) Arnaud Clément	5	2	7^{7}	7	6
16	(France) Sébastien Grosjean	7	6	6^{4}	5	2
6	(United States) Andre Agassi	7	2	6^{5}	6	6
12	(Australia) Patrick Rafter	5	6	7^{7}	2	3

Final
15	(France) Arnaud Clément	4	2	2
6	(United States) Andre Agassi	6	6	6

=== Top half ===
==== Section 1 ====
First round
1	(Brazil) G Kuerten	7	6^{6}	6	7
(Argentina) G Gaudio	5	7^{8}	3	5
(United Kingdom) G Rusedski	3	6	7^{7}	6
Q	(South Africa) M Ondruska	6	3	6^{3}	2
(Austria) S Koubek	3	6	6	6
(United States) J Tarango	6	3	4	2
Q	(Germany) L Burgsmüller	5	6^{7}	6	7	6
(Germany) D Elsner	7	7^{9}	3	5	4
(France) N Escudé	6	3	7^{7}	5	6
(Spain) J Balcells	3	6	6^{5}	7	4
(France) A Di Pasquale	4	6	1	4
(Switzerland) R Federer	6	4	6	6
(Belgium) O Rochus	3	4	0
(Spain) A Martín	6	6	6
Q	(Spain) T Robredo	3	2	5
15	(France) A Clément	6	6	7

Second round
1	(Brazil) G Kuerten	6	4	3	6	7
(United Kingdom) G Rusedski	4	6	6	2	9
(Austria) S Koubek	6^{3}	4	3
Q	(Germany) L Burgsmüller	7^{7}	6	6
(France) N Escudé	1	4	4
(Switzerland) R Federer	6	6	6
(Spain) A Martín	2	1	1
15	(France) A Clément	6	6	6

Third round
(United Kingdom) G Rusedski	6	6	6
Q	(Germany) L Burgsmüller	1	2	1
(Switzerland) R Federer	6^{5}	4	4
15	(France) A Clément	7^{7}	6	6

Fourth round
(United Kingdom) G Rusedski	3	2	5
15	(France) A Clément	6	6	7

==== Section 2 ====
First round
10	(South Africa) W Ferreira	6	7	6
(Morocco) K Alami	3	5	4
(France) J Boutter	6	6	6
Q	(Serbia and Montenegro) N Zimonjić	1	4	3
(Sweden) A Vinciguerra	7^{7}	6	6
(Romania) A Voinea	6^{4}	3	2
WC	(France) N Mahut	2	4	6	6	4
(Ukraine) A Medvedev	6	6	2	4	6
(United States) C Woodruff	6	4	4	7	6
(United States) J-M Gambill	3	6	6	5	3
(Germany) A Popp	3	6	6	3	6
(Thailand) P Srichaphan	6	4	1	6	2
(Germany) N Kiefer	6	7	6
(Zimbabwe) W Black	3	5	2
(Germany) J Knippschild	1	4	2
5	(Russia) Y Kafelnikov	6	6	6

Second round
10	(South Africa) W Ferreira	3	6	6	6
(France) J Boutter	6	2	2	3
(Sweden) A Vinciguerra	6	7^{7}	6
(Ukraine) A Medvedev	3	6^{5}	2
(United States) C Woodruff	4	6	6	6
(Germany) A Popp	6	3	4	4
(Germany) N Kiefer	2	6	6	3	0
5	(Russia) Y Kafelnikov	6	3	3	6	6

Third round
10	(South Africa) W Ferreira	0	6	4	3
(Sweden) A Vinciguerra	6	3	6	6
(United States) C Woodruff	7^{7}	5	2	3
5	(Russia) Y Kafelnikov	6^{3}	7	6	6

Fourth round
(Sweden) A Vinciguerra	5	5	1
5	(Russia) Y Kafelnikov	7	7	6

==== Section 3 ====
First round
4	(Sweden) M Norman	1	7	6	7^{7}
(France) S Huet	6	5	1	6^{5}
(United States) M Chang	5	6	3	4
(France) F Santoro	7	4	6	6
(Argentina) G Coria	4	7^{7}	6	6
(Chile) F González	6	6^{5}	4	4
Q	(Russia) A Stoliarov	3	2	6	4
(Spain) Á Calatrava	6	6	3	6
(Italy) G Pozzi	1	7^{9}	6	6
Q	(United States) A O'Brien	6	6^{7}	4	2
Q	(Germany) T Behrend	1	2	0
(Sweden) T Johansson	6	6	6
(Netherlands) J Siemerink	2	6	6	3	6
(Netherlands) S Schalken	6	3	4	6	3
(Croatia) I Ljubičić	0	6^{6}	4
16	(France) S Grosjean	6	7^{8}	6

Second round
4	(Sweden) M Norman	7^{8}	6	6
(France) F Santoro	6^{6}	3	0
(Argentina) G Coria	4	3	6	2
(Spain) Á Calatrava	6	6	3	6
(Italy) G Pozzi	6^{1}	5	3
(Sweden) T Johansson	7^{7}	7	6
(Netherlands) J Siemerink	3	0	4
16	(France) S Grosjean	6	6	6

Third round
4	(Sweden) M Norman	7^{7}	3	7^{7}	6
(Spain) Á Calatrava	6^{2}	6	6^{2}	3
(Sweden) T Johansson	4	1	4
16	(France) S Grosjean	6	6	6

Fourth round
4	(Sweden) M Norman	6^{7}	3	6	4
16	(France) S Grosjean	7^{9}	6	0	6

==== Section 4 ====
First round
11	(Argentina) F Squillari	6	6	6
(Spain) D Sánchez	3	4	2
(Canada) D Nestor	2	6	6	6
(Spain) F Mantilla	6	3	2	4
(Germany) R Schüttler	7	4	7^{7}	6
Q	(Slovakia) L Švarc	5	6	6^{4}	4
WC	(Australia) D Petrović	1	6	0	3
(Armenia) S Sargsian	6	1	6	6
(Spain) C Moyà	6	6	6
(Chile) M Ríos	3	3	2
(Germany) C Vinck	3	1	6^{3}
(Switzerland) M Rosset	6	6	7^{7}
(Chile) N Massú	3	1	1
(Germany) T Haas	6	6	6
(Sweden) J Björkman	5	6	6	3	2
7	(Australia) L Hewitt	7	4	2	6	6

Second round
11	(Argentina) F Squillari	6	2	4	5
(Canada) D Nestor	3	6	6	7
(Germany) R Schüttler	6	7	4	6
(Armenia) S Sargsian	3	5	6	4
(Spain) C Moyà	6	6	6
(Switzerland) M Rosset	2	1	3
(Germany) T Haas	5	6^{5}	4
7	(Australia) L Hewitt	7	7^{7}	6

Third round
(Canada) D Nestor	4	2	5
(Germany) R Schüttler	6	6	7
(Spain) C Moyà	4	6	5	6	7
7	(Australia) L Hewitt	6	1	7	2	5

Fourth round
(Germany) R Schüttler	6^{2}	3	4
(Spain) C Moyà	7^{7}	6	6

=== Bottom half ===
==== Section 5 ====
First round
6	(United States) A Agassi	6	7	6
(Czech Republic) J Vaněk	0	5	3
(Spain) G Puentes	6	4	2	1
(United States) P Goldstein	4	6	6	6
(Australia) M Breen	6	4	6	3	4
(Philippines) C Mamiit	1	6	4	6	6
(Spain) S Bruguera	5	1	6	6	1
(Germany) D Prinosil	7	6	1	2	6
(Spain) J Díaz	1	1	4
(Russia) M Youzhny	6	6	6
(Argentina) M Zabaleta	6	6	5	2	6
WC	(Australia) T Woodbridge	4	2	7	6	4
Q	(Netherlands) P Wessels	3	4	6	4
(Australia) A Ilie	6	6	3	6
WC	(Australia) A Jones	3	6^{3}	2
9	(Spain) JC Ferrero	6	7^{7}	6

Second round
6	(United States) A Agassi	6	6	6
(United States) P Goldstein	1	3	1
(Philippines) C Mamiit	6	6	2	3	2
(Germany) D Prinosil	4	3	6	6	6
(Russia) M Youzhny	5	7^{7}	6	6
(Argentina) M Zabaleta	7	6^{3}	2	4
(Australia) A Ilie	3	6	6	1	6
9	(Spain) JC Ferrero	6	2	1	6	2

Third round
6	(United States) A Agassi	7^{13}	5
(Germany) D Prinosil	6^{11}	0	r
(Russia) M Youzhny	6^{3}	4	2
(Australia) A Ilie	7^{7}	6	6

Fourth round
6	(United States) A Agassi	6^{1}	6	6	6
(Australia) A Ilie	7^{7}	3	0	3

==== Section 6 ====
First round
13	(France) C Pioline	7^{7}	6	6
(Italy) D Sanguinetti	6^{3}	4	2
(Czech Republic) C Doseděl	7^{7}	6	4	3	6
(Spain) A Portas	6^{2}	2	6	6	3
(Australia) J Stoltenberg	6^{3}	4	6^{1}
(Argentina) A Calleri	7^{7}	6	7^{7}
(Zimbabwe) B Black	5	4	3
(United States) T Martin	7	6	6
(Argentina) JI Chela	6	6	6^{0}	7^{7}
WC	(Japan) T Suzuki	3	1	7^{7}	6^{4}
(Spain) F Vicente	6	3	3	1
(Israel) H Levy	4	6	6	6
(Belarus) V Voltchkov	6	5	3	2
(Czech Republic) B Ulihrach	4	7	6	6
(Slovakia) K Kučera	6^{5}	6	4	6^{3}
3	(United States) P Sampras	7^{7}	3	6	7^{7}

Second round
13	(France) C Pioline	7^{8}	1	6	6
(Czech Republic) C Doseděl	6^{6}	6	4	4
(Argentina) A Calleri	6	6^{5}	6^{7}	6	2
(United States) T Martin	1	7^{7}	7^{9}	4	6
(Argentina) JI Chela	6	6	6
(Israel) H Levy	2	2	3
(Czech Republic) B Ulihrach	6^{5}	6^{5}	6	5
3	(United States) P Sampras	7^{7}	7^{7}	4	7

Third round
13	(France) C Pioline	4	6	3	4
(United States) T Martin	6	3	6	6
(Argentina) JI Chela	4	6	6	5	2
3	(United States) P Sampras	6	4	4	7	6

Fourth round
(United States) T Martin	6^{2}	6	6	6
3	(United States) P Sampras	7^{7}	3	4	4

==== Section 7 ====
First round
8	(United Kingdom) T Henman	7^{7}	6	6
(Morocco) H Arazi	6^{5}	4	4
(South Korea) H-t Lee	6	3	4	6	6
(Ecuador) N Lapentti	3	6	6	3	8
(Australia) W Arthurs	6	7	4	6
Q	(Russia) Y Schukin	3	5	6	2
Q	(Switzerland) I Heuberger	6	5
(Morocco) Y El Aynaoui	2	4	r
(Switzerland) M Kratochvil	6	6	7^{7}
(Netherlands) R Sluiter	2	2	6^{2}
(Belarus) M Mirnyi	7^{8}	6	6
WC	(Australia) T Perry	6^{6}	4	3
Q	(Czech Republic) O Fukárek	6^{6}	5	3
Q	(Russia) N Davydenko	7^{8}	7	6
WC	(Australia) S Draper	3	2	5
12	(Australia) P Rafter	6	6	7

Second round
8	(United Kingdom) T Henman	6	7^{7}	7^{9}
(Ecuador) N Lapentti	1	6^{3}	6^{7}
(Australia) W Arthurs	6	3	6	3	6
Q	(Switzerland) I Heuberger	3	6	3	6	1
(Switzerland) M Kratochvil	6	6	6^{5}	6
(Belarus) M Mirnyi	3	4	7^{7}	3
Q	(Russia) N Davydenko	4	6	3	6^{4}
12	(Australia) P Rafter	6	2	6	7^{7}

Third round
8	(United Kingdom) T Henman	6	6	0	6
(Australia) W Arthurs	3	2	6	2
(Switzerland) M Kratochvil	4	1	5
12	(Australia) P Rafter	6	6	7

Fourth round
8	(United Kingdom) T Henman	2	3	3
12	(Australia) P Rafter	6	6	6

==== Section 8 ====
First round
14	(Slovakia) D Hrbatý	3	3	6	6	6
Q	(Monaco) J-R Lisnard	6	6	4	1	1
(Spain) F Clavet	6	6	6
(Germany) M Hantschk	2	0	2
(Belgium) C Rochus	4	3	6	6	9
(United States) J Gimelstob	6	6	4	0	7
(Australia) R Fromberg	2	4	3
(Brazil) A Sá	6	6	6
Q	(Argentina) G Cañas	6	6	6
(Switzerland) G Bastl	4	4	3
(Italy) A Gaudenzi	6	4	4	7	4
(Czech Republic) M Tabara	3	6	6	5	6
Q	(United States) M Russell	6^{5}	7^{7}	5	4
(Romania) A Pavel	7^{7}	6^{5}	7	6
(Spain) G Blanco	4	6	4	6^{5}
2	(Russia) M Safin	6	1	6	7^{7}

Second round
14	(Slovakia) D Hrbatý	6	6	6
(Spain) F Clavet	3	4	2
(Belgium) C Rochus	6	6	6
(Brazil) A Sá	3	2	2
Q	(Argentina) G Cañas	6^{4}	3	2
(Czech Republic) M Tabara	7^{7}	6	6
(Romania) A Pavel	6	3	4	6^{5}
2	(Russia) M Safin	4	6	6	7^{7}

Third round
14	(Slovakia) D Hrbatý	6	6	6
(Belgium) C Rochus	4	4	2
(Czech Republic) M Tabara	1	1	4
2	(Russia) M Safin	6	6	6

Fourth round
14	(Slovakia) D Hrbatý	6	7^{8}	6
2	(Russia) M Safin	2	6^{6}	4

Preceded by 2000 US Open – Men's singles	Grand Slam men's singles	Succeeded by 2001 French Open – Men's singles
