= 2001 Australian Open – Women's doubles =

Women's doubles
- 2001 Australian Open

Final
- Champions: (United States) Serena Williams (United States) Venus Williams
- Runners-up: (United States) Lindsay Davenport (United States) Corina Morariu
- Score: 6–2, 4–6, 6–4
- Date: 28 January 2001

Details
- Draw: 64
- Seeds: 16

Events
Singles	men	women		boys	girls
Doubles	men	women	mixed	boys	girls
WC Singles	men	women	quad
WC Doubles	men	women	quad
Legends	men	women	mixed
- Australian Open

Serena and Venus Williams defeated Lindsay Davenport and Corina Morariu in the final, 6–2, 4–6, 6–4 to win the women's doubles tennis title at the 2001 Australian Open. It was the Williams sisters' fourth major doubles title, and they completed the career Golden Slam in doubles with the win.

Lisa Raymond and Rennae Stubbs were the defending champions, but lost in the first round to Martina Hingis and Monica Seles.

== Seeds ==
Champion seeds are indicated in bold text while text in italics indicates the round in which those seeds were eliminated.

1. (United States) Lisa Raymond / (Australia) Rennae Stubbs (first round)
2. (United States) Nicole Arendt / (Japan) Ai Sugiyama (semifinals)
3. (Russia) Anna Kournikova / (Austria) Barbara Schett (quarterfinals)
4. (Spain) Virginia Ruano Pascual / (Argentina) Paola Suárez (quarterfinals)
5. (France) Mary Pierce / (France) Sandrine Testud (third round)
6. (Zimbabwe) Cara Black / (Russia) Elena Likhovtseva (second round)
7. (United States) Lindsay Davenport / (United States) Corina Morariu (final)
8. (Belgium) Els Callens / (France) Anne-Gaëlle Sidot (second round)
9. (France) Alexandra Fusai / (Italy) Rita Grande (quarterfinals)
10. (Spain) Conchita Martínez / (Argentina) Patricia Tarabini (first round)
11. (Australia) Nicole Pratt / (United States) Meghann Shaughnessy (quarterfinals)
12. (Slovenia) Tina Križan / (Kazakhstan) Irina Selyutina (second round)
13. (United States) Kimberly Po / (Spain) Magüi Serna (third round)
14. (Netherlands) Kristie Boogert / (Netherlands) Miriam Oremans (third round)
15. (Canada) Sonya Jeyaseelan / (Slovakia) Karina Habšudová (first round)
16. (Belgium) Kim Clijsters / (Belgium) Laurence Courtois (third round)

== Draw ==
Key

- Q = Qualifier
- WC = Wild card
- LL = Lucky loser
- Alt = Alternate
- ITF = ITF entry
- PR = Protected ranking
- SR = Special ranking
- SE = Special exempt
- JE = Junior exempt
- JR = Junior Accelerator Programme entrant
- CO = College Accelerator Programme entrant
- NG = Next Gen Accelerator Program entrant
- w/o = Walkover
- r = Retired
- d = Defaulted

=== Finals ===
Semifinals
(Switzerland) Martina Hingis (United States) Monica Seles	5	2
WC	(United States) Serena Williams (United States) Venus Williams	7	6
7	(United States) Lindsay Davenport (United States) Corina Morariu	7	6
2	(United States) Nicole Arendt (Japan) Ai Sugiyama	5	2

Final
WC	(United States) Serena Williams (United States) Venus Williams	6	4	6
7	(United States) Lindsay Davenport (United States) Corina Morariu	2	6	4

=== Top half ===
==== Section 1 ====
First round
1	(United States) L Raymond (Australia) R Stubbs	6^{2}	3
(Switzerland) M Hingis (United States) M Seles	7^{7}	6
(United States) J Capriati (Federal Republic of Yugoslavia) J Dokić	6	6
(Indonesia) Y Basuki (Netherlands) C Vis	2	3
(Spain) M Sánchez Lorenzo (Germany) C Schneider	4	2
(South Africa) L Horn (Croatia) I Majoli	6	6
(Croatia) J Kostanić (Uzbekistan) I Tulyaganova	2	3
16	(Belgium) K Clijsters (Belgium) L Courtois	6	6
11	(Australia) N Pratt (United States) M Shaughnessy	6	7
(South Africa) N de Villiers (Australia) A Ellwood	2	5
(Italy) A Canepa (Slovenia) M Matevžič	6	6
(Germany) A Glass (Germany) B Lamade	1	3
(United States) A Frazier (United States) K Schlukebir	6	7^{7}
(Germany) B Rittner (Switzerland) P Schnyder	4	6^{3}
(Romania) R Dragomir (Italy) S Farina Elia	5	4
5	(France) M Pierce (France) S Testud	7	6

Second round
(Switzerland) M Hingis (United States) M Seles	6	6
(United States) J Capriati (Federal Republic of Yugoslavia) J Dokić	3	3
(South Africa) L Horn (Croatia) I Majoli	6	5	1
16	(Belgium) K Clijsters (Belgium) L Courtois	3	7	6
11	(Australia) N Pratt (United States) M Shaughnessy	6	6
(Italy) A Canepa (Slovenia) M Matevžič	1	2
(United States) A Frazier (United States) K Schlukebir	0	6	4
5	(France) M Pierce (France) S Testud	6	4	6

Third round
(Switzerland) M Hingis (United States) M Seles	6	6
16	(Belgium) K Clijsters (Belgium) L Courtois	2	4
11	(Australia) N Pratt (United States) M Shaughnessy	1	7^{9}	6
5	(France) M Pierce (France) S Testud	6	6^{7}	4

Quarterfinals
(Switzerland) M Hingis (United States) M Seles	6	7
11	(Australia) N Pratt (United States) M Shaughnessy	0	5

==== Section 2 ====
First round
3	(Russia) A Kournikova (Austria) B Schett	6	6
(United States) D Buth (Slovenia) T Hergold	1	2
(Russia) L Krasnoroutskaya (Belarus) N Ostrovskaya	2	6^{3}
(United States) E deLone (Australia) A Molik	6	7^{7}
(Germany) A Bachmann (Denmark) E Dyrberg	4	6	5
(Netherlands) Y Basting (Slovenia) K Srebotnik	6	4	7
(Japan) S Asagoe (Japan) Y Yoshida	6	6
15	(Canada) S Jeyaseelan (Slovakia) K Habšudová	4	2
12	(Slovenia) T Križan (Kazakhstan) I Selyutina	6	4	6
(Spain) G León García (Spain) G Riera	0	6	3
(Sweden) Å Carlsson (Bulgaria) M Maleeva	6	6
(Slovakia) D Hantuchová (Australia) L Pleming	1	4
WC	(United States) S Williams (United States) V Williams	6	6
(Canada) R Kolbovic (India) N Vaidyanathan	1	3
(South Africa) K Grant (Austria) M Maruska	0	1
8	(Belgium) E Callens (France) A-G Sidot	6	6

Second round
3	(Russia) A Kournikova (Austria) B Schett	6	6
(United States) E deLone (Australia) A Molik	2	2
(Netherlands) Y Basting (Slovenia) K Srebotnik	6	6^{5}	2
(Japan) S Asagoe (Japan) Y Yoshida	3	7^{7}	6
12	(Slovenia) T Križan (Kazakhstan) I Selyutina	4	4
(Sweden) Å Carlsson (Bulgaria) M Maleeva	6	6
WC	(United States) S Williams (United States) V Williams	6	6
8	(Belgium) E Callens (France) A-G Sidot	4	2

Third round
3	(Russia) A Kournikova (Austria) B Schett	2	6	6
(Japan) S Asagoe (Japan) Y Yoshida	6	3	3
(Sweden) Å Carlsson (Bulgaria) M Maleeva	1	6	4
WC	(United States) S Williams (United States) V Williams	6	4	6

Quarterfinals
3	(Russia) A Kournikova (Austria) B Schett	6	1	1
WC	(United States) S Williams (United States) V Williams	3	6	6

=== Bottom half ===
==== Section 3 ====
First round
7	(United States) L Davenport (United States) C Morariu	4	6	6
(Australia) T Musgrave (Australia) B Stewart	6	0	1
(Italy) T Garbin (Slovakia) J Husárová	6	6
(Czech Republic) E Martincová (Slovenia) P Rampre	4	1
(Argentina) M Díaz Oliva (Venezuela) M Vento	2	4
(Hungary) P Mandula (Austria) P Wartusch	6	6
(Italy) G Casoni (Slovakia) H Nagyová	6	6
10	(Spain) C Martínez (Argentina) P Tarabini	3	2
13	(United States) K Po (Spain) M Serna	6	6
(Federal Republic of Yugoslavia) S Načuk (Slovenia) T Pisnik	2	3
(China) N Li (China) T Li	2	6	2
(Japan) R Hiraki (Netherlands) S Noorlander	6	3	6
(Netherlands) A Hopmans (Austria) S Plischke	1	5
WC	(Australia) E Dominikovic (Belgium) J Henin	6	7
(Spain) R M Andres (Spain) C Martínez Granados	4	1
4	(Spain) V Ruano Pascual (Argentina) P Suárez	6	6

Second round
7	(United States) L Davenport (United States) C Morariu	6	6
(Italy) T Garbin (Slovakia) J Husárová	1	3
(Hungary) P Mandula (Austria) P Wartusch	5	6	6
(Italy) G Casoni (Slovakia) J Husárová	7	3	2
13	(United States) K Po (Spain) M Serna	6^{1}	6	6
(Japan) R Hiraki (Netherlands) S Noorlander	7^{7}	2	4
WC	(Australia) E Dominikovic (Belgium) J Henin	4	2
4	(Spain) V Ruano Pascual (Argentina) P Suárez	6	6

Third round
7	(United States) L Davenport (United States) C Morariu	6	6
(Italy) T Garbin (Slovakia) J Husárová	2	4
13	(United States) K Po (Spain) M Serna	6	3	4
4	(Spain) V Ruano Pascual (Argentina) P Suárez	1	6	6

Quarterfinals
7	(United States) L Davenport (United States) C Morariu	6	6
4	(Spain) V Ruano Pascual (Argentina) P Suárez	3	2

==== Section 4 ====
First round
6	(Zimbabwe) C Black (Russia) E Likhovtseva	1	6	6
(Spain) E Bes (United States) M Tu	6	4	3
(Australia) R McQuillan (Australia) L McShea	3	6	6
(France) N Dechy (France) É Loit	6	3	4
(Chinese Taipei) J Lee (Indonesia) W Prakusya	6^{3}	7	6
(Russia) A Jidkova (Belarus) T Poutchek	7^{7}	5	3
(Bulgaria) L Bacheva (Spain) C Torrens Valero	4	2
9	(France) A Fusai (Italy) R Grande	6	6
14	(Netherlands) K Boogert (Netherlands) M Oremans	0	7	6
WC	(Australia) K-A Guse (Australia) C Wheeler	6	5	4
WC	(Australia) A Grahame (Australia) A Jensen	4	1
(United States) L Osterloh (United States) A Stevenson	6	6
(Hungary) K Marosi-Aracama (United Kingdom) L Woodroffe	6	6
(Russia) N Petrova (France) V Razzano	4	4
(Belgium) S Appelmans (Poland) M Grzybowska	0	1
2	(United States) N Arendt (Japan) A Sugiyama	6	6

Second round
6	(Zimbabwe) C Black (Russia) E Likhovtseva	6^{5}	7	5
(Australia) R McQuillan (Australia) L McShea	7^{7}	5	7
(Chinese Taipei) J Lee (Indonesia) W Prakusya	6	1	1
9	(France) A Fusai (Italy) R Grande	1	6	6
14	(Netherlands) K Boogert (Netherlands) M Oremans	6	0	7
(United States) L Osterloh (United States) A Stevenson	3	6	5
(Hungary) K Marosi-Aracama (United Kingdom) L Woodroffe	2	7^{8}	3
2	(United States) N Arendt (Japan) A Sugiyama	6	6^{6}	6

Third round
(Australia) R McQuillan (Australia) L McShea	5	6	4
9	(France) A Fusai (Italy) R Grande	7	4	6
14	(Netherlands) K Boogert (Netherlands) M Oremans	2	6	3
2	(United States) N Arendt (Japan) A Sugiyama	6	4	6

Quarterfinals
9	(France) A Fusai (Italy) R Grande	5	3
2	(United States) N Arendt (Japan) A Sugiyama	7	6
