= 2004 China Open – Men's doubles =

Men's doubles
- 2004 China Open

Final
- Champions: (United States) Justin Gimelstob (United States) Graydon Oliver
- Runners-up: (United States) Alex Bogomolov Jr. (United States) Taylor Dent
- Score: 4–6, 6–4, 7–6^{(8–6)}

Events
Singles	men	women
Doubles	men	women	mixed
← 1997 ·	China Open	· 2005 →

The event was being held for the first time since 1997. Mahesh Bhupathi and Leander Paes were the defending champions.

Justin Gimelstob and Graydon Oliver won the title, defeating Alex Bogomolov Jr. and Taylor Dent 4–6, 6–4, 7–6^{(8–6)} in the final.

== Seeds ==
1. (Australia) Ashley Fisher / (United States) Tripp Phillips (quarterfinals)
2. (United States) Justin Gimelstob / (United States) Graydon Oliver (champions)
3. (Slovakia) Dominik Hrbatý / (United States) Scott Humphries (quarterfinals)
4. (Germany) Rainer Schüttler / (Russia) Mikhail Youzhny (first round)

== Draw ==
=== Key ===
- Q = Qualifier
- WC = Wild card
- LL = Lucky loser
- Alt = Alternate
- SE = Special exempt
- PR = Protected ranking
- ITF = ITF entry
- JE = Junior exempt
- w/o = Walkover
- r = Retired
- d = Defaulted
- SR = Special ranking

=== Draw ===
First round
1	(Australia) A Fisher (United States) T Phillips	6	6
(United States) D Bowen (United States) J Marshall	4	1
WC	(China) SX Zeng (China) B Zhu	2	7	3
(United States) A Bogomolov Jr. (United States) T Dent	6	5	6
3	(Slovakia) D Hrbatý (United States) S Humphries	2	6	6
WC	(China) H Lu (China) Y Wang	6	1	2
(United States) B Coupe (Australia) N Healey	6	6
(Spain) JC Ferrero (Spain) G García-López	2	3
(Sweden) J Landsberg (Japan) T Shimada	7	6
(Chinese Taipei) Y-h Lu (Denmark) K Pless	5	4
(Australia) S Huss (Sweden) R Lindstedt	7^{7}	1	6
4	(Germany) R Schüttler (Russia) M Youzhny	6^{4}	6	4
(South Korea) H-t Lee (United States) G Weiner	6	1	6^{4}
(Switzerland) I Heuberger (Finland) J Nieminen	1	6	7^{7}
(Thailand) Sa Ratiwatana (Thailand) So Ratiwatana	4	6^{4}
2	(United States) J Gimelstob (United States) G Oliver	6	7^{7}

Quarterfinals
1	(Australia) A Fisher (United States) T Phillips	3	2
(United States) A Bogomolov Jr. (United States) T Dent	6	6
3	(Slovakia) D Hrbatý (United States) S Humphries	3	3
(United States) B Coupe (Australia) N Healey	6	6
(Sweden) J Landsberg (Japan) T Shimada	6	2	7^{7}
(Australia) S Huss (Sweden) R Lindstedt	3	6	6^{4}
(Switzerland) I Heuberger (Finland) J Nieminen	3	4
2	(United States) J Gimelstob (United States) G Oliver	6	6

Semifinals
(United States) A Bogomolov Jr. (United States) T Dent	6	6
(United States) B Coupe (Australia) N Healey	3	2
(Sweden) J Landsberg (Japan) T Shimada	2	3
2	(United States) J Gimelstob (United States) G Oliver	6	6

Final
(United States) A Bogomolov Jr. (United States) T Dent	6	4	6^{6}
2	(United States) J Gimelstob (United States) G Oliver	4	6	7^{8}
