= 2004 China Open – Men's singles =

Men's singles
- 2004 China Open

Final
- Champion: (Russia) Marat Safin
- Runner-up: (Russia) Mikhail Youzhny
- Score: 7–6^{(7–4)}, 7–5

Details
- Draw: 32 (3WC/4Q/1LL)
- Seeds: 8

Events
Singles	men	women
Doubles	men	women	mixed
← 1997 ·	China Open	· 2005 →

The event was being held for the first time since 1997. Jim Courier was the last champion.

Marat Safin won the title, beating Mikhail Youzhny 7–6^{(7–4)}, 7–5 in the final.

== Seeds ==
1. (Spain) Carlos Moyá (first round)
2. (Spain) Juan Carlos Ferrero (second round)
3. (Argentina) David Nalbandian (quarterfinals)
4. (Germany) Rainer Schüttler (second round)
5. (Russia) Marat Safin (champion)
6. (Thailand) Paradorn Srichaphan (semifinals)
7. (United States) Taylor Dent (second round)
8. (Slovakia) Dominik Hrbatý (quarterfinals)

== Draw ==
=== Key ===
- Q = Qualifier
- WC = Wild card
- LL = Lucky loser
- Alt = Alternate
- SE = Special exempt
- PR = Protected ranking
- ITF = ITF entry
- JE = Junior exempt
- w/o = Walkover
- r = Retired
- d = Defaulted
- SR = Special ranking

=== Finals ===
Semifinals
6	(Thailand) Paradorn Srichaphan	4	4
(Russia) Mikhail Youzhny	6	6
(Finland) Jarkko Nieminen	2	4
5	(Russia) Marat Safin	6	6

Final
(Russia) Mikhail Youzhny	6^{4}	5
5	(Russia) Marat Safin	7^{7}	7

=== Top half ===
First round
1	(Spain) C Moyá	3	3
Q	(France) J-W Tsonga	6	6
(United States) G Weiner	2	4
(South Korea) H-t Lee	6	6
Q	(United Kingdom) A Parmar	3	2
(Israel) N Okun	6	6
(France) J-R Lisnard	4	5
6	(Thailand) P Srichaphan	6	7
4	(Germany) R Schüttler	6	6
(Australia) P Baccanello	4	3
(Russia) M Youzhny	7	7^{7}
(Switzerland) I Heuberger	5	6^{4}
Q	(Australia) N Healey	7	5	2
(Italy) D Sanguinetti	5	7	6
WC	(China) Y Wang	2	2
8	(Slovakia) D Hrbatý	6	6

Second round
Q	(France) J-W Tsonga	6^{7}	3
(South Korea) H-t Lee	7^{9}	6
(Israel) N Okun	3	6	6^{6}
6	(Thailand) P Srichaphan	6	3	7^{8}
4	(Germany) R Schüttler	6^{4}	1
(Russia) M Youzhny	7^{7}	6
(Italy) D Sanguinetti	2	2
8	(Slovakia) D Hrbatý	6	6

Quarterfinals
(South Korea) H-t Lee	4	3
6	(Thailand) P Srichaphan	6	6
(Russia) M Youzhny	6	6
8	(Slovakia) D Hrbatý	4	2

Semifinals
6	(Thailand) P Srichaphan	4	4
(Russia) M Youzhny	6	6

=== Bottom half ===
First round
7	(United States) T Dent	6	6
Q	(Australia) P Luczak	3	2
(Finland) J Nieminen	7	6
(Spain) G García-López	5	4
(Chinese Taipei) Y-h Lu	7	6
WC	(China) B Zhu	5	2
(Denmark) K Pless	6^{5}	6	3
3	(Argentina) D Nalbandian	7^{7}	3	6
5	(Russia) M Safin	6	7
(United States) A Bogomolov Jr.	4	5
LL	(India) P Amritraj	6	4	2
WC	(China) H Lu	4	6	6
(Germany) L Burgsmüller	2	2
(United States) K Kim	6	6
(United States) J Gimelstob	4	1
2	(Spain) JC Ferrero	6	6

Second round
7	(United States) T Dent	3	5
(Finland) J Nieminen	6	7
(Chinese Taipei) Y-h Lu	7^{8}	4	4
3	(Argentina) D Nalbandian	6^{6}	6	6
5	(Russia) M Safin	6	6
WC	(China) H Lu	2	2
(United States) K Kim	6	6
2	(Spain) JC Ferrero	4	4

Quarterfinals
(Finland) J Nieminen	6	2	6
3	(Argentina) D Nalbandian	2	6	2
5	(Russia) M Safin	6	6
(United States) K Kim	2	4

Semifinals
(Finland) J Nieminen	2	4
5	(Russia) M Safin	6	6

== Qualifying ==
=== Seeds ===
1. (Australia) Peter Luczak (qualified)
2. (United Kingdom) Arvind Parmar (qualified)
3. (France) Gilles Simon (first round)
4. (United Kingdom) Jamie Delgado (second round)
5. (France) Jo-Wilfried Tsonga (qualified)
6. (Japan) Tasuku Iwami (second round)
7. (India) Prakash Amritraj (qualifying competition, lucky loser)
8. (Netherlands) Paul Logtens (qualifying competition)

=== Qualifiers ===
1. (Australia) Peter Luczak
2. (United Kingdom) Arvind Parmar
3. (Australia) Nathan Healey
4. (France) Jo-Wilfried Tsonga

=== Lucky loser ===
1. (India) Prakash Amritraj

=== Qualifying draw ===
==== First qualifier ====
First round
1	(Australia) Peter Luczak	6	6
(France) Laurent Recouderc	4	1
(China) Li Zhe	7^{8}	7^{7}
(China) Wang Yu	6^{6}	6^{5}
(China) Zhang Hui	6	2	7
WC	(China) Cui Bin	2	6	5
(China) Gao Wan	0	2
7	(India) Prakash Amritraj	6	6

Second round
1	(Australia) Peter Luczak	6	6
(China) Li Zhe	2	2
(China) Zhang Hui	3	1
7	(India) Prakash Amritraj	6	6

Qualifying competition
1	(Australia) Peter Luczak	6^{2}	6	6
7	(India) Prakash Amritraj	7^{7}	2	2

==== Second qualifier ====
First round
2	(United Kingdom) Arvind Parmar	6	6
WC	(China) Li Jingyi	4	4
(Japan) Yaoki Ishii	6	6
(China) Yang Zengbao	2	4
(China) Wang Yue	0	6^{6}
(Russia) Alexander Kudryavtsev	6	7^{8}
(China) Wu Zhiqiang	0	0
6	(Japan) Tasuku Iwami	6	6

Second round
2	(United Kingdom) Arvind Parmar	6	6
(Japan) Yaoki Ishii	3	0
(Russia) Alexander Kudryavtsev	6	1	7^{7}
6	(Japan) Tasuku Iwami	3	6	6^{5}

Qualifying competition
2	(United Kingdom) Arvind Parmar	6	6
(Russia) Alexander Kudryavtsev	4	1

==== Third qualifier ====
First round
3	(France) Gilles Simon	4	6^{4}
(Australia) Nathan Healey	6	7^{7}
(Japan) Toshihide Matsui	6	6
(China) Cui Miao	3	2
(China) Bai Yang	2	2
WC	(China) Li Xiang	6	6
(China) Xu Ran	1	2
8	(Netherlands) Paul Logtens	6	6

Second round
(Australia) Nathan Healey	6	6
(Japan) Toshihide Matsui	4	3
WC	(China) Li Xiang	3	2
8	(Netherlands) Paul Logtens	6	6

Qualifying competition
(Australia) Nathan Healey	7	6
8	(Netherlands) Paul Logtens	5	4

==== Fourth qualifier ====
First round
4	(United Kingdom) Jamie Delgado	6	6
(China) Yang Wei-Guang	3	0
(Slovenia) Luka Gregorc	6	6
(China) Xu Tian-Yu	1	0
(Puerto Rico) Gabriel Montilla	3	6	6
(Russia) Andrei Merinov	6	2	2
(Russia) Vadim Davletshin	6	4	3
5	(France) Jo-Wilfried Tsonga	2	6	6

Second round
4	(United Kingdom) Jamie Delgado	6	2	4
(Slovenia) Luka Gregorc	1	6	6
(Puerto Rico) Gabriel Montilla	2	4
5	(France) Jo-Wilfried Tsonga	6	6

Qualifying competition
(Slovenia) Luka Gregorc	3	2
5	(France) Jo-Wilfried Tsonga	6	6
