= 2004 China Open – Mixed doubles =

Mixed doubles
- 2004 China Open

Final
- Champions: (United States) Tripp Phillips (Switzerland) Emmanuelle Gagliardi
- Runners-up: (United States) Justin Gimelstob (United States) Jill Craybas
- Score: 6–1, 6–2

Details
- Draw: 16
- Seeds: 4

Events
Singles	men	women
Doubles	men	women	mixed
- China Open

In order to commemorate the first joint edition since 1996, a mixed doubles tournament was held by combining female players of the WTA China Open and the male players of the ATP Beijing Challenger. The tournament had a prize money of US$6,000, but as this was an exhibition tournament, no points were given for the ATP and WTA rankings.

Matches were played at best of three sets with a Match tie-break replacing the final set, in which a pair must win a 10-point tiebreaker (or by a two-point margin) to win the match. Match tie-breaks were not fully implemented until the 2006 season in official tournaments.

Tripp Phillips and Emmanuelle Gagliardi won the title by defeating Justin Gimelstob and Jill Craybas 6–1, 6–2 in the final.

== Seeds ==
1. (United States) Graydon Oliver / (China) Sun Tiantian (first round)
2. (United States) Tripp Phillips / (Switzerland) Emmanuelle Gagliardi (champions)
3. (United States) Justin Gimelstob / (United States) Jill Craybas (final)
4. (Australia) Ashley Fisher / (Australia) Samantha Stosur (second round)

== Draw ==
Key

- Q = Qualifier
- WC = Wild card
- LL = Lucky loser
- Alt = Alternate
- ITF = ITF entry
- PR = Protected ranking
- SR = Special ranking
- SE = Special exempt
- JE = Junior exempt
- JR = Junior Accelerator Programme entrant
- CO = College Accelerator Programme entrant
- NG = Next Gen Accelerator Program entrant
- w/o = Walkover
- r = Retired
- d = Defaulted

=== Draw ===
First round
1	(United States) G Oliver (China) T Sun	5	2
(United States) A Bogomolov Jr. (Russia) D Safina	7	6
(United States) B Coupe (South Africa) K Grant	2	6	[6]
(United States) S Humphries (Spain) A Sánchez Vicario	6	4	[10]
3	(United States) J Gimelstob (United States) J Craybas	6	6
(United States) T Dent (United States) J Hopkins	3	4
(United States) S Huss (Venezuela) M Sequera	7	6
(Japan) Norikazu Sugiyama (Argentina) M Díaz Oliva	5	4
(United States) G Weiner (South Africa) N Grandin	6	6
(China) Y Zhang (China) J Zheng	1	2
(Greece) Niko Karagiannis (Russia) G Voskoboeva	4	2
4	(Australia) A Fisher (Australia) S Stosur	6	6
(United States) J Marshall (Colombia) C Castaño	6	6
(Italy) D Sanguinetti (Italy) An Serra Zanetti	3	1
(Sweden) J Landsberg (Russia) A Jidkova	2	6	[2]
2	(United States) T Phillips (Switzerland) E Gagliardi	6	2	[10]

Second round
(United States) A Bogomolov Jr. (Russia) D Safina
(United States) S Humphries (Spain) A Sánchez Vicario	w/o
3	(United States) J Gimelstob (United States) J Craybas	5	6	[10]
(United States) S Huss (Venezuela) M Sequera	7	3	[8]
(United States) G Weiner (South Africa) N Grandin	6	5	[10]
4	(Australia) A Fisher (Australia) S Stosur	3	7	[6]
(United States) J Marshall (Colombia) C Castaño	4	2
2	(United States) T Phillips (Switzerland) E Gagliardi	6	6

Semifinals
(United States) S Humphries (Spain) A Sánchez Vicario	6	2	[7]
3	(United States) J Gimelstob (United States) J Craybas	4	6	[10]
(United States) G Weiner (South Africa) N Grandin	1	2
2	(United States) T Phillips (Switzerland) E Gagliardi	6	6

Final
3	(United States) J Gimelstob (United States) J Craybas	1	2
2	(United States) T Phillips (Switzerland) E Gagliardi	6	6
