= 2004 China Open – Women's singles =

Women's singles
- 2004 China Open

Final
- Champion: (United States) Serena Williams
- Runner-up: (Russia) Svetlana Kuznetsova
- Score: 4–6, 7–5, 6–4

Details
- Draw: 28 (2WC/4Q)
- Seeds: 8

Events
Singles	men	women
Doubles	men	women	mixed
← 2003 ·	China Open	· 2005 →

Elena Dementieva was the defending champion, but did not participate in this competition.

Serena Williams won in the final 4–6, 7–5, 6–4, against Svetlana Kuznetsova.

== Seeds ==
The top four seeds received a bye into the second round.

1. (United States) Serena Williams (champion)
2. (Russia) Svetlana Kuznetsova (final)
3. (Russia) Maria Sharapova (semifinals)
4. (Russia) Vera Zvonareva (semifinals)
5. (Russia) Nadia Petrova (quarterfinals, retired due to a left ankle sprain)
6. (Argentina) Gisela Dulko (quarterfinals)
7. (Serbia and Montenegro) Jelena Janković (quarterfinals, retired due to an aggravation of a right ankle sprain)
8. (Serbia and Montenegro) Jelena Dokić (first round)

== Draw ==
=== Key ===
- Q = Qualifier
- WC = Wild card
- LL = Lucky loser
- Alt = Alternate
- SE = Special exempt
- PR = Protected ranking
- ITF = ITF entry
- JE = Junior exempt
- w/o = Walkover
- r = Retired
- d = Defaulted
- SR = Special ranking

=== Finals ===
Semifinals
1	(United States) Serena Williams	6	6
4	(Russia) Vera Zvonareva	2	3
3	(Russia) Maria Sharapova	2	2
2	(Russia) Svetlana Kuznetsova	6	6

Final
1	(United States) Serena Williams	4	7	6
2	(Russia) Svetlana Kuznetsova	6	5	4

=== Top half ===
First round
(Russia) D Safina	6	6
WC	(China) Z Yan	3	2
WC	(China) T Sun	4	2
Q	(Croatia) S Mamić	6	6
(China) J Zheng	2	2
5	(Russia) N Petrova	6	6
(Puerto Rico) K Brandi	6	4	3
Q	(Switzerland) E Gagliardi	2	6	6
(Spain) A Medina Garrigues	7	6
(Japan) S Obata	5	1
(Thailand) T Tanasugarn	6	0	6
8	(Serbia and Montenegro) J Dokić	3	6	0

Second round
1	(United States) S Williams	6	3	6
(Russia) D Safina	4	6	3
(Croatia) S Mamić	3	3
5	(Russia) N Petrova	6	6
4	(Russia) V Zvonareva	6	6
(Switzerland) E Gagliardi	2	3
(Spain) A Medina Garrigues	6	6
(Thailand) T Tanasugarn	4	4

Quarterfinals
1	(United States) S Williams	6	4
5	(Russia) N Petrova	2	1	r
4	(Russia) V Zvonareva	6	6
(Spain) A Medina Garrigues	2	3

Semifinals
1	(United States) S Williams	6	6
4	(Russia) V Zvonareva	2	3

=== Bottom half ===
First round
7	(Serbia and Montenegro) J Janković	4	6	7
(Japan) S Asagoe	6	2	6^{5}
Q	(Russia) V Dushevina	2	6	6
(Germany) A Barna	6	2	3
(Russia) T Panova	6
(Slovenia) T Pisnik	0	r
6	(Argentina) G Dulko	6	6
(Hungary) A Kapros	4	1
(Venezuela) M Vento-Kabchi	7	6
(Italy) F Pennetta	6^{5}	4
(Australia) N Pratt	3	2
Q	(China) N Li	6	6

Second round
7	(Serbia and Montenegro) J Janković	6	6
Q	(Russia) V Dushevina	1	3
(Russia) T Panova	1	1
3	(Russia) M Sharapova	6	6
6	(Argentina) G Dulko	6	6
(Venezuela) M Vento-Kabchi	4	4
Q	(China) N Li	3	7	6^{3}
2	(Russia) S Kuznetsova	6	6^{5}	7

Quarterfinals
7	(Serbia and Montenegro) J Janković	2	r
3	(Russia) M Sharapova	5
6	(Argentina) G Dulko	2	4
2	(Russia) S Kuznetsova	6	6

Semifinals
3	(Russia) M Sharapova	2	2
2	(Russia) S Kuznetsova	6	6

== Qualifying ==
=== Seeds ===
1. (United States) Jill Craybas (first round)
2. (Spain) Marta Marrero (second round)
3. (Hungary) ~~Anikó Kapros~~ (moved to the Main Draw)
4. (Germany) ~~Marlene Weingärtner~~ (still competing in Bali)
5. (Russia) Alina Jidkova (second round)
6. (Russia) Vera Dushevina (qualified)
7. (Slovakia) Martina Suchá (first round)
8. (Venezuela) Milagros Sequera (first round)
9. (Australia) Samantha Stosur (qualifying competition)
10. (China) Peng Shuai (first round)

=== Qualifiers ===
1. (Croatia) Sanda Mamić
2. (China) Li Na
3. (Russia) Vera Dushevina
4. (Switzerland) Emmanuelle Gagliardi

=== Qualifying draw ===
==== First qualifier ====
First round
1	(United States) Jill Craybas	6	5	1
(Japan) Yuka Yoshida	1	7	6
(Russia) Lioudmila Skavronskaia	5	6	6
(China) Liu Nannan	7	4	1
(Croatia) Silvija Talaja	3	4
(Croatia) Sanda Mamić	6	6
Alt	(Japan) Rika Fujiwara	6	7
8	(Venezuela) Milagros Sequera	2	5

Second round
(Japan) Yuka Yoshida	7^{7}	1	5
(Russia) Lioudmila Skavronskaia	6^{4}	6	7
(Croatia) Sanda Mamić	6	6
Alt	(Japan) Rika Fujiwara	4	2

Qualifying competition
(Russia) Lioudmila Skavronskaia	2	3
(Croatia) Sanda Mamić	6	6

==== Second qualifier ====
First round
2	(Spain) Marta Marrero	7	6
(Japan) Aiko Nakamura	5	3
WC	(China) Yang Shujing	1	4
(Poland) Marta Domachowska	6	6
WC	(China) Li Na	6	6
(Italy) Antonella Serra Zanetti	1	1
WC	(China) Li Ting	6	6
7	(Slovakia) Martina Suchá	4	2

Second round
2	(Spain) Marta Marrero	1	2
(Poland) Marta Domachowska	6	6
WC	(China) Li Na	6	6
WC	(China) Li Ting	4	4

Qualifying competition
(Poland) Marta Domachowska	1	5
WC	(China) Li Na	6	7

==== Third qualifier ====
First round
9	(Australia) Samantha Stosur	7	6
Alt	(Japan) Seiko Okamoto	5	4
(China) Xie Yanze	1	1
Alt	(Germany) Antonia Matic	6	6
(South Korea) Jeon Mi-ra	7	5	1
(Russia) Galina Voskoboeva	5	7	6
(Argentina) Mariana Díaz Oliva	4	6^{6}
6	(Russia) Vera Dushevina	6	7^{8}

Second round
9	(Australia) Samantha Stosur	5	6	6
Alt	(Germany) Antonia Matic	7	4	2
(Russia) Galina Voskoboeva	4	3
6	(Russia) Vera Dushevina	6	6

Qualifying competition
9	(Australia) Samantha Stosur	3	3
6	(Russia) Vera Dushevina	6	6

==== Fourth qualifier ====
First round
10	(China) Peng Shuai	4	4
(Switzerland) Emmanuelle Gagliardi	6	6
WC	(China) Sun Shengnan	7^{7}	2	2
(Colombia) Catalina Castaño	6^{3}	6	6
(Italy) Adriana Serra Zanetti	1	2
(United States) Jennifer Hopkins	6	6
(United States) Abigail Spears	1	4
5	(Russia) Alina Jidkova	6	6

Second round
(Switzerland) Emmanuelle Gagliardi	6	2	6
(Colombia) Catalina Castaño	2	6	2
(United States) Jennifer Hopkins	5	6	6
5	(Russia) Alina Jidkova	7	4	4

Qualifying competition
(Switzerland) Emmanuelle Gagliardi	6	3	6
(United States) Jennifer Hopkins	2	6	3
