= Huntley Montgomery =

American tennis player

- Country (sports): United States
- Born: October 2, 1978 (age 46)
- Plays: Right-handed
- Prize money: $80,613

Singles
- Career record: 0-0
- Career titles: 0
- Highest ranking: No. 383 (April 14, 2003)

Grand Slam singles results
- US Open: Q1 (1999)

Doubles
- Career record: 0-4
- Career titles: 0
- Highest ranking: No. 98 (October 3, 2005)

Grand Slam doubles results
- Wimbledon: Q1 (2005)
- Last updated on: 3 June 2021.

Huntley Montgomery (born October 2, 1978) is a former professional tennis player from the United States.

== Career ==
Montgomery contested 20 ATP Challenger finals during his career and won nine titles.

He played in four ATP Tour doubles tournaments but was unable to progress past the first round of any of them.

== ATP Challenger and ITF Futures finals ==
=== Singles: 6 (2–4) ===
Legend (singles) ATP Challenger Tour (0–0) ITF World Tennis Tour (2–4)	Finals by surface Hard (2–4) Clay (0–0) Grass (0–0) Carpet (0–0)

Result	W–L	Date	Tournament	Tier	Surface	Opponent	Score
Loss	0–1	Jun 2002	USA F16, Auburn	Futures	Hard	(United States) Mashiska Washington	1–6, 6–7^{(0–7)}
Loss	0–2	Oct 2002	USA F26, Arlington	Futures	Hard	(South Africa) Justin Bower	1–6, 4–6
Win	1–2	Mar 2003	USA F5, Harlingen	Futures	Hard	(Serbia and Montenegro) Dušan Vemić	6–4, 6–7^{(4–7)}, 7–5
Loss	1–3	Jun 2003	Canada F2, Montreal	Futures	Hard	(Canada) Frank Dancevic	4–6, 6–4, 3–6
Win	2–3	Sep 2003	Mexico F13, Celaya	Futures	Hard	(Australia) Domenic Marafiote	6–3, 6–1
Loss	2–4	Sep 2004	USA F24, Claremont	Futures	Hard	(United States) Bobby Reynolds	6–4, 2–6, 3–6

=== Doubles: 41 (22–19) ===
Legend (singles) ATP Challenger Tour (9–11) ITF World Tennis Tour (13–8)	Finals by surface Hard (21–14) Clay (0–4) Grass (1–0) Carpet (0–1)

Result	W–L	Date	Tournament	Tier	Surface	Partner	Opponents	Score
Loss	0–1	Feb 2002	Dallas, United States	Challenger	Hard	(United States) Brian Vahaly	(Canada) Frédéric Niemeyer (Italy) Giorgio Galimberti	6–7^{(1–7)}, 4–6
Win	1–1	Apr 2002	USA F7, Little Rock	Futures	Hard	(United States) Ryan Sachire	(United States) Tripp Phillips (Sweden) Oskar Johansson	7–5, 6–2
Win	2–1	Apr 2002	USA F8, Mobile	Futures	Hard	(United States) Tripp Phillips	(United States) Thomas Blake (United States) Doug Bohaboy	6–3, 3–6, 7–5
Win	3–1	Apr 2002	USA F9, Elkin	Futures	Hard	(United States) Tripp Phillips	(United States) Brian Baker (United States) Rajeev Ram	2–6, 6–4, 6–4
Loss	3–2	May 2002	Rocky Mount, United States	Challenger	Clay	(United States) Brian Vahaly	(The Bahamas) Mark Merklein (United States) Eric Taino	3–6, 4–6
Loss	3–3	Jun 2002	Tallahassee, United States	Challenger	Hard	(United States) Brian Vahaly	(United States) Levar Harper-Griffith (United States) Jeff Williams	3–6, 6–4, 4–6
Win	4–3	Jul 2002	USA F20, Joplin	Futures	Hard	(United States) Ryan Sachire	(United States) Chris Magyary (New Zealand) Daniel Willman	6–7^{(6–8)}, 6–3, 6–2
Win	5–3	Sep 2002	Waco, United States	Challenger	Hard	(United States) Ryan Sachire	(United States) Diego Ayala (United States) Jason Marshall	4–6, 6–2, 7–6^{(7–5)}
Win	6–3	Oct 2002	Fresno, United States	Challenger	Hard	(United States) Tripp Phillips	(Brazil) Daniel Melo (Argentina) Ignacio Hirigoyen	6–4, 6–3
Win	7–3	Oct 2002	USA F25, Lubbock	Futures	Hard	(United States) Tripp Phillips	(Spain) Ferran Ventura-Martell (Spain) Marc Fornell Mestres	6–0, 6–2
Win	8–3	Oct 2002	USA F26, Arlington	Futures	Hard	(United States) Tripp Phillips	(United States) John Paul Fruttero (United States) Jason Marshall	6–0, 6–4
Win	9–3	Nov 2002	USA F27, Hammond	Futures	Hard	(United States) Tripp Phillips	(United States) Brian Baker (United States) Rajeev Ram	6–3, 6–1
Loss	9–4	Dec 2002	USA F30, Laguna Niguel	Futures	Hard	(United States) Brandon Hawk	(United States) Jason Cook (United States) Lester Cook	2–6, 4–6
Win	10–4	Mar 2003	USA F5, Harlingen	Futures	Hard	(South Africa) Raven Klaasen	(Mexico) Bruno Echagaray (United States) Travis Rettenmaier	walkover
Win	11–4	Apr 2003	USA F7, Pensacola	Futures	Hard	(United States) Tripp Phillips	(United States) Paul Goldstein (United States) Kiantki Thomas	6–7^{(6–8)}, 6–4, 7–5
Loss	11–5	Apr 2003	USA F9, Elkin	Futures	Hard	(United States) Tripp Phillips	(Brazil) Josh Goffi (United States) Travis Parrott	6–2, 2–6, 5–7
Loss	11–6	May 2003	Forest Hills, United States	Challenger	Hard	(United States) Tripp Phillips	(United States) Justin Gimelstob (United States) Scott Humphries	6–7^{(1–7)}, 6–3, 4–6
Loss	11–7	May 2003	USA F12, Tampa	Futures	Clay	(United States) Ryan Sachire	(United States) KJ Hippensteel (United States) Ryan Haviland	2–6, 6–7^{(6–8)}
Win	12–7	Jun 2003	Canada F2, Montreal	Futures	Hard	(United States) Ryan Sachire	(United States) Trace Fielding (Canada) Andrew Nisker	6–3, 6–4
Loss	12–8	Jun 2003	Canada F3, Lachine	Futures	Hard	(United States) Ryan Sachire	(United States) Trace Fielding (United States) Keith From	walkover
Win	13–8	Sep 2003	Mexico F14, Querétaro	Futures	Hard	(Mexico) Bruno Echagaray	(Mexico) Alejandro Hernández (Mexico) Santiago González	1–6, 6–1, 7–5
Win	14–8	Sep 2003	Mexico City, Mexico	Challenger	Hard	(United States) Andres Pedroso	(Mexico) Bruno Echagaray (Netherlands Antilles) Jean-Julien Rojer	6–7^{(3–7)}, 7–5, 6–4
Loss	14–9	Oct 2003	USA F28, Lubbock	Futures	Hard	(United States) Ryan Sachire	(United States) Andres Pedroso (Argentina) Nicolás Todero	3–6, 6–7^{(3–7)}
Loss	14–10	Nov 2003	Puebla, Mexico	Challenger	Hard	(United States) Andres Pedroso	(Mexico) Alejandro Hernández (Mexico) Santiago González	4–6, 6–2, 4–6
Loss	14–11	Jan 2004	USA F1, Tampa	Futures	Hard	(United States) Tripp Phillips	(United States) Brian Baker (United States) Rajeev Ram	3–6, 6–3, 2–6
Loss	14–12	May 2004	USA F12, Tampa	Futures	Clay	(United States) Ryan Sachire	(United States) KJ Hippensteel (United States) Ryan Haviland	6–3, 4–6, 2–6
Win	15–12	Jun 2004	Canada F3, Montreal	Futures	Hard	(United States) Ryan Sachire	(United States) Cary Franklin (Canada) Dejan Cvetkovic	6–3, 6–7^{(6–8)}, 6–4
Win	16–12	Jun 2004	Canada F4, Lachine	Futures	Hard	(United States) Ryan Sachire	(United States) Nicholas Monroe (Nigeria) Jonathan Igbinovia	6–0, 7–5
Win	17–12	Jul 2004	Aptos, United States	Challenger	Hard	(United States) Tripp Phillips	(United States) Diego Ayala (United States) Eric Taino	7–6^{(7–3)}, 7–5
Win	18–12	Aug 2004	Binghamton, United States	Challenger	Hard	(United States) Tripp Phillips	(Australia) Nathan Healey (South Africa) Rik de Voest	7–6^{(8–6)}, 7–6^{(7–4)}
Win	19–12	Aug 2004	Bronx, United States	Challenger	Hard	(United States) Tripp Phillips	(Russia) Igor Kunitsyn (Italy) Uros Vico	7–6^{(8–6)}, 6–7^{(8–10)}, 6–2
Loss	19–13	Sep 2004	USA F24, Claremont	Futures	Hard	(United States) Bobby Reynolds	(United States) Nick Rainey (United States) Brian Wilson	4–6, 4–6
Loss	19–14	Nov 2004	Homestead, United States	Challenger	Hard	(United States) Tripp Phillips	(United States) Glenn Weiner (Romania) Gabriel Trifu	7–5, 5–7, 2–6
Loss	19–15	Dec 2004	Milan, Italy	Challenger	Carpet	(United States) Jason Marshall	(Italy) Daniele Bracciali (Austria) Julian Knowle	3–6, 2–6
Loss	19–16	Feb 2005	Wrocław, Poland	Challenger	Hard	(United States) Jason Marshall	(Czech Republic) Martin Štěpánek (Czech Republic) Lukáš Dlouhý	2–6, 7–5, 4–6
Win	20–16	Feb 2005	Besançon, France	Challenger	Hard	(United States) Jason Marshall	(Slovakia) Michal Mertiňák (Switzerland) Jean-Claude Scherrer	6–7^{(7–9)}, 6–2, 6–3
Loss	20–17	Apr 2005	León, Mexico	Challenger	Hard	(United States) Jason Marshall	(The Bahamas) Mark Merklein (South Africa) Jeff Coetzee	4–6, 6–4, 3–6
Loss	20–18	May 2005	Forest Hills, United States	Challenger	Clay	(United States) Jason Marshall	(The Bahamas) Mark Merklein (Australia) Nathan Healey	6–2, 6–7^{(5–7)}, 4–6
Win	21–18	Jul 2005	Forest Hills 2, United States	Challenger	Grass	(United Kingdom) Richard Barker	(South Africa) Rik de Voest (Australia) Nathan Healey	3–6, 7–5, 7–6^{(8–6)}
Loss	21–19	Aug 2005	Vancouver, Canada	Challenger	Hard	(United States) Rajeev Ram	(Australia) Ashley Fisher (United States) Tripp Phillips	6–7^{(6–8)}, 6–1, 3–6
Win	22–19	Aug 2005	Binghamton, United States	Challenger	Hard	(United States) Tripp Phillips	(United States) Alex Bogomolov Jr. (United States) Travis Rettenmaier	6–3, 6–2
