= 2004 China Open (tennis) =

- Date: Men: 13–19 September; Women: 20–26 September; Mixed: 22–25 September
- Edition: 6th
- Category: ATP International Series; WTA Tier II
- Prize money: Men: USD500,000; Women: USD585,000; Mixed: USD6,000
- Surface: Hard, outdoor
- Location: Beijing, China
- Venue: Beijing Tennis Center

Champions

Men's singles
- (Russia) Marat Safin

Women's singles
- (United States) Serena Williams

Men's doubles
- (United States) Justin Gimelstob / (United States) Graydon Oliver

Women's doubles
- (Switzerland) Emmanuelle Gagliardi / (Russia) Dinara Safina

Mixed doubles
- (United States) Tripp Phillips / (Switzerland) Emmanuelle Gagliardi
- China Open

The 2004 China Open was a tennis tournament played on outdoor hard courts. It is the 6th edition of the China Open, and is part of the International Series of the 2004 ATP Tour, and of the Tier II of the 2004 WTA Tour. Both the men's and the women's events are held at the Beijing Tennis Center in Beijing, People's Republic of China. The men's event took place from 13 to 19 September 2004, while the women's took place the following week from 20 to 26 September 2004.

Additionally, a mixed doubles tournament was held from 22 to 25 September 2004, although it counted only as an exhibition tournament and, therefore, no points were given for the ATP and WTA rankings.

== Finals ==
=== Men's singles ===
(Russia) Marat Safin defeated (Russia) Mikhail Youzhny, 7–6^{(7–4)}, 7–5

=== Women's singles ===
(United States) Serena Williams defeated (Russia) Svetlana Kuznetsova, 4–6, 7–5, 6–4

=== Men's doubles ===
(United States) Justin Gimelstob / (United States) Graydon Oliver defeated (United States) Alex Bogomolov Jr. / (United States) Taylor Dent, 4–6, 6–4, 7–6^{(8–6)}

=== Women's doubles ===
(Switzerland) Emmanuelle Gagliardi / (Russia) Dinara Safina defeated (Argentina) Gisela Dulko / (Venezuela) María Vento-Kabchi, 6–4, 6–4

=== Mixed doubles ===
(United States) Tripp Phillips / (Switzerland) Emmanuelle Gagliardi defeated (United States) Justin Gimelstob / (United States) Jill Craybas, 6–1, 6–2
