= Lu Hao =

Lu Hao may refer to:

- Lu Hao (politician, born 1947), Chinese politician, former governor of Gansu
- Lu Hao (politician, born 1967), Chinese politician, Minister of Natural Resources and former governor of Heilongjiang
- Lu Hao (tennis) (born 1984), Chinese tennis player
