= Tripp Phillips =

American tennis player and coach (born 1977)

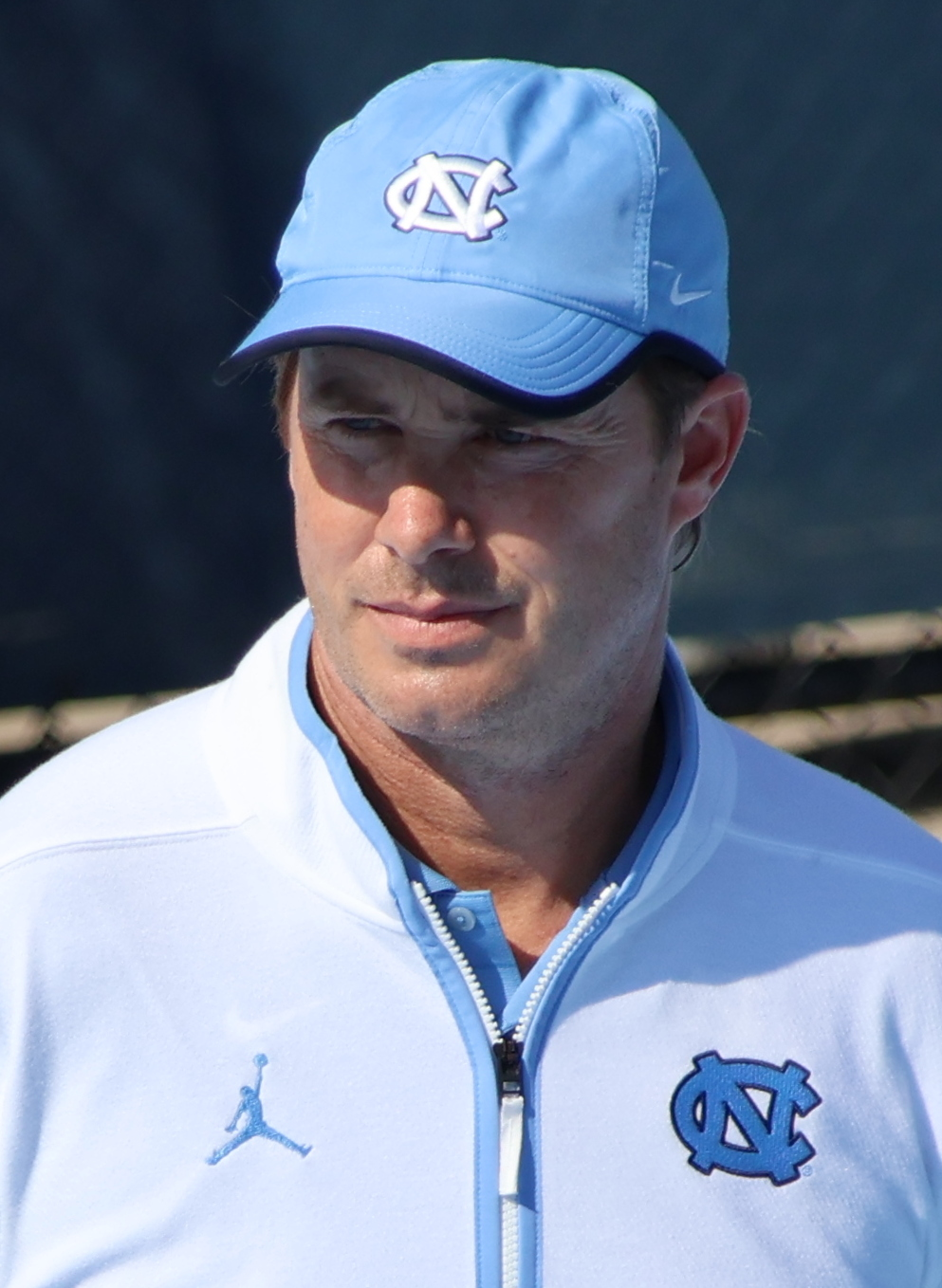
- Phillips with North Carolina in 2026
- Country (sports): United States
- Residence: Chapel Hill, North Carolina, U.S.
- Born: August 27, 1977 (age 49) Newport News, Virginia, U.S.
- Height: 1.85 m (6 ft 1 in)
- Turned pro: 2001
- Plays: Right-handed
- Prize money: US$311,162

Singles
- Career record: 0–1
- Career titles: 0; 0 Challenger, 1 Futures
- Highest ranking: 343 (May 19, 2003)

Doubles
- Career record: 43–53
- Career titles: 2; 15 Challenger, 13 Futures
- Highest ranking: 29 (October 9, 2006)

Grand Slam doubles results
- Australian Open: 2R (2007)
- French Open: 1R (2006, 2007)
- Wimbledon: 2R (2006)
- US Open: SF (2006)

Mixed doubles
- Career record: 4–1
- Career titles: 1 (China '04)

Grand Slam mixed doubles results
- Wimbledon: 1R (2007)
- Last updated on: 30 April 2021.

Owen Thomas "Tripp" Phillips III (born August 26, 1977) is an American tennis coach and former professional player who is the associate head coach of the North Carolina Tar Heels men's tennis team.

== Early life ==
Phillips was born in Newport News, Virginia. He started to play tennis at the age of four with his mother Brenda and father O.T. When he was 16, he was among the top 10 in America in boy's 16–18.

He attended Charlotte Country Day School and then the University of North Carolina at Chapel Hill, where he majored in sports science and was an All-American tennis player his senior year.

== Playing career ==
He won two ATP doubles titles in his career. The first was in Tokyo, Japan on October 2, 2006, when he and his partner, Ashley Fisher defeated American duo Paul Goldstein and Jim Thomas in straight sets, 6–2, 7–5. The second was at the 2008 Indianapolis Tennis Championships when he and Fisher defeated Scott Lipsky and David Martin, 6–3, 3–6, 10–5.

Also, he has won several ITF circuit challengers with Fisher and also in Atlantic City with his partner Ryan Sachire. In 2006 he partnered with Rogier Wassen to win the doubles title at an ITF challenger event in Mexico City.

In 2004, he played his only singles match at the ATP World Tour level. It came at the Franklin Templeton Tennis Classic in Scottsdale, Arizona, and he lost to compatriot Robby Ginepri in the first round, 6–2, 6–0.

In 2008, he paired with K. J. Hippensteel to win two matches in doubles qualifying and make the main draw at Wimbledon. They then lost in the first round of the main draw to Ross Hutchins and Stephen Huss, 6–3, 6–7(5), 7–5, 6–2.

== Coaching career ==
Phillips became an assistant coach for the North Carolina Tar Heels under head coach Sam Paul in 2006. He was promoted to associate head coach in 2013.

== Personal life ==
Phillips is married to Laura Zuger and has two sons.

== ATP Tour career finals ==
=== Doubles: 2 (2 titles) ===
Legend Grand Slam tournaments (0–0) ATP World Tour Finals (0–0) ATP World Tour Masters 1000 (0–0) ATP World Tour 500 Series (1–0) ATP World Tour 250 Series (1–0)	Finals by surface Hard (2–0) Clay (0–0) Grass (0–0) Carpet (0–0)	Finals by setting Outdoor (0–0) Indoor (0–0)

Result	W–L	Date	Tournament	Tier	Surface	Partner	Opponents	Score
Win	1–0	Oct 2006	Japan Open, Japan	500 Series	Hard	(Australia) Ashley Fisher	(United States) Paul Goldstein (United States) Jim Thomas	6–2, 7–5
Win	2–0	Jul 2008	Indianapolis, United States	250 Series	Hard	(Australia) Ashley Fisher	(United States) Scott Lipsky (United States) David Martin	3–6, 6–3, [10–5]

=== Mixed doubles ===
Result	W–L	Date	Tournament	Tier	Surface	Partner	Opponents	Score
Win	1–0	Sep 2004	Beijing, China	Challenger	Hard	(Switzerland) Emmanuelle Gagliardi	(United States) Justin Gimelstob (United States) Jill Craybas	6–1, 6–2

== ATP Challenger and ITF Futures finals ==
=== Singles: 3 (1–2) ===
Legend ATP Challenger (0–0) ITF Futures (1–2)	Finals by surface Hard (1–2) Clay (0–0) Grass (0–0) Carpet (0–0)

Result	W–L	Date	Tournament	Tier	Surface	Opponent	Score
Win	1–9	Apr 2002	USA F8 Mobile	Futures	Hard	(North Macedonia) Lazar Magdinchev	2–6, 6–2, 6–2
Loss	1–1	Nov 2002	USA F27 Hammond	Futures	Hard	(United States) Michael Joyce	6–7^{(8–10)}, 6–7^{(1–7)}
Loss	1–2	Apr 2003	USA F9 Elkin	Futures	Hard	(Brazil) Josh Goffi	6–4, 2–6, 4–6

=== Doubles: 43 (28–15) ===
Legend ATP Challenger (15–8) ITF Futures (13–7)	Finals by surface Hard (26–13) Clay (2–2) Grass (0–0) Carpet (0–0)

Result	W–L	Date	Tournament	Tier	Surface	Partner	Opponents	Score
Loss	0–1	Feb 2001	Mexico F1, Chetumal	Futures	Hard	(Canada) Andrew Nisker	(Czech Republic) Josef Neštický (Czech Republic) Jiri Vrbka	4–6, 2–6
Win	1–1	Feb 2001	Mexico F2, Cancún	Futures	Hard	(Canada) Andrew Nisker	(Mexico) Dimitrio Martinez-Castro (Mexico) Jacobo Hernandez	4–6, 6–4, 6–1
Loss	1–2	May 2001	USA F11, Vero Beach	Futures	Clay	(United States) Jeff Laski	(Sweden) Daniel Andersson (United States) Ryan Sachire	4–6, 6–7^{(4–7)}
Win	2–2	Jun 2001	Canada F1, Mississauga	Futures	Hard	(Canada) Andrew Nisker	(United States) Steve Berke (United States) Kyle Porter	3–6, 7–6^{(7–4)}, 6–1
Loss	2–3	Jun 2001	Canada F2, Montreal	Futures	Hard	(Canada) Andrew Nisker	(Canada) Bobby Kokavec (Canada) Nicolas Brochu	2–6, 4–6
Win	3–3	Nov 2001	USA F24, Hattiesburg	Futures	Hard	(Canada) Andrew Nisker	(India) Vikrant Chadha (United States) Ryan Sachire	4–6, 7–6^{(7–5)}, 6–3
Loss	3–4	Mar 2002	New Zealand F2, Christchurch	Futures	Hard	(United States) Doug Root	(South Africa) Dirk Stegmann (South Africa) Johan Du Randt	6–7^{(2–7)}, 6–2, 4–6
Loss	3–5	Apr 2002	USA F7, Little Rock	Futures	Hard	(Sweden) Oskar Johansson	(United States) Huntley Montgomery (United States) Ryan Sachire	5–7, 2–6
Win	4–5	Apr 2002	USA F8, Mobile	Futures	Hard	(United States) Huntley Montgomery	(United States) Doug Bohaboy (United States) Thomas Blake	6–3, 2–6, 7–5
Win	5–5	Apr 2002	USA F9, Elkin	Futures	Hard	(United States) Huntley Montgomery	(United States) Rajeev Ram (United States) Brian Baker	2–6, 6–4, 6–4
Win	6–5	Oct 2002	Fresno, United States	Challenger	Hard	(United States) Huntley Montgomery	(Argentina) Ignacio Hirigoyen (Brazil) Daniel Melo	6–4, 6–3
Win	7–5	Oct 2002	USA F25, Lubbock	Futures	Hard	(United States) Huntley Montgomery	(Spain) F Ventura-Martell (Spain) Marc Fornell Mestres	6–0, 6–2
Win	8–5	Oct 2002	USA F26, Arlington	Futures	Hard	(United States) Huntley Montgomery	(United States) John Paul Fruttero (United States) Jason Marshall	6–0, 6–4
Win	9–5	Nov 2002	USA F27, Hammond	Futures	Hard	(United States) Huntley Montgomery	(United States) Rajeev Ram (United States) Brian Baker	6–3, 6–1
Win	10–5	Jan 2003	USA F2, Kissimmee	Futures	Hard	(Argentina) Ignacio Hirigoyen	(Chile) Felipe Parada (Chile) Julio Peralta	6–4, 6–2
Win	11–5	Feb 2003	USA F3, Aventura	Futures	Hard	(United States) Ryan Sachire	(Chile) Felipe Parada (Chile) Julio Peralta	walkover
Win	12–5	Feb 2003	USA F4, Brownsville	Futures	Hard	(United States) Ryan Sachire	(North Macedonia) Lazar Magdinchev (Serbia and Montenegro) Dušan Vemić	6–2, 6–1
Win	13–5	Apr 2003	USA F7, Pensacola	Futures	Hard	(United States) Huntley Montgomery	(United States) Paul Goldstein (United States) Kiantki Thomas	6–7^{(6–8)}, 6–4, 7–5
Loss	13–6	Apr 2003	USA F9, Elkin	Futures	Hard	(United States) Huntley Montgomery	(United States) Travis Parrott (Brazil) Josh Goffi	6–2, 2–6, 5–7
Loss	13–7	May 2003	Forest Hills, United States	Challenger	Hard	(United States) Huntley Montgomery	(United States) Justin Gimelstob (United States) Scott Humphries	6–7^{(1–7)}, 6–3, 4–6
Win	14–7	Jun 2003	Atlantic City, United States	Challenger	Hard	(United States) Ryan Sachire	(United States) Paul Goldstein (United States) Brandon Coupe	7–5, 6–3
Loss	14–8	Jul 2003	Valladolid, Spain	Challenger	Hard	(Russia) Philipp Mukhometov	(Japan) Jun Kato (Poland) Łukasz Kubot	6–4, 0–6, 1–6
Win	15–8	Aug 2003	Segovia, Spain	Challenger	Hard	(Czech Republic) Ota Fukárek	(Spain) Emilio Benfele Álvarez (France) Jean-François Bachelot	6–4, 7–6^{(10–8)}
Loss	15–9	Nov 2003	Austin, United States	Challenger	Hard	(Brazil) Josh Goffi	(Chinese Taipei) Lu Yen-hsun (United States) Jason Marshall	2–6, 6–2, 3–6
Loss	15–10	Jan 2004	USA F1, Tampa	Futures	Hard	(United States) Huntley Montgomery	(United States) Rajeev Ram (United States) Brian Baker	3–6, 6–3, 2–6
Win	16–10	Jan 2004	USA F2, Kissimmee	Futures	Hard	(United States) Ryan Sachire	(United States) Scott Lipsky (United States) David Martin	6–4, 1–6, 6–3
Win	17–10	Mar 2004	Mexico City, Mexico	Challenger	Clay	(Australia) Ashley Fisher	(Netherlands) Rogier Wassen (Argentina) Federico Browne	6–4, 2–6, 6–3
Loss	17–11	Apr 2004	Leon, Mexico	Challenger	Hard	(Canada) Frédéric Niemeyer	(Mexico) Bruno Echagaray (Mexico) Miguel Gallardo Valles	4–6, 6–7^{(1–7)}
Loss	17–12	Jun 2004	Prostějov, Czech Republic	Challenger	Clay	(United States) Travis Parrott	(Slovakia) Dominik Hrbatý (Czech Republic) Jaroslav Levinský	4–6, 4–6
Win	18–12	Jul 2004	Córdoba, Spain	Challenger	Hard	(United States) Brandon Coupe	(Brazil) Josh Goffi (Spain) Emilio Benfele Álvarez	7–6^{(8–6)}, 7–6^{(7–1)}
Win	19–12	Jul 2004	Aptos, United States	Challenger	Hard	(United States) Huntley Montgomery	(United States) Diego Ayala (United States) Eric Taino	7–6^{(7–3)}, 7–5
Win	20–12	Aug 2004	Binghamton, United States	Challenger	Hard	(United States) Huntley Montgomery	(Australia) Nathan Healey (South Africa) Rik de Voest	7–6^{(8–6)}, 7–6^{(7–4)}
Win	21–12	Aug 2004	Bronx, United States	Challenger	Hard	(United States) Huntley Montgomery	(Russia) Igor Kunitsyn (Italy) Uros Vico	7–6^{(8–6)}, 6–7^{(8–10)}, 6–2
Win	22–12	Sep 2004	Neijing, China	Challenger	Hard	(Australia) Ashley Fisher	(United States) Justin Gimelstob (United Kingdom) Graydon Oliver	7–5, 7–5
Loss	22–13	Nov 2004	Homestead, United States	Challenger	Hard	(United States) Huntley Montgomery	(Romania) Gabriel Trifu (United States) Glenn Weiner	7–5, 5–7, 2–6
Win	23–13	Aug 2005	Vancouver, Canada	Challenger	Hard	(Australia) Ashley Fisher	(United States) Rajeev Ram (United States) Huntley Montgomery	7–6^{(8–6)}, 1–6, 6–3
Win	24–13	Aug 2005	Binghamton, United States	Challenger	Hard	(United States) Huntley Montgomery	(United States) Alex Bogomolov Jr. (United States) Travis Rettenmaier	6–3, 6–2
Loss	24–14	Oct 2005	Southampton, Great Britain	Challenger	Hard	(United States) Travis Parrott	(Netherlands) Rogier Wassen (South Africa) Jeff Coetzee	7–6^{(10–8)}, 4–6, [4–10]
Win	25–14	Nov 2005	Busan 2, South Korea	Challenger	Hard	(Australia) Ashley Fisher	(Thailand) Sonchat Ratiwatana (Thailand) Sanchai Ratiwatana	7–5, 6–3
Win	26–14	Nov 2005	Champaign-Urbana, United States	Challenger	Hard	(Australia) Ashley Fisher	(United States) Justin Gimelstob (United States) Rajeev Ram	6–3, 5–7, 6–0
Win	27–14	Dec 2005	Orlando, United States	Challenger	Hard	(Australia) Ashley Fisher	(Germany) Mischa Zverev (United States) Alex Kuznetsov	default
Win	28–14	Mar 2006	Mexico City, Mexico	Challenger	Clay	(Netherlands) Rogier Wassen	(Germany) Alexander Waske (Germany) Michael Kohlmann	6–7^{(4–7)}, 6–4, [13–11]
Loss	28–15	Apr 2006	Tallahassee, United States	Challenger	Hard	(United States) Bobby Reynolds	(South Africa) Rik de Voest (United States) Glenn Weiner	6–3, 3–6, 0–1 ret.

== Grand Slam doubles performance timeline ==
Key
W	F	SF	QF	#R	RR	Q#	DNQ	A	NH

(W) winner; (F) finalist; (SF) semifinalist; (QF) quarterfinalist; (#R) rounds 4, 3, 2, 1; (RR) round-robin stage; (Q#) qualification round; (DNQ) did not qualify; (A) absent; (NH) not held; (SR) strike rate (events won / competed); (W–L) win–loss record.

Tournament	2004	2005	2006	2007	2008	SR	W–L	Win%
Australian Open	A	1R	A	2R	A	0 / 2	1–2	33%
French Open	A	A	1R	1R	A	0 / 2	0–2	0%
Wimbledon	1R	Q1	2R	1R	1R	0 / 4	1–4	20%
US Open	A	A	SF	3R	A	0 / 2	6–2	75%
Win–loss	0–1	0–1	5–3	3–4	0–1	0 / 10	8–10	44%
