= 2004 China Open – Women's doubles =

Women's doubles
- 2004 China Open

Final
- Champions: (Switzerland) Emmanuelle Gagliardi (Russia) Dinara Safina
- Runners-up: (Argentina) Gisela Dulko (Venezuela) María Vento-Kabchi
- Score: 6–4, 6–4

Details
- Draw: 16 (2WC/1Q)
- Seeds: 4

Events
Singles	men	women
Doubles	men	women	mixed
← 2003 ·	China Open	· 2005 →

The tournament was moved from Shanghai to Beijing in 2004. Last champions in Shanghai were Émilie Loit and Nicole Pratt. Pratt teamed up with Tamarine Tanasugarn but they were eliminated in semifinals.

Emmanuelle Gagliardi and Dinara Safina won the title by defeating Gisela Dulko and María Vento-Kabchi 6–4, 6–4 in the final.

== Seeds ==
1. (Australia) Nicole Pratt / (Thailand) Tamarine Tanasugarn (semifinals)
2. (China) Li Ting / (China) Sun Tiantian (semifinals)
3. (Russia) Maria Sharapova / (Russia) Vera Zvonareva (first round)
4. (China) Yan Zi / (China) Zheng Jie (quarterfinals)

== Draw ==
=== Key ===
- Q = Qualifier
- WC = Wild card
- LL = Lucky loser
- Alt = Alternate
- SE = Special exempt
- PR = Protected ranking
- ITF = ITF entry
- JE = Junior exempt
- w/o = Walkover
- r = Retired
- d = Defaulted
- SR = Special ranking

=== Draw ===
First round
1	(Australia) N Pratt (Thailand) T Tanasugarn	6	7^{7}
(Venezuela) M Sequera (Australia) S Stosur	2	6^{3}
(Spain) A Medina Garrigues (Italy) F Pennetta	6	6^{7}	6
Q	(South Africa) N Grandin (Germany) A Matic	4	7^{9}	1
4	(China) Z Yan (China) J Zheng	6	7^{8}
(Russia) A Jidkova (United States) A Spears	3	6^{6}
(Argentina) G Dulko (Venezuela) M Vento-Kabchi	6	6
(United States) J Craybas (Germany) M Weingärtner	2	4
(Switzerland) E Gagliardi (Russia) D Safina	6	6
(Spain) M Marrero (Croatia) S Talaja	2	3
(Japan) S Asagoe (Japan) R Fujiwara	1	6	6
3	(Russia) M Sharapova (Russia) V Zvonareva	6	3	4
WC	(Serbia and Montenegro) J Dokic (Serbia and Montenegro) J Janković	6	4	6^{3}
WC	(China) S Peng (China) Y Xie	4	6	7^{7}
(United States) J Hopkins (Chinese Taipei) J Lee	2	2
2	(China) T Li (China) T Sun	6	6

Quarterfinals
1	(Australia) N Pratt (Thailand) T Tanasugarn	6	6
(Spain) A Medina Garrigues (Italy) F Pennetta	2	2
4	(China) Z Yan (China) J Zheng	2	5
(Argentina) G Dulko (Venezuela) M Vento-Kabchi	6	7
(Switzerland) E Gagliardi (Russia) D Safina	6	6
(Japan) S Asagoe (Japan) R Fujiwara	3	4
WC	(China) S Peng (China) Y Xie	4	2
2	(China) T Li (China) T Sun	6	6

Semifinals
1	(Australia) N Pratt (Thailand) T Tanasugarn	4	4
(Argentina) G Dulko (Venezuela) M Vento-Kabchi	6	6
(Switzerland) E Gagliardi (Russia) D Safina	4	6	6
2	(China) T Li (China) T Sun	6	1	0

Final
(Argentina) G Dulko (Venezuela) M Vento-Kabchi	4	4
(Switzerland) E Gagliardi (Russia) D Safina	6	6

== Qualifying ==
=== Seeds ===
1. (Italy) Adriana Serra Zanetti / (Italy) Antonella Serra Zanetti (qualifying competition)
2. (South Africa) Natalie Grandin / (Germany) Antonia Matic (qualified)

=== Qualifiers ===
1. (South Africa) Natalie Grandin / (Germany) Antonia Matic

=== Qualifying draw ===
First round
1	(Italy) Adriana Serra Zanetti (Italy) Antonella Serra Zanetti	8
(Russia) Tatiana Panova (Russia) Galina Voskoboeva	3
WC	(China) Yang Shujing (China) Yu Ying	4
2	(South Africa) Natalie Grandin (Germany) Antonia Matic	8

Qualifying competition
1	(Italy) Adriana Serra Zanetti (Italy) Antonella Serra Zanetti	5	1
2	(South Africa) Natalie Grandin (Germany) Antonia Matic	7	6
