= Brian Vahaly =

American tennis player

- Country (sports): United States
- Residence: Washington DC. United States
- Born: July 19, 1979 (age 47) Camden, New Jersey, United States
- Height: 6 ft 0 in (1.83 m)
- Turned pro: 2001
- Retired: 2007
- Plays: Right-handed (two-handed backhand)
- Prize money: $1,975,775

Singles
- Career record: 21-43
- Career titles: 0
- Highest ranking: No. 57 (17 March 2003)

Grand Slam singles results
- Australian Open: 2R (2003, 2004)
- French Open: 1R (2003)
- Wimbledon: 2R (2003)
- US Open: 2R (2002, 2003)

Doubles
- Career record: 16–17
- Career titles: 0
- Highest ranking: No. 94 (15 September 2003)

Grand Slam doubles results
- French Open: 2R (2003)
- Wimbledon: 1R (2004)
- US Open: Q1 (2000)

Mixed doubles
- Career record: 0–1
- Career titles: 0

Grand Slam mixed doubles results
- US Open: 1R (2003)
- Last updated on: 29 July 2023.

Brian Vahaly (born July 19, 1979) is an American former professional tennis player and a graduate of University of Virginia. He reached the quarterfinals of the 2003 Indian Wells Masters (defeating world no. 1 Juan Carlos Ferrero en route) and achieved a career-high of world no. 57 in March 2003. He is currently the Chairman of the Board and President of the USTA.

== Early career ==
He began playing tennis at the age of two with his parents Barry and Karen. As a junior, Brian Vahaly captured the Easter Bowl 18s title and reached the final of the Coffee Bowl in Costa Rica in 1997. His best junior Grand Slam result was reaching the quarterfinal at Wimbledon that same year, where he finished 17th in the world junior rankings.

Vahaly proceeded to play four years of collegiate tennis at the University of Virginia from 1998 to 2001, where he was a three-time All-American and finished as the school's most successful player. In 2000, he won the United States Amateur Championships (Men's Tennis). In 2001, Vahaly reached the singles final at the NCAA Championships, and lost in the doubles semifinal with Huntley Montgomery, but finished as the no. 1 player in doubles and no. 5 in singles (40-6).

Vahaly became UVA's first tennis All-American in 1999 and during the previous season was named the Atlantic Coast Conference Rookie of Year. In his last two seasons, he was a two-time ACC Player of Year, and as a senior, he was named the University of Virginia Male Athlete of Year. He graduated with two majors in Finance and Business Management, and finished his career at Virginia as an Academic All-American. He was inducted into the Hall of Fame of University of Virginia Men's Tennis.

== Professional career ==
In 2002, Vahaly enjoyed a breakthrough season on the ATP circuit, advancing to the semifinals of Memphis (falling to Andy Roddick) and the quarterfinals of Indian Wells. He defeated three top 10 ranked players Fernando González, (2003 French Open Champion and former world no. 1) Juan Carlos Ferrero, and Tommy Robredo at Indian Wells and later teamed with Andy Roddick in Washington, D.C., to defeat the no. 1 ranked doubles team of Bob and Mike Bryan. During the year he also posted wins over Michael Chang and Vince Spadea. Vahaly was the only college graduate in the top 100 in the world and was recognized by People magazine in its issue of the 25 Hottest Bachelors. In March 2003, he reached his career high singles ranking of world no. 57.

In 2004-2007, Vahaly spent most of the year on the ATP circuit playing events in Indianapolis, Los Angeles, Newport, Houston, Indian Wells, San Jose, Adelaide, and the Australian Open (losing to finalist Marat Safin).

Vahaly played his last tournament at the U.S. Open losing to Juan Martín del Potro. After the tournament, Vahaly revealed that the shoulder injury had plagued him for some time. On September 7, 2007, Brian underwent surgery to repair several tears to his right rotator cuff. He had two additional surgeries later that year.

== Retirement ==
In November 2007, Vahaly announced his retirement from professional tennis on his website. He had three shoulder surgeries from 2006 to 2007. He moved to Washington, D.C., to work for a private equity fund. In 2013, Vahaly began serving on the USTA board of directors and then became the chief operating officer at two different venture capital firms, Venturehouse Group and NextGen Venture Partners. Vahaly has recently elected to serve as the Chairman of the Board and President of the USTA and US Open for the 2025-2026 term, and was nominated to serve as the Interim Co-CEO during the term for 15 months. He is also currently as Senior Advisor at Brown Advisory, and the Board of Directors for the International Tennis Integrity Agency and the Washington National Cathedral.

== Personal life ==
Vahaly came out as gay in 2017 in a podcast. He is married to Bill Jones, with whom he is raising two twin boys. He is one of very few out male professional tennis players, and the first gay man to publicly come out after playing on the ATP Tour.

== ATP Challenger and ITF Futures finals ==
=== Singles: 15 (10–5) ===
Legend ATP Challenger (5–4) ITF Futures (5–1)	Finals by surface Hard (9–4) Clay (1–1) Grass (0–0) Carpet (0–0)

Result	W–L	Date	Tournament	Tier	Surface	Opponent	Score
Win	1–0	Jul 2001	USA F17-A, Quogue	Futures	Clay	(Germany) Bjorn Jacob	5–7, 6–3, 6–2
Loss	1–1	Jul 2001	USA F17-B, Pittsburgh	Futures	Clay	(Australia) Jaymon Crabb	3–6, 6–1, 4–6
Win	2–1	Oct 2001	Jamaica F1-A, Montego Bay	Futures	Hard	(France) Julien Cassaigne	3–6, 6–1, 6–0
Win	3–1	Oct 2001	Jamaica F1, Negril	Futures	Hard	(New Zealand) Daniel Willman	7–6^{(7–4)}, 6–3
Win	4–1	Dec 2001	USA F28, Laguna Niguel	Futures	Hard	(Republic of Ireland) John Doran	7–6^{(7–3)}, 6–2
Win	5–1	Feb 2002	USA F4, Brownsville	Futures	Hard	(Argentina) Nicolas Todero	6–3, 7–6^{(7–5)}
Win	6–1	Mar 2002	Hamilton, New Zealand	Challenger	Hard	(South Africa) Louis Vosloo	6–2, 5–7, 6–4
Loss	6–2	Apr 2002	Tarzana, United States	Challenger	Hard	(Philippines) Eric Taino	2–6, 6–7^{(6–8)}
Win	7–2	Jun 2002	Tallahassee, United States	Challenger	Hard	(United States) Justin Gimelstob	7–6^{(7–5)}, 6–4
Win	8–2	Jul 2002	Aptos, United States	Challenger	Hard	(Israel) Noam Behr	2–6, 6–3, 6–2
Loss	8–3	Nov 2003	Champaign-Urbana, United States	Challenger	Hard	(United States) Paul Goldstein	3–6, 1–6
Loss	8–4	Oct 2004	College Station, United States	Challenger	Hard	(Brazil) Andre Sa	3–6, 0–6
Win	9–4	Apr 2005	Tallahassee, United States	Challenger	Hard	(United States) Justin Gimelstob	6–4, 6–0
Loss	9–5	Aug 2005	Bronx, United States	Challenger	Hard	(France) Thierry Ascione	2–6, 3–6
Win	10–5	Oct 2005	Calabasas, United States	Challenger	Hard	(Germany) Denis Gremelmayr	3–6, 6–2, 6–2

=== Doubles: 7 (3–4) ===
Legend ATP Challenger (3–4) ITF Futures (0–0)	Finals by surface Hard (3–3) Clay (0–1) Grass (0–0) Carpet (0–0)

Result	W–L	Date	Tournament	Tier	Surface	Partner	Opponents	Score
Loss	0–1	Feb 2002	Dallas, United States	Challenger	Hard	(United States) Huntley Montgomery	(Italy) Giorgio Galimberti (Canada) Frederic Niemeyer	6–7^{(1–7)}, 4–6
Loss	0–2	May 2002	Rocky Mount, United States	Challenger	Clay	(United States) Huntley Montgomery	(The Bahamas) Mark Merklein (Philippines) Eric Taino	3–6, 4–6
Loss	0–3	Jun 2002	Tallahassee, United States	Challenger	Hard	(United States) Huntley Montgomery	(United States) Levar Harper-Griffith (United States) Jeff Williams	3–6, 6–4, 4–6
Win	1–3	Feb 2004	Waikoloa, United States	Challenger	Hard	(United States) Scott Humphries	(United States) Brandon Coupe (United States) Travis Parrott	6–3, 7–6^{(7–3)}
Win	2–3	Oct 2004	College Station, United States	Challenger	Hard	(United States) Paul Goldstein	(Brazil) Andre Sa (Brazil) Bruno Soares	7–5, 2–6, 6–4
Loss	2–4	Oct 2004	Austin, United States	Challenger	Hard	(United States) Robert Kendrick	(Brazil) Andre Sa (Brazil) Bruno Soares	3–6, 1–6
Win	3–5	Aug 2005	Bronx, United States	Challenger	Hard	(Philippines) Cecil Mamiit	(France) Julien Benneteau (France) Nicolas Mahut	6–4, 6–4

== Wins over top-10 players ==
- Vahaly has a 1–5 record against players who were ranked in the top 10 at the time the match was played.

Player	Rk	Event	Surface	Rd	Score	Rk	Ref
2003
(Spain) Juan Carlos Ferrero	3	Indian Wells Open, United States	Hard	2R	6–4, 3–6, 6–3	140	
