= 2004 Australian Open – Men's singles =

Men's tennis tournament

Men's singles
- 2004 Australian Open

Final
- Champion: (Switzerland) Roger Federer
- Runner-up: (Russia) Marat Safin
- Score: 7–6^{(7–3)}, 6–4, 6–2

Details
- Draw: 128
- Seeds: 32

Events
Singles	men	women		boys	girls
Doubles	men	women	mixed	boys	girls
WC Singles	men	women	quad
WC Doubles	men	women	quad
Legends	men	women	mixed
- Australian Open

Roger Federer defeated Marat Safin in the final, 7–6^{(7–3)}, 6–4, 6–2 to win the men's singles tennis title at the 2004 Australian Open. It was his first Australian Open title and second major title overall. With the win, Federer gained the world No. 1 ranking for the first time in his career, and would hold the position for a record 237 consecutive weeks.

Andre Agassi was the defending champion, but lost in the semifinals to Safin. This ended his streak of 26 straight match wins at the Australian Open.

This was the only time in Andy Roddick's career where he was seeded first at a major. He lost to Safin in the quarterfinals.

13 seeded players lost in the first round, the most at a major since the 32-seed draw was adopted at the 2001 Wimbledon Championships. This record was matched in July 2025, when 13 seeds lost in the first round at Wimbledon.

This tournament marked the first Australian Open appearance of future world No. 1, Olympic gold medalist and two-time future champion Rafael Nadal; he lost to Lleyton Hewitt in the third round.

== Seeds ==
1. (United States) Andy Roddick (quarterfinals)
2. (Switzerland) Roger Federer (champion)
3. (Spain) Juan Carlos Ferrero (semifinals)
4. (United States) Andre Agassi (semifinals)
5. (Argentina) Guillermo Coria (first round)
6. (Germany) Rainer Schüttler (first round)
7. (Spain) ~~Carlos Moyá~~ (withdrew due to ankle injury)
8. (Argentina) David Nalbandian (quarterfinals)
9. (France) Sébastien Grosjean (quarterfinals, retired)
10. (Australia) Mark Philippoussis (fourth round)
11. (United Kingdom) Tim Henman (third round)
12. (Chile) Nicolás Massú (first round)
13. (Thailand) Paradorn Srichaphan (fourth round)
14. (Czech Republic) Jiří Novák (third round)
15. (Australia) Lleyton Hewitt (fourth round)
16. (Netherlands) Sjeng Schalken (fourth round)
17. (Netherlands) Martin Verkerk (first round)
18. (Morocco) Younes El Aynaoui (first round)
19. (Brazil) Gustavo Kuerten (third round)
20. (Spain) Tommy Robredo (first round)
21. (United States) Mardy Fish (first round)
22. (Argentina) Agustín Calleri (second round)
23. (Spain) Félix Mantilla (first round)
24. (Belarus) Max Mirnyi (first round)
25. (Sweden) Jonas Björkman (first round)
26. (Spain) Albert Costa (third round)
27. (United States) Taylor Dent (third round)
28. (Spain) Feliciano López (first round)
29. (United States) Vince Spadea (first round)
30. (France) Arnaud Clément (first round)
31. (South Africa) Wayne Ferreira (third round)
32. (United States) Robby Ginepri (fourth round)

== Draw ==
Key

- Q = Qualifier
- WC = Wild card
- LL = Lucky loser
- Alt = Alternate
- ITF = ITF entry
- PR = Protected ranking
- SR = Special ranking
- SE = Special exempt
- JE = Junior exempt
- JR = Junior Accelerator Programme entrant
- CO = College Accelerator Programme entrant
- NG = Next Gen Accelerator Program entrant
- w/o = Walkover
- r = Retired
- d = Defaulted

=== Finals ===
Quarterfinals
1	(United States) Andy Roddick	6	3	5	7^{7}	4
(Russia) Marat Safin	2	6	7	6^{0}	6
4	(United States) Andre Agassi	6	2
9	(France) Sébastien Grosjean	2	0^{r}
(Morocco) Hicham Arazi	1	6^{6}	6^{5}
3	(Spain) Juan Carlos Ferrero	6	7^{8}	7^{7}
8	(Argentina) David Nalbandian	5	4	7	3
2	(Switzerland) Roger Federer	7	6	5	6

Semifinals
(Russia) Marat Safin	7^{8}	7^{8}	5	1	6
4	(United States) Andre Agassi	6^{6}	6^{6}	7	6	3
3	(Spain) Juan Carlos Ferrero	4	1	4
2	(Switzerland) Roger Federer	6	6	6

Final
(Russia) Marat Safin	6^{3}	4	2
2	(Switzerland) Roger Federer	7^{7}	6	6

=== Top half ===
==== Section 1 ====
First round
1	(United States) A Roddick	6	7	7^{7}
(Chile) F González	2	5	6^{4}
PR	(Czech Republic) B Ulihrach	6	3	6	6
(Germany) L Burgsmüller	4	6	2	1
(Georgia (country)) I Labadze	4	3	6	3
(Argentina) JI Chela	6	6	3	6
Q	(Spain) F Verdasco	2	1	1^{r}
27	(United States) T Dent	6	6	2
18	(Morocco) Y El Aynaoui	1^{r}
(Spain) G Blanco	4
(Austria) J Melzer	6	6	6
(Germany) T Behrend	1	2	2
(Spain) D Ferrer	7^{7}	6	6
Q	(Luxembourg) G Müller	6^{4}	1	3
Q	(Denmark) K Carlsen	5	3	1
16	(Netherlands) S Schalken	7	6	6

Second round
1	(United States) A Roddick	6	6	6
PR	(Czech Republic) B Ulihrach	2	2	3
(Argentina) JI Chela	6	4	6	6^{4}	5
27	(United States) T Dent	3	6	4	7^{7}	7
(Spain) G Blanco	3	4	3
(Austria) J Melzer	6	6	6
(Spain) D Ferrer	3	2	7	1
16	(Netherlands) S Schalken	6	6	5	6

Third round
1	(United States) A Roddick	6	6	6
27	(United States) T Dent	2	0	2
(Austria) J Melzer	6^{1}	4	1
16	(Netherlands) S Schalken	7^{7}	6	6

Fourth round
1	(United States) A Roddick	6	6	6
16	(Netherlands) S Schalken	1	2	3

==== Section 2 ====
First round
12	(Chile) N Massú	1	7^{7}	2	3
(Finland) J Nieminen	6	6^{5}	6	6
(Russia) M Safin	6	3	6	6
(United States) B Vahaly	2	6	3	4
(France) A Dupuis	6	6	6^{5}	6^{4}	3
(United States) T Martin	4	4	7^{7}	7^{7}	6
(Croatia) I Karlović	7^{7}	7^{7}	7^{7}
21	(United States) M Fish	6^{0}	6^{5}	6^{4}
30	(France) A Clément	7^{8}	6	4	1	2
(Russia) N Davydenko	6^{6}	4	6	6	6
Q	(France) O Patience	4	4	7^{7}	6	6
(Russia) I Andreev	6	6	6^{4}	1	2
(Spain) Ó Hernández	1	3	1
(Ecuador) N Lapentti	6	6	6
(United States) J Blake	6	6	6
LL	(Peru) I Miranda	1	4	4

Second round
(Finland) J Nieminen	6^{5}	4	6	4
(Russia) M Safin	7^{7}	6	4	6
(United States) T Martin	7^{7}	7^{7}	7^{9}
(Croatia) I Karlović	6^{4}	6^{4}	6^{7}
(Russia) N Davydenko	6^{2}	7^{9}	3	2
Q	(France) O Patience	7^{7}	6^{7}	6	6
(Ecuador) N Lapentti	3	6^{4}	6	1
(United States) J Blake	6	7^{7}	2	6

Third round
(Russia) M Safin	7	1	4	6	7
(United States) T Martin	5	6	6	0	5
Q	(France) O Patience	1	3	2
(United States) J Blake	6	6	6

Fourth round
(Russia) M Safin	7^{7}	6	6^{6}	6
(United States) J Blake	6^{3}	3	7^{8}	3

==== Section 3 ====
First round
4	(United States) A Agassi	6	6	6
WC	(Australia) T Larkham	1	3	4
(France) N Mahut	4	2	7	3
Q	(Czech Republic) T Berdych	6	6	5	6
(Slovakia) K Beck	6	6	2	6
(Austria) S Koubek	4	0	6	4
(Sweden) T Enqvist	4	6	6	7^{8}
29	(United States) V Spadea	6	4	4	6^{6}
19	(Brazil) G Kuerten	5	6	6	2	8
(Netherlands) J van Lottum	7	0	1	6	6
(Russia) D Tursunov	6^{2}	4	7	2
(Croatia) I Ljubičić	7^{7}	6	5	6
Q	(France) J Golmard	7^{7}	6	6
(Spain) A Portas	6^{3}	4	1
(Argentina) J Acasuso	5	4	0
13	(Thailand) P Srichaphan	7	6	6

Second round
4	(United States) A Agassi	6	6	6
Q	(Czech Republic) T Berdych	0	2	4
(Slovakia) K Beck	5	6	3	4
(Sweden) T Enqvist	7	4	6	6
19	(Brazil) G Kuerten	7	6^{5}	6	6
(Croatia) I Ljubičić	5	7^{7}	4	3
Q	(France) J Golmard	3	0^{r}
13	(Thailand) P Srichaphan	6	0

Third round
4	(United States) A Agassi	6	6	6
(Sweden) T Enqvist	0	3	3
19	(Brazil) G Kuerten	3	5	4
13	(Thailand) P Srichaphan	6	7	6

Fourth round
4	(United States) A Agassi	7^{7}	6	6
13	(Thailand) P Srichaphan	6^{3}	3	4

==== Section 4 ====
First round
9	(France) S Grosjean	6	6	7
(Russia) M Youzhny	1	4	5
(United States) J-M Gambill	6	6	0
(France) G Carraz	2	3	0^{r}
(Slovakia) D Hrbatý	6	6	6
(Brazil) F Saretta	3	3	3
(Argentina) G Gaudio	6	6	7^{8}
20	(Spain) T Robredo	3	2	6^{6}
32	(United States) R Ginepri	7	6	6
(Peru) L Horna	5	3	3
WC	(Australia) C Guccione	6	7^{7}	6
WC	(Australia) A Jones	3	6^{3}	2
WC	(France) N Escudé	6	7^{7}	6
(South Korea) H-t Lee	3	6^{5}	2
(Sweden) R Söderling	4	4	7	6	6
6	(Germany) R Schüttler	6	6	5	3	4

Second round
9	(France) S Grosjean	6	6	6
(United States) J-M Gambill	4	3	2
(Slovakia) D Hrbatý	6	7	6
(Argentina) G Gaudio	1	5	0
32	(United States) R Ginepri	6	6	6
WC	(Australia) C Guccione	4	3	3
WC	(France) N Escudé	6	7^{7}	6
(Sweden) R Söderling	3	6^{4}	4

Third round
9	(France) S Grosjean	2	6	6	6
(Slovakia) D Hrbatý	6	4	1	3
32	(United States) R Ginepri	6	6	6
WC	(France) N Escudé	2	3	4

Fourth round
9	(France) S Grosjean	6	3	6	6
32	(United States) R Ginepri	4	6	4	1

=== Bottom half ===
==== Section 5 ====
First round
5	(Argentina) G Coria	6^{7}	2	4
(France) C Saulnier	7^{9}	6	6
(France) O Mutis	5	6	0	3
(Morocco) H Arazi	7	2	6	6
WC	(Australia) W Arthurs	7^{7}	6	6^{2}	6^{5}	6
Q	(Croatia) R Karanušić	6^{2}	4	7^{7}	7^{7}	2
PR	(United Kingdom) G Rusedski	4	3	4
26	(Spain) A Costa	6	6	6
17	(Netherlands) M Verkerk	4	6	3	4
(Spain) À Corretja	6	1	6	6
(Netherlands) R Sluiter	7^{7}	4	6	4	3
(Croatia) M Ančić	6^{4}	6	3	6	6
(France) F Santoro	7	4	7	6
WC	(Australia) P Luczak	5	6	5	1
PR	(Sweden) T Johansson	6^{6}	2	6^{4}
10	(Australia) M Philippoussis	7^{8}	6	7^{7}

Second round
(France) C Saulnier	6	1	2	0^{r}
(Morocco) H Arazi	3	6	6	0
WC	(Australia) W Arthurs	7^{7}	5	6	4	6
26	(Spain) A Costa	6^{5}	7	4	6	8
(Spain) À Corretja	4	6	3	7^{7}	5
(Croatia) M Ančić	6	1	6	6^{4}	7
(France) F Santoro	6	3	4	2
10	(Australia) M Philippoussis	4	6	6	6

Third round
(Morocco) H Arazi	2	7^{7}	6	6
26	(Spain) A Costa	6	6^{2}	2	1
(Croatia) M Ančić	4	6^{2}	2
10	(Australia) M Philippoussis	6	7^{7}	6

Fourth round
(Morocco) H Arazi	6	6	6
10	(Australia) M Philippoussis	2	2	4

==== Section 6 ====
First round
14	(Czech Republic) J Novák	6	6	7
(Belgium) O Rochus	3	3	5
(Spain) R Ramírez Hidalgo	2	6	3	4
LL	(Czech Republic) J Vacek	6	3	6	6
Q	(United States) J Salzenstein	6^{3}	6	3	6	4
Q	(United States) G Weiner	7^{7}	4	6	3	6
(Romania) A Pavel	6^{2}	6	6	7^{7}
24	(Belarus) M Mirnyi	7^{7}	3	2	6^{2}
28	(Spain) F López	6	6	6^{3}	4	2
(Spain) A Martín	3	4	7^{7}	6	6
(Sweden) J Johansson	6	7^{7}	6
(Germany) A Popp	4	6^{3}	4
(Germany) N Kiefer	3	6	3	4
(Italy) F Volandri	6	4	6	6
(Spain) Á Montañés	0	1	1
3	(Spain) JC Ferrero	6	6	6

Second round
14	(Czech Republic) J Novák	6	7^{7}	6
LL	(Czech Republic) J Vacek	2	6^{3}	4
Q	(United States) G Weiner	4	4	2
(Romania) A Pavel	6	6	6
(Spain) A Martín	6^{5}	3	5
(Sweden) J Johansson	7^{7}	6	7
(Italy) F Volandri	4	6^{3}	5
3	(Spain) JC Ferrero	6	7^{7}	7

Third round
14	(Czech Republic) J Novák	6	6	5	6^{3}	4
(Romania) A Pavel	4	3	7	7^{7}	6
(Sweden) J Johansson	1	6^{4}	7^{7}	4
3	(Spain) JC Ferrero	6	7^{7}	6^{5}	6

Fourth round
(Romania) A Pavel	4	6	3	2
3	(Spain) JC Ferrero	6	3	6	6

==== Section 7 ====
First round
8	(Argentina) D Nalbandian	6	6	6
Q	(Brazil) R Mello	2	1	4
Q	(Germany) F Mayer	7^{10}	7^{8}	6
(France) R Gasquet	6^{8}	6^{6}	3
(Spain) D Sánchez	6^{1}	7^{7}	4	6	6
(South Africa) W Moodie	7^{7}	6^{5}	6	4	3
(Romania) V Hănescu	4	6	6^{3}	1
31	(South Africa) W Ferreira	6	3	7^{7}	6
22	(Argentina) A Calleri	6	3	6	7
(Belgium) C Rochus	1	6	3	5
PR	(Argentina) G Cañas	6	6	6
Q	(France) S de Chaunac	2	2	4
(Italy) D Sanguinetti	7^{7}	6	2	3	3
(Czech Republic) R Štěpánek	6^{3}	3	6	6	6
(Monaco) J-R Lisnard	2	4	2
11	(United Kingdom) T Henman	6	6	6

Second round
8	(Argentina) D Nalbandian	6	6	6
Q	(Germany) F Mayer	1	0	3
(Spain) D Sánchez	6	3	4	4
31	(South Africa) W Ferreira	2	6	6	6
22	(Argentina) A Calleri	1	6	6	6^{2}	4
PR	(Argentina) G Cañas	6	4	2	7^{7}	6
(Czech Republic) R Štěpánek	2	6	3	0
11	(United Kingdom) T Henman	6	4	6	6

Third round
8	(Argentina) D Nalbandian	6	6	7
31	(South Africa) W Ferreira	2	4	5
PR	(Argentina) G Cañas	6^{5}	5	7^{7}	7	9
11	(United Kingdom) T Henman	7^{7}	7	6^{3}	5	7

Fourth round
8	(Argentina) D Nalbandian	6	6	6
PR	(Argentina) G Cañas	4	2	1

==== Section 8 ====
First round
15	(Australia) L Hewitt	6	6	0
Q	(Philippines) C Mamiit	2	4	1^{r}
(Belgium) X Malisse	2	3	4
(Slovakia) K Kučera	6	6	6
(Spain) R Nadal	6	6	6
Q	(Czech Republic) M Tabara	1	2	2
(France) T Ascione	7	6	7^{7}
23	(Spain) F Mantilla	5	1	6^{3}
25	(Sweden) J Björkman	2	3	1
(Armenia) S Sargsian	6	6	6
WC	(Uzbekistan) V Kutsenko	3	2	3
WC	(Australia) T Reid	6	6	6
Q	(United States) J Morrison	6	6	6
(Netherlands) D van Scheppingen	4	2	4
Q	(United States) A Bogomolov Jr.	3	4	0
2	(Switzerland) R Federer	6	6	6

Second round
15	(Australia) L Hewitt	1	6	6	6
(Slovakia) K Kučera	6	1	4	1
(Spain) R Nadal	6	3	7	6
(France) T Ascione	4	6	5	1
(Armenia) S Sargsian	3	4	6	7^{8}	4
WC	(Australia) T Reid	6	6	4	6^{6}	6
Q	(United States) J Morrison	2	3	4
2	(Switzerland) R Federer	6	6	6

Third round
15	(Australia) L Hewitt	7^{7}	7^{7}	6
(Spain) R Nadal	6^{2}	6^{5}	2
WC	(Australia) T Reid	3	0	1
2	(Switzerland) R Federer	6	6	6

Fourth round
15	(Australia) L Hewitt	6	3	0	4
2	(Switzerland) R Federer	4	6	6	6

Preceded by 2003 US Open – Men's singles	Grand Slam men's singles	Succeeded by 2004 French Open – Men's singles
