= Emmanuelle Gagliardi =

Swiss tennis player (born 1976)

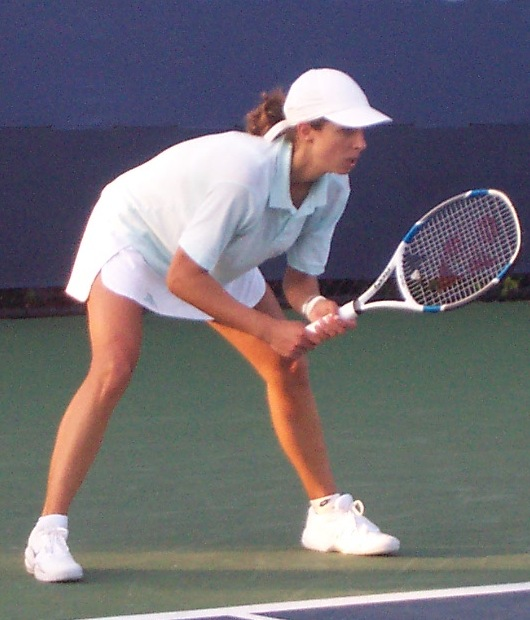
- Country (sports): Monaco (1992-1997); Switzerland (1997 July-2008)
- Residence: Monte Carlo, Monaco
- Born: 9 July 1976 (age 49) Geneva, Switzerland
- Height: 1.71 m (5 ft 7 in)
- Turned pro: 1994
- Retired: 2008
- Plays: Right-handed (two-handed backhand)
- Prize money: $1,739,751

Singles
- Career record: 391–342
- Career titles: 8 ITF
- Highest ranking: No. 42 (13 May 2002)

Grand Slam singles results
- Australian Open: 3R (2001)
- French Open: 4R (2005)
- Wimbledon: 3R (2001, 2004)
- US Open: 1R (1997, 1998, 1999, 2000, 2001, 2002, 2003, 2004, 2005, 2007)

Other tournaments
- Olympic Games: 2R (2000)

Doubles
- Career record: 194–184
- Career titles: 4 WTA, 6 ITF
- Highest ranking: No. 22 (27 September 2004)

Grand Slam doubles results
- Australian Open: SF (2003)
- French Open: 3R (2003, 2007)
- Wimbledon: 3R (2004, 2005)
- US Open: QF (2002)

Other doubles tournaments
- Olympic Games: 2R (2008)

Mixed doubles
- Career record: 9–9
- Career titles: 1

Grand Slam mixed doubles results
- Australian Open: 2R (2004)
- French Open: 1R (2003, 2005)
- Wimbledon: 2R (2004, 2005)
- US Open: QF (2004)

Team competitions
- Fed Cup: F (1998), record 23–9

Emmanuelle Gagliardi (born 9 July 1976) is a retired Swiss tennis player.

She was coached by Marco Tarelli and her preferred surface was hardcourt.

Gagliardi never won a WTA Tour singles title, but reached the semifinals of the 2002 Indian Wells Masters, losing to eventual champion Daniela Hantuchová, in three sets. She was a member of the Switzerland Fed Cup team that reached the final in 1998. She was also a member of the Swiss team for the 2008 Summer Olympics and played doubles with Patty Schnyder, reaching the second round. She has not been active on the WTA Tour ever since.

In doubles, Gagliardi reached the semifinals of the 2003 Australian Open with Petra Mandula and won the 2004 China Open, a Premier tournament, with Dinara Safina.

== Grand Slam singles performance timeline ==
Key
W	F	SF	QF	#R	RR	Q#	DNQ	A	NH

(W) winner; (F) finalist; (SF) semifinalist; (QF) quarterfinalist; (#R) rounds 4, 3, 2, 1; (RR) round-robin stage; (Q#) qualification round; (DNQ) did not qualify; (A) absent; (NH) not held; (SR) strike rate (events won / competed); (W–L) win–loss record.

Tournament	1997	1998	1999	2000	2001	2002	2003	2004	2005	2006	2007
Australian Open	1R	1R	A	2R	3R	2R	2R	2R	1R	1R	1R
French Open	2R	2R	2R	2R	1R	1R	2R	1R	4R	2R	1R
Wimbledon	2R	1R	1R	1R	3R	2R	2R	3R	1R	1R	1R
US Open	1R	1R	1R	1R	1R	1R	1R	1R	1R	A	1R

== WTA career finals ==
=== Doubles: 10 (4 titles, 6 runner-ups) ===
Legend
Grand Slam tourn. (0)
Tier I (0)
Tier II (1)
Tier III (2)
Tier IV & V (1)

Result	W/L	Date	Tournament	Surface	Partner	Opponents	Score
Loss	0–1	Jan 2001	Auckland Open, New Zealand	Hard	(Austria) Barbara Schett	(France) Alexandra Fusai (Italy) Rita Grande	6–7^{(7)}, 3–6
Loss	0–2	Apr 2003	Portugal Open	Clay	(Estonia) Maret Ani	(Hungary) Petra Mandula (Austria) Patricia Wartusch	7–6^{(3)}, 6–7^{(3)}, 2–6
Loss	0–3	Apr 2003	Bol Ladies Open, Croatia	Clay	(Switzerland) Patty Schnyder	(Hungary) Petra Mandula (Austria) Patricia Wartusch	3–6, 2–6
Win	1–3	Apr 2004	Portugal Open	Clay	(Slovakia) Janette Husárová	(Czech Republic) Olga Blahotová (Czech Republic) Gabriela Navrátilová	6–3, 6–2
Loss	1–4	Aug 2004	Stockholm Open, Sweden	Hard	(Germany) Anna-Lena Grönefeld	(Australia) Alicia Molik (Austria) Barbara Schett	3–6, 3–6
Loss	1–5	Aug 2004	Cincinnati Masters, US	Hard	(Germany) Anna-Lena Grönefeld	(Germany) Marlene Weingärtner (United States) Jill Craybas	5–7, 6–7^{(2)}
Win	2–5	Sep 2004	China Open	Hard	(Russia) Dinara Safina	(Argentina) Gisela Dulko (Venezuela) María Vento-Kabchi	6–4, 6–4
Win	3–5	Feb 2005	Copa Colsanitas, Colombia	Clay	(Slovenia) Tina Pisnik	(Slovakia) Ľubomíra Kurhajcová (Czech Republic) Barbora Strýcová	6–4, 6–3
Win	4–5	Sep 2005	Guangzhou Open, China	Hard	(Italy) Maria Elena Camerin	(United States) Neha Uberoi (India) Shikha Uberoi	7–6^{(5)}, 6–3
Loss	4–6	Oct 2006	Tashkent Open, Uzbekistan	Hard	(Italy) Maria Elena Camerin	(Belarus) Tatiana Poutchek (Belarus) Victoria Azarenka	w/o

=== Mixed doubles: 1 title ===
Result	W/L	Date	Tournament	Surface	Partner	Opponents	Score
Win	1.	Sep 2004	China Open	Hard	(United States) Tripp Phillips	(United States) Jill Craybas (United States) Justin Gimelstob	6–1, 6–2

== ITF Circuit finals ==
$100,000 tournaments
$75,000 tournaments
$50,000 tournaments
$25,000 tournaments
$10,000 tournaments

=== Singles: 9 (8–1) ===
Result	No	Date	Tier	Tournament	Surface	Opponent	Score
Win	1.	7 June 1993	10,000	ITF Nicolosi, Italy	Clay	(France) Laurence Bois	4–6, 6–3, 6–1
Win	2.	24 July 1995	10,000	ITF İstanbul, Turkey	Hard	(Germany) Miriam Schnitzer	6–4, 7–6^{(8)}
Win	3.	5 May 1996	25,000	ITF Florianópolis, Brazil	Clay	(Paraguay) Larissa Schaerer	6–1, 7–5
Win	4.	16 June 1996	25,000	ITF Salzburg, Austria	Clay	(Slovenia) Barbara Mulej	6–4, 6–1
Win	5.	2 November 1997	75,000	ITF Austin, United States	Hard	(Japan) Nana Smith	6–2, 3–6, 6–4
Win	6.	19 October 1998	25,000	ITF Welwyn, United Kingdom	Carpet (i)	(Luxembourg) Anne Kremer	6–1, 1–1 ret.
Loss	7.	9 July 2000	25,000	ITF Civitanova, Italy	Clay	(China) Li Na	3–6, 6–4, 6–7^{(0)}
Win	8.	21 October 2001	50,000	ITF Largo, United States	Hard	(United States) Marissa Irvin	7–6^{(5)}, 7–5
Win	9.	5 August 2007	75,000	ITF Rimini, Italy	Clay	(France) Stéphanie Foretz	6–3, 7–6^{(5)}

=== Doubles: 9 (6–3) ===
Result	No	Date	Tier	Tournament	Surface	Partner	Opponents	Score
Loss	1.	26 July 1993	10,000	ITF İstanbul, Turkey	Hard	(Italy) Alessia Sciarpelletti	(Slovakia) Patrícia Marková (Netherlands) Nathalie Thijssen	6–2, 3–6, 0–6
Win	2.	9 August 1993	10,000	ITF Nicolosi, Italy	Hard	(Italy) Alessia Sciarpelletti	(Italy) Alessia Vesuvio (Italy) Sara Ventura	7–5, 6–4
Loss	3.	30 May 1994	25,000	ITF Barcelona, Spain	Hard	(Czech Republic) Petra Kučová	(Spain) Cristina Torrens Valero (Spain) Alicia Ortuño	6–3, 2–6, 2–6
Win	4.	12 June 1995	10,000	ITF Massa, Italy	Clay	(Italy) Marzia Grossi	(Italy) Alice Canepa (Italy) Giulia Casoni	3–6, 6–4, 7–5
Win	5.	5 May 1996	25,000	ITF Florianópolis, Brazil	Clay	(Argentina) Florencia Cianfagna	(Brazil) Miriam D'Agostini (Brazil) Andrea Vieira	4–6, 6–4, 6–4
Loss	6.	16 June 1996	25,000	ITF Salzburg, Austria	Clay	(Portugal) Sofia Prazeres	(Spain) Alicia Ortuño (Argentina) Veronica Stele	0–6, 4–6
Win	7.	22 February 1999	25,000	ITF Bushey, United Kingdom	Carpet	(Hungary) Katalin Marosi	(Bulgaria) Svetlana Krivencheva (Slovenia) Tina Križan	6–7^{(4)}, 6–2, 7–6^{(0)}
Win	8.	31 October 1999	50,000	ITF Dallas, United States	Hard	(Kazakhstan) Irina Selyutina	(United States) Samantha Reeves (South Africa) Jessica Steck	6–3, 6–3
Win	9.	7 April 2008	75,000	ITF Monzón, Spain	Hard	(Japan) Rika Fujiwara	(Spain) María José Martínez Sánchez (Spain) Arantxa Parra Santonja	1–6, 7–6^{(5)}, [10–8]

== Unplayed final ==
Outcome	No.	Date	Tournament	Surface	Partner	Opponents	Score
NP	—	21 October 2001	ITF Largo, United States	Hard	(United States) Erika deLone	(New Zealand) Leanne Baker (India) Manisha Malhotra	def.
