= Jason Marshall (tennis) =

American tennis player

- Full name: Jason Marshall
- Country (sports): United States
- Born: June 20, 1978 (age 47) Dallas, Texas, U.S.
- Height: 6 ft 1 in (185 cm)
- Turned pro: 2001
- Plays: Left-handed
- Prize money: $59,506

Singles
- Highest ranking: No. 710 (December 5, 2005)

Doubles
- Career record: 1–5
- Highest ranking: No. 101 (May 9, 2005)

Grand Slam doubles results
- Wimbledon: Q1 (2004, 2005)

Jason Marshall (born June 20, 1978) is a former professional tennis player from the United States.

== Biography ==
Born in Dallas, Marshall attended J.J. Pearce High School in Richardson, Texas. After an injury-plagued high school tennis career, he was recruited by Indiana's Purdue University, where he was a two-time Big Ten singles champion.

From 2001 he competed as a professional, most successfully in the doubles format. A left-handed player, Marshall reached a best doubles ranking of 101 in the world and featured in the main draw of five ATP Tour tournaments from 2003 to 2005. He twice competed in Wimbledon qualifying for the men's doubles and won a total of five ATP Challenger titles in doubles. As a singles player, he had a win over Marcos Baghdatis in the qualifying draw of the 2005 Ho Chi Minh City Open and won an ITF tournament in Tijuana the same year.

Marshall was the head coach of women's tennis at Georgia State University between 2014 and 2018.

== Challenger titles ==
=== Doubles: (5) ===
No.	Year	Tournament	Surface	Partner	Opponents	Score
1.	2003	Donetsk, Ukraine	Hard	(India) Harsh Mankad	(Ukraine) Sergiy Stakhovsky (Russia) Andrei Stoliarov	6–2, 6–4
2.	2003	Austin, U.S.	Hard	(Chinese Taipei) Lu Yen-hsun	(Brazil) Josh Goffi (United States) Tripp Phillips	6–2, 2–6, 6–3
3.	2004	Forest Hills, U.S.	Clay	(Brazil) Bruno Soares	(Germany) Michael Berrer (Chinese Taipei) Jimmy Wang	7–6^{(5)}, 6–3
4.	2004	Nashville, U.S.	Hard	(United States) Travis Parrott	(Philippines) Cecil Mamiit (Thailand) Danai Udomchoke	6–3, 6–4
5.	2005	Besancon, France	Hard	(United States) Huntley Montgomery	(Slovakia) Michal Mertiňák (Switzerland) Jean-Claude Scherrer	6–7^{(7)}, 6–2, 6–3
