= Ryan Sachire =

American tennis player and coach

- Country (sports): United States
- Residence: Granger, Indiana, USA
- Born: April 2, 1978 (age 47) Youngstown, Ohio, USA
- Height: 6 ft 6 in (198 cm)
- Turned pro: 2001
- Retired: 2004
- Plays: Right-handed
- Prize money: US$49,419

Singles
- Career titles: 0
- Highest ranking: No. 391

Grand Slam singles results
- Australian Open: N/A
- French Open: N/A
- Wimbledon: N/A
- US Open: N/A

Other tournaments

Doubles
- Career titles: 0
- Highest ranking: No. 184
- Last updated on: October 9, 2009.

Ryan Sachire is currently the Callaghan Family Head Men's Tennis Coach at the University of Notre Dame. He was previously an American professional tennis player who captured 2 ATP Challenger doubles titles.

== Early life ==
Ryan Sachire was born April 2, 1978, in Youngstown, Ohio. He is from Canfield, Ohio, and graduated from Canfield High School (Ohio) in 1996. While playing for Canfield he only lost 5 matches and won 2 Ohio state singles titles. He was ranked 24th in the USTA nationally for 16&under singles. His father, Frank Sachire, was a former offensive tackle for Mount Union College and had a brief stint in the NFL. He presently coaches tennis in Youngstown, Ohio, and the surrounding area.

== Collegiate tennis career ==
Sachire played his college tennis for Notre Dame and compiled a 138–43 record at first singles and 73–32 at first doubles. He reached the ITA national championship final in 1998 and lost to James Blake. He also won the consolation in 1999 and reached the semis of the national clay court championships the same year. He was a 3-time ITA Midwest Championships semifinalist and was runner-up in 1996. He was a 3-time member of the USTA summer college team. Sachire is in the top 5 in 13 different categories for Notre Dame. He is 2nd with 211 combined wins and led the Irish to a 67–33 record and a 16th-place finish in 1997. They were 1999 Big East champs and in the top 35 for 4 years with 4 tournament bids. He was a 2-time conference MVP and Midwest Player of the Year. He was top rookie in 1997 and 4-time team MVP. He graduated in 2000 after studying economics and was a 2-time Big East Academic All-Star. He is first and only Notre Dame player to win 30-plus singles matches in 4 seasons and 1 of 2 to get 4 NCAA Singles Championship invitations. He was a 3-time All-American, always in the top-40 in singles and spent a great deal of time at #2 behind Harvard's James Blake (5th in the world). He won all of the ITA senior awards in 2000 being senior player of the year and winning several other awards.

== Professional tennis career ==
After graduating from Notre Dame, he played professionally for 5 years. He was ranked 184th in doubles and 391st in singles in the Association of Tennis Professionals. He won 16 doubles titles, 14 of which were futures and 2 challengers (2002 Waco and 2003 Atlantic City). He won 3 singles futures titles (College Station 1998, St. Joseph 2002, and Lachine Canada 2003). He was in the top 35 among U.S. men in both singles and doubles. His record from January 2001 – December 2008 is 128 – 92. Notable singles opponents include Bob Bryan, Wayne Odesnik, Kevin Kim, Amer Delic, and Dmitry Tursunov. He played two doubles finals against Bob and Mike Bryan, as his most notable opponents.

=== Last ATP match ===
Indianapolis, IN, USA | March 12, 2008 | R56 | $100,000 | Hard

Round	Opponent	Score	Handicap	Total
q-First	Daniel Vacek(CZE)	5–7 5–7	−4	24

=== Last competition result ===
R32|$50,000|Challenger, Hard | Entry:(q)

Round	Opponent	Score	Handicap	Total
q-First	bye			
q-Second	Dan Hanegby(ISR)	6–2 6–2	8	16
Qualifying	Fritz Wolmarans(RSA)	6–3 3–6 7–5	2	30
First	(3)Noam Okun(ISR)	6–7(5) 4–6	−3	23

== Coaching career ==
He began his coaching career at Wickertree Tennis & Fitness Center in Columbus, Ohio. He then was at Baylor as an assistant from 2005 to 2006 and has been coaching at Notre Dame ever since, first as an assistant before stepping into the head coaching role in 2013. In 2006, Sachire married Cindy Harding, a 1999 Irish graduate and former cheerleader. In February 2010, Ryan was inducted into the Canfield Hall of Fame for his accomplishments as the best tennis player to ever have played for the Cardinals.

== Sources ==
- http://www.atpworldtour.com/tennis/3/en/players/playerprofiles/?playersearch=sachire&x=0&y=0
- http://und.cstv.com/sports/m-tennis/mtt/sachire_ryan00.html
- http://und.cstv.com/sports/m-tennis/spec-rel/070208aab.html
- http://www.ncaa.com/tennis-mens/article.aspx?id=278616
- http://www.postgazette.com/sports/notebooks/20020519tennotes8.asp
- http://baylorbears.cstv.com/sports/m-tennis/mtt/sachire_ryan00.html
