= Antonia Matic =

German tennis player

- Country (sports): Germany
- Born: 31 December 1984 (age 41)
- Turned pro: 2 August 2004
- Retired: 4 August 2008
- Plays: Right-handed (two-handed backhand)
- Prize money: $94,505

Singles
- Career record: 157–199
- Career titles: 0
- Highest ranking: No. 225 (27 September 2004)

Doubles
- Career record: 117–154
- Career titles: 4 ITF
- Highest ranking: No. 135 (16 August 2004)

Antonia Matic (Serbo-Croatian: Matić; born 31 December 1984) is a former professional German tennis player. Her highest singles ranking is 225 (achieved September 2004) and her highest doubles ranking is 135 (August 2004).

Antonia won four doubles titles on the ITF Women's Circuit in her career, and also played on the WTA Tour.

She retired from professional tennis, after losing in the second qualifying round of the tournament in Hechingen to Lina Stančiūtė, 4–6, 2–6 in August 2008.

== ITF finals ==
Legend
$75,000 tournaments
$25,000 tournaments
$10,000 tournaments

=== Singles (0–2) ===
Outcome	No.	Date	Tournament	Surface	Opponent	Score
Runner-up	1.	27 December 1999	Chandigarh, India	Grass	(Slovenia) Urška Vesenjak	2–6, 0–6
Runner-up	2.	7 October 2007	Les Franqueses del Vallès, Spain	Hard	(Spain) Cynthia Prieto García	6–2, 4–6, 6–7^{(5–7)}

=== Doubles (4–9) ===
Outcome	No.	Date	Tournament	Surface	Partner	Opponents	Score
Runner-up	1.	30 July 2000	Vancouver, Canada	Hard	(South Korea) Chang Kyung-mi	(United States) Annica Cooper (United States) Brandi Freudenberg	4–6, 2–6
Runner-up	2.	7 January 2003	Tallahassee, United States	Hard	(United States) Arpi Kojian	(Slovenia) Petra Rampre (Czech Republic) Vladimíra Uhlířová	2–6, 6–7
Winner	3.	6 July 2003	Stuttgart-Vaihingen, Germany	Clay	(Germany) Angelika Rösch	(Bulgaria) Maria Geznenge (Serbia) Dragana Zarić	6–1, 7–6^{(7–2)}
Runner-up	4.	14 July 2003	Garching bei München, Germany	Clay	(Germany) Lydia Steinbach	(Germany) Angelika Bachmann (Czech Republic) Lenka Němečková	2–6, 6–7^{(7–9)}
Runner-up	5.	3 August 2003	Saulgau, Germany	Clay	(Germany) Lydia Steinbach	(Germany) Christina Fitz (Germany) Kathrin Wörle-Scheller	2–6, 1–6
Runner-up	6.	22 September 2003	Jounieh, Lebanon	Clay	(Germany) Stefanie Weis	(Germany) Isabel Collischonn (Hungary) Kira Nagy	4–6, 6–7
Runner-up	7.	25 January 2004	Grenoble, France	Hard (i)	(Slovakia) Lenka Tvarošková	(Germany) Martina Müller (Germany) Stefanie Weis	2–6, 1–6
Runner-up	8.	2 May 2004	Cagnes-sur-Mer, France	Clay	(Romania) Ruxandra Dragomir	(Bulgaria) Lubomira Bacheva (Czech Republic) Eva Birnerová	6–3, 6–7^{(4–7)}, 3–6
Runner-up	9.	20 June 2005	Périgueux, France	Clay	(Uzbekistan) Akgul Amanmuradova	(Slovakia) Katarína Kachlíková (Slovakia) Lenka Tvarošková	5–7, 1–6
Runner-up	10.	7 August 2005	Vancouver, Canada	Hard	(United States) Lauren Barnikow	(United Kingdom) Sarah Borwell (United States) Sarah Riske	4–6, 6–3, 6–7^{(0–7)}
Winner	11.	21 August 2007	Wahlstedt, Germany	Clay	(Serbia) Neda Kozić	(Austria) Stefanie Haidner (Poland) Natalia Kołat	6–1, 2–6, 6–3
Winner	12.	19 November 2007	Mount Gambier, Australia	Hard	(Romania) Monica Niculescu	(Australia) Sophie Ferguson (Australia) Trudi Musgrave	5–7, 6–3 [10–8]
Winner	13.	2 March 2008	Buchen, Germany	Carpet (i)	(Germany) Laura Haberkorn	(Slovakia) Michaela Pochabová (Slovakia) Patrícia Verešová	6–2, 6–4
