= Lu Hao (tennis) =

Chinese tennis player

- Country (sports): China
- Born: 30 January 1984 (age 42)
- Prize money: $19,767

Singles
- Career record: 1–1
- Highest ranking: No. 592 (25 July 2005)

Doubles
- Career record: 0–1
- Highest ranking: No. 698 (25 July 2005)

Lu Hao (born 30 January 1984) is a Chinese former professional tennis player.

Lu made his only ATP Tour singles main draw appearance as a wildcard at the 2004 China Open and won his first round match over Prakash Amritraj, before losing in the second round to eventual champion Marat Safin.

In 2004 and 2005 he featured in a total of three Davis Cup ties for China, winning two of his four singles rubbers.

== ITF Futures titles ==
=== Doubles: (2) ===
No.	Date	Tournament	Surface	Partner	Opponents	Score
1.	Jun 2005	China F3, Wuhan	Hard	(China) Yu Xinyuan	(Chinese Taipei) Lee Hsin-han (Chinese Taipei) Liu Tai-wei	7–6^{(4)}, 6–3
2.	May 2009	China F3, Taizhou	Hard	(China) Xu Junchao	(China) Gong Maoxin (China) Zeng Shaoxuan	6–7^{(3)}, 6–4, [10–4]
