= Glenn Weiner =

American tennis player

- Country (sports): United States
- Residence: Long Beach, California
- Born: April 27, 1976 (age 48); Johannesburg, South Africa
- Height: 6 ft 2 in (188 cm)
- Turned pro: 1994
- Plays: Right-handed
- Prize money: $498,614

Singles
- Career record: 13-25
- Career titles: 0
- Highest ranking: No. 119 (July 19, 2004)

Grand Slam singles results
- Australian Open: 2R (2004)
- Wimbledon: 1R (2004)
- US Open: 1R (2005)

Doubles
- Career record: 20-29
- Career titles: 0
- Highest ranking: No. 85 (February 18, 2002)

Grand Slam doubles results
- Australian Open: 1R (2002)
- French Open: 1R (2002)
- Wimbledon: 2R (2001, 2006)
- US Open: 1R (1993, 2001, 2002)

Glenn Weiner (born April 27, 1976) is a former professional tennis player from the United States.

== Career ==
Weiner won his first match on the ATP Tour in 1997, at the Infiniti Open, where he defeated Bob Bryan. Despite being ranked 280th in the world coming into the tournament, Weiner came close to beating the previous year's Wimbledon winner, Richard Krajicek, in the second round. He had four match points, but was unable to convert any of them and lost in a third set tie break. Just weeks later, Weiner upset world number 36 Thomas Johansson at Indianapolis.

In 2001 he was runner-up in the doubles at Newport, with André Sá. He also made the quarterfinals of the Heineken Open singles that year.

He defeated countryman Jeff Salzenstein in the 2004 Australian Open, the only time he reached the second round of a Grand Slam singles draw. He did however twice make the second round in the Wimbledon Men's Doubles.

== ATP career finals ==
=== Doubles: 1 (0–1) ===
Result	W/L	Date	Tournament	Surface	Partner	Opponents	Score
Loss	0–1	Jul 2001	Newport, United States	Grass	(Brazil) André Sá	(United States) Bob Bryan (United States) Mike Bryan	3–6, 5–7

== Challenger titles ==
=== Doubles: (11) ===
No.	Year	Tournament	Surface	Partner	Opponents	Score
1.	1997	Curitiba, Brazil	Clay	(Austria) Herbert Wiltschnig	(Argentina) Eduardo Medica (Argentina) Mariano Puerta	6–3, 6–4
2.	1997	Belo Horizonte, Brazil	Hard	(Romania) Gabriel Trifu	(Brazil) Nelson Aerts (Brazil) Andre Sa	1–6, 6–3, 6–4
3.	1998	Denver, United States	Hard	(Australia) Michael Hill	(South Africa) Justin Bower (Australia) Troy Budgen	7–6, 6–4
4.	2002	Waikoloa, Hawaii, United States	Hard	(Romania) Gabriel Trifu	(United States) James Blake (United States) Justin Gimelstob	6–4, 4–6, 6–4
5.	2002	Calabasas, United States	Hard	(South Africa) Paul Rosner	(United States) Justin Gimelstob (United States) Paul Goldstein	6–2, 4–6, 7–6^{(7–4)}
6.	2002	Lexington, United States	Hard	(United States) Jack Brasington	(United States) Brandon Coupe (Philippines) Eric Taino	6–2, 4–6, 7–5
7.	2002	Champaign, United States	Hard	(Romania) Gabriel Trifu	(Philippines) Eric Taino (Netherlands) Martin Verkerk	6–3, 6–2
8.	2004	Homestead, United States	Hard	(Romania) Gabriel Trifu	(United States) Huntley Montgomery (United States) Tripp Phillips	5–7, 7–5, 6–2
9.	2005	Lubbock, United States	Hard	(United States) Hugo Armando	(United States) Jan-Michael Gambill (United States) Scott Oudsema	5–7, 6–2, 7–6^{(9–7)}
10.	2005	Quito, Ecuador	Clay	(United States) Hugo Armando	(Chile) Paul Capdeville (Chile) Adrián García	6–3, 6–1
11.	2006	Tallahassee, United States	Hard	(South Africa) Rik De Voest	(United States) Tripp Phillips (United States) Bobby Reynolds	3–6, 6–3, [10–0]
