= Justin Gimelstob =

American tennis player

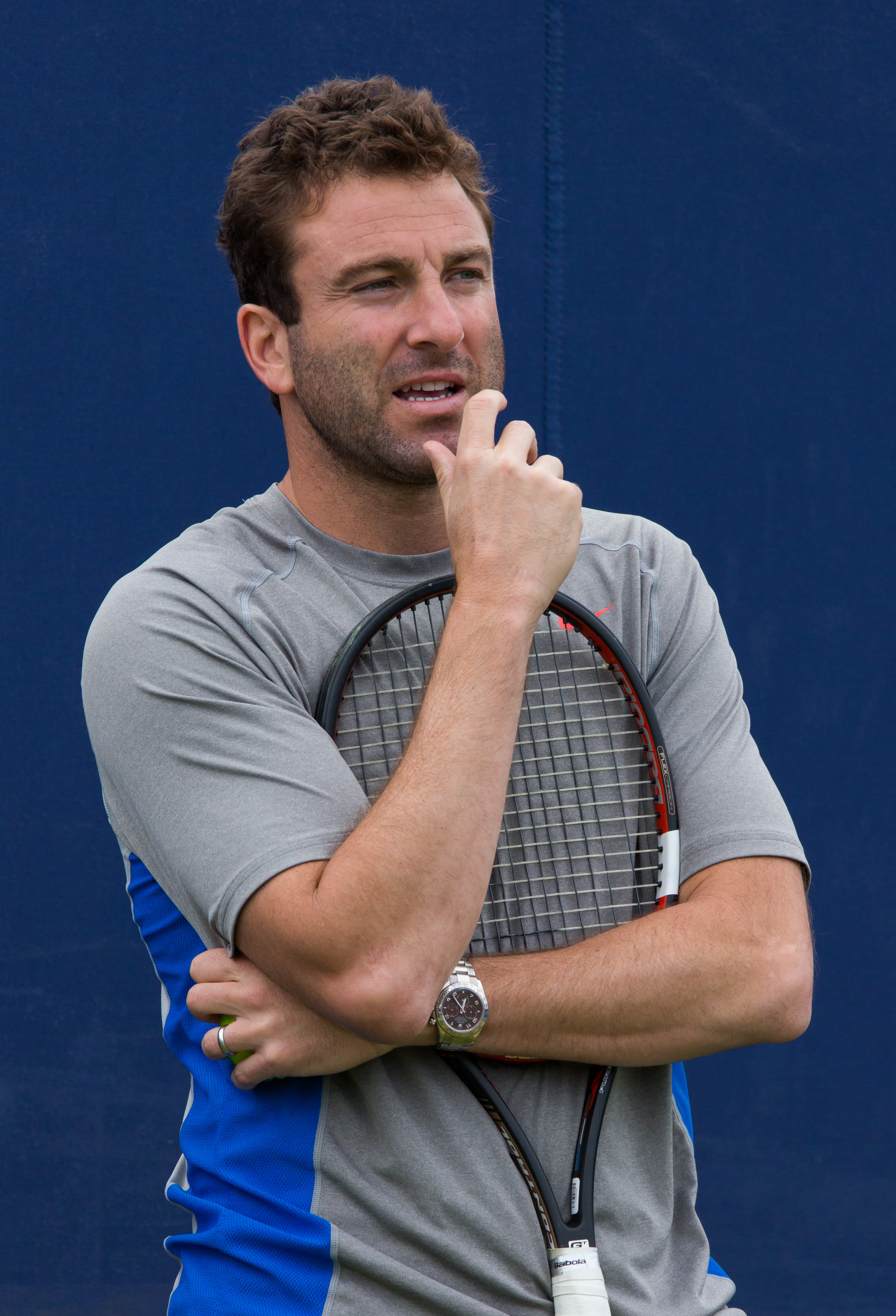
- Full name: Justin Jeremy Gimelstob
- Country (sports): United States
- Residence: Santa Monica, California, U.S.
- Born: January 26, 1977 (age 49) Livingston, New Jersey, U.S.
- Height: 6 ft 5 in (1.96 m)
- Turned pro: 1996
- Retired: 2007
- Plays: Right-handed (one-handed backhand)
- Coach: David Nainkin (circa 2000); Brandon Coupe
- Prize money: $2,575,522

Singles
- Career record: 107–172
- Career titles: 0
- Highest ranking: No. 63 (April 19, 1999)

Grand Slam singles results
- Australian Open: 2R (1999)
- French Open: 1R (1999, 2000, 2003, 2006, 2007)
- Wimbledon: 3R (2000, 2003, 2005)
- US Open: 3R (1997, 1999)

Doubles
- Career record: 174–158
- Career titles: 13
- Highest ranking: No. 18 (May 8, 2000)

Grand Slam doubles results
- Australian Open: SF (2001)
- French Open: 1R (1997, 1998, 1999, 2000, 2003, 2006, 2007)
- Wimbledon: QF (1998, 2004)
- US Open: 3R (1999, 2004, 2007)

Mixed doubles
- Career record: 33–15
- Career titles: 2

Grand Slam mixed doubles results
- Australian Open: W (1998)
- French Open: W (1998)
- Wimbledon: SF (1998)
- US Open: SF (2002, 2006)

Team competitions
- Davis Cup: SF (1998)
- Hopman Cup: W (1997)
- Last updated on: 10 June 2021.

Justin Jeremy Gimelstob (born January 26, 1977) is an American retired tennis player. Gimelstob has been a resident of Morristown, New Jersey, and as of 2009 lived in Santa Monica, California.

He was the top-ranked boy in his age group at the ages of 12, 14, 16, and 18. As a pro, he made the final of the Newport Tournament in singles and has 15 doubles championships to his name, including the 1998 Australian Open and 1998 French Open mixed doubles titles with Venus Williams. He was twice a member of the U.S. Davis Cup team.

In singles matches, he defeated Andre Agassi, Petr Korda, Àlex Corretja, Pat Rafter, and Gustavo Kuerten. His career singles record was 107–172. His highest career singles ranking was No. 63 in 1999, and his highest career doubles ranking was No. 18 in 2000.

== Tennis career ==
=== Juniors ===
Gimelstob had one of the most successful junior tennis careers in American junior tennis history. He started playing tennis when he was eight, and was the top-ranked boy in his age group from ages 12 through 18. In 1991, he was ranked No. 1 in the USTA Boys' 14 age group, and he was No. 1 ranked again in the USTA Boys' 16 age group, winning the USTA championship, in 1993. He was also ranked No. 1 at age 18, and in 1995 he won the USTA National Boys' 18 Championships.

Gimelstob grew up in the New Vernon section of Harding Township, New Jersey. He graduated from Newark Academy in Livingston, New Jersey, in 1995. As a sophomore at Newark Academy, Gimelstob led the school's tennis team to a 26–0 record and won the state Tournament of Champions. In 2005, he was entered into the high school's hall of fame, the Newark (N.J.) Academy Hall of Fame. The high school named its tennis facility after him and his brothers.

Gimelstob, as a resident of Essex Fells, New Jersey, competed in junior tennis.

=== College and pro careers ===
In January 1995, Gimelstob enrolled at UCLA after first recruiting him as a 12 year old, and eliciting legendary UCLA basketball coach John Wooden during his recruitment process, Gimelstob accepted a scholarship to attend UCLA after graduating high school a year early. There, he completed his first semester with a 4.0 GPA and throughout his two years maintained the highest GPA of any student athlete. He was an Academic All American is his freshman year. In Gimelstob's sophomore season he was ranked #1 in singles and doubles, while leading UCLA to the #1 team ranking throughout the season until losing a heartbreaking final to Stanford after defeating them three times during the season. Gimelstob went on to partner Srdan Muskatirovic to win the 1996 NCAA Doubles Championship.

In September 1995, when he defeated David Prinosil in the first round of the U.S. Open it was stated in Sports Illustrated. that Gimelstob was ranked # 1,154 at the time, and Prinosil #85.

Gimelstob turned pro in 1996. At Wimbledon in June 1997 he upset world # 12 Gustavo Kuerten, 6–3, 6–4, 4–6, 1–6, 6–4. In July 1997, he defeated world # 32 Andre Agassi at the ATP event in Los Angeles, 7–5, 6–2. Later that month, he defeated world # 16 Petr Korda 6–4, 6–4 in Montreal. Gimelstob then reached the 3rd round at the 1997 US Open.

Gimelstob subsequently established himself chiefly as a doubles specialist, winning 12 titles. In 11 appearances at the US Open, he partnered 11 different players.

He won the 1998 Australian Open and French Open mixed doubles titles, with Venus Williams as his partner. In June 1998 at Wimbledon he beat world No. 9 Àlex Corretja in straight sets. In July he upset world No. 5 Pat Rafter 6–4, 6–3 in Los Angeles.

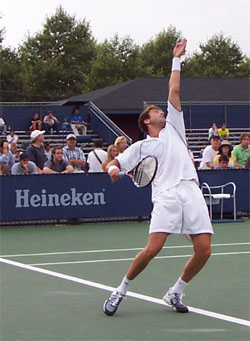
Gimelstob serving

In March he beat world # 22 Thomas Muster, 6–4, 7–5 in Scottsdale, and in August he upset world # 7 Todd Martin, 6–4, 6–4 in Cincinnati. In June 2000 he beat world No.27 Fabrice Santoro in London, 4–6, 6–4, 6–0. In July he upset world # 19 Mark Philippoussis 3–6, 7–6 (7–5), 7–6 (7–3). In 2001, he and partner Scott Humphries got to the semifinals of the Australian Open. At the US Open, 5' 9" Michal Tabara was fined $1,000 for unsportsmanlike behavior for spitting at Gimelstob after their match. Tabara felt Gimelstob had taken an excessive number of time outs for injuries. "Unless he grows about another foot by the time I get back to the locker room", the 6' 5" Gimelstob said, "he's in trouble."

At the 2002 U.S. Open singles competition, Gimelstob lost in the second round to Andre Agassi. In doubles, he and Jeff Tarango lost in the 2nd round to Brian MacPhee and Nenad Zimonjić, 7–5, 2–6, 6–7 (5–7). In February 2003 he upset world No. 13 Paradorn Srichaphan, 7–5 6–2, in San Jose. At Wimbledon in 2003, he competed in both the singles and doubles events. He upset No. 15 seed Arnaud Clément of France in the second round in five sets. In the third round, Gimelstob lost in three sets to Jonas Björkman of Sweden.

At Wimbledon 2004, Gimelstob and Scott Humphries defeated Bob and Mike Bryan 6–3, 3–6, 6–4 in the second round. They lost to Mark Knowles and Daniel Nestor in the quarterfinals, 3–6, 2–6. In July 2004, Gimelstob won in singles at Forest Hills, New York, beating Dušan Vemić 7–6 (7), 6–2 in the final. That September, he beat Florent Serra of France 6–2, 6–2 in the quarterfinals, and Alex Bogomolov Jr. 6–1, 6–3 in the final of a hard court tournament in Beijing. He also won the doubles event at both of these tournaments, and a singles title at Nashville in November.

Gimelstob made it to the finals in the hard court tournament in Tallahassee in April 2005,. At Wimbledon that year, Gimelstob defeated 29th seed Nicolás Massú in the 2nd round 6–3, 4–6, 7–6 (7–5), 7–6 (7–0). He was eliminated in the 3rd round by Lleyton Hewitt (seeded 3rd) 7–6 (7–5), 6–4, 7–5. In 2006, Gimelstob reached his first ATP Tour Singles Final at The Hall of Fame Championships in Newport, Rhode Island, losing to Mark Philippoussis. In March 2006 he defeated world # 39 Feliciano López, 7–5. 6–3, in Indian Wells. In May he defeated world # 32 Nicolás Massú, 2–6, 7–6 (7–3), 6–4, in the Portugal, and in July he defeated world # 36 Andy Murray, 6–1, 7–6 (4), in the semifinals at Newport, Rhode Island.

In September 2006 he had back surgery to remove two large disc fragments that were putting pressure on the nerves to his right leg, causing him to lose sensation.

In June 2007, Gimelstob lost a contentious 6–4 vote of the ATP Players Council in his attempt to replace Andre Agassi's manager, Perry Rogers, on the men's tour's 3-man board of directors, and to become the first active player on the board.

Gimelstob retired from professional tennis in the fall of 2007. His highest world singles ranking was # 63, and in doubles, # 18. In his final singles major, he was defeated by Andy Roddick in the first round of the 2007 U.S. Open, 7–6, 6–3, 6–3. He also played doubles in the 2007 US open. After retirement, he pursued a career in sports commentary, working for Tennis Channel. He resigned from his position at the Tennis Channel after being convicted of assaulting an acquaintance.

=== Jewish heritage ===
Gimelstob is Jewish. His father Gary was an assistant coach of Team USA's tennis squad at the 1981 Maccabiah Games in Israel. Asked in 2003, in the wake of a Vanity Fair magazine article about increased anti-Semitism in France, whether he had been the brunt of anti-Semitism while he was in France for the French Open, he responded that he was uncertain. "They're so impolite and rude in general, you don't know if they think I'm Jewish or whether I'm just another American tourist".

He is a member of the Southern California Jewish Sports Hall of Fame in 2003. He was inducted into the MetroWest Jewish Sports Hall of Fame in New Jersey in 2006.

He said he was proud to be a Jewish role model. He added: "When I played, I got a lot of support from the Jewish community. People identify me as a Jewish athlete. It's a strong responsibility, and I appreciate that."

=== Davis Cup ===
Gimelstob played for the US Davis Cup team in 1998 and 2001.

== Grand Slam finals ==
=== Mixed doubles: 2 (2 titles) ===
Result	Year	Championship	Surface	Partner	Opponents	Score
Win	1998	Australian Open	Hard	(United States) Venus Williams	(Czech Republic) Helena Suková (Czech Republic) Cyril Suk	6–2, 6–1
Win	1998	French Open	Clay	(United States) Venus Williams	(United States) Serena Williams (Argentina) Luis Lobo	6–4, 6–4

== ATP Tour career finals ==
=== Singles: 1 (1 runner-up) ===
Legend Grand Slam tournaments (0–0) ATP World Tour Finals (0–0) ATP World Tour Masters Series (0–0) ATP World Tour Championship Series (0–0) ATP World Tour International Series (0–1)	Finals by surface Hard (0–0) Clay (0–0) Grass (0–1)	Finals by setting Outdoor (0–1) Indoor (0–0)

Result	W–L	Date	Tournament	Tier	Surface	Opponent	Score
Loss	0–1	Jul 2006	Newport, United States	International Series	Grass	(Australia) Mark Philippoussis	3–6, 5–7

=== Doubles: 17 (13 titles, 4 runner-ups) ===
Legend Grand Slam tournaments (0–0) ATP World Tour Finals (0–0) ATP World Tour Masters Series (0–0) ATP World Tour Championship Series (3–0) ATP World Tour World/International Series (10–4)	Finals by surface Hard (8–1) Clay (1–2) Grass (3–1) Carpet (1–0)	Finals by setting Outdoor (10–4) Indoor (3–0)

Result	W–L	Date	Tournament	Tier	Surface	Partner	Opponents	Score
Win	1–0	Jul 1997	Newport, United States	World Series	Grass	(Australia) Brett Steven	(United States) Kent Kinnear (North Macedonia) Aleksandar Kitinov	6–3, 6–4
Win	2–0	Jun 1998	Nottingham, United Kingdom	World Series	Grass	(South Africa) Byron Talbot	(Canada) Daniel Nestor (Canada) Sébastien Lareau	7–5, 6–7, 6–4
Win	3–0	Mar 1999	Scottsdale, United States	World Series	Hard	(United States) Richey Reneberg	(The Bahamas) Mark Knowles (Australia) Sandon Stolle	6–4, 6–7, 6–3
Win	4–0	May 1999	Atlanta, United States	World Series	Clay	(United States) Patrick Galbraith	(Australia) Todd Woodbridge (Australia) Mark Woodforde	5–7, 7–6, 6–3
Win	5–0	Jun 1999	Nottingham, United Kingdom	World Series	Grass	(United States) Patrick Galbraith	(South Africa) Marius Barnard (South Africa) Brent Haygarth	5–7, 7–5, 6–3
Win	6–0	Aug 1999	Washington, United States	Championship Series	Hard	(Canada) Sébastien Lareau	(South Africa) David Adams (South Africa) John-Laffnie de Jager	7–5, 6–7, 6–3
Win	7–0	Nov 1999	Moscow, Russia	World Series	Carpet	(Czech Republic) Daniel Vacek	(Ukraine) Andrei Medvedev (Russia) Marat Safin	6–2, 6–1
Win	8–0	Feb 2000	Memphis, United States	Championship Series	Hard	(Canada) Sébastien Lareau	(United States) Jim Grabb (United States) Richey Reneberg	6–2, 6–4
Loss	8–1	Apr 2000	Atlanta, United States	World Series	Clay	(The Bahamas) Mark Knowles	(South Africa) Ellis Ferreira (United States) Rick Leach	3–6, 4–6
Loss	8–2	May 2000	Orlando, United States	World Series	Clay	(Canada) Sébastien Lareau	(India) Leander Paes (Netherlands) Jan Siemerink	3–6, 4–6
Win	9–2	Sep 2000	Tashkent, Uzbekistan	International Series	Hard	(United States) Scott Humphries	(South Africa) Marius Barnard (South Africa) Robbie Koenig	6–3, 6–2
Loss	9–3	Jul 2002	Los Angeles, United States	World Series	Hard	(France) Michaël Llodra	(France) Sébastien Grosjean (Germany) Nicolas Kiefer	4–6, 4–6
Win	10–3	Oct 2003	Tokyo, Japan	Championship Series	Hard	(Germany) Nicolas Kiefer	(United States) Scott Humphries (The Bahamas) Mark Merklein	6–7^{(6–8)}, 6–3, 7–6^{(7–4)}
Win	11–3	Sep 2004	Beijing, China	International Series	Hard	(United States) Graydon Oliver	(United States) Taylor Dent (United States) Alex Bogomolov Jr.	4–6, 6–4, 7–6^{(8–6)}
Win	12–3	Oct 2004	Thailand Open, Thailand	International Series	Hard	(United States) Graydon Oliver	(Switzerland) Roger Federer (Switzerland) Yves Allegro	5–7, 6–4, 6–4
Win	13–3	Sep 2005	Beijing, China	International Series	Hard	(Australia) Nathan Healey	(Russia) Dmitry Tursunov (Russia) Mikhail Youzhny	4–6, 6–3, 6–2
Loss	13–4	Jul 2006	Newport, United States	International Series	Grass	(South Africa) Jeff Coetzee	(Austria) Jürgen Melzer (United States) Robert Kendrick	6–7^{(3–7)}, 0–6

== ATP Challenger and ITF Futures finals ==
=== Singles: 16 (9–7) ===
Legend ATP Challenger (9–7) ITF Futures (0–0)	Finals by surface Hard (8–7) Clay (0–0) Grass (1–0) Carpet (0–0)

Result	W–L	Date	Tournament	Tier	Surface	Opponent	Score
Win	1–0	Sep 1996	Urbana-Champaign, United States	Challenger	Hard	(United States) Steve Bryan	5–7, 6–3, 6–4
Win	2–0	Nov 1996	Andorra la Vella, Andorra	Challenger	Hard	(Australia) Sandon Stolle	6–4, 6–2
Win	3–0	Nov 1998	Andorra la Vella, Andorra	Challenger	Hard	(Switzerland) George Bastl	6–3, 2–6, 7–6
Win	4–0	Nov 1999	Andorra la Vella, Andorra	Challenger	Hard	(Belarus) Max Mirnyi	4–6, 7–6, 7–5
Loss	4–1	Aug 2000	Lexington, United States	Challenger	Hard	(Japan) Takao Suzuki	1–2 ret.
Loss	4–2	Jun 2001	Tallahassee, United States	Challenger	Hard	(Paraguay) Ramón Delgado	5–7, 3–6
Loss	4–3	Jun 2002	Tallahassee, United States	Challenger	Hard	(United States) Brian Vahaly	6–7^{(5–7)}, 4–6
Loss	4–4	Oct 2002	Fresno, United States	Challenger	Hard	(Australia) Scott Draper	1–6, 7–6^{(7–5)}, 1–6
Loss	4–5	Feb 2003	Dallas, United States	Challenger	Hard	(Germany) Simon Greul	3–6, 6–7^{(5–7)}
Win	5–5	Jun 2004	Forest Hills, United States	Challenger	Grass	(Serbia and Montenegro) Dušan Vemić	7–6^{(9–7)}, 6–2
Win	6–5	Sep 2004	Beijing, China	Challenger	Hard	(United States) Alex Bogomolov Jr.	6–1, 6–3
Win	7–5	Nov 2004	Nashville, United States	Challenger	Hard	(United States) Amer Delić	7–6^{(7–3)}, 7–6^{(7–4)}
Win	8–5	Nov 2004	Urbana-Champaign, United States	Challenger	Hard	(Paraguay) Ramón Delgado	6–4, 6–4
Loss	8–6	Apr 2005	Tallahassee, United States	Challenger	Hard	(United States) Brian Vahaly	4–6, 0–6
Win	9–6	Oct 2005	Carson, United States	Challenger	Hard	(United States) Amer Delić	7–6^{(7–5)}, 6–2
Loss	9–7	Nov 2005	Champaign Urbana, United States	Challenger	Hard	(Thailand) Danai Udomchoke	5–7, 2–6

== ATP Challenger and ITF Futures finals ==
=== Doubles: 22 (12–10) ===
Legend ATP Challenger (12–10) ITF Futures (0–0)	Finals by surface Hard (11–8) Clay (0–0) Grass (1–1) Carpet (0–1)

Result	W–L	Date	Tournament	Tier	Surface	Partner	Opponents	Score
Win	1–0	Aug 1996	Binghamton, United States	Challenger	Hard	(United States) Jeff Salzenstein	(United States) David Di Lucia (United States) Kenny Thorne	6–2, 6–4
Loss	1–1	Dec 1996	Amarillo, United States	Challenger	Hard	(United States) Jeff Salzenstein	(Belarus) Max Mirnyi (South Africa) Kevin Ullyett	3–6, 4–6
Win	2–1	Dec 1996	Daytona Beach, United States	Challenger	Hard	(United States) Jeff Salzenstein	(United States) Mark Merklein (United States) Chad Clark	7–6, 3–6, 7–5
Loss	2–2	Nov 1998	Brest, France	Challenger	Hard	(United States) Brian Macphie	(South Africa) Neville Godwin (South Africa) Marcos Ondruska	4–6, 7–5, 4–6
Win	3–2	Nov 1998	Andorra La Vella, Andorra	Challenger	Hard	(United States) Jack Waite	(Italy) Vincenzo Santopadre (Italy) Massimo Ardinghi	2–6, 6–4, 6–3
Loss	3–3	Jan 1999	Heilbronn, Germany	Challenger	Carpet	(United States) Chris Woodruff	(Germany) Michael Kohlmann (Switzerland) Filippo Veglio	4–6, 7–5, 5–7
Loss	3–4	Jun 1999	Surbiton, United Kingdom	Challenger	Grass	(United States) Scott Humphries	(Australia) Todd Woodbridge (Australia) Scott Draper	walkover
Win	4–4	Dec 2001	Rio de Janeiro, Brazil	Challenger	Hard	(Australia) David Macpherson	(Germany) Michael Kohlmann (Austria) Julian Knowle	7–6^{(7–5)}, 6–3
Loss	4–5	Jan 2002	Waikoloa, United States	Challenger	Hard	(United States) James Blake	(United States) Glenn Weiner (Romania) Gabriel Trifu	4–6, 6–4, 4–6
Win	5–5	Feb 2002	Joplin, United States	Challenger	Hard	(United States) Scott Humphries	(United States) Glenn Weiner (South Africa) Paul Rosner	6–4, 7–6^{(7–3)}
Loss	5–6	Apr 2002	Calabasas, United States	Challenger	Hard	(United States) Paul Goldstein	(United States) Glenn Weiner (South Africa) Paul Rosner	2–6, 6–4, 6–7^{(4–7)}
Win	6–6	Feb 2003	Dallas, United States	Challenger	Hard	(United States) Scott Humphries	(Argentina) Martin Garcia (United States) Graydon Oliver	7–6^{(9–7)}, 7–6^{(7–4)}
Win	7–6	Apr 2003	Calabasas, United States	Challenger	Hard	(United States) Scott Humphries	(United States) Jim Thomas (United States) Kevin Kim	6–3, 6–3
Win	8–6	May 2003	Forest Hills, United States	Challenger	Hard	(United States) Scott Humphries	(United States) Tripp Phillips (United States) Huntley Montgomery	7–6^{(7–1)}, 3–6, 6–4
Win	9–6	Oct 2003	Tiburon, United States	Challenger	Hard	(United States) Brandon Coupe	(United States) Robert Kendrick (United States) Diego Ayala	0–6, 6–3, 7–6^{(7–3)}
Win	10–6	Jun 2004	Forest Hills, United States	Challenger	Grass	(United States) Brandon Coupe	(United States) Travis Rettenmaier (Australia) Michael Tebbutt	6–4, 6–4
Loss	10–7	Sep 2004	Beijing, China	Challenger	Hard	(United States) Graydon Oliver	(Australia) Ashley Fisher (United States) Tripp Phillips	5–7, 5–7
Loss	10–8	Nov 2004	Champaign Urbana, United States	Challenger	Hard	(United States) Graydon Oliver	(United States) Brian Baker (United States) Rajeev Ram	6–7^{(5–7)}, 6–7^{(7–9)}
Loss	10–9	May 2005	Busan, South Korea	Challenger	Hard	(South Africa) Wesley Moodie	(United States) Paul Goldstein (United States) Rajeev Ram	walkover
Win	11–9	Jun 2005	Yuba City, United States	Challenger	Hard	(United States) Brandon Coupe	(Mexico) Santiago González (Brazil) Bruno Soares	6–2, 3–6, 7–6^{(7–1)}
Loss	11–10	Nov 2005	Champaign Urbana, United States	Challenger	Hard	(United States) Rajeev Ram	(Australia) Ashley Fisher (United States) Tripp Phillips	3–6, 7–5, 0–6
Win	12–10	Jul 2006	Córdoba, Spain	Challenger	Hard	(United States) Kevin Kim	(Slovakia) Ivo Klec (Czech Republic) Jan Mertl	6–3, 7–5

== Junior Grand Slam finals ==
=== Doubles: 1 (1 runner-up) ===
Result	Year	Championship	Surface	Partner	Opponent	Score
Loss	1995	French Open	Clay	(United States) Ryan Wolters	(Netherlands) Raemon Sluiter (Netherlands) Peter Wessels	6–7, 5–7

== Grand Slam tournament performance timelines ==
Key
W	F	SF	QF	#R	RR	Q#	DNQ	A	NH

(W) winner; (F) finalist; (SF) semifinalist; (QF) quarterfinalist; (#R) rounds 4, 3, 2, 1; (RR) round-robin stage; (Q#) qualification round; (DNQ) did not qualify; (A) absent; (NH) not held; (SR) strike rate (events won / competed); (W–L) win–loss record.

=== Singles ===
Tournament	1993	1994	1995	1996	1997	1998	1999	2000	2001	2002	2003	2004	2005	2006	2007	SR	W–L	Win %
Australian Open	A	A	A	A	1R	1R	2R	A	1R	Q2	1R	A	1R	1R	A	0 / 7	1–7	14%
French Open	A	A	A	A	Q1	Q1	1R	1R	A	A	1R	A	A	1R	1R	0 / 5	0–5	0%
Wimbledon	A	A	A	Q1	2R	2R	1R	3R	A	Q3	3R	Q3	3R	2R	1R	0 / 8	9–8	53%
US Open	Q1	Q1	2R	Q1	3R	1R	3R	2R	2R	2R	1R	Q1	1R	2R	1R	0 / 11	9–11	45%
Win–loss	0–0	0–0	1–1	0–0	3–3	1–3	3–4	3–3	1–2	1–1	2–4	0–0	2–3	2–4	0–3	0 / 31	19–31	38%

=== Doubles ===
Tournament	1995	1996	1997	1998	1999	2000	2001	2002	2003	2004	2005	2006	2007	SR	W–L	Win %
Australian Open	A	A	A	QF	1R	A	SF	1R	A	A	1R	QF	A	0 / 6	9–6	60%
French Open	A	A	1R	1R	1R	1R	A	A	1R	A	A	1R	1R	0 / 7	0–7	0%
Wimbledon	A	A	2R	QF	3R	3R	A	1R	2R	QF	1R	2R	2R	0 / 10	14–10	58%
US Open	1R	1R	2R	2R	3R	1R	1R	2R	1R	3R	1R	2R	3R	0 / 13	10–12	45%
Win–loss	0–1	0–1	2–2	7–4	4–4	2–3	3–2	1–3	1–3	5–2	0–3	5–4	3–3	0 / 36	33–35	49%
ATP Tour Masters 1000
Indian Wells	A	A	Q2	A	1R	1R	1R	A	A	A	A	2R	A	0 / 4	1–4	20%
Miami Open	A	2R	1R	A	1R	QF	3R	2R	A	A	2R	1R	A	0 / 8	6–8	43%
Canada Masters	A	A	1R	A	1R	A	1R	A	A	A	A	A	A	0 / 3	0–3	0%
Cincinnati Masters	A	A	A	3R	1R	A	2R	A	A	A	2R	2R	A	0 / 5	5–5	50%
Paris Masters	A	A	A	A	QF	A	A	A	A	A	A	A	A	0 / 1	2–1	67%
Win–loss	0–0	1–1	0–2	2–1	2–5	2–2	2–4	1–1	0–0	0–0	2–2	2–3	0–0	0 / 21	14–21	40%

=== Mixed doubles ===
Tournament	1997	1998	1999	2000	2001	2002	2003	2004	2005	2006	2007	SR	W–L	Win %
Australian Open	A	W	A	A	A	A	A	A	A	A	A	1 / 1	5–0	100%
French Open	A	W	A	A	A	A	A	A	A	A	A	1 / 1	6–0	100%
Wimbledon	2R	SF	QF	2R	A	A	A	A	1R	2R	A	0 / 6	10–6	63%
US Open	1R	QF	A	A	1R	SF	1R	A	1R	SF	QF	0 / 8	10–8	56%
Win–loss	1–2	17–2	3–1	1–1	0–1	3–1	0–1	0–0	0–2	4–2	2–1	2 / 16	31–14	69%

== Post-playing career ==
Gimelstob was a blogger for Sports Illustrated (under the name "Gimel Takes All"), and served as a regular commentator for Tennis Channel. In 2010, Gimelstob was suspended from his Tennis Channel commentating duties for comments he made about President Barack Obama. He also presented tennis features and interviews for the TV Guide channel.

Gimelstob was one of the three ATP board representatives elected by the ATP player council. On May 1, 2019, Gimelstob resigned from the ATP Player Council after a series of controversies (see below) and subsequent pressure from Stan Wawrinka and Andy Murray. He also resigned from his job at the Tennis Channel.

John Isner hired Gimelstob as his new coach at the end of the 2014 season and worked with him until April 2016.

== Controversies ==
=== Sexist comments ===
On June 17, 2008, when Gimelstob was a guest on the Washington, D.C., morning radio show The Sports Junkies, he referred to French tennis player Tatiana Golovin as a "sexpot", Czech player Nicole Vaidišová as a "well developed young lady", and French player Alizé Cornet as a "little sexpot".

Also in 2008, Gimelstob told Out Magazine: "The locker room couldn't be a more homophobic place. We're not gay-bashing. There's just a lot of positive normal hetero talk about pretty girls and working out and drinking beer. That's why people want to be pro athletes!"

=== Domestic abuse allegations ===
In 2016, Gilmelstob's wife Cary sought a restraining order against him, alleging that he "physically assaulted, harassed, verbally attacked, and stole" from her. Cary also accused Justin of a placing a "video recording device in my bedroom" which captured "me having sex with another man" and that Justin threatened to show the footage to the couple's son.

=== Assault case ===
In November 2018, Gimelstob was charged with assault after being accused of repeatedly striking Randall Kaplan while the venture capitalist, his wife and their two-year-old daughter were trick-or-treating on Halloween in West Los Angeles. Gimelstob denied the accusations. Gilmelstob later changed his plea to "no contest" to a felony battery charge, and was sentenced to three years’ probation and 60 days of community labor. The wife of the victim attributed the miscarriage of her unborn child to the stress of witnessing the attack. In 2019, he resigned from the ATP board of directors.

== See also ==
- List of select Jewish tennis players
