= Nathan Healey =

Australian tennis player

- Country (sports): Australia
- Born: 27 February 1980 (age 46) Gosford, Australia
- Height: 180 cm (5 ft 11 in)
- Turned pro: 1998
- Plays: Right-handed
- Prize money: $552,190

Singles
- Career record: 6–13
- Career titles: 0
- Highest ranking: No. 159 (15 January 2007)

Grand Slam singles results
- Australian Open: 3R (2006)
- French Open: 1R (2006)

Doubles
- Career record: 55–73
- Career titles: 3
- Highest ranking: No. 58 (3 February 2003)

Grand Slam doubles results
- Australian Open: 2R (2000, 2001, 2003, 2007)
- French Open: 1R (2002, 2003, 2006)
- Wimbledon: 1R (2002, 2003, 2004)
- US Open: 3R (2002)

Nathan Healey (born 27 February 1980 in Gosford, New South Wales) is an Australian tennis player.

Turning professional in 1998, Healey has won 3 doubles titles.

In 2006, he earned a wildcard to the Australian Open, making the 3rd round, where he was defeated by Russian Nikolay Davydenko in four sets. Later that year, he made it to the 3rd qualifying round at Wimbledon, where he was soundly defeated by Robert Kendrick. As of 26 June 2006, Healey was 199th in the ATP rankings.

In January 2007 Healey substituted for Mark Philippoussis after the latter sustained a knee injury during the Hopman Cup in Perth. He lost a close match against American Mardy Fish, but then teamed with Alicia Molik to win the mixed doubles against Fish and Ashley Harkleroad.

Healey is married to Marnie Heller of Wyomissing, Pennsylvania.

In August 2009, he became the coach of fellow tennis player and former world number 1., Lleyton Hewitt; replacing Tony Roche. Healey resigned as Hewitt's coach for family reasons in August 2010.

Nathan relocated to the Philadelphia area to be close to his family in 2010 and started working with local juniors. Nathan was drafted in 2011 to play for the Philadelphia Freedoms of the WTT..

He currently coaches ATP player Max Purcell.

== Career finals ==
=== Doubles: 6 (3–3) ===
Result	W/L	Date	Tournament	Surface	Partner	Opponents	Score
Win	1–0	Jul 2001	Sopot, Poland	Clay	(Australia) Paul Hanley	(Georgia (country)) Irakli Labadze (Hungary) Attila Sávolt	7–6^{(12–10)}, 6–2
Loss	1–1	Oct 2001	Tokyo, Japan	Hard	(Australia) Paul Hanley	(United States) Rick Leach (Australia) David Macpherson	5–7, 6–7^{(2–7)}
Loss	1–2	Sep 2002	Sopot, Poland	Clay	(South Africa) Jeff Coetzee	(Czech Republic) František Čermák (Czech Republic) Leoš Friedl	5–7, 5–7
Win	2–2	Jan 2003	Sydney, Australia	Hard	(Australia) Paul Hanley	(India) Mahesh Bhupathi (Australia) Joshua Eagle	7–6^{(7–3)}, 6–4
Win	3–2	Sep 2005	Beijing, China	Hard	(United States) Justin Gimelstob	(Russia) Dmitry Tursunov (Russia) Mikhail Youzhny	4–6, 6–3, 6–2
Loss	3–3	Jul 2007	Newport, United States	Hard	(Russia) Igor Kunitsyn	(Australia) Jordan Kerr (United States) Jim Thomas	3–6, 5–7
