= 2004 Australian Open – Men's singles qualifying =

Men's singles qualifying
- 2004 Australian Open

Events
Singles	men	women		boys	girls
Doubles	men	women	mixed	boys	girls
WC Singles	men	women	quad
WC Doubles	men	women	quad
Legends	men	women	mixed

Qualification
Singles	men	women
- Australian Open

This article displays the qualifying draw for men's singles at the 2004 Australian Open.

== Seeds ==
1. (United States) Paul Goldstein (first round)
2. (Israel) Harel Levy (second round)
3. (Denmark) Kenneth Carlsen (qualified)
4. (Spain) Fernando Verdasco (qualified)
5. (Argentina) Martín Vassallo Argüello (second round, retired)
6. (United States) Alex Bogomolov Jr. (qualified)
7. (France) Olivier Mutis (moved to main draw)
8. (Ecuador) Giovanni Lapentti (first round)
9. (Czech Republic) Jan Vacek (qualifying competition, lucky loser)
10. (Peru) Iván Miranda (qualifying competition, lucky loser)
11. (Italy) Stefano Pescosolido (second round)
12. (Brazil) Ricardo Mello (qualified)
13. (United States) Jeff Salzenstein (qualified)
14. (Switzerland) Michel Kratochvil (qualifying competition)
15. (United States) Eric Taino (first round)
16. (Belgium) Gilles Elseneer (first round)
17. (Switzerland) Ivo Heuberger (second round)
18. (France) Julien Benneteau (qualifying competition)
19. (Austria) Werner Eschauer (qualifying competition)
20. (Spain) Marc López (second round)
21. (Spain) Álex Calatrava (first round)
22. (Germany) Daniel Elsner (second round)
23. (Czech Republic) Tomáš Zíb (first round)
24. (Italy) Giorgio Galimberti (first round)
25. (Austria) Alexander Peya (qualifying competition)
26. (Romania) Răzvan Sabău (first round)
27. (Czech Republic) Jiří Vaněk (qualifying competition)
28. (Germany) Björn Phau (first round)
29. (United States) Jeff Morrison (qualified)
30. (Italy) Alessio di Mauro (qualifying competition)
31. (Thailand) Danai Udomchoke (second round)
32. (Austria) Julian Knowle (first round)

== Qualifiers ==
1. (Croatia) Roko Karanušić
2. (Germany) Florian Mayer
3. (Denmark) Kenneth Carlsen
4. (Spain) Fernando Verdasco
5. (United States) Cecil Mamiit
6. (United States) Alex Bogomolov Jr.
7. (Czech Republic) Tomáš Berdych
8. (Czech Republic) Michal Tabara
9. (France) Jérôme Golmard
10. (France) Olivier Patience
11. (United States) Jeff Morrison
12. (Brazil) Ricardo Mello
13. (United States) Jeff Salzenstein
14. (Luxembourg) Gilles Müller
15. (France) Sébastien de Chaunac
16. (United States) Glenn Weiner

== Lucky losers ==
1. (Czech Republic) Jan Vacek
2. (Peru) Iván Miranda

== Draw ==
=== First qualifier ===
First round
1	(United States) Paul Goldstein	6^{2}	7	4
(Croatia) Roko Karanušić	7^{7}	5	6
(Brazil) Marcos Daniel	6	6
(Switzerland) Stanislas Wawrinka	4	4
(Serbia and Montenegro) Janko Tipsarević	3	6	0
(South Africa) Rik de Voest	6	3	6
(Paraguay) Ramón Delgado	6^{7}	6^{3}
30	(Italy) Alessio di Mauro	7^{9}	7^{7}

Second round
(Croatia) Roko Karanušić	2	6	6
(Brazil) Marcos Daniel	6	4	4
(South Africa) Rik de Voest	3	1
30	(Italy) Alessio di Mauro	6	6

Qualifying competition
(Croatia) Roko Karanušić	5	7^{7}	6
30	(Italy) Alessio di Mauro	7	6^{5}	0

=== Second qualifier ===
First round
2	(Israel) Harel Levy	6	7
(France) Slimane Saoudi	2	5
(Germany) Florian Mayer	6	6
(Chinese Taipei) Lu Yen-hsun	0	4
(Greece) Konstantinos Economidis	7^{7}	7
(United States) Alex Kim	6^{5}	5
(Germany) Simon Greul	3	5
20	(Spain) Marc López	6	7

Second round
2	(Israel) Harel Levy	2	4
(Germany) Florian Mayer	6	6
(Greece) Konstantinos Economidis	4	6	8
20	(Spain) Marc López	6	2	6

Qualifying competition
(Germany) Florian Mayer	6	6
(Greece) Konstantinos Economidis	1	1

=== Third qualifier ===
First round
3	(Denmark) Kenneth Carlsen	3	6	6
(Austria) Oliver Marach	6	4	3
(Slovakia) Michal Mertiňák	3	6	3
(Japan) Takao Suzuki	6	4	6
(South Africa) Louis Vosloo	4	6	6
(Japan) Gouichi Motomura	6	4	3
WC	(Australia) Joseph Sirianni	2	6^{12}
25	(Austria) Alexander Peya	6	7^{14}

Second round
3	(Denmark) Kenneth Carlsen	6	7^{7}
(Japan) Takao Suzuki	4	6^{4}
(South Africa) Louis Vosloo	4	3
25	(Austria) Alexander Peya	6	6

Qualifying competition
3	(Denmark) Kenneth Carlsen	6	6
25	(Austria) Alexander Peya	3	4

=== Fourth qualifier ===
First round
4	(Spain) Fernando Verdasco	6	6
(Finland) Timo Nieminen	2	1
(Germany) Marcello Craca	3	6	3
(Croatia) Željko Krajan	6	2	6
(Italy) Tomas Tenconi	0	0
(Greece) Vasilis Mazarakis	6	6
(France) Florent Serra	4	3
19	(Austria) Werner Eschauer	6	6

Second round
4	(Spain) Fernando Verdasco	6	3	6
(Croatia) Željko Krajan	2	6	4
(Greece) Vasilis Mazarakis	6	3	5
19	(Austria) Werner Eschauer	2	6	7

Qualifying competition
4	(Spain) Fernando Verdasco	7^{9}	7^{7}
19	(Austria) Werner Eschauer	6^{7}	6^{4}

=== Fifth qualifier ===
First round
5	(Argentina) Martín Vassallo Argüello	4	6	6
(Italy) Stefano Cobolli	6	4	3
(Italy) Massimo Dell'Acqua	3	4
(United States) Cecil Mamiit	6	6
(Israel) Noam Okun	7^{7}	1	7
(Sweden) Björn Rehnquist	6^{1}	6	5
(Austria) Markus Hipfl	4	2
27	(Czech Republic) Jiří Vaněk	6	6

Second round
5	(Argentina) Martín Vassallo Argüello	1	0^{r}
(United States) Cecil Mamiit	6	2
(Israel) Noam Okun	7^{7}	2	4
27	(Czech Republic) Jiří Vaněk	6^{4}	6	6

Qualifying competition
(United States) Cecil Mamiit	6	6
27	(Czech Republic) Jiří Vaněk	3	2

=== Sixth qualifier ===
First round
6	(United States) Alex Bogomolov Jr.	6	6
(United States) Zack Fleishman	2	0
(Russia) Andrei Stoliarov	6	3	6
(Czech Republic) František Čermák	3	6	3
(Czech Republic) Jan Hernych	6	4	5
(Italy) Andreas Seppi	4	6	7
(United Kingdom) Alex Bogdanovic	6	6
26	(Romania) Răzvan Sabău	4	2

Second round
6	(United States) Alex Bogomolov Jr.	6	6
(Russia) Andrei Stoliarov	0	1
(Italy) Andreas Seppi	6	7
(United Kingdom) Alex Bogdanovic	2	5

Qualifying competition
6	(United States) Alex Bogomolov Jr.	6	6
(Italy) Andreas Seppi	2	4

=== Seventh qualifier ===
First round
Alt	(Czech Republic) Tomáš Berdych	6	1
(Argentina) Gastón Etlis	2	1^{r}
(Spain) Francisco Fogués	6	6
(Italy) Daniele Bracciali	4	1
(Costa Rica) Juan Antonio Marín	4	2
(Argentina) Diego Veronelli	6	6
(Czech Republic) Tomáš Cakl	6	7
28	(Germany) Björn Phau	2	5

Second round
Alt	(Czech Republic) Tomáš Berdych	7	7^{7}
(Spain) Francisco Fogués	5	6^{2}
(Argentina) Diego Veronelli	7	3	3
(Czech Republic) Tomáš Cakl	5	6	6

Qualifying competition
Alt	(Czech Republic) Tomáš Berdych	6	6
(Czech Republic) Tomáš Cakl	4	4

=== Eighth qualifier ===
First round
8	(Ecuador) Giovanni Lapentti	6	3	4
(Spain) Guillermo García-López	4	6	6
PR	(Argentina) Cristian Kordasz	3	4
(Czech Republic) Michal Tabara	6	6
(Netherlands) Fred Hemmes Jr.	4	6	8
(Argentina) Juan Pablo Guzmán	6	4	6
WC	(Australia) Robert Smeets	6	6^{6}	3
22	(Germany) Daniel Elsner	4	7^{8}	6

Second round
(Spain) Guillermo García-López	5	1
(Czech Republic) Michal Tabara	7	6
(Netherlands) Fred Hemmes Jr.	6	3
22	(Germany) Daniel Elsner	3	0^{r}

Qualifying competition
(Czech Republic) Michal Tabara	6	6
(Netherlands) Fred Hemmes Jr.	3	0

=== Ninth qualifier ===
First round
9	(Czech Republic) Jan Vacek	6^{3}	7	6
(Colombia) Alejandro Falla	7^{7}	5	1
(Spain) Óscar Serrano	6	3	4
(Argentina) Andrés Dellatorre	3	6	6
(Italy) Potito Starace	4	6	3
(Switzerland) George Bastl	6	4	6
PR	(France) Jérôme Golmard	6	6
32	(Austria) Julian Knowle	4	3

Second round
9	(Czech Republic) Jan Vacek	6	6
(Argentina) Andrés Dellatorre	2	0
(Switzerland) George Bastl	3	6^{4}
PR	(France) Jérôme Golmard	6	7^{7}

Qualifying competition
9	(Czech Republic) Jan Vacek	3	2
PR	(France) Jérôme Golmard	6	6

=== Tenth qualifier ===
First round
10	(Peru) Iván Miranda	4	6	6
(Argentina) Mariano Delfino	6	3	1
(France) Stéphane Robert	6	1	8
(Switzerland) Stéphane Bohli	2	6	6
(Germany) Maximilian Abel	3	6^{2}
(France) Olivier Patience	6	7^{7}
(Brazil) Franco Ferreiro	7^{7}	6
24	(Italy) Giorgio Galimberti	6^{3}	3

Second round
10	(Peru) Iván Miranda	3	6	6
(France) Stéphane Robert	6	4	4
(France) Olivier Patience	6	6
(Brazil) Franco Ferreiro	1	4

Qualifying competition
10	(Peru) Iván Miranda	2	3
(France) Olivier Patience	6	6

=== Eleventh qualifier ===
First round
11	(Italy) Stefano Pescosolido	6	6
(Argentina) Sergio Roitman	3	3
(Netherlands) Peter Wessels	6^{4}	0^{r}
(Israel) Amir Hadad	7^{7}	0
(Germany) Markus Hantschk	6^{5}	4
WC	(Australia) Andrew Derer	7^{7}	6
(Brazil) André Sá	2	4
29	(United States) Jeff Morrison	6	6

Second round
11	(Italy) Stefano Pescosolido	3	1
(Israel) Amir Hadad	6	6
WC	(Australia) Andrew Derer	4	4
29	(United States) Jeff Morrison	6	6

Qualifying competition
(Israel) Amir Hadad	4	2
29	(United States) Jeff Morrison	6	6

=== Twelfth qualifier ===
First round
12	(Brazil) Ricardo Mello	6	6
WC	(Australia) Domenic Marafiote	4	2
(Austria) Daniel Köllerer	4	6	7
WC	(Australia) Raphael Durek	6	4	5
(Czech Republic) Petr Kralert	6	6
(Russia) Igor Kunitsyn	3	3
(Argentina) Diego Moyano	7^{7}	6^{5}	2
17	(Switzerland) Ivo Heuberger	6^{2}	7^{7}	6

Second round
12	(Brazil) Ricardo Mello	2	6	6
(Austria) Daniel Köllerer	6	2	2
(Czech Republic) Petr Kralert	2	7^{7}	6
17	(Switzerland) Ivo Heuberger	6	6^{4}	1

Qualifying competition
12	(Brazil) Ricardo Mello	6	6
(Czech Republic) Petr Kralert	2	3

=== Thirteenth qualifier ===
First round
13	(United States) Jeff Salzenstein	6	7
(Chinese Taipei) Wang Yeu-tzuoo	4	5
(United States) Hugo Armando	6	6
WC	(Australia) Luke Bourgeois	4	2
(Argentina) Juan Pablo Brzezicki	6	6
WC	(Australia) Jaymon Crabb	1	2
(Serbia and Montenegro) Boris Pašanski	4^{r}
18	(France) Julien Benneteau	3

Second round
13	(United States) Jeff Salzenstein	7^{7}	6^{3}	6
(United States) Hugo Armando	6^{3}	7^{7}	3
(Argentina) Juan Pablo Brzezicki	6^{5}	6	5
18	(France) Julien Benneteau	7^{7}	1	7

Qualifying competition
13	(United States) Jeff Salzenstein	6	6
18	(France) Julien Benneteau	0	3

=== Fourteenth qualifier ===
First round
14	(Switzerland) Michel Kratochvil	6	6
(Canada) Frédéric Niemeyer	4	4
(France) Nicolas Coutelot	6	6^{0}	6
(Chile) Hermes Gamonal	2	7^{7}	3
(Luxembourg) Gilles Müller	4	7^{7}	6
(Canada) Simon Larose	6	6^{2}	3
WC	(Australia) Adam Kennedy	2	2
31	(Thailand) Danai Udomchoke	6	6

Second round
14	(Switzerland) Michel Kratochvil	7	7^{7}
(France) Nicolas Coutelot	5	6^{2}
(Luxembourg) Gilles Müller	6	6
31	(Thailand) Danai Udomchoke	3	4

Qualifying competition
14	(Switzerland) Michel Kratochvil	4	3
(Luxembourg) Gilles Müller	6	6

=== Fifteenth qualifier ===
First round
15	(United States) Eric Taino	6	2	5
(Italy) Paolo Lorenzi	3	6	7
(France) Sébastien de Chaunac	4	6	6
WC	(Australia) Ryan Henry	6	4	2
(Bulgaria) Ivaylo Traykov	4	3
(Belgium) Kristof Vliegen	6	6
(Canada) Frank Dancevic	6	7
21	(Spain) Álex Calatrava	0	5

Second round
(Italy) Paolo Lorenzi	2	7	1
(France) Sébastien de Chaunac	6	5	6
(Belgium) Kristof Vliegen	3	6	7
(Canada) Frank Dancevic	6	3	5

Qualifying competition
(France) Sébastien de Chaunac	6	4	6
(Belgium) Kristof Vliegen	4	6	3

=== Sixteenth qualifier ===
First round
16	(Belgium) Gilles Elseneer	6^{10}	5
(Norway) Jan Frode Andersen	7^{12}	7
(United Kingdom) Arvind Parmar	7	1	7
(United States) Kevin Kim	5	6	9
(Spain) Salvador Navarro	1	2
(Spain) Juan Albert Viloca	6	6
(United States) Glenn Weiner	6	7^{7}
23	(Czech Republic) Tomáš Zíb	4	6^{4}

Second round
(Norway) Jan Frode Andersen	4	6	4
(United States) Kevin Kim	6	3	6
(Spain) Juan Albert Viloca	7^{13}	3	4
(United States) Glenn Weiner	6^{11}	6	6

Qualifying competition
(United States) Kevin Kim	1	3
(United States) Glenn Weiner	6	6
