= 2004 Australian Open – Women's singles qualifying =

Women's singles qualifying
- 2004 Australian Open

Events
Singles	men	women		boys	girls
Doubles	men	women	mixed	boys	girls
WC Singles	men	women	quad
WC Doubles	men	women	quad
Legends	men	women	mixed

Qualification
Singles	men	women
- Australian Open

This article displays the qualifying draw for the Women's singles at the 2004 Australian Open.

== Seeds ==
1. (United States) Lindsay Lee-Waters (qualifying competition, lucky loser)
2. (Germany) Julia Schruff (first round)
3. (Germany) Anna-Lena Grönefeld (qualifying competition)
4. (Italy) Roberta Vinci (qualifying competition)
5. (Ukraine) Yuliya Beygelzimer (second round)
6. (Bosnia and Herzegovina) Mervana Jugić-Salkić (second round)
7. (Belarus) Tatiana Poutchek (first round)
8. (Russia) Maria Kirilenko (first round)
9. (Argentina) Gisela Dulko (qualified)
10. (United States) Shenay Perry (qualified)
11. (China) Sun Tiantian (qualifying competition)
12. (United States) Meilen Tu (second round)
13. (Slovakia) Eva Fislová (second round)
14. (Ukraine) Elena Tatarkova (first round)
15. (Estonia) Maret Ani (first round)
16. (Colombia) Catalina Castaño (second round)
17. (Japan) Yuka Yoshida (first round)
18. (Italy) Mara Santangelo (qualified)
19. (Spain) Nuria Llagostera Vives (first round)
20. (France) Séverine Brémond (qualifying competition)
21. (Czech Republic) Barbora Strýcová (qualified)
22. (United States) Marissa Irvin (first round)
23. (Croatia) Ivana Abramović (withdrew)
24. (Austria) Sybille Bammer (qualifying competition)

== Qualifiers ==
1. (Israel) Tzipora Obziler
2. (Argentina) Mariana Díaz Oliva
3. (Czech Republic) Libuše Průšová
4. (Germany) Angelika Bachmann
5. (Czech Republic) Barbora Strýcová
6. (United States) Jennifer Hopkins
7. (Italy) Mara Santangelo
8. (Canada) Marie-Ève Pelletier
9. (Argentina) Gisela Dulko
10. (United States) Shenay Perry
11. (Ukraine) Yuliana Fedak
12. (France) Camille Pin

== Lucky loser ==
1. (United States) Lindsay Lee-Waters

== Qualifying draw ==
Key

- Q = Qualifier
- WC = Wild card
- LL = Lucky loser
- Alt = Alternate
- ITF = ITF entry
- PR = Protected ranking
- SR = Special ranking
- SE = Special exempt
- JE = Junior exempt
- JR = Junior Accelerator Programme entrant
- CO = College Accelerator Programme entrant
- NG = Next Gen Accelerator Program entrant
- w/o = Walkover
- r = Retired
- d = Defaulted

=== First qualifier ===
First round
1	(United States) Lindsay Lee-Waters	6	6
(Bulgaria) Lubomira Bacheva	3	3
WC	(Australia) Lauren Breadmore	6	6
WC	(Australia) Lara Giltinan	2	2
(Bulgaria) Svetlana Krivencheva	1	6	2
(Netherlands) Elise Tamaëla	6	4	6
(Israel) Tzipora Obziler	6^{4}	6	7
14	(Ukraine) Elena Tatarkova	7^{7}	4	5

Second round
1	(United States) Lindsay Lee-Waters	6	6
WC	(Australia) Lauren Breadmore	4	4
(Netherlands) Elise Tamaëla	3	6^{1}
(Israel) Tzipora Obziler	6	7^{7}

Qualifying competition
1	(United States) Lindsay Lee-Waters	6	1	7
(Israel) Tzipora Obziler	4	6	9

=== Second qualifier ===
First round
2	(Germany) Julia Schruff	4	1
(Germany) Sandra Klösel	6	6
(Czech Republic) Renata Voráčová	2	6	4
(Croatia) Darija Jurak	6	3	6
(United States) Abigail Spears	2	6	2
(United States) Bethanie Mattek	6	3	6
(Argentina) Mariana Díaz Oliva	6	7^{10}
Alt	(United States) Diana Ospina	4	6^{8}

Second round
(Germany) Sandra Klösel	6	6
(Croatia) Darija Jurak	1	3
(United States) Bethanie Mattek	1	3
(Argentina) Mariana Díaz Oliva	6	6

Qualifying competition
(Germany) Sandra Klösel	3	2
(Argentina) Mariana Díaz Oliva	6	6

=== Third qualifier ===
First round
3	(Germany) Anna-Lena Grönefeld	6^{2}	6	6
(Brazil) Maria Fernanda Alves	7^{7}	4	3
WC	(Australia) Adriana Szili	2	2
(Estonia) Kaia Kanepi	6	6
(Austria) Patricia Wartusch	2	2
(Czech Republic) Libuše Průšová	6	6
(Slovakia) Zuzana Kučová	4	1
16	(Colombia) Catalina Castaño	6	6

Second round
3	(Germany) Anna-Lena Grönefeld	6	6
(Estonia) Kaia Kanepi	3	4
(Czech Republic) Libuše Průšová	6	6
16	(Colombia) Catalina Castaño	4	4

Qualifying competition
3	(Germany) Anna-Lena Grönefeld	2	6^{3}
(Czech Republic) Libuše Průšová	6	7^{7}

=== Fourth qualifier ===
First round
4	(Italy) Roberta Vinci	6	4	7
(Germany) Adriana Barna	3	6	5
(Russia) Galina Voskoboeva	6	6
(Belarus) Nadejda Ostrovskaya	3	4
(Germany) Angelika Bachmann	6	6
(France) Kildine Chevalier	2	1
(Slovakia) Jarmila Gajdošová	6	6
22	(United States) Marissa Irvin	3	3

Second round
4	(Italy) Roberta Vinci	6	6
(Russia) Galina Voskoboeva	2	1
(Germany) Angelika Bachmann	6	7
(Slovakia) Jarmila Gajdošová	3	5

Qualifying competition
4	(Italy) Roberta Vinci	6	2	2
(Germany) Angelika Bachmann	2	6	6

=== Fifth qualifier ===
First round
5	(Ukraine) Yuliya Beygelzimer	4	7	6
(Japan) Aiko Nakamura	6	5	1
(Australia) Christina Wheeler	5	4
(Czech Republic) Iveta Benešová	7	6
(Russia) Anastasia Rodionova	7^{7}	6
(United States) Angela Haynes	6^{5}	1
(Slovakia) Stanislava Hrozenská	3	5
21	(Czech Republic) Barbora Strýcová	6	7

Second round
5	(Ukraine) Yuliya Beygelzimer	2	3
(Czech Republic) Iveta Benešová	6	6
(Russia) Anastasia Rodionova	0	1
21	(Czech Republic) Barbora Strýcová	6	6

Qualifying competition
(Czech Republic) Iveta Benešová	3	0
21	(Czech Republic) Barbora Strýcová	6	6

=== Sixth qualifier ===
First round
6	(Bosnia and Herzegovina) Mervana Jugić-Salkić	6	6
(Russia) Evgenia Kulikovskaya	1	3
(Czech Republic) Dája Bedáňová	6^{2}	6^{4}
(Argentina) Natalia Gussoni	7^{7}	7^{7}
(United States) Jennifer Hopkins	6	6
WC	(Australia) Bojana Bobusic	1	3
(Puerto Rico) Vilmarie Castellvi	2	3
13	(Slovakia) Eva Fislová	6	6

Second round
6	(Bosnia and Herzegovina) Mervana Jugić-Salkić	4	2
(Argentina) Natalia Gussoni	6	6
(United States) Jennifer Hopkins	6	6
13	(Slovakia) Eva Fislová	2	2

Qualifying competition
(Argentina) Natalia Gussoni	3	3
(United States) Jennifer Hopkins	6	6

=== Seventh qualifier ===
First round
7	(Belarus) Tatiana Poutchek	6^{6}	2
(Czech Republic) Lenka Němečková	7^{8}	6
WC	(Australia) Jaslyn Hewitt	3	2
(Hungary) Kira Nagy	6	6
(Romania) Andreea Vanc	4	4
(Croatia) Ivana Lisjak	6	6
(Indonesia) Wynne Prakusya	2	1
18	(Italy) Mara Santangelo	6	6

Second round
(Czech Republic) Lenka Němečková	7	6
(Hungary) Kira Nagy	5	2
(Croatia) Ivana Lisjak	2	0
18	(Italy) Mara Santangelo	6	6

Qualifying competition
(Czech Republic) Lenka Němečková	2	2
18	(Italy) Mara Santangelo	6	6

=== Eighth qualifier ===
First round
8	(Russia) Maria Kirilenko	4	4
(Canada) Marie-Ève Pelletier	6	6
(Slovakia) Janette Husárová	6	7^{7}
(Hungary) Rita Kuti-Kis	1	6^{2}
(South Korea) Jeon Mi-ra	7^{7}	4	6
(China) Yan Zi	6^{5}	6	3
(Tunisia) Selima Sfar	2	6	3
24	(Austria) Sybille Bammer	6	4	6

Second round
(Canada) Marie-Ève Pelletier	6	6
(Slovakia) Janette Husárová	4	3
(South Korea) Jeon Mi-ra	2	2
24	(Austria) Sybille Bammer	6	6

Qualifying competition
(Canada) Marie-Ève Pelletier	6	4	6
24	(Austria) Sybille Bammer	3	6	4

=== Ninth qualifier ===
First round
9	(Argentina) Gisela Dulko	6	6
(Belarus) Olga Barabanschikova	4	4
(Australia) Amanda Grahame	4	4
(Russia) Lioudmila Skavronskaia	6	6
(United Kingdom) Anne Keothavong	7	1	4
(Germany) Stephanie Gehrlein	5	6	6
(South Africa) Natalie Grandin	6	6
17	(Japan) Yuka Yoshida	2	2

Second round
9	(Argentina) Gisela Dulko	6	6
(Russia) Lioudmila Skavronskaia	4	0
(Germany) Stephanie Gehrlein	6	3	7
(South Africa) Natalie Grandin	0	6	5

Qualifying competition
9	(Argentina) Gisela Dulko	6	5	6
(Germany) Stephanie Gehrlein	2	7	4

=== Tenth qualifier ===
First round
10	(United States) Shenay Perry	5	6	9
(Russia) Galina Fokina	7	3	7
WC	(Australia) Dubravka Cupac	2	1
(Ukraine) Alona Bondarenko	6	6
(United States) Mashona Washington	1	7	6
(Czech Republic) Olga Blahotová	6	5	0
(Hungary) Katalin Marosi	6	6
19	(Spain) Nuria Llagostera Vives	3	4

Second round
10	(United States) Shenay Perry	7^{8}	1	6
(Ukraine) Alona Bondarenko	6^{6}	6	0
(United States) Mashona Washington	5	6	7
(Hungary) Katalin Marosi	7	4	5

Qualifying competition
10	(United States) Shenay Perry	3	7^{8}	6
(United States) Mashona Washington	6	6^{6}	2

=== Eleventh qualifier ===
First round
11	(China) Sun Tiantian	6	6
(Ukraine) Mariya Koryttseva	2	1
(Germany) Nina Dübbers	3	1
(Republic of Ireland) Kelly Liggan	6	6
(Ukraine) Yuliana Fedak	6	7^{7}
(Germany) Angelika Rösch	4	6^{2}
(Chinese Taipei) Janet Lee	4	6	9
15	(Estonia) Maret Ani	6	0	7

Second round
11	(China) Sun Tiantian	7	6
(Republic of Ireland) Kelly Liggan	5	4
(Ukraine) Yuliana Fedak	6	2	7
(Chinese Taipei) Janet Lee	1	6	5

Qualifying competition
11	(China) Sun Tiantian	4	6	3
(Ukraine) Yuliana Fedak	6	3	6

=== Twelfth qualifier ===
First round
12	(United States) Meilen Tu	6	6
WC	(Australia) Monique Adamczak	1	3
(France) Camille Pin	6	6
(Russia) Evgenia Linetskaya	3	3
WC	(Australia) Christina Horiatopoulos	5	2
(France) Virginie Pichet	7	6
(Hungary) Zsófia Gubacsi	4	1
20	(France) Séverine Brémond	6	6

Second round
12	(United States) Meilen Tu	6	3	5
(France) Camille Pin	3	6	7
(France) Virginie Pichet	3	4
20	(France) Séverine Brémond	6	6

Qualifying competition
(France) Camille Pin	7	6
20	(France) Séverine Brémond	5	0
