= 2004 Australian Open – Girls' singles =

Girls' singles
- 2004 Australian Open

Final
- Champion: (Israel) Shahar Pe'er
- Runner-up: (Czech Republic) Nicole Vaidišová
- Score: 6–1, 6–4

Events
Singles	men	women		boys	girls
Doubles	men	women	mixed	boys	girls
WC Singles	men	women	quad
WC Doubles	men	women	quad
Legends	men	women	mixed
- Australian Open

Shahar Pe'er won the title, defeating Nicole Vaidišová in the final, 6–1, 6–4.

Barbora Strýcová was the defending champion, but chose to participate in the women's qualifying competition. She qualified for the main draw where she lost to 23rd seed Lina Krasnoroutskaya in the second round.

== Seeds ==
1. (Slovakia) Jarmila Gajdošová (semifinals)
2. (Czech Republic) Veronika Chvojková (third round)
3. (Czech Republic) Nicole Vaidišová (final)
4. (Chinese Taipei) Yung-Jan Chan (first round)
5. (Serbia and Montenegro) Vojislava Lukić (third round)
6. (New Zealand) Marina Erakovic (second round)
7. (Serbia and Montenegro) Ana Ivanovic (quarterfinals)
8. (China) Sheng-Nan Sun (third round)
9. (Russia) Alla Kudryavtseva (quarterfinals)
10. (Slovenia) Maša Zec-Peškirič (first round)
11. (Croatia) Sanja Ančić (first round)
12. (Canada) Stéphanie Dubois (quarterfinals)
13. (Israel) Shahar Pe'er (champion)
14. (Switzerland) Timea Bacsinszky (semifinals)
15. (China) Rui Du (second round)
16. (Egypt) Heidi El Tabakh (first round)

== Draw ==
Key

- Q = Qualifier
- WC = Wild card
- LL = Lucky loser
- Alt = Alternate
- ITF = ITF entry
- PR = Protected ranking
- SR = Special ranking
- SE = Special exempt
- JE = Junior exempt
- JR = Junior Accelerator Programme entrant
- CO = College Accelerator Programme entrant
- NG = Next Gen Accelerator Program entrant
- w/o = Walkover
- r = Retired
- d = Defaulted

=== Finals ===
Quarterfinals
1	(Slovakia) Jarmila Gajdošová	7^{10}	6
(Germany) Angelique Kerber	6^{8}	3
3	(Czech Republic) Nicole Vaidišová	1	6	6
7	(Serbia and Montenegro) Ana Ivanovic	6	1	3
12	(Canada) Stéphanie Dubois	4	0
13	(Israel) Shahar Pe'er	6	6
9	(Russia) Alla Kudryavtseva	3	6	2
14	(Switzerland) Timea Bacsinszky	6	4	6

Semifinals
1	(Slovakia) Jarmila Gajdošová	5	3
3	(Czech Republic) Nicole Vaidišová	7	6
13	(Israel) Shahar Pe'er	7^{9}	7
14	(Switzerland) Timea Bacsinszky	6^{7}	5

Final
3	(Czech Republic) Nicole Vaidišová	1	4
13	(Israel) Shahar Pe'er	6	6

=== Top half ===
==== Section 1 ====
First round
1	(Slovakia) Jarmila Gajdošová	6	6
WC	(Australia) Michelle Brycki	1	0
(United States) Yasmin Schnack	6	6
(Sweden) Mari Andersson	3	3
(Australia) Natalie Tanevska	6	6
(Chinese Taipei) Wen-Hsin Hsu	3	2
(Russia) Ekaterina Kosminskaya	5	5
15	(China) Rui Du	7	7
11	(Croatia) Sanja Ančić	6	5	5
(Poland) Marta Leśniak	4	7	7
WC	(Australia) Lara Picone	6	2	6
(South Africa) Kate Mcdade	3	6	3
Q	(Canada) Eunice David	1	1
(Germany) Angelique Kerber	6	6
(Australia) Jessica Engels	2	2
6	(New Zealand) Marina Erakovic	6	6

Second round
1	(Slovakia) J Gajdošová	6	6
(United States) Y Schnack	4	0
(Australia) N Tanevska	6	7
15	(China) R Du	3	5
(Poland) M Leśniak	6	4	6
WC	(Australia) L Picone	4	6	2
(Germany) A Kerber	6	6
6	(New Zealand) M Erakovic	3	2

Third round
1	(Slovakia) J Gajdošová	6	6
(Australia) N Tanevska	1	1
(Poland) M Leśniak
(Germany) A Kerber	w/o

Quarterfinals
1	(Slovakia) J Gajdošová	7^{10}	6
(Germany) A Kerber	6^{8}	3

==== Section 2 ====
First round
3	(Czech Republic) Nicole Vaidišová	6	6
(Australia) Bojana Bobusic	2	1
WC	(Australia) Shayna McDowell	2	6	0
Q	(United States) Lindsay Burdette	6	1	6
Q	(Indonesia) Ayu-Fani Damayanti	2	4
(China) Yan-Chong Chen	6	6
WC	(Australia) Dubravka Cupac	5	6	7
16	(Egypt) Heidi El Tabakh	7	4	5
10	(Slovenia) Maša Zec-Peškirič	3	2
Q	(Japan) Yurika Sema	6	6
(United States) Michelle Mitchell	2	3
(Canada) Katarina Zoricic	6	6
(Austria) Stefanie Rath	3	0
(South Korea) So-Jung Kim	6	6
(France) Anna-Maria Zubori	1	1
7	(Serbia and Montenegro) Ana Ivanovic	6	6

Second round
3	(Czech Republic) N Vaidišová	6	6
Q	(United States) L Burdette	0	2
(China) Y-C Chen	6	6
WC	(Australia) D Cupac	3	2
Q	(Japan) Y Sema	6	6
(Canada) K Zoricic	4	3
(South Korea) S-J Kim	2	2
7	(Serbia and Montenegro) A Ivanovic	6	6

Third round
3	(Czech Republic) N Vaidišová	6	6
(China) Y-C Chen	2	1
Q	(Japan) Y Sema	3	1
7	(Serbia and Montenegro) A Ivanovic	6	6

Quarterfinals
3	(Czech Republic) N Vaidišová	1	6	6
7	(Serbia and Montenegro) A Ivanovic	6	1	3

=== Bottom half ===
==== Section 3 ====
First round
8	(China) Sheng-Nan Sun	6	6
WC	(Australia) Tyra Calderwood	4	1
(United States) Jennifer Elie	4	3
(India) Sanaa Bhambri	6	6
(Italy) Verdiana Verardi	4	6	6
(Germany) Nina Henkel	6	4	0
(Australia) Daniella Dominikovic	6^{5}	2
12	(Canada) Stéphanie Dubois	7^{7}	6
13	(Israel) Shahar Pe'er	6	6
(Australia) Olivia Lukaszewicz	0	0
WC	(Australia) Sophie Ferguson	6	6
WC	(Australia) Julianne Welford	2	3
(United States) Mary Gambale	7^{7}	6
Q	(Russia) Anastasia Sourkova	6^{2}	1
LL	(Sweden) Michaela Johansson	6	1	9
4	(Chinese Taipei) Yung-Jan Chan	1	6	7

Second round
8	(China) S-N Sun	6	7
(India) S Bhambri	0	5
(Italy) V Verardi	6	4	4
12	(Canada) S Dubois	4	6	6
13	(Israel) S Pe'er	3	6	6
WC	(Australia) S Ferguson	6	1	1
(United States) M Gambale	6^{8}	7^{9}	5
LL	(Sweden) M Johansson	7^{10}	6^{7}	7

Third round
8	(China) S-N Sun	0	2
12	(Canada) S Dubois	6	6
13	(Israel) S Pe'er	6	6
LL	(Sweden) M Johansson	1	2

Quarterfinals
12	(Canada) S Dubois	4	0
13	(Israel) S Pe'er	6	6

==== Section 4 ====
First round
5	(Serbia and Montenegro) Vojislava Lukić	6	6
Q	(New Zealand) Shona Lee	3	4
(United States) Katrina Tsang	6	6
WC	(Australia) Holly Cao	3	4
Q	(Australia) Jessica Hoath	2	3
(Australia) Lara Giltinan	6	6
(China) Shuai Zhang	0	2
9	(Russia) Alla Kudryavtseva	6	6
14	(Switzerland) Timea Bacsinszky	6	6
(United States) Yvette Hyndman	1	2
(Germany) Sarah Raab	1	4
Q	(United States) Vania King	6	6
(Canada) Mélanie Gloria	6^{6}	6^{8}
(China) Wan-Ting Liu	7^{8}	7^{10}
(Poland) Magdalena Kiszczyńska	6^{5}	0
2	(Czech Republic) Veronika Chvojková	7^{7}	6

Second round
5	(Serbia and Montenegro) V Lukić	6	6
(United States) K Tsang	3	4
(Australia) L Giltinan	3	2
9	(Russia) A Kudryavtseva	6	6
14	(Switzerland) T Bacsinszky	6	6
Q	(United States) V King	0	4
(China) W-T Liu	0	2
2	(Czech Republic) V Chvojková	6	6

Third round
5	(Serbia and Montenegro) V Lukić	0	6	1
9	(Russia) A Kudryavtseva	6	0	6
14	(Switzerland) T Bacsinszky	7^{8}	6
2	(Czech Republic) V Chvojková	7^{6}	3

Quarterfinals
9	(Russia) A Kudryavtseva	3	6	2
14	(Switzerland) T Bacsinszky	6	4	6

== Sources ==
- Draw
