= Monique Adamczak =

Australian tennis player

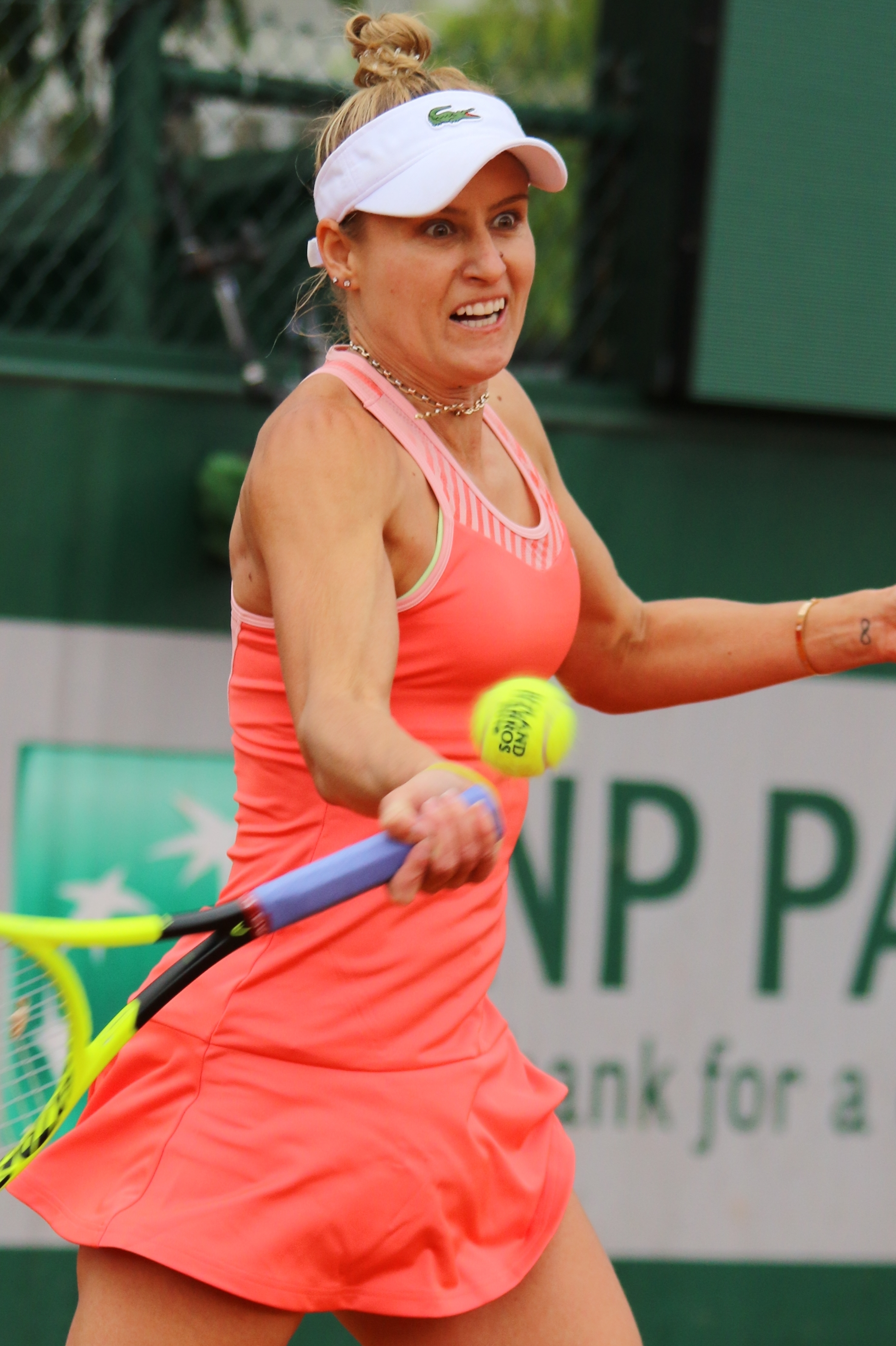
- Adamczak at the 2019 French Open
- Country (sports): Australia
- Residence: Sydney, Australia
- Born: 21 January 1983 (age 42); Kensington, New South Wales
- Height: 1.70 m (5 ft 7 in)
- Turned pro: 1998
- Plays: Right-handed
- Prize money: US$ 789,645

Singles
- Career record: 378–326
- Career titles: 8 ITF
- Highest ranking: No. 138 (19 April 2010)

Grand Slam singles results
- Australian Open: 2R (2007)
- French Open: Q1 (2007, 2008, 2013)
- Wimbledon: Q2 (2007, 2009)
- US Open: 1R (2009)

Doubles
- Career record: 367–271
- Career titles: 2 WTA, 32 ITF
- Highest ranking: No. 44 (19 February 2018)

Grand Slam doubles results
- Australian Open: 3R (2014)
- French Open: 1R (2018)
- Wimbledon: 2R (2017)
- US Open: 2R (2018, 2019)

Grand Slam mixed doubles results
- Australian Open: 2R (2007)
- Wimbledon: 2R (2019)
- Last updated on: 11 June 2024.

Monique Adamczak (born 21 January 1983) is an inactive Australian tennis player. Her favourite surface is grass. She has specialised in doubles and has been coached by Tony Roche, former coach of Roger Federer.

Adamczak made her debut as a professional in 1998, aged 15, at an ITF tournament in Lyneham. On her way to the quarterfinals she defeated Alicia Molik.

She won her first title in September 2000 on grass at the ITF Jaipur in India, defeating home favourite Manisha Malhotra, in three sets. It was here that she also won her first doubles title, partnering with Jennifer Schmidt.

At the 2009 US Open, Adamczak qualified for the singles event, losing to Alizé Cornet in the first round, in a tight three-setter.

At the 2014 Australian Open, Adamczak partnering Olivia Rogowska, reached the third round, losing to the first seeds Sara Errani and Roberta Vinci.

== WTA Challenger finals ==
=== Doubles: 1 (runner-up) ===
| Result | Date | Tournament | Surface | Partner | Opponents | Score |
|---|---|---|---|---|---|---|
| Loss | Nov 2017 | Taipei Challenger, Taiwan | Carpet (i) | (United Kingdom) Naomi Broady | (Russia) Veronika Kudermetova (Belarus) Aryna Sabalenka | 6–2, 6–7^{(5–7)}, [6–10] |

== WTA Tour finals ==
=== Doubles: 7 (2 titles, 5 runner-ups) ===
Legend
Grand Slam
WTA 1000
WTA 500
WTA 250 (2–5)

| Result | W–L | Date | Tournament | Tier | Surface | Partner | Opponents | Score |
|---|---|---|---|---|---|---|---|---|
| Win | 1–0 | Jun 2017 | Nottingham Open, UK | International (Note: The WTA International tournaments were reclassified as WTA 250 tournaments in 2021.) | Grass | (Australia) Storm Sanders | (United Kingdom) Jocelyn Rae (United Kingdom) Laura Robson | 6–4, 4–6, [10–4] |
| Loss | 1–1 | Sep 2017 | Japan Women's Open | International | Hard | (Australia) Storm Sanders | (Japan) Shuko Aoyama (China) Yang Zhaoxuan | 0–6, 6–2, [5–10] |
| Loss | 1–2 | Sep 2017 | Guangzhou Open, China | International | Hard | (Australia) Storm Sanders | (Belgium) Elise Mertens (Netherlands) Demi Schuurs | 2–6, 3–6 |
| Win | 2–2 | Sep 2018 | Guangzhou Open, China | International | Hard | (Australia) Jessica Moore | (Montenegro) Danka Kovinić (Belarus) Vera Lapko | 4–6, 7–5, [10–4] |
| Loss | 2–3 | Oct 2018 | Tianjin Open, China | International | Hard | (Australia) Jessica Moore | (United States) Nicole Melichar (Czech Republic) Květa Peschke | 4–6, 2–6 |
| Loss | 2–4 | Apr 2019 | Monterrey Open, Mexico | International | Hard | (Australia) Jessica Moore | (United States) Asia Muhammad (United States) Maria Sanchez | 6–7^{(2–7)}, 4–6 |
| Loss | 2–5 | Jul 2019 | Lausanne Open, Switzerland | International | Clay | (China) Han Xinyun | (Russia) Anastasia Potapova (Russia) Yana Sizikova | 2–6, 4–6 |

== Performance timeline ==
Key
| W | F | SF | QF | #R | RR | Q# | DNQ | A | NH |

(W) winner; (F) finalist; (SF) semifinalist; (QF) quarterfinalist; (#R) rounds 4, 3, 2, 1; (RR) round-robin stage; (Q#) qualification round; (DNQ) did not qualify; (A) absent; (NH) not held; (SR) strike rate (events won / competed); (W–L) win–loss record.
To avoid confusion and double counting, these charts are updated at the conclusion of a tournament or when the player's participation has ended.

=== Singles ===
| Tournament | 1999 | 2000 | 2001 | 2002 | 2003 | 2004 | 2005 | 2006 | 2007 | 2008 | 2009 | 2010 | 2011 | 2012 | 2013 | 2014 | 2015 | W–L |
|---|---|---|---|---|---|---|---|---|---|---|---|---|---|---|---|---|---|---|
Grand Slam tournaments
| Australian Open | Q2 | Q1 | Q1 | A | A | Q1 | 1R | Q1 | 2R | 1R | Q1 | Q1 | Q1 | Q1 | Q2 | A | A | 1–3 |
| French Open | A | A | A | A | A | A | A | A | Q1 | Q1 | A | A | A | A | Q1 | A | A | 0–0 |
| Wimbledon | A | A | A | A | A | A | A | A | Q2 | Q1 | Q2 | A | A | Q1 | A | A | A | 0–0 |
| US Open | A | A | A | A | A | A | A | A | Q2 | Q1 | 1R | A | A | Q1 | Q1 | A | A | 0–1 |
| Win–loss | 0–0 | 0–0 | 0–0 | 0–0 | 0–0 | 0–0 | 0-1 | 0–0 | 1–1 | 0–1 | 0–1 | 0–0 | 0–0 | 0–0 | 0–0 | 0–0 | 0–0 | 1–4 |
WTA 1000 + former
| Canadian Open | A | A | A | A | A | A | A | A | A | 1R | A | A | Q1 | A | A | A | A | 0–1 |
| Cincinnati Open | A | A | A | A | A | A | A | A | 1R | A | A | A | A | A | A | A | A | 0–1 |
| Charleston Open | A | A | A | A | A | A | A | A | A | 1R | A | A | A | A | A | A | A | 0–1 |

=== Doubles ===
| Tournament | 2000 | ... | 2004 | 2005 | 2006 | 2007 | 2008 | 2009 | 2010 | 2011 | 2012 | 2013 | 2014 | 2015 | 2016 | 2017 | 2018 | 2019 | 2020 | 2021 | 2022 | SR | W–L |
|---|---|---|---|---|---|---|---|---|---|---|---|---|---|---|---|---|---|---|---|---|---|---|---|
Grand Slam tournaments
| Australian Open | 1R | | 1R | A | 2R | 1R | 1R | 1R | 1R | 1R | 1R | 1R | 3R | 2R | A | A | 1R | 2R | 1R | A | 2R | 0 / 16 | 6–16 |
| French Open | A | | A | A | A | A | A | A | A | A | A | A | A | A | A | A | 1R | 1R | A | A | A | 0 / 2 | 0–2 |
| Wimbledon | A | | A | A | A | A | A | A | A | A | A | A | Q1 | A | A | 2R | 1R | 1R | NH | A | 1R | 0 / 4 | 1–4 |
| US Open | A | | A | A | A | A | A | A | A | A | A | A | A | A | A | A | 2R | 1R | A | A | A | 0 / 2 | 1–2 |
| Win–loss | 0–1 | | 0–1 | 0–0 | 1–1 | 0–1 | 0–1 | 0–1 | 0–1 | 0–1 | 0–1 | 0–1 | 2–1 | 1–1 | 0–0 | 1–1 | 1–4 | 1–4 | 0–1 | 0–0 | 1–1 | 0 / 24 | 8–24 |
WTA 1000 + former
| Dubai / Qatar Open (Note: The first Premier 5 event of the year has switched back and forth between the Dubai Tennis Championships and the Qatar Ladies Open since 2009. Dubai was classified as a Premier 5 event from 2009 to 2011 before being succeeded by Doha for the 2012–2014 period. In 2015, Dubai regained its Premier 5 status while Doha was demoted to Premier status. The Premier 5 tournaments were reclassified as WTA 1000 tournaments in 2021.) | A | | A | A | A | A | A | A | A | A | A | A | A | A | A | A | SF | A | A | A | A | 0 / 1 | 3–1 |
| Indian Wells Open | A | | A | A | A | A | A | A | A | A | A | A | A | A | A | A | 1R | A | NH | A | A | 0 / 1 | 0–1 |
| Miami Open | A | | A | A | A | A | A | A | A | A | A | A | A | A | A | A | 1R | A | NH | A | A | 0 / 1 | 0–1 |
| Madrid Open | A | | A | A | A | A | A | A | A | A | A | A | A | A | A | A | 1R | A | NH | A | A | 0 / 1 | 0–1 |
| Italian Open | A | | A | A | A | A | A | A | A | A | A | A | A | A | A | A | 1R | A | A | A | A | 0 / 1 | 0–1 |
| Canadian Open | A | | A | A | A | A | 1R | A | A | A | A | A | A | A | A | A | A | 1R | NH | A | A | 0 / 2 | 0–2 |
| Cincinnati Open | A | | A | A | A | QF | A | A | A | A | A | A | A | A | A | A | 1R | 2R | A | A | A | 0 / 3 | 2–3 |
| Pan Pacific / Wuhan Open (Note: In 2014, the Pan Pacific Open was downgraded to a Premier event and replaced by the Wuhan Open. The Premier 5 tournaments were reclassified as WTA 1000 tournaments in 2021.) | A | | A | A | A | A | A | A | A | A | A | A | A | A | A | A | A | 1R | NH | | | 0 / 1 | 0–1 |
| China Open | A | | A | A | A | A | A | A | A | A | A | A | A | A | A | A | 1R | 1R | NH | | A | 0 / 2 | 0–2 |
| Charleston Open | A | | A | A | A | A | 1R | Not Tier I | | | | | | | | | | | | | | 0 / 1 | 0–1 |

== ITF Circuit finals ==
Legend
$100,000 tournaments
$75,000 tournaments
$50/60,000 tournaments
$25,000 tournaments
$10/15,000 tournaments

=== Singles: 19 (8–11) ===
| Result | No. | Date | Tournament | Tier | Surface | Opponent | Score |
|---|---|---|---|---|---|---|---|
| Win | 1. | 3 September 2000 | ITF Jaipur, India | 10,000 | Grass | (India) Manisha Malhotra | 6–2, 2–6, 6–3 |
| Win | 2. | 9 March 2003 | ITF Warrnambool, Australia | 10,000 | Grass | (Australia) Lauren Breadmore | 6–2, 4–6, 6–3 |
| Win | 3. | 23 March 2003 | ITF Yarrawonga, Australia | 10,000 | Grass | (Chinese Taipei) Chan Chin-wei | 6–3, 7–6^{(4)} |
| Win | 4. | 17 August 2003 | ITF Oulu, Finland | 10,000 | Clay | (Ukraine) Kateryna Bondarenko | 6–3, 6–4 |
| Loss | 1. | 19 March 2006 | ITF Canberra, Australia | 25,000 | Clay | (Slovakia) Jarmila Gajdošová | 6–7^{(5)}, 2–6 |
| Loss | 2. | 20 May 2006 | ITF Tenerife, Spain | 25,000 | Hard | (Czech Republic) Andrea Hlaváčková | 6–3, 3–6, 3–6 |
| Loss | 3. | 9 July 2006 | ITF Valladolid, Spain | 25,000 | Hard | (Spain) Estrella Cabeza Candela | 6–2, 6–7^{(3)}, 5–7 |
| Loss | 4. | 18 November 2007 | ITF Nuriootpa, Australia | 25,000 | Hard | (France) Irena Pavlovic | 2–6, 7–5, 4–6 |
| Win | 5. | 14 September 2008 | ITF Rockhampton, Australia | 25,000 | Hard | (Slovakia) Jarmila Gajdošová | 4–6, 6–2, 7–6^{(4)} |
| Win | 6. | 24 May 2009 | ITF Santos, Brazil | 25,000 | Clay | (Argentina) Aranza Salut | 6–2, 6–1 |
| Win | 7. | 25 July 2009 | ITF Kharkiv, Ukraine | 25,000 | Clay | (Croatia) Tereza Mrdeža | 5–7, 6–1, 6–4 |
| Win | 8. | 21 March 2010 | ITF Irapuato, Mexico | 25,000 | Hard | (Japan) Misaki Doi | 7–6^{(5)}, 2–6, 6–2 |
| Loss | 5. | 9 May 2011 | Kurume Cup, Japan | 50,000 | Grass | (Japan) Rika Fujiwara | 3–6, 1–6 |
| Loss | 6. | 16 October 2011 | ITF Kalgoorlie, Australia | 25,000 | Hard | (Australia) Casey Dellacqua | 2–6, 2–6 |
| Loss | 7. | 13 May 2012 | Fukuoka International, Japan | 50,000 | Grass | (Australia) Casey Dellacqua | 4–6, 1–6 |
| Loss | 8. | 20 May 2012 | Kurume Cup, Japan | 50,000 | Grass | (China) Zheng Saisai | 5–7, 2–6 |
| Loss | 9. | 15 October 2012 | ITF Makinohara, Japan | 25,000 | Grass | (United States) Alexa Glatch | 3–6, 4–6 |
| Loss | 10. | 22 October 2012 | ITF Hamamatsu, Japan | 25,000 | Grass | (United States) Alexa Glatch | 2–6, 3–6 |
| Loss | 11. | 2 February 2013 | Burnie International, Australia | 25,000 | Hard | (Australia) Olivia Rogowska | 6–7^{(5)}, 7–6^{(7)}, 4–6 |

=== Doubles: 54 (32–22) ===
| Outcome | No. | Date | Tournament | Tier | Surface | Partner | Opponents | Score |
|---|---|---|---|---|---|---|---|---|
| Winner | 1. | 3 September 2000 | ITF Jaipur, India | 10,000 | Grass | (Austria) Jennifer Schmidt | (India) Rushmi Chakravarthi (India) Sai Jayalakshmy Jayaram | 6–3, 1–6, 7–5 |
| Winner | 2. | 18 March 2001 | ITF Benalla, Australia | 10,000 | Grass | (Australia) Samantha Stosur | (Netherlands) Debbie Haak (Netherlands) Jolanda Mens | 6–3, 7–5 |
| Winner | 3. | 3 March 2003 | ITF Warrnambool, Australia | 10,000 | Grass | (Germany) Madita Suer | (Chinese Taipei) Chuang Chia-jung (New Zealand) Ilke Gers | 6–4, 6–4 |
| Runner-up | 1. | 7 September 2003 | ITF Mestre, Italy | 10,000 | Clay | (New Zealand) Shelley Stephens | (New Zealand) Leanne Baker (Italy) Francesca Lubiani | 2–6, 6–4, 2–6 |
| Runner-up | 2. | 9 May 2004 | Fukuoka International, Japan | 50,000 | Grass | (Australia) Nicole Kriz | (Japan) Rika Fujiwara (Japan) Saori Obata | 2–6, 4–6 |
| Runner-up | 3. | 17 October 2004 | ITF Mackay, Australia | 25,000 | Hard | (Australia) Nicole Kriz | (Australia) Daniella Dominikovic (Australia) Evie Dominikovic | w/o |
| Runner-up | 4. | 28 May 2005 | ITF Phuket, Thailand | 25,000 | Hard | (Germany) Annette Kolb | (Uzbekistan) Akgul Amanmuradova (Thailand) Napaporn Tongsalee | 1–6, 1–6 |
| Runner-up | 5. | 25 September 2005 | ITF Mackay, Australia | 25,000 | Hard | (Australia) Olivia Lukaszewicz | (Australia) Casey Dellacqua (Australia) Daniella Dominikovic | 6–7^{(6)}, 6–7^{(2)} |
| Runner-up | 6. | 13 November 2005 | ITF Port Pirie, Australia | 25,000 | Hard | (Australia) Christina Horiatopoulos | (Germany) Gréta Arn (United States) Sunitha Rao | 4–6, 6–3, 2–6 |
| Winner | 4. | 17 March 2006 | ITF Canberra, Australia | 25,000 | Clay | (Australia) Christina Horiatopoulos | (New Zealand) Leanne Baker (Australia) Nicole Kriz | 7–6^{(4)}, 6–1 |
| Winner | 5. | 24 March 2006 | ITF Melbourne, Australia | 25,000 | Clay | (Argentina) Erica Krauth | (Chinese Taipei) Chan Yung-jan (Chinese Taipei) Chuang Chia-jung | 7–6^{(4)}, 1–6, 6–1 |
| Winner | 6. | 23 April 2006 | Dothan Pro Classic, United States | 75,000 | Clay | (Argentina) Soledad Esperón | (Romania) Edina Gallovits (Uzbekistan) Varvara Lepchenko | 6–4, 3–6, 4–6 |
| Winner | 7. | 13 May 2006 | ITF Monzón, Spain | 25,000 | Hard | (Germany) Annette Kolb | (Poland) Olga Brózda (Israel) Yevgenia Savransky | 7–5, 6–3 |
| Winner | 8. | 19 May 2006 | ITF Tenerife, Spain | 25,000 | Hard | (Germany) Annette Kolb | (Spain) Estrella Cabeza Candela (Venezuela) Laura Vallvaerdu-Zafra | 4–6, 6–4, 6–1 |
| Winner | 9. | 2 July 2006 | ITF Périgueux, France | 25,000 | Clay | (Canada) Marie-Ève Pelletier | (Russia) Nina Bratchikova (Russia) Lioudmila Skavronskaia | 6–3, 6–4 |
| Runner-up | 7. | 9 July 2006 | ITF Valladolid, Spain | 25,000 | Hard | (Argentina) Soledad Esperón | (Czech Republic) Veronika Chvojková (Ukraine) Yana Levchenko | 1–6, 6–7^{(11)} |
| Winner | 10. | 7 October 2006 | ITF San Luis Potosí, Mexico | 25,000 | Hard | (Canada) Marie-Ève Pelletier | (Argentina) María José Argeri (Brazil) Carla Tiene | 6–7^{(2)}, 6–4, 6–4 |
| Runner-up | 8. | 13 October 2006 | ITF Saltillo, Mexico | 25,000 | Hard | (Canada) Marie-Ève Pelletier | (Brazil) Larissa Carvalho (Brazil) Joana Cortez | 2–6, 5–7 |
| Winner | 11. | 13 May 2007 | ITF Indian Harbour Beach, US | 50,000 | Clay | (United States) Angela Haynes | (United States) Carly Gullickson (United States) Lindsay Lee-Waters | 6–1, 3–6, 6–4 |
| Winner | 12. | 19 May 2007 | ITF Palm Beach Gardens, US | 25,000 | Clay | (United States) Aleke Tsoubanos | (Uruguay) Estefanía Craciún (Argentina) Betina Jozami | 7–5, 2–6, 6–3 |
| Winner | 13. | 29 June 2007 | ITF Istanbul, Turkey | 25,000 | Hard | (Ukraine) Tetiana Luzhanska | (Slovakia) Stanislava Hrozenská (Russia) Maria Kondratieva | 6–4, 6–4 |
| Runner-up | 9. | 19 October 2007 | ITF Gympie, Australia | 25,000 | Hard | (United Kingdom) Jade Curtis | (United States) Courtney Nagle (United States) Robin Stephenson | 4–6, 1–6 |
| Runner-up | 10. | 7 February 2008 | ITF Mildura, Australia | 25,000 | Grass | (Australia) Christina Wheeler | (New Zealand) Marina Erakovic (Australia) Nicole Kriz | 4–6, 4–6 |
| Winner | 14. | 21 March 2008 | ITF Sorrento, Australia | 25,000 | Hard | (United Kingdom) Melanie South | (Chinese Taipei) Chang Kai-chen (Chinese Taipei) Hwang I-hsuan | 6–2, 6–4 |
| Runner-up | 11. | 9 August 2008 | ITF Monterrey, Mexico | 100,000 | Hard | (United Kingdom) Melanie South | (Croatia) Jelena Pandžić (Slovakia) Magdaléna Rybáriková | 6–4, 4–6, [8–10] |
| Winner | 15. | 6 February 2009 | Burnie International, Australia | 25,000 | Hard | (United States) Abigail Spears | (China) Xu Yifan (China) Zhou Yimiao | 6–2, 6–4 |
| Winner | 16. | 6 March 2009 | ITF Sydney, Australia | 25,000 | Hard | (South Africa) Lizaan du Plessis | (China) Han Xinyun (China) Ji Chunmei | 6–3, 7–5 |
| Winner | 17. | 11 April 2009 | ITF Jackson, US | 25,000 | Clay | (Australia) Arina Rodionova | (United States) Laura Granville (United States) Riza Zalameda | 6–3, 6–4 |
| Winner | 18. | 23 May 2009 | ITF Santos, Brazil | 25,000 | Clay | (Argentina) Florencia Molinero | (Bolivia) María Fernanda Álvarez Terán (Argentina) María Irigoyen | 1–6, 6–1, [10–7] |
| Runner-up | 12. | 31 May 2009 | ITF Carson, US | 50,000 | Hard | (Australia) Nicole Kriz | (United States) Laura Granville (United States) Riza Zalameda | 3–6, 4–6 |
| Winner | 19. | 24 July 2009 | ITF Kharkiv, Ukraine | 25,000 | Clay | (Australia) Nicole Kriz | (Ukraine) Khrystyna Antoniichuk (Ukraine) Irina Buryachok | 6–3, 7–6^{(4)} |
| Winner | 20. | 7 February 2010 | ITF Rancho Mirage, US | 25,000 | Hard | (United States) Abigail Spears | (Ukraine) Lyudmyla Kichenok (Ukraine) Nadiia Kichenok | 6–3, 6–4 |
| Runner-up | 13. | 3 October 2011 | ITF Esperance, Australıa | 25,000 | Hard | (Poland) Sandra Zaniewska | (Australia) Casey Dellacqua (Australia) Olivia Rogowska | 3–6, 2–6 |
| Runner-up | 14. | 24 October 2011 | ITF Port Pirie, Australıa | 25,000 | Hard | (Australia) Bojana Bobusic | (Australia) Isabella Holland (Australia) Sally Peers | w/o |
| Runner-up | 15. | 14 November 2011 | ITF Traralgon, Australıa | 25,000 | Hard | (Australia) Bojana Bobusic | (Australia) Stephanie Bengson (Australia) Tyra Calderwood | 7–6^{(7)}, 1–6, 3–6 |
| Winner | 21. | 19 March 2012 | ITF Ipswich, Australıa | 25,000 | Hard | (Poland) Sandra Zaniewska | (Japan) Shuko Aoyama (Japan) Junri Namigata | 7–5, 6–4 |
| Winner | 22. | 7 May 2012 | Fukuoka International, Japan | 50,000 | Grass | (Australia) Stephanie Bengson | (Japan) Misa Eguchi (Japan) Akiko Omae | 6–4, 6–4 |
| Winner | 23. | 16 July 2012 | ITF Campos do Jordão, Brazil | 25,000 | Hard | (Brazil) Maria Fernanda Alves | (Brazil) Paula Cristina Gonçalves (Brazil) Roxane Vaisemberg | 4–6, 6–3, [10–3] |
| Winner | 24. | 27 August 2012 | ITF Cairns, Australıa | 25,000 | Hard | (France) Victoria Larrière | (Australia) Tyra Calderwood (Australia) Tammi Patterson | 6–2, 1–6, [10–5] |
| Runner-up | 16. | 15 October 2012 | ITF Makinohara, Japan | 25,000 | Grass | (France) Caroline Garcia | (Japan) Eri Hozumi (Japan) Miyu Kato | 6–7^{(6)}, 3–6 |
| Runner-up | 17. | 22 October 2012 | ITF Hamamatsu, Japan | 25,000 | Grass | (United States) Alexa Glatch | (Japan) Shuko Aoyama (Japan) Miki Miyamura | 6–3, 4–6, [6–10] |
| Winner | 25. | 3 June 2013 | ITF Brescia, Italy | 25,000 | Clay | (Japan) Yurika Sema | (Hungary) Réka Luca Jani (Russia) Irina Khromacheva | 6–4, 7–5 |
| Runner-up | 18. | 17 June 2013 | ITF Ystad, Sweden | 25,000 | Clay | (Turkey) Pemra Özgen | (Germany) Kristina Barrois (Lithuania) Lina Stančiūtė | 4–6, 5–7 |
| Winner | 26. | 5 August 2013 | ITF Landisville, US | 25,000 | Hard | (Australia) Olivia Rogowska | (South Africa) Chanel Simmonds (United Kingdom) Emily Webley-Smith | 6–2, 6–3 |
| Runner-up | 19. | 5 October 2013 | ITF Perth, Australıa | 25,000 | Hard | (Australia) Tammi Patterson | (Japan) Erika Sema (Japan) Yurika Sema | 5–7, 1–6 |
| Runner-up | 20. | 13 October 2013 | ITF Margaret River, Australıa | 25,000 | Hard | (Australia) Tammi Patterson | (Thailand) Noppawan Lertcheewakarn (Russia) Arina Rodionova | 2–6, 6–3, [8–10] |
| Runner-up | 21. | 27 October 2013 | Bendigo International, Australıa | 50,000 | Hard | (Australia) Olivia Rogowska | (Japan) Erika Sema (Japan) Yurika Sema | 6–3, 2–6, [9–11] |
| Winner | 27. | 1 November 2013 | Bendigo International, Australıa | 50,000 | Hard | (Australia) Olivia Rogowska | (Australia) Stephanie Bengson (Australia) Sally Peers | 6–3, 2–6, [11–9] |
| Winner | 28. | 9 February 2014 | Launceston International, Australıa | 50,000 | Hard | (Australia) Olivia Rogowska | (Thailand) Kamonwan Buayam (Slovakia) Zuzana Zlochová | 6–2, 6–4 |
| Runner-up | 22. | 31 March 2014 | Open Medellín, Colombia | 50,000 | Clay | (Russia) Marina Shamayko | (Romania) Irina-Camelia Begu (Argentina) María Irigoyen | 2–6, 6–7 |
| Winner | 29. | Sep 2016 | ITF Tweed Heads, Australia | 25,000 | Hard | (Australia) Olivia Rogowska | (Australia) Naiktha Bains (Australia) Abbie Myers | 7–6^{(6)}, 7–6^{(3)} |
| Winner | 30. | Feb 2017 | Launceston International, Australia | 60,000 | Hard | (United States) Nicole Melichar | (Italy) Georgia Brescia (Slovenia) Tamara Zidanšek | 6–1, 6–2 |
| Winner | 31. | Jun 2017 | Surbiton Trophy, UK | 100,000 | Grass | (Australia) Storm Sanders | (Chinese Taipei) Chang Kai-chen (New Zealand) Marina Erakovic | 7–5, 6–4 |
| Winner | 32. | Dec 2022 | ITF Wellington, New Zealand | 15,000 | Hard | (Australia) Sophie McDonald | (Australia) Mia Repac (Australia) Alicia Smith | 4–6, 6–1, [10–6] |
