= Lioudmila Skavronskaia =

Russian tennis player

Lioudmila Skavronskaia Людмила Скавронская
- Country (sports): Russia
- Born: 23 March 1980 (age 45); Soviet Union
- Turned pro: 1995
- Retired: 2010
- Plays: Right-handed (one-handed backhand)
- Prize money: $204,496

Singles
- Career record: 198–177
- Career titles: 4 ITF
- Highest ranking: No. 124 (19 July 2004)

Grand Slam singles results
- Australian Open: Q2 (2004, 2007)
- French Open: Q3 (2006)
- Wimbledon: Q2 (2007)
- US Open: 1R (2006)

Doubles
- Career record: 57–70
- Career titles: 1 ITF
- Highest ranking: No. 270 (19 November 2001)

Lioudmila Skavronskaia (Russian: Людмила Скавронская; born 23 March 1980) is a Russian former professional tennis player.

She has a career-high WTA singles ranking of 124, achieved on 19 July 2004. She also has a career-high doubles ranking of world No. 270, reached on 19 November 2014. She won four singles titles and one doubles title in tournaments of the ITF Women's Circuit.

Skavronskaia retired from tennis in 2010.

== ITF Circuit finals ==
=== Singles (4–3) ===
Legend $75,000 tournaments $50,000 tournaments $25,000 tournaments $10,000 tournaments	Finals by surface Hard (3–2) Clay (1–1)

Result	Date	Tier	Tournament	Surface	Opponent	Score
Loss	28 October 1996	10,000	ITF Minsk, Belarus	Hard (i)	(Belarus) Nadejda Ostrovskaya	2–6, 4–6
Win	29 May 2000	10,000	ITF San Antonio, United States	Hard	(United Kingdom) Joanne Moore	6–2, 4–6, 6–4
Loss	8 July 2003	25,000	ITF College Park, United States	Hard	(Puerto Rico) Kristina Brandi	1–6, 1–6
Win	22 June 2004	25,000	ITF Fontanafredda, Italy	Clay	(Spain) Conchita Martínez Granados	6–1, 6–3
Win	4 July 2004	50,000	ITF Los Gatos, United States	Hard	(Canada) Maureen Drake	7–6^{(0)}, 6–4
Win	6 September 2005	75,000	ITF Denain, France	Hard	(Spain) Arantxa Parra Santonja	7–6^{(5)}, 6–0
Loss	13 September 2005	50,000	ITF Bordeaux, France	Clay	(France) Stéphanie Foretz	1–6, 2–6

=== Doubles (1–4) ===
Legend $25,000 tournaments $10,000 tournaments	Finals by surface Hard (0–3) Clay (1–1)

Result	Date	Tier	Tournament	Surface	Partner	Opponents	Score
Win	16 June 1997	10,000	ITF Caserta, Italy	Clay	(Israel) Limor Gabai	(Colombia) Carmiña Giraldo (Argentina) Paula Racedo	6–3, 6–3
Loss	22 January 2001	10,000	ITF Miami, United States	Hard	(United States) Jane Chi	(Russia) Evgenia Kulikovskaya (United States) Jolene Watanabe	2–6, 4–6
Loss	11 June 2001	25,000	ITF Mount Pleasant, United States	Hard	(United States) Jane Chi	(South Korea) Choi Young-ja (South Korea) Jeon Mi-ra	7–6^{(2)}, 2–6, 2–6
Loss	14 January 2003	10,000	ITF Boca Raton, United States	Hard	(United States) Shenay Perry	(United States) Sandra Cacic (Canada) Sonya Jeyaseelan	5–7, 2–6
Loss	2 July 2006	25,000	ITF Périgueux, France	Clay	(Russia) Nina Bratchikova	(Australia) Monique Adamczak (Canada) Marie-Ève Pelletier	3–6, 4–6
