= Ivana Lisjak =

Croatian tennis player

- Country (sports): Croatia
- Residence: Los Angeles, California, U.S.
- Born: 17 March 1987 (age 38) Čakovec, SR Croatia, SFR Yugoslavia
- Height: 1.80 m (5 ft 11 in)
- Turned pro: 2002
- Retired: 2013
- Plays: Right-handed (two-handed backhand)
- Prize money: $285,501

Singles
- Career record: 218–148
- Career titles: 7 ITF
- Highest ranking: No. 95 (5 June 2006)

Grand Slam singles results
- Australian Open: Q3 (2007)
- French Open: 3R (2006)
- Wimbledon: 1R (2006)
- US Open: 3R (2005)

Doubles
- Career record: 49–39
- Career titles: 1 ITF
- Highest ranking: No. 209 (3 March 2008)

Grand Slam doubles results
- US Open: 1R (2006)

Ivana Lisjak (Croatian pronunciation: [ǐʋana lǐsjaːk]; born March 17, 1987) is a former tennis player from Croatia. She turned professional at the age of 14, peaked at No. 95 on the WTA rankings, and retired in 2013 due to chronic injuries.

In Croatia, Lisjak was No. 1 in the girls' under-10, 12, 14, and 16 as well as ranked No. 1 in Europe under-12 and 14.

== Post-tennis career ==
While a professional tennis player, Lisjak received a bachelor's degree in sports management and a bachelor's degree in business and economics.

== ITF Circuit finals ==
$100,000 tournaments
$75,000 tournaments
$50,000 tournaments
$25,000 tournaments
$10,000 tournaments

=== Singles: 15 (7 titles, 8 runner-ups) ===
Result	No.	Date	Tournament	Surface	Opponent	Score
Loss	1.	Oct 2002	ITF Makarska, Croatia	Clay	(Slovenia) Tina Hergold	4–6, 2–6
Win	2.	Oct 2002	ITF Makarska, Croatia	Clay	(Slovenia) Tina Hergold	7–6^{(5)}, 5–7, 6–3
Loss	3.	Apr 2003	ITF Maglie, Italy	Clay	(Czech Republic) Lenka Němečková	7–5, 1–6, 6–7
Loss	4.	Mar 2005	ITF Redding, United States	Hard	(Czech Republic) Lucie Šafářová	2–6, 3–6
Loss	5.	Apr 2005	ITF Bol, Croatia	Clay	(Croatia) Sanja Ančić	5–7, 4–6
Win	6.	May 2005	ITF Caserta, Italy	Clay	(Czech Republic) Olga Blahotová	6–3, 7–5
Win	7.	Jun 2005	ITF Gorizia, Italy	Clay	(Italy) Alice Canepa	6–2, 6–3
Loss	8.	Nov 2006	ITF Poitiers, France	Hard	(France) Aravane Rezaï	6–7, 1–6
Loss	9.	Jun 2007	ITF Zagreb, Croatia	Clay	(Hungary) Kyra Nagy	6–2, 6–7, 2–6
Loss	10.	Dec 2007	ITF Valašské Meziříčí, Czech Republic	Hard (i)	(Czech Republic) Petra Kvitová	4–6, 0–6
Win	11.	Jun 2009	ITF Sarajevo, Bosnia and Herzegovina	Clay	(Serbia) Ana Jovanović	6–0, 7–6^{(10)}
Win	12.	Aug 2009	ITF Monteroni, Italy	Clay	(Italy) Claudia Giovine	6–4, 6–2
Win	13.	Oct 2010	ITF Clermont-Ferrand, France	Hard (i)	(France) Iryna Brémond	6–4, 6–1
Win	14.	Oct 2010	ITF Limoges, France	Hard (i)	(Ukraine) Yuliya Beygelzimer	6–0, 6–3
Loss	15.	Jul 2013	ITF Yakima, United States	Hard	(United States) Nicole Gibbs	1–6, 4–6

=== Doubles: 7 (1 title, 6 runner-ups) ===
Result	No.	Date	Tournament	Surface	Partner	Opponents	Score
Loss	1.	Apr 2005	ITF Bol, Croatia	Clay	(Croatia) Sanja Ančić	(Sweden) Mari Andersson (Sweden) Kristina Andlovic	3–6, 2–6
Win	2.	May 2005	ITF Cavtat, Croatia	Clay	(Germany) Korina Perkovic	(Slovenia) Meta Sevšek (Slovenia) Ana Skafar	6–4, 7–6^{(2)}
Loss	3.	May 2005	ITF Caserta, Italy	Clay	(Croatia) Nadja Pavić	(Czech Republic) Olga Vymetálková (Argentina) Soledad Esperón	5–7, 5–7
Loss	4.	Dec 2007	ITF Valašské Meziříčí, Czech Republic	Hard (i)	(Croatia) Darija Jurak	(Czech Republic) Andrea Hlaváčková (Czech Republic) Lucie Hradecká	2–6, 1–6
Loss	5.	Feb 2008	ITF Stockholm, Sweden	Hard (i)	(Serbia) Neda Kozić	(Sweden) Johanna Larsson (United Kingdom) Anna Smith	0–6, 5–7
Loss	6.	Feb 2008	ITF Capriolo, Italy	Carpet (i)	(Croatia) Darija Jurak	(South Africa) Kelly Anderson (United Kingdom) Sarah Borwell	6–7^{(7)}, 4–6
Loss	7.	Mar 2011	ITF Monzón, Spain	Hard	(Georgia (country)) Margalita Chakhnashvili	(Russia) Elena Bovina (Russia) Valeria Savinykh	1–6, 6–2, 4–6
