= 2004 Australian Open – Girls' doubles =

Girls' doubles
- 2004 Australian Open

Final
- Champion: (Chinese Taipei) Chan Yung-jan (China) Sun Shengnan
- Runner-up: (Czech Republic) Veronika Chvojková (Czech Republic) Nicole Vaidišová
- Score: 7–5, 6–3

Events
Singles	men	women		boys	girls
Doubles	men	women	mixed	boys	girls
WC Singles	men	women	quad
WC Doubles	men	women	quad
Legends	men	women	mixed
- Australian Open

Casey Dellacqua and Adriana Szili were the defending champions, but did not compete in the Juniors that year.

Chan Yung-jan and Sun Shengnan won the title, defeating Veronika Chvojková and Nicole Vaidišová in the final, 7–5, 6–3.

== Seeds ==
1. (Czech Republic) Veronika Chvojková / (Czech Republic) Nicole Vaidišová (final)
2. (Chinese Taipei) Yung-Jan Chan / (China) Sheng-Nan Sun (champions)
3. (New Zealand) Marina Erakovic / (Russia) Ekaterina Kosminskaya (semifinals)
4. (Slovakia) Jarmila Gajdošová / (Israel) Shahar Pe'er (semifinals)
5. (Serbia and Montenegro) Ana Ivanovic / (Russia) Alla Kudryavtseva (second round)
6. (Croatia) Sanja Ančić / (Egypt) Haidy El Tabakh (quarterfinals)
7. (Canada) Stéphanie Dubois / (Canada) Katarina Zoricic (second round)
8. (Italy) Verdiana Verardi / (Slovenia) Maša Zec Peškirič (first round)

== Draw ==
Key

- Q = Qualifier
- WC = Wild card
- LL = Lucky loser
- Alt = Alternate
- ITF = ITF entry
- PR = Protected ranking
- SR = Special ranking
- SE = Special exempt
- JE = Junior exempt
- JR = Junior Accelerator Programme entrant
- CO = College Accelerator Programme entrant
- NG = Next Gen Accelerator Program entrant
- w/o = Walkover
- r = Retired
- d = Defaulted

=== Finals ===
Semifinals
1	(Czech Republic) Veronika Chvojková (Czech Republic) Nicole Vaidišová	6	6
4	(Slovakia) Jarmila Gajdošová (Israel) Shahar Pe'er	2	4
3	(New Zealand) Marina Erakovic (Russia) Ekaterina Kosminskaya	6^{2}	2
2	(Chinese Taipei) Yung-Jan Chan (China) Sheng-Nan Sun	7^{7}	6

Final
1	(Czech Republic) Veronika Chvojková (Czech Republic) Nicole Vaidišová	5	3
2	(Chinese Taipei) Yung-Jan Chan (China) Sheng-Nan Sun	7	6

=== Top half ===
First round
1	(Czech Republic) Veronika Chvojková (Czech Republic) Nicole Vaidišová	6	4	6
(Germany) Angelique Kerber (Poland) Marta Leśniak	3	6	1
(Switzerland) Timea Bacsinszky (Poland) Magdalena Kiszczyńska	6	6
(United States) Lindsay Burdette (United States) Yvette Hyndman	2	2
(Australia) Daniella Dominikovic (Australia) Sophie Ferguson	7	1	5
(Sweden) Mari Andersson (South Korea) So-Jung Kim	5	6	7
(China) Wan-Ting Liu (China) Shuai Zhang	2	1
5	(Serbia and Montenegro) Ana Ivanovic (Russia) Alla Kudryavtseva	6	6
4	(Slovakia) Jarmila Gajdošová (Israel) Shahar Pe'er	6	6
(United States) Jennifer Elie (Sweden) Michaela Johansson	3	0
WC	(Australia) Natalie Solevski (Australia) Lia Tapper	0	0
(Australia) Lara Giltinan (Chinese Taipei) Wen-Hsin Hsu	6	6
(Australia) Jessica Engels (Australia) Julianne Welford	6	3	1
(United States) Michelle Mitchell (United States) Katrina Tsang	2	6	6
WC	(Australia) Michelle Brycki (Australia) Shayna McDowell	3	6	3
7	(Canada) Stéphanie Dubois (Canada) Katarina Zoricic	6	1	6

Second round
1	(Czech Republic) V Chvojková (Czech Republic) N Vaidišová	6	6
(Switzerland) T Bacsinszky (Poland) M Kiszczyńska	2	1
(Sweden) M Andersson (South Korea) S-J Kim	2	7^{7}	7^{8}
5	(Serbia and Montenegro) A Ivanovic (Russia) A Kudryavtseva	6	6^{3}	6^{6}
4	(Slovakia) J Gajdošová (Israel) S Pe'er	6	6
(Australia) L Giltinan (Chinese Taipei) W-H Hsu	0	2
(United States) M Mitchell (United States) K Tsang	7	5	7^{9}
7	(Canada) S Dubois (Canada) K Zoricic	5	7	6^{7}

Quarterfinals
1	(Czech Republic) V Chvojková (Czech Republic) N Vaidišová	6	6
(Sweden) M Andersson (South Korea) S-J Kim	1	0
4	(Slovakia) J Gajdošová (Israel) S Pe'er	6	6
(United States) M Mitchell (United States) K Tsang	4	2

Semifinals
1	(Czech Republic) V Chvojková (Czech Republic) N Vaidišová	6	6
4	(Slovakia) J Gajdošová (Israel) S Pe'er	2	4

=== Bottom half ===
First round
8	(Italy) Verdiana Verardi (Slovenia) Maša Zec Peškirič	2	3
(United States) Vania King (United States) Yasmin Schnack	6	6
(Australia) Jessica Hoath (Germany) Sarah Raab	w/o
(United States) Mary Gambale (New Zealand) Shona Lee
(Canada) Eunice David (Canada) Mélanie Gloria	6	6
(Australia) Bojana Bobusic (Australia) Dubravka Cupac	2	4
(India) Sanaa Bhambri (Indonesia) Ayu Fani Damayanti	2	0
3	(New Zealand) Marina Erakovic (Russia) Ekaterina Kosminskaya	6	6
6	(Croatia) Sanja Ančić (Egypt) Haidy El Tabakh	6	6
(Australia) Lara Picone (Australia) Natalie Tanevska	3	4
WC	(Australia) Dragana Jakovljevic (Russia) Anastasia Sourkova	7	6
WC	(Australia) Tyra Calderwood (Australia) Marija Mirkovic	5	4
(China) Yan-Chong Chen (China) Rui Du	6	6
(Serbia and Montenegro) Vojislava Lukić (Japan) Yurika Sema	2	3
(Germany) Nina Henkel (Austria) Stefanie Rath	2	0
2	(Chinese Taipei) Yung-Jan Chan (China) Sheng-Nan Sun	6	6

Second round
(United States) V King (United States) Y Schnack	6	6
(Australia) J Hoath (Germany) S Raab	1	0
(Canada) E David (Canada) M Gloria	2	3
3	(New Zealand) M Erakovic (Russia) E Kosminskaya	6	6
6	(Croatia) S Ančić (Egypt) H El Tabakh	2	6	6
WC	(Australia) D Jakovljevic (Russia) A Sourkova	6	3	3
(China) Y-C Chen (China) R Du	5	2
2	(Chinese Taipei) Y-J Chan (China) S-N Sun	7	6

Quarterfinals
(United States) V King (United States) Y Schnack	6	2	3
3	(New Zealand) M Erakovic (Russia) E Kosminskaya	3	6	6
6	(Croatia) S Ančić (Egypt) H El Tabakh	3	2
2	(Chinese Taipei) Y-J Chan (China) S-N Sun	6	6

Semifinals
3	(New Zealand) M Erakovic (Russia) E Kosminskaya	6^{2}	2
2	(Chinese Taipei) Y-J Chan (China) S-N Sun	7^{7}	6
