= 2004 Australian Open =

- Date: 19 January – 1 February 2004
- Edition: 92nd
- Category: Grand Slam (ITF)
- Surface: Hardcourt (Rebound Ace)
- Location: Melbourne, Australia
- Venue: Melbourne Park

Champions

Men's singles
- (Switzerland) Roger Federer

Women's singles
- (Belgium) Justine Henin-Hardenne

Men's doubles
- (France) Michaël Llodra / (France) Fabrice Santoro

Women's doubles
- (Spain) Virginia Ruano Pascual / (Argentina) Paola Suárez

Mixed doubles
- (Russia) Elena Bovina / (Serbia and Montenegro) Nenad Zimonjić

Wheelchair men's singles
- (Australia) David Hall

Wheelchair women's singles
- (Netherlands) Esther Vergeer

Wheelchair men's doubles
- (Netherlands) Robin Ammerlaan / (Austria) Martin Legner

Wheelchair women's doubles
- (Netherlands) Maaike Smit / (Netherlands) Esther Vergeer

Boys' singles
- (France) Gaël Monfils

Girls' singles
- (Israel) Shahar Pe'er

Boys' doubles
- (United States) Scott Oudsema / (United States) Brendan Evans

Girls' doubles
- (Chinese Taipei) Chan Yung-jan / (China) Sun Sheng-Nan
- Australian Open

The 2004 Australian Open was a Grand Slam tennis tournament held in Melbourne, Australia from 19 January to 1 February 2004.

Andre Agassi was unsuccessful in defending his 2003 title, being defeated in the semi-finals by Marat Safin. This ended a 26-match winning streak for Agassi at the Australian Open, having previously won in 2000, 2001 and 2003, missing 2002 through injury. Roger Federer won his first Australian Open title, defeating Safin in the final. Serena Williams was unable to defend her 2003 title after withdrawing from the tournament due to a left knee injury. Justine Henin-Hardenne defeated compatriot and rival Kim Clijsters in the final to win her only Australian Open title.

== Seniors ==
=== Men's singles ===
(Switzerland) Roger Federer defeated (Russia) Marat Safin, 7–6^{(7–3)}, 6–4, 6–2

- It was Federer's 1st title of the year, and his 12th overall. It was his 2nd career Grand Slam title, and his 1st Australian Open title.

=== Women's singles ===
(Belgium) Justine Henin-Hardenne defeated (Belgium) Kim Clijsters, 6–3, 4–6, 6–3

- It was Henin-Hardenne's 2nd title of the year, and her 16th overall. It was her 3rd career Grand Slam title, and her 1st Australian Open title.

=== Men's doubles ===
(France) Michaël Llodra / (France) Fabrice Santoro defeated (United States) Bob Bryan / (United States) Mike Bryan, 7–6^{(7–4)}, 6–3

- It was Llodra's 2nd career Grand Slam doubles title and his 2nd (consecutive) at the Australian Open.
- It was Santoro's 2nd career Grand Slam doubles title and his 2nd (consecutive) at the Australian Open.

=== Women's doubles ===
(Spain) Virginia Ruano / (Argentina) Paola Suárez defeated (Russia) Svetlana Kuznetsova / (Russia) Elena Likhovtseva, 6–4, 6–3

=== Mixed doubles ===
(Russia) Elena Bovina / (Serbia and Montenegro) Nenad Zimonjić defeated (United States) Martina Navratilova / (India) Leander Paes, 6–1, 7–6^{(7–3)}

- It was Bovina's 1st career Grand Slam mixed doubles title.
- It was Zimonjić's 1st career Grand Slam mixed doubles title.

== Juniors ==
=== Boys' singles ===
(France) Gaël Monfils defeated (France) Josselin Ouanna, 6–0, 6–3

=== Girls' singles ===
(Israel) Shahar Pe'er defeated (Czech Republic) Nicole Vaidišová, 6–1, 6–4

=== Boys' doubles ===
(United States) Scott Oudsema / (United States) Brendan Evans defeated (Australia) David Galić / (Australia) David Jeflea, 6–1, 6–1

=== Girls' doubles ===
(Chinese Taipei) Chan Yung-jan / (China) Sun Shengnan defeated (Czech Republic) Veronika Chvojková / (Czech Republic) Nicole Vaidišová, 7–5, 6–3

== Wheelchair ==
=== Men's singles ===
(Australia) David Hall defeated (Netherlands) Robin Ammerlaan, 6–4, 7–5

=== Women's singles ===
(Netherlands) Esther Vergeer defeated (Australia) Daniela Di Toro, 4–6, 6–3, 6–1

=== Men's doubles ===
(Netherlands) Robin Ammerlaan / (Austria) Martin Legner defeated (Poland) Tadeusz Kruszelnicki / (Japan) Satoshi Saida, 6–3, 6–3

=== Women's doubles ===
(Netherlands) Maaike Smit / (Netherlands) Esther Vergeer defeated (Netherlands) Sonja Peters / (Netherlands) Sharon Walraven, 6–3, 7–6(3)

== Notes ==
Preceded by 2003 US Open	Grand Slams	Succeeded by 2004 French Open
