= Sanja Ančić =

Croatian tennis player (born 1988)

- Country (sports): Croatia
- Born: 18 July 1988 (age 36); Split, SR Croatia, SFR Yugoslavia
- Height: 1.78 m (5 ft 10 in)
- Retired: 2007
- Plays: Right-handed (two-handed backhand)
- Prize money: $64,537

Singles
- Career record: 90–40
- Career titles: 8 ITF
- Highest ranking: No. 159 (11 September 2006)

Grand Slam singles results
- Australian Open: Q1 (2007)
- French Open: Q1 (2007)
- Wimbledon Junior: 1R (2004)
- US Open Junior: 3R (2003)

Doubles
- Career record: 19–19
- Career titles: 1 ITF
- Highest ranking: No. 240 (5 March 2007)

Grand Slam doubles results
- Australian Open Junior: QF (2004)
- French Open Junior: 1R (2003) (2004)
- Wimbledon Junior: 1R (2004)
- US Open Junior: 1R (2004)

Team competitions
- Fed Cup: 1-2

Sanja Ančić (Croatian pronunciation: [sâɲa âːntʃitɕ]; born 18 July 1988) is a former tennis player from Croatia. She won a total of eight ITF tournaments in singles and one title in doubles. Her highest singles ranking was world No. 159, which she reached on 11 September 2006, and her best doubles ranking 240, reached in March 2007. She retired in 2007.

== Biography ==
Ančić was born in Split to Stipe and Nilda Ančić. She plays right-handed, has a two-handed backhand and is the sister of professional tennis players Ivica and Mario Ančić. She played with her brother in the 2007 Hopman Cup.

== ITF finals ==
=== Singles: 9 (8–1) ===
Legend
$100,000 tournaments
$75,000 tournaments
$50,000 tournaments
$25,000 tournaments
$10,000 tournaments

Finals by surface
Hard (0–0)
Clay (8–1)
Grass (0–0)
Carpet (0–0)

Outcome	No.	Date	Tournament	Surface	Opponent	Score
Winner	1.	25 July 2004	ITF Ancona, Italy	Clay	(Russia) Ekaterina Lopes	6–2, 6–1
Winner	2.	10 October 2004	Dubrovnik, Croatia	Clay	(Slovakia) Lenka Dlhopolcová	6–4, 6–2
Runner-up	3.	17 October 2004	Dubrovnik, Croatia	Clay	(Hungary) Barbara Pócza	4–6, 0–6
Winner	4.	10 April 2005	Makarska, Croatia	Clay	(France) Émilie Bacquet	6–4, 6–3
Winner	5.	17 April 2005	Hvar, Croatia	Clay	(Slovenia) Maša Zec Peškirič	6–3, 6–1
Winner	6.	24 April 2005	Bol, Croatia	Clay	(Croatia) Ivana Lisjak	6–3, 6–1
Winner	7.	11 June 2006	Grado, Italy	Clay	(Croatia) Ana Vrljić	6–4, 3–6, 6–4
Winner	8.	20 August 2006	Rimini, Italy	Clay	(Slovakia) Dominika Cibulková	7–6, 3–6, 6–3
Winner	9.	10 September 2006	ITF Mestre, Italy	Clay	(Germany) Sandra Klösel	6–1, 6–2

=== Doubles: 2 (1-1) ===
Outcome	No.	Date	Tournament	Surface	Partner	Opponents	Score
Runner-up	1.	24 April 2005	ITF Bol, Croatia	Clay	(Croatia) Ivana Lisjak	(Sweden) Mari Andersson (Sweden) Kristina Andlovic	3–6, 2–6
Winner	2.	18 September 2005	ITF Sofia, Bulgaria	Clay	(Austria) Tamira Paszek	(Brazil) Joana Cortez (Poland) Karolina Kosińska	6–7, 6–2, 6–4
