= 2004 Australian Open – Men's doubles =

Men's doubles
- 2004 Australian Open

Final
- Champion: (France) Michaël Llodra (France) Fabrice Santoro
- Runner-up: (United States) Bob Bryan (United States) Mike Bryan
- Score: 7–6^{(7–4)}, 6–3

Details
- Draw: 64
- Seeds: 16

Events
Singles	men	women		boys	girls
Doubles	men	women	mixed	boys	girls
WC Singles	men	women	quad
WC Doubles	men	women	quad
Legends	men	women	mixed
- Australian Open

Michaël Llodra and Fabrice Santoro were the defending champions, and won the final 7–6^{(7–4)}, 6–3 against Bob and Mike Bryan.

== Seeds ==
1. (United States) Bob Bryan / (United States) Mike Bryan (final)
2. (India) Mahesh Bhupathi / (Belarus) Max Mirnyi (quarterfinals)
3. (Sweden) Jonas Björkman / (Australia) Todd Woodbridge (semifinals)
4. (The Bahamas) Mark Knowles / (Canada) Daniel Nestor (quarterfinals)
5. (France) Michaël Llodra / (France) Fabrice Santoro (champions)
6. (Australia) Wayne Arthurs / (Australia) Paul Hanley (second round)
7. (Czech Republic) Martin Damm / (Czech Republic) Cyril Suk (second round)
8. (Zimbabwe) Wayne Black / (Zimbabwe) Kevin Ullyett (quarterfinals)
9. (Argentina) Gastón Etlis / (Argentina) Martín Rodríguez (semifinals)
10. (Czech Republic) Tomáš Cibulec / (India) Leander Paes (first round)
11. (Argentina) Lucas Arnold Ker / (Argentina) Mariano Hood (first round)
12. (United States) Jared Palmer / (Czech Republic) Pavel Vízner (first round)
13. (Czech Republic) František Čermák / (Czech Republic) Leoš Friedl (third round)
14. (Israel) Jonathan Erlich / (Israel) Andy Ram (second round)
15. (South Africa) Robbie Koenig / (Czech Republic) Petr Pála (third round)
16. (Sweden) Simon Aspelin / (Italy) Massimo Bertolini (second round)

== Draw ==
Key

- Q = Qualifier
- WC = Wild card
- LL = Lucky loser
- Alt = Alternate
- ITF = ITF entry
- PR = Protected ranking
- SR = Special ranking
- SE = Special exempt
- JE = Junior exempt
- JR = Junior Accelerator Programme entrant
- CO = College Accelerator Programme entrant
- NG = Next Gen Accelerator Program entrant
- w/o = Walkover
- r = Retired
- d = Defaulted

=== Finals ===
Quarterfinals
1	(United States) Bob Bryan (United States) Mike Bryan	6	6
(Brazil) André Sá (Brazil) Flávio Saretta	2	1
3	(Sweden) Jonas Björkman (Australia) Todd Woodbridge	6	6
8	(Zimbabwe) Wayne Black (Zimbabwe) Kevin Ullyett	0	2
9	(Argentina) Gastón Etlis (Argentina) Martín Rodríguez	7	6^{6}	6
4	(The Bahamas) Mark Knowles (Canada) Daniel Nestor	6^{3}	7	3
5	(France) Michaël Llodra (France) Fabrice Santoro	6	6
2	(India) Mahesh Bhupathi (Belarus) Max Mirnyi	3	4

Semifinals
1	(United States) Bob Bryan (United States) Mike Bryan	6	6
3	(Sweden) Jonas Björkman (Australia) Todd Woodbridge	1	2
9	(Argentina) Gastón Etlis (Argentina) Martín Rodríguez	2	5
5	(France) Michaël Llodra (France) Fabrice Santoro	6	7

Final
1	(United States) Bob Bryan (United States) Mike Bryan	6^{4}	3
5	(France) Michaël Llodra (France) Fabrice Santoro	7	6

=== Top half ===
==== Section 1 ====
First round
1	(United States) B Bryan (United States) M Bryan	6	7
(Chile) F González (Chile) N Massú	4	6^{4}
(Argentina) M García (Argentina) S Prieto	6	6
(Australia) T Perry (Japan) T Shimada	4	4
(Belgium) X Malisse (Belgium) O Rochus	6^{7}	6	6
(Germany) L Burgsmüller (Peru) L Horna	7	4	3
(Ecuador) N Lapentti (United States) J Thomas	5	3
15	(South Africa) R Koenig (Czech Republic) P Pála	7	6
12	(United States) J Palmer (Czech Republic) P Vízner	5	3
(Austria) J Melzer (Serbia and Montenegro) N Zimonjić	7	6
(Switzerland) Y Allegro (Switzerland) R Federer	4	4
(Brazil) A Sá (Brazil) F Saretta	6	6
(Czech Republic) J Novák (Czech Republic) R Štěpánek	6	1	6
(United States) R Kendrick (United States) V Spadea	2	6	2
(Romania) A Pavel (Belgium) T Vanhoudt	6	3	5
7	(Czech Republic) M Damm (Czech Republic) C Suk	4	6	7

Second round
1	(United States) B Bryan (United States) M Bryan	6^{7}	7	6
(Argentina) M García (Argentina) S Prieto	7	6^{3}	0
(Belgium) X Malisse (Belgium) O Rochus
15	(South Africa) R Koenig (Czech Republic) P Pála	w/o
(Austria) J Melzer (Serbia and Montenegro) N Zimonjić	4	4
(Brazil) A Sá (Brazil) F Saretta	6	6
(Czech Republic) J Novák (Czech Republic) R Štěpánek	7	6
7	(Czech Republic) M Damm (Czech Republic) C Suk	5	2

Third round
1	(United States) B Bryan (United States) M Bryan	6	4	7
15	(South Africa) R Koenig (Czech Republic) P Pála	2	6	6^{4}
(Brazil) A Sá (Brazil) F Saretta	4	7	6
(Czech Republic) J Novák (Czech Republic) R Štěpánek	6	5	4

Quarterfinals
1	(United States) B Bryan (United States) M Bryan	6	6
(Brazil) A Sá (Brazil) F Saretta	2	1

==== Section 2 ====
First round
3	(Sweden) J Björkman (Australia) T Woodbridge	6	6
(United States) S Humphries (The Bahamas) M Merklein	4	2
(Slovakia) K Kučera (Czech Republic) B Ulihrach	4	2
(Czech Republic) P Luxa (Czech Republic) D Škoch	6	6
(Croatia) M Ančić (Spain) F López	7	6
WC	(Australia) A Kennedy (Australia) T Reid	6^{1}	3
(Romania) V Hănescu (Italy) D Sanguinetti	7	4	6^{4}
13	(Czech Republic) F Čermák (Czech Republic) L Friedl	5	6	7
11	(Argentina) L Arnold Ker (Argentina) M Hood	4	6	1
(Spain) R Nadal (Spain) T Robredo	6	4	6
(South Africa) J Coetzee (South Africa) C Haggard	6	7
WC	(Australia) J Eagle (Australia) P Rafter	2	5
(Spain) A Martín (Spain) A Portas	3	3
(Spain) G Blanco (Spain) A Costa	6	0	r
(Spain) R Ramírez Hidalgo (Spain) D Sánchez	0	2
8	(Zimbabwe) W Black (Zimbabwe) K Ullyett	6	6

Second round
3	(Sweden) J Björkman (Australia) T Woodbridge	6	2
(Czech Republic) P Luxa (Czech Republic) D Škoch	3	1	r
(Croatia) M Ančić (Spain) F López	4	4
13	(Czech Republic) F Čermák (Czech Republic) L Friedl	6	6
(Spain) R Nadal (Spain) T Robredo	4	6	6
(South Africa) J Coetzee (South Africa) C Haggard	6	3	4
(Spain) A Martín (Spain) A Portas	4	3
8	(Zimbabwe) W Black (Zimbabwe) K Ullyett	6	6

Third round
3	(Sweden) J Björkman (Australia) T Woodbridge	6	3	6
13	(Czech Republic) F Čermák (Czech Republic) L Friedl	3	6	4
(Spain) R Nadal (Spain) T Robredo	3	2
8	(Zimbabwe) W Black (Zimbabwe) K Ullyett	6	6

Quarterfinals
3	(Sweden) J Björkman (Australia) T Woodbridge	6	6
8	(Zimbabwe) W Black (Zimbabwe) K Ullyett	0	2

=== Bottom half ===
==== Section 3 ====
First round
6	(Australia) W Arthurs (Australia) P Hanley	6	7
(Slovakia) K Beck (Slovakia) D Hrbatý	3	6^{4}
WC	(Australia) L Bourgeois (Australia) C Guccione	4	6^{6}
(Germany) K Braasch (Armenia) S Sargsian	6	7
WC	(India) P Amritraj (South Korea) H-T Lee	6^{4}	r
(South Africa) W Ferreira (United States) R Leach	7
(United States) J-M Gambill (United States) B MacPhie	2	4
9	(Argentina) G Etlis (Argentina) M Rodríguez	6	6
14	(Israel) J Erlich (Israel) A Ram	2	6	6
WC	(Spain) JC Ferrero (Spain) G García López	6	4	3
(Spain) Á López Morón (Spain) F Mantilla	4	5
(Argentina) G Gaudio (Croatia) I Karlović	6	7
WC	(Australia) R Durek (Australia) A Jones	7	1	4
(Germany) N Kiefer (Germany) R Schüttler	6^{6}	6	6
(Spain) D Ferrer (Italy) F Volandri	6^{5}	5
4	(The Bahamas) M Knowles (Canada) D Nestor	7	7

Second round
6	(Australia) W Arthurs (Australia) P Hanley	6	6^{6}	3
(Germany) K Braasch (Armenia) S Sargsian	3	7	6
(South Africa) W Ferreira (United States) R Leach	3	7	3
9	(Argentina) G Etlis (Argentina) M Rodríguez	6	6^{3}	6
14	(Israel) J Erlich (Israel) A Ram	6	5	3
(Argentina) G Gaudio (Croatia) I Karlović	3	7	6
(Germany) N Kiefer (Germany) R Schüttler	5	4
4	(The Bahamas) M Knowles (Canada) D Nestor	7	6

Third round
(Germany) K Braasch (Armenia) S Sargsian	5	2
9	(Argentina) G Etlis (Argentina) M Rodríguez	7	6
(Argentina) G Gaudio (Croatia) I Karlović	3	4
4	(The Bahamas) M Knowles (Canada) D Nestor	6	6

Quarterfinals
9	(Argentina) G Etlis (Argentina) M Rodríguez	7	6^{6}	6
4	(The Bahamas) M Knowles (Canada) D Nestor	6^{3}	7	3

==== Section 4 ====
First round
5	(France) M Llodra (France) F Santoro	6	7
(Netherlands) R Sluiter (Netherlands) M Verkerk	2	6^{5}
(Russia) I Andreev (Russia) A Olhovskiy	6	6
(Sweden) J Landsberg (Sweden) R Söderling	3	4
(Austria) J Knowle (Germany) M Kohlmann	6	6
WC	(Australia) N Healey (Australia) S Huss	4	4
(Argentina) JI Chela (Spain) Ó Hernández	6	6^{5}	6
10	(Czech Republic) T Cibulec (India) L Paes	4	7	3
16	(Sweden) S Aspelin (Italy) M Bertolini	6	1	7
(Australia) J Kerr (United States) G Oliver	2	6	6^{3}
(Russia) N Davydenko (Georgia (country)) I Labadze	2	2
(Morocco) H Arazi (France) N Mahut	6	6
(France) J Benneteau (France) A Clément	6^{3}	6	6
(Israel) H Levy (Russia) M Youzhny	7	4	1
(United States) D Bowen (Australia) A Fisher	3	6	3
2	(India) M Bhupathi (Belarus) M Mirnyi	6	4	6

Second round
5	(France) M Llodra (France) F Santoro	6	6
(Russia) I Andreev (Russia) A Olhovskiy	3	2
(Austria) J Knowle (Germany) M Kohlmann	4	6	5
(Argentina) JI Chela (Spain) Ó Hernández	6	4	7
16	(Sweden) S Aspelin (Italy) M Bertolini	3	7	3
(Morocco) H Arazi (France) N Mahut	6	6^{2}	6
(France) J Benneteau (France) A Clément	7	4	4
2	(India) M Bhupathi (Belarus) M Mirnyi	6^{4}	6	6

Third round
5	(France) M Llodra (France) F Santoro	6	3	6
(Argentina) JI Chela (Spain) Ó Hernández	3	6	4
(Morocco) H Arazi (France) N Mahut	3	6^{4}
2	(India) M Bhupathi (Belarus) M Mirnyi	6	7

Quarterfinals
5	(France) M Llodra (France) F Santoro	6	6
2	(India) M Bhupathi (Belarus) M Mirnyi	3	4
