= 2004 Australian Open – Mixed doubles =

Mixed doubles
- 2004 Australian Open

Final
- Champions: (Russia) Elena Bovina (Serbia and Montenegro) Nenad Zimonjić
- Runners-up: (India) Leander Paes (United States) Martina Navratilova
- Score: 6–1, 7–6^{(7–3)}

Details
- Draw: 32
- Seeds: 8

Events
Singles	men	women		boys	girls
Doubles	men	women	mixed	boys	girls
WC Singles	men	women	quad
WC Doubles	men	women	quad
Legends	men	women	mixed
- Australian Open

Elena Bovina and Nenad Zimonjić won the title at the 2004 Australian Open, defeating the defending champions Martina Navratilova and Leander Paes in the final 6–1, 7–6^{(7–3)}.

== Seeds ==
1. (Spain) Virginia Ruano Pascual / (The Bahamas) Mark Knowles (quarterfinals)
2. (Russia) Elena Likhovtseva / (India) Mahesh Bhupathi (first round)
3. (Australia) Rennae Stubbs / (Australia) Todd Woodbridge (first round)
4. (United States) Martina Navratilova / (India) Leander Paes (final)
5. (United States) Lisa Raymond / (Zimbabwe) Kevin Ullyett (quarterfinals)
6. (Zimbabwe) Cara Black / (Zimbabwe) Wayne Black (second round)
7. (Slovakia) Daniela Hantuchová / (Sweden) Jonas Björkman (second round)
8. (Russia) Lina Krasnoroutskaya / (Canada) Daniel Nestor (first round)

== Draw ==
Key

- Q = Qualifier
- WC = Wild card
- LL = Lucky loser
- Alt = Alternate
- ITF = ITF entry
- PR = Protected ranking
- SR = Special ranking
- SE = Special exempt
- JE = Junior exempt
- JR = Junior Accelerator Programme entrant
- CO = College Accelerator Programme entrant
- NG = Next Gen Accelerator Program entrant
- w/o = Walkover
- r = Retired
- d = Defaulted

=== Finals ===
Semifinals
(South Africa) Liezel Huber (Israel) Jonathan Erlich	4	4
4	(United States) Martina Navratilova (India) Leander Paes	6	6
(Italy) Rita Grande (Argentina) Martín Rodríguez	3	6^{6}
(Russia) Elena Bovina (Serbia and Montenegro) Nenad Zimonjić	6	7^{8}

Final
4	(United States) Martina Navratilova (India) Leander Paes	1	6^{3}
(Russia) Elena Bovina (Serbia and Montenegro) Nenad Zimonjić	6	7^{7}

=== Top half ===
First round
1	(Spain) V Ruano Pascual (The Bahamas) M Knowles	6	6^{0}	[10]
WC	(Japan) S Asagoe (Japan) T Shimada	4	7^{7}	[2]
(Japan) N Miyagi (United States) J Palmer	3	2
(Slovakia) J Husárová (Czech Republic) L Friedl	6	6
(South Africa) L Huber (Israel) J Erlich	6	7^{7}
WC	(Australia) N Pratt (Australia) J Kerr	5	6^{5}
(Slovenia) K Srebotnik (United States) M Bryan	6^{4}	3
6	(Zimbabwe) C Black (Zimbabwe) W Black	7^{7}	6
4	(United States) M Navratilova (India) L Paes	6	7^{7}
(France) É Loit (South Africa) C Haggard	3	6^{3}
(Indonesia) A Widjaja (Argentina) L Arnold Ker	6	6
WC	(Australia) C Dellacqua (Australia) C Guccione	2	4
(Venezuela) M Vento-Kabchi (Argentina) M Hood	3	1
WC	(Australia) T Musgrave (Australia) P Hanley	6	6
WC	(Australia) E Dominikovic (Australia) M Kratzmann	1	2
7	(Slovakia) D Hantuchová (Sweden) J Björkman	6	6

Second round
1	(Spain) V Ruano Pascual (The Bahamas) M Knowles	w/o
(Slovakia) J Husárová (Czech Republic) L Friedl
(South Africa) L Huber (Israel) J Erlich	6	5	[10]
6	(Zimbabwe) C Black (Zimbabwe) W Black	3	7	[5]
4	(United States) M Navratilova (India) L Paes	w/o
(Indonesia) A Widjaja (Argentina) L Arnold Ker
WC	(Australia) T Musgrave (Australia) P Hanley	3	7	[10]
7	(Slovakia) D Hantuchová (Sweden) J Björkman	6	5	[1]

Quarterfinals
1	(Spain) V Ruano Pascual (The Bahamas) M Knowles	7^{8}	3	[5]
(South Africa) L Huber (Israel) J Erlich	6^{6}	6	[10]
4	(United States) M Navratilova (India) L Paes	6	3	[10]
WC	(Australia) T Musgrave (Australia) P Hanley	3	6	[7]

Semifinals
(South Africa) L Huber (Israel) J Erlich	4	4
4	(United States) M Navratilova (India) L Paes	6	6

=== Bottom half ===
First round
8	(Russia) L Krasnoroutskaya (Canada) D Nestor	5	2
(Switzerland) E Gagliardi (Argentina) S Prieto	7	6
(Italy) R Grande (Argentina) M Rodríguez	6	4	[10]
(Spain) M Serna (The Bahamas) M Merklein	3	6	[8]
WC	(Russia) E Dementieva (Armenia) S Sargsian	5	6	[10]
(Belgium) E Callens (South Africa) R Koenig	7	4	[3]
(United States) C Morariu (Czech Republic) M Damm	6	1	[10]
3	(Australia) R Stubbs (Australia) T Woodbridge	4	6	[8]
5	(United States) L Raymond (Zimbabwe) K Ullyett	6	6
(Hungary) P Mandula (Israel) A Ram	3	4
WC	(Australia) L McShea (United States) R Leach	6^{2}	6^{6}
(Switzerland) M Casanova (Czech Republic) C Suk	7^{7}	7^{8}
(Austria) P Wartusch (Czech Republic) F Čermák	2	5
(Russia) E Bovina (Serbia and Montenegro) N Zimonjić	6	7
(Slovenia) T Križan (South Africa) J Coetzee	7^{7}	4	[10]
2	(Russia) E Likhovtseva (India) M Bhupathi	6^{5}	6	[8]

Second round
(Switzerland) E Gagliardi (Argentina) S Prieto	6^{4}	3
(Italy) R Grande (Argentina) M Rodríguez	7^{7}	6
WC	(Russia) E Dementieva (Armenia) S Sargsian	^{w/o}
(United States) C Morariu (Czech Republic) M Damm
5	(United States) L Raymond (Zimbabwe) K Ullyett	6	6
(Switzerland) M Casanova (Czech Republic) C Suk	2	3
(Russia) E Bovina (Serbia and Montenegro) N Zimonjić	3	6	[10]
(Slovenia) T Križan (South Africa) J Coetzee	6	2	[5]

Quarterfinals
(Italy) R Grande (Argentina) M Rodríguez	^{w/o}
WC	(Russia) E Dementieva (Armenia) S Sargsian
5	(United States) L Raymond (Zimbabwe) K Ullyett	2	4
(Russia) E Bovina (Serbia and Montenegro) N Zimonjić	6	6

Semifinals
(Italy) R Grande (Argentina) M Rodríguez	3	6^{6}
(Russia) E Bovina (Serbia and Montenegro) N Zimonjić	6	7^{8}
