= 2004 Australian Open – Boys' singles =

Boys' singles
- 2004 Australian Open

Final
- Champion: (France) Gaël Monfils
- Runner-up: (France) Josselin Ouanna
- Score: 6–0, 6–3

Events
Singles	men	women		boys	girls
Doubles	men	women	mixed	boys	girls
WC Singles	men	women	quad
WC Doubles	men	women	quad
Legends	men	women	mixed
- Australian Open

Marcos Baghdatis was the defending champion, but did not compete in the Juniors in this year.

Gaël Monfils defeated Josselin Ouanna (6–0, 6–3) in the final.

== Seeds ==
1. (Germany) Sebastian Rieschick (second round)
2. (Germany) Mischa Zverev (quarterfinals)
3. (United States) Brendan Evans (quarterfinals)
4. (India) Karan Rastogi (semifinals)
5. (United States) Scott Oudsema (third round)
6. (Brazil) Bruno Rosa (third round)
7. (France) Josselin Ouanna (final)
8. (France) Gaël Monfils (champion)
9. (Netherlands) Remko de Rijke (first round)
10. (South Africa) Fritz Wolmarans (third round)
11. (France) Julien Gely (second round)
12. (South Korea) Kim Sun-yong (third round)
13. (United States) Scoville Jenkins (quarterfinals)
14. (South Korea) Woong-Sun Jun (first round)
15. (Croatia) Vilim Višak (first round)
16. (New Zealand) William Ward (first round)

== Draw ==
Key

- Q = Qualifier
- WC = Wild card
- LL = Lucky loser
- Alt = Alternate
- ITF = ITF entry
- PR = Protected ranking
- SR = Special ranking
- SE = Special exempt
- JE = Junior exempt
- JR = Junior Accelerator Programme entrant
- CO = College Accelerator Programme entrant
- NG = Next Gen Accelerator Program entrant
- w/o = Walkover
- r = Retired
- d = Defaulted

=== Finals ===
Quarterfinals
13	(United States) Scoville Jenkins	4	1
8	(France) Gaël Monfils	6	6
4	(India) Karan Rastogi	6	7
(Italy) Fabio Fognini	1	5
7	(France) Josselin Ouanna	6	7
3	(United States) Brendan Evans	3	5
(Serbia and Montenegro) Novak Djokovic	6	6
2	(Germany) Mischa Zverev	1	4

Semifinals
8	(France) Gaël Monfils	6	6
4	(India) Karan Rastogi	2	2
7	(France) Josselin Ouanna	6	6
(Serbia and Montenegro) Novak Djokovic	4	4

Final
8	(France) Gaël Monfils	6	6
7	(France) Josselin Ouanna	0	3

=== Top half ===
==== Section 1 ====
First round
1	(Germany) Sebastian Rieschick	6	7
Q	(Australia) Tomas Habsuda	2	5
(Austria) Martin Fischer	3	2
(Slovenia) Grega Žemlja	6	6
(Australia) Patrick Jozwik	2	2
(Finland) Juho Paukku	6	6
(India) Tushar Liberhan	4	6	1
13	(United States) Scoville Jenkins	6	3	6
10	(South Africa) Fritz Wolmarans	7^{7}	6
Q	(Canada) Érik Chvojka	6^{4}	2
WC	(Australia) David Jeflea	7^{7}	6
WC	(Australia) Steven Goh	6^{5}	3
(Thailand) Weerapat Doakmaiklee	6	3	1
Q	(United States) Maciek Sykut	2	6	6
(Sweden) Ervin Eleskovic	2	3^{r}
8	(France) Gaël Monfils	6	5

Second round
1	(Germany) S Rieschick	7^{8}	4	4
(Slovenia) G Žemlja	6^{6}	6	6
(Finland) J Paukku	6^{6}	3
13	(United States) S Jenkins	7^{8}	6
10	(South Africa) F Wolmarans	6	7^{7}
WC	(Australia) D Jeflea	4	6^{3}
Q	(United States) M Sykut	0	2
8	(France) G Monfils	6	6

Third round
(Slovenia) G Žemlja	6^{3}	3
13	(United States) S Jenkins	7^{7}	6
10	(South Africa) F Wolmarans	2	4
8	(France) G Monfils	6	6

Quarterfinals
13	(United States) S Jenkins	4	1
8	(France) G Monfils	6	6

==== Section 2 ====
First round
4	(India) Karan Rastogi	6	6
(Indonesia) Sunu-Wahyu Trijati	2	2
(United Kingdom) Miles Kasiri	6	6
Q	(Croatia) Tonci Peric	0	1
(Slovenia) Blaž Kavčič	6^{1}	1^{r}
(Switzerland) Michael Kurz	7^{7}	4
(Chinese Taipei) Chu-Huan Yi	7^{9}	7^{7}
14	(South Korea) Woong-Sun Jun	6^{7}	6^{5}
9	(Netherlands) Remko de Rijke	3	5
(Ukraine) Sergei Bubka	6	7
(Germany) Aljoscha Thron	7	4	3
(Italy) Fabio Fognini	5	6	6
WC	(Australia) Todd Ley	5	6	4
(Australia) Joel Kerley	7	1	6
(Slovakia) Lukáš Lacko	3	3
5	(United States) Scott Oudsema	6	6

Second round
4	(India) K Rastogi	6	6
(United Kingdom) M Kasiri	1	3
(Switzerland) M Kurz	6	5	1
(Chinese Taipei) C-H Yi	3	7	6
(Ukraine) S Bubka	2	4
(Italy) F Fognini	6	6
(Australia) J Kerley	6	4	1
5	(United States) S Oudsema	3	6	6

Third round
4	(India) K Rastogi	6	7^{7}
(Chinese Taipei) C-H Yi	1	6^{1}
(Italy) F Fognini	6	4	12
5	(United States) S Oudsema	4	6	10

Quarterfinals
4	(India) K Rastogi	6	7
(Italy) F Fognini	1	5

=== Bottom half ===
==== Section 3 ====
First round
7	(France) Josselin Ouanna	4	6	6
Q	(South Africa) Thomas Liversage	6	2	1
WC	(Australia) Andrew Coelho	5	7^{8}	6
(India) Divij Sharan	7	6^{6}	4
WC	(Australia) Steven Popovic	6	6
WC	(Australia) Steven Fotakis	4	3
WC	(Australia) David Galic	2	1
12	(South Korea) Kim Sun-yong	6	6
15	(Croatia) Vilim Višak	2	3
(Netherlands) Coen van Keulen	6	6
(Italy) Gianluca Naso	6	5	2
(Germany) Andreas Weber	2	7	6
(Ukraine) Sergiy Stakhovsky	6	6
Q	(Solomon Islands) Michael Leong	3	2
(Austria) Philipp Oswald	6^{4}	1
3	(United States) Brendan Evans	7^{7}	6

Second round
7	(France) J Ouanna	6	6
WC	(Australia) A Coelho	4	2
WC	(Australia) S Popovic	4	6	6
12	(South Korea) S-y Kim	6	4	8
(Netherlands) C van Keulen	2	7	2
(Germany) A Weber	6	5	6
(Ukraine) S Stakhovsky	5	6	3
3	(United States) B Evans	7	4	6

Third round
7	(France) J Ouanna	6	3	8
12	(South Korea) S-y Kim	4	6	6
(Germany) A Weber	0	4
3	(United States) B Evans	6	6

Quarterfinals
7	(France) J Ouanna	6	7
3	(United States) B Evans	3	5

==== Section 4 ====
First round
6	(Brazil) Bruno Rosa	6	6
(United States) Robert Cameron	2	0
Q	(Australia) Miles Armstrong	5	6	6
Q	(South Africa) David North	7	3	3
(Mexico) Luis Díaz Barriga	1	2
(Serbia and Montenegro) Novak Djokovic	6	6
(Ukraine) Ivan Sergeyev	1	4
11	(France) Julien Gely	6	6
16	(New Zealand) William Ward	4	1
(Slovenia) Nejc Podkrajšek	6	6
(Germany) Julian Reister	6	6^{5}	8
(United Kingdom) Matthew Brown	3	7^{7}	6
(Australia) Lachlan Ferguson	6^{10}	6	6
(Switzerland) Stefan Kilchhofer	7^{12}	3	0
WC	(Australia) Alexander Petropoulos	2	1
2	(Germany) Mischa Zverev	6	6

Second round
6	(Brazil) B Rosa	3	6	6
Q	(Australia) M Armstrong	6	2	3
(Serbia and Montenegro) N Djokovic	6	6
11	(France) J Gely	1	1
(Slovenia) N Podkrajšek	6	6
(Germany) J Reister	2	4
(Australia) L Ferguson
2	(Germany) M Zverev	w/o

Third round
6	(Brazil) B Rosa	3	5
(Serbia and Montenegro) N Djokovic	6	7
(Slovenia) N Podkrajšek	1	2
2	(Germany) M Zverev	6	6

Quarterfinals
(Serbia and Montenegro) N Djokovic	6	6
2	(Germany) M Zverev	1	4

== Sources ==
- Draw
