= 2004 Australian Open – Boys' doubles =

Boys' doubles
- 2004 Australian Open

Final
- Champion: (United States) Brendan Evans (United States) Scott Oudsema
- Runner-up: (Australia) David Galić (Australia) David Jeflea
- Score: 6–1, 6–1

Events
Singles	men	women		boys	girls
Doubles	men	women	mixed	boys	girls
WC Singles	men	women	quad
WC Doubles	men	women	quad
Legends	men	women	mixed
- Australian Open

Scott Oudsema and Phillip Simmonds were the defending champions, but only Scott Oudsema competed that year with Brendan Evans.

Brendan Evans and Scott Oudsema won in the final 6–1, 6–1 against David Galić and David Jeflea.

== Seeds ==
1. (United States) Brendan Evans / (United States) Scott Oudsema (champions)
2. (France) Gaël Monfils / (France) Josselin Ouanna (semifinals, withdrew)
3. (Brazil) Bruno Rosa / (Croatia) Vilim Višak (first round)
4. (South Korea) Jun Woong-sun / (South Korea) Kim Sun-yong (first round)
5. (Germany) Sebastian Rieschick / (Germany) Andreas Weber (quarterfinals)
6. (Netherlands) Remko de Rijke / (Netherlands) Coen van Keulen (quarterfinals)
7. (India) Karan Rastogi / (India) Divij Sharan (first round)
8. (United Kingdom) Miles Kasiri / (South Africa) Fritz Wolmarans (first round)

== Draw ==
Key

- Q = Qualifier
- WC = Wild card
- LL = Lucky loser
- Alt = Alternate
- ITF = ITF entry
- PR = Protected ranking
- SR = Special ranking
- SE = Special exempt
- JE = Junior exempt
- JR = Junior Accelerator Programme entrant
- CO = College Accelerator Programme entrant
- NG = Next Gen Accelerator Program entrant
- w/o = Walkover
- r = Retired
- d = Defaulted

=== Finals ===
Semifinals
1	(United States) Brendan Evans (United States) Scott Oudsema	6	7
(Serbia and Montenegro) Novak Djokovic (United States) Scoville Jenkins	3	5
WC	(Australia) David Galić (Australia) David Jeflea	w/o
2	(France) Gaël Monfils (France) Josselin Ouanna

Final
1	(United States) Brendan Evans (United States) Scott Oudsema	6	6
WC	(Australia) David Galić (Australia) David Jeflea	1	1

=== Top half ===
First round
1	(United States) Brendan Evans (United States) Scott Oudsema	6	6
(Austria) Martin Fischer (Austria) Philipp Oswald	2	0
(Mexico) Luis Díaz Barriga (United States) Maciek Sykut	6	6^{4}	2
(Thailand) Weerapat Doakmaiklee (India) Tushar Liberhan	1	7^{7}	6
(Slovenia) Nejc Podkrajšek (Slovenia) Grega Žemlja	6	6
(France) Julien Gely (New Zealand) Matthew Stark	4	2
WC	(Australia) Steven Fotakis (Australia) Steven Popovic	2	2
5	(Germany) Sebastian Rieschick (Germany) Andreas Weber	6	6
4	(South Korea) Jun Woong-sun (South Korea) Kim Sun-yong	3	6	3
(Italy) Fabio Fognini (Italy) Gianluca Naso	6	3	6
(Australia) Miles Armstrong (Australia) Brenton Bacon	6	6
(Australia) Adam Hubble (Solomon Islands) Michael Leong	3	4
(Kazakhstan) Syrym Abdukhalikov (Australia) Andrew Coelho
(Indonesia) Sunu-Wahyu Trijati (Chinese Taipei) Chu-Huan Yi	w/o
(Serbia and Montenegro) Novak Djokovic (United States) Scoville Jenkins	6	3	6
8	(United Kingdom) Miles Kasiri (South Africa) Fritz Wolmarans	4	6	3

Second round
1	(United States) B Evans (United States) S Oudsema	7	7
(Thailand) W Doakmaiklee (India) T Liberhan	5	5
(Slovenia) N Podkrajšek (Slovenia) G Žemlja	4	6	5
5	(Germany) S Rieschick (Germany) A Weber	6	2	7
(Italy) F Fognini (Italy) G Naso	6	4	6^{2}
(Australia) M Armstrong (Australia) B Bacon	4	6	7^{7}
(Indonesia) S-W Trijati (Chinese Taipei) C-H Yi	1	6^{3}
(Serbia and Montenegro) N Djokovic (United States) S Jenkins	6	7^{7}

Quarterfinals
1	(United States) B Evans (United States) S Oudsema	6	7
5	(Germany) S Rieschick (Germany) A Weber	4	5
(Australia) M Armstrong (Australia) B Bacon	5	1
(Serbia and Montenegro) N Djokovic (United States) S Jenkins	7	6

Semifinals
1	(United States) B Evans (United States) S Oudsema	6	7
(Serbia and Montenegro) N Djokovic (United States) S Jenkins	3	5

=== Bottom half ===
First round
7	(India) Karan Rastogi (India) Divij Sharan	6	5	0
(South Africa) Thomas Liversage (Croatia) Tonci Peric	4	7	6
(United States) Robert Cameron (Canada) Érik Chvojka	3	3
(Switzerland) Stefan Kilchhofer (Switzerland) Michael Kurz	6	6
(Ukraine) Sergei Bubka (Ukraine) Sergiy Stakhovsky	4	6	6
(Australia) Nathan Byrnes (Australia) Alexander Petropoulos	6	3	4
WC	(Australia) David Galić (Australia) David Jeflea	6	6^{10}	7
3	(Brazil) Bruno Rosa (Croatia) Vilim Višak	3	7^{12}	6
6	(Netherlands) Remko de Rijke (Netherlands) Coen van Keulen	7	6
(Finland) Juho Paukku (Ukraine) Ivan Sergeyev	5	1
WC	(Australia) Michael Look (Australia) Zachary van Min	2	6	2
(Australia) Patrick Jozwik (Slovakia) Lukáš Lacko	6	2	6
(United Kingdom) Matthew Brown (New Zealand) William Ward	6	1	6
(Germany) Julian Reister (Germany) Mischa Zverev	4	6	3
WC	(Australia) Steven Goh (Australia) Kenneth Prajoga	6	2	4
2	(France) Gaël Monfils (France) Josselin Ouanna	4	6	6

Second round
(South Africa) T Liversage (Croatia) T Peric	7^{7}	7
(Switzerland) S Kilchhofer (Switzerland) M Kurz	6^{2}	5
(Ukraine) S Bubka (Ukraine) S Stakhovsky	5	6	4
WC	(Australia) D Galić (Australia) D Jeflea	7	4	6
6	(Netherlands) R de Rijke (Netherlands) C van Keulen	6	6
(Australia) P Jozwik (Slovakia) L Lacko	3	1
(United Kingdom) M Brown (New Zealand) W Ward	6	1	1
2	(France) G Monfils (France) J Ouanna	2	6	6

Quarterfinals
(South Africa) T Liversage (Croatia) T Peric	5	4
WC	(Australia) D Galić (Australia) D Jeflea	7	6
6	(Netherlands) R de Rijke (Netherlands) C van Keulen	2	2
2	(France) G Monfils (France) J Ouanna	6	6

Semifinals
WC	(Australia) D Galić (Australia) D Jeflea	w/o
2	(France) G Monfils (France) J Ouanna
