= 2004 Australian Open – Women's doubles =

Women's doubles
- 2004 Australian Open

Final
- Champions: (Spain) Virginia Ruano Pascual (Argentina) Paola Suárez
- Runners-up: (Russia) Svetlana Kuznetsova (Russia) Elena Likhovtseva
- Score: 6–4, 6–3

Details
- Draw: 64
- Seeds: 16

Events
Singles	men	women		boys	girls
Doubles	men	women	mixed	boys	girls
WC Singles	men	women	quad
WC Doubles	men	women	quad
Legends	men	women	mixed
- Australian Open

Serena Williams and Venus Williams were the defending champions, but Serena withdrew from the tournament (due to an injury) and Venus didn't want to participate with another player.

Virginia Ruano Pascual and Paola Suárez reached the final of the Australian Open for the second time (in 2003 they lost to Williams sisters). This time they won in the final 6–4, 6–3, against Svetlana Kuznetsova and Elena Likhovtseva.

== Seeds ==
1. (Spain) Virginia Ruano Pascual / (Argentina) Paola Suárez (champions)
2. (United States) Martina Navratilova / (United States) Lisa Raymond (second round)
3. (South Africa) Liezel Huber / (Japan) Ai Sugiyama (semifinals)
4. (Russia) Svetlana Kuznetsova / (Russia) Elena Likhovtseva (final)
5. (Zimbabwe) Cara Black / (Australia) Rennae Stubbs (first round)
6. (Venezuela) María Vento-Kabchi / (Indonesia) Angelique Widjaja (quarterfinals)
7. (Bulgaria) Magdalena Maleeva / (Spain) Conchita Martínez (third round)
8. (Russia) Nadia Petrova / (United States) Meghann Shaughnessy (third round)
9. (France) Émilie Loit / (Australia) Nicole Pratt (second round)
10. (Hungary) Petra Mandula / (Austria) Patricia Wartusch (third round)
11. (Belgium) Els Callens / (Slovakia) Daniela Hantuchová (first round)
12. (Russia) Elena Dementieva / (Russia) Lina Krasnoroutskaya (second round)
13. (France) Marion Bartoli / (Switzerland) Myriam Casanova (third round)
14. (Slovenia) Tina Križan / (Slovenia) Katarina Srebotnik (third round)
15. (Austria) Barbara Schett / (Switzerland) Patty Schnyder (second round)
16. (China) Li Ting / (China) Sun Tiantian (third round)

== Draw ==
Key

- Q = Qualifier
- WC = Wild card
- LL = Lucky loser
- Alt = Alternate
- ITF = ITF entry
- PR = Protected ranking
- SR = Special ranking
- SE = Special exempt
- JE = Junior exempt
- JR = Junior Accelerator Programme entrant
- CO = College Accelerator Programme entrant
- NG = Next Gen Accelerator Program entrant
- w/o = Walkover
- r = Retired
- d = Defaulted

=== Finals ===
Quarterfinals
1	(Spain) Virginia Ruano Pascual (Argentina) Paola Suárez	6	6
(Switzerland) Emmanuelle Gagliardi (Italy) Roberta Vinci	3	2
3	(South Africa) Liezel Huber (Japan) Ai Sugiyama	6	6
(Slovakia) Janette Husárová (Russia) Dinara Safina	2	3
(China) Yan Zi (China) Zheng Jie	4	4
4	(Russia) Svetlana Kuznetsova (Russia) Elena Likhovtseva	6	6
6	(Venezuela) María Vento-Kabchi (Indonesia) Angelique Widjaja	6	4	6^{2}
(Estonia) Maret Ani (Czech Republic) Libuše Průšová	2	6	7^{7}

Semifinals
1	(Spain) Virginia Ruano Pascual (Argentina) Paola Suárez	6	7^{7}
3	(South Africa) Liezel Huber (Japan) Ai Sugiyama	4	6^{5}
4	(Russia) Svetlana Kuznetsova (Russia) Elena Likhovtseva	6	6
(Estonia) Maret Ani (Czech Republic) Libuše Průšová	2	4

Final
1	(Spain) Virginia Ruano Pascual (Argentina) Paola Suárez	6	6
4	(Russia) Svetlana Kuznetsova (Russia) Elena Likhovtseva	4	3

=== Top half ===
==== Section 1 ====
First round
1	(Spain) V Ruano Pascual (Argentina) P Suárez	6	6
(Japan) N Miyagi (United States) S Perry	1	3
(Italy) T Garbin (Italy) F Pennetta	2	4
(Argentina) G Dulko (Venezuela) M Sequera	6	6
(Japan) S Asagoe (Japan) S Obata	6	6
(Australia) E Dominikovic (Russia) A Rodionova	1	4
(Indonesia) W Prakusya (Ukraine) E Tatarkova	0	2
16	(China) T Li (China) T Sun	6	6
12	(Russia) E Dementieva (Russia) L Krasnoroutskaya	6	6^{4}	6
(Australia) T Musgrave (United States) A Spears	1	7^{7}	2
(Switzerland) E Gagliardi (Italy) R Vinci	6	6
(Croatia) S Talaja (Romania) A Vanc	4	2
(Russia) M Sharapova (Thailand) T Tanasugarn	6	6
WC	(Australia) L Breadmore (Australia) S Ferguson	2	2
(Czech Republic) D Bedáňová (Czech Republic) R Voráčová	2	2
8	(Russia) N Petrova (United States) M Shaughnessy	6	6

Second round
1	(Spain) V Ruano Pascual (Argentina) P Suárez	6	6
(Argentina) G Dulko (Venezuela) M Sequera	1	3
(Japan) S Asagoe (Japan) S Obata	0	2
16	(China) T Li (China) T Sun	6	6
12	(Russia) E Dementieva (Russia) L Krasnoroutskaya	2	6^{1}
(Switzerland) E Gagliardi (Italy) R Vinci	6	7^{7}
(Russia) M Sharapova (Thailand) T Tanasugarn	1^{r}
8	(Russia) N Petrova (United States) M Shaughnessy	4

Third round
1	(Spain) V Ruano Pascual (Argentina) P Suárez	7	6
16	(China) T Li (China) T Sun	5	3
(Switzerland) E Gagliardi (Italy) R Vinci	6	6
8	(Russia) N Petrova (United States) M Shaughnessy	3	2

Quarterfinals
1	(Spain) V Ruano Pascual (Argentina) P Suárez	6	6
(Switzerland) E Gagliardi (Italy) R Vinci	3	2

==== Section 2 ====
First round
3	(South Africa) L Huber (Japan) A Sugiyama	6	6
(France) S Cohen-Aloro (Spain) M Serna	3	3
(Russia) E Kulikovskaya (Ukraine) T Perebiynis	4	4
WC	(Australia) C Dellacqua (Australia) N Sewell	6	6
(Ukraine) Y Beygelzimer (Belarus) T Poutchek	6	6
WC	(Australia) C Barclay (Australia) C Horiatopoulos	2	2
(Italy) S Farina Elia (Italy) F Schiavone	3	5
13	(France) M Bartoli (Switzerland) M Casanova	6	7
11	(Belgium) E Callens (Slovakia) D Hantuchová	5	4
(Slovakia) J Husárová (Russia) D Safina	7	6
(United States) L Granville (United States) B Mattek	7	4	6
(Spain) A Medina Garrigues (Argentina) ME Salerni	5	6	1
(Hungary) Z Gubacsi (Netherlands) C Vis	2	6	6
(Russia) A Jidkova (Japan) A Morigami	6	4	2
PR	(Russia) T Panova (Serbia and Montenegro) D Zarić	6^{2}	2
7	(Bulgaria) M Maleeva (Spain) C Martínez	7^{7}	6

Second round
3	(South Africa) L Huber (Japan) A Sugiyama	6	6
WC	(Australia) C Dellacqua (Australia) N Sewell	3	2
(Ukraine) Y Beygelzimer (Belarus) T Poutchek	6^{5}	0
13	(France) M Bartoli (Switzerland) M Casanova	7^{7}	6
(Slovakia) J Husárová (Russia) D Safina	6	6
(United States) L Granville (United States) B Mattek	4	3
(Hungary) Z Gubacsi (Netherlands) C Vis	1	4
7	(Bulgaria) M Maleeva (Spain) C Martínez	6	6

Third round
3	(South Africa) L Huber (Japan) A Sugiyama	5	6	6
13	(France) M Bartoli (Switzerland) M Casanova	7	3	3
(Slovakia) J Husárová (Russia) D Safina	6	6
7	(Bulgaria) M Maleeva (Spain) C Martínez	4	4

Quarterfinals
3	(South Africa) L Huber (Japan) A Sugiyama	6	6
(Slovakia) J Husárová (Russia) D Safina	2	3

=== Bottom half ===
==== Section 3 ====
First round
5	(Zimbabwe) C Black (Australia) R Stubbs	4	2
(China) Z Yan (China) J Zheng	6	6
(Hungary) K Marosi (Italy) M Santangelo	6^{2}	4
(Canada) S Jeyaseelan (Croatia) J Kostanić	7^{7}	6
WC	(Australia) M Adamczak (Australia) J Hewitt	6	0	2
(United States) S Reeves (Italy) Ad Serra Zanetti	4	6	6
WC	(Spain) M Marrero (Ukraine) J Vakulenko	4	2
9	(France) É Loit (Australia) N Pratt	6	6
14	(Slovenia) T Križan (Slovenia) K Srebotnik	6	7
(Bosnia and Herzegovina) M Jugić-Salkić (Croatia) D Jurak	3	5
(United States) J Craybas (Spain) C Martínez Granados	4	4
(United States) J Hopkins (Chinese Taipei) J Lee	6	6
(France) S Foretz (Italy) An Serra Zanetti	1	6	3
(Australia) B Stewart (Australia) S Stosur	6	3	6
(Argentina) C Fernández (Slovakia) H Nagyová	3	4
4	(Russia) S Kuznetsova (Russia) E Likhovtseva	6	6

Second round
(China) Z Yan (China) J Zheng	7	6
(Canada) S Jeyaseelan (Croatia) J Kostanić	5	1
(United States) S Reeves (Italy) Ad Serra Zanetti	6	6^{4}	6
9	(France) É Loit (Australia) N Pratt	3	7^{7}	2
14	(Slovenia) T Križan (Slovenia) K Srebotnik	1	6	6
(United States) J Hopkins (Chinese Taipei) J Lee	6	3	2
(Australia) B Stewart (Australia) S Stosur	6	3	1
4	(Russia) S Kuznetsova (Russia) E Likhovtseva	4	6	6

Third round
(China) Z Yan (China) J Zheng	7	6
(United States) S Reeves (Italy) Ad Serra Zanetti	5	3
14	(Slovenia) T Križan (Slovenia) K Srebotnik	5	0
4	(Russia) S Kuznetsova (Russia) E Likhovtseva	7	6

Quarterfinals
(China) Z Yan (China) J Zheng	4	4
4	(Russia) S Kuznetsova (Russia) E Likhovtseva	6	6

==== Section 4 ====
First round
6	(Venezuela) M Vento-Kabchi (Indonesia) A Widjaja	6	6
(United States) J Embry (United States) M Washington	3	2
(Russia) G Fattakhetdinova (Russia) G Fokina	4	7^{7}	3
(France) C Dhenin (Australia) L McShea	6	6^{5}	6
(Russia) A Myskina (Russia) V Zvonareva	4	2
(Sweden) Å Svensson (United States) M Tu	6	6
WC	(Hungary) M Czink (Hungary) A Kapros	6^{7}	1
10	(Hungary) P Mandula (Austria) P Wartusch	7^{9}	6
15	(Austria) B Schett (Switzerland) P Schnyder	6	7^{7}
(United States) A Cargill (United States) A Harkleroad	3	6^{2}
(Estonia) M Ani (Czech Republic) L Průšová	6	6
(Czech Republic) I Benešová (Australia) C Wheeler	2	4
(United States) L Davenport (United States) C Morariu	6	4	6
(Greece) E Daniilidou (Italy) R Grande	3	6	1
WC	(Japan) S Okamoto (Japan) R Takemura	0	1
2	(United States) M Navratilova (United States) L Raymond	6	6

Second round
6	(Venezuela) M Vento-Kabchi (Indonesia) A Widjaja	6	6
(France) C Dhenin (Australia) L McShea	2	4
(Sweden) Å Svensson (United States) M Tu	4	6	3
10	(Hungary) P Mandula (Austria) P Wartusch	6	3	6
15	(Austria) B Schett (Switzerland) P Schnyder	3	2
(Estonia) M Ani (Czech Republic) L Průšová	6	6
(United States) L Davenport (United States) C Morariu	6	6
2	(United States) M Navratilova (United States) L Raymond	3	0

Third round
6	(Venezuela) M Vento-Kabchi (Indonesia) A Widjaja	6	2	6
10	(Hungary) P Mandula (Austria) P Wartusch	4	6	3
(Estonia) M Ani (Czech Republic) L Průšová	7	5	6
(United States) L Davenport (United States) C Morariu	5	7	3

Quarterfinals
6	(Venezuela) M Vento-Kabchi (Indonesia) A Widjaja	6	4	6^{2}
(Estonia) M Ani (Czech Republic) L Průšová	2	6	7^{7}
