= Veronika Chvojková =

Czech tennis player

- Country (sports): Czech Republic
- Born: 31 March 1987 (age 37); Benešov, Czechoslovakia
- Turned pro: 2001
- Plays: Right (two-handed backhand)
- Prize money: $73,261

Singles
- Career record: 142–136
- Career titles: 1 ITF
- Highest ranking: No. 250 (20 May 2008)

Doubles
- Career record: 81–68
- Career titles: 8 ITF
- Highest ranking: No. 172 (26 February 2007)

Veronika Chvojková (born 31 March 1987) is a Czech former professional tennis player.

Her career-high singles ranking is No. 250, achieved on 26 May 2008, and her highest doubles ranking is No. 172, achieved on 26 February 2007. Over her career, she won one singles and eight doubles titles at tournaments on the ITF Women's Circuit.

== ITF finals ==
$25,000 tournaments
$10,000 tournaments

=== Singles (1–2) ===
| Result | No. | Date | Tournament | Surface | Opponent | Score |
|---|---|---|---|---|---|---|
| Loss | 1. | Aug 2004 | Trecastagni, Italy | Hard | (Argentina) Andrea Benítez | 4–6, 6–4, 3–6 |
| Loss | 2. | Mar 2005 | Bolton, United Kingdom | Hard (i) | (United Kingdom) Anne Keothavong | 6–3, 1–6, 1–6 |
| Win | 3. | Sep 2007 | Nottingham, United Kingdom | Hard | (Sweden) Hanna Nooni | 6–2, 2–1 ret. |

=== Doubles (8–10) ===
| Result | No. | Date | Tournament | Surface | Partner | Opponents | Score |
|---|---|---|---|---|---|---|---|
| Win | 1. | 16 August 2004 | Westende, Belgium | Hard | (Finland) Emma Laine | (Czech Republic) Janette Bejlková (Germany) Tatjana Malek | 6–4, 7–5 |
| Loss | 2. | 23 August 2004 | Trecastagni, Italy | Hard | (Finland) Emma Laine | (Argentina) Andrea Benítez (Uruguay) Estefanía Craciún | 3–6, 6–3, 2–6 |
| Win | 3. | 13 March 2005 | Sunderland, United Kingdom | Hard (i) | (Austria) Verena Amesbauer | (South Africa) Lizaan du Plessis (United Kingdom) Rebecca Llewellyn | 6–3, 6–4 |
| Loss | 4. | 11 October 2005 | Bolton, United Kingdom | Hard (i) | (United Kingdom) Claire Peterzan | (Austria) Daniela Kix (Portugal) Neuza Silva | 0–6, 2–6 |
| Win | 5. | 12 October 2005 | Jersey, United Kingdom | Hard (i) | (Slovakia) Stanislava Hrozenská | (Republic of Ireland) Kelly Liggan (Belarus) Nadejda Ostrovskaya | 4–6, 6–2, 7–5 |
| Loss | 6. | 26 February 2006 | Saint-Georges, Canada | Hard (i) | (Slovakia) Dominika Cibulková | (Italy) Alberta Brianti (Italy) Giulia Casoni | 2–6, 6–3, 1–6 |
| Win | 7. | 9 July 2006 | Valladolid, Spain | Hard | (Ukraine) Yana Levchenko | (Australia) Monique Adamczak (Argentina) Soledad Esperón | 6–1, 7–6^{(11–9)} |
| Loss | 8. | 12 October 2006 | Jersey, United Kingdom | Hard (i) | (United Kingdom) Claire Peterzan | (United Kingdom) Katie O'Brien (Estonia) Margit Rüütel | 5–7, 4–6 |
| Win | 9. | 19 October 2006 | GB Pro-Series Glasgow, United Kingdom | Hard (i) | (Latvia) Līga Dekmeijere | (United Kingdom) Katie O'Brien (Estonia) Margit Rüütel | 6–4, 6–3 |
| Loss | 10. | 4 February 2007 | Belfort, France | Carpet (i) | (Czech Republic) Eva Hrdinová | (France) Iryna Brémond (Israel) Yevgenia Savransky | 3–6, 5–7 |
| Win | 11. | 14 February 2007 | Prague, Czech Republic | Hard (i) | (Czech Republic) Petra Cetkovská | (Slovakia) Katarína Kachlíková (Slovakia) Lenka Tvarošková | 6–2, 6–3 |
| Loss | 12. | 24 March 2007 | Tenerife, Spain | Hard | (Czech Republic) Petra Cetkovská | (Czech Republic) Andrea Hlaváčková (Estonia) Margit Rüütel | 3–2 ret. |
| Win | 13. | 11 August 2007 | Gdynia, Poland | Clay | (Poland) Karolina Kosińska | (Netherlands) Michelle Gerards (Poland) Monika Krauze | 6–1, 7–5 |
| Loss | 14. | 15 October 2007 | GB Pro-Series Glasgow, UK | Hard (i) | (Germany) Kathrin Wörle | (Sweden) Sofia Arvidsson (Sweden) Johanna Larsson | 3–6, 2–6 |
| Win | 15. | 9 December 2007 | Zubr Cup, Czech Republic | Hard (i) | (Czech Republic) Kateřina Vaňková | (Czech Republic) Gabriela Chmelinová (Czech Republic) Michaela Paštiková | 3–6, 6–4, [12–10] |
| Loss | 16. | 6 April 2008 | Hamburg, Germany | Carpet (i) | (Czech Republic) Andrea Hlaváčková | (Switzerland) Stefanie Vögele (Ukraine) Yuliya Beygelzimer | 6–7^{(3–7)}, 2–6 |
| Loss | 17. | 21 March 2009 | Bath, United Kingdom | Hard (i) | (Czech Republic) Kateřina Vaňková | (Switzerland) Stefania Boffa (United Kingdom) Anna Fitzpatrick | 1–6, 1–6 |
| Loss | 18. | 4 April 2010 | Antalya, Turkey | Clay | (Czech Republic) Martina Kubičíková | (Bulgaria) Dalia Zafirova (Romania) Mihaela Buzărnescu | 6–7^{(1)}, 5–7 |
