= Maria Sharapova career statistics =

Career finals
Discipline	Type	Won	Lost	Total
Singles	Grand Slam	5	5	10
Singles	WTA Finals (Note: Formerly known as: Virginia Slims Championships (until 1995); WTA Tour Championships (1995–2013))	1	2	3
Singles	WTA Elite (Note: Elite tier: WTA Tournament of Champions (2009–14); WTA Elite Trophy (2015–present))	–	–	–
Singles	WTA 1000 (Note: Formerly known as: Tier I (1990–2008); WTA Premier Mandatory & Premier 5 (2009–2020))	14	11	25
Singles	WTA 500 (Note: Formerly known as: Tier II (until 2009); WTA Premier (2009–2021))	7	2	9
Singles	WTA 250 (Note: Formerly known as: Tier III, IV & V (until 2009); WTA International (until 2021))	9	2	11
Singles	Olympics	0	1	1
Singles	Total	36	23	59
Doubles	Grand Slam	–	–	–
Doubles	WTA Finals	–	–	–
Doubles	WTA Elite	–	–	–
Doubles	WTA 1000	–	–	–
Doubles	WTA 500	–	–	–
Doubles	WTA 250	3	1	4
Doubles	Olympics	–	–	–
Doubles	Total	3	1	4

This is a list of the main career statistics of professional Russian tennis player, Maria Sharapova, whose career lasted from 2001 to 2020. Sharapova won thirty six WTA singles titles including five Grand Slams, one year-ending championship, six WTA Tier I singles titles, three WTA Premier Mandatory singles titles and five WTA Premier 5 singles titles. Sharapova won her first grand slam singles title at the 2004 Wimbledon Championships by defeating top seed and two-time defending champion, Serena Williams in straight sets. She was also the silver medallist in singles at the 2012 London Olympics. On August 22, 2005, Sharapova became the World No. 1 for the first time in her career, and thus became the first Russian female player to ascend to the top of the WTA rankings.

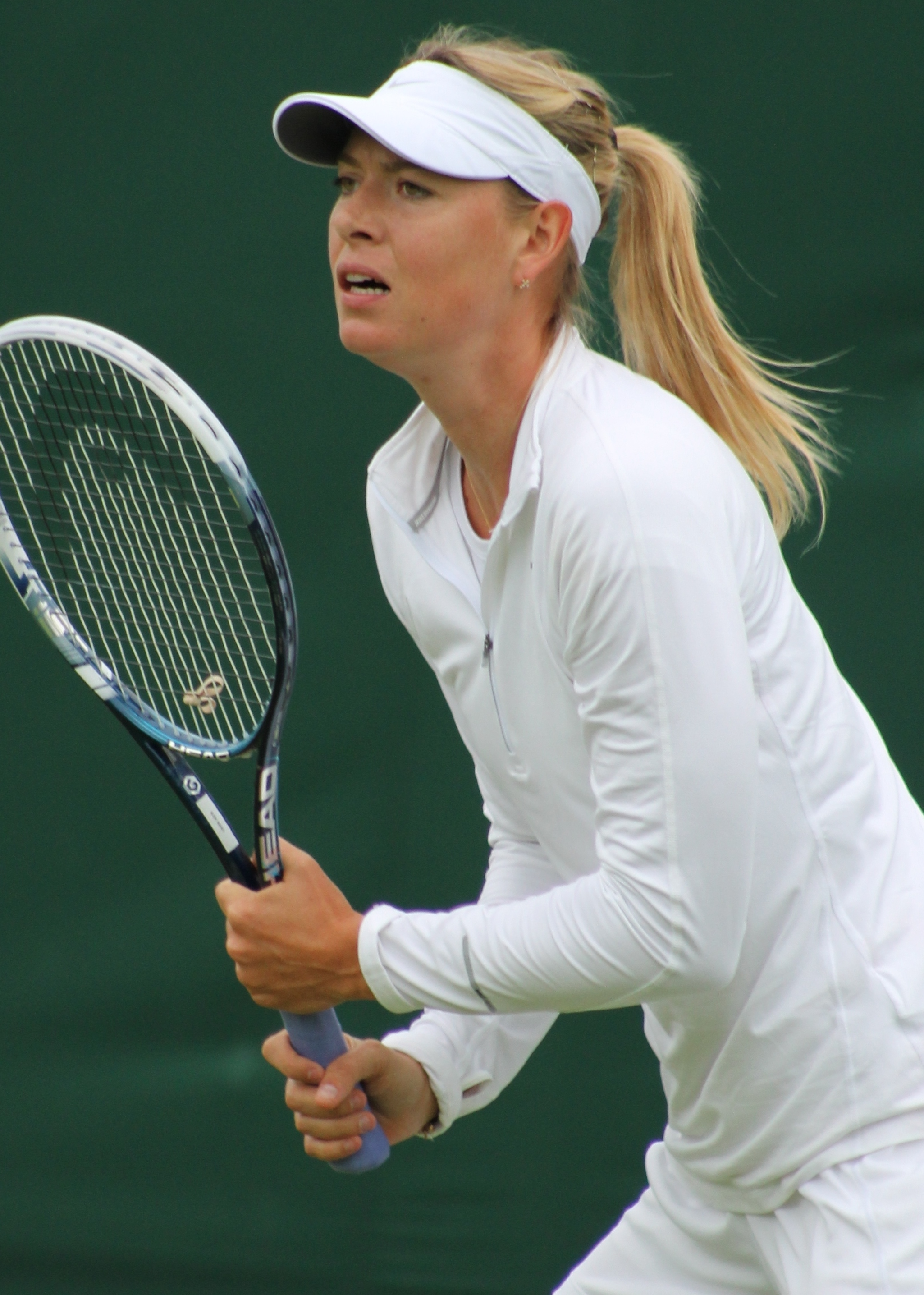
Sharapova at the 2013 Wimbledon Championships.

== Performance timelines ==
Key
W	F	SF	QF	#R	RR	Q#	P#	DNQ	A	Z#	PO	G	S	B	NMS	NTI	P	NH

(W) winner; (F) finalist; (SF) semifinalist; (QF) quarterfinalist; (#R) rounds 4, 3, 2, 1; (RR) round-robin stage; (Q#) qualification round; (P#) preliminary round; (DNQ) did not qualify; (A) absent; (Z#) Davis/Fed Cup Zonal Group (with number indication) or (PO) play-off; (G) gold, (S) silver or (B) bronze Olympic/Paralympic medal; (NMS) not a Masters tournament; (NTI) not a Tier I tournament; (P) postponed; (NH) not held; (SR) strike rate (events won / competed); (W–L) win–loss record.

Only main-draw results in WTA Tour, Grand Slam tournaments, Billie Jean King Cup (Fed Cup), Hopman Cup and Olympic Games are included in win–loss records.

=== Singles ===
Tournament	2001	2002	2003	2004	2005	2006	2007	2008	2009	2010	2011	2012	2013	2014	2015	2016	2017	2018	2019	2020	SR	W–L	Win%
Grand Slam tournaments
Australian Open	A	A	1R	3R	SF	SF	F	W	A	1R	4R	F	SF	4R	F	~~QF~~ (Note: While Sharapova did reach the quarterfinals of the 2016 Australian Open, this result, including ranking points and prize money, was rescinded following a failed drug test during the tournament.)	A	3R	4R	1R	1 / 16	57–15	79%
French Open	A	A	1R	QF	QF	4R	SF	4R	QF	3R	SF	W	F	W	4R	A	A	QF	A	A	2 / 14	56–12	82%
Wimbledon	A	A	4R	W	SF	SF	4R	2R	2R	4R	F	4R	2R	4R	SF	A	A	1R	1R	NH	1 / 15	46–14	77%
US Open	A	A	2R	3R	SF	W	3R	A	3R	4R	3R	SF	A	4R	A	A	4R	4R	1R	A	1 / 13	38–12	76%
Win–loss	0–0	0–0	4–4	15–3	19–4	20–3	16–4	11–2	7–3	8–4	16–4	21–3	12–3	16–3	14–3	0–0	3–1	8–4	3–3	0-1	5 / 58	197–53	79%
Year-end championship
WTA Finals	DNQ			W	SF	SF	F	DNQ			RR	F	A	RR	SF	DNQ				NH	1 / 8	21–11	66%
National representation
Olympic Games	NH			A	NH			A	NH			S	NH			A	NH				0 / 1	5–1	83%
Billie Jean King Cup	A	A	A	A	A	A	A	W	A	A	F	SF	A	A	F	A	A	A	A	A	1 / 4	7–1	88%
WTA 1000 tournaments
Qatar Open	NTI							W	NH		NTI	A	SF	A	NTI	A	NTI	1R	NTI	A	1 / 3	8–2	80%
Dubai Championships	NTI								A	A	A	NTI			A	NTI	A	NTI	A	NTI	0 / 0	0–0	80%
Indian Wells Open	A	2R	1R	4R	SF	W	4R	SF	A	3R	SF	F	W	3R	4R	A	A	1R	A	NH	2 / 14	38–12	76%
Miami Open	A	A	1R	4R	F	F	4R	A	A	A	F	F	F	SF	2R	A	A	A	A	NH	0 / 10	33–10	77%
Madrid Open	NH								A	1R	3R	QF	F	W	SF	A	2R	QF	A	NH	1 / 8	23–7	75%
Italian Open	A	A	A	3R	SF	A	A	SF (Note: Withdraw during the tournament. Not counted as a loss.)	A	A	W	W	QF	3R	W	A	2R	SF	A	A	3 / 10	31–5	86%
Canadian Open	A	A	1R	3R	A	A	A	3R	F	A	3R	A	A	3R	A	A	A	3R	1R	NH	0 / 8	11–7	61%
Cincinnati Open	NH			NTI					A	F	W	A	2R	SF	A	A	A	A	2R	A	1 / 5	14–4	78%
China Open	NH			NTI					3R	2R	A	F	A	W	A	A	3R	A	A	NH	1 / 5	15–4	79%
Wuhan Open	NH													3R	2R	A	A	A	A	NH	0 / 2	1–2	71%
Charleston Open (Note: Former Tier I / Premier Mandatory & 5 / WTA 1000 tournament.)	A	A	1R	A	A	A	A	QF	NTI											NH	0 / 2	2–2	50%
German Open	A	A	A	3R	QF	A	A	A	NH												0 / 2	4–2	50%
San Diego Open	NTI			QF	A	W	W	NH		NTI				NH	NTI	NH					2 / 3	12–1	92%
Pan Pacific Open	A	A	A	2R	W	SF	SF	A	W	1R	QF	QF	A	NTI						NH	2 / 8	19–6	71%
Zurich Open	A	A	A	F	A	W	A	NTI	NH												1 / 2	7–1	88%
Kremlin Cup	A	A	A	A	QF	QF	2R	A	NTI											NH	0 / 3	2–2	50%
Win–loss	0–0	1–1	0–4	15–8	19–5	23–2	11–4	15–2	12–2	7–5	24–5	24–5	21–4	23–6	11–4	0–0	4–3	9–5	1–2	0–0	14 / 85	220–67	77%
Career Statistics
	2001	2002	2003	2004	2005	2006	2007	2008	2009	2010	2011	2012	2013	2014	2015	2016	2017	2018	2019	2020	SR	W–L	Win %
Tournaments	0	2	14	20	15	15	13	9	10	13	14	14	10	16	12	1	8	11	8	2	Career total: 207		
Titles	0	0	2	5	3	5	1	3	1	2	2	3	2	4	2	0	1	0	0	0	Career total: 36		
Finals	0	0	2	6	4	7	4	3	2	5	4	9	5	4	3	0	1	0	0	0	Career total: 59		
Hard win–loss	0–0	1–2	13–8	34–11	29–7	45–5	24–6	19–1	20–5	19–7	25–11	34–8	19–4	27–11	22–5	4–1	11–3	10–6	7–5	0–2	20 / 130	363–108	77%
Clay win–loss	0–0	0–0	0–2	8–3	9–3	3–1	7–2	12–2	6–2	7–2	12–2	18–1	17–2	19–1	12–3	0–0	5–3	10–4	0–0	0–0	11 / 46	145–33	81%
Grass win–loss	0–0	0–0	7–2	12–0	10–1	8–2	7–2	1–1	5–2	7–2	6–1	8–2	1–1	3–1	5–1	0–0	0–0	0–1	1–2	0–0	3 / 24	81–21	79%
Carpet win–loss	0–0	0–0	4–0	1–1	5–1	3–1	2–1	0–0	0–0	0–0	Discontinued										2 / 7	15–4	79%
Overall win–loss	0–0	1–2	24–12	55–15	53–12	59–9	40–11	32–4	31–9	33–11	43–14	60–11	37–7	49–13	39–9	4–1	16–6	20–11	8–7	0–2	36 / 207	604–166	78%
Win %	–	33%	75%	79%	82%	87%	78%	89%	78%	75%	75%	85%	84%	79%	81%	80%	76%	65%	53%	0%	Career total: 78%		
Year-end ranking	NR	186	32	4	4	2	5	9	14	18	4	2	4	2	4	NR	61	29	134	–	$38,777,962		

== Grand Slam tournament finals ==
=== Singles: 10 (5 titles, 5 runner-ups) ===
Result	Year	Tournament	Surface	Opponent	Score
Win	2004	Wimbledon	Grass	(United States) Serena Williams	6–1, 6–4
Win	2006	US Open	Hard	(Belgium) Justine Henin	6–4, 6–4
Loss	2007	Australian Open	Hard	(United States) Serena Williams	1–6, 2–6
Win	2008	Australian Open	Hard	(Serbia) Ana Ivanovic	7–5, 6–3
Loss	2011	Wimbledon	Grass	(Czech Republic) Petra Kvitová	3–6, 4–6
Loss	2012	Australian Open	Hard	(Belarus) Victoria Azarenka	3–6, 0–6
Win	2012	French Open	Clay	(Italy) Sara Errani	6–3, 6–2
Loss	2013	French Open	Clay	(United States) Serena Williams	4–6, 4–6
Win	2014	French Open (2)	Clay	(Romania) Simona Halep	6–4, 6–7^{(5–7)}, 6–4
Loss	2015	Australian Open	Hard	(United States) Serena Williams	3–6, 6–7^{(5–7)}

== Other significant finals ==
=== Year-end championships ===
==== Singles: 3 (1 title, 2 runner-ups) ====
Result	Year	Tournament	Surface	Opponent	Score
Win	2004	WTA Tour Championships, United States	Hard (i)	(United States) Serena Williams	4–6, 6–2, 6–4
Loss	2007	WTA Tour Championships, Spain	Hard (i)	(Belgium) Justine Henin	7–5, 5–7, 3–6
Loss	2012	WTA Tour Championships, Turkey	Hard (i)	(United States) Serena Williams	4–6, 3–6

=== WTA 1000 tournaments ===
==== Singles: 25 (14 titles, 11 runner-ups) ====
Result	Year	Tournament	Surface	Opponent	Score
Loss	2004	Zurich Open	Hard (i)	(Australia) Alicia Molik	6–4, 2–6, 3–6
Win	2005	Pan Pacific Open	Carpet (i)	(United States) Lindsay Davenport	6–1, 3–6, 7–6^{(7–5)}
Loss	2005	Miami Open	Hard	(Belgium) Kim Clijsters	3–6, 5–7
Win	2006	Indian Wells Open	Hard	(Russia) Elena Dementieva	6–1, 6–2
Loss	2006	Miami Open	Hard	(Russia) Svetlana Kuznetsova	4–6, 3–6
Win	2006	San Diego Open	Hard	(Belgium) Kim Clijsters	7–5, 7–5
Win	2006	Zurich Open	Hard (i)	(Slovakia) Daniela Hantuchová	6–1, 4–6, 6–3
Win	2007	San Diego Open (2)	Hard	(Switzerland) Patty Schnyder	6–2, 3–6, 6–0
Win	2008	Qatar Open	Hard	(Russia) Vera Zvonareva	6–1, 2–6, 6–0
Loss	2009	Canadian Open	Hard	(Russia) Elena Dementieva	4–6, 3–6
Win	2009	Pan Pacific Open (2)	Hard	(Serbia) Jelena Janković	5–2, retired
Loss	2010	Cincinnati Open	Hard	(Belgium) Kim Clijsters	6–2, 6–7^{(4–7)}, 2–6
Loss	2011	Miami Open	Hard	(Belarus) Victoria Azarenka	1–6, 4–6
Win	2011	Italian Open	Clay	(Australia) Samantha Stosur	6–2, 6–4
Win	2011	Cincinnati Open	Hard	(Serbia) Jelena Janković	4–6, 7–6^{(7–3)}, 6–3
Loss	2012	Indian Wells Open	Hard	(Belarus) Victoria Azarenka	2–6, 3–6
Loss	2012	Miami Open	Hard	(Poland) Agnieszka Radwańska	5–7, 4–6
Win	2012	Italian Open (2)	Clay	(China) Li Na	4–6, 6–4, 7–6^{(7–5)}
Loss	2012	China Open	Hard	(Belarus) Victoria Azarenka	3–6, 1–6
Win	2013	Indian Wells Open (2)	Hard	(Denmark) Caroline Wozniacki	6–2, 6–2
Loss	2013	Miami Open	Hard	(United States) Serena Williams	6–4, 3–6, 0–6
Loss	2013	Madrid Open	Clay	(United States) Serena Williams	1–6, 4–6
Win	2014	Madrid Open	Clay	(Romania) Simona Halep	1–6, 6–2, 6–3
Win	2014	China Open	Hard	(Czech Republic) Petra Kvitová	6–4, 2–6, 6–3
Win	2015	Italian Open (3)	Clay	(Spain) Carla Suárez Navarro	4–6, 7–5, 6–1

=== Summer Olympics ===
==== Singles: 1 (silver medal) ====
Result	Year	Tournament	Surface	Opponent	Score
Silver	2012	London Olympics	Grass	(United States) Serena Williams	0–6, 1–6

== WTA Tour finals ==
=== Singles: 59 (36 titles, 23 runner-ups) ===
Legend Grand Slam tournaments (5–5) Olympics (0–1) WTA Finals (1–2) Tier I / Premier Mandatory & Premier 5 / WTA 1000 (14–11) Tier II / Premier / WTA 500 (7–2) Tier III, IV & V / International / WTA 250 (9–2)	Titles by surface Hard (20–17) Grass (3–4) Clay (11–2) Carpet (2–0)	Titles by setting Indoor (9–3) Outdoor (27–20)

Result	W–L	Date	Tournament	Tier	Surface	Opponent	Score
Win	1–0	Sep 2003	Japan Open, Japan	Tier III	Hard	(Hungary) Anikó Kapros	2–6, 6–2, 7–6^{(7–5)}
Win	2–0	Oct 2003	Tournoi de Québec, Canada	Tier III	Carpet (i)	(Venezuela) Milagros Sequera	6–2, retired
Win	3–0	Jun 2004	Birmingham Classic, United Kingdom	Tier III	Grass	(France) Tatiana Golovin	4–6, 6–2, 6–1
Win	4–0	Jul 2004	Wimbledon, United Kingdom	Grand Slam	Grass	(United States) Serena Williams	6–1, 6–4
Win	5–0	Sep 2004	Korea Open, South Korea	Tier IV	Hard	(Poland) Marta Domachowska	6–1, 6–1
Win	6–0	Oct 2004	Japan Open, Japan (2)	Tier III	Hard	(United States) Mashona Washington	6–0, 6–1
Loss	6–1	Oct 2004	Zurich Open, Switzerland	Tier I	Hard (i)	(Australia) Alicia Molik	6–4, 2–6, 3–6
Win	7–1	Nov 2004	WTA Finals, United States	WTA Finals	Hard (i)	(United States) Serena Williams	4–6, 6–2, 6–4
Win	8–1	Feb 2005	Pan Pacific Open, Japan	Tier I	Carpet (i)	(United States) Lindsay Davenport	6–1, 3–6, 7–6^{(7–5)}
Win	9–1	Feb 2005	Qatar Open, Qatar	Tier II	Hard	(Australia) Alicia Molik	4–6, 6–1, 6–4
Loss	9–2	Mar 2005	Miami Open, United States	Tier I	Hard	(Belgium) Kim Clijsters	3–6, 5–7
Win	10–2	Jun 2005	Birmingham Classic, United Kingdom (2)	Tier III	Grass	(Serbia and Montenegro) Jelena Janković	6–2, 4–6, 6–1
Loss	10–3	Feb 2006	Dubai Championships, UAE	Tier II	Hard	(Belgium) Justine Henin	5–7, 2–6
Win	11–3	Mar 2006	Indian Wells Open, United States	Tier I	Hard	(Russia) Elena Dementieva	6–1, 6–2
Loss	11–4	Apr 2006	Miami Open, United States	Tier I	Hard	(Russia) Svetlana Kuznetsova	4–6, 3–6
Win	12–4	Aug 2006	Southern California Open, United States	Tier I	Hard	(Belgium) Kim Clijsters	7–5, 7–5
Win	13–4	Sep 2006	US Open, United States	Grand Slam	Hard	(Belgium) Justine Henin	6–4, 6–4
Win	14–4	Oct 2006	Zurich Open, Switzerland	Tier I	Hard (i)	(Slovakia) Daniela Hantuchová	6–1, 4–6, 6–3
Win	15–4	Oct 2006	Linz Open, Austria	Tier II	Hard (i)	(Russia) Nadia Petrova	7–5, 6–2
Loss	15–5	Jan 2007	Australian Open, Australia	Grand Slam	Hard	(United States) Serena Williams	1–6, 2–6
Loss	15–6	Jun 2007	Birmingham Classic, United Kingdom	Tier III	Grass	(Serbia) Jelena Janković	6–4, 3–6, 5–7
Win	16–6	Aug 2007	Southern California Open, United States (2)	Tier I	Hard	(Switzerland) Patty Schnyder	6–2, 3–6, 6–0
Loss	16–7	Nov 2007	WTA Finals, Spain	WTA Finals	Hard (i)	(Belgium) Justine Henin	7–5, 5–7, 3–6
Win	17–7	Jan 2008	Australian Open, Australia	Grand Slam	Hard	(Serbia) Ana Ivanovic	7–5, 6–3
Win	18–7	Feb 2008	Qatar Open, Qatar (2)	Tier I	Hard	(Russia) Vera Zvonareva	6–1, 2–6, 6–0
Win	19–7	Apr 2008	Amelia Island Championships, United States	Tier II	Clay (green)	(Slovakia) Dominika Cibulková	7–6^{(9–7)}, 6–3
Loss	19–8	Aug 2009	Canadian Open, Canada	Premier 5	Hard	(Russia) Elena Dementieva	4–6, 3–6
Win	20–8	Oct 2009	Pan Pacific Open, Japan (2)	Premier 5	Hard	(Serbia) Jelena Janković	5–2, retired
Win	21–8	Feb 2010	U.S. National Indoor Championships, United States	International	Hard (i)	(Sweden) Sofia Arvidsson	6–2, 6–1
Win	22–8	May 2010	Internationaux de Strasbourg, France	International	Clay	(Germany) Kristina Barrois	7–5, 6–1
Loss	22–9	Jun 2010	Birmingham Classic, United Kingdom	International	Grass	(China) Li Na	5–7, 1–6
Loss	22–10	Aug 2010	Stanford Classic, United States	Premier	Hard	(Belarus) Victoria Azarenka	4–6, 1–6
Loss	22–11	Aug 2010	Cincinnati Open, United States	Premier 5	Hard	(Belgium) Kim Clijsters	6–2, 6–7^{(4–7)}, 2–6
Loss	22–12	Apr 2011	Miami Open, United States	Premier M	Hard	(Belarus) Victoria Azarenka	1–6, 4–6
Win	23–12	May 2011	Italian Open, Italy	Premier 5	Clay	(Australia) Samantha Stosur	6–2, 6–4
Loss	23–13	Jul 2011	Wimbledon, United Kingdom	Grand Slam	Grass	(Czech Republic) Petra Kvitová	3–6, 4–6
Win	24–13	Aug 2011	Cincinnati Open, United States	Premier 5	Hard	(Serbia) Jelena Janković	4–6, 7–6^{(7–3)}, 6–3
Loss	24–14	Jan 2012	Australian Open, Australia	Grand Slam	Hard	(Belarus) Victoria Azarenka	3–6, 0–6
Loss	24–15	Mar 2012	Indian Wells Open, United States	Premier M	Hard	(Belarus) Victoria Azarenka	2–6, 3–6
Loss	24–16	Mar 2012	Miami Open, United States	Premier M	Hard	(Poland) Agnieszka Radwańska	5–7, 4–6
Win	25–16	Apr 2012	Stuttgart Open, Germany	Premier	Clay (i)	(Belarus) Victoria Azarenka	6–1, 6–4
Win	26–16	May 2012	Italian Open, Italy (2)	Premier 5	Clay	(China) Li Na	4–6, 6–4, 7–6^{(7–5)}
Win	27–16	Jun 2012	French Open, France	Grand Slam	Clay	(Italy) Sara Errani	6–3, 6–2
Loss	27–17	Aug 2012	Summer Olympics, United Kingdom	Olympics	Grass	(United States) Serena Williams	0–6, 1–6
Loss	27–18	Oct 2012	China Open, China	Premier M	Hard	(Belarus) Victoria Azarenka	3–6, 1–6
Loss	27–19	Oct 2012	WTA Finals, Turkey	WTA Finals	Hard (i)	(United States) Serena Williams	4–6, 3–6
Win	28–19	Mar 2013	Indian Wells Open, United States (2)	Premier M	Hard	(Denmark) Caroline Wozniacki	6–2, 6–2
Loss	28–20	Mar 2013	Miami Open, United States	Premier M	Hard	(United States) Serena Williams	6–4, 3–6, 0–6
Win	29–20	Apr 2013	Stuttgart Open, Germany (2)	Premier	Clay (i)	(China) Li Na	6–4, 6–3
Loss	29–21	May 2013	Madrid Open, Spain	Premier M	Clay	(United States) Serena Williams	1–6, 4–6
Loss	29–22	Jun 2013	French Open, France	Grand Slam	Clay	(United States) Serena Williams	4–6, 4–6
Win	30–22	Apr 2014	Stuttgart Open, Germany (3)	Premier	Clay (i)	(Serbia) Ana Ivanovic	3–6, 6–4, 6–1
Win	31–22	May 2014	Madrid Open, Spain	Premier M	Clay	(Romania) Simona Halep	1–6, 6–2, 6–3
Win	32–22	Jun 2014	French Open, France (2)	Grand Slam	Clay	(Romania) Simona Halep	6–4, 6–7^{(5–7)}, 6–4
Win	33–22	Oct 2014	China Open, China	Premier M	Hard	(Czech Republic) Petra Kvitová	6–4, 2–6, 6–3
Win	34–22	Jan 2015	Brisbane International, Australia	Premier	Hard	(Serbia) Ana Ivanovic	6–7^{(4–7)}, 6–3, 6–3
Loss	34–23	Jan 2015	Australian Open, Australia	Grand Slam	Hard	(United States) Serena Williams	3–6, 6–7^{(5–7)}
Win	35–23	May 2015	Italian Open, Italy (3)	Premier 5	Clay	(Spain) Carla Suárez Navarro	4–6, 7–5, 6–1
Win	36–23	Oct 2017	Tianjin Open, China	International	Hard	(Belarus) Aryna Sabalenka	7–5, 7–6^{(10–8)}

=== Doubles: 4 (3 titles, 1 runner-up) ===
Legend Tier III, IV & V / International / WTA 250 (3–1)	Titles by surface Hard (2–1) Grass (1–0)

Result	W–L	Date	Tournament	Tier	Surface	Partner	Opponents	Score
Win	1–0	Sep 2003	Japan Open, Japan	Tier III	Hard	(Thailand) Tamarine Tanasugarn	(United States) Ansley Cargill; (United States) Ashley Harkleroad	7–6^{(7–1)}, 6–0
Win	2–0	Oct 2003	Luxembourg Open, Luxembourg	Tier III	Hard (i)	(Thailand) Tamarine Tanasugarn	(Ukraine) Elena Tatarkova; (Germany) Marlene Weingärtner	6–1, 6–4
Loss	2–1	Feb 2004	U.S. National Indoor Championships, United States	Tier III	Hard (i)	(Russia) Vera Zvonareva	(Sweden) Åsa Svensson; (United States) Meilen Tu	4–6, 6–7^{(0–7)}
Win	3–1	Jun 2004	Birmingham Classic, United Kingdom	Tier III	Grass	(Russia) Maria Kirilenko	(Australia) Lisa McShea; (Venezuela) Milagros Sequera	6–2, 6–1

== ITF Circuit finals ==
=== Singles: 6 (4 titles, 2 runner–ups) ===
Legend 50k tournaments 25k tournaments 10k tournaments	Finals by surface Hard (2–2) Clay (1–0) Carpet (1–0)	Finals by setting Outdoor (4–1) Indoor (0–1)

Result	W–L	Date	Tournament	Tier	Surface	Opponent	Score
Win	1–0	Apr 2002	ITF Gunma, Japan	10k	Carpet	(Japan) Aiko Nakamura	6–4, 6–1
Win	2–0	Aug 2002	ITF Vancouver, Canada	25k	Hard	(United States) Laura Granville	0–6, 6–3, 6–1
Win	3–0	Sep 2002	ITF Peachtree City, United States	25k	Hard	(United States) Kelly McCain	6–0, 6–1
Loss	3–1	Oct 2002	ITF Frisco, United States	25k	Hard	(United States) Tara Snyder	6–1, 4–6, 3–6
Loss	3–2	Nov 2002	ITF Pittsburgh, United States	50k	Hard (i)	(Italy) Maria Elena Camerin	6–7^{(4–7)}, 2–6
Win	4–2	May 2003	ITF Sea Island, United States	25k	Clay	(Australia) Christina Wheeler	6–4, 6–3

== Junior Grand Slam tournament finals ==
=== Singles: 2 finals (2 runner-ups) ===
Result	Year	Tournament	Surface	Opponent	Score
Loss	2002	Australian Open	Hard	(Czech Republic) Barbora Strýcová	0–6, 5–7
Loss	2002	Wimbledon	Grass	(Russia) Vera Dushevina	6–4, 1–6, 2–6

== Billie Jean King Cup ==
=== Participations (6) ===
==== Singles: 6 (7–1) ====
Edition	Round	Date	Venue	Against	Surface	Opponent	W/L	Result
2008	WG QF	Feb 2008	Ramat HaSharon, Israel	Israel	Hard	Tzipora Obziler	W	6–0, 6–4
2008	WG QF	Feb 2008	Ramat HaSharon, Israel	Israel	Hard	Shahar Pe'er	W	6–1, 6–1
2011	WG QF	Feb 2011	Moscow, Russia	France	Hard (i)	Virginie Razzano	L	3–6, 4–6
2012	WG QF	Feb 2012	Moscow, Russia	Spain	Hard (i)	Sílvia Soler Espinosa	W	6–2, 6–1
2015	WG QF	Feb 2015	Kraków, Poland	Poland	Hard (i)	Urszula Radwańska	W	6–0, 6–3
2015	WG QF	Feb 2015	Kraków, Poland	Poland	Hard (i)	Agnieszka Radwańska	W	6–1, 7–5
2015	WG F	Nov 2015	Prague, Czech Republic	Czech Republic	Hard (i)	Karolína Plíšková	W	6–3, 6–4
2015	WG F	Nov 2015	Prague, Czech Republic	Czech Republic	Hard (i)	Petra Kvitová	W	3–6, 6–4, 6–2

== WTA Tour career earnings ==
Year	Titles			Earnings ($)	Rank
Year	Grand Slam	WTA	Total	Earnings ($)	Rank
2003	–	2	2	222,005	51
2004	1	4	5	2,506,263	1
2005	–	3	3	1,921,283	5
2006	1	4	5	3,799,501	2
2007	–	1	1	1,758,550	7
2008	1	2	3	1,937,879	7
2009	–	1	1	923,619	15
2010	–	2	2	651,279	31
2011	–	2	2	2,899,148	6
2012	1	2	3	6,508,296	3
2013	–	2	2	3,544,222	4
2014	1	3	4	5,839,357	2
2015	–	2	2	3,949,284	6
2016	–	–	–	n/a	n/a
2017	–	1	1	544,990	66
2018	–	–	–	1,312,643	
2019	–	–	–	279,845	107
Career	5	31	36	38,621,964	3

- Note: Title counts include singles, doubles and mixed doubles titles.

== Career Grand Slam statistics ==
=== Grand Slam tournament seedings ===
Year	Australian Open	French Open	Wimbledon	US Open
2003	Q	Q	WC	–
2004	28th	18th	13th (1)	7th
2005	4th	2nd	2nd	1st
2006	4th	4th	4th	3rd (2)
2007	1st	2nd	2nd	2nd
2008	5th (3)	1st	3rd	A
2009	A	–	24th	29th
2010	14th	12th	16th	14th
2011	14th	7th	5th	3rd
2012	4th	2nd (4)	1st	3rd
2013	2nd	2nd	3rd	A
2014	3rd	7th (5)	5th	5th
2015	2nd	2nd	4th	A
2016	5th	A	A	A
2017	A	A	A	WC
2018	–	28th	24th	22nd
2019	30th	A	–	–
2020	–	A	cancelled	A

- Key: (A) absent; (Q) qualifier; (DNQ) did not qualify; (RT) retired; (NH) Not Held; (–) unseeded; (LL) lucky looser; (PR) protect ranking.

=== Best Grand Slam results details ===
Australian Open
2008 Australian Open (5th seed)
Round	Opponent	Rank	Score
1R	(Croatia) Jelena Kostanić Tošić	102	6–4, 6–3
2R	(United States) Lindsay Davenport	51	6–1, 6–3
3R	(Russia) Elena Vesnina	55	6–3, 6–0
4R	(Russia) Elena Dementieva (11)	11	6–2, 6–0
QF	(Belgium) Justine Henin (1)	1	6–4, 6–0
SF	(Serbia) Jelena Janković (3)	3	6–3, 6–1
W	(Serbia) Ana Ivanovic (4)	4	7–5, 6–3

French Open
2012 French Open (2nd seed)
Round	Opponent	Rank	Score
1R	(Romania) Alexandra Cadanțu	78	6–0, 6–0
2R	(Japan) Ayumi Morita	84	6–1, 6–1
3R	(China) Peng Shuai (28)	30	6–2, 6–1
4R	(Czech Republic) Klára Zakopalová	44	6–4, 6–7^{(5–7)}, 6–2
QF	(Estonia) Kaia Kanepi (23)	23	6–2, 6–3
SF	(Czech Republic) Petra Kvitová (4)	4	6–3, 6–3
W	(Italy) Sara Errani (21)	24	6–3, 6–2
2014 French Open (7th seed)
Round	Opponent	Rank	Score
1R	(Russia) Ksenia Pervak (Q)	156	6–1, 6–2
2R	(Bulgaria) Tsvetana Pironkova	42	7–5, 6–2
3R	(Argentina) Paula Ormaechea	75	6–0, 6–0
4R	(Australia) Samantha Stosur (19)	18	3–6, 6–4, 6–0
QF	(Spain) Garbiñe Muguruza	35	1–6, 7–5, 6–1
SF	(Canada) Eugenie Bouchard (18)	16	4–6, 7–5, 6–2
W	(Romania) Simona Halep (4)	4	6–4, 6–7^{(5–7)}, 6–4

Wimbledon Championships
2004 Wimbledon (13th seed)
Round	Opponent	Rank	Score
1R	(Ukraine) Yuliya Beygelzimer (Q)	119	6–2, 6–1
2R	(United Kingdom) Anne Keothavong (W)	188	6–4, 6–0
3R	(Slovakia) Daniela Hantuchová	38	6–3, 6–1
4R	(United States) Amy Frazier (31)	36	6–4, 7–5
QF	(Japan) Ai Sugiyama (11)	12	5–7, 7–5, 6–1
SF	(United States) Lindsay Davenport (5)	5	2–6, 7–6^{(7–5)}, 6–1
W	(United States) Serena Williams (1)	10	6–1, 6–4

US Open
2006 US Open (3rd seed)
Round	Opponent	Rank	Score
1R	(Netherlands) Michaëlla Krajicek	36	6–3, 6–0
2R	(France) Émilie Loit	67	6–0, 6–1
3R	(Russia) Elena Likhovtseva (32)	35	6–3, 6–2
4R	(China) Li Na (24)	22	6–4, 6–2
QF	(France) Tatiana Golovin (27)	26	7–6^{(7–4)}, 7–6^{(7–0)}
SF	(France) Amélie Mauresmo (1)	1	6–0, 4–6, 6–0
W	(Belgium) Justine Henin-Hardenne (2)	2	6–4, 6–4

== Wins against top 10 players ==
Season	2004	2005	2006	2007	2008	2009	2010	2011	2012	2013	2014	2015	2016	2017	2018	2019	Total
Wins	7	8	14	7	4	5	2	6	14	7	10	9	0	1	3	1	98

No.	Player	Rk	Event	Surface	Rd	Score	Rk	Years	Ref
1.	(Russia) Elena Dementieva	10	Italian Open, Italy	Clay	2R	6–1, 6–4		2004	
2.	(United States) Lindsay Davenport	5	Wimbledon, United Kingdom	Grass	SF	2–6, 7–6^{(7–5)}, 6–1		2004	
3.	(United States) Serena Williams	10	Wimbledon, United Kingdom	Grass	F	6–1, 6–4		2004	
4.	(Russia) Elena Dementieva	5	Zurich Open, Switzerland	Hard (i)	SF	4–6, 6–2, 6–3		2004	
5.	(Russia) Svetlana Kuznetsova	4	WTA Tour Championships, United States	Hard (i)	RR	6–1, 6–4		2004	
6.	(Russia) Anastasia Myskina	3	WTA Tour Championships, United States	Hard (i)	SF	2–6, 6–2, 6–2		2004	
7.	(United States) Serena Williams	8	WTA Tour Championships, United States	Hard (i)	F	4–6, 6–2, 6–4		2004	
8.	(Russia) Svetlana Kuznetsova	5	Australian Open, Australia	Hard	QF	4–6, 6–2, 6–2		2005	
9.	(United States) Lindsay Davenport	1	Pan Pacific Open, Japan	Hard	F	6–1, 3–6, 7–6^{(7–5)}		2005	
10.	(Australia) Alicia Molik	9	Qatar Open, Qatar	Hard	F	4–6, 6–1, 6–4		2005	
11.	(United States) Venus Williams	9	Miami Open, United States	Hard	SF	6–4, 6–3		2005	
12.	(Russia) Nadia Petrova	8	Wimbledon, United Kingdom	Grass	QF	7–6^{(8–6)}, 6–3		2005	
13.	(Russia) Nadia Petrova	9	US Open, United States	Hard	QF	7–5, 4–6, 6–4		2005	
14.	(United States) Lindsay Davenport	1	WTA Tour Championships, United States	Hard (i)	RR	6–3, 5–7, 6–4		2005	
15.	(Switzerland) Patty Schnyder	8	WTA Tour Championships, United States	Hard (i)	RR	6–1, 3–6, 6–2		2005	
16.	(Russia) Nadia Petrova	7	Australian Open, Australia	Hard	QF	7–6^{(8–6)}, 6–4		2006	
17.	(United States) Lindsay Davenport	3	Dubai Championships, UAE	Hard	SF	3–6, 6–1, 6–3		2006	
18.	(Russia) Elena Dementieva	8	Indian Wells Open, United States	Hard	F	6–1, 6–2		2006	
19.	(Russia) Elena Dementieva	8	Wimbledon, United Kingdom	Grass	QF	6–1, 6–4		2006	
20.	(France) Mary Pierce	9	Southern California Open, United States	Hard	QF	6–2, 6–3		2006	
21.	(Switzerland) Patty Schnyder	8	Southern California Open, United States	Hard	SF	7–5, 6–4		2006	
22.	(Belgium) Kim Clijsters	2	Southern California Open, United States	Hard	F	7–5, 7–5		2006	
23.	(France) Amélie Mauresmo	1	US Open, United States	Hard	SF	6–0, 4–6, 6–0		2006	
24.	(Belgium) Justine Henin	2	US Open, United States	Hard	F	6–4, 6–4		2006	
25.	(Switzerland) Patty Schnyder	9	Linz Open, Austria	Hard (i)	SF	7–5, 7–5		2006	
26.	(Russia) Nadia Petrova	5	Linz Open, Austria	Hard (i)	F	7–5, 6–2		2006	
27.	(Russia) Svetlana Kuznetsova	4	WTA Tour Championships, Spain	Hard (i)	RR	6–1, 6–4		2006	
28.	(Belgium) Kim Clijsters	6	WTA Tour Championships, Spain	Hard (i)	RR	6–4, 6–4		2006	
29.	(Russia) Elena Dementieva	4	WTA Tour Championships, Spain	Hard (i)	RR	6–1, 6–4		2006	
30.	(Belgium) Kim Clijsters	5	Australian Open, Australia	Hard	SF	6–4, 6–2		2007	
31.	(Russia) Anna Chakvetadze	9	French Open, France	Clay	QF	6–3, 6–4		2007	
32.	(Russia) Anna Chakvetadze	6	San Diego, United States	Hard	SF	6–3, 6–2		2007	
33.	(Slovakia) Daniela Hantuchová	9	WTA Tour Championships, Spain	Hard (i)	RR	6–4, 7–5		2007	
34.	(Russia) Svetlana Kuznetsova	2	WTA Tour Championships, Spain	Hard (i)	RR	5–7, 6–2, 6–2		2007	
35.	(Serbia) Ana Ivanovic	4	WTA Tour Championships, Spain	Hard (i)	RR	6–1, 6–2		2007	
36.	(Russia) Anna Chakvetadze	7	WTA Tour Championships, Spain	Hard (i)	SF	6–2, 6–2		2007	
37.	(Belgium) Justine Henin	1	Australian Open, Australia	Hard	QF	6–4, 6–0		2008	
38.	(Serbia) Jelena Janković	4	Australian Open, Australia	Hard	SF	6–3, 6–1		2008	
39.	(Serbia) Ana Ivanovic	3	Australian Open, Australia	Hard	F	7–5, 6–3		2008	
40.	(Slovakia) Daniela Hantuchová	8	Indian Wells Open, United States	Hard	QF	7–6^{(7–2)}, 6–1		2008	
41.	(Russia) Nadia Petrova	10	Silicon Valley Classic, United States	Hard	2R	6–1, 6–2		2009	
42.	(Belarus) Victoria Azarenka	9	LA Championships, United States	Hard	2R	6–7^{(4–7)}, 6–4, 6–2		2009	
43.	(Russia) Vera Zvonareva	7	Canadian Open, Canada	Hard	3R	6–2, 7–6^{(7–3)}		2009	
44.	(Serbia) Jelena Janković	8	Pan Pacific Open, Japan	Hard	F	5–2, retired		2009	
45.	(Belarus) Victoria Azarenka	9	China Open, China	Hard	2R	6–3, 6–7^{(5–7)}, 7–5		2009	
46.	(Russia) Elena Dementieva	6	Silicon Valley Classic, United States	Hard	QF	6–4, 2–6, 6–3		2010	
47.	(Poland) Agnieszka Radwańska	9	Cincinnati Open, United States	Hard	3R	6–2, 6–3		2010	
48.	(Australia) Samantha Stosur	5	Miami Open, United States	Hard	4R	6–4, 6–1		2011	
49.	(Belarus) Victoria Azarenka	4	Italian Open, Italy	Clay	QF	4–6, 3–0, retired		2011	
50.	(Denmark) Caroline Wozniacki	1	Italian Open, Italy	Clay	SF	7–5, 6–3		2011	
51.	(Australia) Samantha Stosur	7	Italian Open, Italy	Clay	F	6–2, 6–4		2011	
52.	(Australia) Samantha Stosur	10	Cincinnati Open, United States	Hard	QF	6–3, 6–2		2011	
53.	(Russia) Vera Zvonareva	2	Cincinnati Open, United States	Hard	SF	2–6, 6–3, 6–3		2011	
54.	(Czech Republic) Petra Kvitová	2	Australian Open, Australia	Hard	SF	6–2, 3–6, 6–4		2012	
55.	(China) Li Na	8	Miami Open, United States	Hard	QF	6–3, 6–0		2012	
56.	(Denmark) Caroline Wozniacki	6	Miami Open, United States	Hard	SF	4–6, 6–2, 6–4		2012	
57.	(Australia) Samantha Stosur	5	Stuttgart Open, Germany	Clay (i)	QF	6–7^{(5–7)}, 7–6^{(7–5)}, 7–5		2012	
58.	(Czech Republic) Petra Kvitová	3	Stuttgart Open, Germany	Clay (i)	SF	6–4, 7–6^{(7–3)}		2012	
59.	(Belarus) Victoria Azarenka	1	Stuttgart Open, Germany	Clay (i)	F	6–1, 6–4		2012	
60.	(China) Li Na	9	Italian Open, Italy	Clay	F	4–6, 6–4, 7–6^{(7–5)}		2012	
61.	(Czech Republic) Petra Kvitová	4	French Open, France	Clay	SF	6–3, 6–3		2012	
62.	(Germany) Angelique Kerber	6	China Open, China	Hard	QF	6–0, 3–0, retired		2012	
63.	(China) Li Na	8	China Open, China	Hard	SF	6–4, 6–0		2012	
64.	(Italy) Sara Errani	7	WTA Tour Championships, Turkey	Hard (i)	RR	6–3, 6–2		2012	
65.	(Poland) Agnieszka Radwańska	4	WTA Tour Championships, Turkey	Hard (i)	RR	5–7, 7–5, 7–5		2012	
66.	(Australia) Samantha Stosur	9	WTA Tour Championships, Turkey	Hard (i)	RR	6–0, 6–3		2012	
67.	(Belarus) Victoria Azarenka	1	WTA Tour Championships, Turkey	Hard (i)	SF	6–4, 6–2		2012	
68.	(Australia) Samantha Stosur	9	Qatar Open, Qatar	Hard	QF	6–2, 6–4		2013	
69.	(Italy) Sara Errani	8	Indian Wells, United States	Hard	QF	7–6^{(8–6)}, 6–2		2013	
70.	(Denmark) Caroline Wozniacki	10	Indian Wells, United States	Hard	F	6–2, 6–2		2013	
71.	(Italy) Sara Errani	7	Miami Open, United States	Hard	QF	7–5, 7–5		2013	
72.	(Germany) Angelique Kerber	6	Stuttgart Open, Germany	Clay (i)	SF	6–3, 2–6, 7–5		2013	
73.	(China) Li Na	5	Stuttgart Open, Germany	Clay (i)	F	6–4, 6–3		2013	
74.	(Belarus) Victoria Azarenka	3	French Open, France	Clay	SF	6–1, 2–6, 6–4		2013	
75.	(Czech Republic) Petra Kvitová	8	Miami Open, United States	Hard	QF	7–5, 6–1		2014	
76.	(Poland) Agnieszka Radwańska	3	Stuttgart Open, Germany	Clay (i)	QF	6–4, 6–3		2014	
77.	(China) Li Na	2	Madrid Open, Spain	Clay	QF	2–6, 7–6^{(7–5)}, 6–3		2014	
78.	(Poland) Agnieszka Radwańska	3	Madrid Open, Spain	Clay	SF	6–1, 6–4		2014	
79.	(Romania) Simona Halep	5	Madrid Open, Spain	Clay	F	1–6, 6–2, 6–3		2014	
80.	(Romania) Simona Halep	4	French Open, France	Clay	F	6–4, 6–7^{(5–7)}, 6–4		2014	
81.	(Romania) Simona Halep	2	Cincinnati Open, United States	Hard	QF	3–6, 6–4, 6–4		2014	
82.	(Serbia) Ana Ivanovic	9	China Open, China	Hard	SF	6–0, 6–4		2014	
83.	(Czech Republic) Petra Kvitová	3	China Open, China	Hard	F	6–4, 2–6, 6–3		2014	
84.	(Poland) Agnieszka Radwańska	6	WTA Tour Championships, Singapore	Hard (i)	RR	7–5, 6–7^{(4–7)}, 6–2		2014	
85.	(Serbia) Ana Ivanovic	5	Brisbane International, Australia	Hard	F	6–7^{(4–7)}, 6–3, 6–3		2015	
86.	(Canada) Eugenie Bouchard	7	Australian Open, Australia	Hard	QF	6–3, 6–2		2015	
87.	(Poland) Agnieszka Radwańska	8	Fed Cup, Kraków, Poland	Hard (i)	QF	6–1, 7–5		2015	
88.	(Denmark) Caroline Wozniacki	5	Madrid Open, Spain	Clay	QF	6–1, 3–6, 6–3		2015	
89.	(Spain) Carla Suárez Navarro	10	Italian Open, Italy	Clay	F	4–6, 7–5, 6–1		2015	
90.	(Poland) Agnieszka Radwańska	6	WTA Tour Championships, Singapore	Hard (i)	RR	4–6, 6–3, 6–4		2015	
91.	(Romania) Simona Halep	2	WTA Tour Championships, Singapore	Hard (i)	RR	6–4, 6–4		2015	
92.	(Italy) Flavia Pennetta	8	WTA Tour Championships, Singapore	Hard (i)	RR	7–5, 6–1		2015	
93.	(Czech Republic) Petra Kvitová	6	Fed Cup, Prague, Czech Republic	Hard (i)	F	3–6, 6–4, 6–2		2015	
94.	(Romania) Simona Halep	2	US Open, United States	Hard	1R	6–4, 4–6, 6–3		2017	
95.	(Latvia) Jeļena Ostapenko	6	Italian Open, Italy	Clay	QF	6–7^{(6–8)}, 6–4, 7–5		2018	
96.	(Czech Republic) Karolína Plíšková	6	French Open, France	Clay	3R	6–2, 6–1		2018	
97.	(Latvia) Jeļena Ostapenko	10	US Open, United States	Hard	3R	6–3, 6–2		2018	
98.	(Denmark) Caroline Wozniacki	3	Australian Open, Australia	Hard	3R	6–4, 4–6, 6–3		2019	

- Key: (Rk) first use, opponent rank; (Rd) round; (Rk) 2nd use, player rank; (Ref) reference; (F) final; (SF) semifinal; (QF) quarterfinal; (#R) rounds 4, 3, 2, 1; (RR) round-robin stage; (Q#) qualifying rounds or stages (3), 2, 1.

== Double bagel matches (6–0, 6–0) ==
Back-to-back doubles bagels at the 2013 & 2014 Australian Open, making Sharapova the first to complete such a feat since Wendy Turnbull at the 1985 Australian Open.

Result	Year	W–L	Tournament	Tier	Surface	Opponent	vsRank	Round	Rank
Win	2002		ITF Peachtree City, United States	25k	Hard	(Colombia) Catalina Castaño		1R	
Loss	2005		Indian Wells Open, United States	Tier I	Hard	(United States) Lindsay Davenport		SF	
Win	2008		Charleston Open, United States	Tier I	Clay (g)	(United States) Bathenie Mattek-Sands		2R	
Win	2010		US Open, United States	Grand Slam	Hard	(United States) Beatrice Capra		3R	
Win	2012		French Open, France	Grand Slam	Clay	(Romania) Alexandra Cadanțu		1R	
Win	2013		Australian Open, Australia	Grand Slam	Hard	(Russia) Olga Puchkova		1R	
Win	2013		Australian Open, Australia	Grand Slam	Hard	(Japan) Misaki Doi		2R	
Win	2014		French Open, France	Grand Slam	Clay	(Argentina) Paula Ormaechea		3R	
Win	2019		Australian Open, Australia	Grand Slam	Hard	(United Kingdom) Harriet Dart		1R	

== Longest winning streaks ==
=== 19 match win streak (2006) ===
#	Tournament	Category	Start date	Surface	Rd	Opponent	Rank	Score
–	LA Championships	Tier II	August 7	Hard	SF	(Russia) Elena Dementieva	6	5–7, 2–6
1	US Open	Grand Slam	28 August	Hard	1R	(Netherlands) Michaëlla Krajicek	36	6–3, 6–0
2	US Open	Grand Slam	28 August	Hard	2R	(France) Émilie Loit	67	6–0, 6–1
3	US Open	Grand Slam	28 August	Hard	3R	(Russia) Elena Likhovtseva	35	6–3, 6–2
4	US Open	Grand Slam	28 August	Hard	4R	(China) Li Na	22	6–4, 6–2
5	US Open	Grand Slam	28 August	Hard	QF	(France) Tatiana Golovin	26	7–6^{(7–4)}, 7–6^{(7–0)}
6	US Open	Grand Slam	28 August	Hard	SF	(France) Amélie Mauresmo	1	6–0, 4–6, 6–0
7	US Open	Grand Slam	28 August	Hard	F	(Belgium) Justine Henin	2	6–4, 6–4
8	Kremlin Cup	Tier I	9 October	Hard (i)	2R	(Russia) Ekaterina Bychkova	94	6–4, 7–5
–	Kremlin Cup	Tier I	9 October	Hard (i)	QF	(Russia) Anna Chakvetadze	24	w/o
9	Zurich Open	Tier I	16 October	Hard (i)	2R	(Israel) Shahar Pe'er	23	6–4, 7–6^{(7–4)}
10	Zurich Open	Tier I	16 October	Hard (i)	QF	(Switzerland) Timea Bacsinszky	174	6–4, 6–3
11	Zurich Open	Tier I	16 October	Hard (i)	SF	(Slovenia) Katarina Srebotnik	24	7–6^{(7–3)}, 6–2
12	Zurich Open	Tier I	16 October	Hard (i)	F	(Slovakia) Daniela Hantuchová	22	6–1, 4–6, 6–3
13	Linz Open	Tier II	23 October	Hard (i)	2R	(Greece) Eleni Daniilidou	41	7–5, 6–1
14	Linz Open	Tier II	23 October	Hard (i)	QF	(Serbia) Ana Ivanovic	15	7–6^{(7–3)}, 7–5
15	Linz Open	Tier II	23 October	Hard (i)	SF	(Switzerland) Patty Schnyder	9	7–5, 7–5
16	Linz Open	Tier II	23 October	Hard (i)	F	(Russia) Nadia Petrova	5	7–5, 6–2
17	WTA Tour Championships	Finals	6 November	Hard	RR	(Russia) Svetlana Kuznetsova	4	6–1, 6–4
18	WTA Tour Championships	Finals	6 November	Hard	RR	(Belgium) Kim Clijsters	6	6–4, 6–4
19	WTA Tour Championships	Finals	6 November	Hard	RR	(Russia) Elena Dementieva	8	6–1, 6–4
–	WTA Tour Championships	Finals	6 November	Hard	SF	(Belgium) Justine Henin	3	2–6, 6–7^{(5–7)}

== See also ==
- List of Grand Slam Women's Singles champions
- WTA Tour records

== Notes ==
Sporting positions
Preceded by Lindsay Davenport; Lindsay Davenport; Justine Henin; Justine Henin; Victoria Azarenka	World No. 1; 22 August 2005 – 28 August 2005; 12 September 2005 – 23 October 2005; 29 January 2007 – 18 March 2007; 19 May 2008 – 8 June 2008; 11 June 2012 – 8 July 2012	Succeeded by Lindsay Davenport; Lindsay Davenport; Justine Henin: Ana Ivanovic; Victoria Azarenka
Preceded by Ana Ivanovic	US Open Series Champion; 2007	Succeeded by Dinara Safina
Awards
Preceded by Svetlana Kuznetsova	WTA Newcomer of the Year; 2003	Succeeded by Tatiana Golovin
Preceded by Nadia Petrova	WTA Most Improved Player; 2004	Succeeded by Ana Ivanovic
Preceded by Justine Henin	WTA Player of the Year; 2004	Succeeded by Kim Clijsters
Preceded by Serena Williams; Venus Williams; Serena Williams; Serena Williams	ESPY Best Female Tennis Player; 2005; 2007–2008; 2012; 2014	Succeeded by Venus Williams; Serena Williams; Serena Williams; Serena Williams
Preceded by N/A	ESPY Best International Female Athlete; 2007	Succeeded by Lorena Ochoa
Preceded by Elena Dementieva	WTA Fan Favorite Singles Player of the Year; 2010	Succeeded by Agnieszka Radwańska
Preceded by Ana Ivanovic	WTA Humanitarian of the Year; 2010	Incumbent
Olympic Games
Preceded by Andrei Kirilenko	Flagbearer for Russia; London 2012	Succeeded by Sergey Tetyukhin
