= 2002 AIG Japan Open Tennis Championships – Women's doubles =

Women's doubles
- 2002 AIG Japan Open Tennis Championships

Final
- Champions: (Japan) Shinobu Asagoe (Japan) Nana Miyagi
- Runners-up: (Russia) Svetlana Kuznetsova (Spain) Arantxa Sánchez Vicario
- Score: 6–4, 4–6, 6–4

Details
- Draw: 16
- Seeds: 4

Events
Singles	men	women
Doubles	men	women
← 2001 ·	Japan Open	· 2003 →

Liezel Huber and Rachel McQuillan were the defending champions, but none of them competed this year. Huber played in the Kremlin Cup at the same week.

Shinobu Asagoe and Nana Miyagi won the title by defeating Svetlana Kuznetsova and Arantxa Sánchez Vicario 6–4, 4–6, 6–4 in the final. It was the 2nd title for Asagoe and the 19th title for Miyagi in their respective doubles careers.

== Seeds ==
1. (Russia) Svetlana Kuznetsova / (Spain) Arantxa Sánchez Vicario (final)
2. (Japan) Shinobu Asagoe / (Japan) Nana Miyagi (champions)
3. (Australia) Evie Dominikovic / (Australia) Trudi Musgrave (first round)
4. (Japan) Rika Hiraki / (Paraguay) Rossana Neffa-de los Ríos (semifinals)

== Draw ==
=== Key ===
- Q = Qualifier
- WC = Wild card
- LL = Lucky loser
- Alt = Alternate
- ITF = ITF entry
- PR = Protected ranking
- SR = Special ranking
- SE = Special exempt
- JE = Junior exempt
- JR = Junior Accelerator Programme entrant
- CO = College Accelerator Programme entrant
- NG = Next Gen Accelerator Program entrant
- w/o = Walkover
- r = Retired
- d = Defaulted

=== Draw ===
First round
1	(Russia) S Kuznetsova (Spain) A Sánchez Vicario	6	6
(Japan) A Morigami (Japan) S Obata	2	4
(Croatia) J Kostanić (Republic of Ireland) K Liggan	3	5
(United States) A Augustus (Canada) R Kolbovic	6	7
3	(Australia) E Dominikovic (Australia) T Musgrave	3	4
(France) V Razzano (Croatia) S Talaja	6	6
WC	(Russia) M Kirilenko (Russia) M Sharapova	4	7^{7}	3
(Latvia) L Dekmeijere (Sweden) H Ejeson	6	6^{4}	6
Q	(Japan) M Arai (Japan) S Okamoto	6	3	4
(Spain) M Marrero (Australia) A Molik	3	6	6
(Japan) A Takase (Japan) R Tezuka	6^{4}	3
4	(Japan) R Hiraki (Paraguay) R Neffa-de los Ríos	7^{7}	6
(Australia) L McShea (United States) K Schlukebir	7^{7}	4	6
(United States) A Cargill (Canada) V Webb	6^{4}	6	4
(Japan) M Saeki (Japan) Y Yoshida	5	6^{3}
2	(Japan) S Asagoe (Japan) N Miyagi	7	7^{7}

Quarterfinals
1	(Russia) S Kuznetsova (Spain) A Sánchez Vicario	6	3	6
(United States) A Augustus (Canada) R Kolbovic	4	6	3
(France) V Razzano (Croatia) S Talaja	6	6
(Latvia) L Dekmeijere (Sweden) H Ejeson	2	1
(Spain) M Marrero (Australia) A Molik	3	4
4	(Japan) R Hiraki (Paraguay) R Neffa-de los Ríos	6	6
(Australia) L McShea (United States) K Schlukebir	6^{3}	3
2	(Japan) S Asagoe (Japan) N Miyagi	7^{7}	6

Semifinals
1	(Russia) S Kuznetsova (Spain) A Sánchez Vicario	6	6
(France) V Razzano (Croatia) S Talaja	4	1
4	(Japan) R Hiraki (Paraguay) R Neffa-de los Ríos	6^{5}	6^{5}
2	(Japan) S Asagoe (Japan) N Miyagi	7^{7}	7^{7}

Final
1	(Russia) S Kuznetsova (Spain) A Sánchez Vicario	4	6	4
2	(Japan) S Asagoe (Japan) N Miyagi	6	4	6
