= 2003 AIG Japan Open Tennis Championships =

- Date: September 29 – October 5
- Edition: 30th
- Surface: Hard / outdoors
- Location: Tokyo, Japan
- Venue: Ariake Coliseum

Champions

Men's singles
- (Germany) Rainer Schüttler

Women's singles
- (Russia) Maria Sharapova

Men's doubles
- (United States) Justin Gimelstob / (Germany) Nicolas Kiefer

Women's doubles
- (Russia) Maria Sharapova / (Thailand) Tamarine Tanasugarn
← 2002 ·	Japan Open	· 2004 →

The 2003 AIG Japan Open Tennis Championships was a combined men's and women's tennis tournament played on outdoor hard courts at the Ariake Coliseum in Tokyo in Japan that was part of the International Series Gold of the 2003 ATP Tour and of Tier III of the 2003 WTA Tour. The tournament ran from September 29 through October 5, 2003. Rainer Schüttler and Maria Sharapova won the singles title.

== Finals ==
=== Men's singles ===
(Germany) Rainer Schüttler defeated (France) Sébastien Grosjean 7–6^{(7–5)}, 6–2

- It was Schüttler's 1st title of the year and the 4th of his career.

=== Women's singles ===
(Russia) Maria Sharapova defeated (Hungary) Anikó Kapros 2–6, 6–2, 7–6^{(7–5)}

- It was the 1st title of Sharapova's career.

=== Men's doubles ===
(United States) Justin Gimelstob / (Germany) Nicolas Kiefer defeated (United States) Scott Humphries / (The Bahamas) Mark Merklein 6–7^{(6–8)}, 6–3, 7–6^{(7–4)}

- It was Gimelstob's 1st title of the year and the 10th of his career. It was Kiefer's 1st title of the year and the 3rd of his career.

=== Women's doubles ===
(Russia) Maria Sharapova / (Thailand) Tamarine Tanasugarn defeated (United States) Ansley Cargill / (United States) Ashley Harkleroad 7–6^{(7–1)}, 6–0

- It was Sharapova's 1st title of the year and the 1st of her career. It was Tanasugarn's 2nd title of the year and the 5th of her career.
