= 2003 AIG Japan Open Tennis Championships – Women's singles =

Women's singles
- 2003 AIG Japan Open Tennis Championships

Final
- Champion: (Russia) Maria Sharapova
- Runner-up: (Hungary) Anikó Kapros
- Score: 2–6, 6–2, 7–6^{(7–5)}

Details
- Draw: 30 (4 Q / 2 WC / 2 LL )
- Seeds: 8

Events
Singles	men	women
Doubles	men	women
← 2002 ·	Japan Open	· 2004 →

Jill Craybas was the defending champion, but lost in quarterfinals to Arantxa Parra Santonja.

Maria Sharapova won the title by defeating Anikó Kapros 2–6, 6–2, 7–6^{(7–5)} in the final.

== Seeds ==
The first two seeds received a bye into the second round.

1. (Japan) Ai Sugiyama (quarterfinals)
2. (Thailand) Tamarine Tanasugarn (second round)
3. (Slovenia) Katarina Srebotnik (second round)
4. (Japan) Shinobu Asagoe (second round)
5. (Russia) Maria Sharapova (champion)
6. (United States) Ashley Harkleroad (second round)
7. (Japan) Saori Obata (first round)
8. (Switzerland) Emmanuelle Gagliardi (second round)

== Draw ==
=== Key ===
- Q = Qualifier
- WC = Wild card
- LL = Lucky loser
- Alt = Alternate
- ITF = ITF entry
- PR = Protected ranking
- SR = Special ranking
- SE = Special exempt
- JE = Junior exempt
- JR = Junior Accelerator Programme entrant
- CO = College Accelerator Programme entrant
- NG = Next Gen Accelerator Program entrant
- w/o = Walkover
- r = Retired
- d = Defaulted

=== Finals ===
Semifinals
(Hungary) Anikó Kapros	6	6
(Spain) Arantxa Parra Santonja	1	2
5	(Russia) Maria Sharapova	6	7
(China) Zheng Jie	3	5

Final
(Hungary) Anikó Kapros	6	2	6^{5}
5	(Russia) Maria Sharapova	2	6	7^{7}

=== Top half ===
First round
(Indonesia) A Widjaja	4	5
(Japan) Y Yoshida	6	7
Q	(China) T Sun	4	2
(Hungary) A Kapros	6	6
Q	(United States) A Spears	1	6	4
8	(Switzerland) E Gagliardi	6	2	6
4	(Japan) S Asagoe	6	6
Q	(China) T Li	1	1
(Italy) An Serra Zanetti	1	2
(Spain) A Parra Santonja	6	6
(United States) A Cargill	3	2
WC	(Japan) R Fujiwara	6	6
(United States) J Craybas	6	6
7	(Japan) S Obata	4	2

Second round
1	(Japan) A Sugiyama	6	3	7^{7}
(Japan) Y Yoshida	3	6	6^{0}
(Hungary) A Kapros	6	6
8	(Switzerland) E Gagliardi	0	2
4	(Japan) S Asagoe	7	4	3
(Spain) A Parra Santonja	5	6	6
WC	(Japan) R Fujiwara	6	4	2
(United States) J Craybas	4	6	6

Quarterfinals
1	(Japan) A Sugiyama	4	2^{r}
(Hungary) A Kapros	6	3
(Spain) A Parra Santonja	3	6	6
(United States) J Craybas	6	4	2

Semifinals
(Hungary) A Kapros	6	6
(Spain) A Parra Santonja	1	2

=== Bottom half ===
First round
5	(Russia) M Sharapova	6	6
LL	(South Korea) J-h Kim	2	0
(Japan) A Morigami	6	6
(Russia) M Kirilenko	1	2
(Slovakia) M Suchá	1	5
(Luxembourg) C Schaul	6	7
(Australia) E Dominikovic	3	3
3	(Slovenia) K Srebotnik	6	6
6	(United States) A Harkleroad	6	6
WC	(Japan) M Ozaki	0	0
LL	(China) Z Yan	6	6
Q	(Japan) M Saeki	2	4
(China) J Zheng	6	7
(Croatia) S Talaja	4	5

Second round
5	(Russia) M Sharapova	6	6
(Japan) A Morigami	1	3
(Luxembourg) C Schaul	6	2	7^{7}
3	(Slovenia) K Srebotnik	3	6	6^{5}
6	(United States) A Harkleroad	6^{5}	4
LL	(China) Z Yan	7^{7}	6
(China) J Zheng	1	6	6
2	(Thailand) T Tanasugarn	6	2	4

Quarterfinals
5	(Russia) M Sharapova	7	7^{7}
(Luxembourg) C Schaul	5	6^{1}
LL	(China) Z Yan	6^{3}	3
(China) J Zheng	7^{7}	6

Semifinals
5	(Russia) M Sharapova	6	7
(China) J Zheng	3	5
