= 2003 AIG Japan Open Tennis Championships – Men's singles =

Men's singles
- 2003 AIG Japan Open Tennis Championships

Final
- Champion: (Germany) Rainer Schüttler
- Runner-up: (France) Sébastien Grosjean
- Score: 7–6^{(7–5)}, 6–2

Details
- Draw: 48 (6 Q / 4 WC )
- Seeds: 16

Events
Singles	men	women
Doubles	men	women
- Japan Open

Kenneth Carlsen was the defending champion but lost in the third round to Hyung-Taik Lee.

Rainer Schüttler won in the final 7–6^{(7–5)}, 6–2 against Sébastien Grosjean.

== Seeds ==
All sixteen seeds received a bye to the second round.

1. (Germany) Rainer Schüttler (champion)
2. (France) Sébastien Grosjean (final)
3. (Thailand) Paradorn Srichaphan (semifinals)
4. (Czech Republic) Jiří Novák (third round)
5. (Australia) Mark Philippoussis (quarterfinals)
6. (Germany) Nicolas Kiefer (third round)
7. (South Korea) Hyung-Taik Lee (quarterfinals)
8. (United States) Jan-Michael Gambill (quarterfinals)
9. (Denmark) Kenneth Carlsen (third round)
10. (Croatia) Mario Ančić (third round)
11. n/a
12. (Netherlands) John van Lottum (second round)
13. (United States) Brian Vahaly (second round)
14. (South Africa) Wesley Moodie (second round)
15. (Germany) Lars Burgsmüller (second round)
16. (France) Grégory Carraz (second round)

== Draw ==
Key

- Q = Qualifier
- WC = Wild card
- LL = Lucky loser
- Alt = Alternate
- ITF = ITF entry
- PR = Protected ranking
- SR = Special ranking
- SE = Special exempt
- JE = Junior exempt
- JR = Junior Accelerator Programme entrant
- CO = College Accelerator Programme entrant
- NG = Next Gen Accelerator Program entrant
- w/o = Walkover
- r = Retired
- d = Defaulted

=== Finals ===
Semifinals
1	(Germany) Rainer Schüttler	6	6
(France) Cyril Saulnier	3	2
3	(Thailand) Paradorn Srichaphan	6	3	4
2	(France) Sébastien Grosjean	4	6	6

Final
1	(Germany) Rainer Schüttler	7^{7}	6
2	(France) Sébastien Grosjean	6^{5}	2

=== Top half ===
==== Section 1 ====
First round
WC	(Japan) S Iwabuchi	7^{7}	6
(United States) C Mamiit	6^{4}	2
(United States) R Kendrick	7^{7}	6
(Australia) W Arthurs	6^{3}	4
Q	(Czech Republic) J Vacek	3	6^{4}
(Australia) S Draper	6	7^{7}
(Switzerland) I Heuberger	2	6^{1}
(United States) A Bogomolov Jr.	6	7^{7}

Second round
1	(Germany) R Schüttler	6	6
WC	(Japan) S Iwabuchi	0	4
(United States) R Kendrick	6	3	6
13	(United States) B Vahaly	2	6	4
LL	(United States) E Taino	2	6^{5}
(Australia) S Draper	6	7^{7}
(United States) A Bogomolov Jr.	5	6^{7}
6	(Germany) N Kiefer	7	7^{9}

Third round
1	(Germany) R Schüttler	6	6
(United States) R Kendrick	3	2
(Australia) S Draper	7	6
6	(Germany) N Kiefer	5	2

Quarterfinals
1	(Germany) R Schüttler	6	6
(Australia) S Draper	3	3

==== Section 2 ====
First round
Q	(Germany) B Phau	6^{1}	7^{7}	7^{7}
(United States) J Salzenstein	7^{7}	6^{4}	6^{3}
(United States) J Gimelstob	6^{5}	6	1
(France) C Saulnier	7^{7}	3	6
(Austria) W Eschauer	0	4
Q	(Japan) T Iwami	6	6
(Argentina) F Browne	6	6
WC	(Japan) T Terachi	3	4

Second round
4	(Czech Republic) J Novák	7^{7}	6
Q	(Germany) B Phau	6^{2}	2
(France) C Saulnier	7^{8}	7^{7}
15	(Germany) L Burgsmüller	6^{6}	6^{4}
10	(Croatia) M Ančić	6	7
Q	(Japan) T Iwami	2	5
(Argentina) F Browne	4	3
5	(Australia) M Philippoussis	6	6

Third round
4	(Czech Republic) J Novák	6	5	4
(France) C Saulnier	4	7	6
10	(Croatia) M Ančić	4	5
5	(Australia) M Philippoussis	6	7

Quarterfinals
(France) C Saulnier	5
5	(Australia) M Philippoussis	2^{r}

=== Bottom half ===
==== Section 3 ====
First round
Q	(United States) G Weiner	4	2
(Spain) F Verdasco	6	6
(Argentina) M Vassallo Argüello	0	3
WC	(Japan) G Motomura	6	6
(Germany) A Waske	6^{5}	3
WC	(Japan) T Suzuki	7^{7}	6
(Belgium) D Norman	7	6
Q	(Switzerland) G Bastl	5	4

Second round
7	(South Korea) H-T Lee	6	6^{3}	6
(Spain) F Verdasco	3	7^{7}	3
WC	(Japan) G Motomura	2	6^{4}
9	(Denmark) K Carlsen	6	7^{7}
14	(South Africa) W Moodie	1	6^{3}
WC	(Japan) T Suzuki	6	7^{7}
(Belgium) D Norman	6	6^{3}	6^{2}
3	(Thailand) P Srichaphan	4	7^{7}	7^{7}

Third round
7	(South Korea) H-T Lee	6	6
9	(Denmark) K Carlsen	3	4
WC	(Japan) T Suzuki	2	6^{3}
3	(Thailand) P Srichaphan	6	7^{7}

Quarterfinals
7	(South Korea) H-T Lee	6	6^{5}	3
3	(Thailand) P Srichaphan	4	7^{7}	6

==== Section 4 ====
First round
(Peru) I Miranda	6	4	4
(Czech Republic) B Ulihrach	2	6	6
(Czech Republic) T Berdych	6^{2}	6	3
Q	(Switzerland) M Kratochvil	7^{7}	4	6
(Sweden) A Vinciguerra	6	4	1
(Netherlands) D van Scheppingen	4	6	6
(Sweden) R Söderling	4	4
(Croatia) I Karlović	6	6

Second round
8	(United States) J-M Gambill	6	6
(Czech Republic) B Ulihrach	3	4
Q	(Switzerland) M Kratochvil	6	6
12	(Netherlands) J van Lottum	2	3
16	(France) G Carraz	5	6	5
(Netherlands) D van Scheppingen	7	1	7
(Croatia) I Karlović	3	6^{8}
2	(France) S Grosjean	6	7^{10}

Third round
8	(United States) J-M Gambill	6	7
Q	(Switzerland) M Kratochvil	3	5
(Netherlands) D van Scheppingen	3	6^{3}
2	(France) S Grosjean	6	7^{7}

Quarterfinals
8	(United States) J-M Gambill	3	6^{4}
2	(France) S Grosjean	6	7^{7}
