= 2002 AIG Japan Open Tennis Championships – Men's doubles =

Men's doubles
- 2002 AIG Japan Open Tennis Championships

Final
- Champions: (South Africa) Jeff Coetzee (South Africa) Chris Haggard
- Runners-up: (United States) Jan-Michael Gambill (United States) Graydon Oliver
- Score: 7–6^{(7–4)}, 6–4

Details
- Draw: 28 (3WC)
- Seeds: 8

Events
Singles	men	women
Doubles	men	women
- AIG Japan Open Tennis Championships

Rick Leach and David Macpherson were the defending champions but lost in the semifinals to Jan-Michael Gambill and Graydon Oliver.

Jeff Coetzee and Chris Haggard won in the final 7–6^{(7–4)}, 6–4 against Gambill and Oliver.

== Seeds ==
The top five seeded teams received byes into the second round.

1. (Zimbabwe) Wayne Black / (Zimbabwe) Kevin Ullyett (semifinals)
2. (South Africa) David Adams / (United States) Brian MacPhie (second round)
3. (United States) Rick Leach / (Australia) David Macpherson (semifinals)
4. (Czech Republic) Petr Pála / (Czech Republic) Pavel Vízner (second round)
5. (Austria) Julian Knowle / (Germany) Michael Kohlmann (second round)
6. (Australia) Wayne Arthurs / (Australia) Andrew Kratzmann (first round)
7. (Sweden) Simon Aspelin / (Japan) Thomas Shimada (quarterfinals)
8. (Czech Republic) Ota Fukárek / (Czech Republic) Petr Luxa (second round)

== Draw ==
Key

- Q = Qualifier
- WC = Wild card
- LL = Lucky loser
- Alt = Alternate
- ITF = ITF entry
- PR = Protected ranking
- SR = Special ranking
- SE = Special exempt
- JE = Junior exempt
- JR = Junior Accelerator Programme entrant
- CO = College Accelerator Programme entrant
- NG = Next Gen Accelerator Program entrant
- w/o = Walkover
- r = Retired
- d = Defaulted

=== Final ===
Semifinals

Final

1
- (Zimbabwe) Wayne Black
- (Zimbabwe) Kevin Ullyett
4
6^{8}

- (South Africa) Jeff Coetzee
- (South Africa) Chris Haggard
6
7^{10}

- (South Africa) Jeff Coetzee
- (South Africa) Chris Haggard
7^{7}
6

- (United States) Jan-Michael Gambill
- (United States) Graydon Oliver
6^{4}
4

3
- (United States) Rick Leach
- (Australia) David Macpherson
6^{1}
6^{5}

- (United States) Jan-Michael Gambill
- (United States) Graydon Oliver
7^{7}
7^{7}

=== Top half ===
First round

Second round

Quarterfinals

Semifinals

1
- (Zimbabwe) W Black
- (Zimbabwe) K Ullyett
6
5
6

WC
- (Japan) S Iwabuchi
- (Japan) T Suzuki
6
3
6

WC
- (Japan) S Iwabuchi
- (Japan) T Suzuki
3
7
3

WC
- (Ecuador) N Lapentti
- (Ecuador) L Morejón
1
6
3

1
- (Zimbabwe) W Black
- (Zimbabwe) K Ullyett
6
6

WC
- (Japan) J Kato
- (Japan) G Motomura
4
6
6

WC
- (Japan) J Kato
- (Japan) G Motomura
2
2

- (United States) D Bowen
- (Australia) A Fisher
6
3
2

WC
- (Japan) J Kato
- (Japan) G Motomura
2
6
7^{7}

- (Australia) N Healey
- (Australia) J Kerr
7^{7}
2
7^{7}

- (Australia) N Healey
- (Australia) J Kerr
6
1
6^{5}

6
- (Australia) W Arthurs
- (Australia) A Kratzmann
6^{2}
6
6^{4}

1
- (Zimbabwe) W Black
- (Zimbabwe) K Ullyett
4
6^{8}

- (South Africa) J Coetzee
- (South Africa) C Haggard
6
7^{10}

4
- (Czech Republic) P Pála
- (Czech Republic) P Vízner
2
2

- (United States) M Fish
- (United States) J Morrison
4
4

- (South Africa) J Coetzee
- (South Africa) C Haggard
6
6

- (South Africa) J Coetzee
- (South Africa) C Haggard
6
6

- (South Africa) J Coetzee
- (South Africa) C Haggard
6
7^{7}

- (Australia) S Huss
- (Australia) L Pearson
2
6^{3}

- (United States) J Blake
- (United States) T Blake
2
6^{3}

- (United States) J Blake
- (United States) T Blake
6
7^{7}

- (United States) J Blake
- (United States) T Blake
6
4
6

- (Germany) L Burgsmüller
- (Israel) N Okun
6
6^{2}
3

5
- (Austria) J Knowle
- (Germany) M Kohlmann
4
6
4

5
- (Austria) J Knowle
- (Germany) M Kohlmann
4
7^{7}
6

=== Bottom half ===
First round

Second round

Quarterfinals

Semifinals

7
- (Sweden) S Aspelin
- (Japan) T Shimada
6
7^{8}

- (United States) S Humphries
- (The Bahamas) M Merklein
3
6^{6}

7
- (Sweden) S Aspelin
- (Japan) T Shimada
6
6

- (Australia) A Ross
- (South Africa) S Rudman
1
6^{3}

- (United States) M Chang
- (Slovakia) D Hrbatý
2
3

- (United States) M Chang
- (Slovakia) D Hrbatý
6
7^{7}

7
- (Sweden) S Aspelin
- (Japan) T Shimada
6
4
2

- (United States) B Coupe
- (Germany) A Waske
6^{4}
2

3
- (United States) R Leach
- (Australia) D Macpherson
3
6
6

ALT
- (United States) C Mamiit
- (United States) B Vahaly
7^{7}
6

ALT
- (United States) C Mamiit
- (United States) B Vahaly
6^{0}
1

3
- (United States) R Leach
- (Australia) D Macpherson
7^{7}
6

3
- (United States) R Leach
- (Australia) D Macpherson
6^{1}
6^{5}

8
- (Czech Republic) O Fukárek
- (Czech Republic) P Luxa
1
6
6

- (United States) J-M Gambill
- (United States) G Oliver
7^{7}
7^{7}

(Australia) A Florent
(Federal Republic of Yugoslavia) D Vemić
6
2
4

8
- (Czech Republic) O Fukárek
- (Czech Republic) P Luxa
3
3

- (Switzerland) G Bastl
- (United States) G Weiner
6^{3}
6
6

- (Switzerland) G Bastl
- (United States) G Weiner
6
6

- (Argentina) A Calleri
- (Paraguay) R Delgado
7^{7}
4
2

- (Switzerland) G Bastl
- (United States) G Weiner
3
6
4

- (United States) J Thomas
- (Belgium) T Vanhoudt
6^{4}
3

- (United States) J-M Gambill
- (United States) G Oliver
6
3
6

- (United States) J-M Gambill
- (United States) G Oliver
7^{7}
6

- (United States) J-M Gambill
- (United States) G Oliver
4
6
6

2
- (South Africa) D Adams
- (United States) B MacPhie
6
3
2
