= Maika Ozaki (tennis) =

Japanese tennis player (born 1984)

- Country (sports): Japan
- Born: 25 October 1984 (age 40); Hokkaido, Japan
- Plays: Right-handed
- Prize money: $27,655

Singles
- Career record: 1 ITF
- Highest ranking: No. 320 (8 Sep 2003)

Doubles
- Highest ranking: No. 648 (18 Jul 2005)

Maika Ozaki (Japanese:尾崎 真衣加, born 25 October 1984) is a Japanese former professional tennis player.

Born in Hokkaido, Ozaki reached best singles world ranking of 320. She won one title on the ITF Women's Circuit and featured in the main draw of the 2003 Japan Open, losing in the first round to Ashley Harkleroad.

== ITF finals ==
=== Singles: 4 (1–3) ===
Outcome	No.	Date	Tournament	Surface	Opponent	Score
Runner-up	1.	Sep 2002	ITF Hiroshima, Japan	Clay	(Japan) Shiho Hisamatsu	6–3, 1–6, 3–6
Winner	1.	May 2003	ITF Gunma, Japan	Grass	(Japan) Ayami Takase	6–2, 6–4
Runner-up	2.	Sep 2004	ITF Kyoto, Japan	Carpet	(Japan) Haruka Inoue	4–6, 1–6
Runner-up	3.	Sep 2006	ITF Hiroshima, Japan	Carpet	(Japan) Yuka Kuroda	6–7^{(5)}, 3–6
