= 2004 AIG Japan Open Tennis Championships – Women's doubles =

Women's doubles
- 2004 AIG Japan Open Tennis Championships

Final
- Champions: (Japan) Shinobu Asagoe (Slovenia) Katarina Srebotnik
- Runners-up: (United States) Jennifer Hopkins (United States) Mashona Washington
- Score: 6–1, 6–4

Details
- Draw: 16 (1Q / 1WC / 1LL)
- Seeds: 4

Events
Singles	men	women
Doubles	men	women
- Japan Open

Maria Sharapova and Tamarine Tanasugarn were the defending champions, but decided to focus on the singles tournament only. Sharapova would eventually win the title.

Shinobu Asagoe and Katarina Srebotnik won the title by defeating Jennifer Hopkins and Mashona Washington 6–1, 6–4 in the final.

== Seeds ==
1. (Japan) Shinobu Asagoe / (Slovenia) Katarina Srebotnik (champions)
2. (Venezuela) Milagros Sequera / (United States) Abigail Spears (first round)
3. (United States) ~~Jill Craybas~~ / (Germany) ~~Marlene Weingärtner~~ (withdrew)
4. (Australia) Bryanne Stewart / (Australia) Samantha Stosur (semifinals)
5. (United States) Jennifer Hopkins / (United States) Mashona Washington (final)

== Draw ==
Key

- Q = Qualifier
- WC = Wild card
- LL = Lucky loser
- Alt = Alternate
- ITF = ITF entry
- PR = Protected ranking
- SR = Special ranking
- SE = Special exempt
- JE = Junior exempt
- JR = Junior Accelerator Programme entrant
- CO = College Accelerator Programme entrant
- NG = Next Gen Accelerator Program entrant
- w/o = Walkover
- r = Retired
- d = Defaulted

=== Draw ===
First round
1	(Japan) S Asagoe (Slovenia) K Srebotnik	6	6
(Japan) S Hisamatsu (Japan) A Takase	2	3
(Spain) A Parra Santonja (Israel) S Pe'er	6	3	3
(Japan) S Okamoto (Japan) M Saeki	3	6	6
4	(Australia) B Stewart (Australia) S Stosur	6	6
(South Africa) K Grant (Germany) A Matic	3	4
LL	(Japan) R Takemura (Japan) T Yonemura	3
(Colombia) C Castaño (Switzerland) E Gagliardi	2^{r}
(Poland) K Jans (Poland) A Rosolska	3	4
Q	(Japan) M Arai (Japan) R Tezuka	6	6
WC	(Bulgaria) S Karatantcheva (Czech Republic) N Vaidišová	5	2
5	(United States) J Hopkins (United States) M Washington	7	6
(Japan) R Fujiwara (Japan) S Obata	6	6
(Chinese Taipei) C-w Chan (Japan) N Miyagi	4	1
(Russia) A Jidkova (Slovakia) Ľ Kurhajcová	6	6
2	(Venezuela) M Sequera (United States) A Spears	2	4

Quarterfinals
1	(Japan) S Asagoe (Slovenia) K Srebotnik	7^{7}	6
(Japan) S Okamoto (Japan) M Saeki	6^{2}	2
4	(Australia) B Stewart (Australia) S Stosur	6	6
LL	(Japan) R Takemura (Japan) T Yonemura	0	4
Q	(Japan) M Arai (Japan) R Tezuka	1	2
5	(United States) J Hopkins (United States) M Washington	6	6
(Japan) R Fujiwara (Japan) S Obata	6	6
(Russia) A Jidkova (Slovakia) Ľ Kurhajcová	3	1

Semifinals
1	(Japan) S Asagoe (Slovenia) K Srebotnik	4	7^{7}	7
4	(Australia) B Stewart (Australia) S Stosur	6	6^{4}	5
5	(United States) J Hopkins (United States) M Washington	6	6
(Japan) R Fujiwara (Japan) S Obata	2	3

Final
1	(Japan) S Asagoe (Slovenia) K Srebotnik	6	6
5	(United States) J Hopkins (United States) M Washington	1	4
