= 2002 AIG Japan Open Tennis Championships – Men's singles =

Men's singles
- 2002 AIG Japan Open Tennis Championships

Final
- Champion: (Denmark) Kenneth Carlsen
- Runner-up: (Sweden) Magnus Norman
- Score: 7–6^{(8–6)}, 6–3

Details
- Draw: 56 (7 Q / 5 WC )
- Seeds: 16

Events
Singles	men	women
Doubles	men	women
- Japan Open

Lleyton Hewitt was the defending champion but lost in the quarterfinals to Paradorn Srichaphan.

Kenneth Carlsen won in the final 7–6^{(8–6)}, 6–3 against Magnus Norman.

== Seeds ==
The top eight seeds received a bye to the second round.

1. (Australia) Lleyton Hewitt (quarterfinals)
2. (Spain) Juan Carlos Ferrero (second round)
3. (Spain) Carlos Moyá (second round)
4. (Spain) Àlex Corretja (second round)
5. (Argentina) Juan Ignacio Chela (third round)
6. (United States) James Blake (second round)
7. (Ecuador) Nicolás Lapentti (second round)
8. (Thailand) Paradorn Srichaphan (semifinals)
9. (Austria) Stefan Koubek (first round)
10. (United States) Jan-Michael Gambill (first round)
11. (Slovakia) Dominik Hrbatý (second round)
12. (Argentina) Agustín Calleri (second round)
13. (Australia) Wayne Arthurs (second round)
14. (Chile) Nicolás Massú (third round)
15. (Spain) David Ferrer (first round)
16. (United States) Taylor Dent (third round)

== Draw ==
Key

- Q = Qualifier
- WC = Wild card
- LL = Lucky loser
- Alt = Alternate
- ITF = ITF entry
- PR = Protected ranking
- SR = Special ranking
- SE = Special exempt
- JE = Junior exempt
- JR = Junior Accelerator Programme entrant
- CO = College Accelerator Programme entrant
- NG = Next Gen Accelerator Program entrant
- w/o = Walkover
- r = Retired
- d = Defaulted

=== Finals ===
Semifinals
8	(Thailand) Paradorn Srichaphan	6^{4}	6^{5}
(Denmark) Kenneth Carlsen	7^{7}	7^{7}
(United States) Vince Spadea	4	6^{4}
Q	(Sweden) Magnus Norman	6	7^{7}

Final
(Denmark) Kenneth Carlsen	7^{8}	6
Q	(Sweden) Magnus Norman	6^{6}	3

=== Top half ===
==== Section 1 ====
First round
(Spain) F Clavet	5	6	3
(United States) M Chang	7	4	6
(United States) J Morrison	6	7^{7}
(Belgium) D Norman	3	6^{3}
(Czech Republic) R Štěpánek	7	3	2
14	(Chile) N Massú	5	6	6
10	(United States) J-M Gambill	4	6	3
(Japan) T Suzuki	6	3	6
(Paraguay) R Delgado	4	3
(United States) B Vahaly	6	6
(Germany) L Burgsmüller	6	6
(Czech Republic) O Fukárek	3	3

Second round
1	(Australia) L Hewitt	6	6
(United States) M Chang	2	2
(United States) J Morrison	6^{7}	6	1
14	(Chile) N Massú	7^{9}	4	6
(Japan) T Suzuki	6	7^{7}
(United States) B Vahaly	3	6^{3}
(Germany) L Burgsmüller	3	4
8	(Thailand) P Srichaphan	6	6

Third round
1	(Australia) L Hewitt	6^{4}	6	6
14	(Chile) N Massú	7^{7}	2	4
(Japan) T Suzuki	6	1	4
8	(Thailand) P Srichaphan	3	6	6

Quarterfinals
1	(Australia) L Hewitt	4	3
8	(Thailand) P Srichaphan	6	6

==== Section 2 ====
First round
(Germany) A Waske	6^{4}	7^{7}	6
WC	(Japan) M Onoda	7^{7}	6^{3}	2
Q	(Czech Republic) P Luxa	3	4
(France) A Dupuis	6	6
(Austria) J Knowle	6	3	2
13	(Australia) W Arthurs	2	6	6
11	(Slovakia) D Hrbatý	6	6
WC	(Japan) T Terachi	1	2
(Denmark) K Carlsen	6	6
(Israel) N Okun	4	4
(Brazil) A Simoni	3	6	2
(United States) C Mamiit	6	3	6

Second round
3	(Spain) C Moyá	4	5
(Germany) A Waske	6	7
(France) A Dupuis	7^{7}	7^{8}
13	(Australia) W Arthurs	6^{5}	6^{6}
11	(Slovakia) D Hrbatý	4	4
(Denmark) K Carlsen	6	6
(United States) C Mamiit	1	0
5	(Argentina) J I Chela	6	6

Third round
(Germany) A Waske	2	6	6^{4}
(France) A Dupuis	6	4	7^{7}
(Denmark) K Carlsen	6^{4}	7^{7}	7^{7}
5	(Argentina) J I Chela	7^{7}	6^{5}	6^{3}

Quarterfinals
(France) A Dupuis	3	2
(Denmark) K Carlsen	6	6

=== Bottom half ===
==== Section 3 ====
First round
(Netherlands) M Verkerk	6	6
(Czech Republic) J Vacek	3	4
(United States) M Fish	4	7^{9}	6
WC	(Japan) G Motomura	6	6^{7}	2
(Spain) F López	6	6
9	(Austria) S Koubek	4	4
15	(Spain) D Ferrer	6	5	5
Q	(United States) T Blake	4	7	7
Q	(Australia) J Crabb	2	4
(United States) V Spadea	6	6
Q	(Germany) M Abel	6	6^{2}	4
(Slovakia) K Kučera	4	7^{7}	6

Second round
6	(United States) J Blake	3	6	3
(Netherlands) M Verkerk	6	3	6
(United States) M Fish	6^{3}	4
(Spain) F López	7^{7}	6
Q	(United States) T Blake	1	4
(United States) V Spadea	6	6
(Slovakia) K Kučera	3	6	7^{7}
4	(Spain) À Corretja	6	3	6^{3}

Third round
(Netherlands) M Verkerk	2	7^{8}	1
(Spain) F López	6	6^{6}	6
(United States) V Spadea	7	7^{8}
(Slovakia) K Kučera	5	6^{6}

Quarterfinals
(Spain) F López	3	0
(United States) V Spadea	6	6

==== Section 4 ====
First round
Q	(Sweden) M Larsson	7^{7}	6
(Croatia) M Ančić	6^{4}	2
WC	(Japan) J Miyao	0	0
(France) J Golmard	6	6
(United States) A Kim	4	4
12	(Argentina) A Calleri	6	6
16	(United States) T Dent	6	7
WC	(Japan) H Kondo	0	5
Q	(United States) D Bohaboy	1	3
(Germany) M Kohlmann	6	6
Q	(Sweden) M Norman	6	6
(Switzerland) G Bastl	3	0

Second round
7	(Ecuador) N Lapentti	5	2
Q	(Sweden) M Larsson	7	6
(France) J Golmard	6	6
12	(Argentina) A Calleri	3	2
16	(United States) T Dent	6	6
(Germany) M Kohlmann	4	4
Q	(Sweden) M Norman	6	6
2	(Spain) J C Ferrero	3	3

Third round
Q	(Sweden) M Larsson	3	6	6
(France) J Golmard	6	3	4
16	(United States) T Dent	3	2
Q	(Sweden) M Norman	6	6

Quarterfinals
Q	(Sweden) M Larsson	6^{5}	5
Q	(Sweden) M Norman	7^{7}	7
