= 2002 AIG Japan Open Tennis Championships – Women's singles =

Women's singles
- 2002 AIG Japan Open Tennis Championships

Final
- Champion: (United States) Jill Craybas
- Runner-up: (Croatia) Silvija Talaja
- Score: 2–6, 6–4, 6–4

Details
- Draw: 30 (4 Q / 2 WC )
- Seeds: 8

Events
| Singles | men | women |
| Doubles | men | women |
| ← 2001 · | Japan Open | · 2003 → |

Monica Seles was the defending champion, but did not compete this year.

Unseeded Jill Craybas won the title by defeating Silvija Talaja 2–6, 6–4, 6–4 in the final. It was the 1st title for Craybas in her singles career.

== Seeds ==
The first two seeds received a bye into the second round.

1. (Japan) Ai Sugiyama (quarterfinals)
2. (Thailand) Tamarine Tanasugarn (semifinals)
3. (Spain) Arantxa Sánchez Vicario (second round)
4. (Switzerland) Emmanuelle Gagliardi (second round)
5. (Zimbabwe) Cara Black (first round)
6. (Russia) Svetlana Kuznetsova (second round)
7. (Spain) Virginia Ruano Pascual (second round)
8. (Croatia) Jelena Kostanić (quarterfinals)

== Draw ==
=== Key ===
- Q = Qualifier
- WC = Wild card
- LL = Lucky loser
- Alt = Alternate
- ITF = ITF entry
- PR = Protected ranking
- SR = Special ranking
- SE = Special exempt
- JE = Junior exempt
- JR = Junior Accelerator Programme entrant
- CO = College Accelerator Programme entrant
- NG = Next Gen Accelerator Program entrant
- w/o = Walkover
- r = Retired
- d = Defaulted

=== Finals ===
Semifinals
(Croatia) Silvija Talaja | 6 | 6
(United States) Sarah Taylor | 3 | 4
(United States) Jill Craybas | 6 | 4 | 6
2 | (Thailand) Tamarine Tanasugarn | 4 | 6 | 4

Final
(Croatia) Silvija Talaja | 6 | 4 | 4
(United States) Jill Craybas | 2 | 6 | 6

=== Top half ===
First round
(Japan) A Morigami | 6 | 6
(Paraguay) R de los Ríos | 4 | 2
(Japan) S Asagoe | 4 | 6 | 0
(Croatia) S Talaja | 6 | 3 | 6
Q | (South Korea) J-h Kim | 0 | 1
7 | (Spain) V Ruano Pascual | 6 | 6
3 | (Spain) A Sánchez Vicario | 6 | 6
Q | (Russia) M Kirilenko | 3 | 2
(United States) S Taylor | 6 | 6
(Australia) E Dominikovic | 2 | 2
(United States) A Cargill | 6 | 7^{7}
Q | (South Korea) K-m Chang | 3 | 6^{2}
WC | (Japan) Y Yoshida | 6 | 6
5 | (Zimbabwe) C Black | 2 | 1

Second round
1 | (Japan) A Sugiyama | 6 | 7
(Japan) A Morigami | 3 | 5
(Croatia) S Talaja | 6 | 6
7 | (Spain) V Ruano Pascual | 2 | 3
3 | (Spain) A Sánchez Vicario | 3 | 6^{3}
(United States) S Taylor | 6 | 7^{7}
(United States) A Cargill | 7^{7} | 5 | 4
WC | (Japan) Y Yoshida | 6^{5} | 7 | 6

Quarterfinals
1 | (Japan) A Sugiyama | 6 | 6^{5} | 3
(Croatia) S Talaja | 3 | 7^{7} | 6
(United States) S Taylor | 6 | 6
WC | (Japan) Y Yoshida | 4 | 2

Semifinals
(Croatia) S Talaja | 6 | 6
(United States) S Taylor | 3 | 4

=== Bottom half ===
First round
8 | (Croatia) J Kostanić | 6 | 7^{7}
(Japan) S Obata | 4 | 6^{3}
(Spain) M Marrero | 6 | 6
Q | (Japan) S Okamoto | 3 | 3
(United States) J Craybas | 7^{9} | 6
(Japan) M Saeki | 6^{7} | 0
WC | (Russia) M Sharapova | 6 | 6^{4} | 4
4 | (Switzerland) E Gagliardi | 2 | 7^{7} | 6
6 | (Russia) S Kuznetsova | 7 | 6
(France) V Razzano | 5 | 2
(Canada) V Webb | 0 | 5
(Australia) A Molik | 6 | 7
(Republic of Ireland) K Liggan | 6 | 4 | 6
(Japan) R Fujiwara | 3 | 6 | 2

Second round
8 | (Croatia) J Kostanić | 5 | 6 | 6
(Spain) M Marrero | 7 | 0 | 2
(United States) J Craybas | 6 | 4 | 6
4 | (Switzerland) E Gagliardi | 3 | 6 | 3
6 | (Russia) S Kuznetsova | 6^{3} | 2
(Australia) A Molik | 7^{7} | 6
(Republic of Ireland) K Liggan | 2 | 6 | 6^{1}
2 | (Thailand) T Tanasugarn | 6 | 1 | 7^{7}

Quarterfinals
8 | (Croatia) J Kostanić | 2 | 1
(United States) J Craybas | 6 | 6
(Australia) A Molik | 4 | 6 | 1
2 | (Thailand) T Tanasugarn | 6 | 1 | 6

Semifinals
(United States) J Craybas | 6 | 4 | 6
2 | (Thailand) T Tanasugarn | 4 | 6 | 4
