= 2004 AIG Japan Open Tennis Championships – Men's singles =

Men's singles
- 2004 AIG Japan Open Tennis Championships

Final
- Champion: (Czech Republic) Jiří Novák
- Runner-up: (United States) Taylor Dent
- Score: 5–7, 6–1, 6–3

Details
- Draw: 48 (6 Q / 4 WC )
- Seeds: 16

Events
| Singles | men | women |
| Doubles | men | women |
- Japan Open

Rainer Schüttler was the defending champion, but did not participate.

== Seeds ==
All seeds receive a bye into the second round.

1. (Australia) Lleyton Hewitt (semifinals)
2. (Argentina) David Nalbandian (third round)
3. (Romania) Andrei Pavel (second round)
4. (Thailand) Paradorn Srichaphan (quarterfinals)
5. (Czech Republic) Jiří Novák (champion)
6. (Argentina) Guillermo Cañas (second round)
7. (United States) Taylor Dent (final)
8. (Sweden) Thomas Johansson (third round)
9. (France) Cyril Saulnier (quarterfinals)
10. (South Korea) Hyung-Taik Lee (third round)
11. (Brazil) Ricardo Mello (third round)
12. (Finland) Jarkko Nieminen (second round)
13. (United States) Jan-Michael Gambill (third round)
14. (Netherlands) Dennis van Scheppingen (second round)
15. (Czech Republic) Jan Hernych (second round)
16. (Luxembourg) Gilles Müller (quarterfinals)

== Draw ==
Key

- Q = Qualifier
- WC = Wild card
- LL = Lucky loser
- Alt = Alternate
- ITF = ITF entry
- PR = Protected ranking
- SR = Special ranking
- SE = Special exempt
- JE = Junior exempt
- JR = Junior Accelerator Programme entrant
- CO = College Accelerator Programme entrant
- NG = Next Gen Accelerator Program entrant
- w/o = Walkover
- r = Retired
- d = Defaulted

=== Finals ===
Quarterfinals
1 | (Australia) Lleyton Hewitt | 7 | 6
9 | (France) Cyril Saulnier | 5 | 1
4 | (Thailand) Paradorn Srichaphan | 4 | 4
5 | (Czech Republic) Jiří Novák | 6 | 6
(Czech Republic) Bohdan Ulihrach | 7 | 6
Q | (Germany) Björn Phau | 5 | 4
7 | (United States) Taylor Dent | 6 | 4 | 6
16 | (Luxembourg) Gilles Müller | 4 | 6 | 2

Semifinals
1 | (Australia) Lleyton Hewitt | 4 | 6 | 2
5 | (Czech Republic) Jiří Novák | 6 | 4 | 6
(Czech Republic) Bohdan Ulihrach | 6 | 4 | 1
7 | (United States) Taylor Dent | 4 | 6 | 6

Final
5 | (Czech Republic) Jiří Novák | 5 | 6 | 6
7 | (United States) Taylor Dent | 7 | 1 | 3

=== Top half ===
==== Section 1 ====
First round
(United States) G Weiner | 4 | 3
WC | (Japan) G Motomura | 6 | 6
(Chile) A García | 6^{6} | 6^{4}
WC | (Japan) T Suzuki | 7^{8} | 7^{7}
Q | (Denmark) K Pless | 6^{2} | 6^{0}
(France) N Thomann | 7^{7} | 7^{7}
(Belgium) C Rochus | 6^{r}
(United States) J Gimelstob | 6

Second round
1 | (Australia) L Hewitt | 6 | 3 | 6
WC | (Japan) G Motomura | 0 | 6 | 1
WC | (Japan) T Suzuki | 7^{7} | 3 | 7
15 | (Czech Republic) J Hernych | 6 | 6^{4} | 5
9 | (France) C Saulnier | 2 | 6 | 6
(France) N Thomann | 6 | 1 | 4
(United States) J Gimelstob | 4 | 4
8 | (Sweden) T Johansson | 6 | 6

Third round
1 | (Australia) L Hewitt | 6^{3} | 6 | 6
WC | (Japan) T Suzuki | 7^{7} | 2 | 4
9 | (France) C Saulnier | 6^{6} | 7^{7} | 7^{7}
8 | (Sweden) T Johansson | 7^{8} | 6^{3} | 6^{5}

Quarterfinals
1 | (Australia) L Hewitt | 7 | 6
9 | (France) C Saulnier | 5 | 1

==== Section 2 ====
First round
(Chinese Taipei) Y-h Lu | 6^{1} | 6^{1}
(Israel) H Levy | 7^{7} | 7^{7}
(Austria) A Peya | 6 | 3 | 4
Q | (Switzerland) M Chiudinelli | 4 | 6 | 6
(Czech Republic) J Vacek | 3 | 4
(Brazil) F Saretta | 6 | 6
(Spain) G García López | 6 | 2 | 6
(Germany) L Burgsmüller | 4 | 6 | 3

Second round
4 | (Thailand) P Srichaphan | 2 | 7^{7} | 6
(Israel) H Levy | 6 | 6^{3} | 4
Q | (Switzerland) M Chiudinelli | 6 | 7^{7}
14 | (Netherlands) D van Scheppingen | 4 | 6^{3}
11 | (Brazil) R Mello | 5 | 6 | 7^{7}
(Brazil) F Saretta | 7 | 2 | 6^{5}
(Spain) G García López | 5 | 2
5 | (Czech Republic) J Novák | 7 | 6

Third round
4 | (Thailand) P Srichaphan | 6 | 4
Q | (Switzerland) M Chiudinelli | 3 | 1^{r}
11 | (Brazil) R Mello | 1 | 2
5 | (Czech Republic) J Novák | 6 | 6

Quarterfinals
4 | (Thailand) P Srichaphan | 4 | 4
5 | (Czech Republic) J Novák | 6 | 6

=== Bottom half ===
==== Section 3 ====
First round
(Denmark) K Carlsen | 5 | 2
Q | (Germany) M Kohlmann
(Czech Republic) B Ulihrach | 6 | 6
(Israel) N Okun | 4 | 1
Q | (Japan) S Iwabuchi | 6 | 6
WC | (Japan) T Terachi | 1 | 3
Q | (Germany) B Phau | 6 | 6
WC | (Japan) T Iwami | 4 | 1

Second round
6 | (Argentina) G Cañas | 6 | 6^{2} | 3
Q | (Germany) M Kohlmann | 4 | 7^{7} | 6
(Czech Republic) B Ulihrach | 6 | 7^{7}
12 | (Finland) J Nieminen | 3 | 6^{5}
13 | (United States) J-M Gambill | 7^{7} | 6
(Japan) S Iwabuchi | 6^{5} | 1
Q | (Germany) B Phau | 6 | 6
3 | (Romania) A Pavel | 2 | 1

Third round
Q | (Germany) M Kohlmann | 4 | 2
(Czech Republic) B Ulihrach | 6 | 6
13 | (United States) J-M Gambill | 6^{1} | 6 | 2
Q | (Germany) B Phau | 7 | 2 | 6

Quarterfinals
(Czech Republic) B Ulihrach | 7 | 6
Q | (Germany) B Phau | 5 | 4

==== Section 4 ====
First round
(Australia) M Philippoussis | 3 | 4
(Czech Republic) T Zíb | 6 | 6
(Australia) W Arthurs | 6 | 7
(France) J-R Lisnard | 4 | 5
(France) A Bogomolov | 6 | 3 | 7^{7}
(Serbia) J Tipsarević | 3 | 6 | 6^{2}
Q | (Chinese Taipei) YT Wang | 6 | 7^{7}
(United States) J Morrison | 3 | 6^{1}

Second round
7 | (United States) T Dent | 6 | 6
(Czech Republic) T Zíb | 3 | 4
(Australia) W Arthurs | 2 | 6^{2}
10 | (South Korea) H-T Lee | 6 | 7^{7}
16 | (Luxembourg) G Müller | 6 | 6
(France) A Bogomolov | 3 | 1
(Chinese Taipei) YT Wang | 6 | 6^{4} | 2
2 | (Argentina) D Nalbandian | 3 | 7 | 6

Third round
7 | (United States) T Dent | 7 | 5 | 6
10 | (South Korea) H-T Lee | 6^{4} | 7 | 3
16 | (Luxembourg) G Müller | 7 | 3 | 6
2 | (Argentina) D Nalbandian | 6^{4} | 6 | 4

Quarterfinals
7 | (United States) T Dent | 6 | 4 | 6
16 | (Luxembourg) G Müller | 4 | 6 | 2
