= 2004 AIG Japan Open Tennis Championships =

- Date: 4–10 October
- Edition: 31st
- Surface: Hard / outdoors
- Location: Tokyo, Japan
- Venue: Ariake Coliseum

Champions

Men's singles
- (Czech Republic) Jiří Novák

Women's singles
- (Russia) Maria Sharapova

Men's doubles
- (United States) Jared Palmer / (Czech Republic) Pavel Vízner

Women's doubles
- (Japan) Shinobu Asagoe / (Slovenia) Katarina Srebotnik
- Japan Open

The 2004 AIG Japan Open Tennis Championships was a combined men's and women's tennis tournament played on outdoor hard courts at the Ariake Coliseum in Tokyo in Japan. The men's tournament was part of the International Series Gold of the 2004 ATP Tour and the women's tournament was part of the Tier III category of the 2004 WTA Tour. It was the 31st edition of the event and was held from 4 October through 10 October 2004. Jiří Novák and Maria Sharapova won the singles titles.

== Finals ==
=== Men's singles ===
(Czech Republic) Jiří Novák defeated (United States) Taylor Dent 5–7, 6–1, 6–3

- It was Novák's 1st singles title of the year and the 6th of his career.

=== Women's singles ===
(Russia) Maria Sharapova defeated (United States) Mashona Washington 6–0, 6–1

- It was Sharapova's 4th singles title of the year and the 6th of her career.

=== Men's doubles ===
(United States) Jared Palmer / (Czech Republic) Pavel Vízner defeated (Czech Republic) Jiří Novák / (Czech Republic) Petr Pála 5–1 ret.

- It was Palmer's 3rd doubles title of the year and the 28th and last of his career. It was Vízner's 3rd doubles title of the year and the 8th of his career.

=== Women's doubles ===
(Japan) Shinobu Asagoe / (Slovenia) Katarina Srebotnik defeated (United States) Jennifer Hopkins / (United States) Mashona Washington 6–1, 6–4

- It was Asagoe's 3rd doubles title of the year and the 5th of her career. It was Srebotnik's 1st doubles title of the year and the 7th of her career.
