= 2002 AIG Japan Open Tennis Championships =

Combined tennis tournament

- Date: September 30 – October 6
- Edition: 29th
- Surface: Hard / outdoor
- Location: Tokyo, Japan
- Venue: Ariake Coliseum

Champions

Men's singles
- (Denmark) Kenneth Carlsen

Women's singles
- (United States) Jill Craybas

Men's doubles
- (South Africa) Jeff Coetzee / (South Africa) Chris Haggard

Women's doubles
- (Japan) Shinobu Asagoe / (Japan) Nana Miyagi
← 2001 ·	Japan Open	· 2003 →

The 2002 AIG Japan Open Tennis Championships was a combined men's and women's tennis tournament played on outdoor hard courts at the Ariake Coliseum in Tokyo in Japan that was part of the International Series Gold of the 2002 ATP Tour and of Tier III of the 2002 WTA Tour. The tournament ran from September 30 through October 6, 2002. Kenneth Carlsen and Jill Craybas won the singles titles.

== Finals ==
=== Men's singles ===
(Denmark) Kenneth Carlsen defeated (Sweden) Magnus Norman 7–6^{(8–6)}, 6–3

- It was Carlsen's only title of the year and the 2nd of his career.

=== Women's singles ===
(United States) Jill Craybas defeated (Croatia) Silvija Talaja 2–6, 6–4, 6–4

- It was Craybas' only title of the year and the 1st of her career.

=== Men's doubles ===
(South Africa) Jeff Coetzee / (South Africa) Chris Haggard defeated (United States) Jan-Michael Gambill / (United States) Graydon Oliver 7–6^{(7–4)}, 6–4

- It was Coetzee's 2nd title of the year and the 2nd of his career. It was Haggard's 2nd title of the year and the 3rd of his career.

=== Women's doubles ===
(Japan) Shinobu Asagoe / (Japan) Nana Miyagi defeated (Russia) Svetlana Kuznetsova / (Spain) Arantxa Sánchez-Vicario 6–4, 4–6, 6–4

- It was Asagoe's 2nd title of the year and the 2nd of her career. It was Miyagi's only title of the year and the 10th of her career.
