= 2004 AIG Japan Open Tennis Championships – Men's doubles =

Men's doubles
- 2004 AIG Japan Open Tennis Championships

Final
- Champions: (United States) Jared Palmer (Czech Republic) Pavel Vízner
- Runners-up: (Czech Republic) Jiří Novák (Czech Republic) Petr Pála
- Score: 5–1, retired

Details
- Draw: 16 (1 Alt / 2 WC )
- Seeds: 4

Events
Singles	men	women
Doubles	men	women
- Japan Open

Justin Gimelstob and Nicolas Kiefer were the defending champions, but Kiefer did not compete this year. Gimelstob teamed up with Ashley Fisher and lost in quarterfinals to Yves Allegro and Michael Kohlmann.

Jared Palmer and Pavel Vízner won the title by defeating Jiří Novák and Petr Pála. Palmer and Vízner were leading 5–1 in the first set until Novák was forced to retire due to a rib injury.

== Seeds ==
1. (Australia) Wayne Arthurs / (Australia) Paul Hanley (quarterfinals)
2. (United States) Jared Palmer / (Czech Republic) Pavel Vízner (champions)
3. (Switzerland) Yves Allegro / (Germany) Michael Kohlmann (semifinals)
4. (Czech Republic) Jiří Novák / (Czech Republic) Petr Pála (final, retired due to a rib injury on Novák)

== Draw ==
Key

- Q = Qualifier
- WC = Wild card
- LL = Lucky loser
- Alt = Alternate
- ITF = ITF entry
- PR = Protected ranking
- SR = Special ranking
- SE = Special exempt
- JE = Junior exempt
- JR = Junior Accelerator Programme entrant
- CO = College Accelerator Programme entrant
- NG = Next Gen Accelerator Program entrant
- w/o = Walkover
- r = Retired
- d = Defaulted

=== Draw ===
First round
1	(Australia) W Arthurs (Australia) P Hanley	7	6
(South Africa) R Koenig (United States) T Parrott	5	2
(Finland) J Nieminen (United States) G Oliver	6	6
(Brazil) R Mello (United States) J Thomas	4	4
4	(Czech Republic) J Novák (Czech Republic) P Pála	6	6
(United States) JM Gambill (United States) S Humphries	2	4
WC	(Japan) T Shimada (Japan) T Suzuki	6	3	4
(South Africa) J Coetzee (South Africa) C Haggard	4	6	6
(Australia) A Fisher (United States) J Gimelstob	7^{10}	7
Alt	(Switzerland) M Chiudinelli (Austria) A Peya	6^{8}	5
WC	(Japan) G Motomura (Japan) T Terachi	4	6^{5}
3	(Switzerland) Y Allegro (Germany) M Kohlmann	6	7^{7}
(Argentina) M García (Argentina) S Prieto	7	5	6
(United States) R Leach (United States) B MacPhie	5	7	2
(Sweden) S Aspelin (Australia) J Kerr	2	6	6^{4}
2	(United States) J Palmer (Czech Republic) P Vízner	6	3	7^{7}

Quarterfinals
1	(Australia) W Arthurs (Australia) P Hanley	6^{7}	4
(Finland) J Nieminen (United States) G Oliver	7^{9}	6
4	(Czech Republic) J Novák (Czech Republic) P Pála	6	6
(South Africa) J Coetzee (South Africa) C Haggard	3	4
(Australia) A Fisher (United States) J Gimelstob	3	4
3	(Switzerland) Y Allegro (Germany) M Kohlmann	6	6
(Argentina) M García (Argentina) S Prieto	7^{7}	3	4
2	(United States) J Palmer (Czech Republic) P Vízner	6^{2}	6	6

Semifinals
(Finland) J Nieminen (United States) G Oliver	6^{3}	6	3
4	(Czech Republic) J Novák (Czech Republic) P Pála	7^{7}	3	6
3	(Switzerland) Y Allegro (Germany) M Kohlmann	6^{3}	7^{7}	5
2	(United States) J Palmer (Czech Republic) P Vízner	7^{7}	6^{5}	7

Final
4	(Czech Republic) J Novák (Czech Republic) P Pála	1^{r}
2	(United States) J Palmer (Czech Republic) P Vízner	5
