= 2003 AIG Japan Open Tennis Championships – Men's doubles =

2003 tennis tournament held in Japan

Men's doubles
- 2003 AIG Japan Open Tennis Championships

Final
- Champions: (United States) Justin Gimelstob (Germany) Nicolas Kiefer
- Runners-up: (United States) Scott Humphries (The Bahamas) Mark Merklein
- Score: 6–7^{(6–8)}, 6–3, 7–6^{(7–4)}

Details
- Draw: 16 (2WC)
- Seeds: 4

Events
Singles	men	women
Doubles	men	women
- AIG Japan Open Tennis Championships

Jeff Coetzee and Chris Haggard were the defending champions but lost in the first round to Jiří Novák and Petr Pála.

Justin Gimelstob and Nicolas Kiefer won in the final 6–7^{(6–8)}, 6–3, 7–6^{(7–4)} against Scott Humphries and Mark Merklein.

== Seeds ==
1. (Australia) Wayne Arthurs / (Australia) Paul Hanley (first round)
2. (South Africa) Jeff Coetzee / (South Africa) Chris Haggard (first round)
3. (United States) Rick Leach / (United States) Brian MacPhie (quarterfinals)
4. (Israel) Jonathan Erlich / (Israel) Andy Ram (first round)

== Draw ==
Key

- Q = Qualifier
- WC = Wild card
- LL = Lucky loser
- Alt = Alternate
- ITF = ITF entry
- PR = Protected ranking
- SR = Special ranking
- SE = Special exempt
- JE = Junior exempt
- JR = Junior Accelerator Programme entrant
- CO = College Accelerator Programme entrant
- NG = Next Gen Accelerator Program entrant
- w/o = Walkover
- r = Retired
- d = Defaulted

First round
1	(Australia) W Arthurs (Australia) P Hanley	4	4
WC	(Japan) S Iwabuchi (Japan) J Kato	6	6
(United States) J-M Gambill (United States) B Vahaly	6^{3}	6^{5}
(Switzerland) Y Allegro (Czech Republic) P Luxa	7^{7}	7^{7}
4	(Israel) J Erlich (Israel) A Ram	1	6	6^{11}
(Australia) T Perry (United States) J Thomas	6	4	7^{13}
(United States) J Gimelstob (Germany) N Kiefer	6	7
(Australia) A Kratzmann (Netherlands) J van Lottum	2	5
(Germany) L Burgsmüller (Germany) R Schüttler	3	4
(United States) S Humphries (The Bahamas) M Merklein	6	6
(Australia) J Kerr (South Africa) M Wakefield	4	6	3
3	(United States) R Leach (United States) B MacPhie	6	3	6
(Argentina) M García (United States) G Oliver	6	5	7^{7}
WC	(Japan) T Shimada (Japan) T Suzuki	4	7	6^{3}
(Czech Republic) J Novák (Czech Republic) P Pála	6	7
2	(South Africa) J Coetzee (South Africa) C Haggard	2	5

Quarterfinals
WC	(Japan) S Iwabuchi (Japan) J Kato	6	6
(Switzerland) Y Allegro (Czech Republic) P Luxa	2	2
(Australia) T Perry (United States) J Thomas	4	3
(United States) J Gimelstob (Germany) N Kiefer	6	6
(United States) S Humphries (The Bahamas) M Merklein	6	7^{7}
3	(United States) R Leach (United States) B MacPhie	3	6^{3}
(Argentina) M García (United States) G Oliver	4	1
(Czech Republic) J Novák (Czech Republic) P Pála	6	6

Semifinals
WC	(Japan) S Iwabuchi (Japan) J Kato	3	4
(United States) J Gimelstob (Germany) N Kiefer	6	6
(United States) S Humphries (The Bahamas) M Merklein	2	6	6
(Czech Republic) J Novák (Czech Republic) P Pála	6	2	3

Final
(United States) J Gimelstob (Germany) N Kiefer	6^{6}	6	7^{7}
(United States) S Humphries (The Bahamas) M Merklein	7^{8}	3	6^{4}
