= 2003 AIG Japan Open Tennis Championships – Women's doubles =

Women's doubles
- 2003 AIG Japan Open Tennis Championships

Final
- Champions: (Russia) Maria Sharapova (Thailand) Tamarine Tanasugarn
- Runners-up: (United States) Ansley Cargill (United States) Ashley Harkleroad
- Score: 7–6^{(7–1)}, 6–0

Details
- Draw: 16 (1Q)
- Seeds: 4

Events
Singles	men	women
Doubles	men	women
- Japan Open

Shinobu Asagoe and Nana Miyagi were the defending champions, but lost in quarterfinals to Yan Zi and Zheng Jie.

Maria Sharapova and Tamarine Tanasugarn won the title by defeating Ansley Cargill and Ashley Harkleroad 7–6^{(7–1)}, 6–0 in the final.

This tournament saw an unusual event, as all seeded pairs were eliminated in quarterfinals.

== Seeds ==
1. (Chinese Taipei) Janet Lee / (Indonesia) Angelique Widjaja (quarterfinals)
2. (Slovenia) Tina Križan / (Slovenia) Katarina Srebotnik (quarterfinals)
3. (Japan) Shinobu Asagoe / (Japan) Nana Miyagi (quarterfinals)
4. (Japan) Rika Fujiwara / (Switzerland) Emmanuelle Gagliardi (quarterfinals, withdrew due to a wrist injury on Fujiwara)

== Draw ==
Key

- Q = Qualifier
- WC = Wild card
- LL = Lucky loser
- Alt = Alternate
- ITF = ITF entry
- PR = Protected ranking
- SR = Special ranking
- SE = Special exempt
- JE = Junior exempt
- JR = Junior Accelerator Programme entrant
- CO = College Accelerator Programme entrant
- NG = Next Gen Accelerator Program entrant
- w/o = Walkover
- r = Retired
- d = Defaulted

=== Draw ===
First round
1	(Chinese Taipei) J Lee (Indonesia) A Widjaja	6^{5}	6	6
(Japan) S Hisamatsu (Japan) Y Yoshida	7^{7}	4	4
(United States) A Cargill (United States) A Harkleroad	6	6
(Republic of Ireland) K Liggan (Spain) A Parra Santonja	4	4
4	(Japan) R Fujiwara (Switzerland) E Gagliardi	3	6	6
(Australia) E Dominikovic (Russia) M Kirilenko	6	3	2
(Australia) T Musgrave (United States) A Spears	7	6
(Japan) A Morigami (Japan) S Obata	5	4
(China) Z Yan (China) J Zheng	6	6
(United States) J Craybas (Croatia) S Talaja	4	3
(China) T Li (China) T Sun	2	6	2
3	(Japan) S Asagoe (Japan) N Miyagi	6	3	6
Q	(South Korea) K-m Chang (South Korea) J-h Kim	3	2
(Russia) M Sharapova (Thailand) T Tanasugarn	6	6
(South Korea) M-r Jeon (Italy) An Serra Zanetti	1	2
2	(Slovenia) T Križan (Slovenia) K Srebotnik	6	6

Quarterfinals
1	(Chinese Taipei) J Lee (Indonesia) A Widjaja	4	2
(United States) A Cargill (United States) A Harkleroad	6	6
4	(Japan) R Fujiwara (Switzerland) E Gagliardi
(Australia) T Musgrave (United States) A Spears	w/o
(China) Z Yan (China) J Zheng	6	7
3	(Japan) S Asagoe (Japan) N Miyagi	3	5
(Russia) M Sharapova (Thailand) T Tanasugarn	7^{7}	4	6
2	(Slovenia) T Križan (Slovenia) K Srebotnik	6^{5}	6	1

Semifinals
(United States) A Cargill (United States) A Harkleroad	6	6
(Australia) T Musgrave (United States) A Spears	1	1
(China) Z Yan (China) J Zheng	3	7	6^{6}
(Russia) M Sharapova (Thailand) T Tanasugarn	6	5	7^{8}

Final
(United States) A Cargill (United States) A Harkleroad	6^{1}	0
(Russia) M Sharapova (Thailand) T Tanasugarn	7^{7}	6
