= 2004 AIG Japan Open Tennis Championships – Women's singles =

Women's singles
- 2004 AIG Japan Open Tennis Championships

Final
- Champion: (Russia) Maria Sharapova
- Runner-up: (United States) Mashona Washington
- Score: 6–0, 6–1

Details
- Draw: 30 (4Q / 2WC)
- Seeds: 8

Events
Singles	men	women
Doubles	men	women
- Japan Open

Maria Sharapova was the defending champion and successfully defender her title, by defeating Mashona Washington 6–0, 6–1 in the final.

== Seeds ==
The first two seeds received a bye into the second round.

1. (Russia) Maria Sharapova (champion)
2. (France) Tatiana Golovin (second round)
3. (Japan) Shinobu Asagoe (first round)
4. (Puerto Rico) Kristina Brandi (second round)
5. (United States) Meghann Shaughnessy (first round)
6. (Australia) Nicole Pratt (first round)
7. (Czech Republic) Klára Koukalová (semifinals)
8. (Spain) Arantxa Parra Santonja (first round)

== Draw ==
Key

- Q = Qualifier
- WC = Wild card
- LL = Lucky loser
- Alt = Alternate
- ITF = ITF entry
- PR = Protected ranking
- SR = Special ranking
- SE = Special exempt
- JE = Junior exempt
- JR = Junior Accelerator Programme entrant
- CO = College Accelerator Programme entrant
- NG = Next Gen Accelerator Program entrant
- w/o = Walkover
- r = Retired
- d = Defaulted

=== Finals ===
Semifinals
1	(Russia) Maria Sharapova	6	6
(Thailand) Tamarine Tanasugarn	2	3
(United States) Mashona Washington	3	7	6
7	(Czech Republic) Klára Koukalová	6	5	2

Final
1	(Russia) Maria Sharapova	6	6
(United States) Mashona Washington	0	1

=== Top half ===
First round
(Japan) A Nakamura	3	5
Q	(Australia) S Stosur	6	7
(Slovenia) K Srebotnik	5	0
(Japan) A Morigami	7	6
Q	(France) Y Fedossova	7	7^{7}
5	(United States) M Shaughnessy	5	6^{5}
3	(Japan) S Asagoe	0	4
(Thailand) T Tanasugarn	6	6
(Czech Republic) B Strýcová	5	6	4
(United States) J Craybas	7	4	6
Q	(Israel) S Pe'er	6	0	2
(Hungary) A Kapros	2	6	6
Q	(Bulgaria) S Karatantcheva	6	6
8	(Spain) A Parra Santonja	2	4

Second round
1	(Russia) M Sharapova	6	1	6
Q	(Australia) S Stosur	4	6	3
(Japan) A Morigami	3	6^{7}
Q	(France) Y Fedossova	6	7^{9}
(Thailand) T Tanasugarn	6	7^{7}
(United States) J Craybas	3	6^{2}
(Hungary) A Kapros	6	6
Q	(Bulgaria) S Karatantcheva	4	0

Quarterfinals
1	(Russia) M Sharapova	6	6
Q	(France) Y Fedossova	3	4
(Thailand) T Tanasugarn	6	3
(Hungary) A Kapros	1	0^{r}

Semifinals
1	(Russia) M Sharapova	6	6
(Thailand) T Tanasugarn	2	3

=== Bottom half ===
First round
6	(Australia) N Pratt	0	6	4
(Russia) E Linetskaya	6	1	6
WC	(Japan) R Fujiwara	6	6
(Japan) S Obata	4	4
(Spain) M Sánchez Lorenzo	2	4
(United States) M Washington	6	6
(Czech Republic) S Kleinová	6	3	4
4	(Puerto Rico) K Brandi	4	6	6
7	(Czech Republic) K Koukalová	6	6
(Venezuela) M Sequera	2	2
(Slovakia) Ľ Kurhajcová	7^{7}	6
(Russia) A Jidkova	6^{5}	2
(South Korea) Y-j Cho	3	4
WC	(Czech Republic) N Vaidišová	6	6

Second round
(Russia) E Linetskaya	6	7
WC	(Japan) R Fujiwara	4	5
(United States) M Washington	6	6
4	(Puerto Rico) K Brandi	2	2
7	(Czech Republic) K Koukalová	6	6
(Slovakia) Ľ Kurhajcová	2	4
WC	(Czech Republic) N Vaidišová	6	3	6
2	(France) T Golovin	4	6	4

Quarterfinals
(Russia) E Linetskaya	2	1
(United States) M Washington	6	6
7	(Czech Republic) K Koukalová	6	6
WC	(Czech Republic) N Vaidišová	3	0

Semifinals
(United States) M Washington	3	7	6
7	(Czech Republic) K Koukalová	6	5	2
