= 2006 China Open – Men's singles =

Men's singles
- 2006 China Open

Final
- Champion: (Cyprus) Marcos Baghdatis
- Runner-up: (Croatia) Mario Ančić
- Score: 6–4, 6–0

Events
Singles	men	women
Doubles	men	women
← 2005 ·	China Open	· 2007 →

Rafael Nadal was the defending champion, but did not participate this year.

Marcos Baghdatis won the title, beating Mario Ančić 6–4, 6–0 in the final.

== Seeds ==
1. (Croatia) Ivan Ljubičić (quarterfinals)
2. (Russia) Nikolay Davydenko (quarterfinals, retired because of a virus, dizziness)
3. (Cyprus) Marcos Baghdatis (champion)
4. (Croatia) Mario Ančić (final)
5. (Slovakia) Dominik Hrbatý (quarterfinals)
6. (Thailand) Paradorn Srichaphan (semifinals)
7. (Croatia) Ivo Karlović (second round, retired because of a left knee injury)
8. (South Korea) Lee Hyung-taik (semifinals)

== Draw ==
=== Key ===
- Q = Qualifier
- WC = Wild card
- LL = Lucky loser
- Alt = Alternate
- SE = Special exempt
- PR = Protected ranking
- ITF = ITF entry
- JE = Junior exempt
- w/o = Walkover
- r = Retired
- d = Defaulted
- SR = Special ranking

=== Finals ===
Semifinals
8	(South Korea) Lee Hyung-taik	6	1	1
4	(Croatia) Mario Ančić	4	6	6
3/WC	(Cyprus) Marcos Baghdatis	6	3	7
6	(Thailand) Paradorn Srichaphan	2	6	5

Final
4	(Croatia) Mario Ančić	4	0
3/WC	(Cyprus) Marcos Baghdatis	6	6

=== Top half ===
First round
1	(Croatia) I Ljubičić	6	6
(Japan) G Soeda	4	2
(Denmark) K Pless	2	4
(United States) K Kim	6	6
(Germany) M Berrer	7	6
Q	(Japan) G Motomura	5	4
(Russia) I Kunitsyn	3	4
8	(South Korea) H-t Lee	6	6
4	(Croatia) M Ančić	6	3	6
(Spain) F López	3	6	3
(Chinese Taipei) Y-h Lu	3	6^{4}
(Italy) S Galvani	6	7^{7}
(Paraguay) R Delgado	4	2
(Austria) A Peya	6	6
(South Africa) R de Voest	1	0
5	(Slovakia) D Hrbatý	6	6

Second round
1	(Croatia) I Ljubičić	6	6
(United States) K Kim	3	4
(Germany) M Berrer	6	6^{4}	6^{4}
8	(South Korea) H-t Lee	4	7^{7}	7^{7}
4	(Croatia) M Ančić	6	7
(Italy) S Galvani	3	5
(Austria) A Peya	1	6	0
5	(Slovakia) D Hrbatý	6	2	6

Quarterfinals
1	(Croatia) I Ljubičić	3	6^{3}
8	(South Korea) H-t Lee	6	7^{7}
4	(Croatia) M Ančić	2	7^{7}	6
5	(Slovakia) D Hrbatý	6	6^{4}	4

Semifinals
8	(South Korea) H-t Lee	6	1	1
4	(Croatia) M Ančić	4	6	6

=== Bottom half ===
First round
7	(Croatia) I Karlović	6	7^{7}
Q	(Russia) M Ledovskikh	2	6^{2}
(Switzerland) M Chiudinelli	6	2	3
(Thailand) D Udomchoke	0	6	6
(Chinese Taipei) Y-t Wang	6	6
WC	(China) X-y Yu	1	4
(Germany) D Gremelmayr	6	1	6^{5}
3/WC	(Cyprus) M Baghdatis	4	6	7^{7}
6	(Thailand) P Srichaphan	6	6
(Germany) R Schüttler	3	3
(Australia) N Healey	1	6^{5}
Q	(Japan) S Iwabuchi	6	7^{7}
WC	(China) Y Wang	6^{6}	3
Q	(Slovenia) L Gregorc	7^{8}	6
(Denmark) K Carlsen	3	4
2	(Russia) N Davydenko	6	6

Second round
7	(Croatia) I Karlović	2	1^{r}
(Thailand) D Udomchoke	6	3
(Chinese Taipei) Y-t Wang	6^{4}	4
3/WC	(Cyprus) M Baghdatis	7^{7}	6
6	(Thailand) P Srichaphan	6	6
Q	(Japan) S Iwabuchi	3	1
Q	(Slovenia) L Gregorc	6^{2}	2
2	(Russia) N Davydenko	7^{7}	6

Quarterfinals
(Thailand) D Udomchoke	2	1
3/WC	(Cyprus) M Baghdatis	6	6
6	(Thailand) P Srichaphan	6	1
2	(Russia) N Davydenko	2	0^{r}

Semifinals
3/WC	(Cyprus) M Baghdatis	6	3	7
6	(Thailand) P Srichaphan	2	6	5
