= 2007 China Open =

2007 China Open can refer to:

- 2007 China Open (tennis), a tennis tournament
- 2007 China Open Super Series, a badminton tournament
- China Open 2007 (snooker), a snooker tournament
