= 2005 Maria Sharapova tennis season =

- Full name: Maria Sharapova
- Country: Russia

Singles
- Calendar titles: 3
- Year-end ranking: No. 4
- Ranking change from previous year: N/A

Grand Slam & significant results
- Australian Open: SF
- French Open: QF
- Wimbledon: SF
- US Open: SF
- Last updated on: 27 September 2015.

Results and statistics from Maria Sharapova's 2005 tennis season.

== Yearly summary ==
=== Australian Open series ===
Sharapova began her season at the Australian Open, as the fourth seed. She reached the semi-finals, defeating Grand Slam debutant Li Na and the previous year's US Open champion Svetlana Kuznetsova en route, before being defeated in the semi-finals by eventual champion Serena Williams in an epic three set thriller on Rod Laver. Sharapova, had several match points in the final set, but ended up losing it 6–8.

=== Indian Wells & Miami ===
Sharapova reached the semi-finals at Indian Wells for the first time, but she would suffer the ignominy of a double bagel defeat, failing to win a single game against Lindsay Davenport. This would turn out to be Sharapova's only career defeat against Davenport. She fared much better in Miami though, beating the likes of Justine Henin-Hardenne and Venus Williams en route to the final. In the final, she lost in straight sets to Kim Clijsters.

=== European clay court season ===
Sharapova first clay event of the season was the Berlin Open where she was the first seed. She lost in straight sets in the quarters, to eventual champion Justine Henin-Hardenne. Her next tournament was the Internazionali B.N.L D'Italia Open. She lost in the semifinals to Swiss Patty Schnyder, in three sets after winning the first set. Her final clay tournament of the year was the French Open where she reached the quarterfinals. In the quarters she lost to Justine Henin-Hardenne, for the second and final time in the season.

=== Grass court season ===
Sharapova successfully defended her title in Birmingham, defeating future rivals Samantha Stosur and Tatiana Golovin, before defeating, future world number one, Jelena Janković in a three set final.

As the defending champion at Wimbledon, Sharapova navigated her way through to the semi-finals without the loss of a set (and serve, with the exception of her third round victory against Katarina Srebotnik), before being defeated by eventual champion Venus Williams; the defeat ending a 22-match winning streak on grass dating back to the 2003 Wimbledon 4th Round.

=== US Open series ===
A week before the start of the US Open, Sharapova claimed the World No. 1 ranking for the first time, succeeding Lindsay Davenport. Subsequently, she was named top seed at a Major tournament for the first time, at the US Open, where she reached the semi-finals to complete the feat of having reached at least the quarter-final stage at each of the four Majors.

Sharapova won her first four matches for the loss of just 12 games, before being sternly tested by compatriot Nadia Petrova in the quarter-finals, before winning in three sets. In the semi-finals, she lost to eventual champion Kim Clijsters in three sets. This marked the fourth consecutive Major tournament in which Sharapova was defeated by the eventual champion. Despite this defeat, Sharapova reclaimed the World No. 1 ranking following the tournament, having improved from her third round showing from 2004.

=== Fall series ===
Sharapova's first of two fall tournaments was the 2005 Beijing Open. She had a lot of points here, after making it to the semifinals last year falling to compatriot Svetlana Kuznetsova. She won her first match in a rollercoaster three setter, 6–0, 5–7, 6–2. Then she won her second round easily, in straight sets. In her semifinal match versus Maria Kirilenko, she had to retire the match due to injury.

Sharapova's Next tournament was the Kremlin Cup in Moscow. In her opening round match versus Anna-Lena Grönefeld, she was up 6–1, 4–2, when Grönefeld had to retire the match due to injury. Her next match was versus fellow Russian and future World No.1, Dinara Safina. Sharapova lost after taking the first set 6–1. This was her first loss after winning the opening set since May.

=== WTA Tour Championships ===
Sharapova qualified for the year-end WTA Tour Championships for the second year in a row, having picked up three titles during the season. She was drawn in the Green Group along with Lindsay Davenport, Patty Schnyder and Nadia Petrova. Sharapova won two of her three matches, the only loss coming to Petrova in the last match. Sharapova qualified for the semi-finals after finishing first in her group; thus, the semi-final saw her drawn against Amélie Mauresmo, in which she was defeated in straight sets, bringing an end to her 2005 season.

== All matches ==
This table chronicles all the matches of Sharapova in 2005, including walkovers (W/O) which the WTA does not count as wins. They are marked ND for non-decision or no decision.

Key
W	F	SF	QF	#R	RR	Q#	P#	DNQ	A	Z#	PO	G	S	B	NMS	NTI	P	NH

(W) winner; (F) finalist; (SF) semifinalist; (QF) quarterfinalist; (#R) rounds 4, 3, 2, 1; (RR) round-robin stage; (Q#) qualification round; (P#) preliminary round; (DNQ) did not qualify; (A) absent; (Z#) Davis/Fed Cup Zonal Group (with number indication) or (PO) play-off; (G) gold, (S) silver or (B) bronze Olympic/Paralympic medal; (NMS) not a Masters tournament; (NTI) not a Tier I tournament; (P) postponed; (NH) not held; (SR) strike rate (events won / competed); (W–L) win–loss record.
To avoid confusion and double counting, these charts are updated at the conclusion of a tournament or when the player's participation has ended.

=== Singles matches (Grand Slams and Premier 5) ===
Tournament	#	Round	Opponent	Result	Score
Australian Open; Melbourne, Australia; Grand Slam; Hard, outdoor 17–30 January 2005
Australian Open; Melbourne, Australia; Grand Slam; Hard, outdoor 17–30 January 2005	1	1R	(Bulgaria) Sesil Karatantcheva	Win	6–3, 6–1
Australian Open; Melbourne, Australia; Grand Slam; Hard, outdoor 17–30 January 2005	2	2R	(United States) Lindsay Lee-Waters	Win	4–6, 6–0, 6–3
Australian Open; Melbourne, Australia; Grand Slam; Hard, outdoor 17–30 January 2005	3	3R	(China) Li Na	Win	6–0, 6–2
Australian Open; Melbourne, Australia; Grand Slam; Hard, outdoor 17–30 January 2005	4	4R	(Italy) Silvia Farina Elia	Win	4–6, 6–1, 6–2
Australian Open; Melbourne, Australia; Grand Slam; Hard, outdoor 17–30 January 2005	5	QF	(Russia) Svetlana Kuznetsova	Win	4–6, 6–2, 6–2
Australian Open; Melbourne, Australia; Grand Slam; Hard, outdoor 17–30 January 2005	6	SF	(United States) Serena Williams	Loss	6–2, 5–7, 6–8
Pacific Life Open; Indian Wells, United States of America; Tier I Hard, outdoor 14–20 March 2005
Pacific Life Open; Indian Wells, United States of America; Tier I Hard, outdoor 14–20 March 2005		1R	Bye		
Pacific Life Open; Indian Wells, United States of America; Tier I Hard, outdoor 14–20 March 2005		2R	(United States) Angela Haynes	Win	6–1, 6–2
Pacific Life Open; Indian Wells, United States of America; Tier I Hard, outdoor 14–20 March 2005		3R	(Russia) Dinara Safina	Win	6–2, 6–3
Pacific Life Open; Indian Wells, United States of America; Tier I Hard, outdoor 14–20 March 2005		4R	(Colombia) Fabiola Zuluaga	Win	4–6, 6–4, 7–5
Pacific Life Open; Indian Wells, United States of America; Tier I Hard, outdoor 14–20 March 2005		QF	(France) Mary Pierce	Win	6–4, 6–3
Pacific Life Open; Indian Wells, United States of America; Tier I Hard, outdoor 14–20 March 2005		SF	(United States) Lindsay Davenport	Loss	0–6, 0–6
NASDAQ-100 Open; Miami, United States of America; Tier I Hard, outdoor 21 March–3 April 2005
NASDAQ-100 Open; Miami, United States of America; Tier I Hard, outdoor 21 March–3 April 2005		1R	Bye		
NASDAQ-100 Open; Miami, United States of America; Tier I Hard, outdoor 21 March–3 April 2005		2R	(Greece) Eleni Daniilidou	Win	6–0, 6–4
NASDAQ-100 Open; Miami, United States of America; Tier I Hard, outdoor 21 March–3 April 2005		3R	(United States) Marissa Irvin	Win	6–2, 6–0
NASDAQ-100 Open; Miami, United States of America; Tier I Hard, outdoor 21 March–3 April 2005		4R	(Japan) Shinobu Asagoe	Win	6–1, 6–2
NASDAQ-100 Open; Miami, United States of America; Tier I Hard, outdoor 21 March–3 April 2005		QF	(Belgium) Justine Henin-Hardenne	Win	6–1, 6–7^{(6–8)}, 6–2
NASDAQ-100 Open; Miami, United States of America; Tier I Hard, outdoor 21 March–3 April 2005		SF	(United States) Venus Williams	Win	6–4, 6–3
NASDAQ-100 Open; Miami, United States of America; Tier I Hard, outdoor 21 March–3 April 2005		F	(Belgium) Kim Clijsters	Loss (1)	3–6, 5–7
French Open; Paris, France; Grand Slam; Clay, outdoor 23 May–5 June 2005
French Open; Paris, France; Grand Slam; Clay, outdoor 23 May–5 June 2005		1R	(Russia) Evgenia Linetskaya	Win	6–7^{(3–7)}, 6–2, 6–4
French Open; Paris, France; Grand Slam; Clay, outdoor 23 May–5 June 2005		2R	(France) Aravane Rezaï	Win	6–3, 6–2
French Open; Paris, France; Grand Slam; Clay, outdoor 23 May–5 June 2005		3R	(Russia) Anna Chakvetadze	Win	6–1, 6–4
French Open; Paris, France; Grand Slam; Clay, outdoor 23 May–5 June 2005		4R	(Spain) Nuria Llagostera Vives	Win	6–2, 6–3
French Open; Paris, France; Grand Slam; Clay, outdoor 23 May–5 June 2005		QF	(Belgium) Justine Henin-Hardenne	Loss	4–6, 2–6
Wimbledon; London, Great Britain; Grand Slam; Grass, outdoor 20 June–3 July 2005
Wimbledon; London, Great Britain; Grand Slam; Grass, outdoor 20 June–3 July 2005		1R	(Spain) Nuria Llagostera Vives	Win	6–2, 6–2
Wimbledon; London, Great Britain; Grand Slam; Grass, outdoor 20 June–3 July 2005		2R	(Bulgaria) Sesil Karatantcheva	Win	6–0, 6–1
Wimbledon; London, Great Britain; Grand Slam; Grass, outdoor 20 June–3 July 2005		3R	(Slovenia) Katarina Srebotnik	Win	6–2, 6–4
Wimbledon; London, Great Britain; Grand Slam; Grass, outdoor 20 June–3 July 2005		4R	(France) Nathalie Dechy	Win	6–4, 6–2
Wimbledon; London, Great Britain; Grand Slam; Grass, outdoor 20 June–3 July 2005		QF	(Russia) Nadia Petrova	Win	7–6^{(8–6)}, 6–3
Wimbledon; London, Great Britain; Grand Slam; Grass, outdoor 20 June–3 July 2005		SF	(United States) Venus Williams	Loss	6–7^{(2–7)}, 1–6
US Open; New York City, United States of America; Grand Slam; Hard, outdoor 29 August–11 September 2005
US Open; New York City, United States of America; Grand Slam; Hard, outdoor 29 August–11 September 2005		1R	(Greece) Eleni Daniilidou	Win	6–1, 6–1
US Open; New York City, United States of America; Grand Slam; Hard, outdoor 29 August–11 September 2005		2R	(Madagascar) Dally Randriantefy	Win	6–1, 6–0
US Open; New York City, United States of America; Grand Slam; Hard, outdoor 29 August–11 September 2005		3R	(Germany) Julia Schruff	Win	6–2, 6–4
US Open; New York City, United States of America; Grand Slam; Hard, outdoor 29 August–11 September 2005		4R	(India) Sania Mirza	Win	6–2, 6–1
US Open; New York City, United States of America; Grand Slam; Hard, outdoor 29 August–11 September 2005		QF	(Russia) Nadia Petrova	Win	7–5, 4–6, 6–4
US Open; New York City, United States of America; Grand Slam; Hard, outdoor 29 August–11 September 2005		SF	(Belgium) Kim Clijsters	Loss	2–6, 7–6^{(7–4)}, 3–6
China Open; Beijing, China; Tier II; Hard, outdoor 19–25 September 2005
China Open; Beijing, China; Tier II; Hard, outdoor 19–25 September 2005		1R	Bye		
China Open; Beijing, China; Tier II; Hard, outdoor 19–25 September 2005		2R	(Israel) Shahar Pe'er	Win	6–0, 5–7, 6–2
China Open; Beijing, China; Tier II; Hard, outdoor 19–25 September 2005		QF	(Japan) Shinobu Asagoe	Win	6–4, 6–1
China Open; Beijing, China; Tier II; Hard, outdoor 19–25 September 2005		SF	(Russia) Maria Kirilenko	Loss	4–6, 1–2 RET
WTA Tour Championships; Los Angeles, United States of America; WTA Tour Championships; Hard, indoor 7–13 November 2005
WTA Tour Championships; Los Angeles, United States of America; WTA Tour Championships; Hard, indoor 7–13 November 2005		RR	(United States) Lindsay Davenport	Win	6–3, 5–7, 6–4
WTA Tour Championships; Los Angeles, United States of America; WTA Tour Championships; Hard, indoor 7–13 November 2005		RR	(Switzerland) Patty Schnyder	Win	6–1, 3–6, 6–3
WTA Tour Championships; Los Angeles, United States of America; WTA Tour Championships; Hard, indoor 7–13 November 2005		RR	(Russia) Nadia Petrova	Loss	1–6, 2–6
WTA Tour Championships; Los Angeles, United States of America; WTA Tour Championships; Hard, indoor 7–13 November 2005		SF	(France) Amélie Mauresmo	Loss	6–7^{(1–7)}, 3–6

== Tournament schedule ==
=== Singles Schedule ===
Date	Championship	Location	Category	Surface	Prev. result	New result	Outcome
17 January 2005– 30 January 2005	Australian Open	Melbourne (AUS)	Grand Slam tournament	Hard	3R	SF	Lost in the semi-finals against Serena Williams
7 March 2005– 20 March 2005	Pacific Life Open	Indian Wells (USA)	Tier I	Hard	4R	SF	Lost in the semi-finals against Lindsay Davenport
21 March 2005– 3 April 2005	NASDAQ-100 Open	Miami (USA)	Tier I	Hard	4R	F	Lost in the final against Kim Clijsters
23 May 2005– 5 June 2005	French Open	Paris (FRA)	Grand Slam tournament	Clay	QF	QF	Lost in the quarterfinals against Justine Henin-Hardenne
20 June 2005– 3 July 2005	The Championships, Wimbledon	London (GBR)	Grand Slam tournament	Grass	W	SF	Lost in the semi-finals against Venus Williams
29 August 2005– 11 September 2005	US Open	New York (USA)	Grand Slam tournament	Hard	3R	SF	Lost in the semi-finals against Kim Clijsters
19 September 2005– 25 September 2005	China Open	Beijing (CHN)	Tier II	Hard	SF	SF	Retired in the semi-finals against Maria Kirilenko
7 November 2005– 13 November 2005	WTA Tour Championships	Los Angeles (USA)	WTA Tour Championships	Hard	W	SF	Lost in the semi-finals against Amélie Mauresmo

== Yearly Records ==
=== Head-to-head matchups ===
Maria Sharapova vs. Justine Henin-Hardenne 1-2

Maria Sharapova vs. Venus Williams 1-1

Maria Sharapova vs. Lindsay Davenport 2-1

Maria Sharapova vs. Maria Kirilenko 1-1

Maria Sharapova vs. Kim Clijsters 0-2

Maria Sharapova vs. Serena Williams 0-1

=== Finals ===
==== Singles: 4 (3–1) ====
Category WTA Tier I (1–1) WTA Tier II (1–0) WTA Tier III (1–0)	Titles by surface Hard (1–1) Grass (1–0) Carpet (1–0)	Titles by conditions Outdoors (2–1) Indoors (1–0)

Outcome	No.	Date	Championship	Surface	Opponent in the final	Score in the final
Winner	8.	February 5, 2005	Tokyo, Japan (1)	Carpet (i)	(United States) Lindsay Davenport	6–1, 3–6, 7–6^{(7–5)}
Winner	9.	February 27, 2005	Doha, Qatar (1)	Hard	(Australia) Alicia Molik	4–6, 6–1, 6–4
Runner-up	2.	April 2, 2005	(United States) Miami, USA (1)	Hard	(Belgium) Kim Clijsters	3–6, 5–7
Winner	10.	June 12, 2005	(United Kingdom) Birmingham, Great Britain (2)	Grass	(Serbia and Montenegro) Jelena Janković	6–2, 4–6, 6–1

== See also ==
- 2005 Serena Williams tennis season
- 2005 WTA Tour
