= 2006 China Open – Men's doubles =

Men's doubles
- 2006 China Open

Final
- Champions: (Croatia) Mario Ančić (India) Mahesh Bhupathi
- Runners-up: (Germany) Michael Berrer (Denmark) Kenneth Carlsen
- Score: 6–4, 6–3

Events
Singles	men	women
Doubles	men	women
← 2005 ·	China Open	· 2007 →

Justin Gimelstob and Nathan Healey were the defending champions, but Gimelstob did not participate this year. Healey partnered Ashley Fisher, losing in the first round.

Mario Ančić and Mahesh Bhupathi won the title, defeating Michael Berrer and Kenneth Carlsen 6–4, 6–3 in the final.

== Seeds ==
1. (Croatia) Ivo Karlović / (Netherlands) Rogier Wassen (quarterfinals, withdrew)
2. (Slovakia) Dominik Hrbatý / (Germany) Rainer Schüttler (first round)
3. (United States) Eric Butorac / (United States) Travis Parrott (quarterfinals)
4. (Australia) Ashley Fisher / (Australia) Nathan Healey (first round)

== Draw ==
Key

- Q = Qualifier
- WC = Wild card
- LL = Lucky loser
- Alt = Alternate
- ITF = ITF entry
- PR = Protected ranking
- SR = Special ranking
- SE = Special exempt
- JE = Junior exempt
- JR = Junior Accelerator Programme entrant
- CO = College Accelerator Programme entrant
- NG = Next Gen Accelerator Program entrant
- w/o = Walkover
- r = Retired
- d = Defaulted

=== Draw ===
First round
1	(Croatia) I Karlović (Netherlands) R Wassen	6	6
(Australia) J Kerr (United States) K Kim	2	2
(Denmark) K Pless (Thailand) D Udomchoke	6	6
(Germany) D Gremelmayr (Austria) A Peya	4	0
3	(United States) E Butorac (United States) T Parrott	6	6
(Thailand) Sa Ratiwatana (Thailand) So Ratiwatana	2	3
(Croatia) M Ančić (India) M Bhupathi	6	6
(South Korea) H-t Lee (Chinese Taipei) Y-t Wang	3	3
(Germany) M Berrer (Denmark) K Carlsen	6	6
(South Africa) R de Voest (Italy) S Galvani	3	4
(Russia) I Kunitsyn (Croatia) I Ljubičić	6	6
4	(Australia) A Fisher (Australia) N Healey	3	3
WC	(China) X-Y Yu (China) SX Zeng	6^{3}	7^{7}	[11]
(Paraguay) R Delgado (Chinese Taipei) Y-h Lu	7^{7}	6^{2}	[9]
WC	(China) Li Zhe (China) Y Wang	7^{7}	7
2	(Slovakia) D Hrbatý (Germany) R Schüttler	6^{5}	5

Quarterfinals
1	(Croatia) I Karlović (Netherlands) R Wassen
(Denmark) K Pless (Thailand) D Udomchoke	w/o
3	(United States) E Butorac (United States) T Parrott	6^{5}	6	[6]
(Croatia) M Ančić (India) M Bhupathi	7^{7}	3	[10]
(Germany) M Berrer (Denmark) K Carlsen	6	6
(Russia) I Kunitsyn (Croatia) I Ljubičić	4	1
WC	(China) X-Y Yu (China) SX Zeng	6	6
WC	(China) Li Zhe (China) Y Wang	3	1

Semifinals
(Denmark) K Pless (Thailand) D Udomchoke	1	2
(Croatia) M Ančić (India) M Bhupathi	6	6
(Germany) M Berrer (Denmark) K Carlsen	6	6
WC	(China) X-Y Yu (China) SX Zeng	3	4

Final
(Croatia) M Ančić (India) M Bhupathi	6	6
(Germany) M Berrer (Denmark) K Carlsen	4	3
