= 2006 China Open =

2006 China Open can refer to:

- 2006 China Open (tennis)
- 2006 China Open (snooker)
- 2006 China Open (badminton)
