= 2006 China Open – Women's singles =

Women's singles
- 2006 China Open

Final
- Champion: (Russia) Svetlana Kuznetsova
- Runner-up: (France) Amélie Mauresmo
- Score: 6–4, 6–0

Details
- Seeds: 8

Events
Singles	men	women
Doubles	men	women
← 2005 ·	China Open	· 2007 →

Maria Kirilenko was the defending champion but lost in the second round to Peng Shuai.

Svetlana Kuznetsova won the title by defeating Amélie Mauresmo 6–4, 6–0 in the final.

== Seeds ==
The top four seeds received a bye into the second round.

1. (France) Amélie Mauresmo (final)
2. (Russia) Svetlana Kuznetsova (champion)
3. (Russia) Nadia Petrova (quarterfinals)
4. (Czech Republic) Nicole Vaidišová (second round)
5. (United States) Lindsay Davenport (quarterfinals)
6. (Serbia and Montenegro) Jelena Janković (semifinals)
7. (China) Li Na (quarterfinals)
8. (Russia) Maria Kirilenko (second round)

== Draw ==
=== Key ===
- Q = Qualifier
- WC = Wild card
- LL = Lucky loser
- Alt = Alternate
- SE = Special exempt
- PR = Protected ranking
- ITF = ITF entry
- JE = Junior exempt
- w/o = Walkover
- r = Retired
- d = Defaulted
- SR = Special ranking

=== Finals ===
Semifinals
1	(France) Amélie Mauresmo	6	3	7^{7}
6	(Serbia and Montenegro) Jelena Janković	1	6	6^{3}
WC	(China) Peng Shuai	0	2
2	(Russia) Svetlana Kuznetsova	6	6

Final
1	(France) Amélie Mauresmo	4	0
2	(Russia) Svetlana Kuznetsova	6	6

=== Top half ===
First round
WC	(China) T Sun	6	1	6
(Russia) V Zvonareva	4	6	2
(United States) J Craybas	4	3
(China) J Zheng	6	6
(Russia) A Chakvetadze	6^{4}	6	5
5	(United States) L Davenport	7^{7}	3	7
(Sweden) S Arvidsson	4	1
Q	(Greece) E Daniilidou	6	6
(Spain) A Medina Garrigues	3	3
(France) M Bartoli	6	6
(Spain) L Domínguez Lino	0	1
6	(Serbia and Montenegro) J Janković	6	6

Second round
1	(France) A Mauresmo	6	6
WC	(China) T Sun	3	2
(China) J Zheng	2	6^{4}
5	(United States) L Davenport	6	7^{7}
3	(Russia) N Petrova	6	6
Q	(Greece) E Daniilidou	1	2
(France) M Bartoli	3	2
6	(Serbia and Montenegro) J Janković	6	6

Quarterfinals
1	(France) A Mauresmo	6	6
5	(United States) L Davenport	4	3
3	(Russia) N Petrova	4	6	2
6	(Serbia and Montenegro) J Janković	6	4	6

Semifinals
1	(France) A Mauresmo	6	3	7^{7}
6	(Serbia and Montenegro) J Janković	1	6	6^{3}

=== Bottom half ===
First round
8	(Russia) M Kirilenko	7^{8}	6
(Argentina) G Dulko	6^{6}	3
(Colombia) C Castaño	6	5	3
WC	(China) S Peng	4	7	6
(Japan) A Sugiyama	6	7^{7}
Q	(Australia) A Molik	2	6^{2}
7	(China) N Li	6	6
Q	(Russia) V Dushevina	3	4
(Russia) E Vesnina	7^{7}	5	6
(Finland) E Laine	6^{0}	7	3
Q	(Croatia) J Kostanić	7	6
WC	(China) Z Yan	5	2

Second round
8	(Russia) M Kirilenko	7	4	2
WC	(China) S Peng	5	6	6
(Japan) A Sugiyama	6	1	6
4	(Czech Republic) N Vaidišová	4	6	3
7	(China) N Li	3	6	6
(Russia) E Vesnina	6	1	1
Q	(Croatia) J Kostanić	1^{r}
2	(Russia) S Kuznetsova	2

Quarterfinals
WC	(China) S Peng	7^{7}	3	6
(Japan) A Sugiyama	6^{3}	6	2
7	(China) N Li	4	6	4
2	(Russia) S Kuznetsova	6	4	6

Semifinals
WC	(China) S Peng	0	2
2	(Russia) S Kuznetsova	6	6
