= 2006 China Open – Women's doubles =

Women's doubles
- 2006 China Open

Final
- Champions: (Spain) Virginia Ruano Pascual (Argentina) Paola Suárez
- Runners-up: (Russia) Anna Chakvetadze (Russia) Elena Vesnina
- Score: 6–2, 6–4

Events
Singles	men	women
Doubles	men	women
← 2005 ·	China Open	· 2007 →

Nuria Llagostera Vives and María Vento-Kabchi were the defending champions, but Llagostera Vives did not compete this year. Vento-Kabchi teamed up with Lourdes Domínguez Lino and lost in the first round to Séverine Brémond and Amélie Mauresmo.

Virginia Ruano Pascual and Paola Suárez won the title by defeating Anna Chakvetadze and Elena Vesnina 6–2, 6–4 in the final.

== Seeds ==
1. (China) Yan Zi / (China) Zheng Jie (first round)
2. (Spain) Virginia Ruano Pascual / (Argentina) Paola Suárez (champions)
3. (Greece) Eleni Daniilidou / (Spain) Anabel Medina Garrigues (first round)
4. (France) Marion Bartoli / (Argentina) Gisela Dulko (semifinals)

== Draw ==
=== Key ===
- Q = Qualifier
- WC = Wild card
- LL = Lucky loser
- Alt = Alternate
- SE = Special exempt
- PR = Protected ranking
- ITF = ITF entry
- JE = Junior exempt
- w/o = Walkover
- r = Retired
- d = Defaulted
- SR = Special ranking

=== Draw ===
First round
1	(China) Z Yan (China) J Zheng	6	3	3
(China) S Peng (Russia) V Zvonareva	4	6	6
(Russia) A Chakvetadze (Russia) E Vesnina	7	6
(Russia) V Dushevina (Belarus) A Yakimova	5	2
4	(France) M Bartoli (Argentina) G Dulko	0	6	6
(Serbia and Montenegro) J Janković (China) N Li	6	0	3
(United States) J Craybas (United States) M Tu	3	0
Q	(China) C Ji (China) S Sun	6	6
PR	(Australia) A Molik (Japan) A Sugiyama	6	6
(Poland) M Domachowska (Russia) M Kirilenko	3	2
(Finland) E Laine (Spain) MJ Martínez Sánchez	4	6	7
3	(Greece) E Daniilidou (Spain) A Medina Garrigues	6	1	5
WC	(France) S Brémond (France) A Mauresmo	6	6
(Spain) L Domínguez Lino (Venezuela) M Vento-Kabchi	4	3
WC/PR	(China) T Li (China) T Sun	6^{4}	5
2	(Spain) V Ruano Pascual (Argentina) P Suárez	7^{7}	7

Quarterfinals
(China) S Peng (Russia) V Zvonareva
(Russia) A Chakvetadze (Russia) E Vesnina	w/o
4	(France) M Bartoli (Argentina) G Dulko	6	7
Q	(China) C Ji (China) S Sun	3	5
PR	(Australia) A Molik (Japan) A Sugiyama	6	3	1
(Finland) E Laine (Spain) MJ Martínez Sánchez	2	6	6
WC	(France) S Brémond (France) A Mauresmo	3	2
2	(Spain) V Ruano Pascual (Argentina) P Suárez	6	6

Semifinals
(Russia) A Chakvetadze (Russia) E Vesnina	6	6^{6}	6
4	(France) M Bartoli (Argentina) G Dulko	3	7^{8}	3
(Finland) E Laine (Spain) MJ Martínez Sánchez	4	2
2	(Spain) V Ruano Pascual (Argentina) P Suárez	6	6

Final
(Russia) A Chakvetadze (Russia) E Vesnina	2	4
2	(Spain) V Ruano Pascual (Argentina) P Suárez	6	6
