= 2007 China Open – Men's doubles =

Men's doubles
- 2007 China Open

Final
- Champions: (South Africa) Rik de Voest (Australia) Ashley Fisher
- Runners-up: (South Africa) Chris Haggard (Chinese Taipei) Yen-hsun Lu
- Score: 6–7^{(3–7)}, 6–0, [10–6]

Events
Singles	men	women
Doubles	men	women
← 2006 ·	China Open	· 2008 →

Mahesh Bhupathi and Mario Ančić were the defending champions, but Ančić chose not to participate, and only Bhupathi competed that year.

Rik de Voest and Ashley Fisher won in the final 6–7^{(3–7)}, 6–0, [10–6], against Chris Haggard and Yen-hsun Lu.

== Seeds ==
1. (India) Mahesh Bhupathi / (India) Rohan Bopanna (first round)
2. (United States) Scott Lipsky / (United States) David Martin (semifinals)
3. (United States) Eric Butorac / (United Kingdom) Ross Hutchins (semifinals)
4. (South Africa) Rik de Voest / (Australia) Ashley Fisher (champions)

== Draw ==
=== Key ===
- Q = Qualifier
- WC = Wild card
- LL = Lucky loser
- Alt = Alternate
- SE = Special exempt
- PR = Protected ranking
- ITF = ITF entry
- JE = Junior exempt
- w/o = Walkover
- r = Retired
- d = Defaulted
- SR = Special ranking

=== Draw ===
First round
1	(India) M Bhupathi (India) R Bopanna	3	0
(South Africa) C Haggard (Chinese Taipei) Y-h Lu	6	6
(Russia) T Gabashvili (Germany) D Gremelmayr	4	6^{3}
(Chile) P Capdeville (Russia) I Kunitsyn	6	7^{7}
3	(United States) E Butorac (United Kingdom) R Hutchins	4	6	[10]
(Chile) A García (Chile) F González	6	4	[4]
WC	(China) X-y Yu (China) SX Zeng	4	1
(Germany) N Kiefer (Germany) R Schüttler	6	6
(Thailand) S Ratiwatana (Thailand) S Ratiwatana	3	6	[8]
(United States) Z Fleishman (Israel) D Sela	6	4	[10]
WC	(China) W Gao (China) Z Li	1	0
4	(South Africa) R de Voest (Australia) A Fisher	6	6
(Austria) A Peya (Germany) B Phau	6	3	[10]
(Serbia) B Pashanki (Serbia) V Troicki	1	6	[7]
(South Korea) H-t Lee (Thailand) D Udomchoke	3	6	[8]
2	(United States) S Lipsky (United States) D Martin	6	4	[10]

Quarterfinals
(South Africa) C Haggard (Chinese Taipei) Y-h Lu	2	6	[10]
(Chile) P Capdeville (Russia) I Kunitsyn	6	1	[8]
3	(United States) E Butorac (United Kingdom) R Hutchins	6	6
(Germany) N Kiefer (Germany) R Schüttler	4	1
(United States) Z Fleishman (Israel) D Sela	3	7	6
4	(South Africa) R de Voest (Australia) A Fisher	6	5	[10]
(Austria) A Peya (Germany) B Phau	6^{5}	7^{7}	[9]
2	(United States) S Lipsky (United States) D Martin	7^{7}	6^{5}	[11]

Semifinals
(South Africa) C Haggard (Chinese Taipei) Y-h Lu	6	6
3	(United States) E Butorac (United Kingdom) R Hutchins	4	3
4	(South Africa) R de Voest (Australia) A Fisher	7^{7}	7^{8}
2	(United States) S Lipsky (United States) D Martin	6^{3}	6^{6}

Final
(South Africa) C Haggard (Chinese Taipei) Y-h Lu	7^{7}	0	[6]
4	(South Africa) R de Voest (Australia) A Fisher	6^{3}	6	[10]
