= 2005 Serena Williams tennis season =

- Full name: Serena Jameka Williams
- Country: United States
- Calendar prize money: 1,076,226

Singles
- Season record: 21–7 (75%)
- Calendar titles: 1
- Year-end ranking: 11
- Ranking change from previous year: ▼4

Grand Slam & significant results
- Australian Open: W
- French Open: A
- Wimbledon: 3R
- US Open: 4R

Serena Williams's 2005 tennis season was hampered by injury and was the first time that she did not qualify for the Year-End Championships since 1999. Williams also failed to finish in the top 10 for the first time since 1998 despite winning a slam.

== Year in detail ==
=== Australian Open and early hard court season ===
==== Australian Open ====
"I didn't deserve to win the way I played," Williams said after her victory. "My serve was horrible. I've worked really hard on it. It's just, I'm a perfectionist, and I played really bad. I don't see too many positives out of except I think I ran well for it on some dropshots. That's about it."

— Williams after her win against Petrova

Williams began her 2005 season at the Australian Open after missing the 2004 edition and winning the 2003 edition. Williams entered the event as the seventh seed. In her opening match she easily dispatch of Camille Pin, defeating the Frenchwoman with a double breadstick. She then faced Dally Randriantefy, Williams dominated her opponent dropping just three games including a bagel in the second in just 48 minutes. Williams hit 38 winners and only 18 unforced errors in the match. In the third round, Williams took on wildcard Sania Mirza, Williams closed out the first set with a breadstick and then won the second set with a single break lead in just 56 minutes. In the following match, she faced Nadia Petrova and won the first set easily with a breadstick. Petrova came back winning the second, but Williams eventually closed it out in the third set. In the final eight, she went against 2nd seed Amélie Mauresmo and dominated her injured opponent, who was hampered by an injured groin winning both sets with a drop of two games. In the semifinals, Williams took on Maria Sharapova. Sharapova dominated the first set breaking Williams twice. Sharapova then served for the match at the tenth game, but lost three straight games to lose the set. In the final set, Sharapova once again served for the match at the tenth game, however Williams saved three match points to break. Williams eventually broke for the match in the 14th game of the deciding set. In the final, Williams faced world no. 1 Lindsay Davenport, Davenport raced through the first four games in just 11 minutes. Davenport eventually won the set in the eight game. Williams then failed to convert a break point in the sixth game, but reeled in nine straight games to win the second and third sets. This is Williams seventh slam and second Australian Open. She is also riding with a 14 match winning streak at the event.

==== Open GDF Suez ====
Following her Australian Open triumph, Williams played at the Open GDF Suez. After receiving a bye in the first round, she cruised pass local Stéphanie Cohen-Aloro in straight sets before withdrawing in her scheduled quarterfinal match against Dinara Safina because of stomach flu.

==== Dubai Duty Free Women's Open ====
Williams then played at the Dubai Duty Free Women's Open and received a bye in the first round. Williams began her tournament against Elena Bovina. Williams slow start gave Bovina the chance to capture the first set with a loss of only a game. However Williams rallied to win 10 of the next 11 games to win the second set and take the first four games of the third. Bovina came back to get one of the breaks back in the sixth game just to see Williams close it out in the tenth game. Williams then faced Daniela Hantuchová in the final eight. Williams edged out Hantuchová in the first set, closing it out in the twelfth game. The second set was easier for Williams winning it in three. In the semifinals, Williams retired in her match against Jelena Janković with an arm injury after losing the first set in a bagel and down by a break in the second.

==== NASDAQ-100 Open ====
Williams came into the NASDAQ-100 Open as the three-time defending champion. Williams began her quest for her fourth consecutive title at the event against Vera Dushevina, Williams won the match with a drop of only three game including a bagel in the second. Williams then took on Shahar Pe'er and won the match with a drop of three games in both set. In the fourth round, Williams faced Elena Likhovtseva and won the first with a break lead. However, Likhovtseva evened it out by dominating the second set with a breadstick. Williams then pegged her back to win the match with a break lead in the deciding set. Williams then took on older sister Venus for a spot in the last 4. Venus took the first set with ease, winning the first set with a breadstick. In the second set, Serena had two set points to push it to a decider but Venus saved both and won the set. This loss ended Serena's 21 match winning streak in the event.

=== Clay court season and French Open ===
==== Bausch & Lomb Championships ====
Williams began her clay court campaign at the Bausch & Lomb Championships. She received a bye in the first round and then cruised through victory against Dally Randriantefy in straight sets. In the third round, she took on Mary Pierce and squeezed through the first set winning it in a tie-break. The second set was tight as well, but Williams won the set with a single break lead. In the final eight, Williams faced Italian Silvia Farina Elia. The first set, the pair went toe-to-toe with Williams winning it in the twelfth game. However, the Italian came back winning the second in a tie-break. After the conclusion of the second set, Williams retired due to a sprained ankle.

==== Internazionali BNL d'Italia ====
Williams then played at the Internazionali BNL d'Italia and received a bye in the first round. Williams was upset in the second round by Francesca Schiavone, Schiavone won the first set in a tie-break and then took the second set with a breadstick.

==== French Open ====
Williams then withdrew from the French Open with a sprained left ankle.

=== Wimbledon ===
Williams made her return at Wimbledon having reached the final in the previous three years. Williams began her campaign for a third Wimbledon against compatriot ranked 104 Angela Haynes. Williams led by a break but Haynes came back to force it to a tie-break, which went to a marathon with Haynes winning it in the 26th point. William broke in the third game, but Haynes broke back in the eight game. Williams won the next to games to push to a decider. The final set went on serve until Williams took the last four games beginning with the fifth. Williams then faced 124 ranked Mara Santangelo. Santangelo began the match winning the first four games and closed out the first set in the eight game. However, Williams came back winning the next two sets with ease. Williams then took on American Jill Craybas, Craybas broke in the second game, the pair then traded breaks until Craybas held in the ninth game to win the set. The second set then went to a tie-break which Craybas won, upsetting the two-time Wimbledon champion.

=== US Open and late hard court season ===
==== Rogers Cup ====
Williams then made her US Open preparation at the Rogers Cup in Toronto. Williams opened her tournament against Stéphanie Cohen-Aloro after receiving a bye in the first round. Cohen-Aloro broke in the first game but Williams won the next two to get it on serve. Cohen Aloro then took 6 of the last 7 games to win the set with a break of serve. Williams then came back winning the second set with a single break lead. In the final set, Williams broke in the first and third game and didn't look back closing it out in the eight game. Williams then withdrew prior to her match against Flavia Pennetta with a left knee pain.

==== US Open ====
Williams then competed at the US Open. She began her campaign against Taiwan's Chan Yung-jan. Williams took the first set with a breadstick and then won the last four games of the second set from the sixth game. Williams then faced Catalina Castaño and dropped only four games with a straight sets victory dropping two games in each set. In the third round, Williams faced Francesca Schiavone and once again won easily winning both set with a single break lead. In the Round of 16, it was a Williams battle, as she took on sister Venus. The first set the sisters went toe-to-toe pushing it to a tie-break, which Venus won. Venus then carried the momentum winning the second set with ease to end her younger sisters US Open campaign.

==== China Open ====
Williams played her final tournament of 2005 at the China Open but was upset by local 127th ranked Sun Tiantian. Sun won the first set with ease but was pushed by her higher ranked opponent into a tie-break, which the Chinese won.

== All matches ==
=== Singles matches ===
Tournament	Match	Round	Opponent	Rank	Result	Score
Australian Open; Melbourne, Australia; Grand Slam; Hard, outdoor 17–30 January 2005	344	1R	(France) Camille Pin	#106	Win	6–1, 6–1
Australian Open; Melbourne, Australia; Grand Slam; Hard, outdoor 17–30 January 2005	345	2R	(Madagascar) Dally Randriantefy	#67	Win	6–3, 6–0
Australian Open; Melbourne, Australia; Grand Slam; Hard, outdoor 17–30 January 2005	346	3R	(India) Sania Mirza	#166	Win	6–1, 6–4
Australian Open; Melbourne, Australia; Grand Slam; Hard, outdoor 17–30 January 2005	347	4R	(Russia) Nadia Petrova	#13	Win	6–1, 3–6, 6–3
Australian Open; Melbourne, Australia; Grand Slam; Hard, outdoor 17–30 January 2005	348	QF	(France) Amélie Mauresmo	#2	Win	6–2, 6–2
Australian Open; Melbourne, Australia; Grand Slam; Hard, outdoor 17–30 January 2005	349	SF	(Russia) Maria Sharapova	#5	Win	2–6, 7–5, 8–6
Australian Open; Melbourne, Australia; Grand Slam; Hard, outdoor 17–30 January 2005	350	F	(United States) Lindsay Davenport	#1	Win	2–6, 6–3, 6–0
Open GDF Suez; Paris, France; WTA Tier II; Hard, indoors 7–13 February 2005	–	1R	Bye			
Open GDF Suez; Paris, France; WTA Tier II; Hard, indoors 7–13 February 2005	351	2R	(France) Stéphanie Cohen-Aloro	#94	Win	6–3, 6–2
Open GDF Suez; Paris, France; WTA Tier II; Hard, indoors 7–13 February 2005	–	QF	(Russia) Dinara Safina	#48	Withdrew	N/A
Dubai Duty Free Women's Open; Dubai, United Arab Emirates; WTA Tier II; Hard; 28 February - 6 March 2005	–	1R	Bye			
Dubai Duty Free Women's Open; Dubai, United Arab Emirates; WTA Tier II; Hard; 28 February - 6 March 2005	352	2R	(Russia) Elena Bovina	#15	Win	1–6, 6–1, 6–4
Dubai Duty Free Women's Open; Dubai, United Arab Emirates; WTA Tier II; Hard; 28 February - 6 March 2005	353	QF	(Slovakia) Daniela Hantuchová	#22	Win	7–5, 6–3
Dubai Duty Free Women's Open; Dubai, United Arab Emirates; WTA Tier II; Hard; 28 February - 6 March 2005	354	SF	(Serbia and Montenegro) Jelena Janković	#28	Loss	0–6, 3–4 Ret
NASDAQ-100 Open; Key Biscayne, Miami, USA; WTA Tier I Hard; 21 March - 3 April 2005	–	1R	Bye			
NASDAQ-100 Open; Key Biscayne, Miami, USA; WTA Tier I Hard; 21 March - 3 April 2005	355	2R	(Russia) Vera Dushevina	#42	Win	6–3, 6–0
NASDAQ-100 Open; Key Biscayne, Miami, USA; WTA Tier I Hard; 21 March - 3 April 2005	356	3R	(Israel) Shahar Pe'er	#135	Win	6–3, 6–3
NASDAQ-100 Open; Key Biscayne, Miami, USA; WTA Tier I Hard; 21 March - 3 April 2005	357	4R	(Russia) Elena Likhovtseva	#17	Win	6–4, 1–6, 6–4
NASDAQ-100 Open; Key Biscayne, Miami, USA; WTA Tier I Hard; 21 March - 3 April 2005	358	QF	(United States) Venus Williams	#9	Loss	1–6, 6–7^{(8–10)}
Bausch & Lomb Championships; Amelia Island, USA; WTA Tier II; Clay, Green; 4–10 April 2005	–	1R	Bye			
Bausch & Lomb Championships; Amelia Island, USA; WTA Tier II; Clay, Green; 4–10 April 2005	359	2R	(Madagascar) Dally Randriantefy	#45	Win	6–3, 6–1
Bausch & Lomb Championships; Amelia Island, USA; WTA Tier II; Clay, Green; 4–10 April 2005	360	3R	(France) Mary Pierce	#27	Win	7–6^{(7–5)}, 6–4
Bausch & Lomb Championships; Amelia Island, USA; WTA Tier II; Clay, Green; 4–10 April 2005	361	QF	(Italy) Silvia Farina Elia	#24	Loss	7–5, 6–7^{(8–10)} Ret
Internazionali BNL d'Italia; Rome, Italy; WTA Tier I Clay, Red; 9–15 May 2005	–	1R	Bye			
Internazionali BNL d'Italia; Rome, Italy; WTA Tier I Clay, Red; 9–15 May 2005	362	2R	(Italy) Francesca Schiavone	#26	Loss	6–7^{(2–7)}, 1–6
Wimbledon; London, United Kingdom; Grand Slam; Grass; 20 June - 3 July 2005	363	1R	(United States) Angela Haynes	#104	Win	6–7^{(12–14)}, 6–4, 6–2
Wimbledon; London, United Kingdom; Grand Slam; Grass; 20 June - 3 July 2005	364	2R	(Italy) Mara Santangelo	#124	Win	2–6, 6–3, 6–2
Wimbledon; London, United Kingdom; Grand Slam; Grass; 20 June - 3 July 2005	365	3R	(United States) Jill Craybas	#85	Loss	3–6, 6–7^{(4–7)}
Rogers Cup; Toronto, Canada; WTA Tier I Hard; 15 – 21 August 2005	–	1R	Bye			
Rogers Cup; Toronto, Canada; WTA Tier I Hard; 15 – 21 August 2005	366	2R	(France) Stéphanie Cohen-Aloro	#92	Win	3–6, 6–4, 6–2
Rogers Cup; Toronto, Canada; WTA Tier I Hard; 15 – 21 August 2005	–	3R	(Italy) Flavia Pennetta	#30	Withdrew	N/A
US Open; New York City, United States; Grand Slam; Hard, outdoor 29 August - 11 September 2005	367	1R	(Chinese Taipei) Chan Yung-jan	#261	Win	6–1, 6–3
US Open; New York City, United States; Grand Slam; Hard, outdoor 29 August - 11 September 2005	368	2R	(Colombia) Catalina Castaño	#69	Win	6–2, 6–2
US Open; New York City, United States; Grand Slam; Hard, outdoor 29 August - 11 September 2005	369	3R	(Italy) Francesca Schiavone	#26	Win	6–3, 6–4
US Open; New York City, United States; Grand Slam; Hard, outdoor 29 August - 11 September 2005	370	4R	(United States) Venus Williams	#10	Loss	6–7^{(5–7)}, 2–6
China Open; Beijing, China; WTA Tier II; Hard; 19–25 September 2005	–	1R	Bye			
China Open; Beijing, China; WTA Tier II; Hard; 19–25 September 2005	371	2R	(China) Sun Tiantian	#127	Loss	2–6, 6–7^{(7–9)}

== Tournament schedule ==
=== Singles schedule ===
Williams' 2005 singles tournament schedule is as follows:

Date	Championship	Location	Category	Surface	Points	Outcome
17 January 2005 – 30 January 2005	Australian Open	Melbourne (AUS)	Grand Slam	Hard	700	Winner defeated Lindsay Davenport 2–6, 6–3, 6–0
7 February 2005 – 13 February 2005	Open GDF Suez	Paris (FRA)	WTA Tier II	Hard (i)	49	Third Round; Withdrew before match against Dinara Safina
28 February 2005 – 6 March 2005	Dubai Duty Free Women's Open	Dubai (UAE)	WTA Tier II	Hard	88	Semifinals lost to Jelena Janković, 0–6, 3–4 Ret
21 March 2005 – 3 April 2005	NASDAQ-100 Open	Miami (USA)	WTA Tier I	Hard	87	Quarterfinals lost to Venus Williams 1–6, 6–7^{(8–10)}
4 April 2005 – 10 April 2005	Bausch & Lomb Championships	Amelia Islands (USA)	WTA Tier II	Clay (green)	49	Quarterfinals lost to Silvia Farina Elia 7–5, 6–7^{(8–10)} Ret
9 May 2005 – 15 May 2005	Internazionali BNL d'Italia	Rome (ITA)	WTA Tier I	Clay	1	Second Round lost to Francesca Schiavone 6–7^{(2–7)}, 1–6
20 June 2005 – 3 July 2005	Wimbledon Championships	London (GBR)	Grand Slam	Grass	62	Third Round lost to Jill Craybas, 3–6, 6–7^{(4–7)}
15 August 2005 – 21 August 2005	Rogers Cup	Toronto (CAN)	WTA Tier I	Hard	42	Third Round; Withdrew before match against Flavia Pennetta
29 August 2005 – 11 September 2005	US Open	New York (USA)	Grand Slam	Hard	96	Fourth Round lost to Venus Williams, 6–7^{(5–7)}, 2–6
19 September 2005 – 25 September 2005	China Open	Beijing (CHN)	WTA Tier II	Hard	1	Second Round lost to Sun Tiantian, 2–6, 6–7^{(7–9)}
Total year-end points					1175	

== Yearly records ==
=== Head–to–head matchups ===
Ordered by percentage of wins

- (Madagascar) Dally Randriantefy 2–0
- (France) Stéphanie Cohen-Aloro 2–0
- (France) Camille Pin 1–0
- (Russia) Nadia Petrova 1–0
- (India) Sania Mirza 1–0
- (France) Amélie Mauresmo 1–0
- (Italy) Mara Santangelo 1–0
- (Russia) Elena Likhovtseva 1–0
- (Chinese Taipei) Chan Yung-jan 1–0
- (Russia) Maria Sharapova 1–0
- (United States) Lindsay Davenport 1–0
- (Slovakia) Daniela Hantuchová 1–0
- (Russia) Vera Dushevina 1–0
- (Israel) Shahar Pe'er 1–0
- (Russia) Elena Bovina 1–0
- (France) Mary Pierce 1–0
- (United States) Angela Haynes 1–0
- (Colombia) Catalina Castaño 1–0
- (Italy) Francesca Schiavone 1–1
- (Italy) Silvia Farina Elia 0–1
- (United States) Jill Craybas 0–1
- (China) Sun Tiantian 0–1
- (Serbia and Montenegro) Jelena Janković 0–1
- (United States) Venus Williams 0–2

=== Finals ===
==== Singles: 1 (1–0) ====
Legend Grand Slam (1–0)	Finals by surface Hard (1–0)	Finals by venue Outdoors (1–0)

Outcome	No.	Date	Championship	Surface	Opponent in the final	Score in the final
Winner	26.	January 29, 2005	Australian Open, Melbourne, Australia (2)	Hard	(United States) Lindsay Davenport	2–6, 6–3, 6–0

=== Earnings ===
#	Event	Prize money	Year-to-date
1	Australian Open	$821,904	$821,904
2	Open GDF Suez	$14,100	$836,004
3	Dubai Duty Free Women's Open	$45,150	$881,154
4	NASDAQ-100 Open	$58,000	$939,154
5	Bausch & Lomb Championships	$12,450	$951,604
6	Internazionali BNL d'Italia	$6,500	$958,104
7	Wimbledon Championships	$34,200	$992,304
8	Rogers Cup	$12,450	$1,004,754
9	US Open	$63,872	$1,068,626
10	China Open	$7,600	$1,076,226
			$1,076,226

Figures in United States dollars (USD) unless noted.

== See also ==
- 2005 Maria Sharapova tennis season
- 2005 WTA Tour

Sporting positions
Preceded by Venus Williams; Angelique Kerber	World No. 1 First stint: July 8, 2002 – August 10, 2003; Last stint: April 24, 2017 – May 14, 2017	Succeeded by Kim Clijsters; Angelique Kerber
Preceded by Jennifer Capriati; Justine Henin; Petra Kvitová	Year-end World No. 1; 2002; 2008, 2009; 2012 – 2015	Succeeded by Justine Henin; Kim Clijsters; Angelique Kerber
Awards
Preceded by Jennifer Capriati; Jelena Janković; Petra Kvitová	ITF Women's Singles World Champion; 2002; 2009; 2012 – 2015	Succeeded by Justine Henin; Caroline Wozniacki; Angelique Kerber
Preceded by Martina Hingis & Anna Kournikova; Cara Black & Liezel Huber	WTA Doubles Team of the Year; 2000 (with Venus Williams); 2009 (with Venus Williams)	Succeeded by Lisa Raymond & Rennae Stubbs; Gisela Dulko & Flavia Pennetta
Preceded by Cara Black & Liezel Huber	ITF Women's Doubles World Champion; 2009 (with Venus Williams)	Succeeded by Gisela Dulko & Flavia Pennetta
