= 2007 China Open – Men's singles =

Men's singles
- 2007 China Open

Final
- Champion: (Chile) Fernando González
- Runner-up: (Spain) Tommy Robredo
- Score: 6–1, 3–6, 6–1

Events
Singles	men	women
Doubles	men	women
← 2006 ·	China Open	· 2008 →

Marcos Baghdatis was the defending champion, but lost in the quarterfinals to Ivan Ljubičić.

Fernando González won in the final 6–1, 3–6, 6–1, against Tommy Robredo.

== Seeds ==
1. (Russia) Nikolay Davydenko (second round)
2. (Chile) Fernando González (champion)
3. (Spain) Tommy Robredo (final)
4. (Croatia) Ivan Ljubičić (semifinals)
5. (Cyprus) Marcos Baghdatis (quarterfinals)
6. (South Korea) Hyung-taik Lee (quarterfinals)
7. (France) Jo-Wilfried Tsonga (second round)
8. (Russia) Igor Kunitsyn (quarterfinals)

== Draw ==
=== Key ===
- Q = Qualifier
- WC = Wild card
- LL = Lucky loser
- Alt = Alternate
- ITF = ITF entry
- PR = Protected ranking
- SR = Special ranking
- SE = Special exempt
- JE = Junior exempt
- JR = Junior Accelerator Programme entrant
- CO = College Accelerator Programme entrant
- NG = Next Gen Accelerator Program entrant
- w/o = Walkover
- r = Retired
- d = Defaulted

=== Finals ===
Semifinals
WC	(Germany) Nicolas Kiefer	6^{5}	5
3	(Spain) Tommy Robredo	7^{7}	7
4	(Croatia) Ivan Ljubičić	6	3	4
2	(Chile) Fernando González	2	6	6

Final
3	(Spain) Tommy Robredo	1	6	1
2	(Chile) Fernando González	6	3	6

=== Top half ===
First round
1	(Russia) N Davydenko	6	6
(United States) Z Fleishman	3	3
(Croatia) M Čilić	6^{5}	6	6
(Germany) R Schüttler	7^{7}	3	3
WC	(Germany) N Kiefer	6	6
(Israel) D Sela	2	3
Q	(India) R Bopanna	3	0^{r}
7	(France) J-W Tsonga	6	1
3	(Spain) T Robredo	6	6
(Germany) D Gremelmayr	2	4
(South Africa) R de Voest	6	7^{7}
Q	(South Korea) W-s Jun	4	6^{4}
WC	(China) X-y Yu	3	5
(United States) K Kim	6	7
WC	(China) P Sun	2	6^{7}
8	(Russia) I Kunitsyn	6	7^{9}

Second round
1	(Russia) N Davydenko	3	4
(Croatia) M Čilić	6	6
WC	(Germany) N Kiefer	6	6
7	(France) J-W Tsonga	3	4
3	(Spain) T Robredo	6	6
(South Africa) R de Voest	2	3
(United States) K Kim	6^{4}	4
8	(Russia) I Kunitsyn	7^{7}	6

Quarterfinals
(Croatia) M Čilić	3	5
WC	(Germany) N Kiefer	6	7
3	(Spain) T Robredo	6	6
8	(Russia) I Kunitsyn	3	1

Semifinals
WC	(Germany) N Kiefer	6^{5}	5
3	(Spain) T Robredo	7^{7}	7

=== Bottom half ===
First round
5	(Cyprus) M Baghdatis	7^{7}	7
Q	(China) SX Zeng	6^{3}	5
(Serbia) B Pašanski	6^{4}	6	7
(Chinese Taipei) Y-h Lu	7^{7}	2	6^{6}
(Serbia) V Troicki	6^{3}	6	6
(Russia) T Gabashvili	7^{7}	3	4
Q	(Japan) K Nishikori	3	4
4	(Croatia) I Ljubičić	6	6
6	(South Korea) H-t Lee	6	6
(Chile) A García	4	3
(Italy) D Sanguinetti	7	6^{9}	2
(Germany) B Phau	5	7^{11}	6
(Chile) P Capdeville	6	6
(Thailand) D Udomchoke	2	2
(Austria) A Peya	6	3	5
2	(Chile) F González	3	6	7

Second round
5	(Cyprus) M Baghdatis	6	6
(Serbia) B Pašanski	4	4
(Serbia) V Troicki	1	1
4	(Croatia) I Ljubičić	6	6
6	(South Korea) H-t Lee	7^{7}	6
(Germany) B Phau	6^{4}	1
(Chile) P Capdeville	1	2
2	(Chile) F González	6	6

Quarterfinals
5	(Cyprus) M Baghdatis	4	6	6^{5}
4	(Croatia) I Ljubičić	6	4	7^{7}
6	(South Korea) H-t Lee	5	7^{7}	4
2	(Chile) F González	7	6^{5}	6

Semifinals
4	(Croatia) I Ljubičić	6	3	4
2	(Chile) F González	2	6	6
