= 2005 China Open – Women's singles =

Women's singles
- 2005 China Open

Final
- Champion: (Russia) Maria Kirilenko
- Runner-up: (Germany) Anna-Lena Grönefeld
- Score: 6–3, 6–4

Details
- Seeds: 8

Events
Singles	men	women
Doubles	men	women
← 2004 ·	China Open	· 2006 →

Serena Williams was the defending champion, but lost in the second round to Sun Tiantian. Tiantian became the first ever player ranked outside the top 100 to defeat Williams in a main draw match.

Maria Kirilenko won the title by defeating Anna-Lena Grönefeld 6–3, 6–4 in the final.

== Seeds ==
The top four seeds receive a bye into the second round.

1. (Russia) Maria Sharapova (semifinals, retired)
2. (United States) ~~Lindsay Davenport~~ (withdrew due to a low back strain)
3. (United States) Venus Williams (quarterfinals, withdrew)
4. (United States) Serena Williams (second round)
5. (Australia) Alicia Molik (first round)
6. (Serbia and Montenegro) Jelena Janković (first round)
7. (France) Tatiana Golovin (first round)
8. (Italy) Flavia Pennetta (first round)
9. (Germany) Anna-Lena Grönefeld (final)

== Draw ==
=== Key ===
- Q = Qualifier
- WC = Wild card
- LL = Lucky loser
- Alt = Alternate
- SE = Special exempt
- PR = Protected ranking
- ITF = ITF entry
- JE = Junior exempt
- w/o = Walkover
- r = Retired
- d = Defaulted
- SR = Special ranking

=== Finals ===
Semifinals
1	(Russia) Maria Sharapova	4	1^{r}
(Russia) Maria Kirilenko	6	2
(Poland) Marta Domachowska	5	3
9	(Germany) Anna-Lena Grönefeld	7	6

Final
(Russia) Maria Kirilenko	6	6
9	(Germany) Anna-Lena Grönefeld	3	4

=== Top half ===
First round
(Israel) S Pe'er	6	6
(Russia) V Dushevina	2	0
(China) N Li	6	6^{4}	5
(United States) J Craybas	4	7^{7}	7
(Japan) S Asagoe	6	6
7	(France) T Golovin	3	4
Q	(Russia) T Panova	3	4
WC	(China) T Sun	6	6
(Russia) M Kirilenko	7	7
Q	(United States) J Jackson	5	5
Q	(Japan) A Nakamura	3	6	6
8	(Italy) F Pennetta	6	4	4

Second round
1	(Russia) M Sharapova	6	5	6
(Israel) S Pe'er	0	7	2
(United States) J Craybas	2	4
(Japan) S Asagoe	6	6
4	(United States) S Williams	2	6^{7}
WC	(China) T Sun	6	7^{9}
(Russia) M Kirilenko	6	7^{7}
Q	(Japan) A Nakamura	1	6^{3}

Quarterfinals
1	(Russia) M Sharapova	6	6
(Japan) S Asagoe	4	1
WC	(China) T Sun	1	3
(Russia) M Kirilenko	6	6

Semifinals
1	(Russia) M Sharapova	4	1^{r}
(Russia) M Kirilenko	6	2

=== Bottom half ===
First round
6	(Serbia and Montenegro) J Janković	5	6	5
WC	(China) J Zheng	7	4	7
(United States) M Shaughnessy	3	3
(Poland) M Domachowska	6	6
(Spain) N Llagostera Vives	2	6	7^{7}
LL	(Russia) A Jidkova	6	0	6^{5}
5	(Australia) A Molik	6^{1}	7^{7}	4
(Argentina) M Díaz Oliva	7^{7}	6^{4}	6
Q	(Finland) E Laine	1	1
(China) S Peng	6	6
(Japan) A Morigami	6^{3}	4
WC	(Japan) A Sugiyama	7^{7}	6

Second round
WC	(China) J Zheng	3	1
(Poland) M Domachowska	6	6
(Spain) N Llagostera Vives	3	1
3	(United States) V Williams	6	6
(Argentina) M Díaz Oliva	6	2	6^{0}
(China) S Peng	3	6	7^{7}
WC	(Japan) A Sugiyama	2	3
9	(Germany) A-L Grönefeld	6	6

Quarterfinals
(Poland) M Domachowska	w/o
3	(United States) V Williams
(China) S Peng	5	1
9	(Germany) A-L Grönefeld	7	6

Semifinals
(Poland) M Domachowska	5	3
9	(Germany) A-L Grönefeld	7	6
