= 2006 China Open (tennis) =

- Date: September 11–18 (men); September 18–24 (women)
- Edition: 8th
- Location: Beijing, China

Champions

Men's singles
- (Cyprus) Marcos Baghdatis

Women's singles
- (Russia) Svetlana Kuznetsova

Men's doubles
- (Croatia) Mario Ančić / (India) Mahesh Bhupathi

Women's doubles
- (Spain) Virginia Ruano Pascual / (Argentina) Paola Suárez
← 2005 ·	China Open	· 2007 →

The 2006 China Open was an ATP International Series and WTA Tour Tier II tennis tournament held in Beijing, China. The men's tournament was held September 11–18, and the women's was held September 18–25

Marcos Baghdatis won his first title of the year, and of his career. Svetlana Kuznetsova won her 2nd title of the year.

== Finals ==
=== Men's singles ===
(Cyprus) Marcos Baghdatis defeated (Croatia) Mario Ančić, 6–4, 6–0

=== Women's singles ===
(Russia) Svetlana Kuznetsova defeated (France) Amélie Mauresmo, 6–4, 6–0

=== Men's doubles ===
(Croatia) Mario Ančić / (India) Mahesh Bhupathi defeated (Germany) Michael Berrer / (Denmark) Kenneth Carlsen, 6–4, 6–3

=== Women's doubles ===
(Spain) Virginia Ruano Pascual / (Argentina) Paola Suárez defeated (Russia) Anna Chakvetadze / (Russia) Elena Vesnina, 6–2, 6–4
