= 2005 China Open – Women's doubles =

Women's doubles
- 2005 China Open

Final
- Champions: (Spain) Nuria Llagostera Vives (Venezuela) María Vento-Kabchi
- Runners-up: (China) Yan Zi (China) Zheng Jie
- Score: 6–2, 6–4

Events
Singles	men	women
Doubles	men	women
← 2004 ·	China Open	· 2006 →

Emmanuelle Gagliardi and Dinara Safina were the defending champions, but none competed this year. Gagliardi competed in Kolkata at the same week, while Safina decided to rest after her participation in the Fed Cup final.

Nuria Llagostera Vives and María Vento-Kabchi won the title by defeating Yan Zi and Zheng Jie 6–2, 6–4 in the final.

== Seeds ==
1. (Australia) Alicia Molik / (United States) Meghann Shaughnessy (first round)
2. (United States) Corina Morariu / (Italy) Flavia Pennetta (semifinals)
3. (China) Li Ting / (China) Sun Tiantian (semifinals)
4. (Japan) Shinobu Asagoe / (Chinese Taipei) Janet Lee (first round)

== Draw ==
=== Key ===
- Q = Qualifier
- WC = Wild card
- LL = Lucky loser
- Alt = Alternate
- SE = Special exempt
- PR = Protected ranking
- ITF = ITF entry
- JE = Junior exempt
- w/o = Walkover
- r = Retired
- d = Defaulted
- SR = Special ranking

=== Draw ===
First round
1	(Australia) A Molik (United States) M Shaughnessy	6	6^{5}	1
(Spain) N Llagostera Vives (Venezuela) M Vento-Kabchi	4	7^{7}	6
WC	(China) W Liu (China) S Sun	6^{5}	6	7^{7}
(Australia) L McShea (Australia) B Stewart	7^{7}	2	6^{4}
3	(China) T Li (China) T Sun	4	6	7^{7}
(Poland) M Domachowska (Russia) M Kirilenko	6	4	6^{5}
(United States) J Craybas (Russia) A Jidkova	4	7^{7}	0
(Russia) V Dushevina (South Africa) N Grandin	6	6^{4}	6
(China) Z Yan (China) J Zheng	6	0	6
(Serbia and Montenegro) J Janković (Japan) A Sugiyama	4	6	1
(Latvia) L Dekmeijere (Germany) M Müller	6	6
4	(Japan) S Asagoe (Chinese Taipei) J Lee	3	3
Q	(Czech Republic) E Hrdinová (Finland) E Laine	3	2
(China) N Li (China) S Peng	6	6
(Australia) T Musgrave (Israel) S Pe'er	4	3
2	(United States) C Morariu (Italy) F Pennetta	6	6

Quarterfinals
(Spain) N Llagostera Vives (Venezuela) M Vento-Kabchi	5	6	6
WC	(China) W Liu (China) S Sun	7	1	2
3	(China) T Li (China) T Sun	1	7^{7}	6
(Russia) V Dushevina (South Africa) N Grandin	6	6^{5}	2
(China) Z Yan (China) J Zheng	7	6
(Latvia) L Dekmeijere (Germany) M Müller	5	2
(China) N Li (China) S Peng	4	3
2	(United States) C Morariu (Italy) F Pennetta	6	6

Semifinals
(Spain) N Llagostera Vives (Venezuela) M Vento-Kabchi	6	2	6
3	(China) T Li (China) T Sun	1	6	2
(China) Z Yan (China) J Zheng	6	6
2	(United States) C Morariu (Italy) F Pennetta	1	3

Final
(Spain) N Llagostera Vives (Venezuela) M Vento-Kabchi	6	6
(China) Z Yan (China) J Zheng	2	4
