= 2007 China Open – Women's doubles =

Women's doubles
- 2007 China Open

Final
- Champions: (Chinese Taipei) Chia-jung Chuang (Chinese Taipei) Su-wei Hsieh
- Runners-up: (China) Xinyun Han (China) Xu Yifan
- Score: 7–6(3), 6–3

Events
Singles	men	women
Doubles	men	women
← 2006 ·	China Open	· 2008 →

Virginia Ruano Pascual and Paola Suárez were the defending champions, but Suarez retired from the sport on September 1, 2007, and only Ruano Pascual competed that year.

Chia-jung Chuang and Su-wei Hsieh won in the final 7–6(3), 6–3, against Xinyun Han and Xu Yifan.

== Seeds ==
1. (Spain) Anabel Medina Garrigues / (Spain) Virginia Ruano Pascual (quarterfinals)
2. (China) Peng Shuai / (China) Yan Zi (semifinals)
3. (Chinese Taipei) Chuang Chia-jung / (Chinese Taipei) Hsieh Su-wei (champions)
4. (China) Sun Shengnan / (China) Sun Tiantian (first round)

== Draw ==
=== Key ===
- Q = Qualifier
- WC = Wild card
- LL = Lucky loser
- Alt = Alternate
- SE = Special exempt
- PR = Protected ranking
- ITF = ITF entry
- JE = Junior exempt
- w/o = Walkover
- r = Retired
- d = Defaulted
- SR = Special ranking

=== Draw ===
First round
1	(Spain) A Medina Garrigues (Spain) V Ruano Pascual	7	6
(United States) J Craybas (South Africa) N Grandin	5	3
(China) C Ji (China) S Zhang	3	6	[6]
WC	(China) X Han (China) Y-f Xu	6	4	[10]
4	(China) S Sun (China) T Sun	6^{8}	6	[7]
(Russia) A Jidkova (Denmark) C Wozniacki	7	1	[10]
(Spain) L Domínguez Lino (Argentina) ME Salerni	6	4	[5]
(Colombia) C Castaño (United States) A Spears	1	6	[10]
(United States) J Ditty (United States) R Kops-Jones	2	4
(Japan) A Morigami (Japan) A Nakamura	6	6
(China) L Huang (Russia) M Kondratieva	4	1
3	(Chinese Taipei) C-j Chuang (Chinese Taipei) S-w Hsieh	6	6
(Greece) E Daniilidou (Germany) J Wöhr	6	6
(Germany) M Müller (Czech Republic) G Navrátilová	1	2
(France) S Lefèvre (Romania) A Szatmári	2	6^{6}
2	(China) S Peng (China) Z Yan	6	7

Quarterfinals
1	(Spain) A Medina Garrigues (Spain) V Ruano Pascual	3	6	[1]
WC	(China) X Han (China) Y-f Xu	6	2	[10]
(Russia) A Jidkova (Denmark) C Wozniacki	6	1	[3]
(Colombia) C Castaño (United States) A Spears	1	6	[10]
(Japan) A Morigami (Japan) A Nakamura	1	5
3	(Chinese Taipei) C-j Chuang (Chinese Taipei) S-w Hsieh	6	7
(Greece) E Daniilidou (Germany) J Wöhr	1	4
2	(China) S Peng (China) Z Yan	6	6

Semifinals
WC	(China) X Han (China) Y-f Xu	6	6
(Colombia) C Castaño (United States) A Spears	3	4
3	(Chinese Taipei) C-j Chuang (Chinese Taipei) S-w Hsieh	6	4	[10]
2	(China) S Peng (China) Z Yan	3	6	[5]

Final
WC	(China) X Han (China) Y-f Xu	6^{3}	3
3	(Chinese Taipei) C-j Chuang (Chinese Taipei) S-w Hsieh	7	6
