= 2007 China Open (tennis) =

- Date: September 10–16 (men); September 17–23 (women)
- Edition: 9th
- Location: Beijing, China
- Venue: Beijing Tennis Center

Champions

Men's singles
- (Chile) Fernando González

Women's singles
- (Hungary) Ágnes Szávay

Men's doubles
- (South Africa) Rik de Voest / (Australia) Ashley Fisher

Women's doubles
- (Chinese Taipei) Chia-Jung Chuang / (Chinese Taipei) Su-Wei Hsieh
| ← 2006 · | China Open | · 2008 → |

The 2007 China Open was a tennis tournament played on outdoor hard courts. It was the 9th edition of the China Open, and was part of the International Series of the 2007 ATP Tour, and of the Tier II Series of the 2007 WTA Tour. Both the men's and the women's events took place at the Beijing Tennis Center in Beijing, China, with the men playing from September 10 through September 16, 2007, and the women from September 17 through September 23, 2007.

The men's singles featured ATP No. 4, Australian Open quarterfinalist, French Open and US Open semifinalist Nikolay Davydenko, Australian Open and Rome Masters runner-up Fernando González, and Auckland finalist and Sopot titlist Tommy Robredo. Also competing were Doha and 's-Hertogenbosch winner Ivan Ljubičić, Zagreb titlist and Beijing defending champion Marcos Baghdatis, Hyung-taik Lee, Jo-Wilfried Tsonga and Igor Kunitsyn.

The announced women's field was led by WTA No. 2, US Open runner-up, New Haven winner and Beijing defending champion Svetlana Kuznetsova, Charleston and Rome Tier I, Auckland and Birmingham titlist Jelena Janković, and Antwerp champion Amélie Mauresmo. Other seeded players were Moscow Tier I and Istanbul winner Elena Dementieva, Tokyo titlist Martina Hingis, Ágnes Szávay, Anabel Medina Garrigues and Eleni Daniilidou.

WTA no.1 Justine Henin was initially announced to play the 2007 China Open, headlining the women's draw as top seed in what would have been her debut appearance in Beijing. However, fearing that the city's heavy air would aggravate her asthma, she ended up withdrawing prior to the start of the tournament.

== Finals ==
=== Men's singles ===
(Chile) Fernando González defeated (Spain) Tommy Robredo, 6–1, 3–6, 6–1

- It was Fernando González's 1st title of the year, and his 8th overall.

=== Women's singles ===
(Hungary) Ágnes Szávay defeated (Serbia) Jelena Janković, 6–7^{(7–9)}, 7–5, 6–2

- It was Ágnes Szávay's 2nd title of the year, and overall.

=== Men's doubles ===
(South Africa) Rik de Voest / (Australia) Ashley Fisher defeated (South Africa) Chris Haggard / (Chinese Taipei) Yen-hsun Lu, 6–7^{(3–7)}, 6–0, [10–6]

=== Women's doubles ===
(Chinese Taipei) Chia-jung Chuang / (Chinese Taipei) Su-wei Hsieh defeated (China) Xinyun Han / (China) Xu Yifan, 7–6^{(7–2)}, 6–3
