= 2007 China Open – Women's singles =

Women's singles
- 2007 China Open

Final
- Champion: (Hungary) Ágnes Szávay
- Runner-up: (Serbia) Jelena Janković
- Score: 6–7^{(7–9)}, 7–5, 6–2

Details
- Draw: 28 (2WC/4Q/1LL)
- Seeds: 8

Events
Singles	men	women
Doubles	men	women
- China Open

Svetlana Kuznetsova was the defending champion, but was forced to withdraw due to a left abdominal strain.

Ágnes Szávay won in the final 6–7^{(7–9)}, 7–5, 6–2, against Jelena Janković.

Former World No. 1 Martina Hingis played her final professional singles match in the second round, where she lost to home favorite Peng Shuai.

== Seeds ==
The top four seeds received a bye into the second round.

1. (Russia) ~~Svetlana Kuznetsova~~ (withdrew due to a left abdominal strain)
2. (Serbia) Jelena Janković (final)
3. (France) Amélie Mauresmo (quarterfinals)
4. (Russia) Elena Dementieva (quarterfinals)
5. (Switzerland) Martina Hingis (second round)
6. (Hungary) Ágnes Szávay (champion)
7. (Spain) Anabel Medina Garrigues (first round)
8. (Greece) Eleni Daniilidou (second round)

== Draw ==
Key

- Q = Qualifier
- WC = Wild card
- LL = Lucky loser
- Alt = Alternate
- ITF = ITF entry
- PR = Protected ranking
- SR = Special ranking
- SE = Special exempt
- JE = Junior exempt
- JR = Junior Accelerator Programme entrant
- CO = College Accelerator Programme entrant
- NG = Next Gen Accelerator Program entrant
- w/o = Walkover
- r = Retired
- d = Defaulted

=== Finals ===
Semifinals
6	(Hungary) Ágnes Szávay	6	6
(China) Peng Shuai	1	2
PR	(United States) Lindsay Davenport	3	5
2	(Serbia) Jelena Janković	6	7

Final
6	(Hungary) Ágnes Szávay	6^{7}	7	6
2	(Serbia) Jelena Janković	7	5	2

=== Top half ===
First round
WC	(China) Z Yan	5	3
Q	(United States) A Spears	7	6
(Slovakia) D Cibulková	6	6^{5}	6
(Denmark) C Wozniacki	0	7	1
Q	(New Zealand) M Erakovic	5	3
6	(Hungary) Á Szávay	7	6
(Germany) M Müller	2	6	4
(Romania) IR Olaru	6	4	6
Q	(China) Y Xu	1	4
(China) S Peng	6	6
WC	(China) T Sun	2	3
5	(Switzerland) M Hingis	6	6

Second round
LL	(Argentina) ME Salerni	6	7
Q	(United States) A Spears	2	5
(Slovakia) D Cibulková	6^{4}	4
6	(Hungary) Á Szávay	7	6
3	(France) A Mauresmo	6	6
(Romania) IR Olaru	2	2
(China) S Peng	7	6
5	(Switzerland) M Hingis	5	1

Quarterfinals
LL	(Argentina) ME Salerni	2	4
6	(Hungary) Á Szávay	6	6
3	(France) A Mauresmo	6	4	2
(China) S Peng	4	6	6

Semifinals
6	(Hungary) Á Szávay	6	6
(China) S Peng	1	2

=== Bottom half ===
First round
8	(Greece) E Daniilidou	6	6
(Belarus) O Govortsova	2	1
Q	(United States) J Ditty	0	2
PR	(United States) L Davenport	6	6
(Austria) T Paszek	6	6
(United States) J Craybas	3	3
7	(Spain) A Medina Garrigues	4	4
(Japan) A Morigami	6	6
(Spain) L Domínguez Lino	1	6^{4}
(Japan) A Nakamura	6	7
(Spain) V Ruano Pascual	6	6
(Russia) O Poutchkova	1	1

Second round
8	(Greece) E Daniilidou	5	3
PR	(United States) L Davenport	7	6
(Austria) T Paszek	2	0
4	(Russia) E Dementieva	6	6
(Japan) A Morigami	7	6
(Japan) A Nakamura	5	3
(Spain) V Ruano Pascual	0	0
2	(Serbia) J Janković	6	6

Quarterfinals
PR	(United States) L Davenport	7	6
4	(Russia) E Dementieva	6^{1}	1
(Japan) A Morigami	3	5
2	(Serbia) J Janković	6	7

Semifinals
PR	(United States) L Davenport	3	5
2	(Serbia) J Janković	6	7

== Qualifying ==
=== Seeds ===
1. (Argentina) María Emilia Salerni (qualifying competition, Lucky loser)
2. (Colombia) Catalina Castaño (qualifying competition)
3. (Chinese Taipei) Hsieh Su-wei (qualifying competition)
4. (China) Yuan Meng (qualifying competition, retired)
5. (United States) Julie Ditty (qualified)
6. (Uzbekistan) Iroda Tulyaganova (second round)
7. (Japan) Ayumi Morita (first round)
8. (China) Zhang Shuai (first round)

=== Qualifiers ===
1. (United States) Julie Ditty
2. (New Zealand) Marina Erakovic
3. (United States) Abigail Spears
4. (China) Xu Yifan

=== Lucky loser ===
1. (Argentina) María Emilia Salerni

=== Qualifying draw ===
==== First qualifier ====
First round
1	(Argentina) María Emilia Salerni	6	6
WC	(China) Liang Chen	2	1
(Romania) Ágnes Szatmári	6	6
WC	(China) Dong Nan	3	0
WC	(China) Li Ting	1	4
(China) Lu Jingjing	6	6
WC	(China) He Chunyan	0	0
5	(United States) Julie Ditty	6	6

Second round
1	(Argentina) María Emilia Salerni	6	3	6
(Romania) Ágnes Szatmári	1	6	1
(China) Lu Jingjing	1	5
5	(United States) Julie Ditty	6	7

Qualifying competition
1	(Argentina) María Emilia Salerni	5	0
5	(United States) Julie Ditty	7	6

==== Second qualifier ====
First round
2	(Colombia) Catalina Castaño	7^{7}	2	6
(Romania) Anda Perianu	6^{3}	6	4
WC	(China) Wang Qiang	2	3
(France) Sophie Lefèvre	6	6
(New Zealand) Marina Erakovic	6	6
(China) Ren Jing	2	2
(Russia) Alina Jidkova	7	4	2
6	(Uzbekistan) Iroda Tulyaganova	5	6	6

Second round
2	(Colombia) Catalina Castaño	6	6
(France) Sophie Lefèvre	1	3
(New Zealand) Marina Erakovic	6	6
6	(Uzbekistan) Iroda Tulyaganova	4	3

Qualifying competition
2	(Colombia) Catalina Castaño	4	0
(New Zealand) Marina Erakovic	6	6

==== Third qualifier ====
First round
3	(Chinese Taipei) Hsieh Su-wei	7	6
(China) Liu Wanting	5	3
(China) Chen Yanchong	6	6
(China) Song Shanshan	4	4
(Russia) Maria Kondratieva	0	2
(United States) Abigail Spears	6	6
(United States) Raquel Kops-Jones	6	3	6
8	(China) Zhang Shuai	2	6	2

Second round
3	(Chinese Taipei) Hsieh Su-wei	3	7^{9}	6
(China) Chen Yanchong	6	6^{7}	1
(United States) Abigail Spears	6	3	7
(United States) Raquel Kops-Jones	2	6	5

Qualifying competition
3	(Chinese Taipei) Hsieh Su-wei	5	1
(United States) Abigail Spears	7	6

==== Fourth qualifier ====
First round
4	(China) Yuan Meng	3	7	7^{7}
(China) Huang Lei	6	5	6^{1}
WC	(China) Lu Jiaxiang	0	6	3
WC	(China) Zhou Yimiao	6	4	6
(China) Xu Yifan	6	5	7^{7}
(China) Han Xinyun	3	7	6^{5}
WC	(China) Lu Jiajing	6	6
7	(Japan) Ayumi Morita	4	1

Second round
4	(China) Yuan Meng	6	7
WC	(China) Zhou Yimiao	4	5
(China) Xu Yifan	6	6
WC	(China) Lu Jiajing	2	1

Qualifying competition
4	(China) Yuan Meng	4	3^{r}
(China) Xu Yifan	6	5
