= 2005 China Open – Men's doubles =

Men's doubles
- 2005 China Open

Final
- Champions: (United States) Justin Gimelstob (Australia) Nathan Healey
- Runners-up: (Russia) Dmitry Tursunov (Russia) Mikhail Youzhny
- Score: 4–6, 6–3, 6–2

Events
Singles	men	women
Doubles	men	women
- China Open

Justin Gimelstob and Graydon Oliver were the defending champions, but Oliver did not participate this year. Gimelstob partnered Nathan Healey and successfully defended his title.

Gimelstob and Healey won the title, defeating Dmitry Tursunov and Mikhail Youzhny 4–6, 6–3, 6–2 in the final.

== Seeds ==
1. (Australia) Wayne Arthurs / (Australia) Jordan Kerr (semifinals)
2. (Australia) Ashley Fisher / (Sweden) Robert Lindstedt (quarterfinals)
3. (Finland) Jarkko Nieminen / (Germany) Rainer Schüttler (first round)
4. (United States) Huntley Montgomery / (United States) Tripp Phillips (first round)

== Draw ==
Key

- Q = Qualifier
- WC = Wild card
- LL = Lucky loser
- Alt = Alternate
- ITF = ITF entry
- PR = Protected ranking
- SR = Special ranking
- SE = Special exempt
- JE = Junior exempt
- JR = Junior Accelerator Programme entrant
- CO = College Accelerator Programme entrant
- NG = Next Gen Accelerator Program entrant
- w/o = Walkover
- r = Retired
- d = Defaulted

=== Draw ===
First round
1	(Australia) W Arthurs (Australia) J Kerr	6^{7}	6^{8}
WC	(China) XY Yu (China) SX Zeng	5^{5}	5^{6}
WC	(China) P Sun (China) Y Wang	2	3
(Sweden) T Johansson (South Africa) R Koenig	6	6
3	(Finland) J Nieminen (Germany) R Schüttler	6	5^{5}	4
(United States) J Gimelstob (Australia) N Healey	1	6^{7}	6
(Thailand) D Udomchoke (Chinese Taipei) Y-t Wang	6^{7}	6^{10}
Alt	(Switzerland) I Heuberger (Israel) N Okun	5^{5}	5^{8}
(Russia) D Tursunov (Russia) M Youzhny	6	6^{7}
(United States) G Dragicevic (United States) M Pehar	4	5^{4}
(Thailand) Sa Ratiwatana (Thailand) So Ratiwatana	6	6
4	(United States) H Montgomery (United States) T Phillips	4	2
(Germany) L Burgsmüller (South Korea) H-t Lee	6^{7}	4	6^{7}
(United States) N Rainey (United States) B Wilson	5^{4}	6	5^{4}
(Israel) A Hadad (Austria) S Koubek	6	3	4
2	(Australia) A Fisher (Sweden) R Lindstedt	3	6	6

Quarterfinals
1	(Australia) W Arthurs (Australia) J Kerr	6	5^{5}	6^{8}
(Sweden) T Johansson (South Africa) R Koenig	3	6^{7}	5^{6}
(United States) J Gimelstob (Australia) N Healey	6	6
(Thailand) D Udomchoke (Chinese Taipei) Y-t Wang	2	3
(Russia) D Tursunov (Russia) M Youzhny	6	6
(Thailand) Sa Ratiwatana (Thailand) So Ratiwatana	4	4
(Germany) L Burgsmüller (South Korea) H-t Lee	0	6	6^{7}
2	(Australia) A Fisher (Sweden) R Lindstedt	6	2	5^{3}

Semifinals
1	(Australia) W Arthurs (Australia) J Kerr	2	6	5^{6}
(United States) J Gimelstob (Australia) N Healey	6	3	6^{8}
(Russia) D Tursunov (Russia) M Youzhny	6	6
(Germany) L Burgsmüller (South Korea) H-t Lee	4	4

Final
(United States) J Gimelstob (Australia) N Healey	4	6	6
(Russia) D Tursunov (Russia) M Youzhny	6	3	2
