= 2005 China Open – Men's singles =

Men's singles
- 2005 China Open

Final
- Champion: (Spain) Rafael Nadal
- Runner-up: (Argentina) Guillermo Coria
- Score: 5–7, 6–1, 6–2

Events
Singles	men	women
Doubles	men	women
- China Open

Marat Safin was the defending champion, but did not participate this year.

Rafael Nadal won the title, beating Guillermo Coria 5–7, 6–1, 6–2 in the final.

== Seeds ==
1. (Spain) Rafael Nadal (champion)
2. (Argentina) Guillermo Coria (final)
3. (Argentina) David Nalbandian (quarterfinals)
4. (Sweden) Thomas Johansson (semifinals)
5. (Slovakia) ~~Dominik Hrbatý~~ (withdrew)
6. (Spain) Juan Carlos Ferrero (semifinals)
7. (Russia) Mikhail Youzhny (quarterfinals)
8. (Spain) Carlos Moyá (quarterfinals)

== Draw ==
Key

- Q = Qualifier
- WC = Wild card
- LL = Lucky loser
- Alt = Alternate
- ITF = ITF entry
- PR = Protected ranking
- SR = Special ranking
- SE = Special exempt
- JE = Junior exempt
- JR = Junior Accelerator Programme entrant
- CO = College Accelerator Programme entrant
- NG = Next Gen Accelerator Program entrant
- w/o = Walkover
- r = Retired
- d = Defaulted

=== Finals ===
Semifinals
1	(Spain) Rafael Nadal	6	6
6	(Spain) Juan Carlos Ferrero	4	4
4	(Sweden) Thomas Johansson	6	5	2
2	(Argentina) Guillermo Coria	4	7	6

Final
1	(Spain) Rafael Nadal	5	6	6
2	(Argentina) Guillermo Coria	7	1	2

=== Top half ===
First round
1	(Spain) R Nadal	6	6
(Chinese Taipei) Y-t Wang	2	4
(Croatia) R Karanušić	4	1
(United States) J Gimelstob	6	6
(Netherlands) P Wessels	7^{7}	6
(Australia) W Arthurs	6^{5}	4
WC	(China) Y Wang	7^{7}	6
Q	(Slovenia) L Gregorc	6^{5}	1
3	(Argentina) D Nalbandian	6	7^{7}
(Denmark) K Pless	3	6^{2}
(Belgium) D Norman	5	6^{7}
Q	(Israel) A Hadad	7	7^{9}
(Germany) L Burgsmüller	3	4
(Russia) D Tursunov	6	6
(South Korea) H-t Lee	6	3	5
6	(Spain) JC Ferrero	4	6	7

Second round
1	(Spain) R Nadal	5	6	6
(United States) J Gimelstob	7	4	4
(Netherlands) P Wessels	6	7^{11}
WC	(China) Y Wang	1	6^{9}
3	(Argentina) D Nalbandian	6	6
Q	(Israel) A Hadad	4	0
(Russia) D Tursunov	4	6^{4}
6	(Spain) JC Ferrero	6	7^{7}

Quarterfinals
1	(Spain) R Nadal	7^{7}	6
(Netherlands) P Wessels	6^{3}	2
3	(Argentina) D Nalbandian	2	6	3
6	(Spain) JC Ferrero	6	3	6

Semifinals
1	(Spain) R Nadal	6	6
6	(Spain) JC Ferrero	4	4

=== Bottom half ===
First round
8	(Spain) C Moyá	7^{8}	6
(Thailand) P Srichaphan	6^{6}	3
(Switzerland) I Heuberger	3	6^{6}
(Austria) S Koubek	6	7^{8}
(Germany) R Schüttler	4	2
(Finland) J Nieminen	6	6
WC	(Sweden) J Björkman	4	3
4	(Sweden) T Johansson	6	6
7	(Russia) M Youzhny	7	6
Q	(Australia) N Healey	5	4
(Thailand) D Udomchoke	7^{7}	3	6
(Israel) N Okun	6^{4}	6	4
WC	(China) P Sun	4	7	4
LL	(Japan) T Matsui	6	5	6
Q	(China) SX Zeng	2	1
2	(Argentina) G Coria	6	6

Second round
8	(Spain) C Moyá	3	6	6
(Austria) S Koubek	6	3	2
(Finland) J Nieminen	4	4
4	(Sweden) T Johansson	6	6
7	(Russia) M Youzhny	7	6
(Thailand) D Udomchoke	5	1
LL	(Japan) T Matsui	1	0
2	(Argentina) G Coria	6	6

Quarterfinals
8	(Spain) C Moyá	6^{3}	3
4	(Sweden) T Johansson	7^{7}	6
7	(Russia) M Youzhny	4	6	1
2	(Argentina) G Coria	6	1	6

Semifinals
4	(Sweden) T Johansson	6	5	2
2	(Argentina) G Coria	4	7	6
