= 2005 China Open (tennis) =

- Date: September 12–19 (men); September 19–25 (women)
- Edition: 7th
- Location: Beijing, China

Champions

Men's singles
- (Spain) Rafael Nadal

Women's singles
- (Russia) Maria Kirilenko

Men's doubles
- (United States) Justin Gimelstob / (Australia) Nathan Healey

Women's doubles
- (Spain) Nuria Llagostera Vives / (Venezuela) María Vento-Kabchi
- China Open

The 2005 China Open was an ATP International Series and WTA Tour Tier II tennis tournament held in Beijing, China.

== Finals ==
=== Men's singles ===
(Spain) Rafael Nadal defeated (Argentina) Guillermo Coria, 5–7, 6–1, 6–2

=== Women's singles ===
(Russia) Maria Kirilenko defeated (Germany) Anna-Lena Grönefeld, 6–3, 6–4

=== Men's doubles ===
(United States) Justin Gimelstob / (Australia) Nathan Healey defeated (Russia) Dmitry Tursunov / (Russia) Mikhail Youzhny, 4–6, 6–3, 6–2

=== Women's doubles ===
(Spain) Nuria Llagostera Vives / (Venezuela) María Vento-Kabchi defeated (China) Yan Zi / (China) Zheng Jie, 6–2, 6–4
