= 2003 St. Petersburg Open – Doubles =

Doubles
- 2003 St. Petersburg Open

Final
- Champions: (Austria) Julian Knowle (Serbia and Montenegro) Nenad Zimonjić
- Runners-up: (Germany) Michael Kohlmann (Germany) Rainer Schüttler
- Score: 7–6^{(7–1)}, 6–3

Events
Singles	Doubles
← 2002 ·	St. Petersburg Open	· 2004 →

David Adams and Jared Palmer were the defending champions but did not compete that year.

Julian Knowle and Nenad Zimonjić won in the final 7–6^{(7–1)}, 6–3 against Michael Kohlmann and Rainer Schüttler.

== Seeds ==
1. (India) Mahesh Bhupathi / (Belarus) Max Mirnyi (semifinals)
2. (Czech Republic) František Čermák / (Czech Republic) Leoš Friedl (first round)
3. (Czech Republic) Tomáš Cibulec / (Czech Republic) Pavel Vízner (quarterfinals)
4. (Israel) Jonathan Erlich / (Israel) Andy Ram (quarterfinals)

== Draw ==
=== Key ===
- Q = Qualifier
- WC = Wild card
- LL = Lucky loser
- Alt = Alternate
- SE = Special exempt
- PR = Protected ranking
- ITF = ITF entry
- JE = Junior exempt
- w/o = Walkover
- r = Retired
- d = Defaulted
- SR = Special ranking

First round
1	(India) M Bhupathi (Belarus) M Mirnyi	7	6
WC	(Russia) V Davletshin (Russia) M Elgin	5	3
WC	(Israel) H Levy (Russia) M Youzhny	7^{9}	6
(Germany) N Kiefer (Romania) A Pavel	6^{7}	2
4	(Israel) J Erlich (Israel) A Ram	4	7^{7}	6
(Germany) K Braasch (Armenia) S Sargsian	6	6^{5}	1
(Czech Republic) P Luxa (Czech Republic) D Škoch	4	6^{5}
(Austria) J Knowle (Serbia and Montenegro) N Zimonjić	6	7^{7}
(France) A Dupuis (Russia) A Olhovskiy	2	5
(Germany) M Kohlmann (Germany) R Schüttler	6	7
(Russia) Y Kafelnikov (Czech Republic) R Štěpánek	3	0
3	(Czech Republic) T Cibulec (Czech Republic) P Vízner	6	6
(Slovakia) D Hrbatý (Belgium) T Vanhoudt	4	4
(Argentina) M García (Argentina) S Prieto	6	6
(Georgia (country)) I Labadze (Russia) M Safin	7^{7}	6
2	(Czech Republic) F Čermák (Czech Republic) L Friedl	6^{5}	4

Quarterfinals
1	(India) M Bhupathi (Belarus) M Mirnyi	2	6	6
WC	(Israel) H Levy (Russia) M Youzhny	6	3	3
(Israel) J Erlich (Israel) A Ram	6	3	3
(Austria) J Knowle (Serbia and Montenegro) N Zimonjić	4	6	6
(Germany) M Kohlmann (Germany) R Schüttler	7^{7}	6
3	(Czech Republic) T Cibulec (Czech Republic) P Vízner	6^{3}	2
(Argentina) M García (Argentina) S Prieto	w/o
(Georgia (country)) I Labadze (Russia) M Safin

Semifinals
1	(India) M Bhupathi (Belarus) M Mirnyi	4	4
(Austria) J Knowle (Serbia and Montenegro) N Zimonjić	6	6
(Germany) M Kohlmann (Germany) R Schüttler	6	6
(Argentina) M García (Argentina) S Prieto	4	4

Final
(Austria) J Knowle (Serbia and Montenegro) N Zimonjić	7^{7}	6
(Germany) M Kohlmann (Germany) R Schüttler	6^{1}	3
