= 2002 St. Petersburg Open – Doubles =

Doubles
- 2002 St. Petersburg Open

Final
- Champions: (South Africa) David Adams (United States) Jared Palmer
- Runners-up: (Georgia (country)) Irakli Labadze (Russia) Marat Safin
- Score: 7–6^{(10–8)}, 6–3

Events
Singles	Doubles
← 2001 ·	St. Petersburg Open	· 2003 →

Denis Golovanov and Yevgeny Kafelnikov were the defending champions but lost in the quarterfinals to Irakli Labadze and Marat Safin.

David Adams and Jared Palmer won in the final 7–6^{(10–8)}, 6–3 against Labadze and Safin.

== Seeds ==
1. (India) Mahesh Bhupathi / (Federal Republic of Yugoslavia) Nenad Zimonjić (first round)
2. (South Africa) David Adams / (United States) Jared Palmer (champions)
3. (Australia) Michael Hill / (India) Leander Paes (first round)
4. (Czech Republic) Petr Pála / (Czech Republic) David Rikl (quarterfinals)

== Draw ==
=== Key ===
- Q = Qualifier
- WC = Wild card
- LL = Lucky loser
- Alt = Alternate
- SE = Special exempt
- PR = Protected ranking
- ITF = ITF entry
- JE = Junior exempt
- w/o = Walkover
- r = Retired
- d = Defaulted
- SR = Special ranking

First round
1	(India) M Bhupathi (Federal Republic of Yugoslavia) N Zimonjić	3	5
(Germany) K Braasch (United States) J Tarango	6	7
(Czech Republic) T Cibulec (Czech Republic) L Friedl	2	6	3
(Czech Republic) P Luxa (Czech Republic) D Škoch	6	2	6
3	(Australia) M Hill (India) L Paes	3	7^{7}	3
(Georgia (country)) I Labadze (Russia) M Safin	6	6^{4}	6
(Russia) D Golovanov (Russia) Y Kafelnikov	3	6	6
(Austria) J Knowle (Germany) M Kohlmann	6	3	1
WC	(Germany) N Kiefer (Romania) A Pavel	6	6
WC	(Russia) M Elgin (Russia) A Stoliarov	0	4
(Morocco) Y El Aynaoui (Croatia) I Ljubičić	2	3
4	(Czech Republic) P Pála (Czech Republic) D Rikl	6	6
WC	(Belarus) V Voltchkov (Russia) M Youzhny	6^{4}	3
(Sweden) S Aspelin (Russia) A Olhovskiy	7^{7}	6
(Czech Republic) F Čermák (Czech Republic) O Fukárek	3	4
2	(South Africa) D Adams (United States) J Palmer	6	6

Quarterfinals
(Germany) K Braasch (United States) J Tarango	3	4
(Czech Republic) P Luxa (Czech Republic) D Škoch	6	6
(Georgia (country)) I Labadze (Russia) M Safin	7	7
(Russia) D Golovanov (Russia) Y Kafelnikov	5	5
WC	(Germany) N Kiefer (Romania) A Pavel	6	6
4	(Czech Republic) P Pála (Czech Republic) D Rikl	0	4
(Sweden) S Aspelin (Russia) A Olhovskiy	2	4
2	(South Africa) D Adams (United States) J Palmer	6	6

Semifinals
(Czech Republic) P Luxa (Czech Republic) D Škoch	2	2
(Georgia (country)) I Labadze (Russia) M Safin	6	6
WC	(Germany) N Kiefer (Romania) A Pavel	6^{7}	4
2	(South Africa) D Adams (United States) J Palmer	7^{9}	6

Final
(Georgia (country)) I Labadze (Russia) M Safin	6^{8}	3
2	(South Africa) D Adams (United States) J Palmer	7^{10}	6
