= 2004 St. Petersburg Open – Doubles =

Doubles
- 2004 St. Petersburg Open

Final
- Champions: (France) Arnaud Clément (France) Michaël Llodra
- Runners-up: (Slovakia) Dominik Hrbatý (Czech Republic) Jaroslav Levinský
- Score: 6–3, 6–2

Events
Singles	Doubles
← 2003 ·	St. Petersburg Open	· 2005 →

Julian Knowle and Nenad Zimonjić were the defending champions, but lost in the semifinals this year.

Arnaud Clément and Michaël Llodra won the title, defeating Dominik Hrbatý and Jaroslav Levinský 6–3, 6–2 in the final.

== Seeds ==
1. (Austria) Julian Knowle / (Serbia and Montenegro) Nenad Zimonjić (semifinals)
2. (France) Arnaud Clément / (France) Michaël Llodra (champions)
3. (Czech Republic) František Čermák / (Czech Republic) Leoš Friedl (first round)
4. (Israel) Jonathan Erlich / (Israel) Andy Ram (first round)

== Draw ==
=== Key ===
- Q = Qualifier
- WC = Wild card
- LL = Lucky loser
- Alt = Alternate
- SE = Special exempt
- PR = Protected ranking
- ITF = ITF entry
- JE = Junior exempt
- w/o = Walkover
- r = Retired
- d = Defaulted
- SR = Special ranking

=== Draw ===
First round
1	(Austria) J Knowle (Serbia and Montenegro) N Zimonjić	6	3	6
WC	(Russia) I Kunitsyn (Belarus) V Voltchkov	3	6	2
(United States) M Fish (United States) G Oliver	5	4
(Georgia (country)) I Labadze (Russia) M Safin	7	6
3	(Czech Republic) F Čermák (Czech Republic) L Friedl	3	6	3
(Slovakia) D Hrbatý (Czech Republic) J Levinský	6	1	6
(Russia) I Andreev (Russia) N Davydenko	2^{r}
(Croatia) I Karlović (Armenia) S Sargsian	3
WC	(Russia) M Elgin (Russia) A Mishin	3	4
(South Africa) R Koenig (United States) T Parrott	6	6
Alt	(Belarus) M Mirnyi (Russia) M Youzhny	6	7^{7}
4	(Israel) J Erlich (Israel) A Ram	1	6^{4}
(Switzerland) Y Allegro (Germany) M Kohlmann	6	6
(Poland) M Fyrstenberg (Poland) M Matkowski	4	3
Alt	(Brazil) R Mello (Luxembourg) G Müller	4	6^{5}
2	(France) A Clément (France) M Llodra	6	7^{7}

Quarterfinals
1	(Austria) J Knowle (Serbia and Montenegro) N Zimonjić	6	6
(Georgia (country)) I Labadze (Russia) M Safin	3	4
(Slovakia) D Hrbatý (Czech Republic) J Levinský	2	6	6
(Croatia) I Karlović (Armenia) S Sargsian	6	3	4
(South Africa) R Koenig (United States) T Parrott	4	6^{0}
Alt	(Belarus) M Mirnyi (Russia) M Youzhny	6	7^{7}
(Switzerland) Y Allegro (Germany) M Kohlmann	4	3
2	(France) A Clément (France) M Llodra	6	6

Semifinals
1	(Austria) J Knowle (Serbia and Montenegro) N Zimonjić	6	1	2
(Slovakia) D Hrbatý (Czech Republic) J Levinský	1	6	6
Alt	(Belarus) M Mirnyi (Russia) M Youzhny
2	(France) A Clément (France) M Llodra	w/o

Final
(Slovakia) D Hrbatý (Czech Republic) J Levinský	3	2
2	(France) A Clément (France) M Llodra	6	6
