= 2000 St. Petersburg Open – Doubles =

Doubles
- 2000 St. Petersburg Open

Final
- Champions: (Canada) Daniel Nestor (Zimbabwe) Kevin Ullyett
- Runners-up: (Japan) Thomas Shimada (South Africa) Myles Wakefield
- Score: 7–6^{(7–5)}, 7–5

Events
Singles	Doubles
← 1999 ·	St. Petersburg Open	· 2001 →

Daniel Nestor and Kevin Ullyett won in the final 7–6^{(7–5)}, 7–5 against Thomas Shimada and Myles Wakefield.

== Seeds ==
1. (United States) Alex O'Brien / (United States) Jared Palmer (first round)
2. (Czech Republic) Jiří Novák / (Czech Republic) David Rikl (semifinals)
3. (South Africa) David Adams / (South Africa) John-Laffnie de Jager (quarterfinals)
4. (Canada) Daniel Nestor / (Zimbabwe) Kevin Ullyett (champions)

== Draw ==
=== Key ===
- Q = Qualifier
- WC = Wild card
- LL = Lucky loser
- Alt = Alternate
- SE = Special exempt
- PR = Protected ranking
- ITF = ITF entry
- JE = Junior exempt
- w/o = Walkover
- r = Retired
- d = Defaulted
- SR = Special ranking

First round
1	(United States) A O'Brien (United States) J Palmer	6^{5}	6^{3}
Q	(Slovakia) D Hrbatý (Israel) H Levy	7^{7}	7^{7}
(South Africa) M Barnard (South Africa) R Koenig	4	6^{3}
(Japan) T Shimada (South Africa) M Wakefield	6	7^{7}
3	(South Africa) D Adams (South Africa) J-L de Jager	6	6
WC	(Russia) M Elgin (Russia) I Kornienko	3	4
WC	(Russia) D Golovanov (Russia) M Safin	6	3	6^{5}
(Czech Republic) T Cibulec (Czech Republic) L Friedl	3	6	7^{7}
WC	(Germany) M Commandeur (Germany) R Schüttler	4	3
(South Africa) C Haggard (Czech Republic) C Suk	6	6
(Sweden) N Kulti (United States) J Stark	1	2
4	(Canada) D Nestor (Zimbabwe) K Ullyett	6	6
(Argentina) L Arnold (Argentina) D Orsanic	4	4
(Czech Republic) P Pála (Czech Republic) P Vízner	6	6
LL	(United States) D Bowen (United States) J Thomas	3	3
2	(Czech Republic) J Novák (Czech Republic) D Rikl	6	6

Quarterfinals
Q	(Slovakia) D Hrbatý (Israel) H Levy	6^{4}	4
(Japan) T Shimada (South Africa) M Wakefield	7^{7}	6
3	(South Africa) D Adams (South Africa) J-L de Jager	6	4	3
(Czech Republic) T Cibulec (Czech Republic) L Friedl	2	6	6
(South Africa) C Haggard (Czech Republic) C Suk	6^{4}	4
4	(Canada) D Nestor (Zimbabwe) K Ullyett	7^{7}	6
(Czech Republic) P Pála (Czech Republic) P Vízner	3	3
2	(Czech Republic) J Novák (Czech Republic) D Rikl	6	6

Semifinals
(Japan) T Shimada (South Africa) M Wakefield	7^{7}	5	7^{7}
(Czech Republic) T Cibulec (Czech Republic) L Friedl	6^{5}	7	6^{3}
4	(Canada) D Nestor (Zimbabwe) K Ullyett	3	6	6
2	(Czech Republic) J Novák (Czech Republic) D Rikl	6	4	4

Final
(Japan) T Shimada (South Africa) M Wakefield	6^{5}	5
4	(Canada) D Nestor (Zimbabwe) K Ullyett	7^{7}	7
