= 1999 St. Petersburg Open – Singles =

Singles
- 1999 St. Petersburg Open

Final
- Champion: (Switzerland) Marc Rosset
- Runner-up: (Germany) David Prinosil
- Score: 6–3, 6–4

Events
Singles	Doubles
← 1998 ·	St. Petersburg Open	· 2000 →

Richard Krajicek was the defending champion but did not compete that year.

Marc Rosset won in the final 6–3, 6–3 against David Prinosil.

== Seeds ==
1. (Netherlands) Jan Siemerink (semifinals)
2. (Switzerland) Marc Rosset (champion)
3. (Sweden) Magnus Gustafsson (second round)
4. (Russia) Marat Safin (semifinals)
5. (Czech Republic) Daniel Vacek (first round)
6. (Slovakia) Dominik Hrbatý (quarterfinals)
7. (Romania) Andrei Pavel (quarterfinals)
8. (Italy) Davide Sanguinetti (first round)

== Draw ==
=== Key ===
- Q = Qualifier
- WC = Wild card
- LL = Lucky loser
- Alt = Alternate
- ITF = ITF entry
- PR = Protected ranking
- SR = Special ranking
- SE = Special exempt
- JE = Junior exempt
- JR = Junior Accelerator Programme entrant
- CO = College Accelerator Programme entrant
- NG = Next Gen Accelerator Program entrant
- w/o = Walkover
- r = Retired
- d = Defaulted

=== Finals ===
Semifinals
1	(Netherlands) Jan Siemerink	4	2
(Germany) David Prinosil	6	6
4	(Russia) Marat Safin	3	2
2	(Switzerland) Marc Rosset	6	6

Final
(Germany) David Prinosil	3	4
2	(Switzerland) Marc Rosset	6	6

=== Top half ===
First round
1	(Netherlands) J Siemerink	6	6
(Germany) M Kohlmann	3	4
(Slovakia) J Krošlák	1	6^{3}
Q	(Sweden) F Jonsson	6	7^{7}
(Italy) L Tieleman	3	1^{r}
Q	(Russia) I Kornienko	6	3
(Germany) M-K Goellner	6	7^{7}
8	(Italy) D Sanguinetti	3	6^{5}
3	(Sweden) M Gustafsson	6	3	7
Q	(Russia) I Kunitsyn	1	6	5
(Italy) G Pozzi	4	6	3
(Germany) D Prinosil	6	3	6
WC	(Russia) A Chesnokov	1	3
(Germany) J Knippschild	6	6
(France) G Raoux	7^{8}	6
5	(Czech Republic) D Vacek	6^{6}	4

Second round
1	(Netherlands) J Siemerink	7^{7}	6
Q	(Sweden) F Jonsson	6^{2}	2
Q	(Russia) I Kornienko	3	7^{8}	6
(Germany) M-K Goellner	6	6^{6}	3
3	(Sweden) M Gustafsson	6	3	4
(Germany) D Prinosil	4	6	6
(Germany) J Knippschild	3	6^{4}
(France) G Raoux	6	7^{7}

Quarterfinals
1	(Netherlands) J Siemerink	6	7^{7}	6
Q	(Russia) I Kornienko	7	6^{4}	3
(Germany) D Prinosil	3	7^{7}	6
(France) G Raoux	6	6^{3}	4

Semifinals
1	(Netherlands) J Siemerink	4	2
(Germany) D Prinosil	6	6

=== Bottom half ===
First round
6	(Slovakia) D Hrbatý	6	3	6
(Romania) A Voinea	3	6	3
(Morocco) K Alami	2	7^{9}	3
(France) A Clément	6	6^{7}	6
(Sweden) M Tillström	3	6	6
WC	(Russia) A Cherkasov	6	4	4
(Argentina) G Cañas	2	3
4	(Russia) M Safin	6	6
7	(Romania) A Pavel	6	3	6
Q	(Sweden) J Apell	3	6	4
(Spain) Á Calatrava	6	3	3
(United States) J Tarango	4	6	6
(France) S Grosjean	6^{3}	7^{10}	6
(Czech Republic) M Damm	7^{7}	6^{8}	3
WC	(Russia) S Petrouchevsky	0	2
2	(Switzerland) M Rosset	6	6

Second round
6	(Slovakia) D Hrbatý	6	6
(France) A Clément	2	3
(Sweden) M Tillström	3	4
4	(Russia) M Safin	6	6
7	(Romania) A Pavel	3	6	6
(United States) J Tarango	6	3	2
(France) S Grosjean	2	6^{2}
2	(Switzerland) M Rosset	6	7^{7}

Quarterfinals
6	(Slovakia) D Hrbatý	6^{4}	6^{2}
4	(Russia) M Safin	7^{7}	7^{7}
7	(Romania) A Pavel	1	2
2	(Switzerland) M Rosset	6	6

Semifinals
4	(Russia) M Safin	3	2
2	(Switzerland) M Rosset	6	6
