= 2003 St. Petersburg Open – Singles =

Singles
- 2003 St. Petersburg Open

Final
- Champion: (Brazil) Gustavo Kuerten
- Runner-up: (Armenia) Sargis Sargsian
- Score: 6–4, 6–3

Events
Singles	Doubles
← 2002 ·	St. Petersburg Open	· 2004 →

Sébastien Grosjean was the defending champion but lost in the quarterfinals to Àlex Corretja.

Gustavo Kuerten won in the final 6–4, 6–3 against Sargis Sargsian.

== Seeds ==
1. (Germany) Rainer Schüttler (semifinals)
2. (France) Sébastien Grosjean (quarterfinals)
3. (Brazil) Gustavo Kuerten (champion)
4. (Belarus) Max Mirnyi (first round)
5. (Russia) Mikhail Youzhny (second round)
6. (United States) Vince Spadea (quarterfinals)
7. (Argentina) Gastón Gaudio (second round)
8. (Russia) Marat Safin (first round)

== Draw ==
=== Key ===
- Q = Qualifier
- WC = Wild card
- LL = Lucky loser
- Alt = Alternate
- ITF = ITF entry
- PR = Protected ranking
- SR = Special ranking
- SE = Special exempt
- JE = Junior exempt
- JR = Junior Accelerator Programme entrant
- CO = College Accelerator Programme entrant
- NG = Next Gen Accelerator Program entrant
- w/o = Walkover
- r = Retired
- d = Defaulted

=== Finals ===
Semifinals
1	(Germany) Rainer Schüttler	3	3
(Armenia) Sargis Sargsian	6	6
3	(Brazil) Gustavo Kuerten	6	6
WC	(Spain) Àlex Corretja	4	3

Final
(Armenia) Sargis Sargsian	4	3
3	(Brazil) Gustavo Kuerten	6	6

=== Top half ===
First round
1	(Germany) R Schüttler	7^{7}	6
Q	(Monaco) J-R Lisnard	6^{5}	1
WC	(Russia) V Davletshin	6^{3}	3
(Belarus) V Voltchkov	7^{7}	6
(Germany) N Kiefer	6	3	4
(Russia) Y Kafelnikov	2	6	6
(Romania) A Pavel	7^{7}	6^{1}	1
5	(Russia) M Youzhny	6^{3}	7^{7}	6
4	(Belarus) M Mirnyi	4	6^{1}
WC	(Russia) I Andreev	6	7^{7}
(Armenia) S Sargsian	6	6
(Czech Republic) R Štěpánek	3	2
(Germany) L Burgsmüller	2	7^{8}	6
Q	(Israel) A Ram	6	6^{6}	1
(Spain) F Vicente	6^{2}	6	6
8	(Russia) M Safin	7^{7}	4	3

Second round
1	(Germany) R Schüttler	6	6
(Belarus) V Voltchkov	2	3
(Russia) Y Kafelnikov	2	2
5	(Russia) M Youzhny	6	6
WC	(Russia) I Andreev	3	2
(Armenia) S Sargsian	6	6
(Germany) L Burgsmüller	6	6
(Spain) F Vicente	4	4

Quarterfinals
1	(Germany) R Schüttler	6	6
5	(Russia) M Youzhny	3	3
(Armenia) S Sargsian	6	6
(Germany) L Burgsmüller	3	1

Semifinals
1	(Germany) R Schüttler	3	3
(Armenia) S Sargsian	6	6

=== Bottom half ===
First round
6	(United States) V Spadea	4	6	6
(Russia) N Davydenko	6	1	2
(Spain) D Ferrer	5	2
(Slovakia) D Hrbatý	7	6
(Romania) V Hănescu	7	7
Q	(Czech Republic) F Čermák	5	5
(United States) B Vahaly	6^{5}	4
3	(Brazil) G Kuerten	7^{7}	6
7	(Argentina) G Gaudio	6^{4}	7^{7}	6
(Spain) A Martín	7^{7}	6^{5}	2
Q	(Czech Republic) J Vacek	4	1
WC	(Spain) À Corretja	6	6
(Spain) D Sánchez	2	3
(France) A Dupuis	6	6
(Austria) S Koubek	7^{7}	3	5
2	(France) S Grosjean	6^{4}	6	7

Second round
6	(United States) V Spadea	6	4	7
(Slovakia) D Hrbatý	4	6	5
(Romania) V Hănescu	6^{1}	6^{1}
3	(Brazil) G Kuerten	7^{7}	7^{7}
7	(Argentina) G Gaudio	3	1
WC	(Spain) À Corretja	6	6
(France) A Dupuis	2	2
2	(France) S Grosjean	6	6

Quarterfinals
6	(United States) V Spadea	4	6^{4}
3	(Brazil) G Kuerten	6	7^{7}
WC	(Spain) À Corretja	4	6	7^{7}
2	(France) S Grosjean	6	2	6^{5}

Semifinals
3	(Brazil) G Kuerten	6	6
WC	(Spain) À Corretja	4	3
