= 2001 St. Petersburg Open – Doubles =

Doubles
- 2001 St. Petersburg Open

Final
- Champions: (Russia) Denis Golovanov (Russia) Yevgeny Kafelnikov
- Runners-up: (Georgia (country)) Irakli Labadze (Russia) Marat Safin
- Score: 7–5, 6–4

Events
Singles	Doubles
← 2000 ·	St. Petersburg Open	· 2002 →

Daniel Nestor and Kevin Ullyett were the defending champions but did not compete that year.

Denis Golovanov and Yevgeny Kafelnikov won in the final 7–5, 6–4 against Irakli Labadze and Marat Safin.

== Seeds ==
1. (Czech Republic) Jiří Novák / (Czech Republic) David Rikl (quarterfinals)
2. (Czech Republic) Martin Damm / (Germany) David Prinosil (quarterfinals)
3. (South Africa) David Adams / (Slovakia) Dominik Hrbatý (semifinals)
4. (Japan) Thomas Shimada / (South Africa) Myles Wakefield (semifinals)

== Draw ==
=== Key ===
- Q = Qualifier
- WC = Wild card
- LL = Lucky loser
- Alt = Alternate
- SE = Special exempt
- PR = Protected ranking
- ITF = ITF entry
- JE = Junior exempt
- w/o = Walkover
- r = Retired
- d = Defaulted
- SR = Special ranking

First round
1	(Czech Republic) J Novák (Czech Republic) D Rikl	6	6
(United States) J Gimelstob (United States) J Stark	4	4
WC	(Russia) D Golovanov (Russia) Y Kafelnikov	7	6
(Australia) J Kerr (United States) J Waite	5	2
4	(Japan) T Shimada (South Africa) M Wakefield	6	6
(South Africa) J-L de Jager (South Africa) R Koenig	2	2
WC	(Russia) A Stoliarov (Russia) M Youzhny	6	3	6
(United States) D Bowen (Australia) T Crichton	1	6	3
(Germany) M Kohlmann (Austria) J Knowle	6	6
WC	(Russia) M Elgin (Russia) A Merinov	2	3
(France) M Llodra (Russia) A Olhovskiy	2	4
3	(South Africa) D Adams (Slovakia) D Hrbatý	6	6
WC	(Georgia (country)) I Labadze (Russia) M Safin	7^{7}	6
(Czech Republic) P Luxa (Czech Republic) R Štěpánek	6^{5}	4
(North Macedonia) A Kitinov (Czech Republic) D Vacek	7	4	2
2	(Czech Republic) M Damm (Germany) D Prinosil	5	6	6

Quarterfinals
1	(Czech Republic) J Novák (Czech Republic) D Rikl
WC	(Russia) D Golovanov (Russia) Y Kafelnikov	w/o
4	(Japan) T Shimada (South Africa) M Wakefield	6	6
WC	(Russia) A Stoliarov (Russia) M Youzhny	3	2
(Germany) M Kohlmann (Austria) J Knowle	6	3	4
3	(South Africa) D Adams (Slovakia) D Hrbatý	1	6	6
WC	(Georgia (country)) I Labadze (Russia) M Safin	6	6^{5}	6
2	(Czech Republic) M Damm (Germany) D Prinosil	2	7^{7}	3

Semifinals
WC	(Russia) D Golovanov (Russia) Y Kafelnikov	6	7^{7}
4	(Japan) T Shimada (South Africa) M Wakefield	1	6^{2}
3	(South Africa) D Adams (Slovakia) D Hrbatý	4	6	6^{5}
WC	(Georgia (country)) I Labadze (Russia) M Safin	6	3	7^{7}

Final
WC	(Russia) D Golovanov (Russia) Y Kafelnikov	7	6
WC	(Georgia (country)) I Labadze (Russia) M Safin	5	4
