= 2002 St. Petersburg Open =

- Date: 21–27 October
- Edition: 8th
- Category: International Series
- Draw: 32S / 16D
- Prize money: $975,000
- Surface: Hard / indoor
- Location: St. Petersburg, Russia
- Venue: Petersburg Sports and Concert Complex

Champions

Singles
- (France) Sébastien Grosjean

Doubles
- (South Africa) David Adams / (United States) Jared Palmer
← 2001 ·	St. Petersburg Open	· 2003 →

The 2002 St. Petersburg Open was a tennis tournament played on indoor hard courts at the Petersburg Sports and Concert Complex in Saint Petersburg in Russia and was part of the International Series of the 2002 ATP Tour. The tournament ran from October 21 through October 27, 2002.

== Finals ==
=== Singles ===
(France) Sébastien Grosjean defeated (Russia) Mikhail Youzhny 7–5, 6–4

- It was Grosjean's 2nd title of the year and the 5th of his career.

=== Doubles ===
(South Africa) David Adams / (United States) Jared Palmer defeated (Georgia (country)) Irakli Labadze / (Russia) Marat Safin 7–6^{(10–8)}, 6–3

- It was Adams' 2nd title of the year and the 18th of his career. It was Palmer's 3rd title of the year and the 26th of his career.
