= 2002 St. Petersburg Open – Singles =

Singles
- 2002 St. Petersburg Open

Final
- Champion: (France) Sébastien Grosjean
- Runner-up: (Russia) Mikhail Youzhny
- Score: 7–5, 6–4

Events
Singles	Doubles
← 2001 ·	St. Petersburg Open	· 2003 →

Marat Safin was the defending champion, but lost in the second round to Vladimir Voltchkov.

Sébastien Grosjean won in the final 7–5, 6–4 against Mikhail Youzhny.

== Seeds ==
1. (United States) Andre Agassi (second round)
2. (Russia) Marat Safin (second round)
3. (France) Sébastien Grosjean (champion)
4. (Czech Republic) ~~Jiří Novák~~ (withdrew because of a hamstring injury)
5. (Russia) Yevgeny Kafelnikov (second round)
6. (Morocco) Younes El Aynaoui (first round)
7. (Argentina) Gastón Gaudio (quarterfinals)
8. (Belarus) Max Mirnyi (second round)
9. (Romania) Andrei Pavel (quarterfinals)

== Draw ==
Key

- Q = Qualifier
- WC = Wild card
- LL = Lucky loser
- Alt = Alternate
- ITF = ITF entry
- PR = Protected ranking
- SR = Special ranking
- SE = Special exempt
- JE = Junior exempt
- JR = Junior Accelerator Programme entrant
- CO = College Accelerator Programme entrant
- NG = Next Gen Accelerator Program entrant
- w/o = Walkover
- r = Retired
- d = Defaulted

=== Finals ===
Semifinals
(Slovakia) Karol Kučera	3	2
3	(France) Sébastien Grosjean	6	6
(Russia) Mikhail Youzhny	6	6
WC	(Belarus) Vladimir Voltchkov	4	3

Final
3	(France) Sébastien Grosjean	7	6
(Russia) Mikhail Youzhny	5	4

=== Top half ===
First round
1	(United States) A Agassi	6	6
(Czech Republic) R Štěpánek	3	4
(Slovakia) K Kučera	6^{6}	6	6
(Spain) F López	7^{8}	3	2
(France) A Dupuis	5	6	6^{2}
WC	(Russia) A Stoliarov	7	3	7^{7}
Q	(Belarus) A Shvets	5	5
7	(Argentina) G Gaudio	7	7
3	(France) S Grosjean	6	6
(Armenia) S Sargsian	4	4
(Argentina) M Zabaleta	3	6	6
(Austria) S Koubek	6	2	4
(Slovakia) D Hrbatý	3	6	6
(Czech Republic) B Ulihrach	6	3	4
LL	(Germany) M Kohlmann	6^{4}	0
5	(Russia) Y Kafelnikov	7^{7}	6

Second round
1	(United States) A Agassi	4	4
(Slovakia) K Kučera	6	6
WC	(Russia) A Stoliarov	5	1
7	(Argentina) G Gaudio	7	6
3	(France) S Grosjean	6	6
(Argentina) M Zabaleta	3	1
(Slovakia) D Hrbatý	7^{7}	7
5	(Russia) Y Kafelnikov	6^{1}	5

Quarterfinals
(Slovakia) K Kučera	2	6	6
7	(Argentina) G Gaudio	6	4	3
3	(France) S Grosjean	4	6	6
(Slovakia) D Hrbatý	6	3	2

Semifinals
(Slovakia) K Kučera	3	2
3	(France) S Grosjean	6	6

=== Bottom half ===
First round
6	(Morocco) Y El Aynaoui	6	4	3
(Russia) M Youzhny	3	6	6
(Croatia) I Ljubičić	2	3
(Argentina) G Coria	6	6
Q	(Finland) T Ketola	6	6
(Spain) A Martín	2	3
Q	(Georgia (country)) I Labadze	1	3
9	(Romania) A Pavel	6	6
8	(Belarus) M Mirnyi	6	6
(Czech Republic) J Vacek	3	4
(Germany) N Kiefer	6	6
(Israel) H Levy	0	1
WC	(Russia) M Elgin	4	0
WC	(Belarus) V Voltchkov	6	6
Q	(France) C Saulnier	6^{5}	7^{7}	3
2	(Russia) M Safin	7^{7}	6^{2}	6

Second round
(Russia) M Youzhny	6	3	6
(Argentina) G Coria	4	6	4
Q	(Finland) T Ketola	2	4
9	(Romania) A Pavel	6	6
8	(Belarus) M Mirnyi	3	5
(Germany) N Kiefer	6	7
WC	(Belarus) V Voltchkov	6	6
2	(Russia) M Safin	4	4

Quarterfinals
(Russia) M Youzhny	6	6
9	(Romania) A Pavel	1	3
(Germany) N Kiefer	5	5
WC	(Belarus) V Voltchkov	7	7

Semifinals
(Russia) M Youzhny	6	6
WC	(Belarus) V Voltchkov	4	3
