= 2004 St. Petersburg Open =

- Date: 25–31 October
- Edition: 10th
- Category: International Series
- Draw: 32S / 16D
- Prize money: $975,000
- Surface: Hard / indoor
- Location: St. Petersburg, Russia
- Venue: Petersburg Sports and Concert Complex

Champions

Singles
- (Russia) Mikhail Youzhny

Doubles
- (France) Arnaud Clément / (France) Michaël Llodra
| ← 2003 · | St. Petersburg Open | · 2005 → |

The 2004 St. Petersburg Open was a tennis tournament played on indoor hard courts at the Petersburg Sports and Concert Complex in Saint Petersburg in Russia and was part of the International Series of the 2004 ATP Tour. It was the 10th edition of the tournament wand was held from October 25 through October 31, 2004.

== Finals ==
=== Singles ===
(Russia) Mikhail Youzhny defeated (Slovakia) Karol Beck 6–2, 6–2

=== Doubles ===
(France) Arnaud Clément / (France) Michaël Llodra defeated (Slovakia) Dominik Hrbatý / (Czech Republic) Jaroslav Levinský 6–3, 6–2
