= Andrei Mishin =

Russian tennis player

- Full name: Andrey Alekseevich Mishin
- Country (sports): Russia
- Born: 18 September 1976 (age 48); Leningrad, Soviet Union

Doubles
- Career record: 0–1
- Highest ranking: No. 573 (1 Nov 2004)

Andrey Alekseevich Mishin (born 18 September 1976) is a Russian former professional tennis player.

A Saint Petersburg native, Mishin has a background in the sport of figure skating. He was a figure skater in his younger years and is the son of Alexei Mishin, an Olympic figure skater who became a famous coach, tutoring the likes of Evgeni Plushenko. His brother, Nikolay, also played tennis professionally.

Mishin never competed on the international tennis tour, only featuring in events held in his home city. In 2004 he teamed up with Mikhail Elgin to win a Challenger doubles title in Saint Petersburg and two-months later the pair received a wildcard to compete at the St. Petersburg Open, an ATP Tour event.

Now working as a tennis coach, Mishin is married to one of his pupils, WTA Tour player Daria Mishina (née Mironova).

== ATP Challenger titles ==
=== Doubles: (1) ===
No.	Date	Tournament	Surface	Partner	Opponents	Score
1.	Aug 2004	St. Petersburg Challenger, St. Petersburg, Russia	Clay	(Russia) Mikhail Elgin	(Italy) Daniele Giorgini (Italy) Simone Vagnozzi	6–3, 5–7, 6–4
