= 1999 St. Petersburg Open – Doubles =

Doubles
- 1999 St. Petersburg Open

Final
- Champions: (United States) Jeff Tarango (Czech Republic) Daniel Vacek
- Runners-up: (Netherlands) Menno Oosting (Romania) Andrei Pavel
- Score: 3–6, 6–3, 7–5

Events
Singles	Doubles
← 1998 ·	St. Petersburg Open	· 2000 →

Jeff Tarango and Daniel Vacek won in the final 3–6, 6–3, 7–5 against Menno Oosting and Andrei Pavel.

== Seeds ==
1. (United States) Jeff Tarango / (Czech Republic) Daniel Vacek (champions)
2. (Czech Republic) Martin Damm / (Czech Republic) Pavel Vízner (first round)
3. (South Africa) Lan Bale / (Australia) Andrew Kratzmann (second round)
4. (United States) Mark Keil / (Sweden) Mikael Tillström (second round)

== Draw ==
=== Key ===
- Q = Qualifier
- WC = Wild card
- LL = Lucky loser
- Alt = Alternate
- SE = Special exempt
- PR = Protected ranking
- ITF = ITF entry
- JE = Junior exempt
- w/o = Walkover
- r = Retired
- d = Defaulted
- SR = Special ranking

=== Finals ===
First round
1	(United States) J Tarango (Czech Republic) D Vacek	6	6
(Russia) A Cherkasov (Germany) J Knippschild	3	4
(United Kingdom) D Sapsford (United Kingdom) C Wilkinson	4	4
Q	(France) S Grosjean (France) C Saulnier	6	6
3	(South Africa) L Bale (Australia) A Kratzmann	6	6	7
WC	(Russia) A Olhovskiy (France) G Raoux	7	4	6
(Italy) M Bertolini (Italy) C Brandi	6	6
(Netherlands) T Kempers (Netherlands) J Siemerink	7	7
(Netherlands) M Oosting (Romania) A Pavel	7	6	7
(Australia) G Silcock (South Africa) M Wakefield	6	7	6
LL	(Russia) S Gaidinov (Russia) K Pugaev	2	1
4	(United States) M Keil (Sweden) M Tillström	6	6
(Netherlands) S Noteboom (Netherlands) F Wibier	2	7	6
(South Africa) M Barnard (Slovakia) D Hrbatý	6	6	7
WC	(Switzerland) M Rosset (Russia) M Safin	7	6
2	(Czech Republic) M Damm (Czech Republic) P Vízner	6	1

Quarterfinals
1	(United States) J Tarango (Czech Republic) D Vacek	6	6
Q	(France) S Grosjean (France) C Saulnier	1	2
3	(South Africa) L Bale (Australia) A Kratzmann	4	6	2
(Netherlands) T Kempers (Netherlands) J Siemerink	6	4	6
(Netherlands) M Oosting (Romania) A Pavel	7	6
4	(United States) M Keil (Sweden) M Tillström	6	3
(South Africa) M Barnard (Slovakia) D Hrbatý	6	6
WC	(Switzerland) M Rosset (Russia) M Safin	3	3

Semifinals
1	(United States) J Tarango (Czech Republic) D Vacek	6	5	6
(Netherlands) T Kempers (Netherlands) J Siemerink	2	7	3
(Netherlands) M Oosting (Romania) A Pavel	3	7	6
(South Africa) M Barnard (Slovakia) D Hrbatý	6	5	1

Final
1	(United States) J Tarango (Czech Republic) D Vacek	3	6	7
(Netherlands) M Oosting (Romania) A Pavel	6	3	5
