= 2001 St. Petersburg Open – Singles =

Singles
- 2001 St. Petersburg Open

Final
- Champion: (Russia) Marat Safin
- Runner-up: (Germany) Rainer Schüttler
- Score: 3–6, 6–3, 6–3

Events
Singles	Doubles
- St. Petersburg Open

Marat Safin was the defending champion and won in the final 3–6, 6–3, 6–3 against Rainer Schüttler.

== Seeds ==
1. (Spain) Juan Carlos Ferrero (first round)
2. (Russia) Yevgeny Kafelnikov (semifinals)
3. (Russia) Marat Safin (champion)
4. (Germany) Tommy Haas (first round)
5. (Croatia) Goran Ivanišević (quarterfinals)
6. (France) Fabrice Santoro (quarterfinals)
7. (United Kingdom) Greg Rusedski (second round)
8. (France) Nicolas Escudé (first round)

== Draw ==
Key

- Q = Qualifier
- WC = Wild card
- LL = Lucky loser
- Alt = Alternate
- ITF = ITF entry
- PR = Protected ranking
- SR = Special ranking
- SE = Special exempt
- JE = Junior exempt
- JR = Junior Accelerator Programme entrant
- CO = College Accelerator Programme entrant
- NG = Next Gen Accelerator Program entrant
- w/o = Walkover
- r = Retired
- d = Defaulted

=== Finals ===
Semifinals
(Germany) Rainer Schüttler	6	6
Q	(France) Michaël Llodra	3	4
3	(Russia) Marat Safin	6^{4}	6	6
2	(Russia) Yevgeny Kafelnikov	7^{7}	2	4

Final
(Germany) Rainer Schüttler	6	3	3
3	(Russia) Marat Safin	3	6	6

=== Top half ===
First round
1	(Spain) J C Ferrero	6^{8}	4
(Germany) R Schüttler	7^{10}	6
(Czech Republic) D Vacek	6	7^{7}
(Belgium) O Rochus	3	6^{3}
(Czech Republic) J Novák	0	6^{4}
(Belarus) M Mirnyi	6	7^{7}
(Russia) A Stoliarov	1	4
7	(United Kingdom) G Rusedski	6	6
4	(Germany) T Haas	6	6^{7}	4
WC	(Ukraine) A Medvedev	3	7^{9}	6
(Austria) S Koubek	6	7^{7}
(Czech Republic) J Vaněk	1	6^{0}
Q	(France) M Llodra	6	7^{7}
(Slovakia) D Hrbatý	3	6^{3}
(Belarus) V Voltchkov	6	7^{7}
8	(France) N Escudé	2	6^{4}

Second round
(Germany) R Schüttler	6	6
(Czech Republic) D Vacek	2	4
(Belarus) M Mirnyi	7^{14}	6
7	(United Kingdom) G Rusedski	6^{12}	4
WC	(Ukraine) A Medvedev	6^{3}	2
(Austria) S Koubek	7^{7}	6
Q	(France) M Llodra	7^{7}	6
(Belarus) V Voltchkov	6^{1}	2

Quarterfinals
(Germany) R Schüttler	7	6
(Belarus) M Mirnyi	5	3
(Austria) S Koubek	3	3
Q	(France) M Llodra	6	6

Semifinals
(Germany) R Schüttler	6	6
Q	(France) M Llodra	3	4

=== Bottom half ===
First round
WC/5	(Croatia) G Ivanišević	6	6
(Chile) N Massú	2	3
(Spain) F Mantilla	6	7^{7}
Q	(Georgia (country)) I Labadze	4	6^{3}
(Germany) L Burgsmüller	6	3	4
(Spain) A Martín	4	6	6
(Germany) D Prinosil	4	2
3	(Russia) M Safin	6	6
6	(France) F Santoro	6	6
WC	(Russia) M Elgin	4	3
(Spain) J Díaz	4	5
Q	(Hungary) A Sávolt	6	7
(Russia) M Youzhny	7	7
(Spain) Á Calatrava	5	5
Q	(Armenia) S Sargsian	6^{3}	2
2	(Russia) Y Kafelnikov	7^{7}	6

Second round
WC/5	(Croatia) G Ivanišević	7^{10}	7
(Spain) F Mantilla	6^{8}	5
(Spain) A Martín	7^{8}	4	6^{6}
3	(Russia) M Safin	6^{6}	6	7^{8}
6	(France) F Santoro	7	2	6
Q	(Hungary) A Sávolt	5	6	3
(Russia) M Youzhny	7^{7}	6^{6}	5
2	(Russia) Y Kafelnikov	6^{1}	7^{8}	7

Quarterfinals
WC/5	(Croatia) G Ivanišević	3	6^{0}
3	(Russia) M Safin	6	7^{7}
6	(France) F Santoro	1	4
2	(Russia) Y Kafelnikov	6	6

Semifinals
3	(Russia) M Safin	6^{4}	6	6
2	(Russia) Y Kafelnikov	7^{7}	2	4
