= 2001 St. Petersburg Open =

- Date: 22–28 October
- Edition: 7th
- Category: International Series
- Draw: 32S / 16D
- Prize money: $775,000
- Surface: Hard / indoor
- Location: St. Petersburg, Russia
- Venue: Petersburg Sports and Concert Complex

Champions

Singles
- (Russia) Marat Safin

Doubles
- (Russia) Denis Golovanov / (Russia) Yevgeny Kafelnikov
← 2000 ·	St. Petersburg Open	· 2002 →

The 2001 St. Petersburg Open was a tennis tournament played on indoor hard courts at the Petersburg Sports and Concert Complex in Saint Petersburg in Russia and was part of the International Series of the 2001 ATP Tour. The tournament ran from October 22 through October 28, 2001.

== Finals ==
=== Singles ===
(Russia) Marat Safin defeated (Germany) Rainer Schüttler 3–6, 6–3, 6–3

- It was Safin's 3rd title of the year and the 11th of his career.

=== Doubles ===
(Russia) Denis Golovanov / (Russia) Yevgeny Kafelnikov defeated (Georgia (country)) Irakli Labadze / (Russia) Marat Safin 7–5, 6–4

- It was Golovanov's only title of the year and the 1st of his career. It was Kafelnikov's 5th title of the year and the 48th of his career.
