= 2000 St. Petersburg Open – Singles =

Singles
- 2000 St. Petersburg Open

Final
- Champion: (Russia) Marat Safin
- Runner-up: (Slovakia) Dominik Hrbatý
- Score: 2–6, 6–4, 6–4

Events
Singles	Doubles
- St. Petersburg Open

Marc Rosset was the defending champion but lost in the first round 6–1, 3–6, 3–6 against Andrei Stoliarov.

Marat Safin won in the final 2–6, 6–4, 6–4 against Dominik Hrbatý.

== Seeds ==
1. (Russia) Marat Safin (champion)
2. (Russia) Yevgeny Kafelnikov (semifinals)
3. (Slovakia) Dominik Hrbatý (final)
4. (Switzerland) Marc Rosset (first round)
5. (Netherlands) Sjeng Schalken (second round)
6. (Belarus) Max Mirnyi (first round)
7. (Germany) David Prinosil (second round)
8. (Spain) Fernando Vicente (first round)

== Draw ==
Key

- Q = Qualifier
- WC = Wild card
- LL = Lucky loser
- Alt = Alternate
- ITF = ITF entry
- PR = Protected ranking
- SR = Special ranking
- SE = Special exempt
- JE = Junior exempt
- JR = Junior Accelerator Programme entrant
- CO = College Accelerator Programme entrant
- NG = Next Gen Accelerator Program entrant
- w/o = Walkover
- r = Retired
- d = Defaulted

=== Finals ===
Semifinals
1	(Russia) Marat Safin	6	6
(Sweden) Jonas Björkman	4	4
3	(Slovakia) Dominik Hrbatý	7	6
2	(Russia) Yevgeny Kafelnikov	5	3

Final
1	(Russia) Marat Safin	2	6	6
3	(Slovakia) Dominik Hrbatý	6	4	4

=== Top half ===
First round
1	(Russia) M Safin	7^{9}	6
WC	(Russia) I Kornienko	6^{7}	1
(United States) C Woodruff	6^{3}	6	6
Q	(Finland) T Ketola	7^{7}	3	4
(Israel) H Levy	1	3
(Germany) R Schüttler	6	6
(Italy) G Pozzi	6	4	5
7	(Germany) D Prinosil	3	6	7
4	(Switzerland) M Rosset	6	3	4
WC	(Russia) A Stoliarov	1	6	6
(Sweden) J Björkman	6	6
(Spain) A Portas	2	2
(Czech Republic) J Novák	0	2
Q	(United States) J Palmer	6	6
WC	(Croatia) G Ivanišević	6	2	3
5	(Netherlands) S Schalken	3	6	6

Second round
1	(Russia) M Safin	6	6
(United States) C Woodruff	3	1
(Germany) R Schüttler	6	6
7	(Germany) D Prinosil	2	3
WC	(Russia) A Stoliarov	4	3
(Sweden) J Björkman	6	6
Q	(United States) J Palmer	5	6	6
5	(Netherlands) S Schalken	7	3	2

Quarterfinals
1	(Russia) M Safin	6	1	6
(Germany) R Schüttler	4	6	3
(Sweden) J Björkman	6	6
Q	(United States) J Palmer	1	3

Semifinals
1	(Russia) M Safin	6	6
(Sweden) J Björkman	4	4

=== Bottom half ===
First round
6	(Belarus) M Mirnyi	3	4
(Argentina) M Zabaleta	6	6
(Sweden) M Gustafsson	3	2
(Belarus) V Voltchkov	6	6
(Sweden) T Johansson	6	6
(Spain) A Martín	3	3
(Chile) N Massú	3	4
3	(Slovakia) D Hrbatý	6	6
8	(Spain) F Vicente	4	4
(Germany) M Hantschk	6	6
(Spain) Á Calatrava	6	6
(Austria) S Koubek	2	2
(Norway) C Ruud	7	7
Q	(Russia) A Cherkasov	5	5
Q	(Czech Republic) B Ulihrach	3	1
2	(Russia) Y Kafelnikov	6	6

Second round
(Argentina) M Zabaleta	5	2
(Belarus) V Voltchkov	7	6
(Sweden) T Johansson	4	3
3	(Slovakia) D Hrbatý	6	6
(Germany) M Hantschk	3	1
(Spain) Á Calatrava	6	6
(Norway) C Ruud	1	6^{3}
2	(Russia) Y Kafelnikov	6	7^{7}

Quarterfinals
(Belarus) V Voltchkov	2	6	3
3	(Slovakia) D Hrbatý	6	4	6
(Spain) Á Calatrava	3	4
2	(Russia) Y Kafelnikov	6	6

Semifinals
3	(Slovakia) D Hrbatý	7	6
2	(Russia) Y Kafelnikov	5	3
