= 2000 St. Petersburg Open =

- Date: 6–12 November
- Edition: 6th
- Category: International Series
- Draw: 32S / 16D
- Prize money: $775,000
- Surface: Hard / indoor
- Location: St. Petersburg, Russia
- Venue: Petersburg Sports and Concert Complex

Champions

Singles
- (Russia) Marat Safin

Doubles
- (Canada) Daniel Nestor / (Zimbabwe) Kevin Ullyett
← 1999 ·	St. Petersburg Open	· 2001 →

The 2000 St. Petersburg Open was a tennis tournament played on indoor carpet courts at the Petersburg Sports and Concert Complex in Saint Petersburg in Russia and was part of the ATP International Series of the 2000 ATP Tour. The tournament ran from November 6 through November 12, 2000.

== Finals ==
=== Singles ===
(Russia) Marat Safin defeated (Slovakia) Dominik Hrbatý 2–6, 6–4, 6–4

- It was Safin's 6th title of the year and the 7th of his career.

=== Doubles ===
(Canada) Daniel Nestor / (Zimbabwe) Kevin Ullyett defeated (Japan) Thomas Shimada / (South Africa) Myles Wakefield 7–6^{(7–5)}, 7–5

- It was Nestor's 3rd title of the year and the 15th of his career. It was Ullyett's 3rd title of the year and the 10th of his career.
