= 2004 St. Petersburg Open – Singles =

Singles
- 2004 St. Petersburg Open

Final
- Champion: (Russia) Mikhail Youzhny
- Runner-up: (Slovakia) Karol Beck
- Score: 6–2, 6–2

Events
Singles	Doubles
- St. Petersburg Open

Gustavo Kuerten was the defending champion, but did not participate this year.

Mikhail Youzhny won the title, beating Karol Beck 6–2, 6–2 in the final.

== Seeds ==
1. (Russia) Marat Safin (quarterfinals)
2. (Slovakia) Dominik Hrbatý (first round)
3. (United States) Mardy Fish (second round)
4. (Russia) Mikhail Youzhny (champion)
5. (Russia) Nikolay Davydenko (second round)
6. (Spain) David Ferrer (first round)
7. (France) Michaël Llodra (semifinals)
8. (Russia) Igor Andreev (first round)

== Draw ==
Key

- Q = Qualifier
- WC = Wild card
- LL = Lucky loser
- Alt = Alternate
- ITF = ITF entry
- PR = Protected ranking
- SR = Special ranking
- SE = Special exempt
- JE = Junior exempt
- JR = Junior Accelerator Programme entrant
- CO = College Accelerator Programme entrant
- NG = Next Gen Accelerator Program entrant
- w/o = Walkover
- r = Retired
- d = Defaulted

=== Finals ===
Semifinals
7	(France) Michaël Llodra	4	6	1
(Slovakia) Karol Beck	6	2	6
4	(Russia) Mikhail Youzhny	3	6	6
(United Kingdom) Greg Rusedski	6	3	4

Final
(Slovakia) Karol Beck	2	2
4	(Russia) Mikhail Youzhny	6	6

=== Top half ===
First round
1	(Russia) M Safin	7^{7}	3
Q	(Austria) A Peya	6^{5}	1^{r}
(Georgia (country)) I Labadze	6	1	2
(Armenia) S Sargsian	4	6	6
Q	(Germany) M Kohlmann	4	6	6
(France) G Carraz	6	3	4
WC	(Russia) M Elgin	2	2
7	(France) M Llodra	6	6
3	(United States) M Fish	6	6
(Czech Republic) J Hernych	2	4
(Spain) A Martín	0	1
(France) C Saulnier	6	6
(Slovakia) K Beck	6	6
Q	(Czech Republic) J Vaněk	3	2
WC	(Russia) I Kunitsyn	4	7^{7}	4
5	(Russia) N Davydenko	6	6^{5}	6

Second round
1	(Russia) M Safin	6	6
(Armenia) S Sargsian	4	2
Q	(Germany) M Kohlmann	6^{3}	3
7	(France) M Llodra	7^{7}	6
3	(United States) M Fish	7^{8}	4	3
(France) C Saulnier	6^{6}	6	6
(Slovakia) K Beck	6	6^{4}	6
5	(Russia) N Davydenko	1	7^{7}	4

Quarterfinals
1	(Russia) M Safin	4	1
7	(France) M Llodra	6	6
(France) C Saulnier	3	6^{3}
(Slovakia) K Beck	6	7^{7}

Semifinals
7	(France) M Llodra	4	6	1
(Slovakia) K Beck	6	2	6

=== Bottom half ===
First round
8	(Russia) I Andreev	6	1	5
(Luxembourg) G Müller	4	6	7
(France) A Clément	4	6	4
(France) J Benneteau	6	1	6
(Brazil) R Mello	6^{7}	6^{2}
(Belarus) M Mirnyi	7^{9}	7^{7}
Q	(Israel) A Ram	6	6^{3}	6^{4}
4	(Russia) M Youzhny	2	7^{7}	7^{7}
6	(Spain) D Ferrer	3	2
(Czech Republic) R Štěpánek	6	6
WC	(Switzerland) M Rosset	4	3
(United Kingdom) G Rusedski	6	6
(France) P-H Mathieu	4	2
(Spain) À Corretja	6	6
(Croatia) I Karlović	7^{7}	5	6
2	(Slovakia) D Hrbatý	6^{5}	7	4

Second round
(Luxembourg) G Müller	4	5
(France) J Benneteau	6	7
(Belarus) M Mirnyi	5	6	2
4	(Russia) M Youzhny	7	3	6
(Czech Republic) R Štěpánek	6^{1}	6	4
(United Kingdom) G Rusedski	7^{7}	4	6
(Spain) À Corretja	6^{3}	7^{7}	6^{8}
(Croatia) I Karlović	7^{7}	6^{5}	7^{10}

Quarterfinals
(France) J Benneteau	0	1
4	(Russia) M Youzhny	6	6
(United Kingdom) G Rusedski	6	7^{9}
(Croatia) I Karlović	4	6^{7}

Semifinals
4	(Russia) M Youzhny	3	6	6
(United Kingdom) G Rusedski	6	3	4
