= 2003 St. Petersburg Open =

- Date: 20–26 October
- Edition: 9th
- Category: International Series
- Draw: 32S / 16D
- Prize money: $975,000
- Surface: Hard / indoor
- Location: St. Petersburg, Russia
- Venue: Petersburg Sports and Concert Complex

Champions

Singles
- (Brazil) Gustavo Kuerten

Doubles
- (Austria) Julian Knowle / (Serbia and Montenegro) Nenad Zimonjić
← 2002 ·	St. Petersburg Open	· 2004 →

The 2003 St. Petersburg Open was a tennis tournament played on indoor hard courts at the Petersburg Sports and Concert Complex in Saint Petersburg in Russia and was part of the International Series of the 2003 ATP Tour. The tournament ran from October 20 through October 26, 2003.

== Finals ==
=== Men's singles ===
(Brazil) Gustavo Kuerten defeated (Armenia) Sargis Sargsian 6–4, 6–3

- It was Kuerten's 2nd title of the year and the 27th of his career.

=== Men's doubles ===
(Austria) Julian Knowle / (Serbia and Montenegro) Nenad Zimonjić defeated (Germany) Michael Kohlmann / (Germany) Rainer Schüttler 7–6^{(7–1)}, 6–3

- It was Knowle's 2nd title of the year and the 4th of his career. It was Zimonjić's 2nd title of the year and the 7th of his career.
