= Igor Kornienko =

Russian tennis player

- Full name: Igor Kornienko
- Country (sports): Russia
- Born: 16 July 1971 (age 53); Ukraine
- Prize money: $56,014

Singles
- Career record: 2–4
- Highest ranking: No. 310 (22 August 1994)

Doubles
- Career record: 0–1
- Highest ranking: No. 337 (2 May 1994)

Igor Kornienko (born 16 July 1971) is a former professional tennis player from Russia.

He began competing professionally in the early 1990s, as a Russian.

Kornienko reached a best ranking of 310 in the world. His best performance came in his debut ATP Tour main draw appearance, at the 1999 St. Petersburg Open, where he made the quarter-finals. He beat both Laurence Tieleman and Marc-Kevin Goellner, before his run ended in the quarter-finals with a three set loss to world number 20 Jan Siemerink. In 1999 he also featured in the main draws at Munich and Basel. At the 2000 St. Petersburg Open, Kornienko took reigning US Open champion Marat Safin to an opening set tiebreak in a first round loss.
