= Vadim Davletshin =

Russian tennis player

- Country (sports): Russia
- Born: 7 October 1984 (age 40)
- Prize money: $59,503

Singles
- Career record: 0–2 (at ATP Tour level, Grand Slam level, and in Davis Cup)
- Career titles: 1 ITF
- Highest ranking: No. 383 (26 July 2004)

Doubles
- Career record: 1–2 (at ATP Tour level, Grand Slam level, and in Davis Cup)
- Career titles: 1 ITF, 1 Challenger
- Highest ranking: No. 326 (9 August 2004)
- Last updated on: 21 June 2018.

Vadim Davletshin (born 7 October 1984) is a former Russian tennis player.

Davletshin has a career high ATP singles ranking of 383 achieved on 26 July 2004. He also has a career high ATP doubles ranking of 326 achieved on 9 August 2004.

Davletshin made his ATP main draw debut at the 2003 St. Petersburg Open.
