= 1999 St. Petersburg Open =

- Date: 8–14 February
- Edition: 5th
- Category: World Series
- Draw: 32S / 16D
- Prize money: $325,000
- Surface: Carpet / indoor
- Location: St. Petersburg, Russia
- Venue: Petersburg Sports and Concert Complex

Champions

Singles
- (Switzerland) Marc Rosset

Doubles
- (United States) Jeff Tarango / (Czech Republic) Daniel Vacek
- St. Petersburg Open

The 1999 St. Petersburg Open was a tennis tournament played on indoor carpet courts at the Petersburg Sports and Concert Complex in Saint Petersburg in Russia and was part of the World Series of the 1999 ATP Tour. The tournament ran from February 8 through February 14, 1999.

== Finals ==
=== Singles ===
(Switzerland) Marc Rosset defeated (Germany) David Prinosil, 6–3, 6–4.

- It was Rosset's 1st title of the year and the 13th of his career.

=== Doubles ===
(United States) Jeff Tarango / (Czech Republic) Daniel Vacek defeated (Netherlands) Menno Oosting / (Romania) Andrei Pavel, 3–6, 6–3, 7–5.

- It was Tarango's 2nd title of the year and the 8th of his career. It was Vacek's 2nd title of the year and the 22nd of his career.
