= Denis Golovanov =

Russian tennis player

- Country (sports): Russia
- Born: 27 March 1979 (age 47) Sochi, Russia
- Height: 188 cm (6 ft 2 in)
- Turned pro: 1998
- Plays: Left-handed
- Prize money: $223,998

Singles
- Career record: 0–5
- Career titles: 0
- Highest ranking: No. 152 (10 Jun 2002)

Grand Slam singles results
- Wimbledon: 1R (2002)

Doubles
- Career record: 10–11
- Career titles: 1
- Highest ranking: No. 104 (23 Sep 2002)

Grand Slam doubles results
- Australian Open: 1R (2002)
- US Open: 1R (2002)

Denis Yuryevich Golovanov (Дени́с Ю́рьевич Голова́нов; born 27 March 1979) is a former professional tennis player from Russia. In 2002, he won the Hull challenger event, defeating future top 20 players David Ferrer and Ivo Karlović in the first two rounds.

== Career ==
Golovanov failed to make it through qualifying for the 2002 Wimbledon Championships but was given entry into the main draw as a lucky loser, after British wild card James Auckland withdrew with an injury. He faced fellow lucky loser George Bastl in the first round. Bastl, who went on to upset Pete Sampras, defeated Golovanov in straight sets.

The Russian would never win a singles match on the ATP Tour. One of his losses was to Roger Federer at the 2002 Kremlin Cup.

Golovanov did however have some success as a doubles player, with the highlight of his career coming in 2001, when he and Yevgeny Kafelnikov won the St. Petersburg Open. The wild card pairing benefiting from a walkover in the quarter-finals, with top seeds Jiří Novák and David Rikl withdrawing.

He was also a doubles semi-finalist twice, both times partnering his childhood friend Marat Safin, in the 2000 Kremlin Cup and 2002 President's Cup. Safin would later hire Golovanov as his coach.

== ATP career finals ==
=== Doubles: 1 (1–0) ===
Result	W/L	Date	Tournament	Surface	Partner	Opponents	Score
Win	1–0	Oct 2001	St. Petersburg, Russia	Hard	(Russia) Yevgeny Kafelnikov	(Georgia (country)) Irakli Labadze (Russia) Marat Safin	7–5, 6–4

== Challenger titles ==
=== Singles: (1) ===
No.	Year	Tournament	Surface	Opponent	Score
1.	2002	Hull, Great Britain	Carpet	(United Kingdom) Arvind Parmar	6–4, 3–1 RET

=== Doubles: (2) ===
No.	Year	Tournament	Surface	Partner	Opponents	Score
1.	2001	Andorra	Hard	(Finland) Tuomas Ketola	(Spain) Julian Alonso (Spain) Jairo Velasco Jr.	6–3, 6–4
2.	2001	Samarkand, Uzbekistan	Clay	(Russia) Vadim Kutsenko	(Uzbekistan) Oleg Ogorodov (Uzbekistan) Dmitri Tomashevich	6–1, 4–6, 6–4
