= Mikhail Youzhny =

Russian tennis player & coach (born 1982)

Mikhail Youzhny Михаил Южный
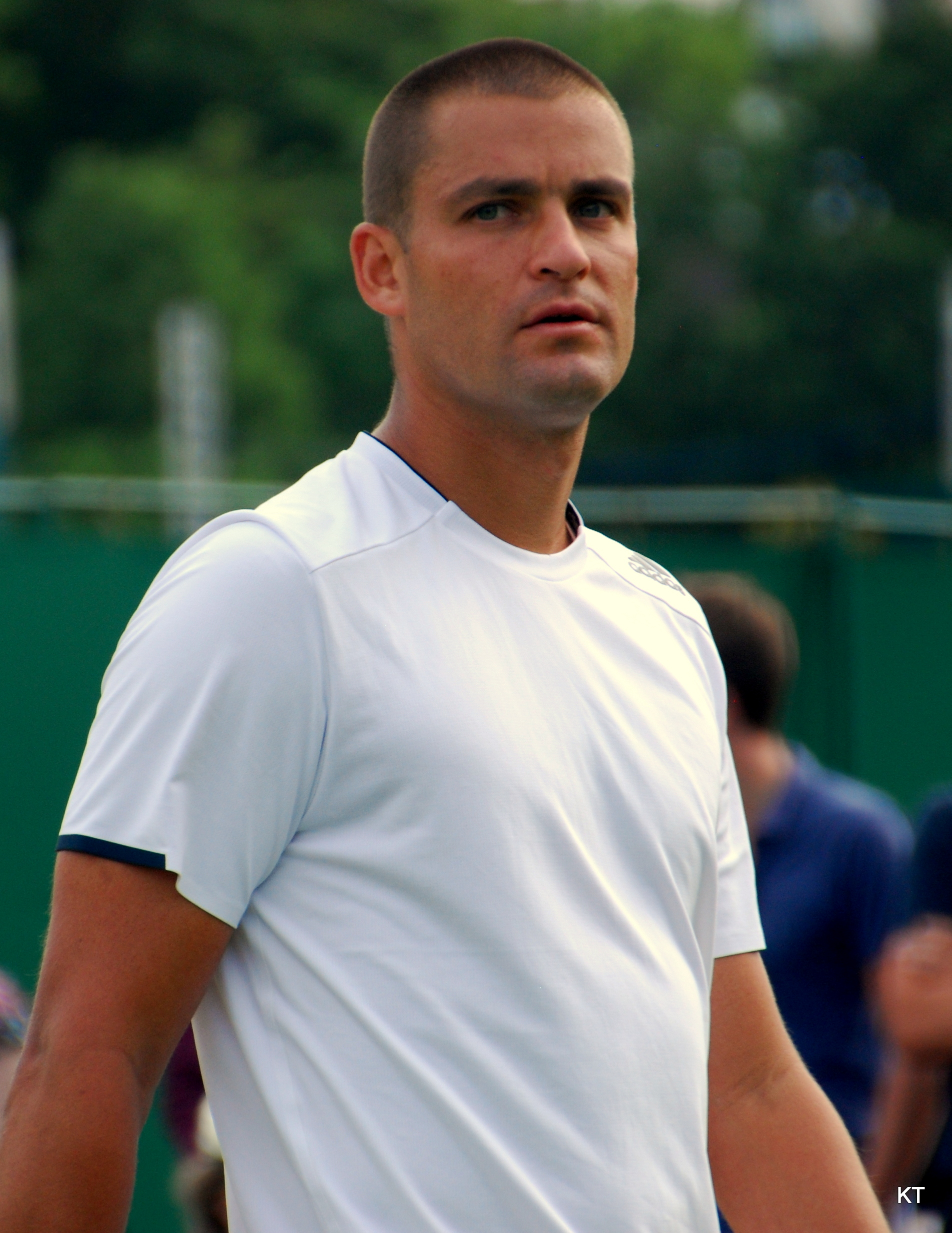
- Youzhny at the 2014 Wimbledon Championships
- Country (sports): Russia
- Residence: Moscow, Russia
- Born: 25 June 1982 (age 44) Moscow, Russian SFSR, Soviet Union
- Height: 1.83 m (6 ft 0 in)
- Turned pro: 1999
- Retired: 2018
- Plays: Right-handed (one-handed backhand)
- Coach: Boris Sobkin (2000–2018)
- Prize money: $14,264,450

Singles
- Career record: 499–416 (54.5%)
- Career titles: 10
- Highest ranking: No. 8 (28 January 2008)

Grand Slam singles results
- Australian Open: QF (2008)
- French Open: QF (2010)
- Wimbledon: QF (2012)
- US Open: SF (2006, 2010)

Other tournaments
- Tour Finals: Alt (2010)
- Olympic Games: QF (2004)

Doubles
- Career record: 154–193 (44.4%)
- Career titles: 9
- Highest ranking: No. 38 (11 April 2011)

Grand Slam doubles results
- Australian Open: QF (2014)
- French Open: 3R (2006)
- Wimbledon: 1R (2004, 2006, 2014, 2015, 2016)
- US Open: QF (2006)

Other doubles tournaments
- Olympic Games: 2R (2012)

Team competitions
- Davis Cup: W (2002, 2006)
- Last updated on: 24 September 2018.

Mikhail Mikhailovich Youzhny (Note: Russian: Михаи́л Миха́йлович Ю́жный, IPA: [mʲɪxɐˈil mʲɪˈxajləvʲɪtɕ ˈjuʐnɨj]) (born 25 June 1982), nicknamed "Misha" and "Colonel" by his fans, is a Russian former professional tennis player who was ranked inside the top 10 and was the Russian No. 1. He achieved a top-10 ranking by the Association of Tennis Professionals (ATP) for the first time on 13 August 2007, and reached a career peak of world No. 8 in January 2008, and again in October 2010.

Youzhny reached the quarterfinals of all majors, reaching the semifinals at the US Open in 2006 and 2010. The closest he came to a major final was at the 2006 US Open semifinals when he took the first set from world No. 9 Andy Roddick, after upsetting world No. 2 Rafael Nadal in the quarterfinals. At the other semifinal he lost in straight sets to the eventual champion, Nadal. Youzhny reached the finals of 21 ATP Tour-level titles, winning ten of them. He reached ATP Tour finals on all surfaces, but never won a singles title on grass. In 2010—his best season—Youzhny reached five ATP finals, winning two and ending the year as a top-10 player.

Youzhny was a member of the winning Russian national team at the Davis Cup in both 2002 and 2006, playing a crucial role in 2002 when he won the deciding rubber after coming back from two-sets-to-love down.

== Early life ==
Youzhny was born on 25 June 1982 to Mikhail, a Soviet army colonel and Lubov, a professional tennis player. 25 June is also his father's birthday. His father sacrificed his career in the Soviet army to steer Youzhny and his older brother Andrei into becoming tennis players. It was because of his father that Boris Sobkin became his coach. At the age of 13, he was a ballboy for a Russia – United States Davis Cup final in Moscow. Youzhny's father was recommended that Mikhail and his brother should join the tennis club Spartak Club if they wanted to become professional players. Mikhail and Andrei had to travel on an underground metro train and then on two buses to reach their destination, taking well over an hour to reach the club. His mother had to take a part-time job to pay for their club membership fees.

At Spartak Club, Youzhny, along with many others his age, would watch Andrei Chesnokov, a former top-10 player, practice for hours. However, his parents had difficulty finding a good coach for Mikhail and Andrei. According to Mikhail, "It was not so easy. In the beginning me and Andrei would watch how coaches were working with students. Then we would make our own drills with a bag of old balls that we collected." Remembering Youzhny's early years, Sobkin said, "Mischa and Andrei were practising together all the time without [a] coach". Sobkin continued:

"In the beginning, Mischa is all the time breaking racquets and crying. Not so many coaches want to work with boy with strong character like this. So, they would practise on one court for 15 minutes and then comes a member so they must leave court immediately and move to another court. Ten minutes maybe 20 minutes later comes another member and like this all day. There was something in Mischa's eyes, a sparkle, maybe, I don't know. Sometimes the eyes tells more than parents. Of course, I did not see Mischa is Top 10 player then. But I could see he had something special."

== Career ==
=== Juniors: 1995, 1997–2000 ===
Youzhny played in his first junior tournament in April 1995 at the 8th Sochi International Junior Tournament, but lost in the first round to Andrei Stoliarov. He next played in a junior tournament—the Ozerov Cup—in 1997, where he reached the semifinals but lost to Belarusian Maxim Belski. In the quarterfinals, Youzhny beat Nikolay Davydenko. He also played doubles at the tournament, partnering with Davydenko; he reached the finals but lost to Belski and Igor Kunitsyn. Youzhny's first junior tournament win came in August 1997, where he partnered with Igor Kunitsyn and defeated Josef Neštický and Igor Ogrinc.

Youzhny first won a junior singles tournament in February 1998, defeating Frantisek Babej in the final. At Wimbledon, his first junior grand slam event, he lost to Andrej Kračman in the first round. At the US Open, he lost in the third round to David Nalbandian. At the junior Australian Open Youzhny defeated second-seed Jarkko Nieminen on his way to the final, which he lost in straight sets to Kristian Pless. Youzhny reached his highest junior world ranking of No. 20 in January 2000.

=== Early career: 2000–2003 ===
Youzhny began 2000 ranked 288 in the world. He reached his first ATP Challenger final in Cherbourg, France, but lost to Julien Boutter, then ranked 162 in the world. In May that year, Youzhny won his first ATP Challenger title in Samarkand, Uzbekistan, by defeating Jan Frode Andersen from Norway. His good form continued and he won his first ATP tour-level match at the 2000 edition of the Rosmalen Grass Court Championships by defeating 154-ranked Canadian Daniel Nestor. He lost to the runner-up Nicolas Escudé. At the Kremlin Cup tournament in Moscow, Youzhny reached his first ATP tour-level quarterfinals, beating 36-ranked Frenchman Fabrice Santoro and 60-ranked Swede Thomas Johansson, but lost to Marc Rosset, 35th in the world. He ended the year ranked 113 in the world.

2001 saw Youzhny's grand slam debut; at the Australian Open. he reached the third round, where he lost to 49th-ranked Australian Andrew Ilie, who had beaten number nine seed Juan Carlos Ferrero in the second round. He continued his good form into February, reaching his first ATP tour-level semifinals at the 2000 Copenhagen Open, but lost to eventual runner-up Andreas Vinciguerra from Sweden. Playing at his first and only ATP Masters 1000 event that year in Monte Carlo, Youzhny reached the third round; an achievement he never repeated. At his French Open debut he lost in the first round to world number seventy-nine Jacobo Díaz from Spain. At the Queen's Club Championships, Youzhny defeated future world number one Andy Roddick in straight sets, but then lost in the second round to world number 107 Raemon Sluiter. He reached the fourth round at his Wimbledon debut, where he lost to 3rd-seed and runner-up, Australian Patrick Rafter in 4-sets. In between Wimbledon and the US Open, Youzhny competed at two tournaments. At the US Open, he reached the third round, losing to world number ten Pete Sampras in straight sets. Youzhny ended the year ranked 58th in the world.

"I didn't think I had a chance – this is my proudest moment in tennis".
– Youzhny in his victory speech after winning his first career ATP title

2002's season started with a first round loss to fellow Russian Nikolay Davydenko in Doha and a second round loss to Croat Goran Ivanišević in Auckland. At the Australian Open he reached the third round again, this time losing to fellow Russian, and world no. 9 Marat Safin in straight sets. At the Grand Prix Hassan II tournament in Casablanca, Youzhny reached his first ATP tour-level semifinal, but lost to Younes El Aynaoui in straight sets. At the BMW Open in Munich, Youzhny again reached the semifinals, but lost again to El Aynaoui, this time in three sets. This loss was followed up with first round losses at the Hamburg Masters to world number twenty Carlos Moyá and at the French Open to world number fifteen Jiří Novák from the Czech Republic. In the next tournament, Youzhny reached the quarterfinals of the Gerry Weber Open in Halle, Germany, losing to world number ten Roger Federer in straight sets. At Wimbledon, Youzhny reached the fourth round and lost to Australian world number one Lleyton Hewitt—who went on to win the tournament—in a three setter. At the Mercedes Cup in Stuttgart, Youzhny won his first ATP-tour level title in a five-set victory over Argentinian world number nineteen Guillermo Cañas. Youzhny did not participate at the US Open because of a back injury, and was absent from the sports for six weeks. At the Mutua Madrileña Masters in Madrid, Youzhny reached the third round, but lost to world number eight Sébastien Grosjean from France in two sets. Youzhny reached his second ATP 250 final in October at the St. Petersburg Open, but lost to world number seven Sébastien Grosjean. He ended 2002 as world number thirty-two.

Youzhny began the 2003 season with a semifinal appearance at the Qatar Open in Doha, losing to American world number forty-two Jan-Michael Gambill. Youzhny, who was seeded for the first time at a grand slam event, reached the fourth round of the Australian Open losing to world number nine Andy Roddick in five sets after failing to close out the match with a two-set lead. After this defeat Youzhny fell in the first or second round five consecutive times. At the BMW Open in Munich, Youzhny reached the quarterfinals but lost to world number five Roger Federer. At the Hamburg Masters, Youzhny reached the third round by defeating world number ten Jiří Novák in straight sets before losing in the third round to Argentine world number sixteen Guillermo Coria. At the French Open, Youzhny was seeded number twenty-seven, and for the first time in his career he won his first round, but lost in the second round to Attila Sávolt, world number 141 from Hungary, in a five-setter. At the Gerry Weber Open in Halle, Germany, Youzhny reached the semifinals, but lost to Roger Federer. At Wimbledon Youzhny was seeded 16th, and lost—for the first time in his career before the fourth round—to Spain's Feliciano López, ranked number fifty-two in the world, in the second round. Youzhny immediately recovered from his defeat to reach the quarterfinals of the Synsam Swedish Open in Båstad, Sweden, but lost in the quarterfinals at the MercedesCup—in which he was the defending champion—to world number seven Guillermo Coria. At the Western & Southern Financial Group Masters in Cincinnati, Youzhny lost for a third consecutive time to Coria—now ranked world number five. At the US Open he continued his poor form by losing in the first round to world number sixty-four Antony Dupuis from France. However, he reached the semifinals of the Grand Prix de Tennis de Lyon in Lyon, losing to world number six Rainer Schüttler from Germany. At his next tournament, the St. Petersburg Open, he reached the quarterfinals but lost again to Schüttler, this time in straight sets. He ended the season with 29–27 win–loss record, making it his worst season since 2001, and ended the year ranked world number forty-three.

=== Breakthrough: 2004–2007 ===
Youzhny started the 2004 season with a second round defeat by Sargis Sargsian at the Qatar Open in Doha. At the Australian Open, Youzhny lost in the first round to Sébastien Grosjean, but then reached his first quarterfinals of the season at the Indesit ATP Milan Indoor, where he lost to Antony Dupuis. At the Dubai Tennis Championships, he reached his first semifinal of the season after defeating world No. 3 Guillermo Coria in the first round, but lost to Feliciano López in three sets. At the Indian Wells Masters Youzhny beat Mark Philippoussis in the second round, but lost to world No. 5 Andre Agassi in straight sets in round four. At the Hamburg Masters, Youzhny reached his first quarterfinals at an ATP Masters 1000 event. He lost to Ivan Ljubičić in a three setter. His good form continued into the French Open, where he had wins over Dennis van Scheppingen and Andrei Pavel, but was eliminated in the third round by Nicolas Escudé in four sets.

Coming to Wimbledon, Youzhny had won only 2 grass matches and he was upset in the first round by 415 ranked Goran Ivanišević. At the 2004 Summer Olympics in Athens, Youzhny upset Nicolas Kiefer to reach the quarterfinals, but lost to American Mardy Fish in straight sets. His next tournament was the US Open, where he defeated Albert Montañés and David Nalbandian, before losing to Tomáš Berdych in five sets. He responded to his US Open loss by reaching the final of the China Open in Beijing, defeating three top 20 players; Rainer Schüttler, Dominik Hrbatý and Paradorn Srichaphan. Marat Safin, a fellow Russian, defeated Youzhny in the final. Youzhny's next two events were the Grand Prix de Tennis de Lyon and the Kremlin Cup, where he reached the quarterfinals, losing to Xavier Malisse, and the semifinals, losing to Nikolay Davydenko, respectively. In October at the St. Petersburg Open, Youzhny won his first title since 2002, defeating world No. 53 Karol Beck in two sets. Youzhny ended the year by reaching the quarterfinals of the BNP Paribas Masters in Paris. He had earlier upset eighth ranked Tim Henman but lost in the quarterfinals to Radek Štěpánek. Youzhny's season tally was a 42–27 win–loss record, and he had a year-end ranking of sixteen.

The 2005 season started with a first round loss to Rafael Nadal at Qatar ExxonMobil Open. At the Australian Open, Youzhny was seeded 15th but lost in a five-setter in the second round to Nadal. Nadal saved a match point in the fourth set. At the Dubai Tennis Championships, Youzhny reached the quarterfinals and lost to world No. 1 Roger Federer. Youzhny lost in either the first or second round in six tournaments in a row, including the French Open, where he lost to Jürgen Melzer in three sets. At Wimbledon, Youzhny, reached the fourth round for the first time since 2002, losing to Fernando González in three sets. In July, at both the Swedish Open and the Generali Open, Youzhny reached the quarterfinals, losing to Tommy Robredo and Gastón Gaudio respectively. At the Western & Southern Financial Group Masters in Cincinnati, Youzhny reached his only ATP Masters 1000 quarterfinals of the season, but lost to 5th ranked Andy Roddick in three sets. After wins against Florian Mayer and Jonas Björkman at the 2005 US Open Youzhny lost in round three to Xavier Malisse, after leading 2–0 in sets. After a third round loss to Guillermo Coria at the China Open, Youzhny reached the quarterfinals of the Kremlin Cup where he was upset by wild card entry Dmitry Tursunov. In his last tournament of the season, Youzhny lost his title at the St. Petersburg Open, losing to Robin Vik in the quarterfinals. Youzhny ended the season with a 23–23 win–loss record, making it one of his worst seasons in his career, and ended the year as world No. 43.

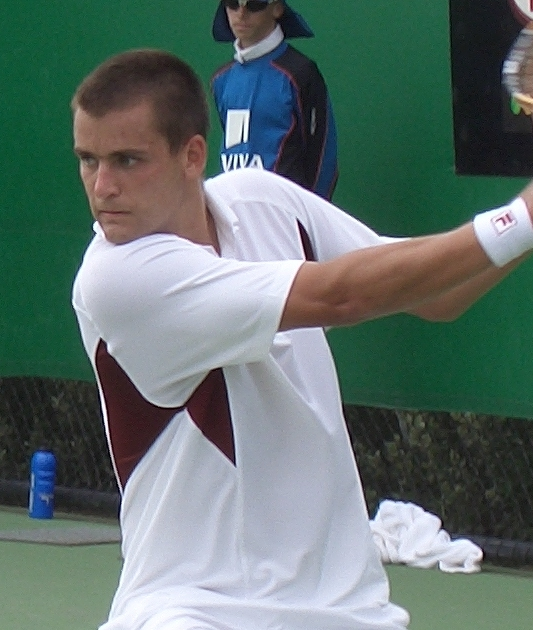
Youzhny during one of his matches at the 2006 Australian Open

January 2006 started with victories against Jonas Björkman and Davide Sanguinetti, but a quarterfinal loss to Tommy Haas at the Qatar Open This was followed by a first round defeat by Xavier Malisse at the Australian Open. However, Youzhny steadily improved by reaching the quarterfinals of the PBS Zabreb Indoors and then the semifinals of the Dubai Tennis Championships, defeating players such as Dominik Hrbatý and Igor Andreev on the way. He lost to world No. 1 Roger Federer. At the French Open Youzhny lost to Carlos Moyá in three sets. Youzhny reached the third round at Wimbledon but lost to Novak Djokovic in four sets. In July at the Austrian Open, Youzhny reached his second semifinal of the season, losing to Juan Ignacio Chela. Youzhny went into the 2006 US Open ranked number fifty-four. He defeated Dominik Hrbatý, Nicolás Massú, David Ferrer and Tommy Robredo before upsetting 2nd-seed Rafael Nadal in four sets in the quarterfinals. He lost to Andy Roddick in the semifinals. This marked the first time in four attempts that Youzhny was able to come through the fourth round of a Major. Later that year, on 25 October, Youzhny tore the ligaments in his right ankle and did not play for the rest of the season. Youzhny ended the season with a 25–21 win–loss record, and with a year-end ranking of twenty-four.

The 2007 season started with Youzhny reaching the quarterfinals at the Qatar Open, losing in three tight sets to Ivan Ljubičić. In his next tournament, Youzhny reached the third round of the Australian Open, losing to eventual champion and world No. 1 Roger Federer in three sets. He then reached the semifinals of the PBZ Zagreb Indoors and the quarterfinals of the Open 13 before winning his first title of the season, and his first ATP 500 title in his career, at the Rotterdam Open. Youzhny defeated Tomáš Berdych, Robin Haase, David Ferrer and Novak Djokovic, before taking out Ivan Ljubičić in the final. At the Dubai Tennis Championships he defeated Rafael Nadal in the quarterfinals in straight sets but lost to Roger Federer in the finals. His good form continued a few weeks later at the BMW Open where again he reached the final, losing to Philipp Kohlschreiber. At the French Open, Youzhny reached the fourth round for the first time in his career, being defeated by Roger Federer in three sets. At Wimbledon, and now ranked 13th in the world, he reached the fourth round for the second time in a row, with wins over Gilles Simon and Jarkko Nieminen. Despite holding a two-set lead, Youzhny eventually lost to Rafael Nadal. Nadal gained the momentum after Youzhny sought a medical timeout for a recurring back injury, the same injury which forced him retire from his quarterfinals match at that year's Gerry Weber Open. He then reached the semis of the Dutch Open and the third round of the Cincinnati Masters. Youzhny was now ranked No. 10 in the world. At the US Open Youzhny suffered a disappointing second round loss to Philipp Kohlschreiber. Losing in the second rounds in his next two tournaments, Youzhny reached the semifinals of the St. Petersburg Open, but lost to Andy Murray. He reached the quarterfinals of the Paris Masters with wins over Arnaud Clément, Fernando González and Tommy Haas, but lost in straight sets to Rafael Nadal. Youzhny ended the season with a 50–24 win–loss record, a 4–9 win–loss record versus top 10 players, earned a then career high of $1,028,900 in prize money, and finished ranked 19 in the world.

=== Becoming a top 10 player: 2008–2010 ===
Youzhny started the 2008 season by defeating world number two Rafael Nadal in under an hour at the final of the Chennai Open in India. However, the scoreline did not reflect the circumstances, Nadal's semi-final finished mere hours beforehand and he had little rest. Youzhny admitted as much, and said; "This victory is a present from Rafael", but Nadal responded by saying "I was a bit tired, but I must admit Mikhail played unbelievable tennis and deserved to win. There is nothing wrong with me." As the 14th-seed at the Australian Open Youzhny reached his first quarterfinals there by defeating world number four Nikolay Davydenko in straight sets. However, in the quarterfinals he lost to unseeded Frenchman Jo-Wilfried Tsonga, ranked world number thirty-eight and the eventual runner-up, in three sets. At the Open 13 in Marseille, France, Youzhny reached the quarterfinals, losing in straight sets to world number seventeen Marcos Baghdatis.

At the Miami Masters, Youzhny was 4–5 down with Spain's Nicolás Almagro serving in the final set, he hit a relatively easy return into the net. He gestured angrily towards his own temple, and then hit his head strongly with the edge of frame of his tennis racket three times, drawing blood. Despite this—and after receiving medical attention—he won the next seven points, taking the tiebreaker and also the match. In his next match, he lost to Serbia's Janko Tipsarević. His poor form continued into the clay season, but Youzhny, as the 15th-seed, managed to reach the third round of the French Open, losing to world number twenty-three Fernando Verdasco from Spain in four sets. At Wimbledon Youzhny was seeded 17th, and reached the fourth round by defeating 16th-seed Radek Štěpánek in a five-setter in the third round. He lost to 2nd-seed and eventual champion Rafael Nadal in the fourth round. At his next tournament, the Allianz Suisse Open Gstaad in Switzerland, Youzhny reached his last quarterfinals of the season and lost to Spain's Guillermo García López. At the Summer Olympics in Beijing, China, Youzhny lost in the third round to world number three Novak Djokovic. Youzhny withdrew from the US Open due to viral illness, making his first withdrawal from a grand slam after appearing in 23 in a row. Youzhny continued his poor results, reaching the first and second round in all the remaining tournaments, with one exception in Tokyo, Japan. He ended the year with a 28–22 win–loss record, and with an end of year ranking of 33.

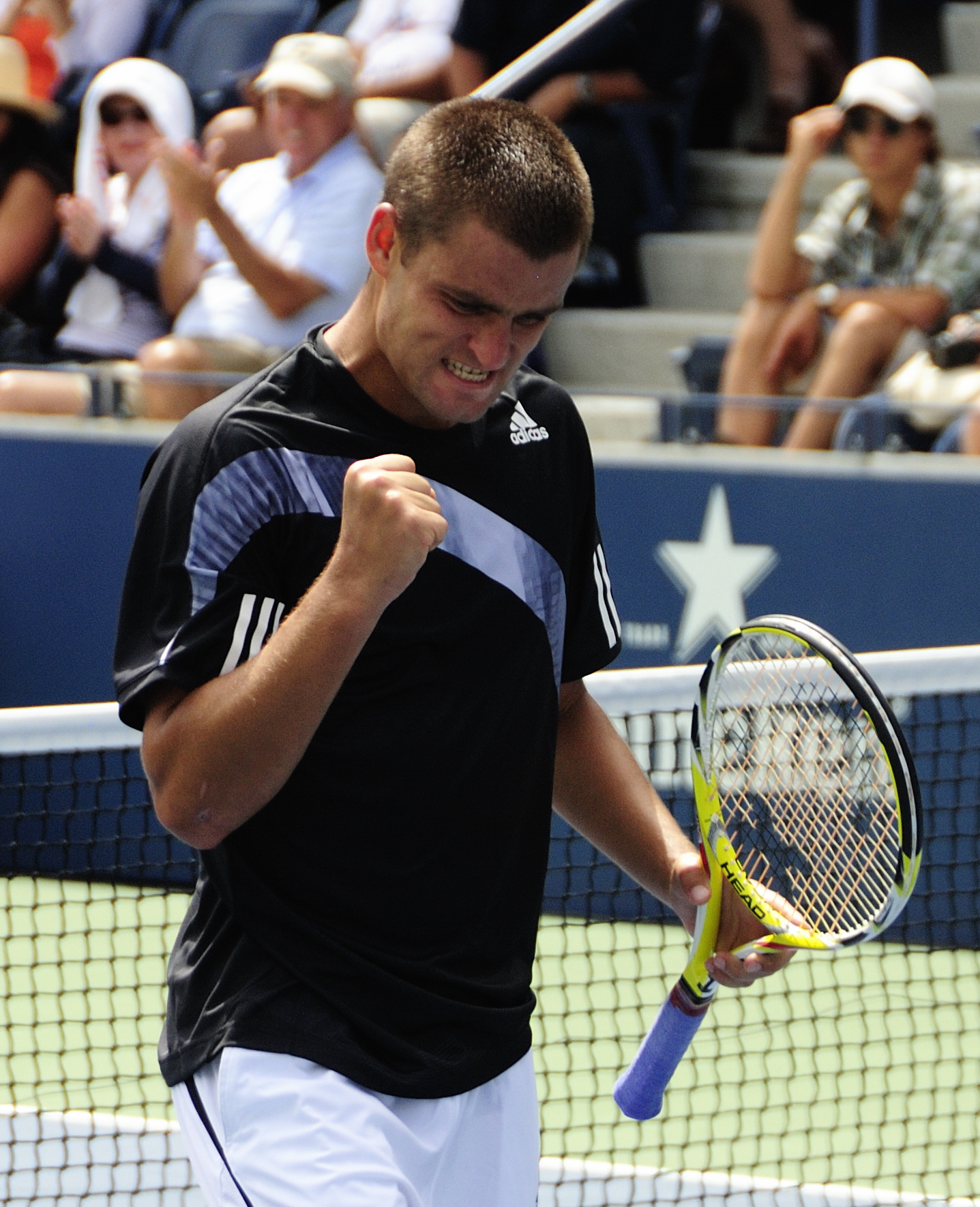
Youzhny in his first round match against Paul-Henri Mathieu at the 2009 US Open. He would go on to win the match in four sets.

The 2009 season started badly for Youzhny, and he lost in the first round of the Australian Open to world number 183 Stefan Koubek from Austria in straight sets. He reached back-to-back quarterfinals at ABN AMRO World Tennis Tournament in Rotterdam and the Open 13 in Marseille, defeating David Ferrer and Tomáš Berdych on his way. However, in his next seven tournaments, Youzhny lost either in qualifying, the first round or the second round. Youzhny entered the BMW Open in Munich ranked world number sixty-four, reached the final and lost to world number twenty-eight Tomáš Berdych in three tight sets. Youzhny continued his good form by reaching the semifinals of the Interwetten Austrian Open Kitzbühel in Austria, and lost to world number seventy-four and eventual champion Guillermo García López in three sets. At the French Open lost in the second round to 30th-seed Victor Hănescu. At his next tournament, the Aegon Championships in Queens, Great Britain, Youzhny reached the quarterfinals, defeating world number seven Gilles Simon from France on the way. He lost to world number sixteen James Blake in straight sets. At Wimbledon Youzhny failed to defend his ranking points earned the previous year, and lost in the first round to Spain Juan Carlos Ferrero. From his Wimbledon defeat towards the US Open, Youzhny lost in the first or second round six times in a row, with the sole exception coming at the Rogers Masters in Toronto, Canada. At the US Open Youzhny reached the second round, losing to qualifier Marco Chiudinelli from Switzerland in four sets. However, Youzhny immediately bounced back by reaching the quarterfinals of the Proton Malaysian Open in Kuala Lumpur, where he lost to world number twelve Fernando González. He made the finals at the Rakuten Japan Open Tennis Championships in Tokyo, after beating Lleyton Hewitt for the first time in a grueling three set win. In the final, he faced but lost to world number seven Jo-Wilfried Tsonga. He then clinched his first title of 2009 at the Kremlin Cup in Moscow where he defeated world number forty-six Janko Tipsarević. At Valencia Open Youzhny reached the final by defeating two top 10 players, Jo-Wilfried Tsonga and Nikolay Davydenko. He lost to Andy Murray in the final. After his performance in Valencia, Youzhny became world number nineteen. Youzhny ended the season with a 42–28 win–loss record, had a 4–3 win–loss record against top 10 players, and with an end-year ranking of 19.

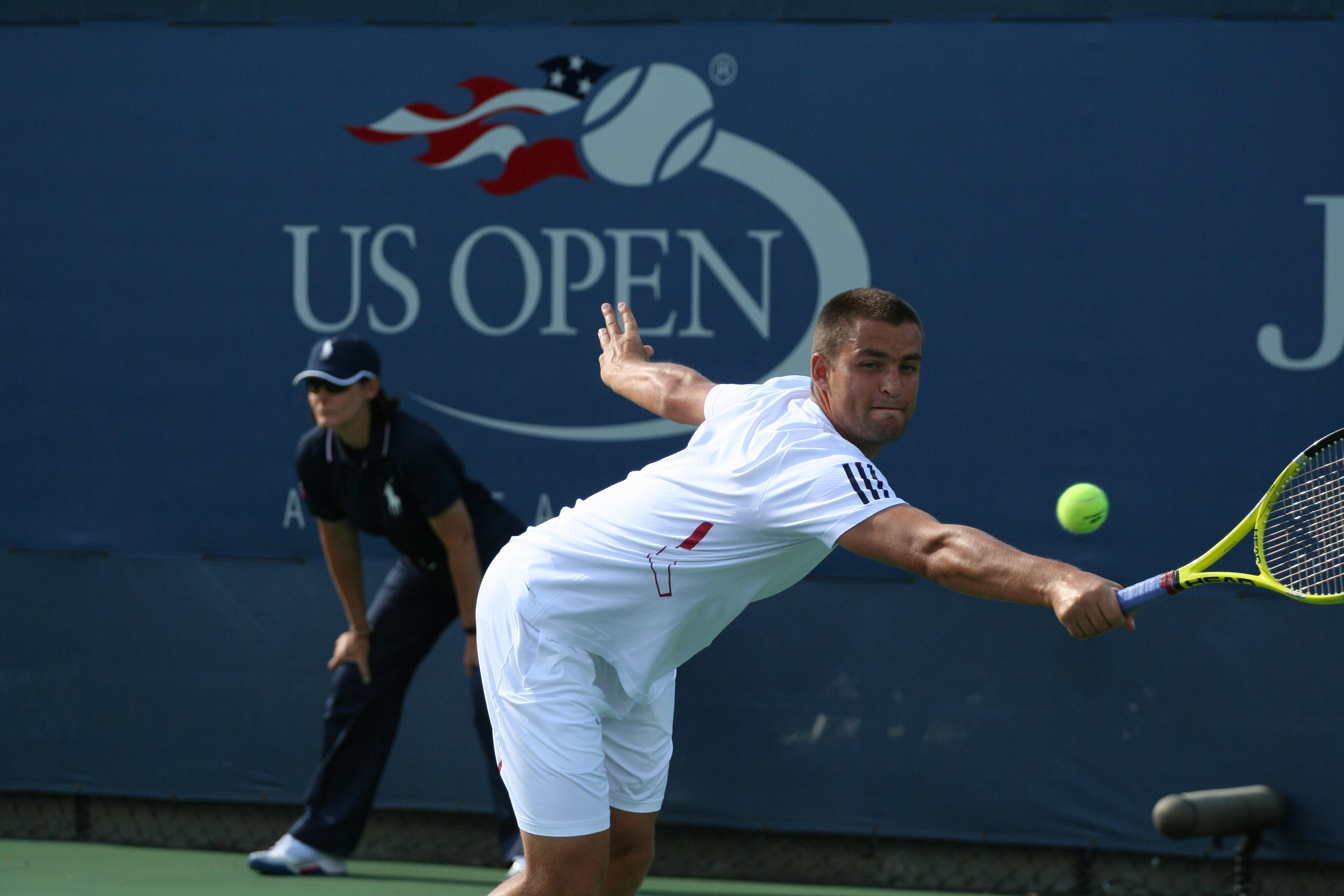
Youzhny in his third round match against John Isner at the 2010 US Open. He would go on to win the match in three sets

Youzhny started the 2010 season by pulling out of the third round of the Australian Open with a wrist injury. In the first round, he beat Richard Gasquet after being down 2 sets to 0. He beat Jan Hájek in the second round. After the recovery, he made the final at the ABN AMRO World Tennis Tournament in Rotterdam, worth 500 ATP points. Notably, he stunned top-seeded Novak Djokovic in two tiebreaks in the semifinal. In the final, he trailed behind world number eight Robin Söderling 4–6, 0–2 before retiring, due to a right hamstring injury. In his next tournament, he reached his second successive final at the Dubai Tennis Championships. En route to the final, he beat Lukáš Lacko, Björn Phau, Janko Tipsarević, and Jürgen Melzer. In the final, he lost to world number two seed Novak Djokovic (the defending champion). It was Youzhny's fourth consecutive final loss in an ATP 500 event. He reached the quarterfinals of the Sony Ericsson Open in Miami, losing to world number seven Robin Söderling. On his third final appearance, Youzhny defeated world number eleven Marin Čilić to win his first BMW Open in Munich, Germany. Youzhny entered the French Open as the 11th-seed, and reached the quarterfinals for the first time by defeating world number ten Jo-Wilfried Tsonga when Tsonga retired in the second set. Youzhny lost to Tomáš Berdych, the 15th-seed. Seeded 13th, Youzhny lost a tough five-setter to resurgent Paul-Henri Mathieu in the second round of Wimbledon. At the Allianz Suisse Open Gstaad in Switzerland, Youzhny lost to world number 147 Yuri Schukin from Kazakhstan. Youzhny, seeded 14th, reached the semifinals of the US Open for the first time since 2010, but lost to world number one Rafael Nadal. Because of his performance at the US Open, Youzhny reentered the top 10 for the first time since 2008. Youzhny, in his first tournament since the US Open, won his second title of the year by defeating world number forty-one Andrey Golubev at the Proton Malaysian Open. Following his victory, Youzhny reached a career-high ranking of world number eight. He was forced to withdraw from the Kremlin Cup, in which he was the defending champion, due to a viral illness. At his next tournament, the St. Petersburg Open, Youzhny reached the final, but lost to world number eighty-eight Mikhail Kukushkin from Kazakhstan. Youzhny's season ended when he was forced to retire with a back injury against world number twenty-six Ernests Gulbis at the BNP Paribas Masters in Paris. By retiring, Youzhny lost his last chance to qualify for the Barclays ATP World Tour Finals. For the first time in his career, Youzhny finished the year as world number ten and as the highest-ranked player from Russia. He ended the year with a 43–19 win–loss record, 2–4 against top ten opponents and earning a career high of $1,900,349 in prize money.

=== Keep in form: 2011–2013 ===
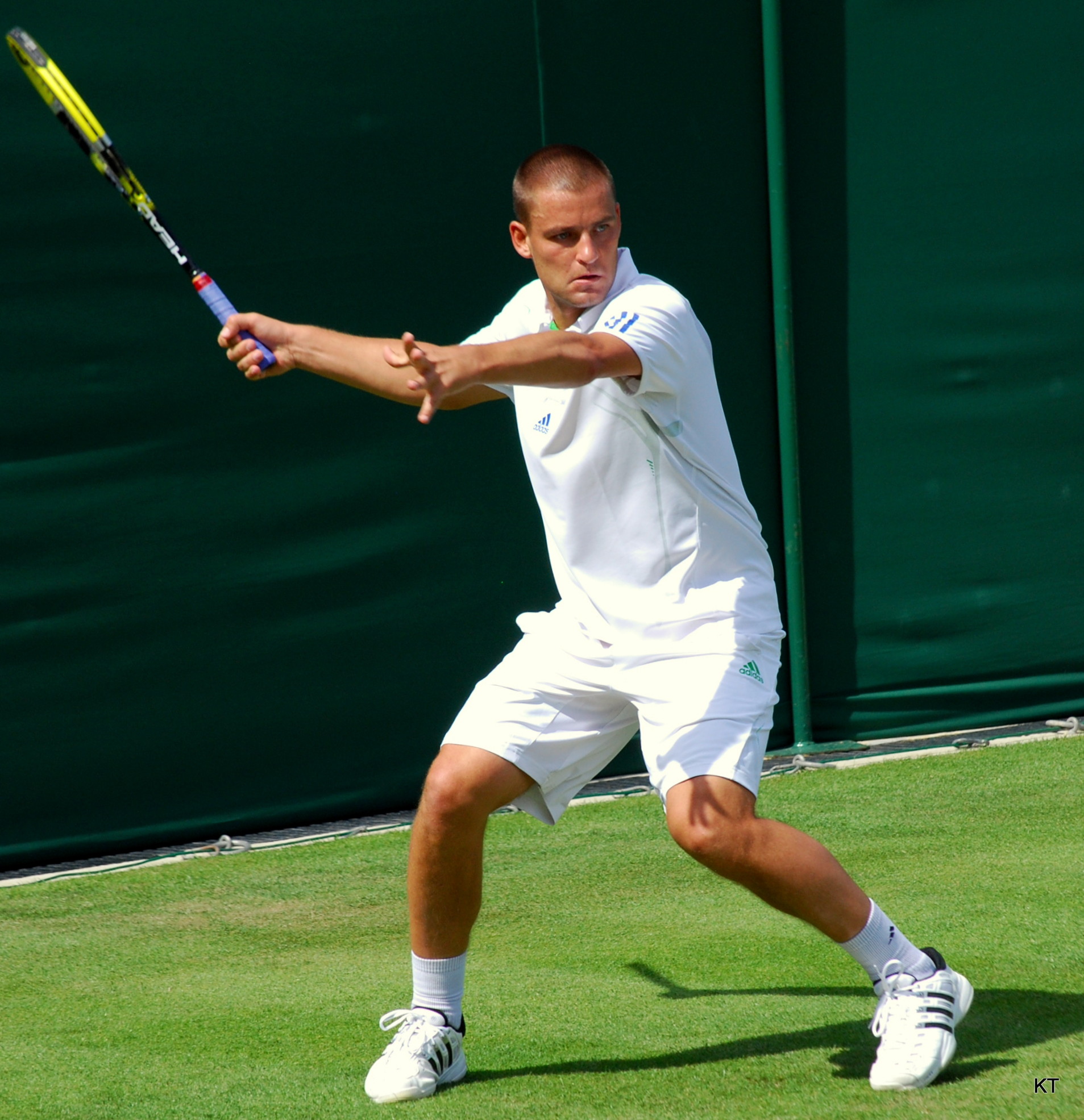
Youzhny during his first round match at 2011 Wimbledon against Argentine Juan Mónaco. He would win the match in five sets.

Youzhny began the 2011 season at the Australian Open where he reached the third round, losing to Canadian qualifier Milos Raonic in four sets. He made his next appearance at the 2011 ABN AMRO World Tennis Tournament in Rotterdam, but failed in protecting his points from the previous year, and lost to world number four Robin Söderling. He responded to his early loss with a semifinal showing at the Open 13 in Marseille, France, and lost to world number twenty-eight Marin Čilić. At the Dubai Tennis Championships he again failed to defend his ranking points, and recorded his first loss to Gilles Simon. In doubles, he and Sergiy Stakhovsky went on to defeat Feliciano López and Jérémy Chardy in the final to win their second title as a team and Youzhny's eighth career doubles title. From his defeat by Simon in Dubai to the French Open, with the exception of one third round defeat, he lost either in the first or second round. Youzhny was seeded 12th at the French Open, and lost in the third round to world number thirty-eight Albert Montañés, a Spanish clay-court specialist, in straight sets. At Wimbledon Youzhny, seeded 18th, reached the fourth round where he was defeated by world number three Roger Federer in four sets. Between Wimbledon and the US Open, Youzhny reached two semifinals. At the first, at the International German Open in Hamburg, he lost to Gilles Simon, and at the second, the Crédit Agricole Suisse Open Gstaad in Switzerland, he lost to world number forty-five Marcel Granollers. Youzhny was seeded 16th at the US Open, but lost in the first round to world number fifty-three Ernests Gulbis in the first round. His early upset at the US Open saw him slip from world number fifteen to world number thirty-two. Despite being the defending champion of the Proton Malaysian Open Youzhny decided not to participate. His first post-US Open tournament was the China Open in Beijing, where he reached the quarterfinals, but lost to world number twenty-six Ivan Ljubičić. He reached his last semifinal of the season at the St. Petersburg Open, losing to world number twenty-two Marin Čilić, the eventual champion. Youzhny ended the season with a 27–23 win–loss record, and with an end-of-year rank of 35 in the world.

The 2012 season began at the Qatar Open in Doha, where he reached the quarterfinals before falling to world number two Rafael Nadal. From there, it was on to the Australian Open, where he fell to qualifier Andrey Golubev in the first round. At his next tournament, the PBZ Zagreb Indoors in Croatia, Youzhny defeated Lukáš Lacko, the world number ninety-six, in the singles final and claimed the eighth singles title of his career. He also won the doubles title with Marcos Baghdatis, defeating Jonathan Erlich/Andy Ram in the semifinal and Mate Pavić/Ivan Dodig in the final. This is his 9th doubles title and the last title so far. He reached the quarterfinals at the Dubai Tennis Championships in February, but lost in to Roger Federer. In his last quarterfinals appearance before the French Open, he was defeated by Marin Čilić at the BMW Open in Munich. Youzhny was seeded 27th at the French Open, and lost in the third round to world number six David Ferrer. The match is notable for Youzhny apologizing to the crowd about his performance by writing "SORRI" in the clay. His grass season began with a semifinals showing at the Gerry Weber Open in Halle, losing to Roger Federer. At Wimbledon, Youzhny, seeded 26th, won his fourth round match for the first time on seven attempts to reach the quarterfinals. On his way to the quarterfinals he defeated world number nine Janko Tipsarević, and he required five sets to beat world number thirty-nine Denis Istomin in his fourth round. He lost to Roger Federer, the eventual champion. After this tournament, Youzhny became the third Russian male player to enter the quarterfinals of all four major events. Youzhny represented Russia at the Summer Olympics, the last grass court tournament of the year. In men's singles event, he lost in the first round to world number thirty-two Julien Benneteau. In the men's doubles event, Youzhny teamed with Nikolay Davydenko. They beat Christopher Kas and Philipp Petzschner from Germany in the first round, but lost to the eventual champion, the Bryan brothers from the United States of America, in the second round. Youzhny also participated in the mixed doubles event, partnering Elena Vesnina, and lost in the first round against Gisela Dulko and Juan Martín del Potro from Argentina. At the US Open Youzhny was seeded 28th, but lost in the first round to world number fifty-three Gilles Müller. In his next tournament, the St. Petersburg Open, Youzhny reached the semifinals, but lost to the eventual champion, world number forty-five Martin Kližan. At his next tournament, the China Open in Beijing, Youzhny reached the quarterfinals, but lost to world number seven Jo-Wilfried Tsonga. In the indoor season, Youzhny reached the quarterfinals both at the If Stockholm Open where he lost to world number six Tomáš Berdych and at the Swiss Indoors in Basel, where he lost to world number thirteen Richard Gasquet. Youzhny ended 2012 with a 33–21 win–loss record, and with an end year ranking of 25.

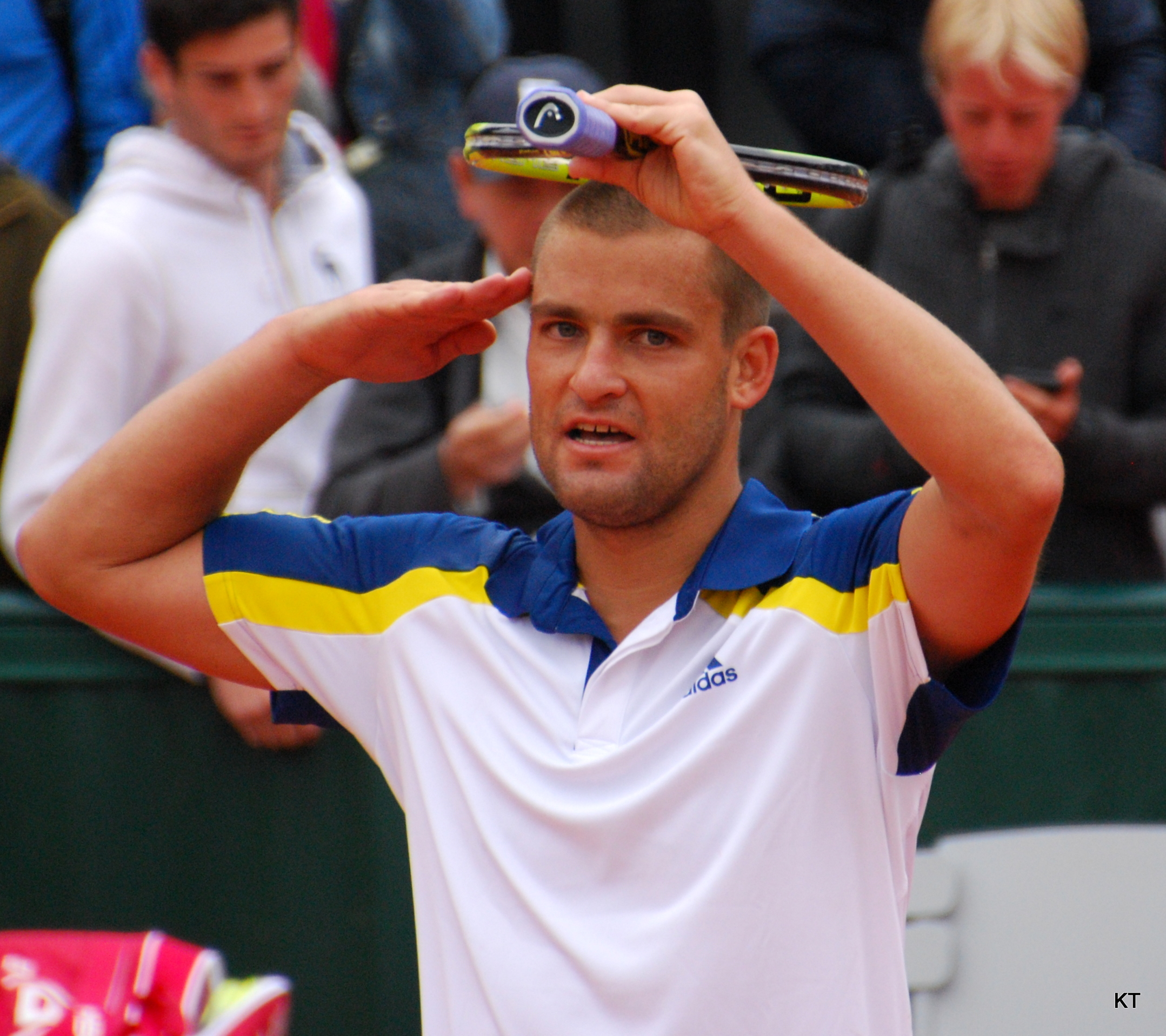
Youzhny after winning his second round match against world number 125 Federico Delbonis at the 2013 French Open

The 2013 season started with a poor showing for Youzhy at the Qatar Open, where he lost in the second round to world number forty-four Nikolay Davydenko. At the Australian Open he battled past his first round opponent world number 108 Matthew Ebden in a five-set thriller. He lost in the second round to world number eighty-two Evgeny Donskoy, a Russian newcomer to the top 100, in another five-setter. In his first post Australian Open tournament, Youzhny failed in his bid to defend his title at the PBZ Zagreb Indoors, losing to world number twelve Marin Čilić at semifinal. Later on in the season, at the French Open, in which he was the 29th-seed, Youzhny reached the fourth round. In the third round Youzhny defeated 8th-seed Janko Tipsarević. He was defeated in the fourth round by 12th-seed Tommy Haas, during which he infamously smashed his racquet with the bench. Youzhny continued his good form into the Gerry Weber Open by reaching his first grass-court final in his career. On his way to the final Youzhny defeated top 20 player Philipp Kohlschreiber in the quarterfinals, top 15 player Kei Nishikori in the second round and top 10 player Richard Gasquet in the semifinals. He lost in three sets in the final to world number three Roger Federer. At Wimbledon, where he was the 20th-seed, Youzhny lost in the fourth round to world number two and eventual champion Andy Murray. Not long after, Youzhny won his first title of the year at the Swiss Open in Gstaad, defeating Robin Haase in the final. Youzhny had a strong showing at the U.S Open, reaching his sixth major quarterfinal, eventually losing to Novak Djokovic in four sets. On his way Youzhny defeated Alexandr Dolgopolov in straight sets in the round of 64 and Tommy Haas in four sets in the round of 32. In his round of 16 match against Lleyton Hewitt, Youzhny trailed in the fourth set and in the fifth set, but fought back on both occasions to win the match in a five set thriller. Later, Youzhny reached the quarterfinal at Bangkok and lost to Richard Gasquet in three sets. At Valencia Open 500, unseeded Youzhny claimed the 10th singles title and the 2nd title of ATP 500 events of his career. This is also the 2nd singles title of the year. In the final, he defeated the top seed David Ferrer in straight set. Youzhny finished his 2013 season with a retirement against Kevin Anderson in the first round at the BNP Paribas Masters. He ended with a 39–24 winning record and with a year end ranking of 15.

=== Later career: 2014–2017 ===
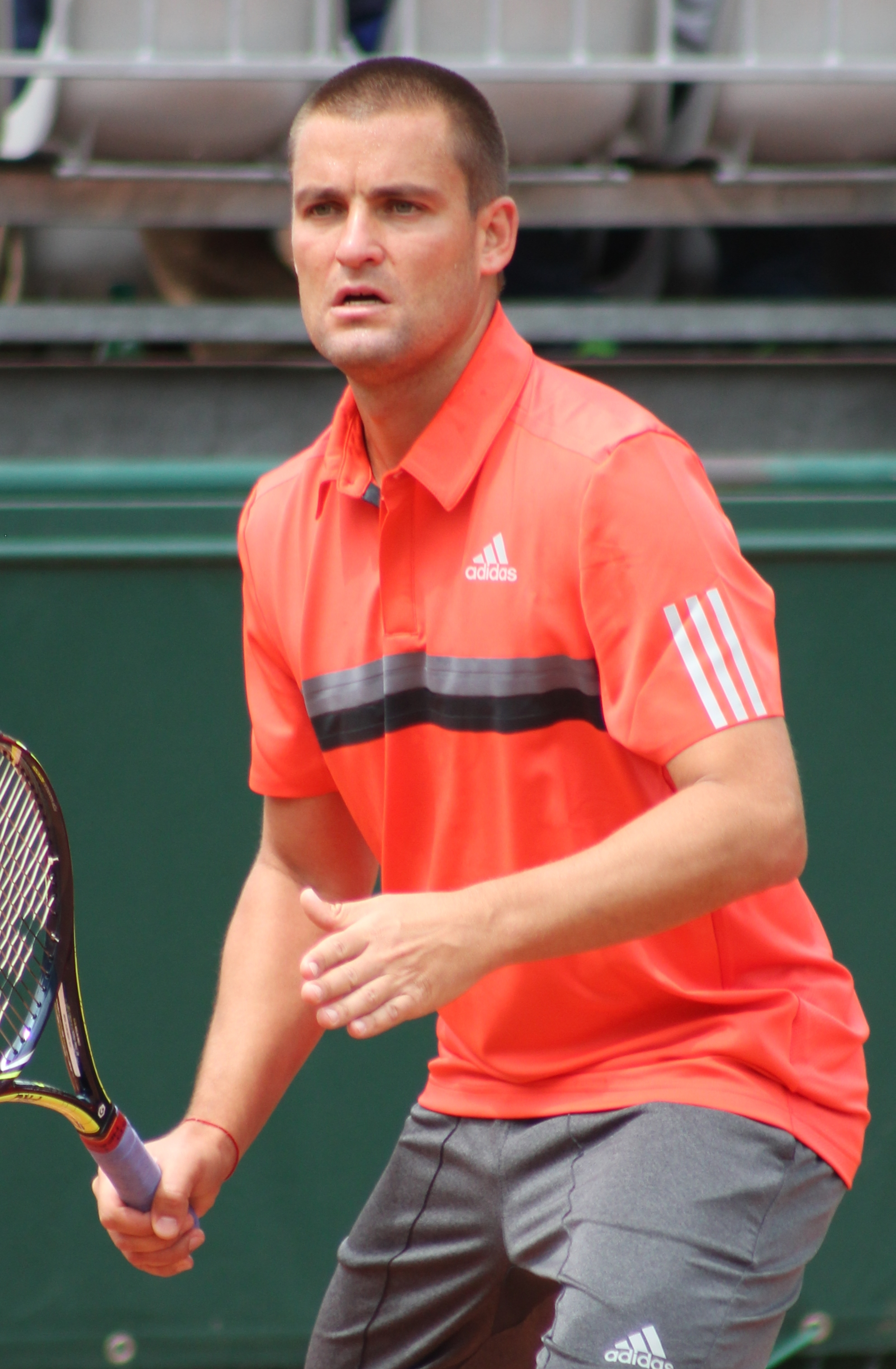
Youzhny at the 2015 French Open.

Youzhny began his 2014 season at the Australian Open where he reached the second round before losing to Florian Mayer. At the French Open, Youzhny again made the second round, but lost to Radek Štěpánek. At Wimbledon, he reached the second round of a major for the third time, only to lose to qualifier Jimmy Wang. At the US Open, Youzhny was upset in the first round to world No. 60, Nick Kyrgios in four sets.

Mikhail signs to Hyderabad Aces to play first season of Champions Tennis League India.

Youzhny's 2015 season saw a number of first round loses. His best result was entering the quarterfinals of the Zagreb Indoors, losing there to Marcos Baghdatis. On 3 August, he left the top 100 ranking for the first time since 2001. On 8 November, he won his first ATP challenger event champion since 2000, Bauer Watertechnology Cup at Eckental, Germany, defeating 4th seed Benjamin Becker straight sets in the final. He finished the year with a year-end ranking of 127, which is the worst since 2000.

Youzhny began his 2016 season strong in the challenger events in Southeast Asia, where he claimed three titles in three consecutive weeks in Thailand and the Philippines. In the final of KPN Bangkok Open, Youzhny, as the third seed, defeated fifth seed Go Soeda of Japan. In the KNP Bangkok Open II, he won the title without losing a set. In the Manila Challenger, Youzhny, as the second seed, thrilled through the semifinal by defeating Lukáš Lacko, and claimed the title by defeating Marco Chiudinelli in straight sets. By winning these titles, Youzhny raised his ranking back into top 100. At the US Open, Youzhny beat 28th seed Martin Kližan to reach the second round where he faced Guido Pella. Youzhny continued his impressive form, dispatching Pella to advance to the third round where he faced No. 1 Novak Djokovic. Youzhny was forced to retire in the first set due to an injury. At the St. Petersburg Open, Youzhny defeated Milos Raonic, dispatching yet another top 30 player as he returned to the ATP Top 50. He competed in the 2016 Shanghai Rolex Masters as a qualifier, but lost to Nicolás Almagro from Spain in the first round after winning the first set. Youzhny finished his 2016 season with a five-match losing streak, with four more matches lost at Antwerp, Basel, Paris Masters Qualifying and the Challenger event at Mouilleron-le-Captif. Youzhny had a year-end singles ranking of 57 for 2016.

Youzhny started his 2017 season at the 2017 Aircel Chennai Open, where he reached the quarterfinals by beating Indian Saketh Myneni and Argentine Renzo Olivo without losing a set. However, although having a strong beginning set, he was overturned by Spaniard Roberto Bautista Agut by 6–2, 4–6, 4–6. In Australian Open, he retired to Marcos Baghdatis from Cyprus in the opening round. Then, he suffered from a number of first or second round losses. At Halle, he defeated Yūichi Sugita from Japan by 7–6^{(7–5)}, 6–7^{(11–13)}, 7–6^{(14–12)}, in the qualifying round. The match, which lasted for 3 hours and 35 minutes, recorded the longest ATP match of the year at that time. He then defeated Croatian Ivo Karlović in the first round, but lost to the compatriot wild-card holder Andrey Rublev in three sets in the second round. At Wimbledon, he stunned Nicolas Mahut in straight sets the first round. This is Youzhny's 100th win at Grand Slam events. In the second round, despite winning the first set, he eventually lost to the sixth seed and 2016 runner-up Milos Raonic. Youzhny's ranking slipped to no. 98 after 5 first round exits in Austria, Croatia, and Switzerland, as well as 2 first round exits at the Coupe de Rogers in Montreal and the Western and Southern Open, in Cincinnati. He then competed at the US Open and fell to Roger Federer in the 2R after being up two sets to one.

=== Retirement in 2018 ===
At the 2018 Atlanta Open, Youzhny announced his retirement from professional tennis, with the 2018 St. Petersburg Open marking his final appearance. After beating Mirza Bašić in the first round for his 499th and final career win, Youzhny lost to Roberto Bautista Agut in three sets in the second round.

== Coaching ==
Youzhny was sighted working with Denis Shapovalov at the Winston-Salem Open in 2019 and it has been confirmed that he will be working with the young Canadian for the US Open Series. Youzhny has been an outspoken opposition to the Russian Tennis Federation since the 2010 Kremlin Cup.

== National representation ==
=== Davis Cup ===
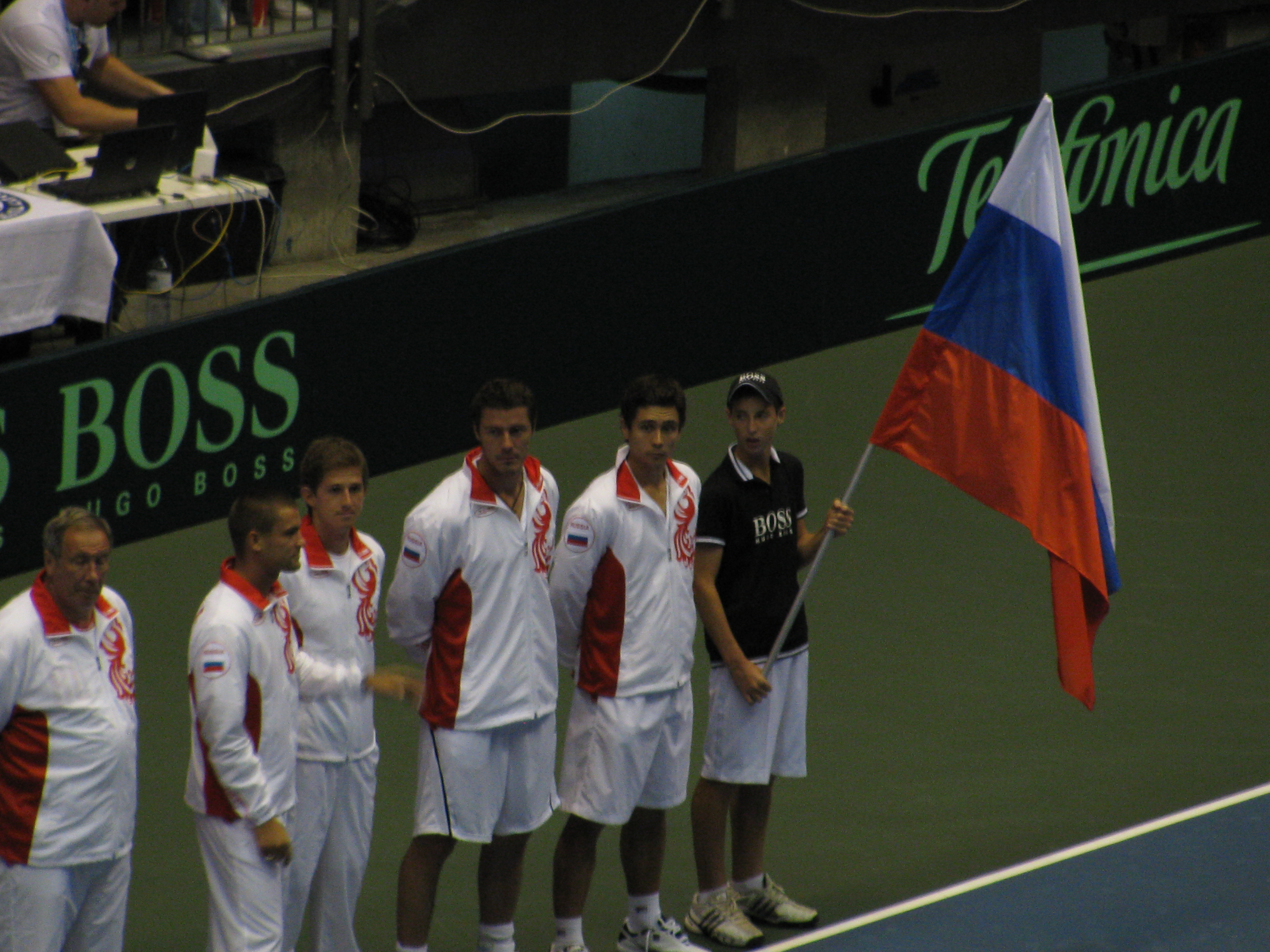
The Russian Davis Cup Team in 2009. From right to left: the team captain, Youzhny, Igor Andreev, Marat Safin and Igor Kunitsyn

Youzhny played his first Davis Cup match in the World Group first round against Belgium in a dead rubber. He defeated Olivier Rochus in the fourth match. Youzhny would go on to lose four matches in a row. At the 2002 World Group final, Youzhny played the deciding match against Paul-Henri Mathieu and came back from two sets down to win. In 2003, in Russia's first round match against Belarus, Youzhny played the fifth and decisive match and lost to Vladimir Voltchkov. In the 2006 World Group Youzhny participated in the first round, quarterfinals and in the semifinals, but did not play in the final against Argentina. However, he did participate in the 2007 final against the United States, but he lost in the second match to James Blake in four sets. The defeat gave the United States a 2–0 lead over Russia, with the United States winning the final 4–1. At the 2008 World Group Youzhny only participated in the first round against Serbia, winning his singles match against Nenad Zimonjić. In the third match he partnered with Dmitry Tursunov against Novak Djokovic and Nenad Zimonjić but lost. However, despite his doubles loss, Russia advanced and won 3–2.

Russia, which was world number one, was heavily favored in their match against Israel. The matches were hosted by Israel in the World Group quarterfinal tie in July 2009, on indoor hard courts at the Nokia Arena in Tel Aviv. Israel beat Russia in each of their first three matches, thereby winning the tie. world number 210 Harel Levy first beat world number twenty-four Igor Andreev, while world number thirty-three Dudi Sela followed by beating Youzhny in four sets. "This is a bit of a surprise", Youzhny said. He said he was very disappointed, and added: "I began very well, but after I took the first set, my luck fell away." The next day Israelis Andy Ram and Jonathan Erlich beat Safin and doubles specialist Igor Kunitsyn. Israel defeated Russia 4–1 for the win.

Youzhny resigned from the Russian Davis Cup team in February 2011, stating, "I think the time has come for me step aside and give younger players a chance". He added, "Now, I want to devote more time to my family and concentrate on individual tournaments". However, he competed at the 2011 Davis Cup tie with Brazil, stating that "We're in a tough situation right now and I thought it was my duty to help the team. Therefore, I've made myself available for that tie." Youzhny won both of his rubbers, the first against Ricardo Mello, while he took over five hours to defeat Thomaz Bellucci, 14–12 in the fifth set. In his last Davis Cup match so far, in 2012, Youzhny partnered with Nikolay Davydenko to beat Austria doubles team Oliver Marach and Alexander Peya.

=== Summer Olympics ===
Youzhny participated in three Summer Olympics; Athens 2004, Beijing 2008 and London 2012. In Athens he reached the quarterfinals and ended up losing to silver medalist Mardy Fish. He also played doubles in Athens, partnering up with Marat Safin, but ended up losing to Bob and Mike Bryan in the first round. In Beijing, Youzhny reached the third round, but lost to Novak Djokovic. In the doubles competition he and Dmitry Tursunov reached the second round, losing to eventual champions Roger Federer and Stanislas Wawrinka in two sets. In London, he lost in the first round to Julien Benneteau. At the doubles he was more successful; he and his partner Nikolay Davydenko reached the second round, losing in two tiebreaks to Bob and Mike Bryan. In the mixed doubles, however, he and teammate Elena Vesnina lost in the first round in straight sets to the Argentine team of Gisela Dulko and Juan Martín del Potro.

== Playing style, equipment and team ==
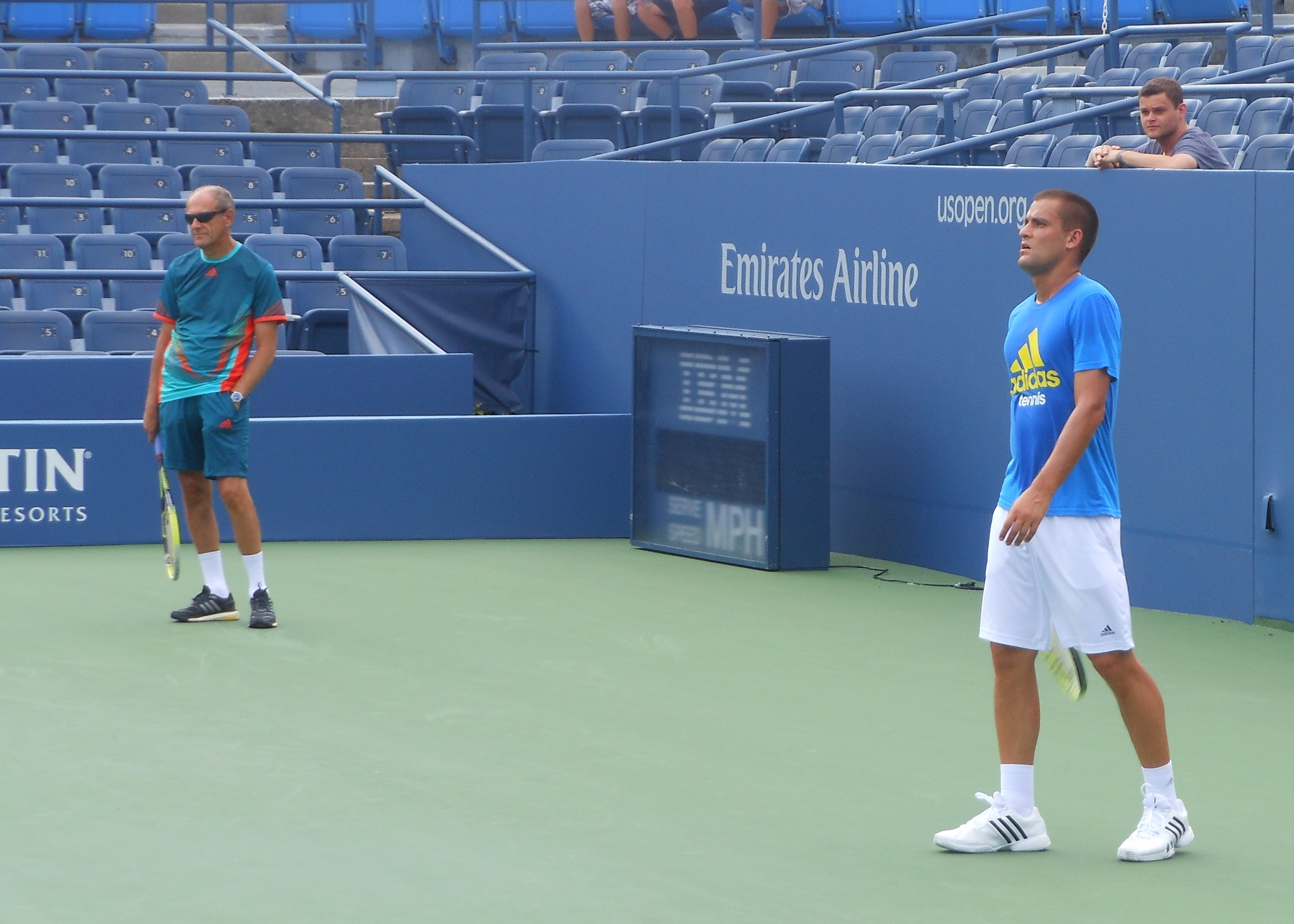
Mikhail Youzhny practicing with his longtime coach Boris Sobkin

Youzhny had powerful groundstrokes on both sides. Former professional tennis player and now coach Peter Lundgren stated that Youzhny's "backhand slice is one of the best in the world. His slice had a lot of variety and he can neutralise an opponent's offence quickly with it." However, while his backhand slice was a good defensive weapon, his main attacking weapon was his one-handed backhand hit with topspin. Youzhny used

a backhand grip around 3/4 of the way from Continental toward Modified Eastern. His grip is close enough to Modified Eastern to allow him to hit topspin with reasonable comfort, but most players would hit stronger topspin with a grip right on Modified Eastern or closer to Full Eastern. Youzhny's backhand grip would work well for slice, but he changes to an Eastern forehand grip for his slice.

When asked at the 2014 Dubai Tennis Championships about Youzhny, Novak Djokovic, then world no. 2, replied;

Mikhail [...] has one of the nicest and most efficient one handed backhands on the tour. It seems a little bit unorthodox the way he holds his racquet, then [he] releases with two hands and in the end with one hand. But he's a very talented player.

According to The New York Times columnist Christopher Clarley, Youzhny's one-handed backhand was one of the more unusual ones on tour, hit with a "free left arm accompanying his right arm as he swings through the ball." Veteran coach Sven Groeneveld jokingly said that Youzhny's should be called a "half one-hander". Youzhny hit the ball early on both sides, so as to "achieve a flatter flight trajectory and to get the ball to the opponent's side quicker." He was also noted for his good court sense and often used drop shots to mix up his game, and he was very talented at volleying.

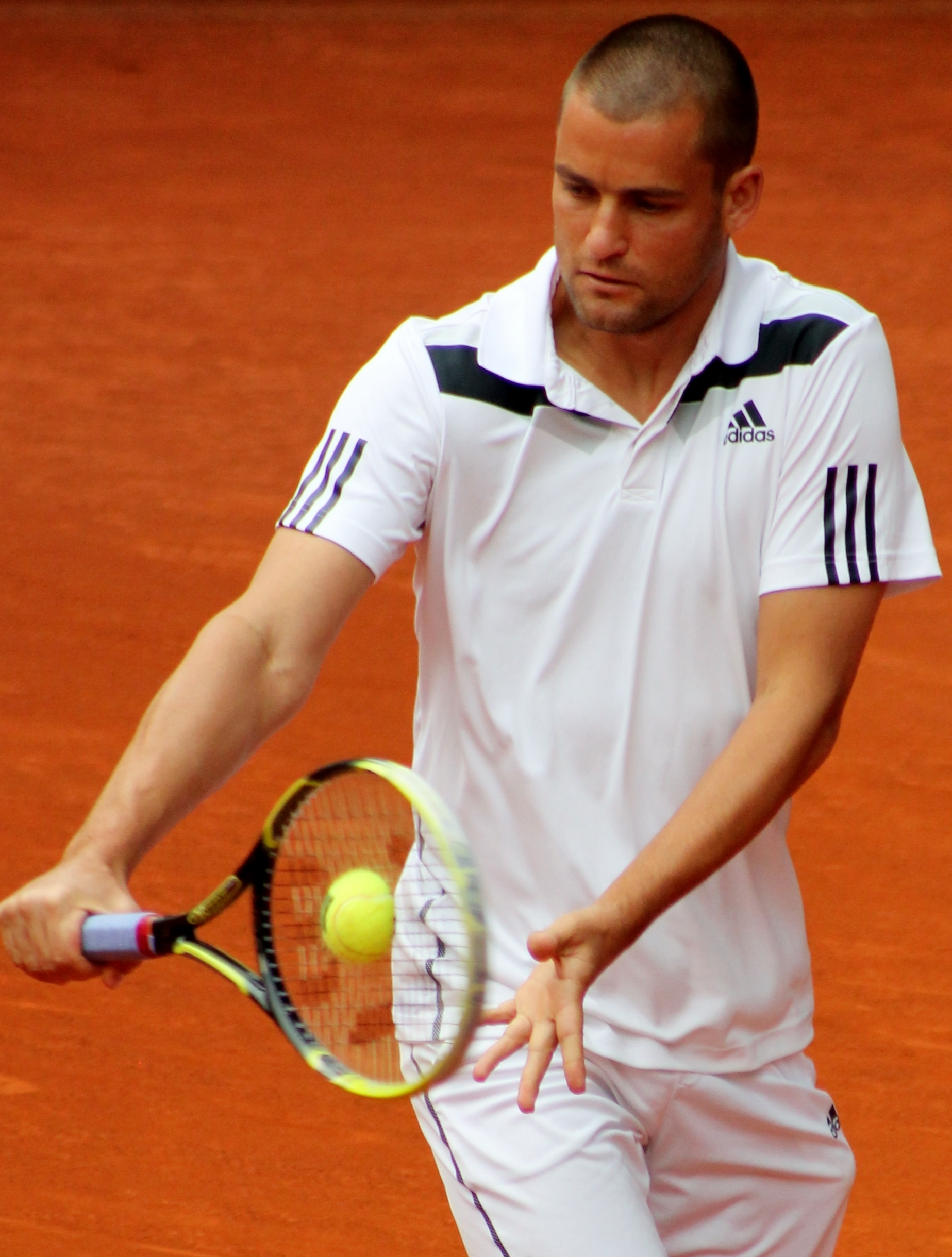
Youzhny hitting one of his one-handed backhands at the 2014 Mutua Madrid Open.

Youzhny was good on all surfaces, and was noted for his all-court game. Youzhny was noted for his ability to be able to change surfaces quickly without difficulty. However, his best surface is grass. He had 53 tour-level wins on grass. Kevin Mitchell from The Guardian referred to Youzhny as a grass-court specialist.

Former Russian top-10 player Alex Metreveli referred to Youzhny as a "really a great fighter", he said, "I cannot even remember how many matches he has won in tough situations. Russian people respect Mischa because he is a man who works hard. And his fighting spirit is just incredible. What he did in Paris for Davis Cup is just one of many such examples." He had an ability to change rapidly to all conditions. However, a consistent weakness throughout his career was his serve. Robert Davis, an employee of the Association of Tennis Professionals, once wrote that "Youzhny serves up less aces than a poor luck poker player". Former top-10 British tennis player Tim Henman said that Youzhny had a solid serve, at least on grass.

Youzhny was known on tour for his post-match military salute at the end of the match. Honoring his late father, Youzhny placed his racquet on his head while saluting the crowd instead of the hat that Russian military protocol dictates.

Boris Sobkin was Youzhny's coach since the age of 10 because of Youzhny's father's interference. His fitness trainer is Oleg Mosiakov. Youzhny wore adidas clothing and Barricade 7.0 shoes and used a Head Head Graphene XT Extreme Pro racquet.

== Personal life ==
The Russian government awarded Youzhny the title Honoured Master of Sports in 2003 for his participation in Russia's Davis Cup victory the previous year. Youzhny began studying for a degree in philosophy at the University of Moscow in 2005, specializing in the philosophy and attitudes of tennis. He obtained his PhD in December 2010. His thesis was entitled "Professional Tennis Players on the Court" and "was about other players and how they compared up against one another". When asked about his thesis, he said "I wrote it slowly when I had the time ... You find out about other players and try to compare them with you. You look at what you have to do against them or what changes they may make before their matches or during your match with them." Youzhny married Yulia on 22 November 2008 in Moscow; the couple had two sons and one daughter, Maxim born 2009, Igor born 2012 and Milana born 2019. Yulia died on 9 January 2024.

== Career statistics ==
=== Performance timelines ===
Key
W	F	SF	QF	#R	RR	Q#	DNQ	A	NH

(W) winner; (F) finalist; (SF) semifinalist; (QF) quarterfinalist; (#R) rounds 4, 3, 2, 1; (RR) round-robin stage; (Q#) qualification round; (DNQ) did not qualify; (A) absent; (NH) not held; (SR) strike rate (events won / competed); (W–L) win–loss record.

==== Singles ====
Tournament	2000	2001	2002	2003	2004	2005	2006	2007	2008	2009	2010	2011	2012	2013	2014	2015	2016	2017	2018	W–L	Win %
Grand Slam tournaments
Australian Open	A	3R	3R	4R	1R	2R	1R	3R	QF	1R	3R	3R	1R	2R	2R	1R	A	1R	1R	20–16	56%
French Open	Q1	1R	1R	2R	3R	2R	2R	4R	3R	2R	QF	3R	3R	4R	2R	1R	1R	1R	1R	23–18	56%
Wimbledon	A	4R	4R	2R	1R	4R	3R	4R	4R	1R	2R	4R	QF	4R	2R	1R	2R	2R	1R	32–18	64%
US Open	A	3R	A	1R	3R	3R	SF	2R	A	2R	SF	1R	1R	QF	1R	2R	3R	2R	1R	26–16	62%
Win–loss	0–0	7–4	5–3	5–4	4–4	7–4	8–4	9–4	9–3	2–4	12–3	7–4	6–4	11–4	3–4	1–4	2–3	2–4	0–4	101–68	60%
Year-end ranking	113	58	32	43	16	43	24	19	32	19	10	35	25	15	48	127	57	84	115		

Note: At the 2010 Australian Open, Youzhny withdrew prior to the third round

==== Doubles ====
Tournament	2002	2003	2004	2005	2006	2007	2008	2009	2010	2011	2012	2013	2014	2015	2016	2017	2018	W–L	Win %
Grand Slam tournaments
Australian Open	1R	1R	1R	1R	A	1R	1R	1R	1R	2R	1R	3R	QF	1R	A	1R	A	6–14	30%
French Open	A	A	1R	2R	3R	A	A	A	2R	2R	1R	A	1R	2R	1R	1R	A	6–11	35%
Wimbledon	A	A	1R	A	1R	A	A	A	A	A	A	A	1R	1R	1R	A	A	0–5	0%
US Open	A	1R	2R	3R	QF	A	A	A	3R	3R	2R	3R	1R	A	1R	1R	A	13–10	43%
Win–loss	0–1	0–2	1–4	3–3	5–3	0–1	0–1	0–1	3–3	4–3	1–3	4–2	3–4	1–3	0–3	0–3	0–0	25–40	38%
Year-end ranking	223	169	125	47	68	95	65	122	69	60	121	74	72	379	n/a	819	1025		
