= 2020 St. Petersburg Open =

- Date: October 12–18
- Edition: 25th
- Category: ATP Tour 500 Series
- Surface: Hard / indoors
- Location: St. Petersburg, Russia
- Venue: Sibur Arena

Champions

Singles
- (Russia) Andrey Rublev

Doubles
- (Austria) Jürgen Melzer / (France) Édouard Roger-Vasselin
← 2019 ·	St. Petersburg Open	· 2021 →

The 2020 St. Petersburg Open is a tennis tournament played on indoor hard courts that is part of the 2020 ATP Tour. It is the 25th edition of the St. Petersburg Open. The tournament was originally scheduled to take place from September 21 to 27, 2020, but was moved to October 12–18, and, since the ongoing COVID-19 pandemic caused many tournaments to be cancelled, upgraded to ATP 500 level for this one year. It is taking place at the Sibur Arena in Saint Petersburg, Russia.

== Singles main-draw entrants ==
=== Seeds ===
Country this year	Player	Rank^{1}	Seed
RUS	Daniil Medvedev	5	1
CAN	Denis Shapovalov	11	2
RUS	Andrey Rublev	12	3
RUS	Karen Khachanov	16	4
SUI	Stan Wawrinka	17	5
CAN	Milos Raonic	21	6
CRO	Borna Ćorić	27	7
USA	Taylor Fritz	30	8

- ^{1} Rankings are as of September 28, 2020

=== Other entrants ===
The following players received wildcards into the singles main draw:

- (Russia) Evgeny Donskoy
- (Russia) Aslan Karatsev
- (Russia) Roman Safiullin

The following player received entry using a protected ranking into the singles main draw:

- (United States) Mackenzie McDonald

The following players received entry from the qualifying draw:

- (Belarus) Ilya Ivashka
- (Russia) Pavel Kotov
- (Croatia) Nino Serdarušić
- (United States) J. J. Wolf

The following players received entry as a lucky loser:

- (Ecuador) Emilio Gómez
- (Serbia) Viktor Troicki

=== Withdrawals ===
Before the tournament

- (South Africa) Kevin Anderson → replaced by (Kazakhstan) Alexander Bublik
- (Italy) Matteo Berrettini → replaced by (Kazakhstan) Mikhail Kukushkin
- (Spain) Pablo Carreño Busta → replaced by (Spain) Feliciano López
- (Bulgaria) Grigor Dimitrov → replaced by (United Kingdom) Cameron Norrie
- (Belgium) David Goffin → replaced by (Ecuador) Emilio Gómez
- (Japan) Kei Nishikori → replaced by (Canada) Vasek Pospisil
- (United States) Sam Querrey → replaced by (Serbia) Viktor Troicki
- (Greece) Stefanos Tsitsipas → replaced by (Belarus) Egor Gerasimov

== Doubles main-draw entrants ==
=== Seeds ===
Country	Player	Country	Player	Rank^{1}	Seed
GBR	Jamie Murray	GBR	Neal Skupski	55	1
AUT	Jürgen Melzer	FRA	Édouard Roger-Vasselin	57	2
BEL	Sander Gillé	BEL	Joran Vliegen	77	3
AUS	Max Purcell	AUS	Luke Saville	78	4

- Rankings are as of September 20, 2020

=== Other entrants ===
The following pairs received wildcards into the doubles main draw:

- (Israel) Jonathan Erlich / (Belarus) Andrei Vasilevski
- (Russia) Daniil Golubev / (Russia) Evgenii Tiurnev

The following pair received entry from the qualifying draw:

- (Russia) Evgeny Donskoy / (Russia) Roman Safiullin

The following pair received entry as lucky losers:

- (Australia) James Duckworth / (Belarus) Ilya Ivashka

=== Withdrawals ===
Before the tournament

- (United States) Sam Querrey

During the tournament

- (Australia) James Duckworth

== Finals ==
=== Singles ===
- (Russia) Andrey Rublev def. (Croatia) Borna Ćorić, 7–6^{(7–5)}, 6–4

=== Doubles ===
- (Austria) Jürgen Melzer / (France) Édouard Roger-Vasselin def. (Brazil) Marcelo Demoliner / (Netherlands) Matwé Middelkoop, 6–2, 7–6^{(7–4)}
