= 2019 St. Petersburg Open =

Tennis tournament in Russia

- Date: September 16–22
- Edition: 24th
- Category: ATP Tour 250 series
- Surface: Hard / indoors
- Location: St. Petersburg, Russia
- Venue: Sibur Arena

Champions

Singles
- (Russia) Daniil Medvedev

Doubles
- (India) Divij Sharan / (Slovakia) Igor Zelenay
← 2018 ·	St. Petersburg Open	· 2020 →

The 2019 St. Petersburg Open was a tennis tournament played on indoor hard courts. It was the 24th edition of the St. Petersburg Open, and part of the ATP Tour 250 Series of the 2019 ATP Tour. It took place at the Sibur Arena in Saint Petersburg, Russia, from September 16 through 22, 2019.

== Singles main-draw entrants ==
=== Seeds ===
Country	Player	Rank^{1}	Seed
RUS	Daniil Medvedev	4	1
RUS	Karen Khachanov	9	2
ITA	Matteo Berrettini	13	3
CRO	Borna Ćorić	15	4
RUS	Andrey Rublev	37	5
KAZ	Mikhail Kukushkin	56	6
FRA	Adrian Mannarino	59	7
NOR	Casper Ruud	60	8

- ^{1} Rankings are as of September 9, 2019

=== Other entrants ===
The following players received wildcards into the singles main draw:

- (Russia) Evgeny Donskoy
- (Israel) Dudi Sela
- (Italy) Jannik Sinner

The following players received entry using a protected ranking into the main draw:

- (Slovakia) Jozef Kovalík
- (Serbia) Janko Tipsarević

The following players received entry from the qualifying draw:

- (Belarus) Egor Gerasimov
- (Belarus) Ilya Ivashka
- (Czech Republic) Lukáš Rosol
- (Russia) Alexey Vatutin

The following players received entry as lucky losers:

- (Bosnia and Herzegovina) Damir Džumhur
- (Italy) Matteo Viola

=== Withdrawals ===
Before the tournament

- (Czech Republic) Tomáš Berdych → replaced by (Bosnia and Herzegovina) Damir Džumhur
- (Serbia) Laslo Đere → replaced by (Italy) Matteo Viola
- (Serbia) Miomir Kecmanović → replaced by (Slovakia) Jozef Kovalík
- (France) Corentin Moutet → replaced by (Serbia) Janko Tipsarević
- (Switzerland) Stan Wawrinka → replaced by (Italy) Salvatore Caruso

=== Retirements ===
- (Hungary) Márton Fucsovics
- (Serbia) Janko Tipsarević

== Doubles main-draw entrants ==
=== Seeds ===
Country	Player	Country	Player	Rank^{1}	Seed
CRO	Nikola Mektić	CRO	Franko Škugor	50	1
BEL	Sander Gillé	BEL	Joran Vliegen	94	2
CZE	Roman Jebavý	AUT	Philipp Oswald	106	3
BRA	Marcelo Demoliner	NED	Matwé Middelkoop	114	4

- Rankings are as of September 9, 2019

=== Other entrants ===
The following pairs received wildcards into the doubles main draw:

- (Russia) Evgeny Donskoy / (Russia) Konstantin Kravchuk
- (Russia) Evgeny Karlovskiy / (Russia) Andrey Rublev

== Champions ==
=== Singles ===
- (Russia) Daniil Medvedev def. (Croatia) Borna Ćorić, 6–3, 6–1

=== Doubles ===
- (India) Divij Sharan / (Slovakia) Igor Zelenay def. (Italy) Matteo Berrettini / (Italy) Simone Bolelli, 6–3, 3–6, [10–8]
