= 2018 St. Petersburg Open =

- Date: September 17–23
- Edition: 23rd
- Category: ATP World Tour 250 Series
- Surface: Hard / indoors
- Location: St. Petersburg, Russia
- Venue: Sibur Arena

Champions

Singles
- (Austria) Dominic Thiem

Doubles
- (Italy) Matteo Berrettini / (Italy) Fabio Fognini
← 2017 ·	St. Petersburg Open	· 2019 →

The 2018 St. Petersburg Open was a tennis tournament played on indoor hard courts. It was the 23rd edition of the St. Petersburg Open, and part of the ATP World Tour 250 Series of the 2018 ATP World Tour. It took place at the Sibur Arena in Saint Petersburg, Russia, from September 17 through 23, 2018.

== Singles main-draw entrants ==
=== Seeds ===
Country	Player	Rank^{1}	Seed
AUT	Dominic Thiem	8	1
ITA	Fabio Fognini	13	2
ITA	Marco Cecchinato	22	3
RUS	Karen Khachanov	25	4
ESP	Roberto Bautista Agut	26	5
BIH	Damir Džumhur	28	6
CAN	Denis Shapovalov	34	7
RUS	Daniil Medvedev	35	8

- ^{1} Rankings are as of September 10, 2018

=== Other entrants ===
The following players received wildcards into the singles main draw:

- (Spain) Roberto Bautista Agut
- (Switzerland) Stan Wawrinka
- (Russia) Mikhail Youzhny

The following players received entry from the qualifying draw:

- (Belarus) Ilya Ivashka
- (Spain) Adrián Menéndez Maceiras
- (Austria) Lucas Miedler
- (Italy) Luca Vanni

The following player received entry as a lucky loser:

- (Belgium) Ruben Bemelmans

=== Withdrawals ===
Before the tournament

- (Cyprus) Marcos Baghdatis → replaced by (Belgium) Ruben Bemelmans
- (Slovakia) Jozef Kovalík → replaced by (Cyprus) Marcos Baghdatis
- (Argentina) Leonardo Mayer → replaced by (Russia) Evgeny Donskoy

== Doubles main-draw entrants ==
=== Seeds ===
Country	Player	Country	Player	Rank^{1}	Seed
GBR	Dominic Inglot	CRO	Franko Škugor	62	1
CHI	Julio Peralta	ARG	Horacio Zeballos	65	2
CZE	Roman Jebavý	NED	Matwé Middelkoop	80	3
SWE	Robert Lindstedt	USA	Rajeev Ram	98	4

- Rankings are as of September 10, 2018

=== Other entrants ===
The following pairs received wildcards into the doubles main draw:

- (Russia) Mikhail Elgin / (Uzbekistan) Denis Istomin
- (Russia) Teymuraz Gabashvili / (Russia) Evgeny Karlovskiy

=== Withdrawals ===
During the tournament

- (Uzbekistan) Denis Istomin

== Champions ==
=== Singles ===
- (Austria) Dominic Thiem def. (Slovakia) Martin Kližan, 6–3, 6–1

=== Doubles ===
- (Italy) Matteo Berrettini / (Italy) Fabio Fognini def. (Czech Republic) Roman Jebavý / (Netherlands) Matwé Middelkoop, 7–6^{(8–6)}, 7–6^{(7–4)}
