= 2017 St. Petersburg Open =

- Date: 18–24 September
- Edition: 22nd
- Category: ATP World Tour 250 Series
- Surface: Hard / indoors
- Location: St. Petersburg, Russia
- Venue: Sibur Arena

Champions

Singles
- (Bosnia and Herzegovina) Damir Džumhur

Doubles
- (Czech Republic) Roman Jebavý / (Netherlands) Matwé Middelkoop
| ← 2016 · | St. Petersburg Open | · 2018 → |

The 2017 St. Petersburg Open was a tennis tournament played on indoor hard courts. It was the 22nd edition of the St. Petersburg Open, and part of the ATP World Tour 250 Series of the 2017 ATP World Tour. It took place at the Sibur Arena in Saint Petersburg, Russia, from September 18 through 24, 2017.

== Singles main-draw entrants ==
=== Seeds ===
| Country | Player | Rank^{1} | Seed |
|---|---|---|---|
| ESP | Roberto Bautista Agut | 13 | 1 |
| FRA | Jo-Wilfried Tsonga | 18 | 2 |
| ITA | Fabio Fognini | 29 | 3 |
| FRA | Adrian Mannarino | 31 | 4 |
| GER | Philipp Kohlschreiber | 34 | 5 |
| ITA | Paolo Lorenzi | 38 | 6 |
| SRB | Viktor Troicki | 47 | 7 |
| GER | Jan-Lennard Struff | 54 | 8 |

- ^{1} Rankings are as of September 11, 2017

=== Other entrants ===
The following players received wildcards into the singles main draw:

- (Russia) Evgeny Donskoy
- (France) Jo-Wilfried Tsonga
- (Russia) Evgenii Tiurnev

The following player received entry using a protected ranking:

- (Lithuania) Ričardas Berankis

The following players received entry from the qualifying draw:

- (United Kingdom) Liam Broady
- (Latvia) Ernests Gulbis
- (Germany) Daniel Masur
- (Australia) John-Patrick Smith

The following player received entry as a lucky loser:

- (Moldova) Radu Albot

=== Withdrawals ===
Before the tournament

- (United Kingdom) Aljaž Bedene →replaced by (Italy) Thomas Fabbiano
- (Argentina) Federico Delbonis →replaced by (Russia) Mikhail Youzhny
- (United Kingdom) Kyle Edmund →replaced by (Argentina) Guido Pella
- (Argentina) Leonardo Mayer →replaced by (Bosnia and Herzegovina) Damir Džumhur
- (France) Gaël Monfils →replaced by (Cyprus) Marcos Baghdatis
- (Serbia) Janko Tipsarević →replaced by (Lithuania) Ričardas Berankis
- (Czech Republic) Jiří Veselý →replaced by (Moldova) Radu Albot

During the tournament

- (Germany) Philipp Kohlschreiber

== Doubles main-draw entrants ==
=== Seeds ===
| Country | Player | Country | Player | Rank^{1} | Seed |
|---|---|---|---|---|---|
| CHI | Julio Peralta | ARG | Horacio Zeballos | 69 | 1 |
| USA | Nicholas Monroe | AUS | John-Patrick Smith | 85 | 2 |
| GBR | Dominic Inglot | CAN | Daniel Nestor | 93 | 3 |
| NZL | Marcus Daniell | BRA | Marcelo Demoliner | 96 | 4 |

- Rankings are as of September 11, 2017

=== Other entrants ===
The following pairs received wildcards into the doubles main draw:

- (Russia) Evgeny Donskoy / (Russia) Mikhail Youzhny
- (Russia) Mikhail Elgin / (Russia) Alexander Kudryavtsev

== Finals ==
=== Singles ===
- (Bosnia and Herzegovina) Damir Džumhur defeated (Italy) Fabio Fognini, 3–6, 6–4, 6–2

=== Doubles ===
- (Czech Republic) Roman Jebavý / (Netherlands) Matwé Middelkoop defeated (Chile) Julio Peralta / (Argentina) Horacio Zeballos, 6–4, 6–4.
