= 2017 St. Petersburg Open – Doubles =

Doubles
- 2017 St. Petersburg Open

Final
- Champions: (Czech Republic) Roman Jebavý (Netherlands) Matwé Middelkoop
- Runners-up: (Chile) Julio Peralta (Argentina) Horacio Zeballos
- Score: 6–4, 6–4

Events
Singles	Doubles
← 2016 ·	St. Petersburg Open	· 2018 →

Dominic Inglot and Henri Kontinen were the defending champions, but Kontinen chose not to participate this year. Inglot played alongside Daniel Nestor, but lost in the quarterfinals to Roman Jebavý and Matwé Middelkoop.

Jebavý and Middelkoop went on to win the title, defeating Julio Peralta and Horacio Zeballos in the final, 6–4, 6–4.

== Seeds ==
1. (Chile) Julio Peralta / (Argentina) Horacio Zeballos (final)
2. (United States) Nicholas Monroe / (Australia) John-Patrick Smith (semifinals)
3. (United Kingdom) Dominic Inglot / (Canada) Daniel Nestor (quarterfinals)
4. (New Zealand) Marcus Daniell / (Brazil) Marcelo Demoliner (quarterfinals)

== Draw ==
Key

- Q = Qualifier
- WC = Wild card
- LL = Lucky loser
- Alt = Alternate
- ITF = ITF entry
- PR = Protected ranking
- SR = Special ranking
- SE = Special exempt
- JE = Junior exempt
- JR = Junior Accelerator Programme entrant
- CO = College Accelerator Programme entrant
- NG = Next Gen Accelerator Program entrant
- w/o = Walkover
- r = Retired
- d = Defaulted

=== Draw ===
First round
1	(Chile) J Peralta (Argentina) H Zeballos	6^{6}	6	[10]
(Thailand) Sa Ratiwatana (Thailand) So Ratiwatana	7^{8}	4	[7]
(Cyprus) M Baghdatis (Serbia) V Troicki	5	6	[10]
(Chile) H Podlipnik-Castillo (Belarus) A Vasilevski	7	4	[4]
4	(New Zealand) M Daniell (Brazil) M Demoliner	3	6	[10]
(Austria) J Knowle (Austria) A Peya	6	4	[6]
(India) L Paes (India) P Raja	6	6
(United States) J Cerretani (Italy) F Fognini	3	4
(Czech Republic) R Jebavý (Netherlands) M Middelkoop	6	6
(Brazil) R Dutra Silva (Italy) P Lorenzi	3	2
(Bosnia and Herzegovina) D Džumhur (Italy) T Fabbiano	6	3	[6]
3	(United Kingdom) D Inglot (Canada) D Nestor	2	6	[10]
WC	(Russia) M Elgin (Russia) A Kudryavtsev	6^{5}	6	[2]
WC	(Russia) E Donskoy (Russia) M Youzhny	7^{7}	3	[10]
(Germany) J-L Struff (Czech Republic) J Veselý	7^{7}	2	[7]
2	(United States) N Monroe (Australia) J-P Smith	6^{4}	6	[10]

Quarterfinals
1	(Chile) J Peralta (Argentina) H Zeballos	6	6
(Cyprus) M Baghdatis (Serbia) V Troicki	3	0
4	(New Zealand) M Daniell (Brazil) M Demoliner	4	2
(India) L Paes (India) P Raja	6	6
(Czech Republic) R Jebavý (Netherlands) M Middelkoop	6^{10}	7	[10]
3	(United Kingdom) D Inglot (Canada) D Nestor	7^{12}	5	[4]
WC	(Russia) E Donskoy (Russia) M Youzhny	4	2
2	(United States) N Monroe (Australia) J-P Smith	6	6

Semifinals
1	(Chile) J Peralta (Argentina) H Zeballos	4	6	[10]
(India) L Paes (India) P Raja	6	3	[7]
(Czech Republic) R Jebavý (Netherlands) M Middelkoop	6	6
2	(United States) N Monroe (Australia) J-P Smith	4	1

Final
1	(Chile) J Peralta (Argentina) H Zeballos	4	4
(Czech Republic) R Jebavý (Netherlands) M Middelkoop	6	6
