= 2019 St. Petersburg Open – Doubles =

Doubles
- 2019 St. Petersburg Open

Final
- Champions: (India) Divij Sharan (Slovakia) Igor Zelenay
- Runners-up: (Italy) Matteo Berrettini (Italy) Simone Bolelli
- Score: 6–3, 3–6, [10–8]

Events
Singles	Doubles
← 2018 ·	St. Petersburg Open	· 2020 →

Matteo Berrettini and Fabio Fognini were the defending champions, but Fognini chose not to participate this year. Berrettini played alongside Simone Bolelli, but lost in the final to Divij Sharan and Igor Zelenay, 3–6, 6–3, [8–10].

== Seeds ==
1. (Croatia) Nikola Mektić / (Croatia) Franko Škugor (semifinals)
2. (Belgium) Sander Gillé / (Belgium) Joran Vliegen (semifinals)
3. (Czech Republic) Roman Jebavý / (Austria) Philipp Oswald (first round)
4. (Brazil) Marcelo Demoliner / (Netherlands) Matwé Middelkoop (first round)

== Draw ==
=== Key ===
- Q = Qualifier
- WC = Wild card
- LL = Lucky loser
- Alt = Alternate
- SE = Special exempt
- PR = Protected ranking
- ITF = ITF entry
- JE = Junior exempt
- w/o = Walkover
- r = Retired
- d = Defaulted
- SR = Special ranking

=== Draw ===
First round
1	(Croatia) N Mektić (Croatia) F Škugor	6	6
PR	(Lithuania) R Berankis (Serbia) J Tipsarević	3	4
(United States) N Monroe (Belarus) A Vasilevski	6	6
WC	(Russia) E Donskoy (Russia) K Kravchuk	3	2
4	(Brazil) M Demoliner (Netherlands) M Middelkoop	6	2	[5]
(India) D Sharan (Slovakia) I Zelenay	3	6	[10]
WC	(Russia) E Karlovskiy (Russia) A Rublev	7^{7}	2	[2]
(Spain) R Carballés Baena (Argentina) A Molteni	6^{5}	6	[10]
(Denmark) F Nielsen (Germany) T Pütz	6	6
(Hungary) M Fucsovics (Italy) S Travaglia	4	4
(Italy) M Berrettini (Italy) S Bolelli	6	6
3	(Czech Republic) R Jebavý (Austria) P Oswald	2	2
(Kazakhstan) A Bublik (Kazakhstan) M Kukushkin	6^{4}	3
(France) A Mannarino (Monaco) H Nys	7^{7}	6
PR	(Slovakia) J Kovalík (Chile) H Podlipnik Castillo	4	4
2	(Belgium) S Gillé (Belgium) J Vliegen	6	6

Quarterfinals
1	(Croatia) N Mektić (Croatia) F Škugor	6	6
(United States) N Monroe (Belarus) A Vasilevski	4	2
(India) D Sharan (Slovakia) I Zelenay	7	5	[10]
(Spain) R Carballés Baena (Argentina) A Molteni	5	7	[5]
(Denmark) F Nielsen (Germany) T Pütz	4	6	[7]
(Italy) M Berrettini (Italy) S Bolelli	6	4	[10]
(France) A Mannarino (Monaco) H Nys	4	4
2	(Belgium) S Gillé (Belgium) J Vliegen	6	6

Semifinals
1	(Croatia) N Mektić (Croatia) F Škugor	5	1
(India) D Sharan (Slovakia) I Zelenay	7	6
(Italy) M Berrettini (Italy) S Bolelli	7	7
2	(Belgium) S Gillé (Belgium) J Vliegen	5	5

Final
(India) D Sharan (Slovakia) I Zelenay	6	3	[10]
(Italy) M Berrettini (Italy) S Bolelli	3	6	[8]
