= 2020 St. Petersburg Open – Doubles =

Doubles
- 2020 St. Petersburg Open

Final
- Champions: (Austria) Jürgen Melzer (France) Édouard Roger-Vasselin
- Runners-up: (Brazil) Marcelo Demoliner (Netherlands) Matwé Middelkoop
- Score: 6–2, 7–6^{(7–4)}

Events
Singles	Doubles
← 2019 ·	St. Petersburg Open	· 2021 →

Divij Sharan and Igor Zelenay were the defending champions, but both players chose not to participate. Sharan is instead participating at the Cologne tournament and Zelenay at the Sardinia tournament.

Jürgen Melzer and Édouard Roger-Vasselin won the title, defeating Marcelo Demoliner and Matwé Middelkoop in the final, 6–2, 7–6^{(7–4)}.

== Seeds ==
1. (United Kingdom) Jamie Murray / (United Kingdom) Neal Skupski (first round)
2. (Austria) Jürgen Melzer / (France) Édouard Roger-Vasselin (champions)
3. (Belgium) Sander Gillé / (Belgium) Joran Vliegen (first round)
4. (Australia) Max Purcell / (Australia) Luke Saville (first round)

== Draw ==
Key

- Q = Qualifier
- WC = Wild card
- LL = Lucky loser
- Alt = Alternate
- ITF = ITF entry
- PR = Protected ranking
- SR = Special ranking
- SE = Special exempt
- JE = Junior exempt
- JR = Junior Accelerator Programme entrant
- CO = College Accelerator Programme entrant
- NG = Next Gen Accelerator Program entrant
- w/o = Walkover
- r = Retired
- d = Defaulted

=== Draw ===
First round
1	(United Kingdom) J Murray (United Kingdom) N Skupski	7^{8}	3	[11]
(Russia) K Khachanov (Russia) A Rublev	6^{6}	6	[13]
(Kazakhstan) A Bublik (United States) R Opelka	2	7^{7}	[10]
(Serbia) N Ćaćić (Serbia) M Kecmanović	6	6^{5}	[8]
3	(Belgium) S Gillé (Belgium) J Vliegen	6^{1}	6^{7}
(Brazil) M Demoliner (Netherlands) M Middelkoop	7^{7}	7^{9}
(United States) T Fritz (United Kingdom) C Norrie	3	6	[10]
(United Kingdom) L Bambridge (United Kingdom) D Evans	6	3	[5]
(France) A Mannarino (France) F Martin	6	5	[10]
WC	(Israel) J Erlich (Belarus) A Vasilevski	3	7	[8]
(Japan) B McLachlan (Croatia) F Škugor	6	6
4	(Australia) M Purcell (Australia) L Saville	3	2
WC	(Russia) D Golubev (Russia) E Tiurnev	w/o
LL	(Australia) J Duckworth (Belarus) I Ivashka
Q	(Russia) E Donskoy (Russia) R Safiullin	2	6^{3}
2	(Austria) J Melzer (France) É Roger-Vasselin	6	7^{7}

Quarterfinals
(Russia) K Khachanov (Russia) A Rublev	3	6	[9]
(Kazakhstan) A Bublik (United States) R Opelka	6	1	[11]
(Brazil) M Demoliner (Netherlands) M Middelkoop	6	6
(United States) T Fritz (United Kingdom) C Norrie	4	4
(France) A Mannarino (France) F Martin	5	4
(Japan) B McLachlan (Croatia) F Škugor	7	6
WC	(Russia) D Golubev (Russia) E Tiurnev	6	1	[8]
2	(Austria) J Melzer (France) É Roger-Vasselin	4	6	[10]

Semifinals
(Kazakhstan) A Bublik (United States) R Opelka	4	6	[6]
(Brazil) M Demoliner (Netherlands) M Middelkoop	6	3	[10]
(Japan) B McLachlan (Croatia) F Škugor	6	6^{4}	[7]
2	(Austria) J Melzer (France) É Roger-Vasselin	3	7^{7}	[10]

Final
(Brazil) M Demoliner (Netherlands) M Middelkoop	2	6^{4}
2	(Austria) J Melzer (France) É Roger-Vasselin	6	7^{7}

== Qualifying ==
=== Seeds ===
1. (Australia) James Duckworth / (Belarus) Ilya Ivashka (qualifying competition, Lucky losers)
2. (Belarus) Egor Gerasimov / (Kazakhstan) Mikhail Kukushkin (first round)

=== Qualifiers ===
1. (Russia) Evgeny Donskoy / (Russia) Roman Safiullin

=== Lucky losers ===
1. (Australia) James Duckworth / (Belarus) Ilya Ivashka

=== Qualifying draw ===
First round
1	(Australia) James Duckworth (Belarus) Ilya Ivashka	6^{6}	6	[10]
PR	(United States) Mackenzie McDonald (United States) J. J. Wolf	7^{8}	1	[5]
WC	(Russia) Evgeny Donskoy (Russia) Roman Safiullin	7	6
2	(Belarus) Egor Gerasimov (Kazakhstan) Mikhail Kukushkin	5	4

Qualifying competition
1	(Australia) James Duckworth (Belarus) Ilya Ivashka	3	5
WC	(Russia) Evgeny Donskoy (Russia) Roman Safiullin	6	7
