= 2017 St. Petersburg Open – Singles =

Singles
- 2017 St. Petersburg Open

Final
- Champion: (Bosnia and Herzegovina) Damir Džumhur
- Runner-up: (Italy) Fabio Fognini
- Score: 3–6, 6–4, 6–2

Details
- Draw: 28 (4 Q / 3 WC )
- Seeds: 8

Events
Singles	Doubles
← 2016 ·	St. Petersburg Open	· 2018 →

Alexander Zverev was the defending champion, but chose not to participate this year.

Damir Džumhur won his first ATP World Tour title, defeating Fabio Fognini in the final, 3–6, 6–4, 6–2. Džumhur became the first player from Bosnia and Herzegovina to win an ATP Tour title.

== Seeds ==
The top four seeds receive a bye into the second round.

1. (Spain) Roberto Bautista Agut (semifinals)
2. (France) Jo-Wilfried Tsonga (quarterfinals)
3. (Italy) Fabio Fognini (final)
4. (France) Adrian Mannarino (second round)
5. (Germany) Philipp Kohlschreiber (second round, withdrew)
6. (Italy) Paolo Lorenzi (first round)
7. (Serbia) Viktor Troicki (quarterfinals)
8. (Germany) Jan-Lennard Struff (semifinals)

== Draw ==
Key

- Q = Qualifier
- WC = Wild card
- LL = Lucky loser
- Alt = Alternate
- ITF = ITF entry
- PR = Protected ranking
- SR = Special ranking
- SE = Special exempt
- JE = Junior exempt
- JR = Junior Accelerator Programme entrant
- CO = College Accelerator Programme entrant
- NG = Next Gen Accelerator Program entrant
- w/o = Walkover
- r = Retired
- d = Defaulted

=== Finals ===
Semifinals
1	(Spain) Roberto Bautista Agut	6	6^{7}	6^{5}
3	(Italy) Fabio Fognini	2	7^{9}	7^{7}
(Bosnia and Herzegovina) Damir Džumhur	6	7
8	(Germany) Jan-Lennard Struff	3	5

Finals
3	(Italy) Fabio Fognini	6	4	2
(Bosnia and Herzegovina) Damir Džumhur	3	6	6

=== Top half ===
First round
(Brazil) R Dutra Silva	2	6	6
LL	(Moldova) R Albot	6	2	2
(Serbia) D Lajović	6^{4}	3
(Argentina) G Pella	7^{7}	6
(Russia) A Kuznetsov	6^{6}	6^{2}
7	(Serbia) V Troicki	7^{8}	7^{7}
Q	(Australia) J-P Smith	6^{6}	4
(Russia) M Youzhny	7^{8}	6
PR	(Lithuania) R Berankis	3	6	6
Q	(Germany) D Masur	6	3	2
WC	(Russia) E Tyurnev	1	3
5	(Germany) P Kohlschreiber	6	6

Second round
1	(Spain) R Bautista Agut	6	4	6
(Brazil) R Dutra Silva	4	6	0
(Argentina) G Pella	6^{3}	6	4
7	(Serbia) V Troicki	7^{7}	4	6
3	(Italy) F Fognini	6	4	6
(Russia) M Youzhny	4	6	4
PR	(Lithuania) R Berankis	w/o
5	(Germany) P Kohlschreiber

Quarterfinals
1	(Spain) R Bautista Agut	6	6
7	(Serbia) V Troicki	1	2
3	(Italy) F Fognini	6	6
PR	(Lithuania) R Berankis	3	0

Semifinals
1	(Spain) R Bautista Agut	6	6^{7}	6^{5}
3	(Italy) F Fognini	2	7^{9}	7^{7}

=== Bottom half ===
First round
6	(Italy) P Lorenzi	5	5
(Bosnia and Herzegovina) D Džumhur	7	7
(Cyprus) M Baghdatis	7	6
(Argentina) H Zeballos	5	4
Q	(Latvia) E Gulbis	3	0
Q	(United Kingdom) L Broady	6	6
8	(Germany) J-L Struff	3	6	6
(Croatia) B Ćorić	6	2	4
(Russia) D Medvedev	6^{4}	5
(Italy) T Fabbiano	7^{7}	7
(Portugal) J Sousa	7^{7}	6
WC	(Russia) E Donskoy	6^{2}	3

Second round
(Bosnia and Herzegovina) D Džumhur	6	7^{7}
(Cyprus) M Baghdatis	4	6^{4}
Q	(United Kingdom) L Broady	2	6	6
4	(France) A Mannarino	6	4	0
8	(Germany) J-L Struff	6	6
(Italy) T Fabbiano	1	4
(Portugal) J Sousa	6^{1}	6	2
2/WC	(France) J-W Tsonga	7^{7}	3	6

Quarterfinals
(Bosnia and Herzegovina) D Džumhur	6	2	6
Q	(United Kingdom) L Broady	3	6	4
8	(Germany) J-L Struff	3	6	6
2/WC	(France) J-W Tsonga	6	3	2

Semifinals
(Bosnia and Herzegovina) D Džumhur	6	7
8	(Germany) J-L Struff	3	5

== Qualifying ==
=== Seeds ===
1. (Moldova) Radu Albot (qualifying competition, lucky loser)
2. (Australia) John-Patrick Smith (qualified)
3. (Russia) Alexey Vatutin (qualifying competition)
4. (Latvia) Ernests Gulbis (qualified)
5. (Russia) Teymuraz Gabashvili (first round)
6. (United Kingdom) Liam Broady (qualified)
7. (Czech Republic) Petr Michnev (first round)
8. (Serbia) Peđa Krstin (first round)

=== Qualifiers ===
1. (United Kingdom) Liam Broady
2. (Australia) John-Patrick Smith
3. (Germany) Daniel Masur
4. (Latvia) Ernests Gulbis

=== Lucky loser ===
1. (Moldova) Radu Albot

=== Qualifying draw ===
==== First qualifier ====
First round
1	(Moldova) Radu Albot	7	7
(Russia) Alexander Kudryavtsev	5	5
(Slovakia) Filip Horanský	3	1
6	(United Kingdom) Liam Broady	6	6

Qualifying competition
1	(Moldova) Radu Albot	1	6	6^{4}
6	(United Kingdom) Liam Broady	6	2	7^{7}

==== Second qualifier ====
First round
2	(Australia) John-Patrick Smith	6	6
(Russia) Ivan Gakhov	2	0
WC	(Russia) Mikhail Elgin	7^{7}	6
7	(Czech Republic) Petr Michnev	6^{2}	4

Qualifying competition
2	(Australia) John-Patrick Smith	7^{7}	6
WC	(Russia) Mikhail Elgin	6^{4}	2

==== Third qualifier ====
First round
3	(Russia) Alexey Vatutin	7	6
(Russia) Evgeny Karlovskiy	5	0
(Germany) Daniel Masur	3	6	7
5	(Russia) Teymuraz Gabashvili	6	1	5

Qualifying competition
3	(Russia) Alexey Vatutin	2	2
(Germany) Daniel Masur	6	6

==== Fourth qualifier ====
First round
4	(Latvia) Ernests Gulbis	4	6	6
WC	(Russia) Alexander Vasilenko	6	3	2
(Russia) Ivan Nedelko	6	6
8	(Serbia) Peđa Krstin	3	4

Qualifying competition
4	(Latvia) Ernests Gulbis	6	6
(Russia) Ivan Nedelko	2	1
