= 2020 St. Petersburg Open – Singles =

Singles
- 2020 St. Petersburg Open

Final
- Champion: (Russia) Andrey Rublev
- Runner-up: (Croatia) Borna Ćorić
- Score: 7–6^{(7–5)}, 6–4

Details
- Draw: 32 (4 Q / 3 WC )
- Seeds: 8

Events
Singles	Doubles
← 2019 ·	St. Petersburg Open	· 2021 →

The tournament was played on a hard surface. Due to the ongoing COVID-19 pandemic and many ATP tournaments having been cancelled, this year's event was upgraded to ATP 500 level.

Andrey Rublev won the title, defeating last year finalist Borna Ćorić in the final, 7–6^{(7–5)}, 6–4.

Daniil Medvedev was the defending champion, but lost in the second round to Reilly Opelka.

== Seeds ==
1. (Russia) Daniil Medvedev (second round)
2. (Canada) Denis Shapovalov (semifinals)
3. (Russia) Andrey Rublev (champion)
4. (Russia) Karen Khachanov (quarterfinals)
5. (Switzerland) Stan Wawrinka (quarterfinals)
6. (Canada) Milos Raonic (semifinals)
7. (Croatia) Borna Ćorić (final)
8. (United States) Taylor Fritz (first round)

== Draw ==
Key

- Q = Qualifier
- WC = Wild card
- LL = Lucky loser
- Alt = Alternate
- ITF = ITF entry
- PR = Protected ranking
- SR = Special ranking
- SE = Special exempt
- JE = Junior exempt
- JR = Junior Accelerator Programme entrant
- CO = College Accelerator Programme entrant
- NG = Next Gen Accelerator Program entrant
- w/o = Walkover
- r = Retired
- d = Defaulted

=== Finals ===
Semifinals
7	(Croatia) Borna Ćorić	1	6	6
6	(Canada) Milos Raonic	6	1	4
3	(Russia) Andrey Rublev	4	6	6
2	(Canada) Denis Shapovalov	6	3	4

Final
7	(Croatia) Borna Ćorić	6^{5}	4
3	(Russia) Andrey Rublev	7^{7}	6

=== Top half ===
First round
1	(Russia) D Medvedev	3	6	6
(France) R Gasquet	6	3	0
Q	(Croatia) N Serdarušić	6	6^{5}	2
(United States) R Opelka	3	7^{7}	6
WC	(Russia) R Safiullin	6	6
LL	(Ecuador) E Gómez	4	2
(Spain) F López	3	6^{2}
7	(Croatia) B Ćorić	6	7^{7}
4	(Russia) K Khachanov	6	6
(Australia) J Duckworth	4	4
(United States) T Sandgren	5	6	5
WC	(Russia) A Karatsev	7	3	7
(Kazakhstan) A Bublik	2	7^{7}	6
PR	(United States) M McDonald	6	6^{2}	4
Q	(United States) JJ Wolf	6^{5}	1
6	(Canada) M Raonic	7^{7}	6

Second round
1	(Russia) D Medvedev	6	5	4
(United States) R Opelka	2	7	6
WC	(Russia) R Safiullin	3	5
7	(Croatia) B Ćorić	6	7
4	(Russia) K Khachanov	4	7	6
WC	(Russia) A Karatsev	6	5	3
(Kazakhstan) A Bublik	3	2
6	(Canada) M Raonic	6	6

Quarterfinals
(United States) R Opelka	6^{3}	3
7	(Croatia) B Ćorić	7^{7}	6
4	(Russia) K Khachanov	1	6^{1}
6	(Canada) M Raonic	6	7^{7}

Semifinals
7	(Croatia) B Ćorić	1	6	6
6	(Canada) M Raonic	6	1	4

=== Bottom half ===
First round
8	(United States) T Fritz	4	6	3
(United Kingdom) C Norrie	6	4	6
(Kazakhstan) M Kukushkin	3	6^{7}
(Serbia) M Kecmanović	6	7^{9}
Q	(Russia) P Kotov	6	2	3
(France) U Humbert	4	6	6
(Canada) V Pospisil	2	4
3	(Russia) A Rublev	6	6
5	(Switzerland) S Wawrinka	3	7^{7}	7
(United Kingdom) D Evans	6	6^{3}	5
WC	(Russia) E Donskoy	6	7^{7}
(Belarus) E Gerasimov	4	6^{4}
(France) A Mannarino	3	6^{6}
Q	(Belarus) I Ivashka	6	7^{8}
LL	(Serbia) V Troicki	2	3
2	(Canada) D Shapovalov	6	6

Second round
(United Kingdom) C Norrie	7	6^{5}	6
(Serbia) M Kecmanović	5	7^{7}	3
(France) U Humbert	6	4	5
3	(Russia) A Rublev	4	6	7
5	(Switzerland) S Wawrinka	6	3	6
WC	(Russia) E Donskoy	1	6	3
Q	(Belarus) I Ivashka	1	4
2	(Canada) D Shapovalov	6	6

Quarterfinals
(United Kingdom) C Norrie	2	1
3	(Russia) A Rublev	6	6
5	(Switzerland) S Wawrinka	4	5
2	(Canada) D Shapovalov	6	7

Semifinals
3	(Russia) A Rublev	4	6	6
2	(Canada) D Shapovalov	6	3	4

== Qualifying ==
=== Seeds ===
1. (United States) J. J. Wolf (qualified)
2. (Belarus) Ilya Ivashka (qualified)
3. (Serbia) Nikola Milojević (qualifying competition)
4. (Ecuador) Emilio Gómez (qualifying competition, lucky loser)
5. (Latvia) Ernests Gulbis (first round)
6. (Austria) Jurij Rodionov (first round)
7. (Serbia) Viktor Troicki (qualifying competition, lucky loser)
8. (Turkey) Cem İlkel (first round)

=== Qualifiers ===
1. (United States) J. J. Wolf
2. (Belarus) Ilya Ivashka
3. (Croatia) Nino Serdarušić
4. (Russia) Pavel Kotov

=== Lucky losers ===
1. (Ecuador) Emilio Gómez
2. (Serbia) Viktor Troicki

=== Qualifying draw ===
==== First qualifier ====
First round
1	(United States) J. J. Wolf	4	6	6
(Russia) Alexey Vatutin	6	1	3
WC	(Russia) Alen Avidzba	4	6	7^{7}
5	(Latvia) Ernests Gulbis	6	3	6^{2}

Qualifying competition
1	(United States) J. J. Wolf	3	7	6
WC	(Russia) Alen Avidzba	6	5	1

==== Second qualifier ====
First round
2	(Belarus) Ilya Ivashka	7	6
(Australia) Max Purcell	5	4
PR	(Russia) Andrey Kuznetsov	3	7^{7}	4
7	(Serbia) Viktor Troicki	6	6^{5}	6

Qualifying competition
2	(Belarus) Ilya Ivashka	7	6
7	(Serbia) Viktor Troicki	5	1

==== Third qualifier ====
First round
3	(Serbia) Nikola Milojević	6	6
(Russia) Evgeny Karlovskiy	4	0
WC	(Croatia) Nino Serdarušić	7^{7}	3	6
8	(Turkey) Cem İlkel	6^{5}	6	4

Qualifying competition
3	(Serbia) Nikola Milojević	7^{7}	2	2
WC	(Croatia) Nino Serdarušić	6^{1}	6	6

==== Fourth qualifier ====
First round
4	(Ecuador) Emilio Gómez	7^{9}	1	6
(Russia) Teymuraz Gabashvili	6^{7}	6	4
WC	(Russia) Pavel Kotov	6	3	7
6	(Austria) Jurij Rodionov	4	6	5

Qualifying competition
4	(Ecuador) Emilio Gómez	7	6^{4}	2
WC	(Russia) Pavel Kotov	5	7^{7}	6
