= 2018 St. Petersburg Open – Singles =

Singles
- 2018 St. Petersburg Open

Final
- Champion: (Austria) Dominic Thiem
- Runner-up: (Slovakia) Martin Kližan
- Score: 6–3, 6–1

Details
- Draw: 28 (4 Q / 3 WC )
- Seeds: 8

Events
Singles	Doubles
← 2017 ·	St. Petersburg Open	· 2019 →

Damir Džumhur was the defending champion, but lost in the quarterfinals to Stan Wawrinka.

Dominic Thiem won the title after defeating Martin Kližan 6–3, 6–1 in the final. Notably, this was Kližan's first defeat in a deciding match, after 10 consecutive titles at ATP World Tour level.

The tournament marked the last appearance of Mikhail Youzhny in professional tennis.

== Seeds ==
The top four seeds receive a bye into the second round.

1. (Austria) Dominic Thiem (champion)
2. (Italy) Fabio Fognini (second round)
3. (Italy) Marco Cecchinato (quarterfinals)
4. (Russia) Karen Khachanov (second round)
5. (Spain) Roberto Bautista Agut (semifinals)
6. (Bosnia and Herzegovina) Damir Džumhur (quarterfinals)
7. (Canada) Denis Shapovalov (quarterfinals)
8. (Russia) Daniil Medvedev (quarterfinals)

== Draw ==
=== Key ===
- Q = Qualifier
- WC = Wild card
- LL = Lucky loser
- Alt = Alternate
- SE = Special exempt
- PR = Protected ranking
- ITF = ITF entry
- JE = Junior exempt
- w/o = Walkover
- r = Retired
- d = Defaulted
- SR = Special ranking

=== Finals ===
Semifinals
1	(Austria) Dominic Thiem	6	6
5/WC	(Spain) Roberto Bautista Agut	4	3
WC	(Switzerland) Stan Wawrinka	6	3	5
(Slovakia) Martin Kližan	4	6	7

Final
1	(Austria) Dominic Thiem	6	6
(Slovakia) Martin Kližan	3	1

=== Top half ===
First round
(Russia) A Rublev	4	6^{6}
(Germany) J-L Struff	6	7^{8}
(Kazakhstan) M Kukushkin	7	2
(Uzbekistan) D Istomin	5	4^{r}
(Portugal) J Sousa	4	1
8	(Russia) D Medvedev	6	6
LL	(Belgium) R Bemelmans	2	6	5
(Slovakia) L Lacko	6	4	7
(Bosnia and Herzegovina) M Bašić	6^{6}	4
WC	(Russia) M Youzhny	7^{8}	6
Q	(Italy) L Vanni	5	2
5/WC	(Spain) R Bautista Agut	7	6

Second round
1	(Austria) D Thiem	7^{7}	6
(Germany) J-L Struff	6^{4}	4
(Kazakhstan) M Kukushkin	3	4
8	(Russia) D Medvedev	6	6
3	(Italy) M Cecchinato	7	7^{8}
(Slovakia) L Lacko	5	6^{6}
WC	(Russia) M Youzhny	6^{6}	6	3
5/WC	(Spain) R Bautista Agut	7^{8}	3	6

Quarterfinals
1	(Austria) D Thiem	6	3	7^{7}
8	(Russia) D Medvedev	2	6	6^{2}
3	(Italy) M Cecchinato	6^{0}	3
5/WC	(Spain) R Bautista Agut	7^{7}	6

Semifinals
1	(Austria) D Thiem	6	6
5/WC	(Spain) R Bautista Agut	4	3

=== Bottom half ===
First round
6	(Bosnia and Herzegovina) D Džumhur	7	6
Q	(Austria) L Miedler	5	3
Q	(Belarus) I Ivashka	6	3	4
(Argentina) G Pella	4	6	6
(Slovenia) A Bedene	5	6^{5}
WC	(Switzerland) S Wawrinka	7	7^{7}
7	(Canada) D Shapovalov	7^{7}	6
Q	(Spain) A Menéndez Maceiras	6^{3}	2
(Spain) G García López	6^{5}	6	3
(Italy) M Berrettini	7^{7}	2	6
(Russia) E Donskoy	4	4
(Slovakia) M Kližan	6	6

Second round
6	(Bosnia and Herzegovina) D Džumhur	6	6
(Argentina) G Pella	4	4
WC	(Switzerland) S Wawrinka	7^{12}	7^{7}
4	(Russia) K Khachanov	6^{10}	6^{1}
7	(Canada) D Shapovalov	7^{8}	4	6
(Italy) M Berrettini	6^{6}	6	0
(Slovakia) M Kližan	6	6
2	(Italy) F Fognini	3	4

Quarterfinals
6	(Bosnia and Herzegovina) D Džumhur	3	4
WC	(Switzerland) S Wawrinka	6	6
7	(Canada) D Shapovalov	6	5	3
(Slovakia) M Kližan	3	7	6

Semifinals
WC	(Switzerland) S Wawrinka	6	3	5
(Slovakia) M Kližan	4	6	7

== Qualifying ==
=== Seeds ===
1. (Italy) Lorenzo Sonego (first round)
2. (Belarus) Ilya Ivashka (qualified)
3. (Belgium) Ruben Bemelmans (qualifying competition, lucky loser)
4. (Serbia) Viktor Troicki (first round)
5. (Spain) Adrián Menéndez Maceiras (qualified)
6. (France) Stéphane Robert (first round)
7. (Italy) Luca Vanni (qualified)
8. (Russia) Alexey Vatutin (first round)

=== Qualifiers ===
1. (Italy) Luca Vanni
2. (Belarus) Ilya Ivashka
3. (Spain) Adrián Menéndez Maceiras
4. (Austria) Lucas Miedler

=== Lucky loser ===
1. (Belgium) Ruben Bemelmans

=== Qualifying draw ===
==== First qualifier ====
First round
1	(Italy) Lorenzo Sonego	6	4	5
WC	(Russia) Roman Safiullin	3	6	7
(Germany) Daniel Brands	4	6	5
7	(Italy) Luca Vanni	6	4	7

Qualifying competition
WC	(Russia) Roman Safiullin	4	4
7	(Italy) Luca Vanni	6	6

==== Second qualifier ====
First round
2	(Belarus) Ilya Ivashka	2	7^{8}	6
Alt	(Russia) Evgeny Karlovskiy	6	6^{6}	4
WC	(Russia) Evgenii Tiurnev	6	6
6	(France) Stéphane Robert	3	4

Qualifying competition
2	(Belarus) Ilya Ivashka	7^{7}	7^{7}
WC	(Russia) Evgenii Tiurnev	6^{4}	6^{3}

==== Third qualifier ====
First round
3	(Belgium) Ruben Bemelmans	6	4	7^{7}
PR	(Belarus) Egor Gerasimov	2	6	6^{4}
(Russia) Ivan Nedelko	2	3
5	(Spain) Adrián Menéndez Maceiras	6	6

Qualifying competition
3	(Belgium) Ruben Bemelmans	6	2	3
5	(Spain) Adrián Menéndez Maceiras	4	6	6

==== Fourth qualifier ====
First round
4	(Serbia) Viktor Troicki	2	3
(Austria) Lucas Miedler	6	6
(Belarus) Uladzimir Ignatik	7	6
8	(Russia) Alexey Vatutin	5	4

Qualifying competition
(Austria) Lucas Miedler	7	6
(Belarus) Uladzimir Ignatik	5	2
