= 2019 St. Petersburg Open – Singles =

Singles
- 2019 St. Petersburg Open

Final
- Champion: (Russia) Daniil Medvedev
- Runner-up: (Croatia) Borna Ćorić
- Score: 6–3, 6–1

Details
- Draw: 28 (4 Q / 3 WC )
- Seeds: 8

Events
Singles	Doubles
← 2018 ·	St. Petersburg Open	· 2020 →

Dominic Thiem was the defending champion, but chose to compete in the Laver Cup instead.

Daniil Medvedev won the title, defeating Borna Ćorić in the final, 6–3, 6–1. Medvedev became the first active player outside the Big Four to reach the final in five consecutive tournaments.

== Seeds ==
The top four seeds receive a bye into the second round.

1. (Russia) Daniil Medvedev (champion)
2. (Russia) Karen Khachanov (second round)
3. (Italy) Matteo Berrettini (quarterfinals)
4. (Croatia) Borna Ćorić (final)
5. (Russia) Andrey Rublev (quarterfinals)
6. (Kazakhstan) Mikhail Kukushkin (quarterfinals)
7. (France) Adrian Mannarino (second round)
8. (Norway) Casper Ruud (quarterfinals)

== Draw ==
=== Key ===
- Q = Qualifier
- WC = Wild card
- LL = Lucky loser
- Alt = Alternate
- SE = Special exempt
- PR = Protected ranking
- ITF = ITF entry
- JE = Junior exempt
- w/o = Walkover
- r = Retired
- d = Defaulted
- SR = Special ranking

=== Finals ===
Semifinals
1	(Russia) Daniil Medvedev	7	7
Q	(Belarus) Egor Gerasimov	5	5
4	(Croatia) Borna Ćorić	3	7^{7}	6
(Portugal) João Sousa	6	6^{5}	1

Finals
1	(Russia) Daniil Medvedev	6	6
4	(Croatia) Borna Ćorić	3	1

=== Top half ===
First round
WC	(Russia) E Donskoy	6	6
LL	(Italy) M Viola	2	1
WC	(Israel) D Sela	3	0
(Lithuania) R Berankis	6	6
Q	(Belarus) I Ivashka	6	0	4
5	(Russia) A Rublev	4	6	6
(Spain) R Carballés Baena	6	7
(Slovakia) M Kližan	2	5
Q	(Czech Republic) L Rosol	5	2
Q	(Belarus) E Gerasimov	7	6
(Italy) S Travaglia	5	2
7	(France) A Mannarino	7	6

Second round
1	(Russia) D Medvedev	7	6
WC	(Russia) E Donskoy	5	3
(Lithuania) R Berankis	4	7^{7}	1
5	(Russia) A Rublev	6	6^{5}	6
3	(Italy) M Berrettini	6	6
(Spain) R Carballés Baena	1	2
Q	(Belarus) E Gerasimov	6	6
7	(France) A Mannarino	3	1

Quarterfinals
1	(Russia) D Medvedev	6	7
5	(Russia) A Rublev	4	5
3	(Italy) M Berrettini	6^{5}	6^{3}
Q	(Belarus) E Gerasimov	7^{7}	7^{7}

Semifinals
1	(Russia) D Medvedev	7	7
Q	(Belarus) E Gerasimov	5	5

=== Bottom half ===
First round
8	(Norway) C Ruud	6^{3}	6	6
(Kazakhstan) A Bublik	7^{7}	4	2
(Italy) S Caruso	2	6	6
(Italy) T Fabbiano	6	3	3
Q	(Russia) A Vatutin	5	1
(Hungary) M Fucsovics	7	6
6	(Kazakhstan) M Kukushkin	6	7^{7}
WC	(Italy) J Sinner	3	6^{4}
PR	(Serbia) J Tipsarević	5	6	1^{r}
LL	(Bosnia and Herzegovina) D Džumhur	7	3	3
(Portugal) J Sousa	6	6
PR	(Slovakia) J Kovalík	2	3

Second round
8	(Norway) C Ruud	6	6
(Italy) S Caruso	3	4
(Hungary) M Fucsovics	7^{7}	5	0^{r}
4	(Croatia) B Ćorić	6^{5}	7	3
6	(Kazakhstan) M Kukushkin	7^{7}	6
LL	(Bosnia and Herzegovina) D Džumhur	6^{2}	2
(Portugal) J Sousa	7^{7}	6
2	(Russia) K Khachanov	6^{2}	4

Quarterfinals
8	(Norway) C Ruud	6	5	3
4	(Croatia) B Ćorić	3	7	6
6	(Kazakhstan) M Kukushkin	6^{8}	2
(Portugal) J Sousa	7^{10}	6

Semifinals
4	(Croatia) B Ćorić	3	7^{7}	6
(Portugal) J Sousa	6	6^{5}	1

== Qualifying ==
=== Seeds ===
1. (Bosnia and Herzegovina) Damir Džumhur (qualifying competition, lucky loser)
2. (Belarus) Egor Gerasimov (qualified)
3. (Latvia) Ernests Gulbis (qualifying competition)
4. (Belarus) Ilya Ivashka (qualified)
5. (Czech Republic) Lukáš Rosol (qualified)
6. (Serbia) Viktor Troicki (withdrew)
7. (Russia) Alexey Vatutin (qualified)
8. (Italy) Matteo Viola (qualifying competition, lucky loser)

=== Qualifiers ===
1. (Czech Republic) Lukáš Rosol
2. (Belarus) Egor Gerasimov
3. (Russia) Alexey Vatutin
4. (Belarus) Ilya Ivashka

=== Lucky losers ===
1. (Bosnia and Herzegovina) Damir Džumhur
2. (Italy) Matteo Viola

=== Qualifying draw ===
==== First qualifier ====
First round
1	(Bosnia and Herzegovina) Damir Džumhur	6	7^{7}
Alt	(Russia) Aslan Karatsev	3	6^{5}
(Russia) Evgeny Karlovskiy	4	6	4
5	(Czech Republic) Lukáš Rosol	6	3	6

Qualifying competition
1	(Bosnia and Herzegovina) Damir Džumhur	6	6^{8}	4
5	(Czech Republic) Lukáš Rosol	4	7^{10}	6

==== Second qualifier ====
First round
2	(Belarus) Egor Gerasimov	6	6
(Chile) Alejandro Tabilo	0	4
(Russia) Roman Safiullin	6	6
Alt	(Russia) Konstantin Kravchuk	4	1

Qualifying competition
2	(Belarus) Egor Gerasimov	7	6^{4}	6
(Russia) Roman Safiullin	5	7^{7}	4

==== Third qualifier ====
First round
3	(Latvia) Ernests Gulbis	6	6
PR	(Israel) Amir Weintraub	1	0
(Kazakhstan) Aleksandr Nedovyesov	6	3	5
7	(Russia) Alexey Vatutin	1	6	7

Qualifying competition
3	(Latvia) Ernests Gulbis	6	3	2
7	(Russia) Alexey Vatutin	3	6	6

==== Fourth qualifier ====
First round
4	(Belarus) Ilya Ivashka	6	6
WC	(Russia) Evgenii Tiurnev	1	2
WC	(Russia) Alexander Vasilenko	2	7	2
8	(Italy) Matteo Viola	6	5	6

Qualifying competition
4	(Belarus) Ilya Ivashka	6	6
8	(Italy) Matteo Viola	4	2
