= Daniil Golubev =

Russian tennis player

Daniil Andreyevich Golubev
- Country (sports): Russia
- Residence: Saint-Petersburg, Russia
- Born: 20 September 2001 (age 25) Saint-Petersburg, Russia
- Height: 1.96 m (6 ft 5 in)
- Plays: Right-handed
- Prize money: $36,069

Singles
- Career record: 0–0 (at ATP Tour level, Grand Slam level, and in Davis Cup)
- Career titles: 0
- Highest ranking: No. 1827 (1 December 2025)
- Current ranking: No. 1910 (3 August 2026)

Doubles
- Career record: 0–4 (at ATP Tour level, Grand Slam level, and in Davis Cup)
- Career titles: 0 (4 ITF)
- Highest ranking: No. 396 (3 November 2025)
- Current ranking: No. 718 (3 August 2026)
- Last updated on: 3 August 2026.

Daniil Andreyevich Golubev (born 20 September 2001) is a Russian tennis player.

== Career ==
Golubev made his ATP main draw debut at the 2020 St. Petersburg Open after receiving a wildcard for the doubles main draw with Evgenii Tiurnev and advanced to the quarterfinals after lucky losers James Duckworth and Ilya Ivashka withdrew.

He received a wildcard for the 2023 Astana Open partnering Alexander Bublik.
