= 2018 St. Petersburg Open – Doubles =

Doubles
- 2018 St. Petersburg Open

Final
- Champions: (Italy) Matteo Berrettini (Italy) Fabio Fognini
- Runners-up: (Czech Republic) Roman Jebavý (Netherlands) Matwé Middelkoop
- Score: 7–6^{(8–6)}, 7–6^{(7–4)}

Events
Singles	Doubles
- St. Petersburg Open

Roman Jebavý and Matwé Middelkoop were the defending champions, but lost in the final to Matteo Berrettini and Fabio Fognini, 6–7^{(6–8)}, 6–7^{(4–7)}.

== Seeds ==
1. (United Kingdom) Dominic Inglot / (Croatia) Franko Škugor (first round)
2. (Chile) Julio Peralta / (Argentina) Horacio Zeballos (semifinals)
3. (Czech Republic) Roman Jebavý / (Netherlands) Matwé Middelkoop (final)
4. (Sweden) Robert Lindstedt / (United States) Rajeev Ram (first round)

== Draw ==
Key

- Q = Qualifier
- WC = Wild card
- LL = Lucky loser
- Alt = Alternate
- ITF = ITF entry
- PR = Protected ranking
- SR = Special ranking
- SE = Special exempt
- JE = Junior exempt
- JR = Junior Accelerator Programme entrant
- CO = College Accelerator Programme entrant
- NG = Next Gen Accelerator Program entrant
- w/o = Walkover
- r = Retired
- d = Defaulted

First round
1	(United Kingdom) D Inglot (Croatia) F Škugor	6^{5}	6^{5}
(India) L Paes (Mexico) MÁ Reyes-Varela	7^{7}	7^{7}
(Italy) M Berrettini (Italy) F Fognini	2	6	[10]
(Russia) A Rublev (Canada) D Shapovalov	6	2	[5]
4	(Sweden) R Lindstedt (United States) R Ram	3	6	[6]
(Russia) E Donskoy (Russia) K Khachanov	6	1	[10]
(Belarus) M Mirnyi (Austria) P Oswald	6	7^{7}
(Bosnia and Herzegovina) M Bašić (Bosnia and Herzegovina) D Džumhur	3	6^{1}
PR	(Germany) P Petzschner (Germany) T Pütz	6	6
(Italy) D Bracciali (Italy) M Cecchinato	2	0
(Poland) M Matkowski (United States) N Monroe	4	4
3	(Czech Republic) R Jebavý (Netherlands) M Middelkoop	6	6
WC	(Russia) M Elgin (Uzbekistan) D Istomin	6	6
WC	(Russia) T Gabashvili (Russia) E Karlovskiy	3	3
(Germany) A Begemann (Germany) J-L Struff	6	5	[8]
2	(Chile) J Peralta (Argentina) H Zeballos	4	7	[10]

Quarterfinals
(India) L Paes (Mexico) MÁ Reyes-Varela	6^{4}	3
(Italy) M Berrettini (Italy) F Fognini	7^{7}	6
(Russia) E Donskoy (Russia) K Khachanov	6^{2}	6^{1}
(Belarus) M Mirnyi (Austria) P Oswald	7^{7}	7^{7}
PR	(Germany) P Petzschner (Germany) T Pütz	1	4
3	(Czech Republic) R Jebavý (Netherlands) M Middelkoop	6	6
WC	(Russia) M Elgin (Uzbekistan) D Istomin
2	(Chile) J Peralta (Argentina) H Zeballos	w/o

Semifinals
(Italy) M Berrettini (Italy) F Fognini	7^{7}	6
(Belarus) M Mirnyi (Austria) P Oswald	6^{5}	3
3	(Czech Republic) R Jebavý (Netherlands) M Middelkoop	7^{7}	1	[10]
2	(Chile) J Peralta (Argentina) H Zeballos	6^{4}	6	[8]

Final
(Italy) M Berrettini (Italy) F Fognini	7^{8}	7^{7}
3	(Czech Republic) R Jebavý (Netherlands) M Middelkoop	6^{6}	6^{4}
