= St. Petersburg Open =

Coordinates: 59.869°N 30.342°E

Defunct tennis tournament
- Founded: 1995; 31 years ago
- Abolished: 2021
- Location: Saint Petersburg; Russia
- Venue: Petersburg Sports and Concert Complex (1995–2013); Sibur Arena (2015–2021)
- Category: ATP World Series / ATP International Series / ATP World Tour 250 series (1995–2019, 2021); ATP Tour 500 (2020)
- Surface: Carpet / indoor (1995–99/2004–07); Hard / indoor (2000–03/2008–2021)
- Draw: 28S/16Q/16D
- Prize money: $932,370 (2021)
- Website: spbopen.ru

The St. Petersburg Open (Russian: Открытый Санкт-Петербург) was a professional men's tennis tournament played on indoor hard courts. It was part of the ATP Tour 250 series of the Association of Tennis Professionals (ATP) Tour. The tournament was held annually at the Petersburg Sports and Concert Complex in Saint Petersburg, Russia, since 1995. The tournament takes place in mid to late September, following the conclusion of the US Open. The singles competition features 28 male competitors, while the doubles one features 16 duo teams. The competition has a total prize money pool of $1,180,000 USD.

2002 Australian Open champion Thomas Johansson and former World No. 1s Marat Safin and Andy Murray are the only players to have won the singles titles more than once. Five Russian players have won the singles title: Yevgeny Kafelnikov in 1995, Marat Safin in 2000 and 2001, Mikhail Youzhny in 2004, Daniil Medvedev in 2019, and Andrey Rublev in 2020. The event was not held in 2014 but resumed in 2015, at the Sibur Arena. The event was exceptionally held as an ATP 500 tournament in the 2020 edition.

In reaction to the 2022 Russian invasion of Ukraine, the ATP moved the 2022 St. Petersburg Open from Saint Petersburg to Kazakhstan.

== Past finals ==
=== Singles ===
Year	Champion	Runner-up	Score
↓ ATP Tour 250 (Note: Known as World Series from 1990 till 1999 and International Series from 2000 till 2008.) ↓
1995	(Russia) Yevgeny Kafelnikov	(France) Guillaume Raoux	6–2, 6–2
1996	(Sweden) Magnus Gustafsson	(Russia) Yevgeny Kafelnikov	6–2, 7–6^{(7–4)}
1997	(Sweden) Thomas Johansson	(Italy) Renzo Furlan	6–3, 6–4
1998	(Netherlands) Richard Krajicek	(Switzerland) Marc Rosset	6–4, 7–6^{(7–5)}
1999	(Switzerland) Marc Rosset	(Germany) David Prinosil	6–3, 6–4
2000	(Russia) Marat Safin	(Slovakia) Dominik Hrbatý	2–6, 6–4, 6–4
2001	(Russia) Marat Safin (2)	(Germany) Rainer Schüttler	3–6, 6–3, 6–3
2002	(France) Sébastien Grosjean	(Russia) Mikhail Youzhny	7–5, 6–4
2003	(Brazil) Gustavo Kuerten	(Armenia) Sargis Sargsian	6–4, 6–3
2004	(Russia) Mikhail Youzhny	(Slovakia) Karol Beck	6–2, 6–2
2005	(Sweden) Thomas Johansson (2)	(Germany) Nicolas Kiefer	6–4, 6–2
2006	(Croatia) Mario Ančić	(Sweden) Thomas Johansson	7–5, 7–6^{(7–2)}
2007	(United Kingdom) Andy Murray	(Spain) Fernando Verdasco	6–2, 6–3
2008	(United Kingdom) Andy Murray (2)	(Kazakhstan) Andrey Golubev	6–1, 6–1
2009	(Ukraine) Sergiy Stakhovsky	(Argentina) Horacio Zeballos	2–6, 7–6^{(10–8)}, 7–6^{(9–7)}
2010	(Kazakhstan) Mikhail Kukushkin	(Russia) Mikhail Youzhny	6–3, 7–6^{(7–2)}
2011	(Croatia) Marin Čilić	(Serbia) Janko Tipsarević	6–3, 3–6, 6–2
2012	(Slovakia) Martin Kližan	(Italy) Fabio Fognini	6–2, 6–3
2013	(Latvia) Ernests Gulbis	(Spain) Guillermo García-López	3–6, 6–4, 6–0
2014	Not held		
2015	(Canada) Milos Raonic	(Portugal) João Sousa	6–3, 3–6, 6–3
2016	(Germany) Alexander Zverev	(Switzerland) Stan Wawrinka	6–2, 3–6, 7–5
2017	(Bosnia and Herzegovina) Damir Džumhur	(Italy) Fabio Fognini	3–6, 6–4, 6–2
2018	(Austria) Dominic Thiem	(Slovakia) Martin Kližan	6–3, 6–1
2019	(Russia) Daniil Medvedev	(Croatia) Borna Ćorić	6–3, 6–1
↓ ATP Tour 500 ↓
2020	(Russia) Andrey Rublev	(Croatia) Borna Ćorić	7–6^{(7–5)}, 6–4
↓ ATP Tour 250 ↓
2021	(Croatia) Marin Čilić (2)	(United States) Taylor Fritz	7–6^{(7–3)}, 4–6, 6–4
2022– 2025	Not held due to the Russian invasion of Ukraine		

=== Doubles ===
Year	Champions	Runners-up	Score
↓ ATP Tour 250 ↓
1995	(Czech Republic) Martin Damm (Sweden) Anders Järryd	(Switzerland) Jakob Hlasek (Russia) Yevgeny Kafelnikov	6–4, 6–2
1996	(Russia) Yevgeny Kafelnikov (Russia) Andrei Olhovskiy	(Sweden) Nicklas Kulti (Sweden) Peter Nyborg	6–3, 6–4
1997	(Russia) Andrei Olhovskiy (2) (New Zealand) Brett Steven	(Germany) David Prinosil (Czech Republic) Daniel Vacek	6–4, 6–3
1998	(Sweden) Nicklas Kulti (Sweden) Mikael Tillström	(South Africa) Marius Barnard (South Africa) Brent Haygarth	3–6, 6–3, 7–6
1999	(United States) Jeff Tarango (Czech Republic) Daniel Vacek	(Netherlands) Menno Oosting (Romania) Andrei Pavel	3–6, 6–3, 7–5
2000	(Canada) Daniel Nestor (Zimbabwe) Kevin Ullyett	(Japan) Thomas Shimada (South Africa) Myles Wakefield	7–6^{(7–5)}, 7–5
2001	(Russia) Denis Golovanov (Russia) Yevgeny Kafelnikov (2)	(Georgia (country)) Irakli Labadze (Russia) Marat Safin	7–5, 6–4
2002	(South Africa) David Adams (United States) Jared Palmer	(Georgia (country)) Irakli Labadze (Russia) Marat Safin	7–6^{(10–8)}, 6–3
2003	(Austria) Julian Knowle (Serbia and Montenegro) Nenad Zimonjić	(Germany) Michael Kohlmann (Germany) Rainer Schüttler	7–6^{(7–1)}, 6–3
2004	(France) Arnaud Clément (France) Michaël Llodra	(Slovakia) Dominik Hrbatý (Czech Republic) Jaroslav Levinský	6–3, 6–2
2005	(Austria) Julian Knowle (Austria) Jürgen Melzer	(Sweden) Jonas Björkman (Belarus) Max Mirnyi	4–6, 7–5, 7–5
2006	(Sweden) Simon Aspelin (Australia) Todd Perry	(Austria) Julian Knowle (Austria) Jürgen Melzer	6–1, 7–6^{(7–3)}
2007	(Canada) Daniel Nestor (2) (Serbia) Nenad Zimonjić (2)	(Austria) Jürgen Melzer (Australia) Todd Perry	6–1, 7–6^{(7–3)}
2008	(United States) Travis Parrott (Slovakia) Filip Polášek	(India) Rohan Bopanna (Belarus) Max Mirnyi	3–6, 7–6^{(4–7)}, [10–8]
2009	(United Kingdom) Colin Fleming (United Kingdom) Ken Skupski	(France) Jérémy Chardy (France) Richard Gasquet	2–6, 7–5, [10–4]
2010	(Italy) Daniele Bracciali (Italy) Potito Starace	(India) Rohan Bopanna (Pakistan) Aisam-ul-Haq Qureshi	7–6^{(8–6)}, 7–6^{(7–5)}
2011	(United Kingdom) Colin Fleming (2) (United Kingdom) Ross Hutchins	(Russia) Michail Elgin (Russia) Alexandre Kudryavtsev	6–3, 6–7^{(5–7)}, [10–8]
2012	(United States) Rajeev Ram (Serbia) Nenad Zimonjić (3)	(Slovakia) Lukáš Lacko (Slovakia) Igor Zelenay	6–2, 4–6, [10-6]
2013	(Spain) David Marrero (Spain) Fernando Verdasco	(United Kingdom) Dominic Inglot (Uzbekistan) Denis Istomin	7–6^{(8–6)}, 6–3
2014	Not held		
2015	(Philippines) Treat Huey (Finland) Henri Kontinen	(Austria) Julian Knowle (Austria) Alexander Peya	7–5, 6–3
2016	(United Kingdom) Dominic Inglot (Finland) Henri Kontinen (2)	(Germany) Andre Begemann (India) Leander Paes	4–6, 6–3, [12–10]
2017	(Czech Republic) Roman Jebavý (Netherlands) Matwé Middelkoop	(Chile) Julio Peralta (Argentina) Horacio Zeballos	6–4, 6–4
2018	(Italy) Matteo Berrettini (Italy) Fabio Fognini	(Czech Republic) Roman Jebavý (Netherlands) Matwé Middelkoop	7–6^{(8–6)}, 7–6^{(7–4)}
2019	(India) Divij Sharan (Slovakia) Igor Zelenay	(Italy) Matteo Berrettini (Italy) Simone Bolelli	6–3, 3–6, [10–8]
↓ ATP Tour 500 ↓
2020	(Austria) Jürgen Melzer (2) (France) Édouard Roger-Vasselin	(Brazil) Marcelo Demoliner (Netherlands) Matwé Middelkoop	6–2, 7–6^{(7–4)}
↓ ATP Tour 250 ↓
2021	(United Kingdom) Jamie Murray (Brazil) Bruno Soares	(Kazakhstan) Andrey Golubev (Monaco) Hugo Nys	6–3, 6–4
2022– 2025	Not held due to the Russian invasion of Ukraine		
