= Borna Ćorić =

Croatian tennis player (born 1996)

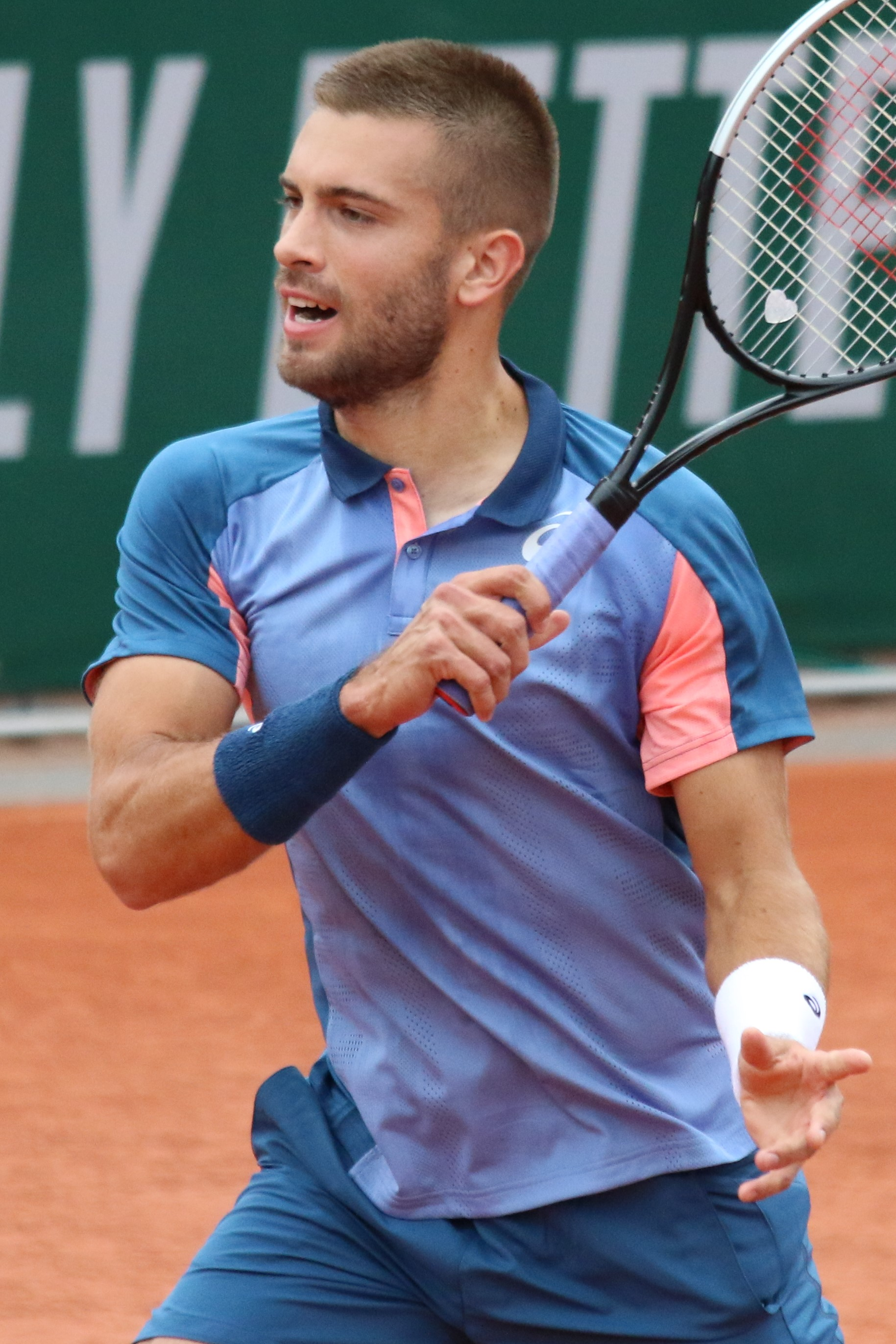
- Ćorić at the 2022 French Open
- Country (sports): Croatia
- Residence: Dubai, United Arab Emirates
- Born: 14 November 1996 (age 30) Zagreb, Croatia
- Height: 1.88 m (6 ft 2 in)
- Turned pro: 2013
- Plays: Right-handed (two-handed backhand)
- Coach: Franko Škugor
- Prize money: US $13,515,306

Singles
- Career record: 223–202
- Career titles: 3
- Highest ranking: No. 12 (5 November 2018)
- Current ranking: No. 1,204 (31 August 2026)

Grand Slam singles results
- Australian Open: 4R (2019)
- French Open: 3R (2015, 2016, 2018, 2019, 2023)
- Wimbledon: 2R (2015, 2024)
- US Open: QF (2020)

Doubles
- Career record: 4–16
- Career titles: 0
- Highest ranking: No. 413 (7 November 2016)

Team competitions
- Davis Cup: W (2018)
- Hopman Cup: W (2023)
- Last updated on: 1 September 2026.

Borna Ćorić (Croatian pronunciation: [bôːrna tɕǒːritɕ]; born 14 November 1996) is a Croatian inactive professional tennis player. He reached a career-high singles ranking of world No. 12 in November 2018. Coric has won three ATP Tour titles, including the 2022 Cincinnati Masters.

== Junior career ==
In 2013, Ćorić reached the semifinals of both the Australian and French Open junior events, before going on to win the boys' singles event at the US Open against Australian Thanasi Kokkinakis in three sets. As a result, Ćorić moved to No. 1 in the junior rankings. That year, he also began playing on the ITF Futures circuit, winning five singles titles.

== Professional career ==
=== 2013: First best-of-5 match ===
Ćorić made his debut at the 2013 Davis Cup, after he was selected for Croatia's World Group Play-off tie against Great Britain, with his first best-of-5 sets match coming against world number 3, Andy Murray. Despite showing promise, matching the Scot's level in the first 6 games, and breaking his serve in the third set, he would ultimately go on to lose in straight sets.

=== 2014: ATP Star of Tomorrow ===
In April, Ćorić defeated No. 21 Jerzy Janowicz on the first day of the Davis Cup tie between Croatia and Poland.

In July, in the first round of the clay court event in Umag where he was playing with a wildcard, Ćorić scored another notable win over a top-50 player, beating seventh seed, No. 46 Édouard Roger-Vasselin in straight sets. He beat qualifier Horacio Zeballos in the second round to reach his first ATP quarterfinal. In the quarterfinal, he faced second seed Fabio Fognini and lost in three sets. Ćorić entered the top 200 for the first time on 28 July after his run in Umag, at No. 194.

In August, Ćorić qualified for the main draw of the 2014 US Open, his first appearance in the main draw of a Grand Slam. He upset 29th seed Lukáš Rosol in the first round in straight sets, before falling to Víctor Estrella Burgos in the second round.

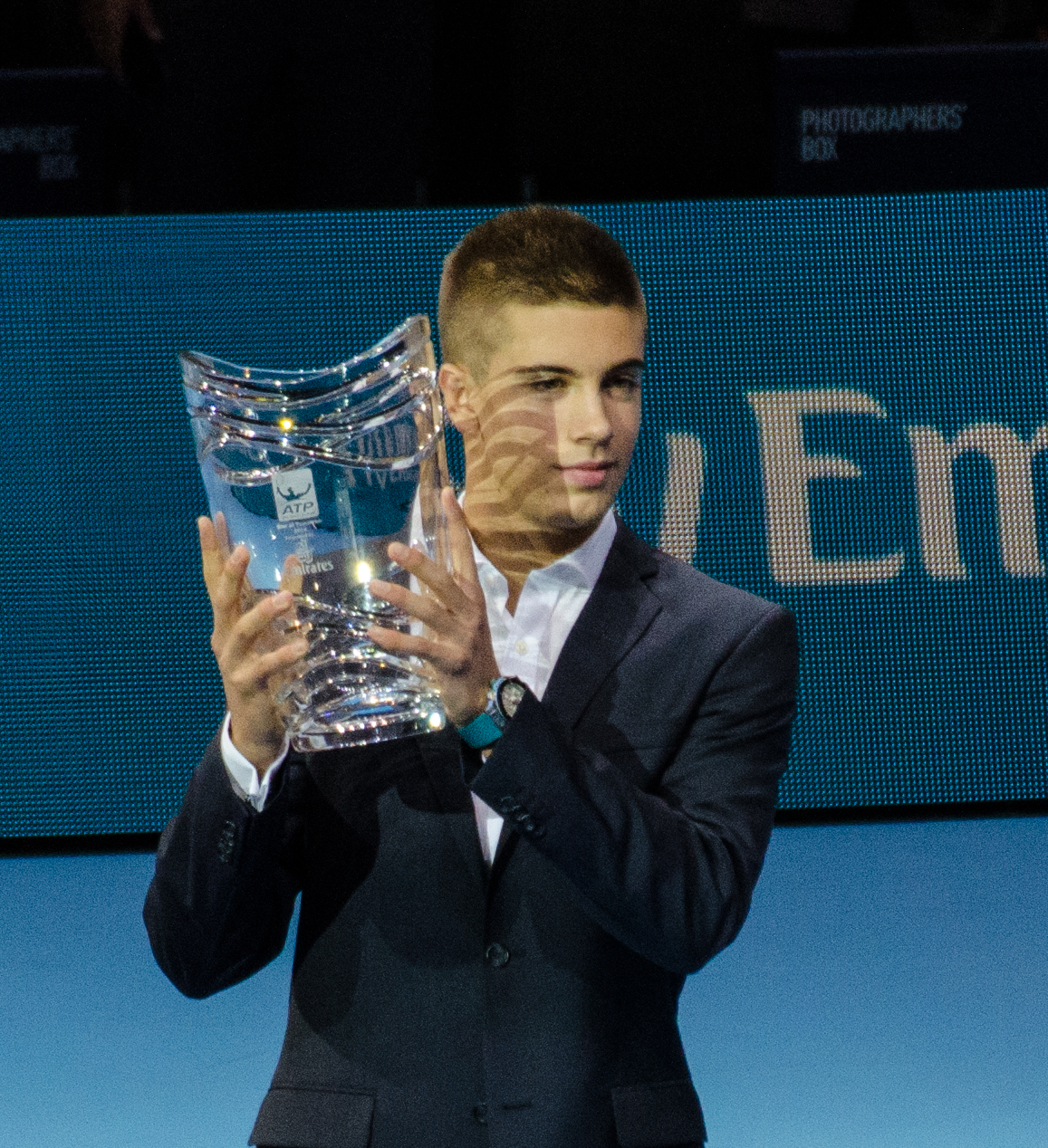
Ćorić receiving the 2014 ATP Star of Tomorrow Award at the O2 in London

On 21 September, Ćorić won his first ATP Challenger title in İzmir, and he entered the top 150 for the first time at the age of 17 and 10 months, at No. 140.

In October, he was given a wildcard for the Swiss Indoors, where he achieved his first victory over a top-20 player, No. 13 Ernests Gulbis, in straight sets. In the quarterfinals he went on to record the biggest victory of his young career, defeating world No. 3, Rafael Nadal. His run to the semifinals launched him into the world's top 100 for the first time (at No. 93), making him the youngest player to do so since Nadal in 2003. In the semifinal, he lost to future top ten player David Goffin, in three sets.

In November, Ćorić won the ATP Star of Tomorrow, awarded by the ATP Awards, for being the youngest player in the top 100.

=== 2015: Top-50 player ===
At the 2015 Australian Open, Ćorić received his first direct entry into the main draw of a Grand Slam tournament. He faced 29th seed Jérémy Chardy in the first round and lost in four sets.

In February, Ćorić made the second ATP 500 semifinal of his career in Dubai, defeating world No. 3, Andy Murray, in straight sets in the quarterfinals, his second win over a top-5 player; although he entered the main draw as a lucky loser. In the semifinals, he lost to world No. 2, Roger Federer, in straight sets. In March, Ćorić made his ATP Masters 1000 main-draw debut in Indian Wells, reaching the second round.

At the French Open, Ćorić reached the third round in a Grand Slam for the first time, after defeating Sam Querrey and 18th seed Tommy Robredo, before falling to Jack Sock.

Ćorić achieved his first grass-court win by defeating Donald Young in the first round in Halle, before losing to Tomáš Berdych in the second round. At Wimbledon, he defeated Sergiy Stakhovsky in the first round, then lost to 25th seed Andreas Seppi in the second in five sets.

In August, Ćorić climbed to a then career-high of No. 33 in the ATP rankings. After defeating one of his junior rivals, and future top-3 player Alexander Zverev, he lost to Stan Wawrinka in three close sets in the second round in Cincinnati. The Winston-Salem Open saw the first time that Ćorić attended an ATP tournament as a seeded player, where he reached the quarterfinals and lost to eventual champion Kevin Anderson. At the US Open, he lost in the first round to 8th seed Rafael Nadal in four sets.

In September, after winning another ATP Challenger title, Ćorić achieved two singles wins for Croatia in the 2015 Davis Cup World Group Play-off tie against Brazil. He ended his 2015 season at No. 44.

=== 2016: First ATP finals and knee surgery ===
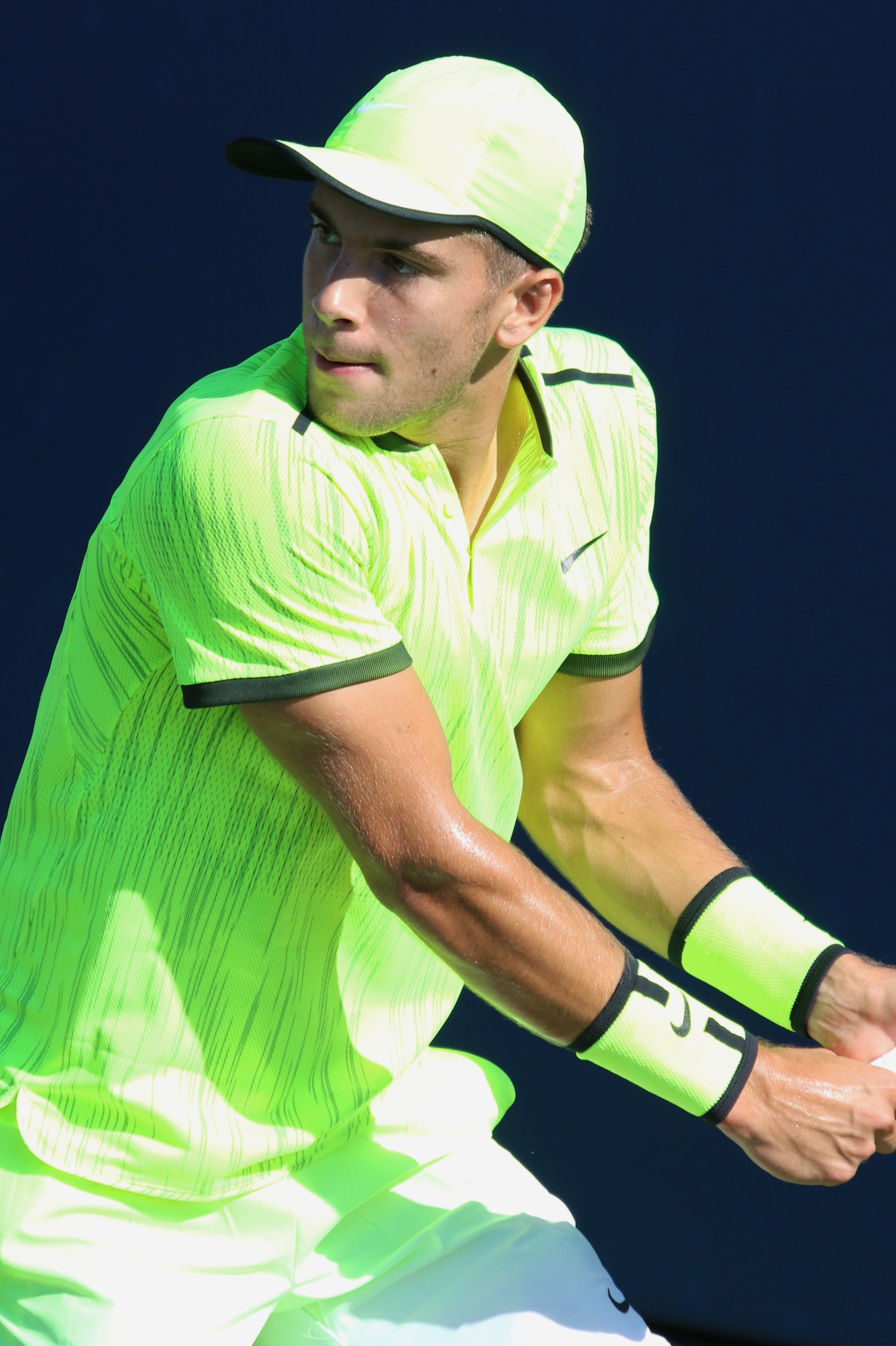
Ćorić at the 2016 US Open

In January, Ćorić was named in Forbes' "30 Under 30" sports list for 2016. That same month, as the eighth seed at the Aircel Chennai Open, he reached his first ATP final but was defeated by top seed, Stan Wawrinka, in straight sets. In Sydney, he lost in the first round to Gilles Müller. Ranked No. 40 at the Australian Open, he was ousted from the tournament in the first round by Albert Ramos Viñolas.

Seeded seventh at the Open Sud de France, Ćorić was beaten in the first round by Michael Berrer. At the Rotterdam Open, he lost in the second round to fifth seed and eventual finalist, Gaël Monfils. In Dubai, he was defeated in the second round by eighth seed Philipp Kohlschreiber. Playing for Croatia in the Davis Cup tie against Belgium, Ćorić lost in a five-setter to David Goffin, but he won the deciding rubber by defeating Kimmer Coppejans to help Croatia to move on into the last eight. Competing at the Indian Wells Masters, he upset 29th seed, Thomaz Bellucci, in the second round. He was beaten in the third round by sixth seed Tomáš Berdych. In Miami, he fell in the first round to Denis Istomin.

Ćorić started his clay-court season in April at the Grand Prix Hassan II in Marrakesh. Seeded third, he reached his second ATP final and lost to fourth seed, Federico Delbonis, in straight sets. At the Monte-Carlo Masters, he was defeated in the first round by Philipp Kohlschreiber. Seeded sixth at the Estoril Open, he made it to the quarterfinals where he was eliminated by second seed Nick Kyrgios. In Madrid, he was ousted from the tournament in the second round by World No. 1, 2011 champion, and eventual champion, Novak Djokovic. At the Italian Open, he was beaten in the first round by qualifier Mikhail Kukushkin. At the French Open, he upset 20th seed, Bernard Tomic, in the second round. He lost in the third round to 14th seed Roberto Bautista Agut.

At the Gerry Weber Open in Halle, Ćorić's first grass-court tournament of the season, he was defeated in the first round by fifth seed, David Goffin, in a tight three-set match.

In July, Ćorić repeated his feat from earlier in the year by winning the decisive rubber in Croatia's Davis Cup quarterfinal tie against the United States, defeating Jack Sock to send Croatia to their first Davis Cup semifinal since 2009.

At the Cincinnati Masters, Ćorić scored his third career victory over a top-10 player when he defeated former number one player, Rafael Nadal, in straight sets. It was his second career win over the Spaniard, both of which he achieved while still a teenager. Ćorić reached his first ATP Masters 1000 quarterfinal at the Cincinnati Masters but was forced to retire when facing the eventual champion, Marin Čilić, in the quarterfinal match due to a knee injury, marking the first time that Ćorić retired during a match in his career.

In September, Ćorić lost to Richard Gasquet in the Davis Cup semifinal between France and Croatia, and then announced he would undergo season-ending knee surgery.

=== 2017: First ATP title ===
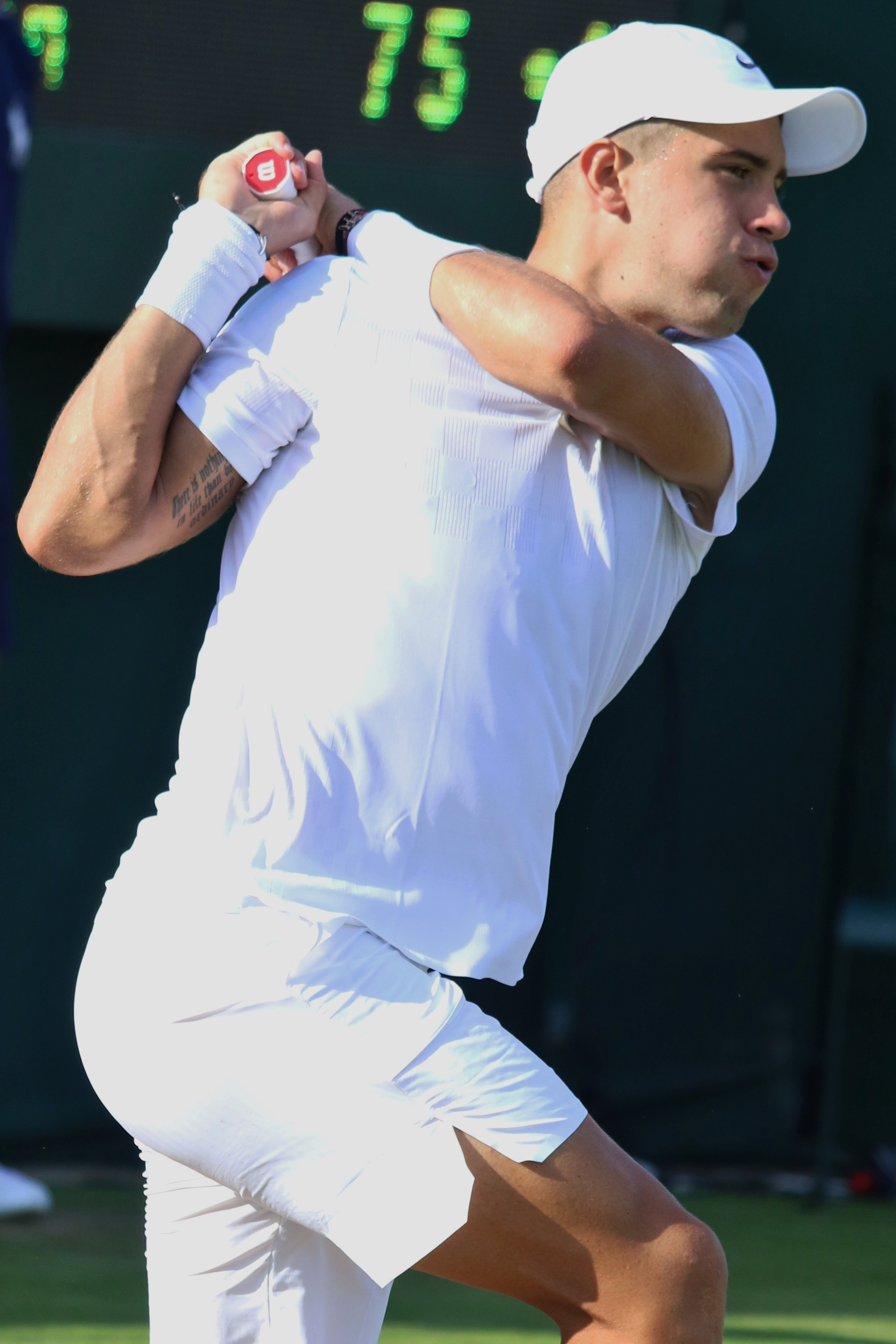
Ćorić at the 2017 Wimbledon Championships

Ćorić started his 2017 season at the Chennai Open. Seeded sixth, he lost in the first round to South Korean qualifier Chung Hyeon. Ranked No. 59 at the Australian Open, he was defeated in the first round by Alexandr Dolgopolov in four sets.

In February, Ćorić competed at the Open Sud de France. He fell in the first round to Aljaž Bedene. At the Rotterdam Open, he was eliminated in the second round by top seed and world No. 7, Marin Čilić. In Delray Beach, he was beaten in the second round by top seed and world No. 4, Milos Raonic. At the Mexican Open in Acapulco, he lost in the second round to third seed and world No. 8, Marin Čilić. During the week of March 6, he played at the Indian Wells Masters. He was defeated in the first round by qualifier Henri Laaksonen. Seeded fifth at the Irving Classic, he lost his second-round match to Dustin Brown. In Miami, he upset sixth seed and world No. 8, Dominic Thiem, in the second round. He fell in the third round to Adrian Mannarino.

Ćorić started his clay-court season at the Grand Prix Hassan II in Marrakesh, Morocco. As last year's finalist, he won his first ATP title beating third seed, Philipp Kohlschreiber, in the final in three sets. He stormed back from a break down in both the second and third sets, and he also had to save a total of five championship points. At the Monte-Carlo Masters, he lost in the first round to Jérémy Chardy. At the first edition of the Hungarian Open, he was defeated in the first round by Jiří Veselý. Seeded seventh in Istanbul, he was ousted from the tournament in the first round by Dušan Lajović.

At the Madrid Open, he lost in the final round of qualifying to Mikhail Kukushkin. However, due to the withdrawal of Richard Gasquet, he earned a lucky loser spot in the main draw. He defeated Mischa Zverev and qualifier Pierre-Hugues Herbert to reach the third round. On May 12, he stunned world No. 1, Andy Murray to reach his first Masters quarterfinal on clay. This was his first victory over a world No. 1 player. He ended up losing in the quarterfinals to eighth seed, world No. 9, and eventual finalist, Dominic Thiem. Seeded seventh at the first edition of the Lyon Open, he was beaten in the first round by Nikoloz Basilashvili. Ranked No. 40 at the French Open, he lost in the second round to 25th seed and world No. 26, Steve Johnson, in four sets.

Ćorić played only one tournament in preparation for Wimbledon. Seeded seventh at the first edition of the Antalya Open, he lost in the first round to eventual finalist Adrian Mannarino. Ranked 45 at Wimbledon, he was defeated in the first round by American Ryan Harrison.

Ćorić began his US Open series at the Rogers Cup. Here, he lost in the second round to top seed and world No. 2, Rafael Nadal. In Cincinnati, he was defeated in the first round by Nikoloz Basilashvili. Seeded 14th at the Winston-Salem Open, he upset 3rd seed, world No. 14, two-time champion, and big-serving American, John Isner, in the third round. He was eliminated in the quarterfinals by Jan-Lennard Struff. Ranked 61 at the US Open, he upset fourth seed and world No. 6, Alexander Zverev, in the second round. He subsequently lost to eventual finalist, Kevin Anderson, in the third round.

At the St. Petersburg Open, Ćorić lost in round one to eighth seed Jan-Lennard Struff. In Chengdu, he was defeated in the first round by Guido Pella. He fell in the final round of qualifying at the China Open to Marcel Granollers. At the Shanghai Masters, he was eliminated in the first round of qualifying by Henri Laaksonen. Competing at the Kremlin Cup, he was beaten in the first round by Dudi Sela. At the Swiss Indoors, he reached the second round where he lost to second seed, world No. 4, and defending champion, Marin Čilić, in three sets. Getting past qualifying at the Paris Masters, he was ousted from the tournament in the second round by third seed Marin Čilić. Ćorić qualified for the Next Generation ATP Finals after finishing in the top seven in the Race to Milan. He entered as the fourth seed and won his group through the round-robin stage, defeating Jared Donaldson, Daniil Medvedev, and Karen Khachanov. He was defeated by Andrey Rublev in the semifinals. In the third place match against Medvedev, Ćorić withdrew from the match due to injury.

Ćorić ended the year ranked 48.

=== 2018: Davis Cup champion and Top 15 ===
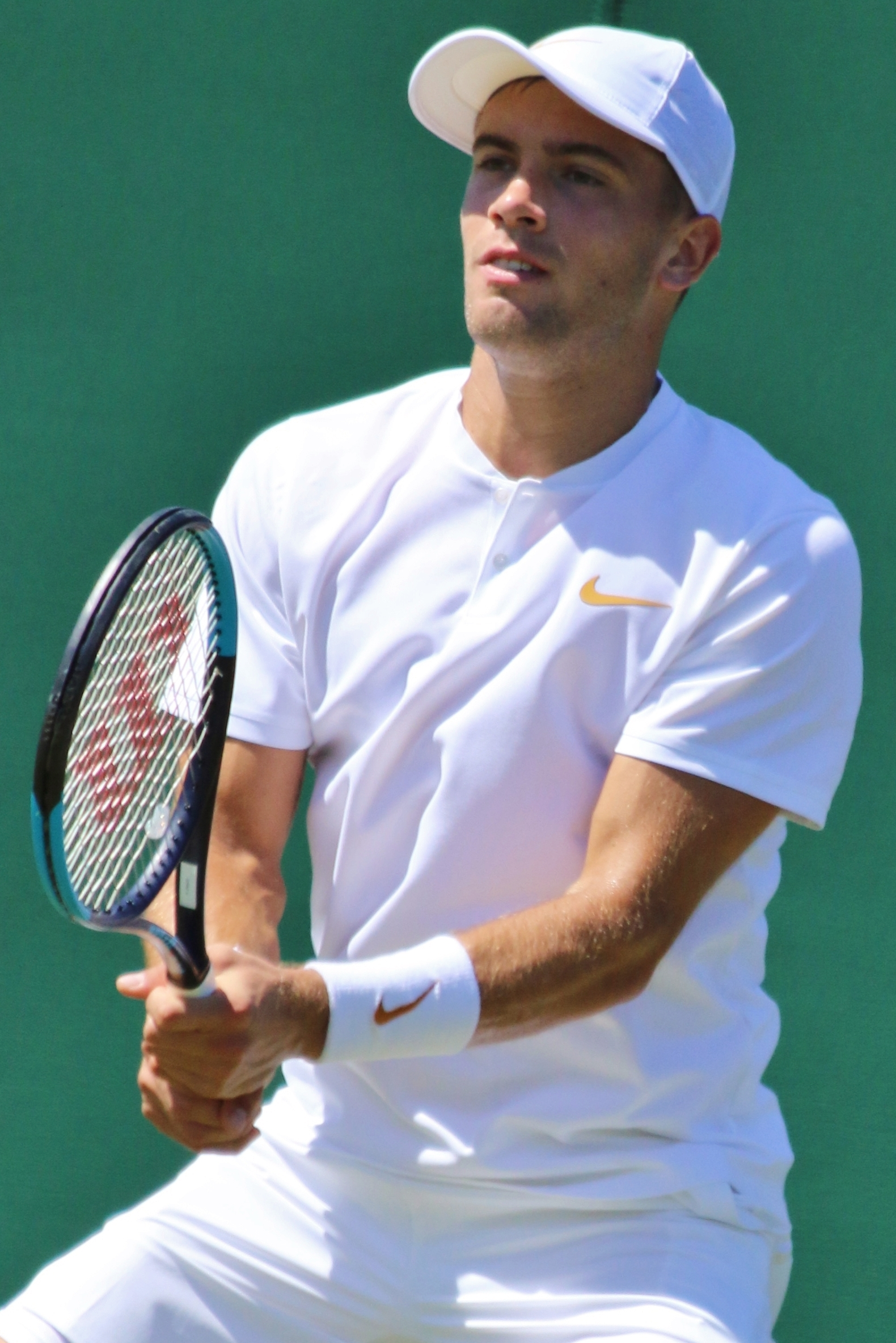
Ćorić at the 2018 Wimbledon Championships

Ćorić opened his 2018 season at the Qatar ExxonMobil Open. He ousted second seed, Pablo Carreño Busta, in the first round. He lost in the quarterfinals to eventual finalist Andrey Rublev. Ranked 46 at the Australian Open, he was defeated in the first round by Australian John Millman.

In February, Ćorić helped Croatia to advance to the Davis Cup quarterfinals by defeating Vasek Pospisil and rising star Denis Shapovalov. At the Dubai Championships, he upset fifth seed, Richard Gasquet, in the first round. He ended up losing in the quarterfinals to third seed, world No. 23, and eventual champion, Roberto Bautista Agut. Ćorić had a great run at the Indian Wells Masters. He beat 19th seed, Albert Ramos Viñolas, in the second round. He then got revenge on 13th seed, Roberto Bautista Agut, defeating him in the third round. In the quarterfinals, he stunned seventh seed and world No. 9, Kevin Anderson, to reach his first ATP Masters 1000 semifinal. He lost to world No. 1 and five-time champion, Roger Federer, in three tight sets, despite leading by a set and a break. He followed up his semifinal result at Indian Wells with another impressive performance in Miami. Seeded 29th, he made it to the quarterfinals where he bowed out to fourth seed, world No. 5, and eventual finalist, Alexander Zverev. In the Davis Cup quarterfinal tie against Kazakhstan, he lost to Mikhail Kukushkin. However, Croatia won the tie 3–1 to advance to the semifinals.

Starting his clay-court season at the Monte-Carlo Masters, Ćorić lost in the second round to ninth seed, world No. 13, and two-time champion, Novak Djokovic. Competing in Madrid, he reached the third round where he was defeated by fifth seed, world No. 7, last year finalist, and eventual finalist, Dominic Thiem. At the Italian Open, he retired during his first-round match against qualifier Stefanos Tsitsipas. Ranked 40 at the French Open, he beat 22nd seed and world No. 24, Philipp Kohlschreiber, in the first round. He was eliminated in the third round by 11th seed and world No. 12, Diego Schwartzman, in straight sets.

Ćorić started his grass-court season at the Gerry Weber Open in Halle, Germany. He upset second seed and world No. 3, Alexander Zverev, in the first round. He eventually made it to the final where he stunned world No. 1 and nine-time champion, Roger Federer, to win his second career ATP tour title and first on grass. In July, he broke into the top 20 of the ATP rankings for the first time. Seeded 16th at Wimbledon, he was beaten in the first round by Daniil Medvedev.

In August, Ćorić competed at the Swiss Open. Seeded third, he was ousted from the tournament in the second round by Laslo Đere. At the Rogers Cup in Toronto, he lost in the second round to sixth seed and world No. 7, Marin Čilić. Playing at the Western & Southern Open in Cincinnati, he was defeated in the second round by 15th seed and world No. 18, Nick Kyrgios. Seeded 20th at the US Open, he reached the fourth round of a Grand Slam for the first time in his career. He ended up losing to third seed, 2009 champion, and eventual finalist, Juan Martín del Potro. Later that month, Croatia hosted the United States for the Davis Cup semifinals. The teams split the first four matches, including a straight-sets victory for Ćorić over Steve Johnson. In the deciding rubber, Ćorić came back from two sets to one down to beat Frances Tiafoe and send Croatia into their second Davis Cup final in three years.

Seeded third at the Shenzhen Open, Ćorić was eliminated in the second round by Cam Norrie. Seeded seventh in Beijing, he fell in the first round to Feliciano López, despite having a 5–4 lead in the third set. Seeded 13th at the Shanghai Masters, he reached the final by beating third seed and world No. 4, Juan Martín del Potro, in the third round via retirement and upsetting top seed, world No. 2, and two-time champion, Roger Federer, in the semifinals. He fell to second seed and world No. 3, Novak Djokovic, in the championship match. His effort in reaching his maiden ATP Masters 1000 final propelled him to a career-high rank of No. 13 in the ATP rankings. Seeded sixth in Vienna, he retired during his quarterfinal match against second seed and world No. 8, Kevin Anderson, due to injury. Seeded 11th at the Paris Masters, he lost in the third round to 6th seed, Dominic Thiem. In November, Ćorić competed in the Davis Cup final against France. He helped Croatia win the title with a victory over Jérémy Chardy.

Ćorić ended the year ranked 12.

=== 2019: Fourth round at the Australian Open, back injury ===
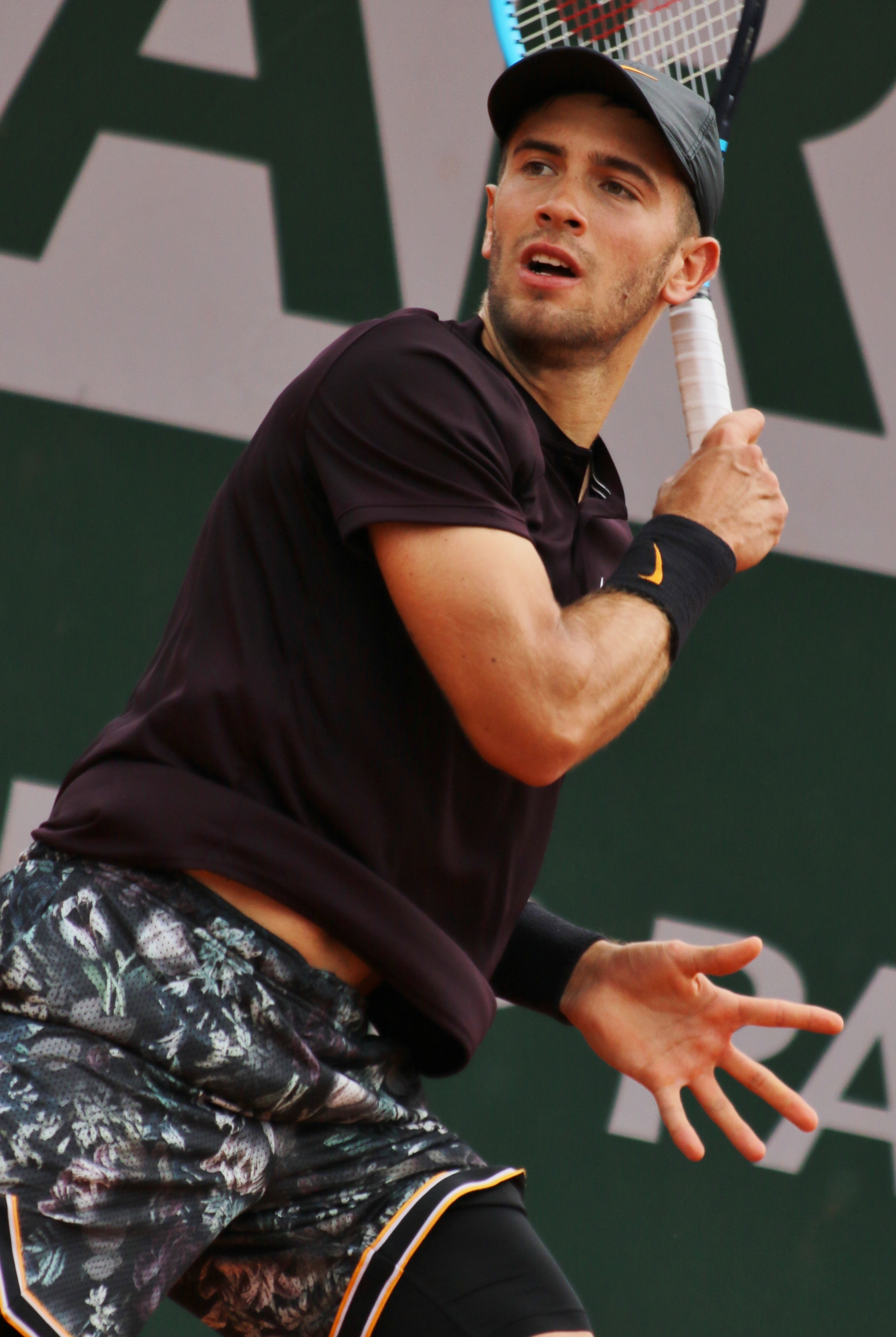
Ćorić at the 2019 French Open

Ćorić began his 2019 season at the Australian Open. Seeded 11th, he won his first-ever match at this tournament by beating Steve Darcis in the first round. He ended up reaching the fourth round where he lost to 28th seed and eventual semifinalist, Lucas Pouille. This marked the second time overall that Ćorić reached the last 16 of a major.

In February, Ćorić competed at the Open 13 in Marseille. Seeded second, he suffered a second-round exit at the hands of French wildcard Ugo Humbert. Seeded sixth at the Dubai Championships, he made it to the semifinals where he fell to second seed, world No. 7, and eventual champion, Roger Federer. Seeded 11th at the Indian Wells Masters, he was unable to match his semifinal result from last year because he lost in the second round to Ivo Karlović. Seeded 11th at the Miami Open, he reached the quarterfinals for the second consecutive year before losing to Canadian qualifier Félix Auger-Aliassime.

Ćorić started his clay-court season at the Monte-Carlo Masters. Seeded ninth, he made it to the quarterfinals where he was defeated by 13th seed and eventual champion, Fabio Fognini, in three sets. Seeded second in Budapest, he lost in his quarterfinals match to qualifier and eventual finalist, Filip Krajinović. Seeded 13th at the Madrid Open, he suffered a first-round loss at the hands of Lucas Pouille. Seeded 13th in Rome, he faced off in the third round against third seed, Roger Federer, for the fifth time in 14 months. The pair split the opening two sets and were deadlocked in the decider. Federer won the match in a tiebreak after Ćorić was unable to convert upon two match point opportunities. Seeded 13th at the French Open, his clay-court season ended with a hard-fought defeat in the third round to Jan-Lennard Struff.

Ćorić entered the grass-court season as Croatian number one for the first time in his career, after overtaking Marin Čilić in the ATP rankings. Seeded second in 's-Hertogenbosch, he reached his second semifinal of the year where he lost to eventual champion, Adrian Mannarino, in a third-set tiebreak. Seeded fourth and defending champion at the Halle Open, he overcame qualifier, João Sousa, in the second round in a grueling three-hour match. He retired down a set against Pierre-Hugues Herbert in the quarterfinals due to a back injury. Ćorić subsequently withdrew from Wimbledon.

Ćorić returned during the week of July 15. Seeded second at the Croatia Open, he was beaten in the second round by Italian qualifier Salvatore Caruso. Seeded 11th at the Rogers Cup in Montreal, he lost in the second round to Adrian Mannarino. Seeded 12th at the Western & Southern Open in Cincinnati, he was defeated in the first round by American wildcard, Reilly Opelka, in three sets. Seeded 12th at the US Open, he withdrew from his second-round match against Grigor Dimitrov citing a lower back strain.

Ćorić returned to competitive play at the St. Petersburg Open in September. Seeded fourth, he reached his first final of the year. He was defeated in the championship match by top seed, world No. 4, and US Open finalist, Daniil Medvedev, in straight sets. Seeded fourth at the first edition of the Zhuhai Championships, he made it to the quarterfinals losing to seventh seed and eventual champion, Alex de Minaur. Seeded second in Tokyo, he fell in the first round to Japanese wildcard Taro Daniel. Seeded 12th at the Shanghai Masters, he lost his first round match to Andrey Rublev. Seeded eighth at the Erste Bank Open in Vienna, he was defeated in the first round by Mikhail Kukushkin. Last year finalist at the Paris Masters, he lost in the first round to Fernando Verdasco.

Representing Croatia at the Davis Cup Finals in November, Croatia was drawn in Group B alongside Russia and Spain. Croatia lost its opening tie 0–3 against Russia, with Ćorić losing the second rubber in three sets against Karen Khachanov. He then pulled out of the tie against Spain citing exhaustion; Spain went on to win the tie 3–0, thus eliminating Croatia from the competition.

Ćorić ended the year ranked 28.

=== 2020: Continued struggles and US Open quarterfinals ===
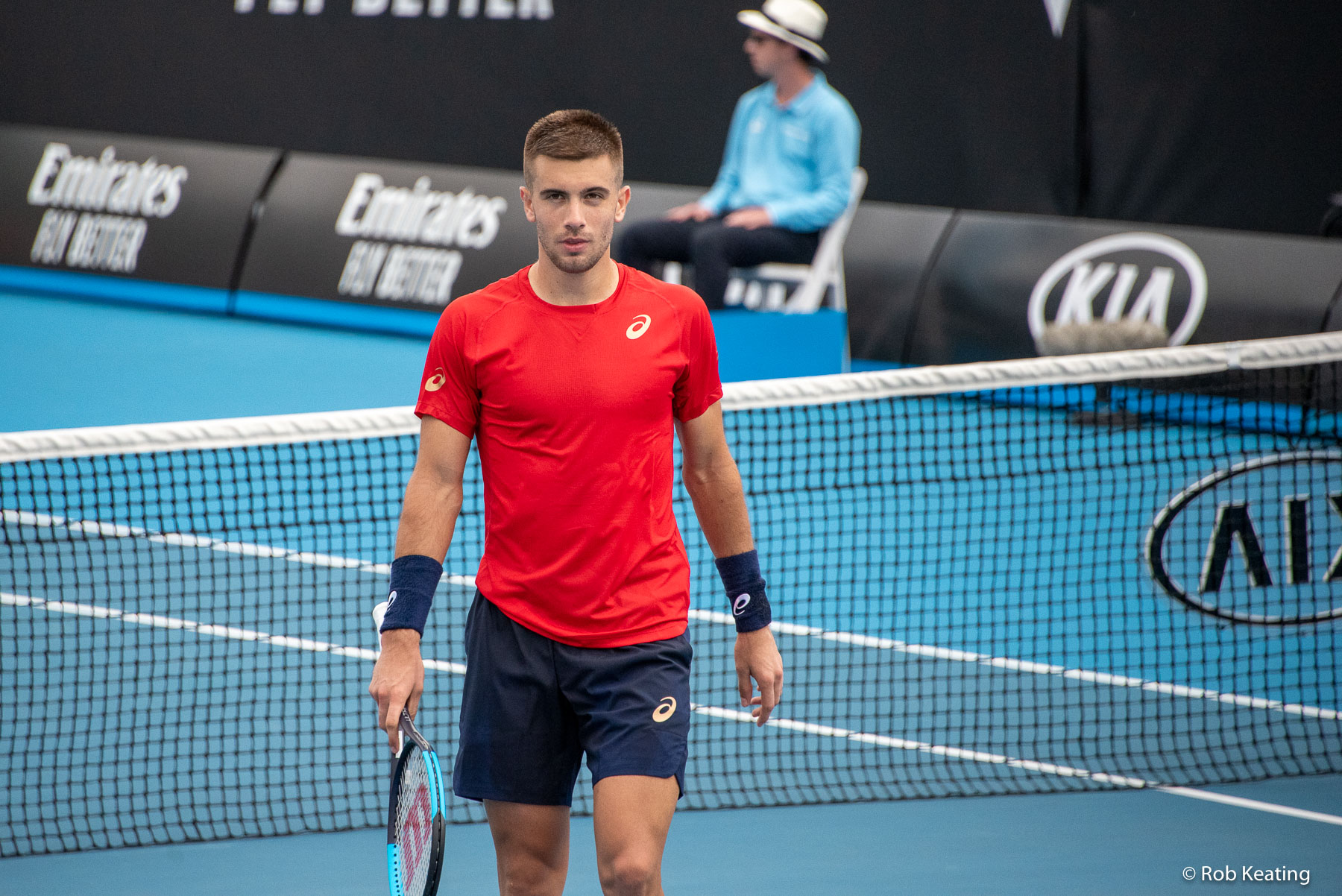
Ćorić at the 2020 Australian Open

Ćorić began his 2020 season at the first edition of the ATP Cup. Croatia was in Group E alongside Austria, Poland, and Argentina. He played three matches, defeating Dominic Thiem but losing to Hubert Hurkacz, and Diego Schwartzman. Seeded 25th at the Australian Open, he was defeated in the first round by Sam Querrey.

Seeded fourth at the Argentina Open, Ćorić suffered a second-round loss at the hands of Thiago Monteiro. Seeded fifth at the Rio Open, he reached the semifinals where he was eliminated by third seed, Cristian Garín, who would end up winning the title. The ATP tour suspended tournaments from March through July due to the COVID-19 pandemic.

The ATP resumed tournament play during the week of August 24. At the Cincinnati Open, Ćorić lost in the second round to seventh seed and world No. 10, David Goffin. Seeded 27th at the US Open, he stunned fourth seed and world No. 6, Stefanos Tsitsipas, in the third round. Ćorić had to save a total of six match points in order to complete the upset. He reached the quarterfinals at a Grand Slam for the first time in his career. He ended up losing to fifth seed, world No. 7, and eventual finalist, Alexander Zverev.

After the US Open, Ćorić turned his attention to the clay-court season. He only played one clay-court tournament before the French Open. In Rome, he lost in the second round to Italian wildcard Stefano Travaglia. Seeded 24th at the French Open, he was beaten in the first round by Norbert Gombos.

In October, Ćorić played at the St. Petersburg Open. As the seventh seed and last year's finalist, he again reached the final where he fell to third seed and world No. 10, Andrey Rublev. In Vienna, he lost in the second round to World No. 1 Novak Djokovic. He had four set points in the first set, but he ultimately lost the match. Ćorić competed in his final tournament of the season at the Paris Masters. Seeded 15th, he was defeated in the second round by Jordan Thompson in three sets.

Ćorić ended the year ranked 24.

=== 2021: Shoulder surgery and hiatus ===
Ćorić started his 2021 season at the first edition of the Murray River Open. Seeded fourth, he reached the quarterfinals where he lost to eighth seed and eventual champion, Dan Evans. Seeded 22nd at the Australian Open, he was defeated in the second round by American Mackenzie McDonald.

In March, Ćorić competed at the Rotterdam Open. He made it to the semifinals where he lost to qualifier Márton Fucsovics. In May, he announced that he had undergone shoulder surgery. He ended up spending the rest of the year in recovery.

Ćorić ended the season ranked 73.

=== 2022: Return to tour, Lowest ranked Masters 1000 champion & back to top 30 ===
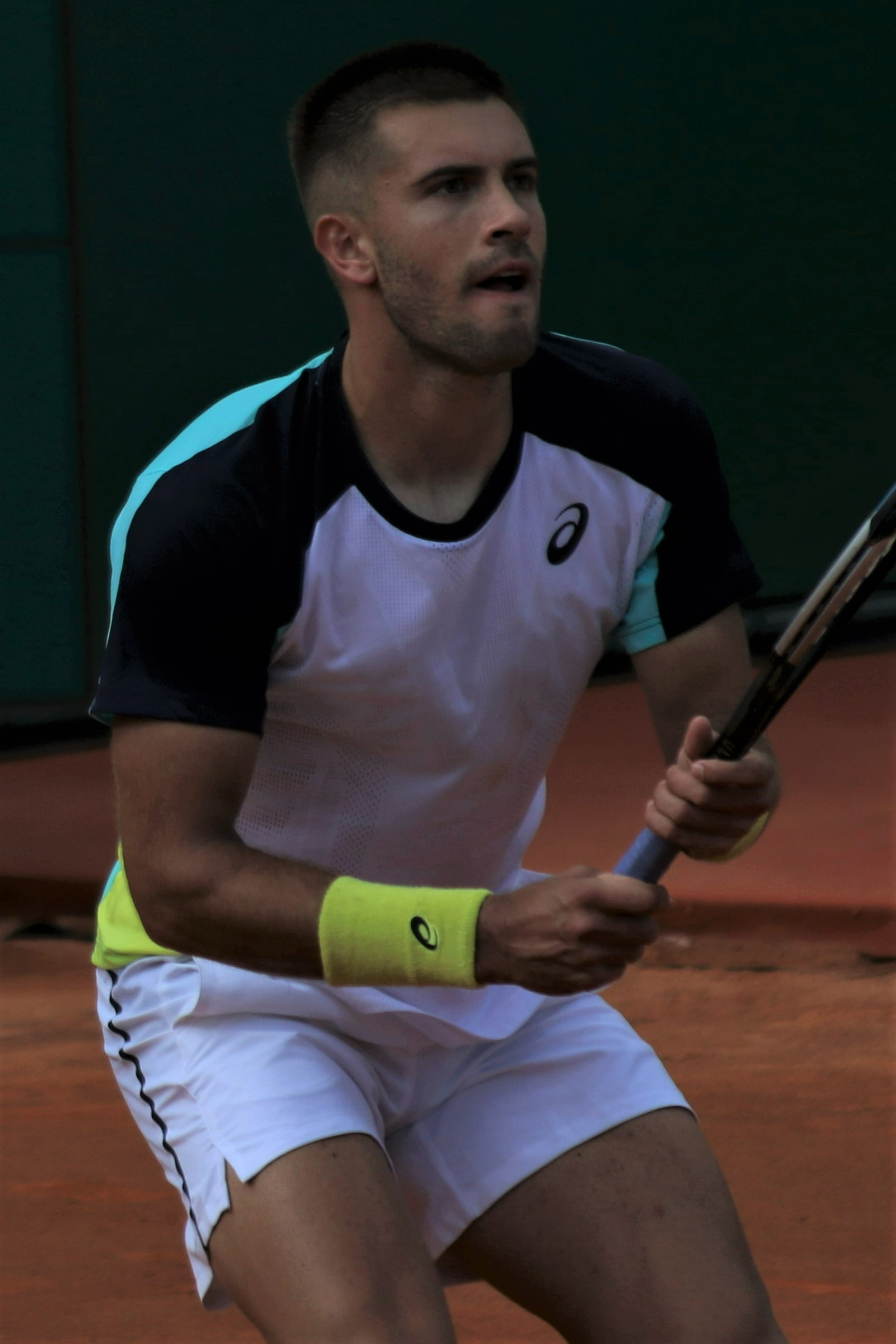
Ćorić at the 2022 Monte-Carlo Masters

Ćorić was one of the first players to show up in Australia toward the end of December to prepare for the 2022 season. However, he withdrew from the Australian Open due to his shoulder not being ready to compete.

He returned to action in March, playing at the Indian Wells Masters with a protected ranking. He lost in the first round to Alejandro Davidovich Fokina in three sets. At the Miami Open, he got his first win of the season by beating Fernando Verdasco in the first round. In the second round, he pushed second seed and 2018 finalist, Alexander Zverev, to three sets, but he ended up losing the match.

Starting his clay-court season at the Monte-Carlo Masters, Ćorić was defeated in the first round by ninth seed, Jannik Sinner, in three sets. The week of April 25 saw him playing at the Garden Open, a tournament that was part of the ATP Challenger Tour in Rome. He was beaten in the first round by third seed Italian, Flavio Cobolli, in three sets. At the Madrid Open, he lost in the first round to qualifier, Dušan Lajović, in three sets. In Rome, he fought hard but lost in the first round to qualifier Laslo Djere. Ranked No. 278 in the official rankings, at the French Open, Ćorić used again protected ranking to beat Spanish Carlos Taberner in the first round. Not only was this his first clay-court win of the season, but it was also his first win at Roland Garros since 2019. He lost in the second round to 18th seed, Grigor Dimitrov, in three sets.

After Roland Garros, Ćorić competed at the Internazionali di Tennis Città di Forlì, an ATP Challenger tournament. Playing as a wildcard, he lost in the first round to Gastão Elias. At the Internazionali di Tennis Città di Perugia, he reached the quarterfinals, where he was defeated by third seed, defending champion, and eventual finalist, Tomás Martín Etcheverry. Also in June, playing as a wildcard at the Emilia-Romagna Open, Ćorić won the title, beating Elias Ymer in the final, his third ATP Challenger title.

Ćorić withdrew from Wimbledon due to a shoulder injury. The week of July 11 saw Ćorić compete at the Iași Open, an ATP challenger tournament in Romania. He lost in the first round to Romanian wildcard Nicholas David Ionel. At the Hamburg Open, he won his first ATP tour match since May by beating Laslo Đere in the first round. In the second round, he defeated Tallon Griekspoor to reach his first ATP quarterfinal since March 2021. Unfortunately, he had to retire during his quarterfinal match against Alex Molčan.

Ćorić returned in August at the National Bank Open in Montreal. He lost in the first round to 13th seed Marin Čilić. Ranked 152 at the Western & Southern Open in Cincinnati, he upset second seed, world No. 3, and 2013 champion, Rafael Nadal, in the second round. He is one of three players to have played Nadal five times or more and have a winning record, the other two being Novak Djokovic and Nikolay Davydenko. He is the second-lowest-ranked player ever to win a match against Nadal, ranked higher only than Joachim Johansson in Stockholm 2006 (No. 690). It was also his 10th career win over a top-5 player. He followed up his second-round victory over Nadal by beating 15th seed, Roberto Bautista Agut, in the third round to reach his eighth career Masters quarterfinal and first since his quarterfinal showing at the Monte Carlo Masters in 2019. He became the lowest-ranked ATP Masters 1000 quarterfinalist since 239th ranked compatriot Ivo Karlović at 2011 Indian Wells. As a result, he moved more than 50 positions up back into the top 100. Then, he defeated seventh seed and world No. 9, Félix Auger-Aliassime, in the quarterfinals, recording two top-10 wins in the same tournament, and for the third time in his career to secure his third career semifinal at a Masters level and moved another 30 positions into the top 70 at world No. 66. He became the second-lowest-ranked semifinalist in Cincinnati since the start of the ATP rankings in 1973 (No. 203 Byron Bertram in 1975), and the third-lowest-ranked ATP Masters 1000 semifinalist since the start of the series in 1990. By beating ninth seed, Cameron Norrie, in the semifinals, he reached his second Masters final and became the lowest-ranked finalist in the history of the Cincinnati Masters. He was also the lowest-ranked player to reach the semifinals and final of a Masters event since No. 191 Andrei Pavel in 2003 Paris. As a result, he climbed another 20 positions, and more than 100 overall, into the top 50 at world No. 48. He won the title defeating fourth seed and world No. 7, Stefanos Tsitsipas, for his first Masters title becoming the lowest-ranked champion in Masters 1000 history. Consequently, he moved to No. 29 on 22 August 2022. Seeded 25th at the US Open, he lost in the second round to American Jenson Brooksby.

Ćorić continued his good form outside of America, recording his first two wins and reaching the quarterfinals at Tokyo by beating Thanasi Kokkinakis and Brandon Nakashima in straight sets. He then recorded his second win of the season and third straight victory against Stefanos Tsitsipas in the second round in Vienna to reach the fourth quarterfinal of his season. He beat Hubert Hurkacz in the quarterfinals in three sets, two of them tiebreakers, to advance to the semifinals where he lost to Denis Shapovalov.

=== 2023: First clay Masters semifinal, 200th win, back to top 15, Croatian No. 1 ===
Ćorić started his 2023 season by representing Croatia at the first edition of the United Cup. Croatia was in Group F alongside Argentina and France. Against Argentina, he beat Francisco Cerúndolo. Against France, he defeated Arthur Rinderknech. Croatia won the ties over Argentina 5-0 and France 3–2 to advance to the knockout stage. In the knockout stage against Greece, he lost to Stefanos Tsitsipas in three sets, despite having two match points in the second set. In the end, Greece beat Croatia 3–2. Seeded 21st at the Australian Open, he lost in the first round to eventual quarterfinalist Jiří Lehečka.

After the Australian Open, Ćorić represented Croatia in the Davis Cup tie against Austria. He won both of his matches over Dennis Novak and Dominic Thiem. Croatia ended up winning the tie over Austria 3–1 to qualify for the Davis Cup Finals. Seeded third at the Open Sud de France, he reached the quarterfinals where he was defeated by eventual finalist Maxime Cressy. After playing in Montpellier, Ćorić said he was looking forward to competing at the Rotterdam Open, but he withdrew from the tournament due to minor hip issues. He returned to action during the week of February 27 by playing at the Dubai Championships. Seeded eighth, he made it to the quarterfinals where he was beaten by third seed, world No. 7, and eventual champion, Daniil Medvedev. Seeded 18th at the BNP Paribas Open, he lost in the second round to Alex Molčan. Seeded 17th at the Miami Open, he was defeated in the second round by American qualifier Christopher Eubanks.

He reached his first Masters quarterfinal of the season at the 2023 Mutua Madrid Open defeating Hugo Gaston and an upset over twelfth seed Hubert Hurkacz. Next he defeated 29th seed Alejandro Davidovich Fokina in the second longest three sets match of the season lasting three hours and 28 minutes. He reached his fourth Masters semifinal and first on clay defeating lucky loser Daniel Altmaier. At the 2023 Italian Open he recorded his 200th career win over Thiago Monteiro becoming only the eighth man born in 1995 or later to reach that milestone. He defeated Roberto Carballés Baena and qualifier Fabian Marozsan to reach back-to-back quarterfinals and only his fourth in a clay Masters. At the 2023 French Open he defeated two Argentine players Federico Coria and Pedro Cachin to reach the third round for the fifth time in his career. As a result, he became the Croatian No. 1 on 12 June 2023.

=== 2024-2026: Four consecutive Challenger titles, out of top 100 ===
At the 2024 Open Sud de France he reached his ninth final and first since 2022, defeating top seed Holger Rune after he retired with an arm injury. At the 2024 Winston-Salem Open where Ćorić was defending semifinal points from the previous year edition, he defeated Sumit Nagal and upset top seed and defending champion Sebastian Baez avenging his last year's loss, both matches in straight sets.

Ćorić struggled for the rest of 2024, posting an overall 15–23 win-loss record in all competitions, including qualifiers. He dropped to No. 99 in the singles rankings in September, but a handful of ATP Challenger Tour match wins saw him finish the 2025 season at world No. 90 on 2 December 2024.

The beginning of 2025 continued in a similar fashion. Defending 279 ranking points in the first five weeks of the year, including the run to the final in Montpellier, he posted a 1–4 win-loss record, leading to a drop to No. 145 in the singles rankings. Taking three weeks off, Ćorić returned to the ATP Challenger Tour in Lugano, winning the title with a defeat over Belgium's Raphael Collignon in the final. Ćorić won back-to-back titles at the newly established Challenger in Thionville, France. Coric won a third consecutive title at the home Challenger, the 2025 Zadar Open and returned to the top 100 in the rankings on 31 March 2025. After dropping out from the top 100 again, he then defeated Stan Wawrinka to win the 2025 Open Aix Provence, which brought him back into the top 85 on 5 May 2025.

== Playing style and coaching ==
Ćorić is a defensive baseliner. He is very solid and consistent from primarily the backhand wing, but has shown some improvement from the forehand wing in 2018, and this improvement was praised in his defeats of Roger Federer in both the 2018 Halle final and Shanghai Masters semi-final. However, he continues to struggle hitting forehand groundstrokes in defensive positions or on the run. He has great coordination and footwork, thus allowing him to move well laterally on the court. His style of play lends itself to having long rallies and wearing down his opponent from the baseline. Due to the fact that he's born left-handed but plays with his right hand, the strengths in his game are his movement and his two-handed backhand. His forehand, with his long takeback and tendency to break down under the stress of an opponent's offence, has been cited as an area of possible focus in the future.

In addition, Ćorić also possesses a strong and precise serve, which enables him to win a lot of points easily during his service games. That in turn, helps to preserve his energy for return games and outlast opponents in long rallies, in order to break their serve. He punishes players who drop the ball short, by taking the ball on the rise and turning defense into offence effectively. For this reason Ćorić has been compared to Novak Djokovic. He has been lauded for his impressive mental fortitude in tough situations.

His past coaches have been Željko Krajan (2014–2015), Thomas Johansson (2015), Miles Maclagan (2016), Ivica Ančić (2016–2017), Riccardo Piatti & Kristijan Schneider (2017–2019), Antonio Veić (2019–2020), Martin Štěpánek (2020–2022), Mate Delić (2022–2024), Liam Smith (2024–2025).

== Personal life ==
Ćorić began playing tennis at age 5, after watching his father Damir play. He has one sister, Bruna. His idols growing up were Rafael Nadal and fellow countryman Goran Ivanišević. His favorite surface is outdoor hard courts. His favorite sports personality is Mike Tyson, whom he met at the 2016 BNP Paribas Open.

== Career statistics ==
=== Grand Slam performance timeline ===
Key
W	F	SF	QF	#R	RR	Q#	DNQ	A	NH

(W) winner; (F) finalist; (SF) semifinalist; (QF) quarterfinalist; (#R) rounds 4, 3, 2, 1; (RR) round-robin stage; (Q#) qualification round; (DNQ) did not qualify; (A) absent; (NH) not held; (SR) strike rate (events won / competed); (W–L) win–loss record.
To avoid confusion and double counting, these charts are updated at the conclusion of a tournament or when the player's participation has ended.

Current through the 2025 US Open.

Tournament	2014	2015	2016	2017	2018	2019	2020	2021	2022	2023	2024	2025	2026	SR	W–L	Win %
Australian Open	A	1R	1R	1R	1R	4R	1R	2R	A	1R	1R	1R	A	0 / 10	4–10	29%
French Open	A	3R	3R	2R	3R	3R	1R	A	2R	3R	1R	Q1	A	0 / 9	12–9	57%
Wimbledon	Q1	2R	1R	1R	1R	A	NH	A	A	1R	2R	A		0 / 6	2–6	25%
US Open	2R	1R	1R	3R	4R	2R	QF	A	2R	1R	1R	1R		0 / 11	12–10	55%
Win–loss	1–1	3–4	2–4	3–4	5–4	6–2	4–3	1–1	2–2	2–4	1–4	0–2	0–0	0 / 36	30–35	46%

=== Masters 1000 finals ===
==== Singles: 2 (1 title, 1 runner-up) ====
Result	Year	Tournament	Surface	Opponent	Score
Loss	2018	Shanghai Masters	Hard	(Serbia) Novak Djokovic	3–6, 4–6
Win	2022	Cincinnati Open	Hard	(Greece) Stefanos Tsitsipas	7–6^{(7–0)}, 6–2

== Awards ==
- ATP Star of Tomorrow (2014)
- ATP Comeback Player of the Year (2022)

Awards
Preceded by (Czech Republic) Jiří Veselý	ATP Star of Tomorrow; 2014	Succeeded by (Germany) Alexander Zverev
