= KSK Arena =

Multi-purpose indoor sporting arena in St. Petersburg, Russia

Arena Concert and Sports Complex
- KSK Arena
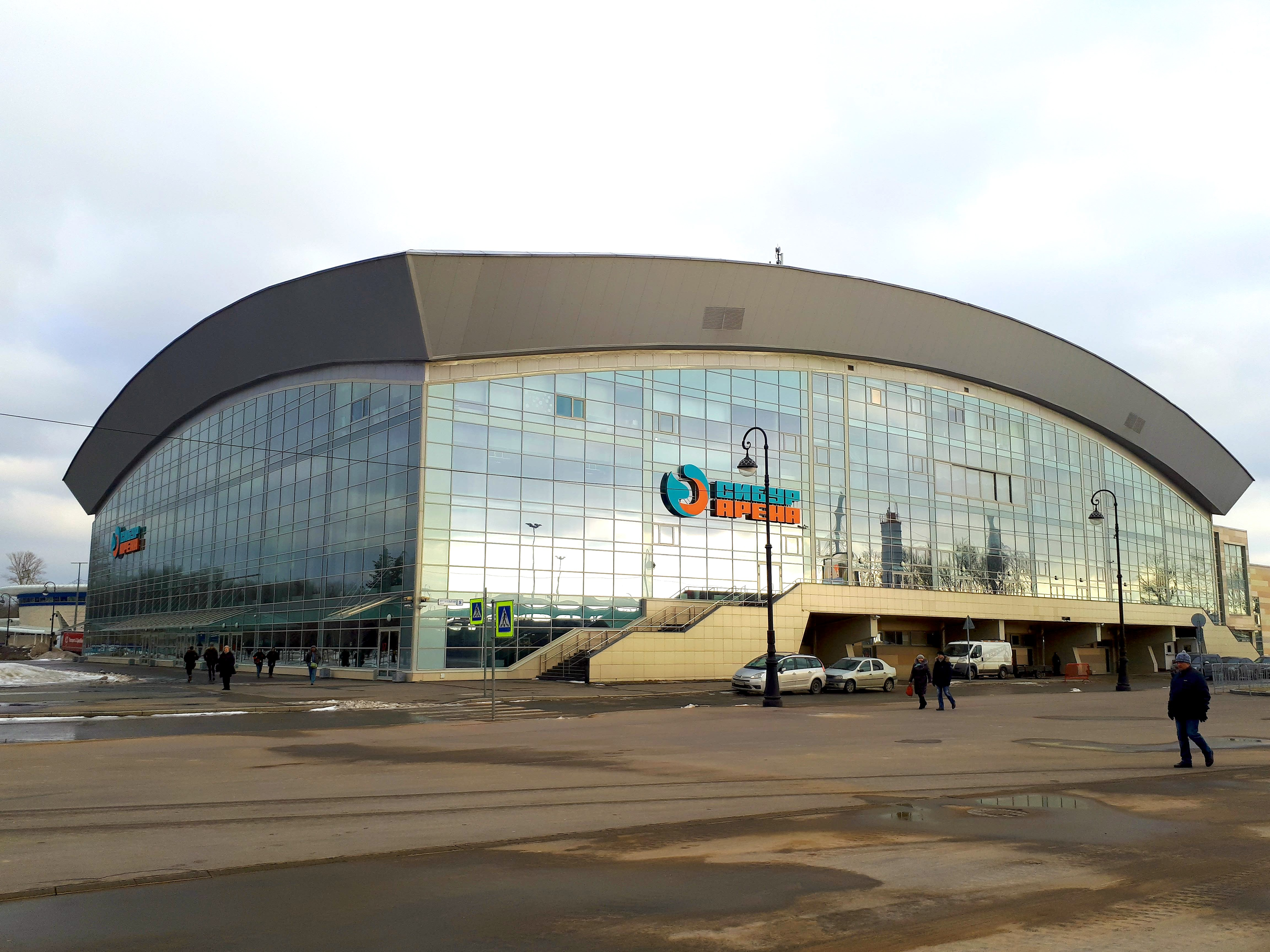
- St. Petersburg. Sibur Arena Complex
- Interactive map of Arena Concert and Sports Complex
- Location: Krestovsky Island, Saint Petersburg, Russia
- Coordinates: 59.9715°N 30.2267°E
- Capacity: Basketball: 7,120
- Surface: Parquet

Construction
- Groundbreaking: June 2010
- Opened: September 11, 2013
- Cost: rubles 1.3 billion (2013); Euro 17,3 million

Tenants
- BC Zenit Saint Petersburg (2017–Present); VC Zenit Saint Petersburg (2017–Present)

Website
- KSK Arena Website

KSK Arena (Russian: КСК «Арена»), mean Arena Concert and Sports Complex (Russian: Концертно-спортивный комплекс «Арена»), former commercial name Sibur Arena (Russian: Сибур Арена), is a multi-purpose indoor sporting arena that is located in the Petrogradsky District, Saint Petersburg, Russia. The arena can be used for basketball, volleyball, handball, futsal, tennis, and entertainment events. The seating capacity of the arena is 7,120. The arena also has 13 VIP boxes, which can accommodate a total of up to 390 fans.

== History ==
Construction on KSK Arena began in June 2010, and the arena was officially opened on September 11, 2013. The Russian basketball club BC Spartak Saint Petersburg, used the arena as its home arena, while it was playing in the VTB United League and the 2nd-tier level EuroCup during the 2013–14 season. The Russian basketball club BC Zenit Saint Petersburg, moved into the arena to use it as its home arena for both VTB United League and EuroCup games, for the 2014–15 season.
