= 2011 ITF Men's Circuit (January–March) =

The 2011 ITF Men's Circuit is the 2011 edition of the third-tier tour for men's professional tennis. It is organised by the International Tennis Federation and is a tier below the ATP Challenger Tour. During the months of January 2011 and March 2011 over 80 tournaments were played with the majority being played in the month of January.

== Key ==
$15,000 tournaments
$10,000 tournaments

== January ==
Week of	Tournament	Winner	Runners-up	Semifinalists	Quarterfinalists
(December 27, 2010)	Brazil F1 Futures; São Paulo, Brazil; Clay $15,000+H; Singles and Doubles Draw	(Portugal) Gastão Elias; 6–3, 6–0	(Brazil) André Ghem	(Belarus) Uladzimir Ignatik (Chinese Taipei) Yang Tsung-hua	(Italy) Thomas Fabbiano (Brazil) Ricardo Hocevar (Brazil) Caio Zampieri (Spain) Guillermo Alcaide
(December 27, 2010)	Brazil F1 Futures; São Paulo, Brazil; Clay $15,000+H; Singles and Doubles Draw	(Brazil) Franco Ferreiro (Brazil) André Ghem; 6–7^{(3–7)}, 6–4, [10–3]	(Italy) Thomas Fabbiano (Belarus) Uladzimir Ignatik	(Belarus) Uladzimir Ignatik (Chinese Taipei) Yang Tsung-hua	(Italy) Thomas Fabbiano (Brazil) Ricardo Hocevar (Brazil) Caio Zampieri (Spain) Guillermo Alcaide
January 3	Brazil F2 Futures; Salvador, Brazil; Clay $10,000; Singles and Doubles Draw	(Germany) Andre Begemann; 1–6, 6–4, 6–4	(Brazil) Eládio Ribeiro Neto	(Brazil) Thales Turini (Brazil) André Miele	(Paraguay) Daniel-Alejandro López (Brazil) Fabiano de Paula (Paraguay) José Benítez (Brazil) Caio Silva
January 3	Brazil F2 Futures; Salvador, Brazil; Clay $10,000; Singles and Doubles Draw	(Uruguay) Ariel Behar (Italy) Matteo Volante; 6–3, 6–2	(Paraguay) José Benítez (Paraguay) Daniel-Alejandro López	(Brazil) Thales Turini (Brazil) André Miele	(Paraguay) Daniel-Alejandro López (Brazil) Fabiano de Paula (Paraguay) José Benítez (Brazil) Caio Silva
January 10	Brazil F3 Futures; Aracaju, Brazil; Clay (indoor) $10,000	(Germany) Andre Begemann; 6–4, 6–2	(Sweden) Christian Lindell	(Brazil) Rodrigo Guidolin (Brazil) Tiago Slonik	(Brazil) Ricardo Hocevar (Brazil) Tiago Lopes (Brazil) Rafael Camilo (Brazil) Gabriel Dias
January 10	Brazil F3 Futures; Aracaju, Brazil; Clay (indoor) $10,000	(Brazil) Danilo Ferraz (Brazil) André Miele; 7–6^{(11–9)}, 6–4	(Brazil) Gabriel Dias (Brazil) Marlon Oliveira	(Brazil) Rodrigo Guidolin (Brazil) Tiago Slonik	(Brazil) Ricardo Hocevar (Brazil) Tiago Lopes (Brazil) Rafael Camilo (Brazil) Gabriel Dias
January 10	China F1 Futures; Mengzi, Honghe, China; Hard $15,000	(China) Wu Di; 2–6, 7–5, 6–3	(United Kingdom) Joshua Milton	(Croatia) Ante Pavić (United Kingdom) Daniel Cox	(China) Zhang Ze (China) Gong Maoxin (China) Li Zhe (South Korea) An Jae-sung
January 10	China F1 Futures; Mengzi, Honghe, China; Hard $15,000	(China) Gong Maoxin (China) Li Zhe; 6–1, 6–1	(Chinese Taipei) Lee Hsin-han (Chinese Taipei) Yi Chu-huan	(Croatia) Ante Pavić (United Kingdom) Daniel Cox	(China) Zhang Ze (China) Gong Maoxin (China) Li Zhe (South Korea) An Jae-sung
January 10	Germany F1 Futures; Schwieberdingen, Germany; Carpet (indoor) $10,000	(Latvia) Andis Juška; 3–6, 7–6^{(7–5)}, 6–4	(Austria) Philipp Oswald	(Czech Republic) Jan Mertl (Russia) Denis Matsukevich	(Slovakia) Miloslav Mečíř Jr. (Germany) Holger Fischer (Germany) Gero Kretschmer (France) Baptiste Bayet
January 10	Germany F1 Futures; Schwieberdingen, Germany; Carpet (indoor) $10,000	(Sweden) Daniel Danilović (Latvia) Andis Juška; 7–6^{(7–3)}, 3–6, [10–7]	(Germany) Martin Emmrich (Germany) Gero Kretschmer	(Czech Republic) Jan Mertl (Russia) Denis Matsukevich	(Slovakia) Miloslav Mečíř Jr. (Germany) Holger Fischer (Germany) Gero Kretschmer (France) Baptiste Bayet
January 10	Great Britain F1 Futures; Glasgow, Great Britain; Hard (indoor) $15,000	(France) Kenny de Schepper; 7–5, 7–5	(France) Alexandre Sidorenko	(Sweden) Michael Ryderstedt (Bosnia and Herzegovina) Mirza Bašić	(Belarus) Uladzimir Ignatik (United Kingdom) Jamie Baker (United Kingdom) Chris Eaton (United Kingdom) Daniel Evans
January 10	Great Britain F1 Futures; Glasgow, Great Britain; Hard (indoor) $15,000	(United Kingdom) Chris Eaton (United Kingdom) Alexander Slabinsky; 6–7^{(3–7)}, 6–1, [10–2]	(Finland) Harri Heliövaara (Finland) Juho Paukku	(Sweden) Michael Ryderstedt (Bosnia and Herzegovina) Mirza Bašić	(Belarus) Uladzimir Ignatik (United Kingdom) Jamie Baker (United Kingdom) Chris Eaton (United Kingdom) Daniel Evans
January 10	Israel F1 Futures; Eilat, Israel; Hard $10,000	(Russia) Valery Rudnev; 6–3, 6–1	(Switzerland) Henri Laaksonen	(Italy) Claudio Grassi (Latvia) Kārlis Lejnieks	(Slovakia) Kamil Čapkovič (Denmark) Philip Orno (Israel) Igor Smilansky (Czech Republic) Roman Vögeli
January 10	Israel F1 Futures; Eilat, Israel; Hard $10,000	(Slovakia) Jozef Kovalík (Slovakia) Adrian Sikora; 2–6, 6–3, [12–10]	(Canada) Steven Diez (Spain) Fernando Vicente	(Italy) Claudio Grassi (Latvia) Kārlis Lejnieks	(Slovakia) Kamil Čapkovič (Denmark) Philip Orno (Israel) Igor Smilansky (Czech Republic) Roman Vögeli
January 10	Spain F1 Futures; Mallorca, Spain; Clay $10,000	(Spain) Javier Martí; 7–6^{(7–5)}, 3–6, 6–4	(Spain) Pedro Clar Rosselló	(Spain) Gerard Granollers (France) Jonathan Eysseric	(Spain) Pablo Santos (Spain) Miguel Ángel López Jaén (Spain) Ignacio Coll Riudavets (Spain) José Checa Calvo
January 10	Spain F1 Futures; Mallorca, Spain; Clay $10,000	(Spain) Marc Fornell Mestres (Spain) Pablo Santos; 7–6^{(9–7)}, 6–7^{(4–7)}, [10–8]	(Spain) José Checa Calvo (Spain) Carles Poch Gradin	(Spain) Gerard Granollers (France) Jonathan Eysseric	(Spain) Pablo Santos (Spain) Miguel Ángel López Jaén (Spain) Ignacio Coll Riudavets (Spain) José Checa Calvo
January 10	Turkey F1 Futures; Antalya, Turkey; Hard $10,000	(Ukraine) Artem Smirnov; 6–4, 6–3	(France) Alexandre Renard	(Serbia) Dušan Lajović (France) Fabrice Martin	(Hungary) Attila Balázs (Slovenia) Aljaž Bedene (France) Kevin Botti (Russia) Andrey Kumantsov
January 10	Turkey F1 Futures; Antalya, Turkey; Hard $10,000	(Ukraine) Denys Molchanov (Ukraine) Artem Smirnov; 6–2, 6–2	(Croatia) Marin Draganja (Croatia) Dino Marcan	(Serbia) Dušan Lajović (France) Fabrice Martin	(Hungary) Attila Balázs (Slovenia) Aljaž Bedene (France) Kevin Botti (Russia) Andrey Kumantsov
January 10	USA F1 Futures; Plantation, USA; Clay $10,000	(Slovenia) Luka Gregorc; 3–6, 6–2, 6–0	(Haiti) Olivier Sajous	(United Kingdom) Daniel Smethurst (Slovakia) Matej Bočko	(United States) Wayne Odesnik (United States) Phillip Simmonds (United States) Alexander Domijan (Venezuela) David Souto
January 10	USA F1 Futures; Plantation, USA; Clay $10,000	(Moldova) Roman Borvanov (United States) Denis Zivkovic; 6–4, 6–4	(United Kingdom) Daniel Smethurst (United Kingdom) Alexander Ward	(United Kingdom) Daniel Smethurst (Slovakia) Matej Bočko	(United States) Wayne Odesnik (United States) Phillip Simmonds (United States) Alexander Domijan (Venezuela) David Souto
January 17	Brazil F4 Futures; Recife, Brazil; Clay (indoor) $10,000	(Brazil) Ricardo Hocevar; 6–3, 6–4	(Brazil) Rafael Camilo	(Brazil) Rodrigo Guidolin (Germany) Andre Begemann	(Brazil) André Miele (United Kingdom) Morgan Phillips (Sweden) Christian Lindell (Brazil) Caio Zampieri
January 17	Brazil F4 Futures; Recife, Brazil; Clay (indoor) $10,000	(Peru) Iván Miranda (Brazil) Caio Zampieri; 6–4, 5–7, [10–3]	(Brazil) Fabiano de Paula (Brazil) Marcelo Demoliner	(Brazil) Rodrigo Guidolin (Germany) Andre Begemann	(Brazil) André Miele (United Kingdom) Morgan Phillips (Sweden) Christian Lindell (Brazil) Caio Zampieri
January 17	China F2 Futures; Mengzi, Honghe, China; Hard $15,000	(China) Gong Maoxin; 6–1, 6–7^{(3–7)}, 6–2	(China) Zhang Ze	(Hungary) Márton Fucsovics (China) Li Zhe	(Croatia) Ante Pavić (United Kingdom) Joshua Milton (Japan) Yuichi Ito (United Kingdom) Daniel Cox
January 17	China F2 Futures; Mengzi, Honghe, China; Hard $15,000	(China) Gong Maoxin (China) Li Zhe; 4–6, 6–3, [10–4]	(Chinese Taipei) Lee Hsin-han (Chinese Taipei) Yi Chu-huan	(Hungary) Márton Fucsovics (China) Li Zhe	(Croatia) Ante Pavić (United Kingdom) Joshua Milton (Japan) Yuichi Ito (United Kingdom) Daniel Cox
January 17	Germany F2 Futures; Stuttgart, Germany; Hard (indoor) $10,000	(Czech Republic) Jan Mertl; 3–6, 6–3, 6–4	(Romania) Marius Copil	(Germany) Gero Kretschmer (Russia) Denis Matsukevich	(Italy) Luca Vanni (Belgium) Niels Desein (Germany) Dieter Kindlmann (Germany) Jakob Sude
January 17	Germany F2 Futures; Stuttgart, Germany; Hard (indoor) $10,000	(Germany) Martin Emmrich (Germany) Gero Kretschmer; 6–2, 3–6, [10–6]	(Germany) Bastian Knittel (Germany) Guido Tröster	(Germany) Gero Kretschmer (Russia) Denis Matsukevich	(Italy) Luca Vanni (Belgium) Niels Desein (Germany) Dieter Kindlmann (Germany) Jakob Sude
January 17	Great Britain F2 Futures; Sheffield, Great Britain; Hard (indoor) $15,000	(Finland) Harri Heliövaara; 6–4, 5–7, 6–4	(France) Kenny de Schepper	(Italy) Stefano Galvani (Bosnia and Herzegovina) Mirza Bašić	(Sweden) Ervin Eleskovic (France) Gleb Sakharov (Sweden) Michael Ryderstedt (United Kingdom) Liam Broady
January 17	Great Britain F2 Futures; Sheffield, Great Britain; Hard (indoor) $15,000	(United Kingdom) Chris Eaton (United Kingdom) Joshua Goodall; 6–1, 6–4	(France) Olivier Charroin (France) Vincent Stouff	(Italy) Stefano Galvani (Bosnia and Herzegovina) Mirza Bašić	(Sweden) Ervin Eleskovic (France) Gleb Sakharov (Sweden) Michael Ryderstedt (United Kingdom) Liam Broady
January 17	Israel F2 Futures; Eilat, Israel; Hard $10,000	(Hungary) Ádám Kellner; 6–3, 6–2	(Czech Republic) Roman Vögeli	(Israel) Amir Weintraub (Slovakia) Adrian Sikora	(Italy) Walter Trusendi (Russia) Stanislav Vovk (Slovakia) Jozef Kovalík (Russia) Valery Rudnev
January 17	Israel F2 Futures; Eilat, Israel; Hard $10,000	(Bosnia and Herzegovina) Damir Džumhur (Bosnia and Herzegovina) Ismar Gorčić; 6–3, 6–4	(Serbia) Nikola Ćaćić (Canada) Steven Diez	(Israel) Amir Weintraub (Slovakia) Adrian Sikora	(Italy) Walter Trusendi (Russia) Stanislav Vovk (Slovakia) Jozef Kovalík (Russia) Valery Rudnev
January 17	Mexico F1 Futures; Mexico City, Mexico; Hard $15,000	(Moldova) Roman Borvanov; 4–6, 6–2, 6–4	(Mexico) Miguel Gallardo-Vallés	(Mexico) Manuel Sánchez (Guatemala) Christopher Díaz Figueroa	(Philippines) Ruben Gonzales (Mexico) César Ramírez (Mexico) Miguel Ángel Reyes-Varela (Mexico) Luis Díaz Barriga
January 17	Mexico F1 Futures; Mexico City, Mexico; Hard $15,000	(Mexico) Luis Díaz Barriga (Mexico) Miguel Ángel Reyes-Varela; 6–4, 7–6^{(7–5)}	(Mexico) Mauricio Astorga (Mexico) Miguel Gallardo-Vallés	(Mexico) Manuel Sánchez (Guatemala) Christopher Díaz Figueroa	(Philippines) Ruben Gonzales (Mexico) César Ramírez (Mexico) Miguel Ángel Reyes-Varela (Mexico) Luis Díaz Barriga
January 17	Spain F2 Futures; Mallorca, Spain; Clay $10,000	(Spain) Pablo Carreño Busta; 2–6, 6–2, 6–3	(Spain) Pedro Clar Rosselló	(Spain) Adrián Menéndez (France) Jonathan Eysseric	(France) Maxime Teixeira (Spain) Marc Fornell Mestres (Spain) Javier Martí (Spain) Pablo Santos
January 17	Spain F2 Futures; Mallorca, Spain; Clay $10,000	(Spain) José Checa Calvo (Spain) Carles Poch Gradin walkover	(Spain) Marc Fornell Mestres (Spain) Gerard Granollers	(Spain) Adrián Menéndez (France) Jonathan Eysseric	(France) Maxime Teixeira (Spain) Marc Fornell Mestres (Spain) Javier Martí (Spain) Pablo Santos
January 17	Turkey F2 Futures; Antalya, Turkey; Hard $10,000	(Serbia) Dušan Lajović vs (Ukraine) Artem Smirnov Both final matches were cancelled by the supervisor.		(Slovenia) Aljaž Bedene (Russia) Andrey Kumantsov	(Hungary) Attila Balázs (Czech Republic) Jiří Školoudík (Russia) Ilia Starkov (United Kingdom) David Rice
January 17	Turkey F2 Futures; Antalya, Turkey; Hard $10,000	(Ukraine) Denys Molchanov / (Ukraine) Artem Smirnov vs (France) Kevin Botti / (France) Simon Cauvard		(Slovenia) Aljaž Bedene (Russia) Andrey Kumantsov	(Hungary) Attila Balázs (Czech Republic) Jiří Školoudík (Russia) Ilia Starkov (United Kingdom) David Rice
January 17	USA F2 Futures; Tamarac, USA; Clay $10,000	(United Kingdom) Alex Bogdanovic; 6–4, 0–6, 6–2	(United Kingdom) Daniel Smethurst	(United States) Phillip Simmonds (Mexico) Daniel Garza	(Venezuela) David Souto (South Korea) Daniel Yoo (United States) Nicholas Monroe (United States) Jesse Witten
January 17	USA F2 Futures; Tamarac, USA; Clay $10,000	(Barbados) Haydn Lewis (The Bahamas) Marvin Rolle; 6–4, 6–3	(South Korea) Cho Soong-jae (South Korea) Kim Hyun-joon	(United States) Phillip Simmonds (Mexico) Daniel Garza	(Venezuela) David Souto (South Korea) Daniel Yoo (United States) Nicholas Monroe (United States) Jesse Witten
January 24	Brazil F5 Futures; João Pessoa, Brazil; Clay $10,000	(Brazil) André Ghem; 6–4, 5–7, 7–6^{(7–1)}	(Brazil) Tiago Lopes	(Brazil) José Pereira (Peru) Iván Miranda	(Brazil) Bruno Semenzato (Argentina) Renzo Olivo (Brazil) Guilherme Clézar (Germany) Andre Begemann
January 24	Brazil F5 Futures; João Pessoa, Brazil; Clay $10,000	(Brazil) Marcelo Demoliner (United Kingdom) Morgan Phillips; 6–4, 6–3	(Uruguay) Ariel Behar (Venezuela) Luis David Martínez	(Brazil) José Pereira (Peru) Iván Miranda	(Brazil) Bruno Semenzato (Argentina) Renzo Olivo (Brazil) Guilherme Clézar (Germany) Andre Begemann
January 24	Cambodia F1 Futures; Phnom Penh, Cambodia; Hard $10,000	(Thailand) Danai Udomchoke; 6–2, 6–3	(India) Vishnu Vardhan	(Japan) Toshihide Matsui (Thailand) Kittipong Wachiramanowong	(Russia) Ervand Gasparyan (Japan) Bumpei Sato (India) Rohan Gajjar (Austria) Nikolaus Moser
January 24	Cambodia F1 Futures; Phnom Penh, Cambodia; Hard $10,000	(Thailand) Danai Udomchoke (Thailand) Kittipong Wachiramanowong; 6–4, 6–4	(India) Divij Sharan (India) Vishnu Vardhan	(Japan) Toshihide Matsui (Thailand) Kittipong Wachiramanowong	(Russia) Ervand Gasparyan (Japan) Bumpei Sato (India) Rohan Gajjar (Austria) Nikolaus Moser
January 24	France F1 Futures; Bagnoles-de-l'Orne, France; Hard (indoor) $10,000+H	(France) Maxime Teixeira; 7–6^{(7–4)}, 3–6, 6–2	(France) Jonathan Eysseric	(France) Romain Jouan (France) Laurent Rochette	(France) Olivier Patience (France) Maxime Forcin (France) Florian Reynet (France) Axel Michon
January 24	France F1 Futures; Bagnoles-de-l'Orne, France; Hard (indoor) $10,000+H	(France) Florian Reynet (France) Laurent Rochette; 7–6^{(7–5)}, 6–1	(France) Jonathan Eysseric (France) Romain Jouan	(France) Romain Jouan (France) Laurent Rochette	(France) Olivier Patience (France) Maxime Forcin (France) Florian Reynet (France) Axel Michon
January 24	Germany F3 Futures; Kaarst, Germany; Carpet (indoor) $15,000	(Czech Republic) Jan Mertl; 7–5, 6–4	(United Kingdom) Chris Eaton	(Germany) Gero Kretschmer (France) Ludovic Walter	(Finland) Henri Kontinen (Germany) Michel Dornbusch (Germany) Marcel Zimmermann (Germany) Peter Torebko
January 24	Germany F3 Futures; Kaarst, Germany; Carpet (indoor) $15,000	(Germany) Kevin Krawietz (Germany) Marcel Zimmermann; 6–3, 7–5	(United Kingdom) Chris Eaton (United Kingdom) Alexander Slabinsky	(Germany) Gero Kretschmer (France) Ludovic Walter	(Finland) Henri Kontinen (Germany) Michel Dornbusch (Germany) Marcel Zimmermann (Germany) Peter Torebko
January 24	Guatemala F1 Futures; Guatemala City, Guatemala; Hard $10,000	(Guatemala) Christopher Díaz Figueroa; 6–2, 4–6, 7–6^{(7–4)}	(Mexico) Manuel Sánchez	(Italy) Matteo Marrai (Australia) Chris Letcher	(Australia) Brendan Moore (Belgium) Alexandre Folie (Australia) Mark Verryth (Uruguay) Marcel Felder
January 24	Guatemala F1 Futures; Guatemala City, Guatemala; Hard $10,000	(Zimbabwe) Takanyi Garanganga (United States) Blake Strode; 7–5, 7–5	(Bulgaria) Boris Nicola Bakalov (United States) Adam El Mihdawy	(Italy) Matteo Marrai (Australia) Chris Letcher	(Australia) Brendan Moore (Belgium) Alexandre Folie (Australia) Mark Verryth (Uruguay) Marcel Felder
January 24	Israel F3 Futures; Eilat, Israel; Hard $10,000	(Hungary) Ádám Kellner; 6–3, 6–3	(Serbia) Nikola Ćaćić	(Israel) Amir Weintraub (Sweden) Milos Sekulic	(Sweden) Stefan Borg (Italy) Walter Trusendi (Slovakia) Jozef Kovalík (Belgium) Gaetan De Lovinfosse
January 24	Israel F3 Futures; Eilat, Israel; Hard $10,000	(Israel) Tal Eros (Israel) Amir Weintraub; 6–3, 6–1	(Israel) Alon Faiman (Israel) Tomer Hodorov	(Israel) Amir Weintraub (Sweden) Milos Sekulic	(Sweden) Stefan Borg (Italy) Walter Trusendi (Slovakia) Jozef Kovalík (Belgium) Gaetan De Lovinfosse
January 24	Spain F3 Futures; Mallorca, Spain; Clay $10,000	(Spain) Pedro Clar Rosselló; 7–5, 6–1	(Spain) Pablo Carreño Busta	(Spain) Sergio Gutiérrez Ferrol (Spain) Pablo Santos	(Russia) Ivan Nedelko (Spain) Javier Martí (Spain) José Checa Calvo (Japan) Taro Daniel
January 24	Spain F3 Futures; Mallorca, Spain; Clay $10,000	(Spain) Sergio Gutiérrez Ferrol (Spain) Rafael Mazón-Hernández; 6–2, 0–6, [10–6]	(Spain) Sergio Martos Gornés (Spain) Bartolomé Salvá Vidal	(Spain) Sergio Gutiérrez Ferrol (Spain) Pablo Santos	(Russia) Ivan Nedelko (Spain) Javier Martí (Spain) José Checa Calvo (Japan) Taro Daniel
January 24	Turkey F3 Futures; Antalya, Turkey; Hard $10,000	(Poland) Marcin Gawron; 7–5, 5–7, 6–4	(Ukraine) Artem Smirnov	(Ukraine) Denys Molchanov (United Kingdom) Jamie Baker	(Netherlands) David de Goede (Croatia) Dino Marcan (Poland) Grzegorz Panfil (United Kingdom) David Rice
January 24	Turkey F3 Futures; Antalya, Turkey; Hard $10,000	(Sweden) Patrik Brydolf (United Kingdom) David Rice; 3–6, 6–1, [10–5]	(Russia) Igor Karpov (Russia) Ilia Starkov	(Ukraine) Denys Molchanov (United Kingdom) Jamie Baker	(Netherlands) David de Goede (Croatia) Dino Marcan (Poland) Grzegorz Panfil (United Kingdom) David Rice
January 24	USA F3 Futures; Weston, USA; Clay $10,000	(United States) Phillip Simmonds; 6–2, 6–2	(United States) Jack Sock	(Romania) Teodor-Dacian Crăciun (Monaco) Benjamin Balleret	(South Korea) Kim Hyun-joon (Romania) Cătălin Gârd (United Kingdom) Alexander Ward (Bulgaria) Dimitar Kutrovsky
January 24	USA F3 Futures; Weston, USA; Clay $10,000	(South Korea) Cho Soong-jae (South Korea) Kim Hyun-joon; 6–3, 6–4	(Bulgaria) Dimitar Kutrovsky (United States) Jack Sock	(Romania) Teodor-Dacian Crăciun (Monaco) Benjamin Balleret	(South Korea) Kim Hyun-joon (Romania) Cătălin Gârd (United Kingdom) Alexander Ward (Bulgaria) Dimitar Kutrovsky
January 31	Brazil F6 Futures; Natal, Brazil; Clay $10,000	(Germany) Andre Begemann; 6–3, 6–3	(Brazil) Tiago Lopes	(Peru) Iván Miranda (Brazil) José Pereira	(Brazil) Marcelo Demoliner (Paraguay) Daniel-Alejandro López (Brazil) Augusto Laranja (Brazil) Fabiano de Paula
January 31	Brazil F6 Futures; Natal, Brazil; Clay $10,000	(Brazil) Tiago Lopes (Peru) Iván Miranda; 6–2, 6–1	(Brazil) Marcelo Demoliner (United Kingdom) Morgan Phillips	(Peru) Iván Miranda (Brazil) José Pereira	(Brazil) Marcelo Demoliner (Paraguay) Daniel-Alejandro López (Brazil) Augusto Laranja (Brazil) Fabiano de Paula
January 31	Cambodia F2 Futures; Phnom Penh, Cambodia; Hard $10,000	(India) Karan Rastogi; 6–1, 6–3	(India) Vijay Sundar Prashanth	(India) Ranjeet Virali-Murugesan (Japan) Arata Onozawa	(India) Yuki Bhambri (Thailand) Perakiat Siriluethaiwattana (Russia) Ervand Gasparyan (China) Gao Peng
January 31	Cambodia F2 Futures; Phnom Penh, Cambodia; Hard $10,000	(Chinese Taipei) Huang Liang-chi (Chinese Taipei) Lee Hsin-han; 6–3, 6–4	(India) Yuki Bhambri (India) Vivek Shokeen	(India) Ranjeet Virali-Murugesan (Japan) Arata Onozawa	(India) Yuki Bhambri (Thailand) Perakiat Siriluethaiwattana (Russia) Ervand Gasparyan (China) Gao Peng
January 31	Colombia F1 Futures; Cúcuta, Colombia; Clay $15,000	(Argentina) Martín Alund; 7–5, 6–3	(Argentina) Andrés Molteni	(Colombia) Juan Sebastián Cabal (Dominican Republic) Víctor Estrella	(Portugal) Gastão Elias (Peru) Sergio Galdós (Colombia) Alejandro González (Colombia) Juan Sebastián Gómez
January 31	Colombia F1 Futures; Cúcuta, Colombia; Clay $15,000	(Argentina) Martín Alund (Argentina) Diego Álvarez; 6–4, 6–4	(Colombia) Alejandro González (Colombia) Eduardo Struvay	(Colombia) Juan Sebastián Cabal (Dominican Republic) Víctor Estrella	(Portugal) Gastão Elias (Peru) Sergio Galdós (Colombia) Alejandro González (Colombia) Juan Sebastián Gómez
January 31	El Salvador F1 Futures; Santa Tecla, El Salvador; Clay $10,000	(Uruguay) Marcel Felder; 6–4, 7–6^{(9–7)}	(Argentina) Agustín Velotti	(Guatemala) Christopher Díaz Figueroa (Italy) Matteo Marrai	(Philippines) Ruben Gonzales (Uruguay) Martín Cuevas (El Salvador) Rafael Arévalo (Argentina) Juan-Manuel Valverde
January 31	El Salvador F1 Futures; Santa Tecla, El Salvador; Clay $10,000	(Australia) Chris Letcher (Australia) Brendan Moore; 6–2, 6–2	(Mexico) Luis Díaz Barriga (Mexico) Miguel Ángel Reyes-Varela	(Guatemala) Christopher Díaz Figueroa (Italy) Matteo Marrai	(Philippines) Ruben Gonzales (Uruguay) Martín Cuevas (El Salvador) Rafael Arévalo (Argentina) Juan-Manuel Valverde
January 31	France F2 Futures; Feucherolles, France; Hard (indoor) $10,000+H	(Spain) Arnau Brugués Davi; 2–6, 6–3, 7–5	(France) Fabrice Martin	(France) David Guez (France) Ludovic Walter	(France) Jonathan Dasnières de Veigy (United Kingdom) Sean Thornley (Italy) Riccardo Ghedin (Belgium) Maxime Authom
January 31	France F2 Futures; Feucherolles, France; Hard (indoor) $10,000+H	(Italy) Riccardo Ghedin (France) Fabrice Martin; 6–3, 6–2	(France) Gleb Sakharov (France) Vincent Stouff	(France) David Guez (France) Ludovic Walter	(France) Jonathan Dasnières de Veigy (United Kingdom) Sean Thornley (Italy) Riccardo Ghedin (Belgium) Maxime Authom
January 31	Germany F4 Futures; Nussloch, Germany; Carpet (indoor) $15,000	(Sweden) Ervin Eleskovic; 7–5, 6–4	(Germany) Jan-Lennard Struff	(Germany) Holger Fischer (United Kingdom) Joshua Goodall	(Germany) Gero Kretschmer (Germany) Nils Langer (Germany) Peter Gojowczyk (France) Pierre-Hugues Herbert
January 31	Germany F4 Futures; Nussloch, Germany; Carpet (indoor) $15,000	(Chile) Hans Podlipnik (Austria) Max Raditschnigg; 6–4, 6–4	(Germany) Gero Kretschmer (Germany) Peter Torebko	(Germany) Holger Fischer (United Kingdom) Joshua Goodall	(Germany) Gero Kretschmer (Germany) Nils Langer (Germany) Peter Gojowczyk (France) Pierre-Hugues Herbert
January 31	Spain F4 Futures; Murcia, Spain; Clay $10,000	(Spain) Guillermo Olaso; 7–6^{(7–2)}, 6–1	(Spain) Javier Martí	(Spain) Pedro Clar Rosselló (Spain) Carlos Boluda-Purkiss	(Spain) Pablo Martín-Adalia (Spain) Marcos Giraldi Requena (Spain) Pablo Santos (Germany) Alexander Flock
January 31	Spain F4 Futures; Murcia, Spain; Clay $10,000	(Spain) Gabriel Trujillo Soler (Spain) Andoni Vivanco-Guzmán; 6–1, 6–2	(Spain) Miguel Ángel López Jaén (Spain) Pablo Santos	(Spain) Pedro Clar Rosselló (Spain) Carlos Boluda-Purkiss	(Spain) Pablo Martín-Adalia (Spain) Marcos Giraldi Requena (Spain) Pablo Santos (Germany) Alexander Flock
January 31	USA F4 Futures; Palm Coast, USA; Clay $10,000	(United States) Wayne Odesnik; 6–2, 6–1	(Italy) Nicola Ghedin	(Australia) Matt Reid (Romania) Răzvan Sabău	(Romania) Teodor-Dacian Crăciun (United States) Jack Sock (United States) Andrea Collarini (United States) Blake Strode
January 31	USA F4 Futures; Palm Coast, USA; Clay $10,000	(Bulgaria) Dimitar Kutrovsky (United States) Jack Sock; 6–3, 3–6, [10–8]	(United States) Greg Ouellette (United States) Blake Strode	(Australia) Matt Reid (Romania) Răzvan Sabău	(Romania) Teodor-Dacian Crăciun (United States) Jack Sock (United States) Andrea Collarini (United States) Blake Strode

== February ==
Week of	Tournament	Winner	Runners-up	Semifinalists	Quarterfinalists
February 7	Colombia F2 Futures; Cartagena, Colombia; Hard $15,000	(Portugal) Gastão Elias; 6–3, 6–3	(Tunisia) Malek Jaziri	(Colombia) Juan Sebastián Cabal (Colombia) Alejandro González	(Argentina) Diego Schwartzman (Argentina) Andrés Molteni (Ecuador) Julio César Campozano (Argentina) Sebastián Decoud
February 7	Colombia F2 Futures; Cartagena, Colombia; Hard $15,000	(Argentina) Cristián Benedetti (Colombia) Juan Sebastián Gómez; 6–7^{(5–7)}, 6–2, [10–5]	(Colombia) Felipe Rojas (Colombia) Pedro Pablo Ruiz	(Colombia) Juan Sebastián Cabal (Colombia) Alejandro González	(Argentina) Diego Schwartzman (Argentina) Andrés Molteni (Ecuador) Julio César Campozano (Argentina) Sebastián Decoud
February 7	France F3 Futures; Bressuire, France; Hard (indoor) $10,000+H	(Belgium) Maxime Authom; 6–4, 6–4	(Spain) Arnau Brugués Davi	(United Kingdom) Liam Broady (France) Baptiste Dupuy	(Czech Republic) Jiří Školoudík (France) Albano Olivetti (France) Fabrice Martin (France) Jonathan Dasnières de Veigy
February 7	France F3 Futures; Bressuire, France; Hard (indoor) $10,000+H	(United Kingdom) David Rice (United Kingdom) Sean Thornley walkover	(France) Médy Chettar (France) Valentin Nourrissat	(United Kingdom) Liam Broady (France) Baptiste Dupuy	(Czech Republic) Jiří Školoudík (France) Albano Olivetti (France) Fabrice Martin (France) Jonathan Dasnières de Veigy
February 7	Panama F1 Futures; Panama City, Panama; Clay $10,000	(Dominican Republic) Víctor Estrella; 6–3, 6–0	(Argentina) Martín Alund	(Australia) Matt Reid (United States) Wayne Odesnik	(Romania) Cătălin Gârd (United States) Ryan Young (Italy) Stefano Travaglia (Guatemala) Christopher Díaz Figueroa
February 7	Panama F1 Futures; Panama City, Panama; Clay $10,000	(Uruguay) Martín Cuevas (Uruguay) Marcel Felder; 7–5, 6–3	(Bulgaria) Boris Nicola Bakalov (Germany) Alex Satschko	(Australia) Matt Reid (United States) Wayne Odesnik	(Romania) Cătălin Gârd (United States) Ryan Young (Italy) Stefano Travaglia (Guatemala) Christopher Díaz Figueroa
February 7	Spain F5 Futures; Murcia, Spain; Clay $10,000	(Spain) Pablo Carreño Busta; 1–0, ret.	(Spain) Pablo Santos	(Spain) Miguel Ángel López Jaén (Spain) David Estruch	(Spain) Jordi Samper Montaña (Spain) Pablo Martín-Adalia (Spain) Pedro Clar Rosselló (Spain) Sergio Gutiérrez Ferrol
February 7	Spain F5 Futures; Murcia, Spain; Clay $10,000	(Spain) Carles Poch Gradin (Spain) Gabriel Trujillo Soler; 6–4, 6–2	(Spain) Sergio Gutiérrez Ferrol (Spain) Rafael Mazón-Hernández	(Spain) Miguel Ángel López Jaén (Spain) David Estruch	(Spain) Jordi Samper Montaña (Spain) Pablo Martín-Adalia (Spain) Pedro Clar Rosselló (Spain) Sergio Gutiérrez Ferrol
February 7	Turkey F4 Futures; Antalya, Turkey; Hard $10,000	(Austria) Michael Linzer; 4–6, 6–1, 6–1	(Romania) Adrian Cruciat	(Russia) Ivan Nedelko (Poland) Adam Chadaj	(Bosnia and Herzegovina) Aldin Šetkić (Spain) José Checa Calvo (Czech Republic) Michal Konečný (Moldova) Andrei Gorban
February 7	Turkey F4 Futures; Antalya, Turkey; Hard $10,000	(Belarus) Siarhei Betau (Ukraine) Denys Molchanov; 6–4, 6–2	(Czech Republic) Michal Konečný (South Africa) Ruan Roelofse	(Russia) Ivan Nedelko (Poland) Adam Chadaj	(Bosnia and Herzegovina) Aldin Šetkić (Spain) José Checa Calvo (Czech Republic) Michal Konečný (Moldova) Andrei Gorban
February 14	Croatia F1 Futures; Zagreb, Croatia; Clay (indoor) $10,000	(Germany) Marcel Zimmermann; 6–3, 5–7, 6–4	(Bosnia and Herzegovina) Mirza Bašić	(Finland) Timo Nieminen (Croatia) Roko Karanušić	(Croatia) Antonio Sančić (Croatia) Toni Androić (Slovenia) Aljaž Bedene (Germany) Peter Torebko
February 14	Croatia F1 Futures; Zagreb, Croatia; Clay (indoor) $10,000	(United Kingdom) Joshua Milton (Netherlands) Tim van Terheijden; 7–6^{(8–6)}, 5–7, [10–4]	(Germany) Kevin Krawietz (Germany) Marcel Zimmermann	(Finland) Timo Nieminen (Croatia) Roko Karanušić	(Croatia) Antonio Sančić (Croatia) Toni Androić (Slovenia) Aljaž Bedene (Germany) Peter Torebko
February 14	Spain F6 Futures; Cartagena, Spain; Clay $10,000	(Spain) Pedro Clar Rosselló; 6–3, 7–6^{(7–2)}	(Spain) Pablo Carreño Busta	(Spain) Carlos Boluda-Purkiss (Spain) Gabriel Trujillo Soler	(Spain) Marc Fornell Mestres (Spain) Óscar Sabaté-Bretos (Netherlands) Mark Vervoort (Sweden) Christian Lindell
February 14	Spain F6 Futures; Cartagena, Spain; Clay $10,000	(Spain) Carles Poch Gradin (Spain) Gabriel Trujillo Soler; 6–3, 6–1	(Spain) Marc Fornell Mestres (Australia) Allen Perel	(Spain) Carlos Boluda-Purkiss (Spain) Gabriel Trujillo Soler	(Spain) Marc Fornell Mestres (Spain) Óscar Sabaté-Bretos (Netherlands) Mark Vervoort (Sweden) Christian Lindell
February 14	Turkey F5 Futures; Antalya, Turkey; Hard $10,000	(Germany) Cedrik-Marcel Stebe; 6–4, 6–3	(Ukraine) Denys Molchanov	(United Kingdom) Daniel Smethurst (Russia) Valery Rudnev	(Romania) Adrian Cruciat (Moldova) Andrei Gorban (United Kingdom) Alexander Ward (France) Gianni Mina
February 14	Turkey F5 Futures; Antalya, Turkey; Hard $10,000	(New Zealand) Marcus Daniell (New Zealand) Michael Venus; 2–6, 6–1, [11–9]	(Russia) Alexander Rumyantsev (Russia) Dmitri Sitak	(United Kingdom) Daniel Smethurst (Russia) Valery Rudnev	(Romania) Adrian Cruciat (Moldova) Andrei Gorban (United Kingdom) Alexander Ward (France) Gianni Mina
February 21	Australia F1 Futures; Mildura, Australia; Grass $15,000	(Australia) James Lemke; 6–4, 6–2	(Australia) Isaac Frost	(Australia) Michael Look (United Kingdom) Burnham Alridge	(Australia) Andrew Whittington (Japan) Hiroki Moriya (Canada) Érik Chvojka (Australia) James Duckworth
February 21	Australia F1 Futures; Mildura, Australia; Grass $15,000	(Canada) Érik Chvojka (Australia) Sadik Kadir; 4–6, 6–4, [10–7]	(Australia) Matthew Barton (Australia) Colin Ebelthite	(Australia) Michael Look (United Kingdom) Burnham Alridge	(Australia) Andrew Whittington (Japan) Hiroki Moriya (Canada) Érik Chvojka (Australia) James Duckworth
February 21	Croatia F2 Futures; Zagreb, Croatia; Hard (indoor) $15,000	(Croatia) Nikola Mektić; 7–6^{(8–6)}, ret.	(Switzerland) Michael Lammer	(France) David Guez (Serbia) Ivan Bjelica	(Germany) Kevin Krawietz (Croatia) Kristijan Mesaroš (Latvia) Kārlis Lejnieks (Germany) Marcel Zimmermann
February 21	Croatia F2 Futures; Zagreb, Croatia; Hard (indoor) $15,000	(Croatia) Mislav Hižak (Croatia) Ante Pavić; 6–3, 6–7^{(3–7)}, [10–4]	(Croatia) Mate Delić (Croatia) Kristijan Mesaroš	(France) David Guez (Serbia) Ivan Bjelica	(Germany) Kevin Krawietz (Croatia) Kristijan Mesaroš (Latvia) Kārlis Lejnieks (Germany) Marcel Zimmermann
February 21	Turkey F6 Futures; Antalya, Turkey; Hard $10,000	(Germany) Cedrik-Marcel Stebe; 6–1, 6–0	(Belgium) Yannik Reuter	(Czech Republic) Roman Jebavý (New Zealand) Michael Venus	(Poland) Grzegorz Panfil (Poland) Marcin Gawron (Slovakia) Norbert Gombos (France) Jonathan Eysseric
February 21	Turkey F6 Futures; Antalya, Turkey; Hard $10,000	The doubles event was cancelled due to bad weather conditions.		(Czech Republic) Roman Jebavý (New Zealand) Michael Venus	(Poland) Grzegorz Panfil (Poland) Marcin Gawron (Slovakia) Norbert Gombos (France) Jonathan Eysseric
February 21	USA F5 Futures; Brownsville, USA; Hard $15,000	(United States) Nicholas Monroe; 6–3, 3–6, 6–1	(Hungary) Dénes Lukács	(United States) Greg Ouellette (Moldova) Roman Borvanov	(Bulgaria) Boris Nicola Bakalov (Argentina) Juan Pablo Ortiz (India) Yuki Bhambri (Argentina) Marco Trungelliti
February 21	USA F5 Futures; Brownsville, USA; Hard $15,000	(United States) Devin Britton (United States) Greg Ouellette; 6–1, 6–3	(Bulgaria) Boris Nicola Bakalov (Georgia (country)) Nikoloz Basilashvili	(United States) Greg Ouellette (Moldova) Roman Borvanov	(Bulgaria) Boris Nicola Bakalov (Argentina) Juan Pablo Ortiz (India) Yuki Bhambri (Argentina) Marco Trungelliti
February 28	Australia F2 Futures; Berri, Australia; Grass $15,000	(Australia) Benjamin Mitchell; 2–6, 6–4, 6–3	(Australia) Michael Look	(India) Vishnu Vardhan (Japan) Hiroki Moriya	(Australia) Brendan Moore (Chinese Taipei) Huang Liang-chi (Canada) Érik Chvojka (Australia) Chris Letcher
February 28	Australia F2 Futures; Berri, Australia; Grass $15,000	(India) Divij Sharan (India) Vishnu Vardhan; 4–6, 6–3, [10–8]	(Australia) Chris Letcher (Australia) Brendan Moore	(India) Vishnu Vardhan (Japan) Hiroki Moriya	(Australia) Brendan Moore (Chinese Taipei) Huang Liang-chi (Canada) Érik Chvojka (Australia) Chris Letcher
February 28	Canada F1 Futures; Montreal, Canada; Hard (indoor) $15,000	(France) Charles-Antoine Brézac; 6–4, 6–4	(France) Albano Olivetti	(United States) Adam El Mihdawy (Canada) Philip Bester	(South Africa) Fritz Wolmarans (Belgium) Julien Dubail (United States) Tyler Hochwalt (Barbados) Darian King
February 28	Canada F1 Futures; Montreal, Canada; Hard (indoor) $15,000	(Barbados) Darian King (Barbados) Haydn Lewis; 6–4, 2–6, [10–5]	(Belgium) Maxime Authom (Switzerland) Adrien Bossel	(United States) Adam El Mihdawy (Canada) Philip Bester	(South Africa) Fritz Wolmarans (Belgium) Julien Dubail (United States) Tyler Hochwalt (Barbados) Darian King
February 28	Portugal F1 Futures; Faro, Portugal; Hard $10,000	(Slovakia) Kamil Čapkovič; 6–4, 3–6, 6–2	(Portugal) Pedro Sousa	(Spain) Gerard Granollers (Egypt) Mohamed Safwat	(Spain) Pablo Martín-Adalia (Italy) Matteo Marrai (Venezuela) David Souto (France) Rudy Coco
February 28	Portugal F1 Futures; Faro, Portugal; Hard $10,000	(Canada) Steven Diez (Spain) Fernando Vicente; 6–3, 6–4	(Spain) Agustín Boje-Ordóñez (Spain) Pablo Martín-Adalia	(Spain) Gerard Granollers (Egypt) Mohamed Safwat	(Spain) Pablo Martín-Adalia (Italy) Matteo Marrai (Venezuela) David Souto (France) Rudy Coco
February 28	Turkey F7 Futures; Antalya, Turkey; Hard $10,000	(Moldova) Radu Albot; 7–5, 6–4	(South Africa) Ruan Roelofse	(Russia) Evgeny Kirillov (Romania) Andrei Mlendea	(Romania) Răzvan Sabău (Austria) Michael Linzer (Russia) Ivan Nedelko (Slovakia) Norbert Gombos
February 28	Turkey F7 Futures; Antalya, Turkey; Hard $10,000	(Czech Republic) Roman Jebavý (Slovakia) Adrian Sikora; 4–6, 6–2, [10–6]	(Italy) Pietro Fanucci (Italy) Francesco Piccari	(Russia) Evgeny Kirillov (Romania) Andrei Mlendea	(Romania) Răzvan Sabău (Austria) Michael Linzer (Russia) Ivan Nedelko (Slovakia) Norbert Gombos
February 28	Ukraine F1 Futures; Cherkasy, Ukraine; Hard (indoor) $10,000	(Ukraine) Artem Smirnov; 6–3, 6–4	(Russia) Alexander Rumyantsev	(Russia) Mikhail Vasiliev (Ukraine) Stanislav Poplavskyy	(Russia) Ervand Gasparyan (Russia) Denis Matsukevich (Russia) Valery Rudnev (Italy) Luca Vanni
February 28	Ukraine F1 Futures; Cherkasy, Ukraine; Hard (indoor) $10,000	(Czech Republic) Michal Konečný (Czech Republic) Michal Schmid; 4–6, 6–4, [13–11]	(Russia) Victor Baluda (Russia) Alexander Rumyantsev	(Russia) Mikhail Vasiliev (Ukraine) Stanislav Poplavskyy	(Russia) Ervand Gasparyan (Russia) Denis Matsukevich (Russia) Valery Rudnev (Italy) Luca Vanni
February 28	USA F6 Futures; Harlingen, USA; Hard $15,000	(Australia) Dayne Kelly; 6–1, 6–3	(United Kingdom) Daniel Cox	(Argentina) Marco Trungelliti (Zimbabwe) Takanyi Garanganga	(Italy) Erik Crepaldi (Romania) Cătălin Gârd (Israel) Gilad Ben Zvi (United States) Robbye Poole
February 28	USA F6 Futures; Harlingen, USA; Hard $15,000	(Sweden) Daniel Danilović (United States) Joshua Zavala; 6–0, 6–4	(Argentina) Juan Pablo Ortiz (Argentina) Marco Trungelliti	(Argentina) Marco Trungelliti (Zimbabwe) Takanyi Garanganga	(Italy) Erik Crepaldi (Romania) Cătălin Gârd (Israel) Gilad Ben Zvi (United States) Robbye Poole

== March ==
Week of	Tournament	Winner	Runners-up	Semifinalists	Quarterfinalists
March 7	Canada F2 Futures; Sherbrooke, Canada; Hard (indoor) $15,000	(France) Charles-Antoine Brézac; 4–6, 6–2, 6–2	(Belgium) Maxime Authom	(United States) Jesse Levine (Canada) Philip Bester	(Canada) Vasek Pospisil (United Kingdom) David Rice (France) Ludovic Walter (Switzerland) Adrien Bossel
March 7	Canada F2 Futures; Sherbrooke, Canada; Hard (indoor) $15,000	(France) Charles-Antoine Brézac (France) Vincent Stouff; 6–3, 3–6, [10–5]	(United States) Brett Joelson (United States) Jesse Levine	(United States) Jesse Levine (Canada) Philip Bester	(Canada) Vasek Pospisil (United Kingdom) David Rice (France) Ludovic Walter (Switzerland) Adrien Bossel
March 7	France F4 Futures; Lille, France; Hard (indoor) $15,000	(France) Marc Gicquel; 6–3, 6–2	(France) Jonathan Eysseric	(France) Nicolas Renavand (France) Élie Rousset	(France) Kenny de Schepper (France) Fabrice Martin (France) Romain Jouan (France) Médy Chettar
March 7	France F4 Futures; Lille, France; Hard (indoor) $15,000	(France) Kenny de Schepper (France) Alexandre Penaud; 6–3, 2–6, [10–8]	(France) Marc Gicquel (France) Nicolas Renavand	(France) Nicolas Renavand (France) Élie Rousset	(France) Kenny de Schepper (France) Fabrice Martin (France) Romain Jouan (France) Médy Chettar
March 7	Great Britain F3 Futures; Tipton, Great Britain; Hard (indoor) $15,000	(Belgium) Yannick Mertens; 6–2, 7–6^{(8–6)}	(United Kingdom) Daniel Evans	(United Kingdom) Joshua Goodall (Germany) Peter Torebko	(United Kingdom) James Marsalek (United Kingdom) Marcus Willis (United Kingdom) Andrew Fitzpatrick (United Kingdom) Richard Bloomfield
March 7	Great Britain F3 Futures; Tipton, Great Britain; Hard (indoor) $15,000	(United Kingdom) Chris Eaton (United Kingdom) Joshua Goodall; 6–2, 6–2	(United Kingdom) Miles Bugby (United Kingdom) Marcus Willis	(United Kingdom) Joshua Goodall (Germany) Peter Torebko	(United Kingdom) James Marsalek (United Kingdom) Marcus Willis (United Kingdom) Andrew Fitzpatrick (United Kingdom) Richard Bloomfield
March 7	Italy F1 Futures; Trento, Italy; Hard (indoor) $15,000	(Italy) Stefano Galvani; 6–4, 3–6, 6–3	(France) Grégoire Burquier	(Romania) Petru-Alexandru Luncanu (Czech Republic) Jan Mertl	(Italy) Walter Trusendi (Serbia) Dušan Lajović (Italy) Andrea Agazzi (Switzerland) Michael Lammer
March 7	Italy F1 Futures; Trento, Italy; Hard (indoor) $15,000	(Latvia) Deniss Pavlovs (Italy) Walter Trusendi; 6–2, 7–5	(France) Kevin Botti (France) Grégoire Burquier	(Romania) Petru-Alexandru Luncanu (Czech Republic) Jan Mertl	(Italy) Walter Trusendi (Serbia) Dušan Lajović (Italy) Andrea Agazzi (Switzerland) Michael Lammer
March 7	Portugal F2 Futures; Loulé, Portugal; Hard $10,000	(Spain) Gerard Granollers; 6–3, 6–3	(Slovakia) Kamil Čapkovič	(Germany) Marc Sieber (United Kingdom) Morgan Phillips	(Spain) Javier Martí (Spain) Sergio Gutiérrez Ferrol (Spain) Andrés Artuñedo (United Kingdom) Matthew Short
March 7	Portugal F2 Futures; Loulé, Portugal; Hard $10,000	(Germany) Steven Moneke (Germany) Marc Sieber; 7–5, 6–4	(Portugal) Gonçalo Falcão (Netherlands) Antal van der Duim	(Germany) Marc Sieber (United Kingdom) Morgan Phillips	(Spain) Javier Martí (Spain) Sergio Gutiérrez Ferrol (Spain) Andrés Artuñedo (United Kingdom) Matthew Short
March 7	Spain F7 Futures; Sabadell, Spain; Clay $10,000	(Russia) Evgeny Donskoy; 7–5, 7–5	(Italy) Simone Vagnozzi	(France) Axel Michon (Spain) Adrián Menéndez	(Russia) Ilya Belyaev (Italy) Lorenzo Giustino (Italy) Daniele Giorgini (Spain) Íñigo Cervantes Huegun
March 7	Spain F7 Futures; Sabadell, Spain; Clay $10,000	(Italy) Daniele Giorgini (Italy) Simone Vagnozzi; 6–3, 6–2	(Spain) Miguel Ángel López Jaén (Spain) Gabriel Trujillo Soler	(France) Axel Michon (Spain) Adrián Menéndez	(Russia) Ilya Belyaev (Italy) Lorenzo Giustino (Italy) Daniele Giorgini (Spain) Íñigo Cervantes Huegun
March 7	Turkey F8 Futures; Antalya, Turkey; Hard $10,000	(Romania) Andrei Mlendea; 6–3, 6–3	(Italy) Alessandro Giannessi	(Italy) Federico Gaio (Ukraine) Denys Molchanov	(France) Florian Reynet (Slovakia) Norbert Gombos (Poland) Rafał Gozdur (Romania) Răzvan Sabău
March 7	Turkey F8 Futures; Antalya, Turkey; Hard $10,000	(Moldova) Radu Albot (Ukraine) Denys Molchanov; 6–7^{(3–7)}, 6–3, [12–10]	(Czech Republic) Roman Jebavý (Slovakia) Adrian Sikora	(Italy) Federico Gaio (Ukraine) Denys Molchanov	(France) Florian Reynet (Slovakia) Norbert Gombos (Poland) Rafał Gozdur (Romania) Răzvan Sabău
March 7	Ukraine F2 Futures; Cherkasy, Ukraine; Hard (indoor) $10,000	(Russia) Denis Matsukevich; 7–6^{(7–3)}, 4–6, 6–3	(Ukraine) Artem Smirnov	(Moldova) Andrei Gorban (Ukraine) Denys Mylokostov	(Ukraine) Stanislav Poplavskyy (Belarus) Nikolai Fidirko (Russia) Alexander Rumyantsev (Russia) Sergei Krotiouk
March 7	Ukraine F2 Futures; Cherkasy, Ukraine; Hard (indoor) $10,000	(Ukraine) Stanislav Poplavskyy (Ukraine) Artem Smirnov; 7–5, 6–3	(Ukraine) Ivan Anikanov (Russia) Sergei Krotiouk	(Moldova) Andrei Gorban (Ukraine) Denys Mylokostov	(Ukraine) Stanislav Poplavskyy (Belarus) Nikolai Fidirko (Russia) Alexander Rumyantsev (Russia) Sergei Krotiouk
March 7	USA F7 Futures; McAllen, USA; Hard $15,000	(United States) Wayne Odesnik; 6–7^{(5–7)}, 6–4, 6–1	(Portugal) Gastão Elias	(United Kingdom) Daniel Cox (United States) Robbye Poole	(United States) Devin Britton (Australia) Dayne Kelly (Romania) Cătălin Gârd (United States) Jordan Cox
March 7	USA F7 Futures; McAllen, USA; Hard $15,000	(Australia) Jared Easton (Australia) Dayne Kelly; 2–6, 6–3, [11–9]	(Sweden) Daniel Danilović (United States) Joshua Zavala	(United Kingdom) Daniel Cox (United States) Robbye Poole	(United States) Devin Britton (Australia) Dayne Kelly (Romania) Cătălin Gârd (United States) Jordan Cox
March 14	France F5 Futures; Poitiers, France; Hard (indoor) $15,000+H	(France) Marc Gicquel; 7–6^{(7–4)}, 7–6^{(7–5)}	(France) Kenny de Schepper	(France) Nicolas Renavand (France) Fabrice Martin	(France) Émilien Firmin (France) Josselin Ouanna (France) Pierre-Hugues Herbert (France) Grégoire Burquier
March 14	France F5 Futures; Poitiers, France; Hard (indoor) $15,000+H	(France) Romain Jouan (France) Fabrice Martin; 7–6^{(7–5)}, 6–4	(France) Kenny de Schepper (France) Julien Obry	(France) Nicolas Renavand (France) Fabrice Martin	(France) Émilien Firmin (France) Josselin Ouanna (France) Pierre-Hugues Herbert (France) Grégoire Burquier
March 14	Great Britain F4 Futures; Bath, Great Britain; Hard (indoor) $15,000	(Sweden) Michael Ryderstedt; 1–6, 7–6^{(8–6)}, 6–3	(United Kingdom) Daniel Evans	(United Kingdom) Chris Eaton (Belgium) Yannick Mertens	(United Kingdom) Daniel Smethurst (Germany) Peter Torebko (Italy) Stefano Galvani (United Kingdom) Alex Bogdanovic
March 14	Great Britain F4 Futures; Bath, Great Britain; Hard (indoor) $15,000	(United Kingdom) Chris Eaton (United Kingdom) Joshua Goodall; 6–3, 6–2	(Switzerland) Michael Lammer (Switzerland) Alexander Sadecky	(United Kingdom) Chris Eaton (Belgium) Yannick Mertens	(United Kingdom) Daniel Smethurst (Germany) Peter Torebko (Italy) Stefano Galvani (United Kingdom) Alex Bogdanovic
March 14	India F1 Futures; Mumbai, India; Hard $15,000	(India) Yuki Bhambri; 2–6, 7–5, 6–3	(Croatia) Roko Karanušić	(Germany) Gero Kretschmer (Hungary) Ádám Kellner	(India) Karan Rastogi (India) Rohan Gajjar (India) Vishnu Vardhan (Thailand) Kittipong Wachiramanowong
March 14	India F1 Futures; Mumbai, India; Hard $15,000	(India) Purav Raja (India) Divij Sharan; 7–6^{(7–4)}, 7–6^{(7–5)}	(Germany) Gero Kretschmer (Germany) Alex Satschko	(Germany) Gero Kretschmer (Hungary) Ádám Kellner	(India) Karan Rastogi (India) Rohan Gajjar (India) Vishnu Vardhan (Thailand) Kittipong Wachiramanowong
March 14	Italy F2 Futures; Cividino, Italy; Hard (indoor) $10,000	(Serbia) Dušan Lajović; 3–6, 6–4, 6–3	(Italy) Andrea Stoppini	(Germany) Florian Fallert (Italy) Luca Vanni	(Italy) Enrico Iannuzzi (Italy) Andrea Agazzi (Czech Republic) Otakar Lucák (Georgia (country)) Lado Chikhladze
March 14	Italy F2 Futures; Cividino, Italy; Hard (indoor) $10,000	(Italy) Enrico Fioravante (Colombia) Cristian Rodríguez; 6–4, 7–6^{(18–16)}	(Italy) Enrico Iannuzzi (Italy) Luca Vanni	(Germany) Florian Fallert (Italy) Luca Vanni	(Italy) Enrico Iannuzzi (Italy) Andrea Agazzi (Czech Republic) Otakar Lucák (Georgia (country)) Lado Chikhladze
March 14	Portugal F3 Futures; Albufeira, Portugal; Hard $10,000	(Spain) Gerard Granollers; 7–6^{(7–3)}, 4–6, 7–5	(Poland) Adam Chadaj	(Italy) Claudio Grassi (Slovakia) Kamil Čapkovič	(United Kingdom) Morgan Phillips (Spain) Agustín Boje-Ordóñez (Egypt) Mohamed Safwat (Sweden) Carl Bergman
March 14	Portugal F3 Futures; Albufeira, Portugal; Hard $10,000	(Spain) Agustín Boje-Ordóñez (United Kingdom) Morgan Phillips; 6–3, 7–6^{(7–4)}	(Republic of Ireland) Sam Berry (Republic of Ireland) Daniel Glancy	(Italy) Claudio Grassi (Slovakia) Kamil Čapkovič	(United Kingdom) Morgan Phillips (Spain) Agustín Boje-Ordóñez (Egypt) Mohamed Safwat (Sweden) Carl Bergman
March 14	Russia F1 Futures; Moscow, Russia; Hard (indoor) $15,000+H	(Russia) Denis Matsukevich; 7–5, 6–2	(Belarus) Siarhei Betau	(Russia) Valery Rudnev (Russia) Victor Baluda	(Russia) Mikhail Ledovskikh (Latvia) Andis Juška (Russia) Ervand Gasparyan (Belarus) Aliaksandr Bury
March 14	Russia F1 Futures; Moscow, Russia; Hard (indoor) $15,000+H	(Latvia) Andis Juška (Latvia) Deniss Pavlovs; 6–4, 7–6^{(7–5)}	(Russia) Denis Matsukevich (Russia) Mikhail Vasiliev	(Russia) Valery Rudnev (Russia) Victor Baluda	(Russia) Mikhail Ledovskikh (Latvia) Andis Juška (Russia) Ervand Gasparyan (Belarus) Aliaksandr Bury
March 14	Spain F8 Futures; Badalona, Spain; Clay $10,000	(Spain) David Estruch; 6–4, 6–7^{(5–7)}, 6–4	(Spain) Pedro Clar Rosselló	(Italy) Giorgio Portaluri (Italy) Daniele Giorgini	(Russia) Ivan Nedelko (Italy) Lorenzo Giustino (Spain) Jordi Samper Montaña (Spain) Gabriel Trujillo Soler
March 14	Spain F8 Futures; Badalona, Spain; Clay $10,000	(Spain) Miguel Ángel López Jaén (Spain) Gabriel Trujillo Soler; 7–5, 2–6, [10–8]	(France) Axel Michon (France) Guillaume Rufin	(Italy) Giorgio Portaluri (Italy) Daniele Giorgini	(Russia) Ivan Nedelko (Italy) Lorenzo Giustino (Spain) Jordi Samper Montaña (Spain) Gabriel Trujillo Soler
March 14	Switzerland F1 Futures; Fällanden, Switzerland; Carpet (indoor) $10,000	(Germany) Holger Fischer; 7–6^{(9–7)}, 6–2	(Switzerland) Sandro Ehrat	(Germany) Matthias Kolbe (Czech Republic) Jiří Kosler	(Czech Republic) Michal Schmid (Germany) Nils Langer (Switzerland) Raphaël Hemmeler (Germany) Mark-Alexander Kepler
March 14	Switzerland F1 Futures; Fällanden, Switzerland; Carpet (indoor) $10,000	(Germany) Nils Langer (Austria) Marc Rath; 6–3, 7–6^{(7–5)}	(Belgium) Gaëtan De Lovinfosse (Netherlands) David Pel	(Germany) Matthias Kolbe (Czech Republic) Jiří Kosler	(Czech Republic) Michal Schmid (Germany) Nils Langer (Switzerland) Raphaël Hemmeler (Germany) Mark-Alexander Kepler
March 14	Turkey F9 Futures; Antalya, Turkey; Hard $10,000	(Austria) Daniel Köllerer; 6–1, 6–0	(Colombia) Alejandro González	(Hungary) Attila Balázs (France) Florian Reynet	(Germany) Sascha Klör (Croatia) Toni Androić (Egypt) Omar Hedayet (Serbia) Ivan Bjelica
March 14	Turkey F9 Futures; Antalya, Turkey; Hard $10,000	(Croatia) Toni Androić (Croatia) Dino Marcan; 3–6, 6–2, [10–7]	(Serbia) Ivan Bjelica (Bulgaria) Tihomir Grozdanov	(Hungary) Attila Balázs (France) Florian Reynet	(Germany) Sascha Klör (Croatia) Toni Androić (Egypt) Omar Hedayet (Serbia) Ivan Bjelica
March 14	Ukraine F3 Futures; Cherkasy, Ukraine; Hard (indoor) $10,000	(Ukraine) Artem Smirnov; 7–6^{(7–5)}, 6–7^{(2–7)}, 7–6^{(7–4)}	(Latvia) Kārlis Lejnieks	(Ukraine) Leonard Stakhovsky (Poland) Grzegorz Panfil	(Ukraine) Gleb Alekseenko (Russia) Andrei Levine (Ukraine) Ivan Anikanov (Ukraine) Vladyslav Manafov
March 14	Ukraine F3 Futures; Cherkasy, Ukraine; Hard (indoor) $10,000	(Slovenia) Rok Jarc (Slovenia) Tom Kočevar-Dešman; 6–3, 7–6^{(7–4)}	(Ukraine) Ivan Anikanov (Poland) Grzegorz Panfil	(Ukraine) Leonard Stakhovsky (Poland) Grzegorz Panfil	(Ukraine) Gleb Alekseenko (Russia) Andrei Levine (Ukraine) Ivan Anikanov (Ukraine) Vladyslav Manafov
March 21	Croatia F3 Futures; Poreč, Croatia; Clay $10,000	(Croatia) Kristijan Mesaroš; 6–4, 6–2	(Germany) Dennis Blömke	(Monaco) Jean-René Lisnard (Italy) Massimo Capone	(Slovakia) Norbert Gombos (Germany) Marc Sieber (Germany) Kevin Krawietz (Germany) Marcel Zimmermann
March 21	Croatia F3 Futures; Poreč, Croatia; Clay $10,000	(Germany) Steven Moneke (Germany) Marc Sieber; 6–3, 6–3	(Germany) Kevin Krawietz (Germany) Marcel Zimmermann	(Monaco) Jean-René Lisnard (Italy) Massimo Capone	(Slovakia) Norbert Gombos (Germany) Marc Sieber (Germany) Kevin Krawietz (Germany) Marcel Zimmermann
March 21	India F2 Futures; Kolkata, India; Clay $15,000	(Hungary) Ádám Kellner; 6–3, 6–1	(Croatia) Roko Karanušić	(India) Kaza Vinayak Sharma (Austria) Nicolas Reissig	(India) Yuki Bhambri (India) Ranjeet Virali-Murugesan (Austria) Tristan-Samuel Weissborn (Germany) Jaan-Frederik Brunken
March 21	India F2 Futures; Kolkata, India; Clay $15,000	(India) Divij Sharan (India) Vishnu Vardhan; 7–6^{(7–1)}, 7–6^{(7–5)}	(India) Sriram Balaji (India) Ashutosh Singh	(India) Kaza Vinayak Sharma (Austria) Nicolas Reissig	(India) Yuki Bhambri (India) Ranjeet Virali-Murugesan (Austria) Tristan-Samuel Weissborn (Germany) Jaan-Frederik Brunken
March 21	Italy F3 Futures; Foggia, Italy; Clay $15,000+H	(Serbia) Dušan Lajović; 6–2, 6–7^{(7–9)}, 6–2	(Italy) Walter Trusendi	(Italy) Marco Crugnola (Spain) Sergio Gutiérrez Ferrol	(Italy) Marco Viola (United Kingdom) Morgan Phillips (Italy) Enrico Fioravante (Italy) Matteo Marrai
March 21	Italy F3 Futures; Foggia, Italy; Clay $15,000+H	(Spain) Sergio Gutiérrez Ferrol (Spain) Rafael Mazón-Hernández; 6–3, 7–5	(Italy) Fabio Colangelo (Italy) Matteo Volante	(Italy) Marco Crugnola (Spain) Sergio Gutiérrez Ferrol	(Italy) Marco Viola (United Kingdom) Morgan Phillips (Italy) Enrico Fioravante (Italy) Matteo Marrai
March 21	Russia F2 Futures; Tyumen, Russia; Hard (indoor) $15,000	(Russia) Valery Rudnev; 5–7, 6–2, 6–4	(Russia) Mikhail Ledovskikh	(Latvia) Deniss Pavlovs (Latvia) Andis Juška	(Russia) Mikhail Vasiliev (Uzbekistan) Murad Inoyatov (Russia) Alexey Vatutin (Russia) Ervand Gasparyan
March 21	Russia F2 Futures; Tyumen, Russia; Hard (indoor) $15,000	(Russia) Alexander Rumyantsev (Russia) Andrei Vasilevski; 6–2, 6–4	(Russia) Vitali Reshetnikov (Russia) Dmitri Sitak	(Latvia) Deniss Pavlovs (Latvia) Andis Juška	(Russia) Mikhail Vasiliev (Uzbekistan) Murad Inoyatov (Russia) Alexey Vatutin (Russia) Ervand Gasparyan
March 21	Spain F9 Futures; Barcelona, Spain; Clay $10,000	(Germany) Jan-Lennard Struff; 6–4, 6–3	(Spain) Pedro Clar Rosselló	(Argentina) Juan-Pablo Villar (Spain) Gabriel Trujillo Soler	(Australia) Matthew Barton (United Kingdom) Liam Broady (Spain) Marcelo Palacios (Canada) Steven Diez
March 21	Spain F9 Futures; Barcelona, Spain; Clay $10,000	(Spain) Miguel Ángel López Jaén (Spain) Gabriel Trujillo Soler; 6–2, 6–0	(Spain) Arnau Dachs (Spain) Enrique López Pérez	(Argentina) Juan-Pablo Villar (Spain) Gabriel Trujillo Soler	(Australia) Matthew Barton (United Kingdom) Liam Broady (Spain) Marcelo Palacios (Canada) Steven Diez
March 21	Switzerland F2 Futures; Vaduz, Liechtenstein, Switzerland; Carpet (indoor) $10,000	(Austria) Johannes Ager; 3–6, 6–3, 7–6^{(7–5)}	(France) Fabrice Martin	(Germany) Holger Fischer (France) Albano Olivetti	(Germany) Nils Langer (Germany) Matthias Kolbe (France) Rudy Coco (Italy) Alessandro Bega
March 21	Switzerland F2 Futures; Vaduz, Liechtenstein, Switzerland; Carpet (indoor) $10,000	(Republic of Ireland) James Cluskey (France) Fabrice Martin; 7–6^{(7–2)}, 6–4	(Poland) Piotr Gadomski (Netherlands) Tim van Terheijden	(Germany) Holger Fischer (France) Albano Olivetti	(Germany) Nils Langer (Germany) Matthias Kolbe (France) Rudy Coco (Italy) Alessandro Bega
March 21	Turkey F10 Futures; Antalya, Turkey; Clay $10,000	(Serbia) Miljan Zekić; 6–4, 6–3	(Sweden) Patrik Brydolf	(Croatia) Toni Androić (Ukraine) Gleb Alekseenko	(Moldova) Radu Albot (Croatia) Dino Marcan (Czech Republic) Jakub Lustyk (Italy) Alessandro Colella
March 21	Turkey F10 Futures; Antalya, Turkey; Clay $10,000	(Croatia) Toni Androić (Croatia) Dino Marcan; 6–1, 6–2	(Moldova) Radu Albot (Moldova) Andrei Ciumac	(Croatia) Toni Androić (Ukraine) Gleb Alekseenko	(Moldova) Radu Albot (Croatia) Dino Marcan (Czech Republic) Jakub Lustyk (Italy) Alessandro Colella
March 28	Australia F3 Futures; Ipswich, Australia; Clay $15,000	(Australia) James Lemke; 6–2, 6–0	(Canada) Érik Chvojka	(New Zealand) Michael Venus (Japan) Kento Takeuchi	(Australia) James Duckworth (Australia) Isaac Frost (Australia) Leon Frost (New Zealand) Marcus Daniell
March 28	Australia F3 Futures; Ipswich, Australia; Clay $15,000	(Australia) James Lemke (Australia) Dane Propoggia; 6–7^{(4–7)}, 6–2, [10–5]	(South Korea) Cho Soong-jae (South Korea) Nam Ji-sung	(New Zealand) Michael Venus (Japan) Kento Takeuchi	(Australia) James Duckworth (Australia) Isaac Frost (Australia) Leon Frost (New Zealand) Marcus Daniell
March 28	Chile F1 Futures; Viña del Mar, Chile; Clay $10,000	(Italy) Stefano Travaglia; 6–2, 6–4	(Chile) Guillermo Rivera Aránguiz	(France) Axel Michon (Argentina) Diego Schwartzman	(Chile) Ricardo Urzúa-Rivera (Ecuador) Roberto Quiroz (Chile) Cristóbal Saavedra Corvalán (Argentina) Juan-Manuel Valverde
March 28	Chile F1 Futures; Viña del Mar, Chile; Clay $10,000	(Argentina) Renzo Olivo (Italy) Stefano Travaglia; 5–7, 6–3, [10–1]	(Chile) Guillermo Rivera Aránguiz (Chile) Cristóbal Saavedra Corvalán	(France) Axel Michon (Argentina) Diego Schwartzman	(Chile) Ricardo Urzúa-Rivera (Ecuador) Roberto Quiroz (Chile) Cristóbal Saavedra Corvalán (Argentina) Juan-Manuel Valverde
March 28	Croatia F4 Futures; Rovinj, Croatia; Clay $10,000	(Croatia) Kristijan Mesaroš; 6–2, 6–0	(Germany) Marcel Zimmermann	(France) Jonathan Dasnières de Veigy (Germany) Steven Moneke	(Slovakia) Michal Pažický (Germany) Dennis Blömke (Germany) Kevin Krawietz (Austria) Michael Linzer
March 28	Croatia F4 Futures; Rovinj, Croatia; Clay $10,000	(Slovakia) Kamil Čapkovič (Slovakia) Michal Pažický; 6–2, 6–1	(Germany) Kevin Krawietz (Germany) Marcel Zimmermann	(France) Jonathan Dasnières de Veigy (Germany) Steven Moneke	(Slovakia) Michal Pažický (Germany) Dennis Blömke (Germany) Kevin Krawietz (Austria) Michael Linzer
March 28	Spain F10 Futures; Reus, Spain; Clay $10,000	(Spain) Pedro Clar Rosselló; 6–4, 6–3	(Germany) Jan-Lennard Struff	(Argentina) Juan-Pablo Villar (Spain) Gabriel Trujillo Soler	(Spain) Carlos Calderón-Rodríguez (Belgium) Arthur De Greef (Venezuela) David Souto (Spain) Juan Lizariturry
March 28	Spain F10 Futures; Reus, Spain; Clay $10,000	(Spain) Marc Fornell Mestres (Luxembourg) Mike Vermeer; 7–6^{(7–3)}, 6–7^{(1–7)}, [10–8]	(Germany) Jan-Lennard Struff (Germany) Richard Waite	(Argentina) Juan-Pablo Villar (Spain) Gabriel Trujillo Soler	(Spain) Carlos Calderón-Rodríguez (Belgium) Arthur De Greef (Venezuela) David Souto (Spain) Juan Lizariturry
March 28	Switzerland F3 Futures; Lugano, Switzerland; Carpet (indoor) $10,000	(United Kingdom) Chris Eaton; 6–3, 6–4	(Germany) Peter Torebko	(Italy) Riccardo Sinicropi (Czech Republic) Michal Konečný	(Latvia) Kārlis Lejnieks (France) Rudy Coco (Poland) Grzegorz Panfil (Lithuania) Laurynas Grigelis
March 28	Switzerland F3 Futures; Lugano, Switzerland; Carpet (indoor) $10,000	(Republic of Ireland) James Cluskey (Italy) Claudio Grassi; 6–2, 6–1	(Italy) Erik Crepaldi (Poland) Piotr Gadomski	(Italy) Riccardo Sinicropi (Czech Republic) Michal Konečný	(Latvia) Kārlis Lejnieks (France) Rudy Coco (Poland) Grzegorz Panfil (Lithuania) Laurynas Grigelis
March 28	Thailand F1 Futures; Khon Kaen, Thailand; Hard $10,000	(Thailand) Danai Udomchoke; 6–0, 6–2	(Chinese Taipei) Chen Ti	(Germany) Jaan-Frederik Brunken (Thailand) Kittipong Wachiramanowong	(Indonesia) Christopher Rungkat (Thailand) Kirati Siributwong (France) Antoine Escoffier (France) Simon Cauvard
March 28	Thailand F1 Futures; Khon Kaen, Thailand; Hard $10,000	(Thailand) Weerapat Doakmaiklee (Thailand) Kittipong Wachiramanowong; 1–6, 6–2, [10–8]	(South Korea) Im Kyu-tae (Thailand) Danai Udomchoke	(Germany) Jaan-Frederik Brunken (Thailand) Kittipong Wachiramanowong	(Indonesia) Christopher Rungkat (Thailand) Kirati Siributwong (France) Antoine Escoffier (France) Simon Cauvard
March 28	Turkey F11 Futures; Antalya, Turkey; Hard $10,000	(Moldova) Radu Albot; 7–5, 6–3	(Colombia) Alejandro González	(Italy) Alessandro Giannessi (Croatia) Toni Androić	(Serbia) Miljan Zekić (Croatia) Dino Marcan (Serbia) Ivan Bjelica (Switzerland) Yann Marti
March 28	Turkey F11 Futures; Antalya, Turkey; Hard $10,000	(Croatia) Toni Androić (Croatia) Dino Marcan; 7–5, 6–2	(Serbia) Ivan Bjelica (Serbia) Miljan Zekić	(Italy) Alessandro Giannessi (Croatia) Toni Androić	(Serbia) Miljan Zekić (Croatia) Dino Marcan (Serbia) Ivan Bjelica (Switzerland) Yann Marti
March 28	USA F8 Futures; Oklahoma City, USA; Hard $15,000	(Spain) Arnau Brugués Davi; 6–4, 6–3	(Bulgaria) Dimitar Kutrovsky	(Serbia) Vladimir Obradović (Chinese Taipei) Jimmy Wang	(United Kingdom) Alex Bogdanovic (Georgia (country)) Nikoloz Basilashvili (United States) Greg Ouellette (Romania) Andrei Dăescu
March 28	USA F8 Futures; Oklahoma City, USA; Hard $15,000	(United States) Nicholas Monroe (Canada) Vasek Pospisil; 6–4, 6–3	(Australia) Carsten Ball (Australia) Chris Guccione	(Serbia) Vladimir Obradović (Chinese Taipei) Jimmy Wang	(United Kingdom) Alex Bogdanovic (Georgia (country)) Nikoloz Basilashvili (United States) Greg Ouellette (Romania) Andrei Dăescu

== See also ==
- 2011 ITF Men's Circuit
- 2011 ITF Men's Circuit (April–June)
- 2011 ITF Men's Circuit (July–September)
- 2011 ITF Men's Circuit (October–December)
- 2011 ATP World Tour
- 2011 ATP Challenger Tour
