= 2009 St. Petersburg Open – Doubles =

Doubles
- 2009 St. Petersburg Open

Final
- Champions: (United Kingdom) Colin Fleming (United Kingdom) Ken Skupski
- Runners-up: (France) Jérémy Chardy (France) Richard Gasquet
- Score: 2–6, 7–5, [10–4]

Events
Singles	Doubles
← 2008 ·	St. Petersburg Open	· 2010 →

Travis Parrott and Filip Polášek were the defending champions, but they chose to participate with different partners.

Parrott partnered up with Rohan Bopanna, but they lost in the first round against Colin Fleming and Ken Skupski, who eventually went on to beat Jérémy Chardy and Richard Gasquet in the final.

== Seeds ==
1. (Czech Republic) František Čermák/ (Slovakia) Michal Mertiňák (first round)
2. (Sweden) Johan Brunström / (Netherlands Antilles) Jean-Julien Rojer (first round)
3. (India) Rohan Bopanna / (United States) Travis Parrott (first round)
4. (United States) Scott Lipsky / (Netherlands) Rogier Wassen (first round)

== Draw ==
=== Key ===
- Q = Qualifier
- WC = Wild card
- LL = Lucky loser
- Alt = Alternate
- SE = Special exempt
- PR = Protected ranking
- ITF = ITF entry
- JE = Junior exempt
- w/o = Walkover
- r = Retired
- d = Defaulted
- SR = Special ranking

First round
1	(Czech Republic) F Čermák (Slovakia) M Mertiňák	3	6^{7}
(Israel) J Erlich (Israel) A Ram	6	7^{9}
(Russia) I Andreev (Russia) M Youzhny	6^{4}	6	[10]
WC	(Russia) P Chekhov (Russia) V Rudnev	7^{7}	4	[5]
3	(India) R Bopanna (United States) T Parrott	6^{5}	6	[7]
(United Kingdom) C Fleming (United Kingdom) K Skupski	7^{7}	3	[10]
(Russia) I Kunitsyn (Russia) M Safin	6^{6}	6	[8]
(Uruguay) P Cuevas (Argentina) H Zeballos	7^{8}	2	[10]
(Russia) E Korolev (Germany) F Moser	6^{5}	3
(United States) J Cerretani (Czech Republic) D Škoch	7^{7}	6
WC	(Russia) M Elgin (Russia) T Gabashvili	6	6
4	(United States) S Lipsky (Netherlands) R Wassen	3	4
(Slovakia) K Beck (Slovakia) F Polášek	2	6^{4}
(France) J Chardy (France) R Gasquet	6	7^{7}
(Czech Republic) L Friedl (Czech Republic) J Levinský	7^{9}	6^{7}	[11]
2	(Sweden) J Brunström (Netherlands Antilles) J-J Rojer	6^{7}	7^{9}	[9]

Quarterfinals
(Israel) J Erlich (Israel) A Ram	w/o
(Russia) I Andreev (Russia) M Youzhny
(United Kingdom) C Fleming (United Kingdom) K Skupski	7^{7}	6
(Uruguay) P Cuevas (Argentina) H Zeballos	6^{4}	4
(United States) J Cerretani (Czech Republic) D Škoch	3	2
WC	(Russia) M Elgin (Russia) T Gabashvili	6	6
(France) J Chardy (France) R Gasquet	7	6
(Czech Republic) L Friedl (Czech Republic) J Levinský	5	2

Semifinals
(Israel) J Erlich (Israel) A Ram	4	6	[6]
(United Kingdom) C Fleming (United Kingdom) K Skupski	6	3	[10]
WC	(Russia) M Elgin (Russia) T Gabashvili	6^{3}	1
(France) J Chardy (France) R Gasquet	7^{7}	6

Finals
(United Kingdom) C Fleming (United Kingdom) K Skupski	2	7	[10]
(France) J Chardy (France) R Gasquet	6	5	4
