= 2009 St. Petersburg Open – Singles =

Singles
- 2009 St. Petersburg Open

Final
- Champion: (Ukraine) Sergiy Stakhovsky
- Runner-up: (Argentina) Horacio Zeballos
- Score: 2–6, 7–6^{(10–8)}, 7–6^{(9–7)}

Events
Singles	Doubles
← 2008 ·	St. Petersburg Open	· 2010 →

Andy Murray was the defending champion, but he chose not to compete this year.

Sergiy Stakhovsky won in the final over Horacio Zeballos 2–6, 7–6^{(10–8)}, 7–6^{(9–7)}.

== Seeds ==
1. (Russia) Mikhail Youzhny (second round, retired because of a lower back injury)
2. (Romania) Victor Hănescu (quarterfinals)
3. (Serbia) Viktor Troicki (first round)
4. (France) Jérémy Chardy (second round)
5. (Russia) Igor Andreev (second round, retired because of a left knee injury)
6. (Russia) Evgeny Korolev (first round)
7. (Uruguay) Pablo Cuevas (first round)
8. (Argentina) Horacio Zeballos (final)

== Draw ==
=== Key ===
- Q = Qualifier
- WC = Wild card
- LL = Lucky loser
- Alt = Alternate
- SE = Special exempt
- PR = Protected ranking
- ITF = ITF entry
- JE = Junior exempt
- w/o = Walkover
- r = Retired
- d = Defaulted
- SR = Special ranking

=== Finals ===
Semifinals
(Russia) Marat Safin	4	6	4
Q	(Ukraine) Sergiy Stakhovsky	6	4	6
8	(Argentina) Horacio Zeballos	7^{9}	6
(Russia) Igor Kunitsyn	6^{7}	3

Final
Q	(Ukraine) Sergiy Stakhovsky	2	7^{10}	7^{9}
8	(Argentina) Horacio Zeballos	6	6^{8}	6^{7}

=== Top half ===
First round
1	(Russia) M Youzhny	6	6
(Kazakhstan) A Golubev	3	2
(Uzbekistan) D Istomin	6	6
(Germany) R Schüttler	4	4
(Russia) M Safin	7^{7}	6
(France) R Gasquet	6^{5}	4
(Italy) P Starace	4	2
5	(Russia) I Andreev	6	6
3	(Serbia) V Troicki	6^{4}	6	4
(Slovakia) K Beck	7^{7}	4	6
WC	(Russia) S Vovk	3	2
(Germany) B Phau	6	6
(Spain) M Granollers	7^{7}	6^{6}	4
WC	(Russia) A Kuznetsov	6^{4}	7^{8}	6
Q	(Ukraine) S Stakhovsky	6	6
6	(Russia) E Korolev	4	3

Second round
1	(Russia) M Youzhny	2	1^{r}
(Uzbekistan) D Istomin	6	2
(Russia) M Safin	6	0
5	(Russia) I Andreev	3	1^{r}
(Slovakia) K Beck	4	1^{r}
(Germany) B Phau	6	2
WC	(Russia) A Kuznetsov	1	4
Q	(Ukraine) S Stakhovsky	6	6

Quarterfinals
(Uzbekistan) D Istomin	0	6^{4}
(Russia) M Safin	6	7^{7}
(Germany) B Phau	2	5
Q	(Ukraine) S Stakhovsky	6	7

Semifinals
(Russia) M Safin	4	6	4
Q	(Ukraine) S Stakhovsky	6	4	6

=== Bottom half ===
First round
8	(Argentina) H Zeballos	7^{11}	6
Q	(Kazakhstan) Y Schukin	6^{9}	3
Q	(Ukraine) O Dolgopolov Jr.	6	1
(United States) R Ginepri	2	0^{r}
(Latvia) E Gulbis	6	7^{7}
(Germany) F Mayer	3	6^{3}
Q	(Romania) P-A Luncanu	2	2
4	(France) J Chardy	6	6
7	(Uruguay) P Cuevas	4	3
(Russia) I Kunitsyn	6	6
WC	(Russia) M Elgin	6	6
SE	(Kazakhstan) M Kukushkin	3	3
(Italy) F Fognini	4	1
SE	(Ukraine) I Marchenko	6	6
(Russia) T Gabashvili	1	2
2	(Romania) V Hănescu	6	6

Second round
8	(Argentina) H Zeballos	6	6
Q	(Ukraine) O Dolgopolov Jr.	3	1
(Latvia) E Gulbis	7^{9}	6
4	(France) J Chardy	6^{7}	3
(Russia) I Kunitsyn	6	6
WC	(Russia) M Elgin	2	3
SE	(Ukraine) I Marchenko	3	4
2	(Romania) V Hănescu	6	6

Quarterfinals
8	(Argentina) H Zeballos	7^{10}	6
(Latvia) E Gulbis	6^{8}	4
(Russia) I Kunitsyn	6	3	7^{8}
2	(Romania) V Hănescu	3	6	6^{6}

Semifinals
8	(Argentina) H Zeballos	7^{9}	6
(Russia) I Kunitsyn	6^{7}	3
