= 2008 St. Petersburg Open – Singles =

Singles
- 2008 St. Petersburg Open

Final
- Champion: (United Kingdom) Andy Murray
- Runner-up: (Kazakhstan) Andrey Golubev
- Score: 6–1, 6–1

Events
Singles	Doubles
← 2007 ·	St. Petersburg Open	· 2009 →

Andy Murray was the defending champion, and won in the final 6–1, 6–1, against Andrey Golubev.

== Seeds ==
1. (United Kingdom) Andy Murray (champion)
2. (Russia) Nikolay Davydenko (second round, withdrew due to a wrist injury)
3. (Spain) Fernando Verdasco (semifinals)
4. (Russia) Mikhail Youzhny (second round)
5. (Croatia) Marin Čilić (first round)
6. (Russia) Dmitry Tursunov (first round)
7. (Croatia) Mario Ančić (first round)
8. (Russia) Marat Safin (second round)

== Draw ==
=== Key ===
- Q = Qualifier
- WC = Wild card
- LL = Lucky loser
- Alt = Alternate
- SE = Special exempt
- PR = Protected ranking
- ITF = ITF entry
- JE = Junior exempt
- w/o = Walkover
- r = Retired
- d = Defaulted
- SR = Special ranking

=== Finals ===
Semifinals
1	(United Kingdom) Andy Murray	6	6
3	(Spain) Fernando Verdasco	0	3
Q	(Kazakhstan) Andrey Golubev	6	6
(Romania) Victor Hănescu	3	0

Final
1	(United Kingdom) Andy Murray	6	6
Q	(Kazakhstan) Andrey Golubev	1	1

=== Top half ===
First round
1	(United Kingdom) A Murray	6	6
(Serbia) V Troicki	3	3
(Spain) G García-López	0	2
(Latvia) E Gulbis	6	6
(Serbia) J Tipsarević	6	7^{7}
(Italy) P Starace	3	6^{4}
(France) J Chardy	6	3	6
7	(Croatia) M Ančić	4	6	4
3	(Spain) F Verdasco	1	6	6
Q	(Russia) T Gabashvili	6	4	3
WC	(Latvia) K Lejnieks	3	7^{7}	6
WC	(Russia) A Kudryavtsev	6	6^{1}	3
(Germany) R Schüttler	6	6
(Russia) I Kunitsyn	2	3
(Slovakia) D Hrbatý	6	6
6	(Russia) D Tursunov	1	1

Second round
1	(United Kingdom) A Murray	6	6
(Latvia) E Gulbis	4	2
(Serbia) J Tipsarević	6	7^{7}
(France) J Chardy	4	6^{3}
3	(Spain) F Verdasco	6	6
WC	(Latvia) K Lejnieks	1	3
(Germany) R Schüttler	6	6
(Slovakia) D Hrbatý	3	3

Quarterfinals
1	(United Kingdom) A Murray	7^{7}	7
(Serbia) J Tipsarević	6^{3}	5
3	(Spain) F Verdasco	7	6
(Germany) R Schüttler	5	2

Semifinals
1	(United Kingdom) A Murray	6	6
3	(Spain) F Verdasco	0	3

=== Bottom half ===
First round
8	(Russia) M Safin	6	6
(Ukraine) S Stakhovsky	2	4
Q	(Kazakhstan) A Golubev	6	6
(Belgium) O Rochus	1	4
Q	(Germany) M Zverev	6	6
(France) F Serra	4	2
(Spain) I Navarro	2	1
4	(Russia) M Youzhny	6	6
5	(Croatia) M Čilić	6^{4}	6	6^{6}
Q	(Kazakhstan) M Kukushkin	7^{7}	4	7^{8}
(Russia) E Korolev	1	2
(Romania) V Hănescu	6	6
WC	(Russia) M Elgin	6	6
(Italy) F Volandri	4	4
(Australia) C Guccione	4	4
2	(Russia) N Davydenko	6	6

Second round
8	(Russia) M Safin	4	2
Q	(Kazakhstan) A Golubev	6	6
Q	(Germany) M Zverev	7	6
4	(Russia) M Youzhny	5	4
Q	(Kazakhstan) M Kukushkin	3	6^{7}
(Romania) V Hănescu	6	7^{9}
WC	(Russia) M Elgin	w/o
2	(Russia) N Davydenko

Quarterfinals
Q	(Kazakhstan) A Golubev	6^{3}	6	7^{7}
Q	(Germany) M Zverev	7^{7}	4	6^{4}
(Romania) V Hănescu	6	6
WC	(Russia) M Elgin	1	4

Semifinals
Q	(Kazakhstan) A Golubev	6	6
(Romania) V Hănescu	3	0
