= 2011 ITF Men's Circuit =

2011 men's professional tennis circuit

Details

Achievements (singles)

The 2011 ITF Men's Circuit is the 2011 edition of the third-tier tour for men's professional tennis. It is organised by the International Tennis Federation and is a tier below the ATP Challenger Tour. The ITF Men's Circuit consists of 534 'Futures' tournaments played year round around the world.

== Statistical information ==
These tables present the number of singles (S) and doubles (D) titles won by each player and each nation during the season, within all the tournament categories of the 2011 ITF Futures tournaments. The players/nations are sorted by: 1) total number of titles (a doubles title won by two players representing the same nation counts as only one win for the nation); 2) a singles > doubles hierarchy; 3) alphabetical order (by family names for players).

To avoid confusion and double counting, these tables should be updated only after an event is completed.

Last updated on: 4 October 2011 (UTC).

=== Titles won by player ===
Total	Player	S	D
13	Toni Androic (CRO)	3	10
11	Denys Molchanov (UKR)	3	8
10	Joshua Goodall (GBR)	4	6
10	Nikola Cacic (SRB)	2	8
10	Dino Marcan (CRO)	2	8
10	(Germany) Steven Moneke	2	8
9	Li Zhe (CHN)	1	8
8	Arnau Brugués Davi (ESP)	8	0
8	Marcel Felder (URU)	5	3
8	Christopher Rungkat (INA)	3	5
8	Chris Eaton (GBR)	2	6
8	Gong Maoxin (CHN)	1	7
8	Lee Hsin-han (TPE)	0	8
8	David Rice (GBR)	0	8
7	Radu Albot (MDA)	5	2
7	James Lemke (AUS)	4	3
7	Hans Podlipnik Castillo (CHI)	2	5
7	Miguel Ángel López Jaén (ESP)	1	6
7	Brydan Klein (AUS)	0	7
7	Carles Poch-Gradin (ESP)	0	7
7	Divij Sharan (IND)	0	7
7	Sean Thornley (GBR)	0	7
7	Denis Zivkovic (USA)	0	7
6	Martín Alund (ARG)	4	2
6	Philipp Oswald (AUT)	4	2
6	Harri Heliövaara (FIN)	3	3
6	(Italy) Claudio Grassi	2	4
6	(Slovakia) Jozef Kovalík	2	4
6	Roman Jebavý (CZE)	1	5
6	Andis Juška (LAT)	1	5
6	Román Recarte (VEN)	1	5
6	Hsieh Cheng-peng (TPE)	0	6
6	André Miele (BRA)	0	6
6	Gabriel Trujillo Soler (ESP)	0	6
5	(France) Axel Michon	5	0
5	Gerard Granollers (ESP)	4	1
5	(France) Charles-Antoine Brézac	3	2
5	(France) Julien Obry	3	2
5	(Germany) Marc Sieber	3	2
5	Artem Smirnov (UKR)	3	2
5	Agustín Velotti (ARG)	3	2
5	Amir Weintraub (ISR)	3	2
5	(Argentina) Juan-Pablo Amado	2	3
5	(Serbia) Ivan Bjelica	2	3
5	Damir Džumhur (BIH)	2	3
5	Antal van der Duim (NED)	2	3
5	Vishnu Vardhan (IND)	2	3
5	Steven Diez (CAN)	1	4
5	Marc Fornell-Mestres (ESP)	1	4
5	(Argentina) Patricio Heras	1	4
5	Pierre-Hugues Herbert (FRA)	1	4
5	(Brazil) Tiago Lopes	1	4
5	Max Raditschnigg (AUT)	1	4
5	Weerapat Doakmaiklee (THA)	0	5
5	(Germany) Matthias Kolbe	0	5
5	Piero Luisi (VEN)	0	5
5	Fabrice Martin (FRA)	0	5
5	(Slovakia) Adrian Sikora	0	5
5	Maciek Sykut (USA)	0	5
5	Kittipong Wachiramanowong (THA)	0	5
4	James Duckworth (AUS)	4	0
4	Ádám Kellner (HUN)	4	0
4	(Austria) Michael Linzer	4	0
4	David Souto (VEN)	4	0
4	Maxime Authom (BEL)	3	1
4	Riccardo Bellotti (ITA)	3	1
4	Pablo Carreño Busta (ESP)	3	1
4	Marcin Gawron (POL)	3	1
4	Malek Jaziri (TUN)	3	1
4	Matteo Marrai (ITA)	3	1
4	Denis Matsukevitch (RUS)	3	1
4	Danai Udomchoke (THA)	3	1
4	Miljan Zekić (SRB)	3	1
4	Guido Andreozzi (ARG)	2	2
4	Guilherme Clézar (BRA)	2	2
4	(Russia) Ervand Gasparyan	2	2
4	(Belgium) Germain Gigounon	2	2
4	(Argentina) Gastón-Arturo Grimolizzi	2	2
4	Grzegorz Panfil (POL)	2	2
4	Goran Tošić (MNE)	2	2
4	Marcel Zimmermann (GER)	2	2
4	Duilio Beretta (PER)	1	3
4	Teodor-Dacian Craciun (ROU)	1	3
4	Rodrigo Guidolin (BRA)	1	3
4	(Austria) Marc Rath	1	3
4	John-Patrick Smith (AUS)	1	3
4	Luca Vanni (ITA)	1	3
4	(Argentina) Juan-Pablo Villar	1	3
4	(Spain) Iván Arenas-Gualda	0	4
4	Andrei Ciumac (MDA)	0	4
4	James Cluskey (IRL)	0	4
4	(Italy) Erik Crepaldi	0	4
4	Alejandro Fabbri (ARG)	0	4
4	(Russia) Mikhail Fufygin	0	4
4	(Australia) Chris Letcher	0	4
4	Haydn Lewis (BAR)	0	4
4	(Croatia) Ante Pavić	0	4
4	Deniss Pavlovs (LAT)	0	4
4	Dane Propoggia (AUS)	0	4
4	Yi Chu-huan (TPE)	0	4
3	Facundo Argüello (ARG)	3	0
3	Andre Begemann (GER)	3	0
3	Pedro Clar Rosselló (ESP)	3	0
3	Ricardo Hocevar (BRA)	3	0
3	Daniel Köllerer (AUT)	3	0
3	Dušan Lajović (SRB)	3	0
3	Jesse Levine (USA)	3	0
3	Yannick Mertens (BEL)	3	0
3	Mathieu Rodrigues (FRA)	3	0
3	Patrik Rosenholm (SWE)	3	0
3	(Germany) Stefan Seifert	3	0
3	Eduardo Struvay (COL)	3	0
3	Roman Borvanov (MDA)	2	1
3	Roberto Carballes (ESP)	2	1
3	Chen Ti (TPE)	2	1
3	Andrea Collarini (USA)	2	1
3	Daniel Garza (MEX)	2	1
3	Alessandro Giannessi (ITA)	2	1
3	Daniele Giorgini (ITA)	2	1
3	Kim Young-jun (KOR)	2	1
3	Javier Martí (ESP)	2	1
3	Matwé Middelkoop (NED)	2	1
3	Andrés Molteni (ARG)	2	1
3	Gabriel Moraru (ROU)	2	1
3	(Brazil) Fabiano de Paula	2	1
3	(Czech Republic) Marek Michalička	2	1
3	Vasek Pospisil (CAN)	2	1
3	Matt Reid (AUS)	2	1
3	Tennys Sandgren (USA)	2	1
3	(Italy) Riccardo Sinicropi	2	1
3	Blake Strode (USA)	2	1
3	(Italy) Stefano Travaglia	2	1
3	Carl Bergman (SWE)	1	2
3	(Germany) Dennis Blömke	1	2
3	(Argentina) Guillermo Carry	1	2
3	Iñigo Cervantes Huegun (ESP)	1	2
3	Kamil Čapkovič (SVK)	1	2
3	Luis Díaz Barriga (MEX)	1	2
3	(Australia) Isaac Frost	1	2
3	Rohan Gajjar (IND)	1	2
3	(Czech Republic) Michal Konečný	1	2
3	Kevin Krawietz (GER)	1	2
3	(Brazil) Diego Matos	1	2
3	Gerald Melzer (AUT)	1	2
3	Gianni Mina (FRA)	1	2
3	(Japan) Takuto Niki	1	2
3	John Peers (AUS)	1	2
3	(United Kingdom) Morgan Phillips	1	2
3	Ruan Roelofse (RSA)	1	2
3	(Czech Republic) Jan Šátral	1	2
3	Caio Zampieri (BRA)	1	2
3	(Italy) Francesco Borgo	0	3
3	Alexander Bury (BLR)	0	3
3	(Italy) Marco Cecchinato	0	3
3	(Brazil) Danilo Ferraz	0	3
3	Sergio Galdós (PER)	0	3
3	Mislav Hižak (CRO)	0	3
3	Andriej Kapaś (POL)	0	3
3	(Netherlands) Wesley Koolhof	0	3
3	(Spain) Enrique López Pérez	0	3
3	(Spain) Rafael Mazón-Hernández	0	3
3	Iván Miranda (PER)	0	3
3	(Australia) Brendan Moore	0	3
3	Nikolaus Moser (AUT)	0	3
3	Albano Olivetti (FRA)	0	3
3	(Spain) Jaime Pulgar-García	0	3
3	Nicolas Renavand (FRA)	0	3
3	(Russia) Vitali Reshetnikov	0	3
3	(United States) Benjamin Rogers	0	3
3	(Russia) Alexander Rumyantsev	0	3
3	(Czech Republic) Michal Schmid	0	3
3	(Argentina) Gustavo Sterin	0	3
3	(Netherlands) Tim van Terheijden	0	3
3	Andrei Vasilevski (BLR)	0	3
3	(Russia) Mikhail Vasiliev	0	3
3	Michael Venus (NZL)	0	3
3	Mike Vermeer (LUX)	0	3
3	Roman Vögeli (CZE)	0	3
3	Stanislav Vovk (RUS)	0	3
3	(Austria) Tristan-Samuel Weiβborn	0	3
3	(United States) Joshua Zavala	0	3
2	Johannes Ager (AUT)	2	0
2	Andrés Artuñedo (ESP)	2	0
2	Nicolas Devilder (FRA)	2	0
2	Ervin Eleskovic (SWE)	2	0
2	Gastão Elias (POR)	2	0
2	(Spain) David Estruch	2	0
2	(Germany) Holger Fischer	2	0
2	(Italy) Federico Gaio	2	0
2	Miguel Gallardo-Vallés (MEX)	2	0
2	Stefano Galvani (ITA)	2	0
2	Marc Gicquel (FRA)	2	0
2	Andrey Kumantsov (RUS)	2	0
2	Im Kyu-tae (KOR)	2	0
2	Steve Johnson (USA)	2	0
2	Dušan Lojda (CZE)	2	0
2	Petru-Alexandru Luncanu (ROU)	2	0
2	Jan Mertl (CZE)	2	0
2	Kristijan Mesaroš (CRO)	2	0
2	Benjamin Mitchell (AUS)	2	0
2	(Japan) Junn Mitsuhashi	2	0
2	Timo Nieminen (FIN)	2	0
2	Wayne Odesnik (USA)	2	0
2	Guillermo Olaso (ESP)	2	0
2	Karan Rastogi (IND)	2	0
2	Valery Rudnev (RUS)	2	0
2	Guillaume Rufin (FRA)	2	0
2	(Spain) Jordi Samper Montaña	2	0
2	João Sousa (POR)	2	0
2	Cedrik-Marcel Stebe (GER)	2	0
2	Peter Torebko (GER)	2	0
2	Boy Westerhof (NED)	2	0
2	Zhang Ze (CHN)	2	0
2	Juan-Martín Aranguren (ARG)	1	1
2	Tomislav Brkić (BIH)	1	1
2	Grégoire Burquier (FRA)	1	1
2	Kenny de Schepper (FRA)	1	1
2	Christopher Díaz Figueroa (GUA)	1	1
2	Sandro Ehrat (SUI)	1	1
2	(Argentina) Maximiliano Estévez	1	1
2	Jonathan Eysseric (FRA)	1	1
2	Pablo Galdón (ARG)	1	1
2	Riccardo Ghedin (ITA)	1	1
2	André Ghem (BRA)	1	1
2	(Spain) Marc Giner	1	1
2	(Slovakia) Norbert Gomboš	1	1
2	(Australia) Dayne Kelly	1	1
2	Leonardo Kirche (BRA)	1	1
2	Raven Klaasen (RSA)	1	1
2	(Australia) Michael Look	1	1
2	(India) Saketh Myneni	1	1
2	(Argentina) Leandro Migani	1	1
2	Nicholas Monroe (USA)	1	1
2	George Morgan (GBR)	1	1
2	Guido Pella (ARG)	1	1
2	José Pereira (BRA)	1	1
2	Peter Polansky (CAN)	1	1
2	César Ramírez (MEX)	1	1
2	(Belgium) Yannik Reuter	1	1
2	Cristóbal Saavedra-Corvalán (CHI)	1	1
2	(France) Gleb Sakharov	1	1
2	(India) Karunuday Singh	1	1
2	Jimmy Wang (TPE)	1	1
2	Rhyne Williams (USA)	1	1
2	Francesco Aldi (ITA)	0	2
2	Tuna Altuna (TUR)	0	2
2	Diego Álvarez (ARG)	0	2
2	(South Africa) Jean Andersen	0	2
2	Marcelo Arévalo (ESA)	0	2
2	(New Zealand) Marvin Barker	0	2
2	Sam Barry (IRE)	0	2
2	Ariel Behar (URU)	0	2
2	Devin Britton (USA)	0	2
2	Patrik Brydolf (SWE)	0	2
2	(Argentina) Guillermo Bujniewicz	0	2
2	(Spain) Carlos Calderón-Rodríguez	0	2
2	(Romania) Alexandru-Daniel Carpen	0	2
2	Raony Carvalho (BRA)	0	2
2	Adam Chadaj (POL)	0	2
2	Érik Chvojka (CAN)	0	2
2	Marcus Daniell (NZL)	0	2
2	Daniel Danilovic (SWE)	0	2
2	(Netherlands) David de Goede	0	2
2	Marin Draganja (CRO)	0	2
2	(Argentina) Guillermo Durán	0	2
2	(Sweden) Markus Eriksson	0	2
2	Nikolai Fidirko (BLR)	0	2
2	(Argentina) Valentin Florez	0	2
2	John Paul Fruttero (USA)	0	2
2	Paris Gemouchidis (GRE)	0	2
2	(Italy) Nicola Ghedin	0	2
2	Ruben Gonzales (PHI)	0	2
2	Sergio Gutiérrez-Ferrol (ESP)	0	2
2	Stefano Ianni (ITA)	0	2
2	(Italy) Enrico Iannuzzi	0	2
2	Alexandros Jakupovic (GRE)	0	2
2	Romain Jouan (FRA)	0	2
2	Darian King (BAR)	0	2
2	Hiroki Kondo (JPN)	0	2
2	Błażej Koniusz (POL)	0	2
2	(United States) Chris Kwon	0	2
2	(France) Alexandre Lacroix	0	2
2	Nils Langer (GER)	0	2
2	(Czech Republic) Ľubomír Majšajdr	0	2
2	Roberto Maytín (VEN)	0	2
2	Nicolas Meister (USA)	0	2
2	(Argentina) Joaquín-Jesús Monteferrario	0	2
2	Maximilian Neuchrist (AUT)	0	2
2	(Netherlands) Miliaan Niesten	0	2
2	(United States) Greg Ouellette	0	2
2	Mate Pavić (CRO)	0	2
2	Alexander Pavlioutchenkov (RUS)	0	2
2	(Slovakia) Michal Pažický	0	2
2	(Chile) Rodrigo Perez	0	2
2	Roberto Quiroz (ECU)	0	2
2	(France) Laurent Rochette	0	2
2	Alex Satschko (GER)	0	2
2	(Argentina) Diego Schwartzman	0	2
2	Bruno Semenzato (BRA)	0	2
2	Artem Sitak (NZL)	0	2
2	(United Kingdom) Neal Skupski	0	2
2	(United Kingdom) Daniel Smethurst	0	2
2	(Netherlands) Lennert van der Linden	0	2
2	Fernando Vicente (ESP)	0	2
2	(United Kingdom) Marcus Willis	0	2
2	(Austria) Herbert Wiltschnig	0	2
1	Jorge Aguilar (CHI)	1	0
1	Thiago Alves (BRA)	1	0
1	Brian Baker (USA)	1	0
1	Jamie Baker (GBR)	1	0
1	Attila Balázs (HUN)	1	0
1	Mirza Bašić (BIH)	1	0
1	(Germany) Richard Becker	1	0
1	Bassam Beidas (LIB)	1	0
1	(France) Constantin Belot	1	0
1	Ilya Belyaev (RUS)	1	0
1	Philip Bester (CAN)	1	0
1	Yuki Bhambri (IND)	1	0
1	Richard Bloomfield (GBR)	1	0
1	Alex Bogdanovic (GBR)	1	0
1	(Italy) Enrico Burzi	1	0
1	(France) Rudy Coco	1	0
1	Ignacio Coll-Riudavets (ESP)	1	0
1	Jonathan Dasnières de Veigy (FRA)	1	0
1	Evgeny Donskoy (RUS)	1	0
1	(France) Baptiste Dupuy	1	0
1	Víctor Estrella (DOM)	1	0
1	(Japan) Hiroyasu Ehara	1	0
1	Thomas Fabbiano (ITA)	1	0
1	Alejandro González (COL)	1	0
1	Luka Gregorc (SVN)	1	0
1	Laurynas Grigelis (LTU)	1	0
1	Victor Ioniță (ROU)	1	0
1	Evgeny Kirillov (RUS)	1	0
1	(Argentina) Kevin Konfederak	1	0
1	Daniel Kosakowski (USA)	1	0
1	Denis Kudla (USA)	1	0
1	Andrey Kuznetsov (RUS)	1	0
1	Michael Lammer (SUI)	1	0
1	(Germany) Marko Lenz	1	0
1	Lim Yong-kyu (KOR)	1	0
1	Dénes Lukács (HUN)	1	0
1	James McGee (IRL)	1	0
1	Nikola Mektić (CRO)	1	0
1	(Romania) Andrei Mlendea	1	0
1	Hiroki Moriya (JPN)	1	0
1	(India) Jeevan Nedunchezhiyan	1	0
1	(Argentina) Juan Pablo Ortiz	1	0
1	(Mexico) Eduardo Peralta-Tello	1	0
1	(Austria) Nicolas Reißig	1	0
1	Michael Ryderstedt (SWE)	1	0
1	Răzvan Sabău (ROU)	1	0
1	Nicolás Santos (BRA)	1	0
1	Júlio Silva (BRA)	1	0
1	Phillip Simmonds (USA)	1	1
1	Jan-Lennard Struff (GER)	1	0
1	Maxime Teixeira (FRA)	1	0
1	Matteo Trevisan (ITA)	1	0
1	Marco Trungelliti (ARG)	1	0
1	Yang Tsung-hua (TPE)	1	0
1	(Argentina) Juan-Manuel Valverde	1	0
1	Nick van der Meer (NED)	1	0
1	Jiří Veselý (CZE)	1	0
1	Matteo Viola (ITA)	1	0
1	(United Kingdom) Alexander Ward	1	0
1	Wu Di (CHN)	1	0
1	Daniel Yoo (KOR)	1	0
1	Mehdi Ziadi (MAR)	1	0
1	Jürgen Zopp (EST)	1	0
1	Guillermo Alcaide (ESP)	0	1
1	(Ukraine) Gleb Alekseenko	0	1
1	An Jae-sung (KOR)	0	1
1	Victor Anagnastopol (ROU)	0	1
1	Boris Arias (BOL)	0	1
1	(United States) Vahe Assadourian	0	1
1	(Bulgaria) Boris Nicola Bakalov	0	1
1	Victor Baluda (RUS)	0	1
1	Sekou Bangoura (USA)	0	1
1	Kornél Bardóczky (HUN)	0	1
1	(Colombia) Nicolás Barrientos	0	1
1	(Argentina) Cristián Benedetti	0	1
1	Sergey Betov (BLR)	0	1
1	(Spain) Agustín Boje-Ordóñez	0	1
1	Adrien Bossel (SUI)	0	1
1	Liam Broady (GBR)	0	1
1	(Netherlands) Bart Brons	0	1
1	(Sweden) Jesper Brunström	0	1
1	(Spain) Óscar Burrieza	0	1
1	(United Kingdom) Lewis Burton	0	1
1	(Spain) José Checa Calvo	0	1
1	(South Korea) Cho Soong-jae	0	1
1	(Italy) Matteo Civarolo	0	1
1	(Serbia) Boris Čonkić	0	1
1	Adrian Cruciat (ROU)	0	1
1	Martín Cuevas (URU)	0	1
1	(Spain) Arnau Dachs	0	1
1	Jeff Dadamo (USA)	0	1
1	(Romania) Andrei Dăescu	0	1
1	(Slovakia) Marko Danis	0	1
1	(Italy) Davide della Tommasina	0	1
1	Hugo Dellien (BOL)	0	1
1	Marcelo Demoliner (BRA)	0	1
1	(Belgium) Julien Dubail	0	1
1	(France) Florent Diep	0	1
1	(Germany) Maximilian Dinslaken	0	1
1	(Brazil) Eduardo Dischinger	0	1
1	Mauricio Doria-Medina (BOL)	0	1
1	Maxim Dubarenco (MDA)	0	1
1	(France) Loïc Ducourau	0	1
1	(Australia) Jared Easton	0	1
1	Mauricio Echazú (PER)	0	1
1	Martin Emmrich (GER)	0	1
1	Iván Endara (ECU)	0	1
1	(Israel) Tal Eros	0	1
1	(Switzerland) Joss Espasandin	0	1
1	Daniel Evans (GBR)	0	1
1	(Germany) Florian Fallert	0	1
1	(United Kingdom) James Feaver	0	1
1	Franco Ferreiro (BRA)	0	1
1	(Italy) Enrico Fioravante	0	1
1	Ashley Fisher (AUS)	0	1
1	(Croatia) Marin Franjičević	0	1
1	(Netherlands) Stephan Fransen	0	1
1	(Australia) Leon Frost	0	1
1	(Poland) Piotr Gadomski	0	1
1	Diego Galeano (PAR)	0	1
1	Takanyi Garanganga (ZIM)	0	1
1	(Republic of Ireland) Daniel Glancy	0	1
1	Oliver Golding (GBR)	0	1
1	Juan Sebastián Gómez (COL)	0	1
1	(Argentina) Jonathan Gonzalia	0	1
1	Ismar Gorčić (BIH)	0	1
1	Rodrigo Grilli (BRA)	0	1
1	Chris Haggard (RSA)	0	1
1	(Argentina) Gabriel Hidalgo	0	1
1	(Mexico) Javier Herrera-Eguiluz	0	1
1	Guillermo Hormazábal (CHI)	0	1
1	Huang Liang-chi (TPE)	0	1
1	(Finland) Sami Huurinainen	0	1
1	(France) Yannick Jankovits	0	1
1	(Slovenia) Rok Jarc	0	1
1	(Austria) Lukas Jastraunig	0	1
1	Rameez Junaid (AUS)	0	1
1	Sadik Kadir (AUS)	0	1
1	Alexey Kedryuk (KAZ)	0	1
1	(Croatia) Duje Kekež	0	1
1	(Russia) Stepan Khotulev	0	1
1	Kim Hyun-joon (KOR)	0	1
1	Barry King (IRL)	0	1
1	Bastian Knittel (GER)	0	1
1	(Slovenia) Tom Kočevar-Dešman	0	1
1	Mateusz Kowalczyk (POL)	0	1
1	Andrej Kračman (SVN)	0	1
1	Austin Krajicek (USA)	0	1
1	Gero Kretschmer (GER)	0	1
1	(Russia) Sergei Krotiouk	0	1
1	Dimitar Kutrovsky (BUL)	0	1
1	(Austria) Philip Lang	0	1
1	(Spain) Juan José Leal-Gómez	0	1
1	(Russia) Andrei Levine	0	1
1	Christian Lindell (SWE)	0	1
1	(Spain) Juan Lizariturry	0	1
1	Alex Llompart (PUR)	0	1
1	Daniel-Alejandro López (PAR)	0	1
1	(France) Dimitri Lorin	0	1
1	Jannick Lupescu (NED)	0	1
1	(France) Julien Maes	0	1
1	(United Kingdom) Jarryd Maher	0	1
1	(Bolivia) Ryusei Makiguchi	0	1
1	Pablo Martín-Adalia (ESP)	0	1
1	(Netherlands) Alban Meuffels	0	1
1	Mohd Assri Merzuki (MAS)	0	1
1	Florin Mergea (ROU)	0	1
1	(Italy) Giammarco Micolani	0	1
1	(United Kingdom) Joshua Milton	0	1
1	(Russia) Richard Muzaev	0	1
1	Nikolai Nesterov (RUS)	0	1
1	Renzo Olivo (ARG)	0	1
1	(Japan) Arata Onozawa	0	1
1	(Netherlands) Roel Oostdam	0	1
1	Juho Paukku (FIN)	0	1
1	(France) Alexandre Penaud	0	1
1	(Australia) Allen Perel	0	1
1	(Canada) Milan Pokrajac	0	1
1	(Ukraine) Stanislav Poplavskyy	0	1
1	(Italy) Giorgio Portaluri	0	1
1	(India) N. Vijay Sundar Prashanth	0	1
1	Filip Prpic (SWE)	0	1
1	(Germany) Tim Pütz	0	1
1	(China) Qi Xiao	0	1
1	Purav Raja (IND)	0	1
1	(India) Arun-Prakash Rajagopalan	0	1
1	(India) Ramkumar Ramanathan	0	1
1	(Bosnia and Herzegovina) Franjo Raspudić	0	1
1	(Germany) Luis Rattenhuber	0	1
1	Miguel Ángel Reyes-Varela (MEX)	0	1
1	(France) Florian Reynet	0	1
1	(Colombia) Cristián Rodríguez	0	1
1	(Spain) Borja Rodriguez-Manzano	0	1
1	Marvin Rolle (BAH)	0	1
1	(Australia) Nima Roshan	0	1
1	(Austria) Richard Ruckelshausen	0	1
1	Antonio Ruiz-Rosales (MEX)	0	1
1	(Finland) Jesper Saarni	0	1
1	(Spain) Óscar Sabaté-Bretos	0	1
1	Manuel Sánchez (MEX)	0	1
1	Antonio Sančić (CRO)	0	1
1	Bruno Sant'anna (BRA)	0	1
1	Pablo Santos (ESP)	0	1
1	(Japan) Bumpei Sato	0	1
1	David Savić (SRB)	0	1
1	(Argentina) Rodrigo Scattareggia	0	1
1	Nikala Scholtz (RSA)	0	1
1	Karue Sell (BRA)	0	1
1	Alexandre Sidorenko (FRA)	0	1
1	(Brazil) Ricardo Siggia	0	1
1	(Brazil) Caio Silva	0	1
1	Sanam Singh (IND)	0	1
1	Alexander Slabinsky (GBR)	0	1
1	(Poland) Maciej Smoła	0	1
1	Jack Sock (USA)	0	1
1	(Italy) Marco Speronello	0	1
1	(Netherlands) Xander Spong	0	1
1	Simon Stadler (GER)	0	1
1	(Russia) Ilia Starkov	0	1
1	(Germany) Peter Steinberger	0	1
1	(France) Malte Stropp	0	1
1	(France) Vincent Stouff	0	1
1	Aldin Šetkić (BIH)	0	1
1	Marcio Torres (BRA)	0	1
1	Walter Trusendi (ITA)	0	1
1	Yasutaka Uchiyama (JPN)	0	1
1	Vaja Uzakov (UZB)	0	1
1	Simone Vagnozzi (ITA)	0	1
1	(Netherlands) Omar van Welzenis	0	1
1	(Argentina) Juan Vázquez-Valenzuela	0	1
1	Dušan Vemić (SRB)	0	1
1	(Australia) Mark Verryth	0	1
1	(Netherlands) Mark Vervoort	0	1
1	Andoni Vivanco-Guzmán (ESP)	0	1
1	Juan-Sebastian Vivanco (ECU)	0	1
1	(Italy) Matteo Volante	0	1
1	(China) Wang Yingzheng	0	1
1	Federico Zeballos (BOL)	0	1
1	(Australia) Marious Zelba	0	1

=== Titles won by nation ===
Total	Nation	S	D
74	Spain (ESP)	36	38
63	Argentina (ARG)	30	33
55	France (FRA)	30	25
53	Italy (ITA)	26	27
47	United States (USA)	19	28
46	Australia (AUS)	17	29
43	Germany (GER)	24	19
40	Brazil (BRA)	17	23
37	Great Britain (GBR)	12	25
33	Austria (AUT)	17	16
32	Russia (RUS)	13	19
30	Croatia (CRO)	8	22
24	Czech Republic (CZE)	10	14
22	Serbia (SRB)	10	12
22	Netherlands (NED)	7	15
25	India (IND)	10	15
18	Chinese Taipei (TPE)	4	14
16	Sweden (SWE)	7	9
15	Romania (ROU)	8	7
15	Ukraine (UKR)	6	9
15	Slovakia (SVK)	4	11
14	Moldova (MDA)	7	7
14	China (CHN)	5	9
13	Belgium (BEL)	9	4
13	Mexico (MEX)	7	6
13	Canada (CAN)	5	8
12	Poland (POL)	5	7
12	Venezuela (VEN)	5	7
12	Chile (CHI)	4	8
11	Japan (JPN)	5	6
10	Finland (FIN)	5	5
10	Uruguay (URU)	5	5
10	Thailand (THA)	3	7
9	Bosnia and Herzegovina (BIH)	4	5
9	Peru (PER)	1	8
8	South Korea (KOR)	6	2
8	Indonesia (INA)	3	5
8	South Africa (RSA)	2	6
7	Hungary (HUN)	6	1
7	Colombia (COL)	4	3
7	Ireland (IRL)	1	6
7	Latvia (LAT)	1	6
7	New Zealand (NZL)	0	7
5	Israel (ISR)	3	2
5	Switzerland (SUI)	2	3
5	Belarus (BLR)	0	5
4	Portugal (POR)	4	0
4	Tunisia (TUN)	3	1
4	Montenegro (MNE)	2	2
4	Barbados (BAR)	0	4
4	Bolivia (BOL)	0	4
3	Slovenia (SVN)	1	2
3	Ecuador (ECU)	0	3
3	Luxembourg (LUX)	0	3
2	Guatemala (GUA)	1	1
2	Bulgaria (BUL)	0	2
2	El Salvador (ESA)	0	2
2	Greece (GRE)	0	2
2	Philippines (PHI)	0	2
2	Turkey (TUR)	0	2
1	Dominican Republic (DOM)	1	0
1	Estonia (EST)	1	0
1	Lebanon (LIB)	1	0
1	Lithuania (LTU)	1	0
1	Morocco (MAR)	1	0
1	Bahamas (BAH)	0	1
1	Kazakhstan (KAZ)	0	1
1	Malaysia (MAS)	0	1
1	Paraguay (PAR)	0	1
1	Puerto Rico (PUR)	0	1
1	Uzbekistan (UZB)	0	1
1	Zimbabwe (ZIM)	0	1

== Point distribution ==
Points are awarded as follows:

Tournament Category	W	F	SF	QF	R16	R32	Q
Futures 15,000+H	35	20	10	4	1	0	0
Futures 15,000	27	15	8	3	1	0	0
Futures 10,000	18	10	6	2	1	0	0
