= 2009 St. Petersburg Open =

- Date: 25 October – 1 November
- Edition: 15th
- Category: ATP World Tour 250 Series
- Draw: 32S / 16D
- Prize money: $663,750
- Surface: Hard / indoor
- Location: St. Petersburg, Russia
- Venue: Petersburg Sports and Concert Complex

Champions

Singles
- (Ukraine) Sergiy Stakhovsky

Doubles
- (United Kingdom) Colin Fleming / (United Kingdom) Ken Skupski
← 2008 ·	St. Petersburg Open	· 2010 →

The 2009 St. Petersburg Open was a tennis tournament played on indoor hard courts. It was the 15th edition of the St. Petersburg Open, and was part of the ATP World Tour 250 Series of the 2009 ATP World Tour. It was held at the Petersburg Sports and Concert Complex in Saint Petersburg, Russia, from October 25 through November 1, 2009.

== ATP entrants ==
=== Seeds ===
Country	Player	Rank^{1}	Seed
RUS	Mikhail Youzhny	30	1
ROU	Victor Hănescu	31	2
SRB	Victor Troicki	32	3
FRA	Jérémy Chardy	36	4
RUS	Igor Andreev	41	5
RUS	Evgeny Korolev	51	6
URU	Pablo Cuevas	52	7
ARG	Horacio Zeballos	54	8

- Seeds are based on the rankings of October 19, 2009

=== Other entrants ===
The following players received wildcards into the singles main draw:

- (Russia) Stanislav Vovk
- (Russia) Andrey Kuznetsov
- (Russia) Michail Elgin

The following players received into the singles main draw as special exempt:

- (Kazakhstan) Mikhail Kukushkin
- (Ukraine) Illya Marchenko

The following players received entry from the qualifying draw:

- (Ukraine) Oleksandr Dolgopolov Jr.
- (Romania) Petru-Alexandru Luncanu
- (Kazakhstan) Yuri Schukin
- (Ukraine) Sergiy Stakhovsky

== Finals ==
=== Singles ===
(Ukraine) Sergiy Stakhovsky defeated (Argentina) Horacio Zeballos 2–6, 7–6^{(10–8)}, 7–6^{(9–7)}

- Stakhovsky wins his first title of the year and second of his career.

=== Doubles ===
(United Kingdom) Colin Fleming / (United Kingdom) Ken Skupski defeated (France) Jérémy Chardy / (France) Richard Gasquet, 2–6, 7–5, [10–4]
