= 2008 St. Petersburg Open – Doubles =

Doubles
- 2008 St. Petersburg Open

Final
- Champions: (United States) Travis Parrott (Slovakia) Filip Polášek
- Runners-up: (India) Rohan Bopanna (Belarus) Max Mirnyi
- Score: 3–6, 7–6^{(7–4)}, [10–8]

Events
Singles	Doubles
- St. Petersburg Open

Daniel Nestor and Nenad Zimonjić were the defending champions, but chose not to participate that year.

Travis Parrott and Filip Polášek won in the final 3–6, 7–6^{(7–4)}, [10–8], against Rohan Bopanna and Max Mirnyi.

== Seeds ==
1. (Sweden) Simon Aspelin / (Austria) Julian Knowle (quarterfinals)
2. (Czech Republic) Martin Damm / (Czech Republic) Pavel Vízner (first round)
3. (Russia) Mikhail Youzhny / (Germany) Mischa Zverev (first round)
4. (United States) Eric Butorac / (Czech Republic) František Čermák (quarterfinals)

== Draw ==
Key

- Q = Qualifier
- WC = Wild card
- LL = Lucky loser
- Alt = Alternate
- ITF = ITF entry
- PR = Protected ranking
- SR = Special ranking
- SE = Special exempt
- JE = Junior exempt
- JR = Junior Accelerator Programme entrant
- CO = College Accelerator Programme entrant
- NG = Next Gen Accelerator Program entrant
- w/o = Walkover
- r = Retired
- d = Defaulted

=== Draw ===
First round
1	(Sweden) S Aspelin (Austria) J Knowle	6	6
(Russia) T Gabashvili (Slovakia) D Hrbatý	1	4
(United States) J Cerretani (Czech Republic) J Levinský	2	2
WC	(Russia) M Elgin (Russia) A Kudryavtsev	6	6
4	(United States) E Butorac (Czech Republic) F Čermák	6	6
(United Kingdom) J Delgado (United Kingdom) A Murray	0	4
WC	(Israel) H Levy (Israel) N Okun	6^{5}	4
(United States) T Parrott (Slovakia) F Polášek	7^{7}	6
(Russia) I Kunitsyn (Russia) M Safin	6	2	[11]
(Pakistan) A-u-H Qureshi (Netherlands) R Wassen	3	6	[9]
(India) R Bopanna (Belarus) M Mirnyi	6	6
3	(Russia) M Youzhny (Germany) M Zverev	3	4
(Germany) M Kohlmann (Ukraine) S Stakhovsky	4	7	[10]
(Serbia) J Tipsarević (Serbia) V Troicki	6	5	[4]
(Slovakia) M Mertiňák (Croatia) L Zovko	6	3	[10]
2	(Czech Republic) M Damm (Czech Republic) P Vízner	4	6	[5]

Quarterfinals
1	(Sweden) S Aspelin (Austria) J Knowle	7^{7}	3	[9]
WC	(Russia) M Elgin (Russia) A Kudryavtsev	6^{3}	6	[11]
4	(United States) E Butorac (Czech Republic) F Čermák	5	3
(United States) T Parrott (Slovakia) F Polášek	7	6
(Russia) I Kunitsyn (Russia) M Safin	4	6	[11]
(India) R Bopanna (Belarus) M Mirnyi	6	3	[13]
(Germany) M Kohlmann (Ukraine) S Stakhovsky	2	6	[7]
(Slovakia) M Mertiňák (Croatia) L Zovko	6	3	[10]

Semifinals
WC	(Russia) M Elgin (Russia) A Kudryavtsev	5	6	[6]
(United States) T Parrott (Slovakia) F Polášek	7	4	[10]
(India) R Bopanna (Belarus) M Mirnyi	7	6
(Slovakia) M Mertiňák (Croatia) L Zovko	5	2

Final
(United States) T Parrott (Slovakia) F Polášek	3	7^{7}	[10]
(India) R Bopanna (Belarus) M Mirnyi	6	6^{4}	[8]
