= Kārlis Lejnieks =

Latvian tennis player

- Country (sports): Latvia
- Residence: Latvia
- Born: March 16, 1988 (age 37); Latvian SSR
- Prize money: 27,458 USD

Singles
- Career record: 2–5
- Highest ranking: 492

Doubles
- Career record: 0–0
- Highest ranking: 1020
- Last updated on: October 27, 2008.

Kārlis Lejnieks (born March 16, 1988) is a retired Latvian tennis player, who now pursues an interest in coaching. Through his career Lejnieks has won one Futures doubles title and has one runner-up in singles.

Lejnieks made his ATP debut in 2008 St. Petersburg Open where he defeated Russian Alexandre Kudryavtsev in the first round. In the second round he lost to Nr.3 seed Fernando Verdasco. After the tournament he reached a career-high 347 position in the ATP rating. He retired at the age of 23 years on June 27, 2011, stating that lack of motivation and previous injuries forced him to do so.

From 2006 to 2011 he played in the Latvian Davis Cup team.

== Career Finals ==
=== Singles ===
==== Runners-up ====
No.	Date	Tournament	Surface	Opponent in the final	Score
1.	April 14, 2008	Spain F15	Hard	(Germany) Gero Kretschmer	4–6, 7–5, 5–7

=== Doubles ===
==== Wins ====
No.	Date	Tournament	Surface	Partnering	Opponents in the final	Score
1.	May 5, 2008	Greece F1	Hard	(Montenegro) Daniel Danilović	(Australia) Isaac Frost (Australia) Leon Frost	4–6, 6–3, [10–8]
