= 2008 St. Petersburg Open =

- Date: 20–26 October
- Edition: 14th
- Category: International Series
- Draw: 32Q / 32S / 16D
- Prize money: $1,024,000
- Surface: Hard / indoor
- Location: St. Petersburg, Russia
- Venue: Petersburg Sports and Concert Complex

Champions

Singles
- (United Kingdom) Andy Murray

Doubles
- (United States) Travis Parrott / (Slovakia) Filip Polášek
← 2007 ·	St. Petersburg Open	· 2009 →

The 2008 St. Petersburg Open was a tennis tournament played on indoor hard courts. It was the 14th edition of the St. Petersburg Open, and was part of the International Series of the 2008 ATP Tour. It took place at the Petersburg Sports and Concert Complex in Saint Petersburg, Russia, from October 20 through October 26, 2008.

The singles draw was headlined by ATP No. 4, US Open runner-up, Cincinnati and Madrid Masters, Doha and Marseille winner, St. Petersburg defending champion Andy Murray, Miami Masters, Pörtschach, Warsaw winner Nikolay Davydenko, and Umag titlist Fernando Verdasco. Also competing were Australian Open quarterfinalist Mikhail Youzhny, New Haven winner Marin Čilić, Dmitry Tursunov, Mario Ančić and Marat Safin.

== Finals ==
=== Singles ===
(United Kingdom) Andy Murray defeated (Kazakhstan) Andrey Golubev 6–1, 6–1

- It was Andy Murray's 5th title of the year, and his 8th overall. It was his 2nd consecutive title at the event.

=== Doubles ===
(United States) Travis Parrott / (Slovakia) Filip Polášek defeated (India) Rohan Bopanna / (Belarus) Max Mirnyi 3–6, 7–6^{(7–4)}, [10–8]
