= Daniel Danilović =

Montenegrin-Swedish tennis player

- Country (sports): Serbia and Montenegro (2005–2006); Montenegro (2007–2010); Sweden (2010–2011)
- Born: July 25, 1988 (age 36); Stockholm, Sweden
- Retired: 2011
- Plays: Right-handed (two-handed backhand)
- Prize money: $33,216

Singles
- Career record: 9–5
- Career titles: 0; 1 Futures
- Highest ranking: No. 481 (10 August 2009)

Grand Slam singles results
- US Open Junior: 2R (2005)

Doubles
- Career record: 6–4
- Career titles: 0; 13 Futures
- Highest ranking: No. 343 (29 August 2011)
Medal record
Representing Montenegro
Mediterranean Games
Silver medal – second place	2009 Pescara	Men's Doubles
- Last updated on: 27 March 2020.

Daniel Danilović (Serbian Cyrillic: Даниел Даниловић; born July 25, 1988) is a retired professional tennis player who formerly represented Serbia and Montenegro, Montenegro and most recently Sweden.

== ITF Futures titles ==
=== Singles: (1) ===
Legend
ITF Futures (1)

No.	Date	Tournament	Tier	Surface	Opponent	Score
1.	Oct 2008	Greece F6, Rethymno	Futures	Carpet	(Republic of Ireland) James McGee	4–6, 6–4, 6–3

=== Doubles: (13) ===
Legend
ITF Futures (13)

No.	Date	Tournament	Tier	Surface	Partner	Opponents	Score
1.	Sep 2007	France F15, Forbach	Futures	Carpet (i)	(Germany) Gero Kretschmer	(Jamaica) Dustin Brown (Germany) Daniel Müller	6–3, 6–4
2.	Feb 2008	Germany F4, Mettmann	Futures	Carpet (i)	(Jamaica) Dustin Brown	(Switzerland) Alexander Sadecky (South Africa) Izak Van der Merwe	6–4, 4–6, [10–7]
3.	May 2008	Greece F1, Kos	Futures	Hard	(Latvia) Kārlis Lejnieks	(Australia) Isaac Frost (Australia) Leon Frost	4–6, 6–3, [10–8]
4.	Feb 2009	Spain F5, Cartagena	Futures	Clay	(Montenegro) Goran Tošić	(Netherlands) Romano Frantzen (France) Alexandre Renard	6–1, 6–3
5.	Feb 2009	Spain F6, Cartagena	Futures	Hard	(Montenegro) Goran Tošić	(Netherlands) Romano Frantzen (France) Alexandre Renard	6–1, 6–2
6.	Jun 2009	Serbia F3, Belgrade	Futures	Clay	(Montenegro) Goran Tošić	(Serbia) Darko Mađarovski (Serbia) Aleksander Slović	6–1, 6–1
7.	Aug 2009	Italy F22, Avezzano	Futures	Clay	(Montenegro) Goran Tošić	(Italy) Alessandro Giannessi (Italy) Giorgio Portaluri	0–6, 6–1, [10–3]
8.	Mar 2010	Canada F1, Gatineau	Futures	Hard (i)	(Sweden) Michael Ryderstedt	(United States) Cory Parr (United States) Todd Paul	6–2, 7–6^{(7–4)}
9.	Aug 2010	Italy F23, Piombino	Futures	Hard	(Italy) Claudio Grassi	(Italy) Enrico Fioravante (Colombia) Cristian Rodríguez	7–6^{(7–5)}, 6–4
10.	Sep 2010	Sweden F1, Danderyd	Futures	Hard (i)	(Sweden) Michael Ryderstedt	(Sweden) Pablo Figueroa (Sweden) Rickard Holmström	7–6^{(10–8)}, 7–6^{(11–9)}
11.	Oct 2010	Turkey F9, Antalya	Futures	Hard	(Finland) Juho Paukku	(Turkey) Barkın Yalçınkale (Turkey) Anıl Yüksel	6–1, 6–0
12.	Jan 2011	Germany F1, Schwieberdingen	Futures	Carpet (i)	(Latvia) Andis Juška	(Germany) Martin Emmrich (Germany) Gero Kretschmer	7–6^{(7–3)}, 3–6, 10–7
13.	Jun 2011	USA F6, Harlingen	Futures	Hard	(United States) Joshua Zavala	(Argentina) Juan Pablo Ortiz (Argentina) Marco Trungelliti	6–0, 6–4
