= Stanislav Vovk =

Russian tennis player

Stanislav Vovk Станислав Вовк
- Full name: Stanislav Olegovich Vovk
- Country (sports): Russia
- Residence: Moscow, Russia
- Born: 19 February 1991 (age 34) Moscow, Russia
- Height: 1.85 m (6 ft 1 in)
- Turned pro: 2008
- Plays: Right-handed (one handed-backhand)
- Prize money: $67,248

Singles
- Career record: 0–4 (at ATP Tour level, Grand Slam level, and in Davis Cup)
- Career titles: 0
- Highest ranking: No. 357 (7 July 2014)

Doubles
- Career record: 0–3 (at ATP Tour level, Grand Slam level, and in Davis Cup)
- Career titles: 0
- Highest ranking: No. 387 (22 August 2011)

Stanislav Olegovich Vovk (Russian: Станислав Олегович Вовк; born 19 February 1991 in Moscow) is a former Russian tennis player.

== Tennis career ==
Vovk has a career high ATP singles ranking of No. 357 achieved on 7 July 2014 and a career high ATP doubles ranking of No. 387 achieved on 22 August 2011. Rudnev has won a total of 2 ITF singles titles on the futures circuit as well as 7 ITF doubles title.

Vovk made his ATP main draw debut at the 2009 St. Petersburg Open where he received entry to the main draw as a wildcard entrant into the singles event. He lost in the first round to Björn Phau, 3–6, 2–6.

Vovk is coached by this father, Oleg.

Vovk has retired from professional career in 2015.

== Personal life ==
Vovk's father, Oleg was a runner and his mother was a swimmer. Vovk can speak Russian, English and German. His family moved to the United States in 1997. He cites Frank Lampard as his most inspirational person.
