= 2013 St. Petersburg Open – Singles =

Singles
- 2013 St. Petersburg Open

Final
- Champion: (Latvia) Ernests Gulbis
- Runner-up: (Spain) Guillermo García-López
- Score: 3–6, 6–4, 6–0

Details
- Draw: 32
- Seeds: 8

Events
Singles	Doubles
← 2012 ·	St. Petersburg Open	· 2015 →

Martin Kližan was the defending champion, but withdrew before the tournament began.
Ernests Gulbis won the title, defeating Guillermo García-López in the final, 3–6, 6–4, 6–0.

== Seeds ==
1. (Italy) Fabio Fognini (second round, retired)
2. (Russia) Mikhail Youzhny (second round)
3. (Serbia) Janko Tipsarević (first round)
4. (Russia) Dmitry Tursunov (quarterfinals)
5. (Spain) Fernando Verdasco (first round)
6. (Latvia) Ernests Gulbis (champion)
7. (Czech Republic) Lukáš Rosol (quarterfinals)
8. (Uzbekistan) Denis Istomin (quarterfinals)

== Draw ==
=== Key ===
- Q = Qualifier
- WC = Wild card
- LL = Lucky loser
- Alt = Alternate
- SE = Special exempt
- PR = Protected ranking
- ITF = ITF entry
- JE = Junior exempt
- w/o = Walkover
- r = Retired
- d = Defaulted
- SR = Special ranking

=== Finals ===
Semifinals
(Poland) Michał Przysiężny	3	3
6	(Latvia) Ernests Gulbis	6	6
(Portugal) João Sousa	1	1
(Spain) Guillermo García-López	6	6

Final
6	(Latvia) Ernests Gulbis	3	6	6
(Spain) Guillermo García-López	6	4	0

=== Top half ===
First round
1	(Italy) F Fognini	6	6
Q	(United Kingdom) D Inglot	4	4
(Poland) M Przysiężny	3	6	6
(Spain) A Ramos	6	4	3
(Romania) V Hănescu	6^{4}	6^{4}
WC	(Russia) K Khachanov	7^{7}	7^{7}
(Lithuania) R Berankis	4	6^{4}
7	(Czech Republic) L Rosol	6	7^{7}
3	(Serbia) J Tipsarević	6^{4}	3
(Spain) R Bautista-Agut	7^{7}	6
(France) A Mannarino	1	4
(Russia) E Donskoy	6	6
PR	(Estonia) J Zopp	6	3	6
(Spain) D Gimeno-Traver	1	6	3
WC	(Russia) M Elgin	0	1
6	(Latvia) E Gulbis	6	6

Second round
1	(Italy) F Fognini	3	3^{r}
(Poland) M Przysiężny	6	5
WC	(Russia) K Khachanov	4	4
7	(Czech Republic) L Rosol	6	6
(Spain) R Bautista-Agut	2	6	7^{7}
(Russia) E Donskoy	6	1	6^{5}
PR	(Estonia) J Zopp	3	6	3
6	(Latvia) E Gulbis	6	1	6

Quarterfinals
(Poland) M Przysiężny	7^{9}	1	6
7	(Czech Republic) L Rosol	6^{7}	6	3
(Spain) R Bautista-Agut	1	2
6	(Latvia) E Gulbis	6	6

Semifinals
(Poland) M Przysiężny	3	3
6	(Latvia) E Gulbis	6	6

=== Bottom half ===
First round
5	(Spain) F Verdasco	3	4
(Ukraine) S Stakhovsky	6	6
(Italy) P Lorenzi	3	4
(Portugal) J Sousa	6	6
(Argentina) H Zeballos	6^{5}	3
Q	(Russia) K Kravchuk	7^{7}	6
(Cyprus) M Baghdatis	6^{3}	6^{3}
4	(Russia) D Tursunov	7^{7}	7^{7}
8	(Uzbekistan) D Istomin	6	3	7
Q	(Australia) S Groth	4	6	5
(Germany) J Struff	7^{7}	3	1
(Kazakhstan) A Golubev	6^{3}	6	6
Q	(Russia) M Biryukov	4	1
(Spain) G García-López	6	6
WC	(Russia) A Karatsev	7^{7}	2	2
2	(Russia) M Youzhny	6^{5}	6	6

Second round
(Ukraine) S Stakhovsky	6	4	0
(Portugal) J Sousa	3	6	6
Q	(Russia) K Kravchuk	3	0
4	(Russia) D Tursunov	6	6
8	(Uzbekistan) D Istomin	4	6	6
(Kazakhstan) A Golubev	6	3	4
(Spain) G García-López	6	4	6
2	(Russia) M Youzhny	4	6	3

Quarterfinals
(Portugal) J Sousa	6	6
4	(Russia) D Tursunov	4	3
8	(Uzbekistan) D Istomin	2	4
(Spain) G García-López	6	6

Semifinals
(Portugal) J Sousa	1	1
(Spain) G García-López	6	6

== Qualifying ==
=== Seeds ===
1. (Russia) Konstantin Kravchuk (qualified)
2. (Australia) Samuel Groth (qualified)
3. (Russia) Alexander Kudryavtsev (qualifying competition)
4. (Russia) Valery Rudnev (qualifying competition)
5. (Russia) Victor Baluda (qualifying competition)
6. (Russia) Mikhail Biryukov (qualified)
7. (Belarus) Alexander Bury (qualifying competition)
8. (Estonia) Vladimir Ivanov (first round)

=== Qualifiers ===
1. (Russia) Konstantin Kravchuk
2. (Australia) Samuel Groth
3. (United Kingdom) Dominic Inglot
4. (Russia) Mikhail Biryukov

=== Qualifying draw ===
==== First qualifier ====
First round
1	(Russia) Konstantin Kravchuk	6^{3}	6	6
(Russia) Alexander Vasilenko	7^{7}	2	2
WC	(Russia) Teimouraz Metreveli	2	4
(Russia) Kirill Saplin	6	6
(Russia) Fedor Chervyakov	6	6
(Russia) Artur Madzhar	0	1
WC	(Russia) Nikita Gudozhnikov	1	2
7	(Belarus) Alexander Bury	6	6

Second round
1	(Russia) Konstantin Kravchuk	6	6
(Russia) Kirill Saplin	4	1
(Russia) Fedor Chervyakov	2	1
7	(Belarus) Alexander Bury	6	6

Qualifying competition
1	(Russia) Konstantin Kravchuk	6	7^{7}
7	(Belarus) Alexander Bury	4	6^{4}

==== Second qualifier ====
First round
2	(Australia) Samuel Groth	6	6
(Germany) Frank Moser	1	4
(Russia) Mikhail Vaks	6	7
(Russia) Vitaliy Kachanovskiy	3	5
(Russia) Timur Razmaitov	1	1
(Russia) Anton Zaitsev	6	6
WC	(Russia) Dmitrii Dosuzhev	3	1
5	(Russia) Victor Baluda	6	6

Second round
2	(Australia) Samuel Groth	7^{7}	6
(Russia) Mikhail Vaks	6^{4}	4
(Russia) Anton Zaitsev	7	0	1
5	(Russia) Victor Baluda	5	6	6

Qualifying competition
2	(Australia) Samuel Groth	6	6
5	(Russia) Victor Baluda	4	3

==== Third qualifier ====
First round
3	(Russia) Alexander Kudryavtsev	6	6
(Belarus) Andrei Vasilevski	4	2
(Russia) Alexander Zhurbin	4	5
(Russia) Sergey Strelkov	6	7
(Russia) Alexander Igoshin	6	6
(Russia) Dmitri Marfinsky	4	1
(United Kingdom) Dominic Inglot	6	4	7
8	(Estonia) Vladimir Ivanov	3	6	5

Second round
3	(Russia) Alexander Kudryavtsev	6	6
(Russia) Sergey Strelkov	1	2
(Russia) Alexander Igoshin	1	2
(United Kingdom) Dominic Inglot	6	6

Qualifying competition
3	(Russia) Alexander Kudryavtsev	6^{7}	6^{3}
(United Kingdom) Dominic Inglot	7^{9}	7^{7}

==== Fourth qualifier ====
First round
4	(Russia) Valery Rudnev	7^{9}	6
(Russia) Vladimir Polyakov	6^{7}	3
(Russia) Pavel Zelenkin	2	4
(Russia) Evgeny Elistratov	6	6
WC	(Russia) Andrei Stoliarov	0	1
(Czech Republic) František Čermák	6	6
(Russia) Stepan Khotulev	6	2	1
6	(Russia) Mikhail Biryukov	3	6	6

Second round
4	(Russia) Valery Rudnev	6	6
(Russia) Evgeny Elistratov	4	2
(Czech Republic) František Čermák	3	4
6	(Russia) Mikhail Biryukov	6	6

Qualifying competition
4	(Russia) Valery Rudnev	4	4
6	(Russia) Mikhail Biryukov	6	6
