= 2012 St. Petersburg Open – Singles =

Singles
- 2012 St. Petersburg Open

Final
- Champion: (Slovakia) Martin Kližan
- Runner-up: (Italy) Fabio Fognini
- Score: 6–2, 6–3

Details
- Draw: 32
- Seeds: 8

Events
Singles	Doubles
← 2011 ·	St. Petersburg Open	· 2013 →

Marin Čilić was the defending champion but chose not to compete.
Martin Kližan won his first ATP World Tour title by defeating Fabio Fognini in the final, 6–2, 6–3.

== Seeds ==
1. (Russia) Mikhail Youzhny (semifinals)
2. (Uzbekistan) Denis Istomin (first round)
3. (Slovakia) Martin Kližan (champion)
4. (Italy) Fabio Fognini (final)
5. (Slovakia) Lukáš Lacko (first round)
6. (Chinese Taipei) Lu Yen-hsun (first round)
7. (Spain) Guillermo García-López (quarterfinals)
8. (Estonia) Jürgen Zopp (second round, retired due to back injury)

== Draw ==
=== Key ===
- Q = Qualifier
- WC = Wild card
- LL = Lucky loser
- Alt = Alternate
- SE = Special exempt
- PR = Protected ranking
- ITF = ITF entry
- JE = Junior exempt
- w/o = Walkover
- r = Retired
- d = Defaulted
- SR = Special ranking

=== Finals ===
Semifinals
1	(Russia) Mikhail Youzhny	7^{13}	4	6^{3}
3	(Slovakia) Martin Kližan	6^{11}	6	7^{7}
4	(Italy) Fabio Fognini	6	6
(Spain) Daniel Gimeno-Traver	3	4

Final
3	(Slovakia) Martin Kližan	6	6
4	(Italy) Fabio Fognini	2	3

=== Top half ===
First round
1	(Russia) M Youzhny	7^{7}	6
(Canada) V Pospisil	6^{4}	1
(Germany) M Bachinger	4	4
(United States) R Ram	6	6
Q	(Belarus) S Betov	6	2	2
(Italy) P Lorenzi	1	6	6
WC	(Russia) E Donskoy	6	4	3
7	(Spain) G García-López	2	6	6
3	(Slovakia) M Kližan	6	6
WC	(Russia) M Elgin	4	3
(Italy) S Bolelli	7^{7}	7
(Argentina) H Zeballos	6^{3}	5
(Germany) P Petzschner	2	3^{r}
(Lithuania) R Berankis	6	3
Q	(Russia) A Kumantsov	3	3^{r}
8	(Estonia) J Zopp	6	5

Second round
1	(Russia) M Youzhny	6	6
(United States) R Ram	1	4
(Italy) P Lorenzi	1	1^{r}
7	(Spain) G García-López	6	3
3	(Slovakia) M Kližan	6	6
(Italy) S Bolelli	3	3
(Lithuania) R Berankis	6
8	(Estonia) J Zopp	3	r

Quarterfinals
1	(Russia) M Youzhny	6	0	6
7	(Spain) G García-López	4	6	3
3	(Slovakia) M Kližan	6	6
(Lithuania) R Berankis	3	2

Semifinals
1	(Russia) M Youzhny	7^{13}	4	6^{3}
3	(Slovakia) M Kližan	6^{11}	6	7^{7}

=== Bottom half ===
First round
6	(Chinese Taipei) Y-h Lu	4	2
(Spain) R Bautista-Agut	6	6
WC	(Russia) T Gabashvili	6	6
Q	(Belarus) N Fidirko	2	0
LL	(Russia) I Nedelko	6^{2}	2
(Ukraine) S Stakhovsky	7^{7}	6
(Germany) T Kamke	6	2	3
4	(Italy) F Fognini	4	6	6
5	(Slovakia) L Lacko	3	2
(Slovenia) G Žemlja	6	6
(Italy) F Cipolla	7^{7}	7^{8}
Q	(Belarus) A Vasilevski	6^{4}	6^{6}
(France) F Serra	6^{5}	2
(Spain) D Gimeno-Traver	7^{7}	6
(Poland) Ł Kubot	4	6	6
2	(Uzbekistan) D Istomin	6	3	4

Second round
(Spain) R Bautista-Agut	6	6
WC	(Russia) T Gabashvili	3	4
(Ukraine) S Stakhovsky	6^{4}	4
4	(Italy) F Fognini	7^{7}	6
(Slovenia) G Žemlja	2	7^{7}	3
(Italy) F Cipolla	6	6^{5}	6
(Spain) D Gimeno-Traver	6	7^{7}
(Poland) Ł Kubot	4	6^{5}

Quarterfinals
(Spain) R Bautista-Agut	4	6^{1}
4	(Italy) F Fognini	6	7^{7}
(Italy) F Cipolla	2	5
(Spain) D Gimeno-Traver	6	7

Semifinals
4	(Italy) F Fognini	6	6
(Spain) D Gimeno-Traver	3	4

== Qualifying ==
=== Seeds ===
1. (Russia) Andrey Kumantsov (qualified)
2. (Ukraine) Stanislav Poplavskyy (second round)
3. (Russia) Ivan Nedelko (qualifying competition, lucky loser)
4. (Belarus) Sergey Betov (qualified)
5. (Russia) Mikhail Fufygin (second round)
6. (Belarus) Egor Gerasimov (second round)
7. (United Kingdom) Morgan Phillips (qualifying competition)
8. (Russia) Anton Zaitsev (second round)

=== Qualifiers ===
1. (Russia) Andrey Kumantsov
2. (Belarus) Nikolai Fidirko
3. (Belarus) Andrei Vasilevski
4. (Belarus) Sergey Betov

=== Lucky loser ===
1. (Russia) Ivan Nedelko

=== Draw ===
==== First qualifier ====
Second round
1	(Russia) Andrey Kumantsov	6	7
(Russia) Sergey Strelkov	3	5
WC	(Russia) Vugar Aliev	2	5
7	(United Kingdom) Morgan Phillips	6	7

Qualifying competition
1	(Russia) Andrey Kumantsov	6	7^{7}
7	(United Kingdom) Morgan Phillips	1	6^{4}

==== Second qualifier ====
First round					Second round					Qualifying competition
					2	(Ukraine) Stanislav Poplavskyy	1	2
	(Russia) Valery Rudnev	4	7^{7}	6		(Russia) Valery Rudnev	6	6
	(Russia) Aslan Karatsev	6	6^{1}	3						(Russia) Valery Rudnev	3	6	0
	(Belarus) Nikolai Fidirko	6	6							(Belarus) Nikolai Fidirko	6	4	6
WC	(Russia) Timofey Skripkin	2	0			(Belarus) Nikolai Fidirko	3	7	6
					8	(Russia) Anton Zaitsev	6	5	2

==== Third qualifier ====
Second round
3	(Russia) Ivan Nedelko	6	6
WC	(Russia) Nikita Gudozhnikov	1	1
(Belarus) Andrei Vasilevski	7	6
6	(Belarus) Egor Gerasimov	5	1

Qualifying competition
3	(Russia) Ivan Nedelko	2	6^{5}
(Belarus) Andrei Vasilevski	6	7^{7}

==== Fourth qualifier ====
First round				Second round					Qualifying competition
				4	(Belarus) Sergey Betov	6	6
WC	(Russia) Artur Gusev	0	0		(Ukraine) Volodymyr Uzhylovskyi	3	3
	(Ukraine) Volodymyr Uzhylovskyi	6	6						4	(Belarus) Sergey Betov	6	6
	(Russia) Beka Komakhidze	2	0							(Czech Republic) František Čermák	4	4
	(Czech Republic) František Čermák	6	6		(Czech Republic) František Čermák	6	1	6
				5	(Russia) Mikhail Fufygin	4	6	0
