= 2013 St. Petersburg Open – Doubles =

Doubles
- 2013 St. Petersburg Open

Final
- Champions: (Spain) David Marrero (Spain) Fernando Verdasco
- Runners-up: (United Kingdom) Dominic Inglot (Uzbekistan) Denis Istomin
- Score: 7–6^{(8–6)}, 6–3

Events
Singles	Doubles
← 2012 ·	St. Petersburg Open	· 2014 →

Rajeev Ram and Nenad Zimonjić were the defending champions, but chose not to participate.
David Marrero and Fernando Verdasco won the title, defeating Dominic Inglot and Denis Istomin in the final, 7–6^{(8–6)}, 6–3.

== Seeds ==
1. (Spain) David Marrero / (Spain) Fernando Verdasco (champions)
2. (Belarus) Max Mirnyi / (Romania) Horia Tecău (first round)
3. (Italy) Daniele Bracciali / (Czech Republic) Lukáš Dlouhý (quarterfinals)
4. (Czech Republic) František Čermák / (Slovakia) Filip Polášek (quarterfinals)

== Draw ==
=== Key ===
- Q = Qualifier
- WC = Wild card
- LL = Lucky loser
- Alt = Alternate
- SE = Special exempt
- PR = Protected ranking
- ITF = ITF entry
- JE = Junior exempt
- w/o = Walkover
- r = Retired
- d = Defaulted
- SR = Special ranking

=== Draw ===
First round
1	(Spain) D Marrero (Spain) F Verdasco	1	6	[10]
(Poland) M Kowalczyk (Slovakia) I Zelenay	6	3	[5]
(India) P Raja (India) D Sharan	6^{6}	4
WC	(Russia) V Baluda (Russia) K Kravchuk	7^{8}	6
4	(Czech Republic) F Čermák (Slovakia) F Polášek	7	7^{8}
(Italy) F Fognini (Italy) P Lorenzi	5	6^{6}
Alt	(Russia) D Marfinsky (Russia) S Strelkov	3	2
(Australia) S Groth (Australia) C Guccione	6	6
(Ukraine) S Stakhovsky (Russia) M Youzhny	4	6^{4}
(Russia) A Karatsev (Russia) D Tursunov	6	7^{7}
WC	(Russia) M Elgin (Russia) A Kudryavtsev	1	6^{5}
3	(Italy) D Bracciali (Czech Republic) L Dlouhý	6	7^{7}
(Romania) F Mergea (Czech Republic) L Rosol	5	6	[12]
(Lithuania) R Berankis (Serbia) J Tipsarević	7	2	[14]
(United Kingdom) D Inglot (Uzbekistan) D Istomin	6	7
2	(Belarus) M Mirnyi (Romania) H Tecău	4	5

Quarterfinals
1	(Spain) D Marrero (Spain) F Verdasco	6	7^{10}
WC	(Russia) V Baluda (Russia) K Kravchuk	4	6^{8}
4	(Czech Republic) F Čermák (Slovakia) F Polášek	3	6	[4]
(Australia) S Groth (Australia) C Guccione	6	3	[10]
(Russia) A Karatsev (Russia) D Tursunov	6	6
3	(Italy) D Bracciali (Czech Republic) L Dlouhý	1	2
(Lithuania) R Berankis (Serbia) J Tipsarević
(United Kingdom) D Inglot (Uzbekistan) D Istomin	w/o

Semifinals
1	(Spain) D Marrero (Spain) F Verdasco	3	7^{7}	[10]
(Australia) S Groth (Australia) C Guccione	6	6^{4}	[5]
(Russia) A Karatsev (Russia) D Tursunov	4	7	[9]
(United Kingdom) D Inglot (Uzbekistan) D Istomin	6	5	[11]

Final
1	(Spain) D Marrero (Spain) F Verdasco	7^{8}	6
(United Kingdom) D Inglot (Uzbekistan) D Istomin	6^{6}	3
