= 2013 St. Petersburg Open =

- Date: 16–22 September
- Edition: 19th
- Category: ATP World Tour 250 Series
- Surface: Hard
- Location: St. Petersburg, Russia
- Venue: Petersburg Sports and Concert Complex

Champions

Singles
- (Latvia) Ernests Gulbis

Doubles
- (Spain) David Marrero / (Spain) Fernando Verdasco
← 2012 ·	St. Petersburg Open	· 2015 →

The 2013 St. Petersburg Open was a tennis tournament played on indoor hard courts. It was the 19th edition of the St. Petersburg Open, and part of the ATP World Tour 250 Series of the 2013 ATP World Tour. It took place at the Petersburg Sports and Concert Complex in Saint Petersburg, Russia, from September 16 through 22, 2013.

== Singles main-draw entrants ==
=== Seeds ===
Country	Player	Rank^{1}	Seed
ITA	Fabio Fognini	17	1
RUS	Mikhail Youzhny	20	2
SRB	Janko Tipsarević	23	3
RUS	Dmitry Tursunov	32	4
ESP	Fernando Verdasco	33	5
LAT	Ernests Gulbis	36	6
CZE	Lukáš Rosol	46	7
UZB	Denis Istomin	47	8

- ^{1} Rankings are as of September 9, 2013

=== Other entrants ===
The following players received wildcards into the singles main draw:

- (Russia) Mikhail Elgin
- (Russia) Aslan Karatsev
- (Russia) Karen Khachanov

The following players received entry from the qualifying draw:

- (Russia) Mikhail Biryukov
- (Australia) Samuel Groth
- (United Kingdom) Dominic Inglot
- (Russia) Konstantin Kravchuk

=== Withdrawals ===
Before the tournament

- (Russia) Alex Bogomolov Jr.
- (Slovakia) Martin Kližan

=== Retirements ===
- (Italy) Fabio Fognini (right foot injury)

== Doubles main-draw entrants ==
=== Seeds ===
Country	Player	Country	Player	Rank^{1}	Seed
ESP	David Marrero	ESP	Fernando Verdasco	41	1
BLR	Max Mirnyi	ROU	Horia Tecău	56	2
ITA	Daniele Bracciali	CZE	Lukáš Dlouhý	82	3
CZE	František Čermák	SVK	Filip Polášek	97	4

- Rankings are as of September 9, 2013

=== Other entrants ===
The following pairs received wildcards into the doubles main draw:

- (Russia) Victor Baluda / (Russia) Konstantin Kravchuk
- (Russia) Mikhail Elgin / (Russia) Alexander Kudryavtsev

The following pair received entry as alternates:

- (Russia) Dmitri Marfinsky / (Russia) Sergey Strelkov

=== Withdrawals ===
Before the tournament

- (Germany) Philipp Marx

During the tournament

- (Serbia) Janko Tipsarević (right wrist injury)

== Finals ==
=== Singles ===
- (Latvia) Ernests Gulbis defeated (Spain) Guillermo García López, 3–6, 6–4, 6–0.

=== Doubles ===
- (Spain) David Marrero / (Spain) Fernando Verdasco defeated (United Kingdom) Dominic Inglot / (Uzbekistan) Denis Istomin, 7–6^{(8–6)}, 6–3.
