= 2011 St. Petersburg Open – Singles Qualifying =

This article displays the qualifying draw of the 2011 St. Petersburg Open.

== Players ==
=== Seeds ===
1. (Turkey) Marsel İlhan (second round)
2. (Russia) Teymuraz Gabashvili (qualified)
3. (Kazakhstan) Andrey Golubev (first round)
4. (Canada) Vasek Pospisil (qualified)
5. (Russia) Alexandre Kudryavtsev (qualifying competition)
6. (Ukraine) Illya Marchenko (first round)
7. (Ukraine) Sergei Bubka (qualified)
8. (Croatia) Antonio Veić (second round)

=== Qualifiers ===
1. (Serbia) Dušan Lajović
2. (Russia) Teymuraz Gabashvili
3. (Ukraine) Sergei Bubka
4. (Canada) Vasek Pospisil

== Qualifying draw ==
=== First qualifier ===
First Round
1	(Turkey) Marsel İlhan	6	4	6
(Belgium) Yannick Mertens	4	6	2
(Germany) Mischa Zverev	5	2
(Serbia) Dušan Lajović	7	6
WC	(Russia) Evgeny Karlovskiy	2	2
(Germany) Stefan Seifert	6	6
(Belarus) Alexander Bury	6	6
6	(Ukraine) Illya Marchenko	3	4

Second Round
1	(Turkey) Marsel İlhan	4	3
(Serbia) Dušan Lajović	6	6
(Germany) Stefan Seifert	2	4
(Belarus) Alexander Bury	6	6

Qualifying Competition
(Serbia) Dušan Lajović	6	6
(Belarus) Alexander Bury	4	3

=== Second qualifier ===
First Round
2	(Russia) Teymuraz Gabashvili	7	6
(Russia) Stanislav Vovk	5	0
(Germany) Alexander Waske	6	6
WC	(Russia) Michail Elgin	3	4
(Russia) Konstantin Kravchuk	6	6
(Russia) Evgeny Kirillov	3	4
(Russia) Victor Baluda	6^{5}	0
8	(Croatia) Antonio Veić	7^{7}	6

Second Round
2	(Russia) Teymuraz Gabashvili	6	6
(Germany) Alexander Waske	1	4
(Russia) Konstantin Kravchuk	6	7
8	(Croatia) Antonio Veić	4	5

Qualifying Competition
2	(Russia) Teymuraz Gabashvili	5	6	7^{9}
(Russia) Konstantin Kravchuk	7	3	6^{7}

=== Third qualifier ===
First Round
3	(Kazakhstan) Andrey Golubev	4	2
(Russia) Ilya Belyaev	6	6
(Israel) Amir Weintraub	6	6
(Uzbekistan) Murad Inoyatov	4	1
(Russia) Mikhail Ledovskikh	6	2	6
(France) Alexandre Sidorenko	3	6	1
WC	(Israel) Saar Steele	1	3
7	(Ukraine) Sergei Bubka	6	6

Second Round
(Russia) Ilya Belyaev	6	6
(Israel) Amir Weintraub	0	2
(Russia) Mikhail Ledovskikh	2	5
7	(Ukraine) Sergei Bubka	6	7

Qualifying Competition
(Russia) Ilya Belyaev	4	4
7	(Ukraine) Sergei Bubka	6	6

=== Fourth qualifier ===
First Round
4	(Canada) Vasek Pospisil	7	1
(Russia) Andrey Kumantsov	5	0^{r}
WC	(Russia) Shalva Dzhanashia	3	4
(Moldova) Radu Albot	6	6
(Netherlands) Matwé Middelkoop	6	6
(Russia) Ervand Gasparyan	3	3
(Russia) Denis Matsukevich	2	5
5	(Russia) Alexandre Kudryavtsev	6	7

Second Round
4	(Canada) Vasek Pospisil	7	4	6
(Moldova) Radu Albot	5	6	3
(Netherlands) Matwé Middelkoop	6^{0}	7^{7}	4
5	(Russia) Alexandre Kudryavtsev	7^{7}	6^{4}	6

Qualifying Competition
4	(Canada) Vasek Pospisil	6	6
5	(Russia) Alexandre Kudryavtsev	2	3
