= 2012 St. Petersburg Open =

- Date: 17–23 September
- Edition: 18th
- Category: ATP World Tour 250 Series
- Draw: 32S / 16D
- Prize money: $410,850
- Surface: Hard / indoor
- Location: St. Petersburg, Russia
- Venue: Petersburg Sports and Concert Complex

Champions

Singles
- (Slovakia) Martin Kližan

Doubles
- (United States) Rajeev Ram / (Serbia) Nenad Zimonjić
← 2011 ·	St. Petersburg Open	· 2013 →

The 2012 St. Petersburg Open was a tennis tournament played on indoor hard courts, marking the 17th edition of the St. Petersburg Open, and part of the ATP World Tour 250 Series of the 2012 ATP World Tour. The tournament took place at the Petersburg Sports and Concert Complex in Saint Petersburg, Russia, from 17 to 23 September 2012. Third-seeded Martin Kližan claimed the singles title.

== Singles main-draw entrants ==
=== Seeds ===
Country	Player	Rank^{1}	Seed
RUS	Mikhail Youzhny	29	1
UZB	Denis Istomin	34	2
SVK	Martin Kližan	46	3
ITA	Fabio Fognini	54	4
SVK	Lukáš Lacko	57	5
TPE	Lu Yen-hsun	59	6
ESP	Guillermo García López	68	7
EST	Jürgen Zopp	71	8

- ^{1} Seeds are based on the rankings of September 10, 2012

=== Other entrants ===
The following players received wildcards into the singles main draw:

- (Russia) Evgeny Donskoy
- (Russia) Mikhail Elgin
- (Russia) Teymuraz Gabashvili

The following players received entry from the qualifying draw:

- (Belarus) Sergey Betov
- (Belarus) Nikolai Fidirko
- (Russia) Andrey Kumantsov
- (Belarus) Andrei Vasilevski

The following players received entry as lucky loser:

- (Russia) Ivan Nedelko

=== Withdrawals ===
- (Russia) Igor Andreev (right shoulder injury)
- (Spain) Pablo Andújar
- (Slovenia) Aljaž Bedene
- (Slovenia) Blaž Kavčič
- (Kazakhstan) Mikhail Kukushkin

=== Retirements ===
- (Russia) Andrey Kumantsov (dizziness)
- (Italy) Paolo Lorenzi (left Achilles tendon injury)
- (Germany) Philipp Petzschner (knee injury)
- (Estonia) Jürgen Zopp (back injury)

== Doubles main-draw entrants ==
=== Seeds ===
Country	Player	Country	Player	Rank^{1}	Seed
USA	Rajeev Ram	SRB	Nenad Zimonjić	64	1
GBR	Colin Fleming	GBR	Ross Hutchins	69	2
CZE	František Čermák	SVK	Michal Mertiňák	79	3
GER	Frank Moser	GBR	Ken Skupski	134	4

- Rankings are as of September 10, 2012

=== Other entrants ===
The following pairs received wildcards into the doubles main draw:

- (Lithuania) Ričardas Berankis / (Russia) Nikita Gudozhnikov
- (Russia) Andrey Yakovlev / (Russia) Alexander Zhurbin

== Finals ==
=== Singles ===
(Slovakia) Martin Kližan defeated (Italy) Fabio Fognini, 6–2, 6–3 It was Kližan's first title on the ATP World Tour.

=== Doubles ===
- (United States) Rajeev Ram / (Serbia) Nenad Zimonjić defeated (Slovakia) Lukáš Lacko / (Slovakia) Igor Zelenay 6–2, 4–6, [10–6]
