= 2010 St. Petersburg Open – Doubles =

Doubles
- 2010 St. Petersburg Open

Final
- Champions: (Italy) Daniele Bracciali (Italy) Potito Starace
- Runners-up: (India) Rohan Bopanna (Pakistan) Aisam-ul-Haq Qureshi
- Score: 7–6^{(8–6)}, 7–6^{(7–5)}

Events
Singles	Doubles
← 2009 ·	St. Petersburg Open	· 2011 →

Colin Fleming and Ken Skupski were the defending champions, but lost to Filip Polášek and Igor Zelenay in the first round.
Daniele Bracciali and Potito Starace won the final against Rohan Bopanna and Aisam-ul-Haq Qureshi 7–6^{(8–6)}, 7–6^{(7–5)}.

== Seeds ==
1. (Czech Republic) František Čermák / (Slovakia) Michal Mertiňák (first round)
2. (India) Rohan Bopanna / (Pakistan) Aisam-ul-Haq Qureshi (final)
3. (Slovakia) Filip Polášek / (Slovakia) Igor Zelenay (semifinals)
4. (United States) Scott Lipsky / (United States) Rajeev Ram (first round)

== Draw ==
=== Key ===
- Q = Qualifier
- WC = Wild card
- LL = Lucky loser
- Alt = Alternate
- SE = Special exempt
- PR = Protected ranking
- ITF = ITF entry
- JE = Junior exempt
- w/o = Walkover
- r = Retired
- d = Defaulted
- SR = Special ranking

=== Draw ===
First round
1	(Czech Republic) F Čermák (Slovakia) M Mertiňák	6^{5}	3
(Chinese Taipei) Y-h Lu (Germany) R Schüttler	7^{7}	6
WC	(Russia) M Elgin (Russia) T Gabashvili	6	6^{1}	[10]
(United States) J Cerretani (Romania) V Hănescu	3	7^{7}	[4]
4	(United States) S Lipsky (United States) R Ram	1	2
(Kazakhstan) M Kukushkin (Ukraine) I Marchenko	6	6
(Italy) D Bracciali (Italy) P Starace	6	6
WC	(Russia) A Yakovlev (Russia) A Zhurbin	2	1
(Spain) P Andújar (United States) M Russell	6	7^{7}
(Ukraine) A Dolgopolov (Poland) M Przysiężny	1	6^{4}
(United Kingdom) C Fleming (United Kingdom) K Skupski	4	2
3	(Slovakia) F Polášek (Slovakia) I Zelenay	6	6
(Serbia) J Tipsarević (Serbia) V Troicki	6	6
(Italy) F Fognini (Argentina) M González	3	4
(Ukraine) S Stakhovsky (Russia) M Youzhny	2	6	[3]
2	(India) R Bopanna (Pakistan) A-u-H Qureshi	6	2	[10]

Quarterfinals
(Chinese Taipei) Y-h Lu (Germany) R Schüttler	2	4
WC	(Russia) M Elgin (Russia) T Gabashvili	6	6
(Kazakhstan) M Kukushkin (Ukraine) I Marchenko	4	4
(Italy) D Bracciali (Italy) P Starace	6	6
(Spain) P Andújar (United States) M Russell	1	3
3	(Slovakia) F Polášek (Slovakia) I Zelenay	6	6
(Serbia) J Tipsarević (Serbia) V Troicki	6	6^{4}	[1]
2	(India) R Bopanna (Pakistan) A-u-H Qureshi	3	7^{7}	[10]

Semifinals
WC	(Russia) M Elgin (Russia) T Gabashvili	3	2
(Italy) D Bracciali (Italy) P Starace	6	6
3	(Slovakia) F Polášek (Slovakia) I Zelenay	6	3	[8]
2	(India) R Bopanna (Pakistan) A-u-H Qureshi	4	6	[10]

Final
(Italy) D Bracciali (Italy) P Starace	7^{8}	7^{7}
2	(India) R Bopanna (Pakistan) A-u-H Qureshi	6^{6}	6^{5}
