= 2012 St. Petersburg Open – Doubles =

Doubles
- 2012 St. Petersburg Open

Final
- Champions: (United States) Rajeev Ram (Serbia) Nenad Zimonjić
- Runners-up: (Slovakia) Lukáš Lacko (Slovakia) Igor Zelenay
- Score: 6–2, 4–6, [10–6]

Events
Singles	Doubles
← 2011 ·	St. Petersburg Open	· 2013 →

In the doubles competition of the 2012 St. Petersburg Open tennis tournament, Colin Fleming and Ross Hutchins were the defending champions, but had lost in the quarterfinals to Martin Kližan and Filip Polášek.
In the final, first seeds Rajeev Ram and Nenad Zimonjić prevailed over the Slovak team of Lukáš Lacko and Igor Zelenay by the score of 6–2, 4–6, [10–6].

== Seeds ==
1. (United States) Rajeev Ram / (Serbia) Nenad Zimonjić (champions)
2. (United Kingdom) Colin Fleming / (United Kingdom) Ross Hutchins (quarterfinals)
3. (Czech Republic) František Čermák / (Slovakia) Michal Mertiňák (quarterfinals)
4. (Germany) Frank Moser / (United Kingdom) Ken Skupski (semifinals)

== Draw ==
=== Key ===
- Q = Qualifier
- WC = Wild card
- LL = Lucky loser
- Alt = Alternate
- ITF = ITF entry
- PR = Protected ranking
- SR = Special ranking
- SE = Special exempt
- JE = Junior exempt
- JR = Junior Accelerator Programme entrant
- CO = College Accelerator Programme entrant
- NG = Next Gen Accelerator Program entrant
- w/o = Walkover
- r = Retired
- d = Defaulted

=== Draw ===
First round
1	(United States) R Ram (Serbia) N Zimonjić	6	6
(Italy) F Cipolla (Italy) P Lorenzi	3	4
(United States) J Cerretani (Germany) M Kohlmann	3	7^{7}	[7]
(Germany) P Marx (Romania) F Mergea	6	6^{2}	[10]
4	(Germany) F Moser (United Kingdom) K Skupski	2	7	[10]
(Italy) S Bolelli (Italy) F Fognini	6	5	[5]
(Spain) G García-López (Argentina) H Zeballos	2	4
(Poland) Ł Kubot (Russia) M Youzhny	6	6
WC	(Lithuania) R Berankis (Russia) N Gudozhnikov	1	1
(Slovakia) L Lacko (Slovakia) I Zelenay	6	6
WC	(Russia) A Yakovlev (Russia) A Zhurbin	4	0
3	(Czech Republic) F Čermák (Slovakia) M Mertiňák	6	6
(Slovakia) M Kližan (Slovakia) F Polášek	6	3	[11]
(Germany) P Petzschner (Ukraine) S Stakhovsky	3	6	[9]
(Russia) M Elgin (Uzbekistan) D Istomin	5	1
2	(United Kingdom) C Fleming (United Kingdom) R Hutchins	7	6

Quarterfinals
1	(United States) R Ram (Serbia) N Zimonjić	2	6	[10]
(Germany) P Marx (Romania) F Mergea	6	1	[8]
4	(Germany) F Moser (United Kingdom) K Skupski	6	7^{7}
(Poland) Ł Kubot (Russia) M Youzhny	3	6^{4}
(Slovakia) L Lacko (Slovakia) I Zelenay	4	6	[10]
3	(Czech Republic) F Čermák (Slovakia) M Mertiňák	6	3	[7]
(Slovakia) M Kližan (Slovakia) F Polášek	7	2	[10]
2	(United Kingdom) C Fleming (United Kingdom) R Hutchins	5	6	[4]

Semifinals
1	(United States) R Ram (Serbia) N Zimonjić	6^{5}	7^{7}	[10]
4	(Germany) F Moser (United Kingdom) K Skupski	7^{7}	6	[5]
(Slovakia) L Lacko (Slovakia) I Zelenay	6	3	[10]
(Slovakia) M Kližan (Slovakia) F Polášek	3	6	[5]

Final
1	(United States) R Ram (Serbia) N Zimonjić	6	4	[10]
(Slovakia) L Lacko (Slovakia) I Zelenay	3	6	[6]
