= 2011 St. Petersburg Open – Doubles =

Doubles
- 2011 St. Petersburg Open

Final
- Champions: (United Kingdom) Colin Fleming (United Kingdom) Ross Hutchins
- Runners-up: (Russia) Michail Elgin (Russia) Alexandre Kudryavtsev
- Score: 6–3, 6–7^{(5–7)}, [10–8]

Events
Singles	Doubles
← 2010 ·	St. Petersburg Open	· 2012 →

Daniele Bracciali and Potito Starace were the defending champions, but were eliminated in the quarterfinals.

Colin Fleming and Ross Hutchins won the tournament, defeating Michail Elgin and Alexandre final.

== Seeds ==
1. (Czech Republic) František Čermák / (Slovakia) Filip Polášek (semifinals)
2. (Italy) Daniele Bracciali / (Italy) Potito Starace (quarterfinals)
3. (United Kingdom) Colin Fleming / (United Kingdom) Ross Hutchins (champions)
4. (Israel) Jonathan Erlich / (Israel) Andy Ram (first round)

== Draw ==
=== Key ===
- Q = Qualifier
- WC = Wild card
- LL = Lucky loser
- Alt = Alternate
- SE = Special exempt
- PR = Protected ranking
- ITF = ITF entry
- JE = Junior exempt
- w/o = Walkover
- r = Retired
- d = Defaulted
- SR = Special ranking

=== Draw ===
First round
1	(Czech Republic) F Čermák (Slovakia) F Polášek	6	6
WC	(Israel) D Sela (Israel) S Steele	2	3
(Spain) M Granollers (Spain) P Riba	6	6
(Austria) J Knowle (Belgium) D Norman	3	3
3	(United Kingdom) C Fleming (United Kingdom) R Hutchins	7^{7}	6
(United States) A Bogomolov Jr. (Czech Republic) L Dlouhý	6^{5}	2
(United States) J Cerretani (Germany) P Marx	4	6	[10]
(France) J Benneteau (United Kingdom) J Murray	6	3	[5]
(Germany) M Kohlmann (Germany) A Waske	7	6
WC	(Russia) I Kunitsyn (Russia) D Tursunov	5	4
(Slovakia) M Mertiňák (Russia) M Youzhny	6^{5}	6	[10]
4	(Israel) J Erlich (Israel) A Ram	7^{7}	3	[4]
(Russia) M Elgin (Russia) A Kudryavtsev	3	6	[10]
(Croatia) M Čilić (Croatia) L Zovko	6	3	[7]
(Italy) A Seppi (Slovakia) I Zelenay	6^{4}	3
2	(Italy) D Bracciali (Italy) P Starace	7^{7}	6

Quarterfinals
1	(Czech Republic) F Čermák (Slovakia) F Polášek	6	6
(Spain) M Granollers (Spain) P Riba	2	2
3	(United Kingdom) C Fleming (United Kingdom) R Hutchins	6	3	[10]
(United States) J Cerretani (Germany) P Marx	3	6	[4]
(Germany) M Kohlmann (Germany) A Waske	7	6
(Slovakia) M Mertiňák (Russia) M Youzhny	5	2
(Russia) M Elgin (Russia) A Kudryavtsev	7^{7}	7
2	(Italy) D Bracciali (Italy) P Starace	6^{4}	5

Semifinals
1	(Czech Republic) F Čermák (Slovakia) F Polášek	4	4
3	(United Kingdom) C Fleming (United Kingdom) R Hutchins	6	6
(Germany) M Kohlmann (Germany) A Waske	7^{7}	5	[9]
(Russia) M Elgin (Russia) A Kudryavtsev	6^{2}	7	[11]

Final
3	(United Kingdom) C Fleming (United Kingdom) R Hutchins	6	6^{5}	[10]
(Russia) M Elgin (Russia) A Kudryavtsev	3	7^{7}	[8]
