= Andrey Yakovlev =

Andrey Yakovlev may refer to:

- Andrei Yakovlev (born 1995), Russian footballer
- Andrey Yakovlev (tennis) (born 1992), Russian tennis player
