= Saar Steele =

Israeli tennis player

- Native name: סער סטיל
- Country (sports): Israel
- Born: 28 September 1984 (age 40); Tel Aviv, Israel
- Plays: Right-handed
- Prize money: $20,092

Singles
- Career record: 0–0 (at ATP Tour level, Grand Slam level, and in Davis Cup)
- Career titles: 0 ITF
- Highest ranking: No. 1005 (28 May 2012)

Doubles
- Career record: 0–1 (at ATP Tour level, Grand Slam level, and in Davis Cup)
- Career titles: 3 ITF
- Highest ranking: No. 580 (1 February 2010)
- Last updated on: 2 October 2018.

Saar Steele (Hebrew: סער סטיל; born 28 September 1984) is an Israeli tennis player.

Steele has a career high ATP singles ranking of 1005 achieved on 28 May 2012. He also has a career high ATP doubles ranking of 580 achieved on 1 February 2010.

Steele made his ATP main draw debut at the 2011 St. Petersburg Open in the doubles draw partnering Dudi Sela.
