= 2010 St. Petersburg Open – Singles =

Singles
- 2010 St. Petersburg Open

Final
- Champion: (Kazakhstan) Mikhail Kukushkin
- Runner-up: (Russia) Mikhail Youzhny
- Score: 6–3, 7–6^{(7–2)}

Events
Singles	Doubles
← 2009 ·	St. Petersburg Open	· 2011 →

Sergiy Stakhovsky was the defending champion, but lost in the first round to Benjamin Becker. Mikhail Kukushkin defeated 1st seed Mikhail Youzhny 6–3, 7–6^{(7–2)} to win this tournament.

== Seeds ==
1. (Russia) Mikhail Youzhny (final)
2. (Ukraine) Sergiy Stakhovsky (first round)
3. (Serbia) Janko Tipsarević (quarterfinals)
4. (Chinese Taipei) Lu Yen-hsun (second round)
5. (Serbia) Viktor Troicki (first round)
6. (Uzbekistan) Denis Istomin (first round, retired because of a right knee injury)
7. (France) Jérémy Chardy (first round)
8. (Romania) Victor Hănescu (quarterfinals)

== Draw ==
=== Key ===
- Q = Qualifier
- WC = Wild card
- LL = Lucky loser
- Alt = Alternate
- ITF = ITF entry
- PR = Protected ranking
- SR = Special ranking
- SE = Special exempt
- JE = Junior exempt
- JR = Junior Accelerator Programme entrant
- CO = College Accelerator Programme entrant
- NG = Next Gen Accelerator Program entrant
- w/o = Walkover
- r = Retired
- d = Defaulted

=== Finals ===
Semifinals
1	(Russia) Mikhail Youzhny	7	4	7^{10}
WC	(Russia) Dmitry Tursunov	5	6	6^{8}
(Kazakhstan) Mikhail Kukushkin	6	6
(Ukraine) Illya Marchenko	3	4

Final
1	(Russia) Mikhail Youzhny	3	6^{2}
(Kazakhstan) Mikhail Kukushkin	6	7^{7}

=== Top half ===
First round
1	(Russia) M Youzhny	6	6
(Germany) D Brands	4	1
WC	(Russia) A Kuznetsov	5	6^{2}
Q	(Russia) E Donskoy	7	7^{7}
Q	(United States) R Ram	6	6^{5}	6
(Spain) P Andújar	3	7^{7}	3
(Argentina) H Zeballos	2	0
8	(Romania) V Hănescu	6	6
4	(Chinese Taipei) Y-h Lu	6	6
(Italy) P Starace	2	2
WC	(Russia) D Tursunov	3	6	6
(Poland) M Przysiężny	6	3	2
(Ukraine) A Dolgopolov	7^{7}	6
(Italy) F Fognini	6^{5}	4
(Germany) R Schüttler	6	4	6
5	(Serbia) V Troicki	3	6	3

Second round
1	(Russia) M Youzhny	3	6	6
Q	(Russia) E Donskoy	6	3	2
Q	(United States) R Ram	6^{1}	6	3
8	(Romania) V Hănescu	7^{7}	3	6
4	(Chinese Taipei) Y-h Lu	1	4
WC	(Russia) D Tursunov	6	6
(Ukraine) A Dolgopolov	6	6
(Germany) R Schüttler	4	2

Quarterfinals
1	(Russia) M Youzhny	6^{5}	6	7^{8}
8	(Romania) V Hănescu	7^{7}	3	6^{6}
WC	(Russia) D Tursunov	6	6
(Ukraine) A Dolgopolov	4	2

Semifinals
1	(Russia) M Youzhny	7	4	7^{10}
WC	(Russia) D Tursunov	5	6	6^{8}

=== Bottom half ===
First round
7	(France) J Chardy	7^{7}	1	0
(Kazakhstan) M Kukushkin	6^{3}	6	6
(Italy) F Volandri	6	3	2
(Russia) T Gabashvili	3	6	6
WC	(Russia) I Andreev	1	5
(United States) M Russell	6	7
(Russia) I Kunitsyn	4	2
3	(Serbia) J Tipsarević	6	6
6	(Uzbekistan) D Istomin	2	2^{r}
(Ukraine) I Marchenko	6	2
Q	(Russia) K Kravchuk	6	6
Q	(Czech Republic) F Čermák	2	3
(Argentina) M González	4	3
(France) P-H Mathieu	6	6
(Germany) B Becker	6	5	6
2	(Ukraine) S Stakhovsky	4	7	4

Second round
(Kazakhstan) M Kukushkin	6	6
(Russia) T Gabashvili	3	4
(United States) M Russell	2	5
3	(Serbia) J Tipsarević	6	7
(Ukraine) I Marchenko	6	6
Q	(Russia) K Kravchuk	4	4
(France) P-H Mathieu	4	2
(Germany) B Becker	6	6

Quarterfinals
(Kazakhstan) M Kukushkin	7	3	6
3	(Serbia) J Tipsarević	5	6	4
(Ukraine) I Marchenko	6	2	6
(Germany) B Becker	4	6	2

Semifinals
(Kazakhstan) M Kukushkin	6	6
(Ukraine) I Marchenko	3	4
