= 2015 St. Petersburg Open – Doubles =

Doubles
- 2015 St. Petersburg Open

Final
- Champions: (Philippines) Treat Huey (Finland) Henri Kontinen
- Runners-up: (Austria) Julian Knowle (Austria) Alexander Peya
- Score: 7–5, 6–3

Events
Singles	Doubles
← 2014 ·	St. Petersburg Open	· 2016 →

David Marrero and Fernando Verdasco won the last edition of the tournament held in 2013, but chose not to participate this year.
Treat Huey and Henri Kontinen won the title, defeating Julian Knowle and Alexander Peya in the final, 7–5, 6–3.

== Seeds ==
1. (Philippines) Treat Huey / (Finland) Henri Kontinen (champions)
2. (Austria) Julian Knowle / (Austria) Alexander Peya (final)
3. (Poland) Mariusz Fyrstenberg / (Mexico) Santiago González (quarterfinals, withdrew)
4. (Austria) Philipp Oswald / (Canada) Adil Shamasdin (quarterfinals)

== Draw ==
=== Key ===
- Q = Qualifier
- WC = Wild card
- LL = Lucky loser
- Alt = Alternate
- SE = Special exempt
- PR = Protected ranking
- ITF = ITF entry
- JE = Junior exempt
- w/o = Walkover
- r = Retired
- d = Defaulted
- SR = Special ranking

=== Draw ===
First round
1	(Philippines) T Huey (Finland) H Kontinen	7^{7}	7^{7}
(Czech Republic) F Čermák (Kazakhstan) M Kukushkin	6^{2}	6^{2}
(Israel) J Erlich (United Kingdom) C Fleming	6	5	[8]
(Australia) R Junaid (United States) N Monroe	4	7	[10]
4	(Austria) P Oswald (Canada) A Shamasdin	7^{8}	2	[10]
(Belarus) S Betov (Russia) M Elgin	6^{6}	6	[5]
(Belarus) A Bury (Uzbekistan) D Istomin	4	7^{7}	[10]
(Austria) A Haider-Maurer (Slovakia) I Zelenay	6	6^{2}	[8]
WC	(Russia) E Donskoy (Russia) K Kravchuk	3	6	[5]
WC	(Russia) A Rublev (Russia) M Youzhny	6	2	[10]
(Spain) D Gimeno-Traver (Spain) M Granollers	3	6	[7]
3	(Poland) M Fyrstenberg (Mexico) S González	6	3	[10]
(Lithuania) R Berankis (Russia) T Gabashvili	1	7	[10]
(Cyprus) M Baghdatis (Australia) T Kokkinakis	6	5	[4]
(Moldova) R Albot (France) B Paire	2	1
2	(Austria) J Knowle (Austria) A Peya	6	6

Quarterfinals
1	(Philippines) T Huey (Finland) H Kontinen	4	7^{7}	[10]
(Australia) R Junaid (United States) N Monroe	6	6^{4}	[5]
4	(Austria) P Oswald (Canada) A Shamasdin	6	3	[11]
(Belarus) A Bury (Uzbekistan) D Istomin	3	6	[13]
WC	(Russia) A Rublev (Russia) M Youzhny	w/o
3	(Poland) M Fyrstenberg (Mexico) S González
(Lithuania) R Berankis (Russia) T Gabashvili	6^{1}	6^{1}
2	(Austria) J Knowle (Austria) A Peya	7^{7}	7^{7}

Semifinals
1	(Philippines) T Huey (Finland) H Kontinen	6	7
(Belarus) A Bury (Uzbekistan) D Istomin	3	5
WC	(Russia) A Rublev (Russia) M Youzhny	4	2
2	(Austria) J Knowle (Austria) A Peya	6	6

Final
1	(Philippines) T Huey (Finland) H Kontinen	7	6
2	(Austria) J Knowle (Austria) A Peya	5	3
