= 2011 St. Petersburg Open – Singles =

Singles
- 2011 St. Petersburg Open

Final
- Champion: (Croatia) Marin Čilić
- Runner-up: (Serbia) Janko Tipsarević
- Score: 6–3, 3–6, 6–2

Events
Singles	Doubles
← 2010 ·	St. Petersburg Open	· 2012 →

Mikhail Kukushkin was the defending champion but lost to Michael Berrer in the first round.

Marin Čilić won the tournament beating Janko Tipsarević in the final, 6–3, 3–6, 6–2.

== Seeds ==
1. (France) Gilles Simon (first round)
2. (Serbia) Janko Tipsarević (final)
3. (Ukraine) Alexandr Dolgopolov (first round)
4. (Croatia) Marin Čilić (champion)
5. (Russia) Mikhail Youzhny (semifinals)
6. (Spain) Marcel Granollers (first round)
7. (United States) Alex Bogomolov Jr. (semifinals)
8. (Russia) Dmitry Tursunov (second round)

== Draw ==
=== Key ===
- Q = Qualifier
- WC = Wild card
- LL = Lucky loser
- Alt = Alternate
- SE = Special exempt
- PR = Protected ranking
- ITF = ITF entry
- JE = Junior exempt
- w/o = Walkover
- r = Retired
- d = Defaulted
- SR = Special ranking

=== Finals ===
Semifinals
5	(Russia) Mikhail Youzhny	3	4
4	(Croatia) Marin Čilić	6	6
7	(United States) Alex Bogomolov Jr.	2	1
2	(Serbia) Janko Tipsarević	6	6

Final
4	(Croatia) Marin Čilić	6	3	6
2	(Serbia) Janko Tipsarević	3	6	2

=== Top half ===
First round
1	(France) G Simon	6	4	4
(France) A Mannarino	2	6	6
WC	(Latvia) E Gulbis	3	4
(Czech Republic) L Rosol	6	6
(Spain) P Riba	2	1
(France) J Benneteau	6	6
(Ukraine) S Stakhovsky	3	6^{7}
5	(Russia) M Youzhny	6	7^{9}
4	(Croatia) M Čilić	6	7^{7}
Q	(Ukraine) S Bubka	4	6^{1}
(India) S Devvarman	6	6
(Slovakia) K Beck	2	3
Q	(Canada) V Pospisil	5	6^{4}
(Italy) A Seppi	7	7^{7}
(Russia) I Andreev	3	6	7^{7}
6	(Spain) M Granollers	6	4	6^{4}

Second round
(France) A Mannarino	6	7^{7}
(Czech Republic) L Rosol	2	6^{5}
(France) J Benneteau	4	6	2
5	(Russia) M Youzhny	6	3	6
4	(Croatia) M Čilić	5	6	6
(India) S Devvarman	7	1	3
(Italy) A Seppi	3	6	6
(Russia) I Andreev	6	2	4

Quarterfinals
(France) A Mannarino	2	3
5	(Russia) M Youzhny	6	6
4	(Croatia) M Čilić	4	7^{10}	6
(Italy) A Seppi	6	6^{8}	4

Semifinals
5	(Russia) M Youzhny	3	4
4	(Croatia) M Čilić	6	6

=== Bottom half ===
First round
7	(United States) A Bogomolov Jr.	6	6
(Russia) I Kunitsyn	3	1
(Argentina) C Berlocq	7	3	1
(Germany) P Kohlschreiber	6^{4}	6	6
SE	(France) J Chardy	4	4
Q	(Serbia) D Lajović	6	6
WC	(Israel) D Sela	6	6
3	(Ukraine) A Dolgopolov	2	2
8	(Russia) D Tursunov	7	6
Q	(Russia) T Gabashvili	5	3
(Italy) P Starace	6	6
WC	(Russia) I Nedelko	0	1
(Kazakhstan) M Kukushkin	1	6	4
(Germany) M Berrer	6	4	6
(Belgium) O Rochus	2	5
2	(Serbia) J Tipsarević	6	7

Second round
7	(United States) A Bogomolov Jr.	6	3	7
(Germany) P Kohlschreiber	4	6	5
Q	(Serbia) D Lajović	2	6	6
WC	(Israel) D Sela	6	2	1
8	(Russia) D Tursunov	2	4
(Italy) P Starace	6	6
(Germany) M Berrer	3	0^{r}
2	(Serbia) J Tipsarević	6	2

Quarterfinals
7	(United States) A Bogomolov Jr.	6	6
Q	(Serbia) D Lajović	2	1
(Italy) P Starace	7^{8}	2	1
2	(Serbia) J Tipsarević	6^{6}	6	6

Semifinals
7	(United States) A Bogomolov Jr.	2	1
2	(Serbia) J Tipsarević	6	6
