= 2015 St. Petersburg Open =

- Date: 21–27 September
- Edition: 20th
- Category: ATP World Tour 250 Series
- Surface: Hard
- Location: St. Petersburg, Russia
- Venue: Sibur Arena

Champions

Singles
- (Canada) Milos Raonic

Doubles
- (Philippines) Treat Huey / (Finland) Henri Kontinen
- St. Petersburg Open

The 2015 St. Petersburg Open was a tennis tournament played on indoor hard courts. It was the 20th edition of the St. Petersburg Open, and part of the ATP World Tour 250 Series of the 2015 ATP World Tour. It took place at the Sibur Arena in Saint Petersburg, Russia, from September 21 through 27, 2015.

== Singles main-draw entrants ==
=== Seeds ===
| Country | Player | Rank^{1} | Seed |
|---|---|---|---|
| CZE | Tomáš Berdych | 5 | 1 |
| CAN | Milos Raonic | 9 | 2 |
| AUT | Dominic Thiem | 20 | 3 |
| ESP | Roberto Bautista Agut | 22 | 4 |
| ESP | Tommy Robredo | 27 | 5 |
| FRA | Benoît Paire | 32 | 6 |
| POR | João Sousa | 48 | 7 |
| KAZ | Mikhail Kukushkin | 49 | 8 |

- ^{1} Rankings are as of September 14, 2015

=== Other entrants ===
The following players received wildcards into the singles main draw:

- (Russia) Evgeny Donskoy
- (Russia) Andrey Rublev
- (Russia) Mikhail Youzhny

The following players received entry from the qualifying draw:

- (Moldova) Radu Albot
- (Kazakhstan) Andrey Golubev
- (Belarus) Yaraslav Shyla
- (France) Alexandre Sidorenko

=== Withdrawals ===
Before the tournament

- (Spain) Pablo Andújar →replaced by Ernests Gulbis

== Doubles main-draw entrants ==
=== Seeds ===
| Country | Player | Country | Player | Rank^{1} | Seed |
|---|---|---|---|---|---|
| PHI | Treat Huey | FIN | Henri Kontinen | 76 | 1 |
| AUT | Julian Knowle | AUT | Alexander Peya | 76 | 2 |
| POL | Mariusz Fyrstenberg | MEX | Santiago González | 108 | 3 |
| AUT | Philipp Oswald | CAN | Adil Shamasdin | 118 | 4 |

- Rankings are as of September 14, 2015

=== Other entrants ===
The following pairs received wildcards into the doubles main draw:

- (Russia) Evgeny Donskoy / (Russia) Konstantin Kravchuk
- (Russia) Andrey Rublev / (Russia) Mikhail Youzhny

== Finals ==
=== Singles ===
- (Canada) Milos Raonic defeated (Portugal) João Sousa, 6–3, 3–6, 6–3

=== Doubles ===
- (Philippines) Treat Huey / (Finland) Henri Kontinen defeated (Austria) Julian Knowle / (Austria) Alexander Peya, 7–5, 6–3
