= 2010 St. Petersburg Open =

- Date: 25–31 October
- Edition: 16th
- Category: ATP World Tour 250 Series
- Draw: 32Q / 32S / 16D
- Prize money: $663,750
- Surface: Hard / indoor
- Location: St. Petersburg, Russia
- Venue: Petersburg Sports and Concert Complex

Champions

Singles
- (Kazakhstan) Mikhail Kukushkin

Doubles
- (Italy) Daniele Bracciali / (Italy) Potito Starace
| ← 2009 · | St. Petersburg Open | · 2011 → |

The 2010 St. Petersburg Open was a tennis tournament played on indoor hard courts. It was the 16th edition of the St. Petersburg Open, and part of the ATP World Tour 250 Series of the 2010 ATP World Tour. It was held at the Petersburg Sports and Concert Complex in Saint Petersburg, Russia, from October 25 through October 31, 2010.

== ATP entrants ==
=== Seeds ===
| Country | Player | Rank* | Seed |
|---|---|---|---|
| RUS | Mikhail Youzhny | 9 | 1 |
| UKR | Sergiy Stakhovsky | 35 | 2 |
| SRB | Janko Tipsarević | 38 | 3 |
| TPE | Lu Yen-hsun | 39 | 4 |
| SRB | Viktor Troicki | 43 | 5 |
| UZB | Denis Istomin | 46 | 6 |
| FRA | Jérémy Chardy | 49 | 7 |
| ROM | Victor Hănescu | 51 | 8 |

* Seeds are based on the rankings of October 18, 2010.

=== Other entrants ===
The following players received wildcards into the singles main draw:

- (Russia) Igor Andreev
- (Russia) Andrey Kuznetsov
- (Russia) Dmitry Tursunov

The following players received entry from the qualifying draw:

- (Czech Republic) František Čermák
- (Russia) Evgeny Donskoy
- (Russia) Konstantin Kravchuk
- (United States) Rajeev Ram

== Finals ==
=== Singles ===
(Kazakhstan) Mikhail Kukushkin defeated (Russia) Mikhail Youzhny, 6–3, 7–6^{(7–2)}

- It was Kukushkin's first career title.

=== Doubles ===
(Italy) Daniele Bracciali / (Italy) Potito Starace defeated (India) Rohan Bopanna / (Pakistan) Aisam-ul-Haq Qureshi, 7–6^{(8–6)}, 7–6^{(7–5)}
