= 2015 St. Petersburg Open – Singles =

Singles
- 2015 St. Petersburg Open

Final
- Champion: (Canada) Milos Raonic
- Runner-up: (Portugal) João Sousa
- Score: 6–3, 3–6, 6–3

Details
- Draw: 28
- Seeds: 8

Events
Singles	Doubles
- St. Petersburg Open

Ernests Gulbis won the last edition of the tournament held in 2013, but lost in the first round to Marcos Baghdatis.
Milos Raonic won the title, defeating João Sousa in the final, 6–3, 3–6, 6–3.

== Seeds ==
The top four seeds receive a bye into the second round.

1. (Czech Republic) Tomáš Berdych (second round)
2. (Canada) Milos Raonic (champion)
3. (Austria) Dominic Thiem (semifinals)
4. (Spain) Roberto Bautista Agut (semifinals)
5. (Spain) Tommy Robredo (quarterfinals)
6. (France) Benoît Paire (first round, retired)
7. (Portugal) João Sousa (final)
8. (Kazakhstan) Mikhail Kukushkin (first round)

== Draw ==
Key

- Q = Qualifier
- WC = Wild card
- LL = Lucky loser
- Alt = Alternate
- ITF = ITF entry
- PR = Protected ranking
- SR = Special ranking
- SE = Special exempt
- JE = Junior exempt
- JR = Junior Accelerator Programme entrant
- CO = College Accelerator Programme entrant
- NG = Next Gen Accelerator Program entrant
- w/o = Walkover
- r = Retired
- d = Defaulted

=== Finals ===
Semifinals
7	(Portugal) João Sousa	6	7^{7}
3	(Austria) Dominic Thiem	4	6^{5}
4	(Spain) Roberto Bautista Agut	2	6^{2}
2	(Canada) Milos Raonic	6	7^{7}

Final
7	(Portugal) João Sousa	3	6	3
2	(Canada) Milos Raonic	6	3	6

=== Top half ===
First round
WC	(Russia) A Rublev	6	3	1
(Italy) S Bolelli	4	6	6
(Spain) M Granollers	6	6
(Australia) T Kokkinakis	3	3
Q	(Moldova) R Albot	6	5	4
7	(Portugal) J Sousa	3	7	6
(Spain) D Gimeno Traver	5	6^{2}
(Austria) A Haider-Maurer	7	7^{7}
Q	(Kazakhstan) A Golubev	4	6	4
(Germany) B Becker	6	1	6
(Uzbekistan) D Istomin	7^{7}	2	6
8	(Kazakhstan) M Kukushkin	6^{4}	6	2

Second round
1	(Czech Republic) T Berdych	6^{5}	4
(Italy) S Bolelli	7^{7}	6
(Spain) M Granollers	3	3
7	(Portugal) J Sousa	6	6
3	(Austria) D Thiem	6	7^{7}
(Austria) A Haider-Maurer	2	6^{2}
(Germany) B Becker	6	6^{5}	4
(Uzbekistan) D Istomin	2	7^{7}	6

Quarterfinals
(Italy) S Bolelli	6^{7}	6^{1}
7	(Portugal) J Sousa	7^{9}	7^{7}
3	(Austria) D Thiem	6	7
(Uzbekistan) D Istomin	2	5

Semifinals
7	(Portugal) J Sousa	6	7^{7}
3	(Austria) D Thiem	4	6^{5}

=== Bottom half ===
First round
6	(France) B Paire	4	0^{r}
(Poland) J Janowicz	6	3
(Lithuania) R Berankis	6^{9}	6	6^{4}
(France) L Pouille	7^{11}	3	7^{7}
(Russia) T Gabashvili	6	6
Q	(Belarus) Y Shyla	2	2
5	(Spain) T Robredo	6	3	6
WC	(Russia) M Youzhny	4	6	3
(Cyprus) M Baghdatis	6	4	6
(Latvia) E Gulbis	4	6	3
Q	(France) A Sidorenko	2	4
WC	(Russia) E Donskoy	6	6

Second round
(Poland) J Janowicz	6^{8}	6^{1}
(France) L Pouille	7^{10}	7^{7}
(Russia) T Gabashvili	3	7	5
4	(Spain) R Bautista Agut	6	5	7
5	(Spain) T Robredo	7^{7}	6
(Cyprus) M Baghdatis	6^{5}	1
WC	(Russia) E Donskoy	4	4
2	(Canada) M Raonic	6	6

Quarterfinals
(France) L Pouille	2	3
4	(Spain) R Bautista Agut	6	6
5	(Spain) T Robredo	1	2
2	(Canada) M Raonic	6	6

Semifinals
4	(Spain) R Bautista Agut	2	6^{2}
2	(Canada) M Raonic	6	7^{7}

== Qualifying ==
=== Seeds ===
1. (Moldova) Radu Albot (qualified)
2. (Kazakhstan) Andrey Golubev (qualified)
3. (Russia) Alexander Kudryavtsev (qualifying competition)
4. (Belarus) Dzmitry Zhyrmont (first round)
5. (Croatia) Nikola Mektić (second round)
6. (Belarus) Yaraslav Shyla (qualified)
7. (Estonia) Vladimir Ivanov (second round)
8. (Russia) Alexey Vatutin (second round)

=== Qualifiers ===
1. (Moldova) Radu Albot
2. (Kazakhstan) Andrey Golubev
3. (France) Alexandre Sidorenko
4. (Belarus) Yaraslav Shyla

=== Qualifying draw ===
==== First qualifier ====
First round
1	(Moldova) Radu Albot	6	6^{2}	6
(Russia) Mikhail Ledovskikh	2	7^{7}	3
(Russia) Alexander Ovcharov	6^{4}	5
(Russia) Alexandr Igoshin	7^{7}	7
WC	(Russia) Artur Gusev	0	0
(Russia) Valery Rudnev	6	6
(Russia) Evgeny Karlovskiy	5	2
8	(Russia) Alexey Vatutin	7	6

Second round
1	(Moldova) Radu Albot	6	6
(Russia) Alexandr Igoshin	4	2
(Russia) Valery Rudnev	6	2	6
8	(Russia) Alexey Vatutin	2	6	4

Qualifying competition
1	(Moldova) Radu Albot	6	6
(Russia) Valery Rudnev	3	0

==== Second qualifier ====
First round
2	(Kazakhstan) Andrey Golubev	6	6
(Russia) Kirill Kivattsev	1	2
WC	(Russia) Pavel Shchaya-Zubrov	6	0	1
(Russia) Evgeny Elistratov	4	6	6
(Belarus) Yahor Yatsyk	6^{3}	6	2
(Russia) Evgenii Tiurnev	7^{7}	4	6
(Russia) Alexander Perfilov	3	3
5	(Croatia) Nikola Mektić	6	6

Second round
2	(Kazakhstan) Andrey Golubev	6	6
(Russia) Evgeny Elistratov	4	2
(Russia) Evgenii Tiurnev	6	7^{7}
5	(Croatia) Nikola Mektić	3	6^{5}

Qualifying competition
2	(Kazakhstan) Andrey Golubev	6	6
(Russia) Evgenii Tiurnev	4	2

==== Third qualifier ====
First round
3	(Russia) Alexander Kudryavtsev	6	6
(Ukraine) Volodymyr Uzhylovskyi	3	2
WC	(Russia) Philipp Klimov	1	4
(Russia) Alexander Vasilenko	6	6
(France) Alexandre Sidorenko	6	6
WC	(Mexico) Santiago González	3	1
(Belarus) Aleksei Khomich	1	1
7	(Estonia) Vladimir Ivanov	6	6

Second round
3	(Russia) Alexander Kudryavtsev	6	3	6
(Russia) Alexander Vasilenko	4	6	3
(France) Alexandre Sidorenko	3	6	6
7	(Estonia) Vladimir Ivanov	6	1	4

Qualifying competition
3	(Russia) Alexander Kudryavtsev	6	4	4
(France) Alexandre Sidorenko	3	6	6

==== Fourth qualifier ====
First round
4	(Belarus) Dzmitry Zhyrmont	6	3	2
(Russia) Vladimir Polyakov	1	6	6
(Russia) Mikhail Elgin	4	7	6^{3}
(Russia) Alexander Bublik	6	5	7^{7}
(Russia) Richard Muzaev	4	6	6
(Russia) Vitaly Kozyukov	6	2	1
PR	(Russia) Alexander Lobkov	6	1	2
6	(Belarus) Yaraslav Shyla	3	6	6

Second round
(Russia) Vladimir Polyakov	2	3
(Russia) Alexander Bublik	6	6
(Russia) Richard Muzaev	6	4	5
6	(Belarus) Yaraslav Shyla	4	6	7

Qualifying competition
(Russia) Alexander Bublik	3	4
6	(Belarus) Yaraslav Shyla	6	6
