= Nikolai Fidirko =

Belarusian tennis player

- Country (sports): Belarus
- Residence: Minsk, Belarus
- Born: 15 June 1987 (age 38) Olomouc, Czech Republic
- Height: 1.85 m (6 ft 1 in)
- Plays: Right-handed
- Prize money: $31,190

Singles
- Career record: 0–1 (at ATP Tour level, Grand Slam level, and in Davis Cup)
- Career titles: 0 ITF
- Highest ranking: No. 610 (25 October 2010)

Doubles
- Career record: 0–0 (at ATP Tour level, Grand Slam level, and in Davis Cup)
- Career titles: 6 ITF
- Highest ranking: No. 357 (30 August 2010)
- Last updated on: 20 February 2017.

Nikolai Andreyevich Fidirko (Belarusian: Мікалай Андрэевіч Фідзірка; Russian: Николай Андреевич Фидирко; born 15 June 1987) is a retired Belarusian tennis player.

Fidirko has a career-high ATP singles ranking of 610 achieved on 25 October 2010. He also has a career-high ATP doubles ranking of 357 achieved on 30 August 2010.

Fidirko made his ATP main draw debut at the 2012 St. Petersburg Open in singles facing Teymuraz Gabashvili.

He is the current coach of Aliaksandra Sasnovich
