= 2011 St. Petersburg Open =

- Date: 24–31 October
- Edition: 17th
- Category: ATP World Tour 250 Series
- Draw: 32S / 16D
- Prize money: $663,750
- Surface: Hard / indoor
- Location: St. Petersburg, Russia
- Venue: Petersburg Sports and Concert Complex

Champions

Singles
- (Croatia) Marin Čilić

Doubles
- (United Kingdom) Colin Fleming / (United Kingdom) Ross Hutchins
| ← 2010 · | St. Petersburg Open | · 2012 → |

The 2011 St. Petersburg Open was a tennis tournament played on indoor hard courts. It was the 17th edition of the St. Petersburg Open, and part of the ATP World Tour 250 Series of the 2011 ATP World Tour. It took place at the Petersburg Sports and Concert Complex in Saint Petersburg, Russia, from October 24 through October 30, 2011.

== ATP entrants ==
=== Seeds ===
| Country | Player | Rank* | Seed |
|---|---|---|---|
| FRA | Gilles Simon | 12 | 1 |
| SRB | Janko Tipsarević | 14 | 2 |
| UKR | Alexandr Dolgopolov | 17 | 3 |
| CRO | Marin Čilić | 22 | 4 |
| RUS | Mikhail Youzhny | 34 | 5 |
| ESP | Marcel Granollers | 35 | 6 |
| USA | Alex Bogomolov Jr. | 37 | 7 |
| RUS | Dmitry Tursunov | 40 | 8 |

* Seeds are based on the rankings of October 17, 2011.

=== Other entrants ===
The following players received wildcards into the singles main draw:

- (Latvia) Ernests Gulbis
- (Russia) Ivan Nedelko
- (Israel) Dudi Sela

The following players received entry a special exempt into the singles main draw:

- (France) Jérémy Chardy

The following players received entry from the qualifying draw:

- (Ukraine) Sergei Bubka
- (Russia) Teymuraz Gabashvili
- (Serbia) Dušan Lajović
- (Canada) Vasek Pospisil

== Finals ==
=== Singles ===
(Croatia) Marin Čilić defeated (Serbia) Janko Tipsarević 6–3, 3–6, 6–2

- It was Čilić's 1st title of the year and 6th of his career.

=== Doubles ===
(United Kingdom) Colin Fleming / (United Kingdom) Ross Hutchins defeated (Russia) Michail Elgin / (Russia) Alexandre Kudryavtsev 6–3, 6–7^{(5–7)}, [10–8]
