= Dmitri Marfinsky =

Russian tennis player

- Country (sports): Russia
- Born: 26 August 1989 (age 37)
- Prize money: $10,022

Singles
- Career record: 0–0 (at ATP Tour level, Grand Slam level, and in Davis Cup)
- Career titles: 0
- Highest ranking: No. 1223 (11 October 2010)

Doubles
- Career record: 0–1 (at ATP Tour level, Grand Slam level, and in Davis Cup)
- Career titles: 0
- Highest ranking: No. 989 (10 June 2013)
- Last updated on: 8 March 2021.

Dmitri Dmitrievich Marfinsky (Russian: Дмитрий Дмитриевич Марфинский; born 26 August 1989) is a former Russian tennis player.

Marfinsky has a career high ATP singles ranking of 1223 achieved on 11 October 2010. He also has a career high ATP doubles ranking of 989 achieved on 10 June 2013.

Marfinsky made his ATP main draw debut at the 2013 St. Petersburg Open in the doubles draw partnering Sergey Strelkov after the pair received entry into the main draw as alternates.
