= Sergey Strelkov =

Russian tennis player

- Country (sports): Russia
- Born: 4 January 1991 (age 34)
- Prize money: $13,420

Singles
- Career record: 0–0 (at ATP Tour level, Grand Slam level, and in Davis Cup)
- Career titles: 0
- Highest ranking: No. 892 (16 September 2013)

Doubles
- Career record: 0–1 (at ATP Tour level, Grand Slam level, and in Davis Cup)
- Career titles: 1 ITF
- Highest ranking: No. 669 (30 August 2010)
- Last updated on: 8 March 2021.

Sergey Strelkov (born 4 January 1991) is a former Russian tennis player.

Strelkov has a career high ATP singles ranking of 892 achieved on 16 September 2013. He also has a career high ATP doubles ranking of 669 achieved on 30 August 2010.

Strelkov made his ATP main draw debut at the 2013 St. Petersburg Open in the doubles draw partnering Dmitri Marfinsky after the pair received entry into the main draw as alternates.
