= Andrei Iakovlev =

Russian tennis player

- Country (sports): Russia
- Born: 18 August 1992 (age 33) Saint Petersburg, Russia
- Height: 1.75 m (5 ft 9 in)
- Plays: Right-handed (two-handed backhand)
- Prize money: $3,747

Singles
- Career record: 0–0 (at ATP Tour level, Grand Slam level, and in Davis Cup)
- Career titles: 0
- Highest ranking: No. 1415 (20 September 2010)
- Current ranking: No. 1835 (19 June 2017)

Doubles
- Career record: 0–2 (at ATP Tour level, Grand Slam level, and in Davis Cup)
- Career titles: 0
- Last updated on: 19 June 2017.

Andrei Iakovlev (born 18 August 1992) is a Russian tennis player.

Iakovlev has a career high ATP singles ranking of 1415 achieved on 20 September 2010.

Iakovlev made his ATP main draw debut at the 2010 St. Petersburg Open in the doubles draw partnering Alexander Zhurbin.
